= 2007 Houston Astros season =

46th season in Major League Baseball for the Houston Astros

2007 Houston Astros
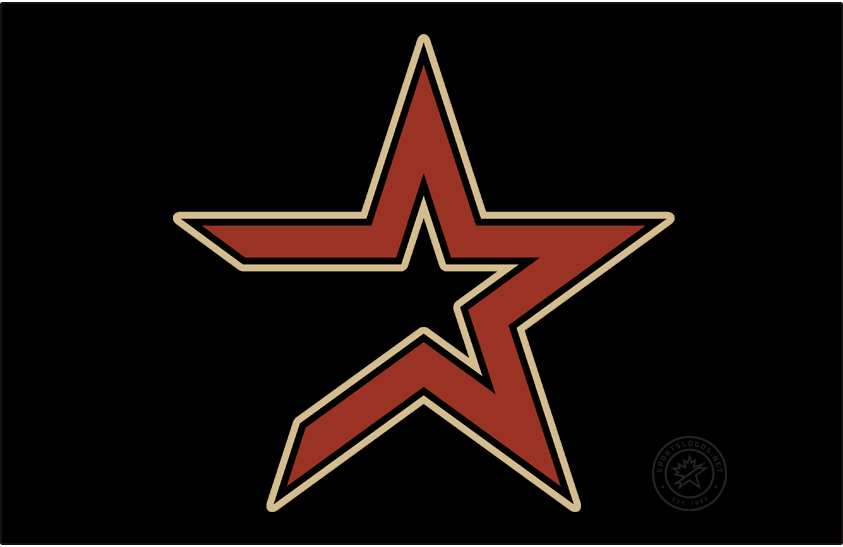
- League: National League
- Division: Central
- Ballpark: Minute Maid Park
- City: Houston, Texas
- Record: 73–89 (.451)
- Divisional place: 4th
- Owners: Drayton McLane, Jr.
- General managers: Tim Purpura (Note: Fired on August 27, 2007.); Tal Smith (Note: Interim); Ed Wade (Note: Hired September 20.)
- Managers: Phil Garner: 58–73 (.443); Cecil Cooper: 15–16 (.484)
- Television: FSN Houston; KNWS-TV (Ch. 51); Bill Brown, Jim Deshaies
- Radio: KTRH; Milo Hamilton, Brett Dolan, Dave Raymond; KLAT (Spanish)
- Stats: ESPN.com; Baseball Reference

The 2007 Houston Astros season was the 46th season for the Major League Baseball (MLB) franchise located in Houston, Texas, their 43rd as the Astros, 46th in the National League (NL), 15th in the NL Central division, and eighth at Minute Maid Park, the Astros entered the season as having finished in second place in the NL Central division with an 82–80 record and 1 1/2 games behind first place, a sixth consecutive winning season.

Houston began their season on April 2 while pitcher Roy Oswalt made his fifth consecutive Opening Day start. (Note: Oswalt joined J. R. Richard, Mike Scott, and Shane Reynolds with five Opening Day starts each for most in franchise history, which were all consecutively for each pitcher.) They hosted the Pittsburgh Pirates and were defeated, 4–2, in extra innings. The Astros' top selection in the June amateur draft was infielder Derek Dietrich, during the third round.

With a 5-for-5 performance on June 28, second baseman Craig Biggio achieved his 3,000th career hit. He became the 27th player in major league history to reach the milestone, the ninth major leaguer to assemble all 3,000 with the same team, and first Astro. Five days later, Biggio doubled to become the 25th major leaguer to attain 1,000 extra-base hits.

Outfielder Carlos Lee (third career selection) and Oswalt (second) represented the Astros at the MLB All-Star Game. On August 26, the club officially retired the jersey number 5 of the one Astros' core members of the Killer B's along with Biggio, former first baseman Jeff Bagwell.

The Astros dismissed manager Phil Garner and general manager Tim Purpura on August 27, 2007. Cecil Cooper was chosen to replace Garner on an interim basis, while Ed Wade replaced Purpura on September 20. On September 30, Biggio made his final major league appearance as a player, having announced his retirement on July 24. Houston drew 3,020,405 in attendance, signifying consecutive seasons to entertain at least 3 million fans for the first time in club history.

The Astros concluded the season with a 73–89 record, in fourth place and 12 games behind the division-champion Chicago Cubs. It was the first time since 2000 that Astros had both finished with a losing record, and out of either first or second place in their division. The 2000 and 2007 campaigns had also been the only two since 1993 that Houston had failed to achieve a winning record.

Following the season, Biggio was recognized with the Roberto Clemente and Heart & Hustle Awards, Lee earned his second career Silver Slugger Award, and outfielder Hunter Pence was selected to the Topps All-Star Rookie Team. Former Colt 45/Astro and Hall of Famer Joe Morgan was named to the All-time Gold Glove Team at second base.

== Offseason ==
=== Summary ===
The Houston Astros finalized the 2006 campaign with an 82–80 (.506) record, runners-up in the NL Centrial, and trailing the St. Louis Cardinals—that year's World Series champion—by 1 1/2 games. The Astros also trailed the Los Angeles Dodgers by six games for the Wild Card title. Houston missed the playoffs for the first time since 2003; however, it was their sixth consecutive season with both a winning record and a positional finish of first or second place, with each of the previous five seasons concluded in the latter ranking in the NL Central. Since 1994, the only campaign in which the Astros had not finished with a winning record and a first- or second-place standing in the NL Central was 2000. The Astros drew 3,022,763 in home attendance, the fourth campaign in club history to entertain at least 3 million fans, and first time since 2004. Lance Berkman tied or set National League records for switch hitters: hitting 45 home runs (tying Chipper Jones in 1999) and 136 runs batted in (RBI) Right-hander Roy Oswalt became the sixth Astros pitcher to lead the league for the earned run average title (2.98 ERA). Catcher Brad Ausmus was recognized with his third Gold Glove Award, while second baseman Craig Biggio won his first Heart & Hustle Award.

The Astros declined their team option for the 2007 season valued at $18 million for first baseman Jeff Bagwell on October 31, 2006, who, due to an arthritic shoulder condition, had last appeared in game action during the 2005 World Series. Instead, the option was bought out for $7 million. On December 15, 2006, Bagwell officially announced his retirement. The team announced they would conduct a pre-game ceremony on August 26, 2007, to officially retire his jersey number 5.

Pitchers Andy Pettitte and Roger Clemens both filed for free agency on November 6 and re-joined the New York Yankees. To make up for losing those key players, they signed pitcher Woody Williams, and traded with the Colorado Rockise for Jason Jennings and Miguel Asencio.

=== Transactions ===
- November 24, 2006: Signed free agent outfielder Carlos Lee to six-year, $100 million contract. Signing Lee was the largest offseason move the Astros made, and the $100 million contract award was the most in franchise history.
- January 3, 2007: Signed infielder Mark Loretta would sign a contract worth $2.5 million.
- January 12: Signed outfielder Richard Hidalgo to a Minor League Baseball contract.
- March 6: Signed second baseman Jose Altuve as an amateur free agent.
- March 24: Released outfielder Richard Hidalgo.

== Regular season ==
=== Summary ===
One of the most anticipated events for the Houston Astros during the 2007 season was the inevitable 3,000th hit of Craig Biggio's career. Biggio concluded the 2006 campaign with 2,930 total hits. In his 20th season, he had played longer for the club than anyone and accumulated numerous team records.

Broadcaster René Cárdenas returned to the Astros' Spanish broadcast lineup in 2007. Making his second stint with the team, Cárdenas was the first Spanish radio broadcaster for the expansion Houston Colt .45s in 1962 and remained with Houston for 14 seasons through 1975.

==== April ====
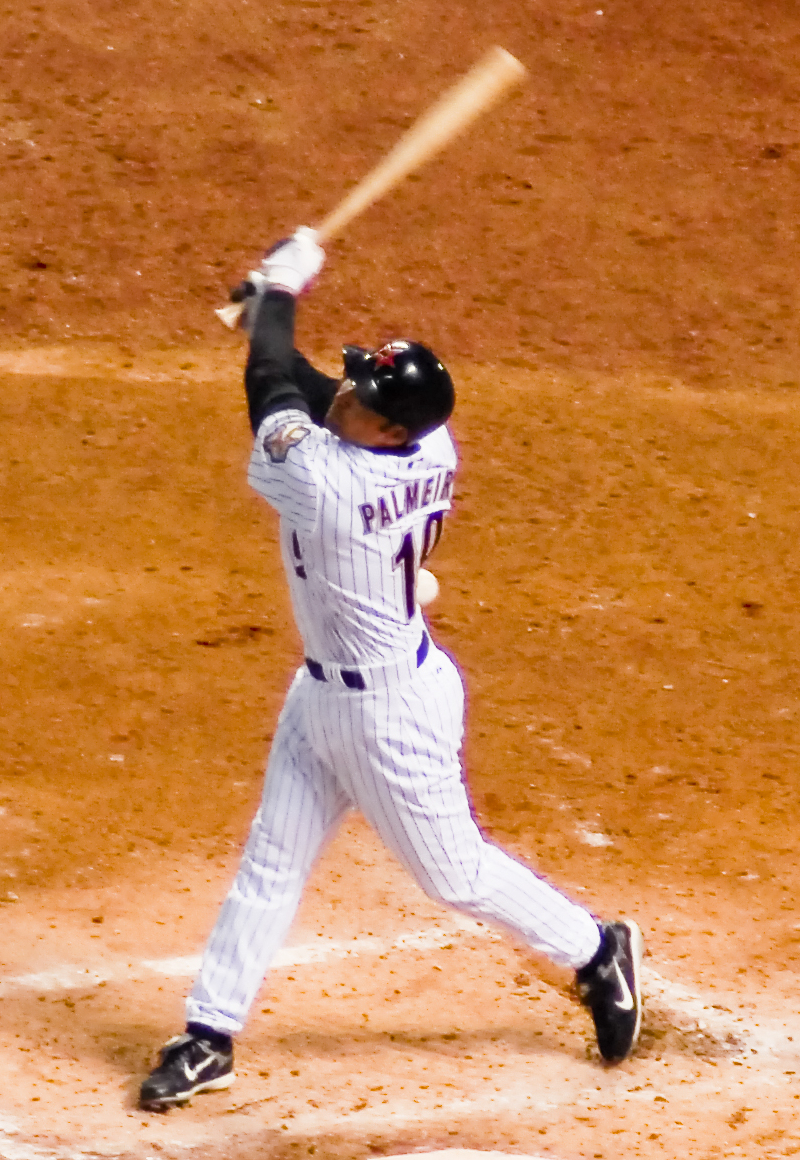
Astros' outfielder Orlando Palmeiro, Opening Day, 2007

Opening Day starting lineup
| Uniform | Player | Position |
|---|---|---|
| 7 | Craig Biggio | Second baseman |
| 28 | Adam Everett | Shortstop |
| 17 | Lance Berkman | First baseman |
| 45 | Carlos Lee | Left fielder |
| 14 | Morgan Ensberg | Third baseman |
| 30 | Luke Scott | Right fielder |
| 2 | Chris Burke | Center fielder |
| 11 | Brad Ausmus | Catcher |
| 44 | Roy Oswalt | Pitcher |
Venue: Minute Maid Park • Final: Pittsburgh 4, Houston 2 Sources:

The Astros hosted the Pittsburgh Pirates for Opening Day, which took place on April 2. Astros starter Roy Oswalt and Pirates starter Zach Duke exchanged shutout ball for the first four innings. Oswalt went 7 2/3 innings, diffusing five hits and one base on balls with one run surrendered. During the bottom of the fifth, Luke Scott deposited a Duke offering for home run and open a 2–0 lead. Craig Biggio lined a single off Jonah Bayliss during the bottom of the eighth inning to obtain his first safety of the season, and he concluded the day 1-for-4. In the top of the ninth, Xavier Nady took Brad Lidge offering deep to left to tie the contest, 2–2. In the top of the tenth inning, Jason Bay homered off Chad Qualls as Pittsburgh took the lead, 4–2. Reliever Salomón Torres retired the Astros in order in the bottom of the tenth to seal the Pirates' victory and earn the save, while Qualls was the losing pitcher. Biggio extended his club-record 19th Opening Day starts, including a 14th at second base, also a club record. His first three were at catcher, while he also made two as the center fielder. Meanwhile, Oswalt, who made his fifth consecutive Opening Day start, tied J. R. Richard, Mike Scott, and Shane Reynolds for the club record among starting pitchers.

Shortstop Adam Everett connected for a go-ahead home run on April 9 in the eighth inning off Bob Howry of the Chicago Cubs and set up an eventual 5–3 Astros' win. The drive was the 34th of Everett's career, which set a franchise record for the position, surpassing Dickie Thon, who was the club's shortstop from 1981–1987. Biggio doubled twice, and Chris Burke, Morgan Ensberg, Carlos Lee and Luke Scott each also doubled. Lance Berkman drew a base on balls and clipped a sacrifice fly. Chad Qualls was charged a blown save off an unearned run in the bottom of the seventh, but Everett's deep drive helped convert that to a victory. Rick White followed with a scoreless eighth for the hold, and Dan Wheeler earned his first save with a perfect ninth.

Imitated April 9, Berkman generated a 28-game on-base scintilla that represented a season high for the club, spanning until May 10. Berkman attained 25 hits, 31 walks, one hit by pitch during this stretch, slashing .319 / .484 / .457 / .942, four home runs and 18 RBI. (Note: Longest streak of consecutive games, in 2007, playing for HOU, in the regular season, requiring times on base ≥ 1, sorted by most games matching criteria.)

Carlos Lee, in the outfield, hit two grand slams and won a Silver Slugger Award in 2007.

The Astros realized a number of milestones on April 13 versus the Philadelphia Phillies. New outfielder Carlos Lee made an early impact with Houston, connecting for the only three-home run game of his major league career. A prolific grand slam artist, he also hit his first in an Astros uniform, and 10th of his career. The drive came in the top of the third inning, putting Houston ahead, 5–3. Lee became the ninth Astros player to hit three home runs in a game, succeeding Morgan Ensberg on May 15, 2005. (Note: Lee's three home run game was the 12th overall in team history. Yordan Alvarez became the next Astro to accomplish this feat, on August 10, 2019, also connecting for grand slam.) Lee also collected six runs batted in (RBI), the fourth such output of his career, and was the most for Lee during his Astros tenure, leading a 9–6 Astros victory. Ensberg added a three-run blast in the fourth inning for his first of year to combine with Lee to induce all of Houston's damage. Craig Biggio roped his 641st double to take over eighth place from Honus Wagner on baseball's all-time list. The Astros collected eight hits and drew eight bases on balls. Though he surrendered six walks and all six runs, Roy Oswalt picked up his second win of the season, and the 100th of his career.

Biggio connected for his third career grand slam on April 20, and first since July 24, 1994. The drive was off Greg Aquino at Miller Park in top of the ninth inning to break a 2–2 tie with the Milwaukee Brewers. However, this just the start of what resulted in a wild ninth inning. During the bottom of the ninth, Brad Lidge surrendered a three-run bomb to Prince Fielder to cut Houston's lead to 6–5. After Johnny Estrada doubled, Trever Miller replaced Lidge, and issued an intentional base on balls to Corey Hart. Chad Qualls then entered and induced a ground out from Gabe Gross to end the contest and Astros victory. Rick White (1–0) tossed a scoreless seventh and eighth to pick up the victory and Qualls earned his first save.

Starting April 23, Biggio forged a 14-game on-base streak, representing a personal season-high, and tied for fifth on the club for the season. Biggio slashed .305 / .364 / .525 / .899, collected 18 hits and 6 walks. He swatted four doubles, three triples, one home run and 7 RBI.

Biggio logged his 2,950th career hit on April 24.

On April 28, the Astros purchased the contract of Hunter Pence, the organization's top prospect from Triple-A affiliate, and made his debut that night where he got his first career hit and run scored.

==== May ====
Hunter Pence hit a grand slam for his first career home run.

Hunter Pence connected for his first grand slam on May 5—also his first MLB home run—off a Dennis Dove offering, with the blast at Busch Stadium. Hit in the top of the eight inning, it scored Chris Burke, Orlando Palmeiro and Luke Scott. The Astros' lead swelled to 13–0 over the St. Louis Cardinals. In spite of ample offense, Pence's was Houston's lone home run. Houston went 8-for-17 with runners in scoring position. Luke Scott doubled twice (8), Carlos Lee (6), Brad Ausmus (6), and Mark Loretta (3) each doubled and Lee had three RBI. Matt Albers (1–1) tossed 7 1/3 innings for Houston, scattering three hits, to earn his first Major League victory. This was Loretta's second four-hit bout with Houston and 20th overall in his career.

On May 9, 40-year-old Houston native Woody Williams got his first win in his eighth appearance in an Astros uniform. He had carved out a 14-year career with three different clubs prior to signing with the Astros during the offseason. Williams assisted his own cause by blooping a single into right field for the game-winning run batted in (RBI) to decide a 3–2 score over the Cincinnati Reds.

In backing up Roy Oswalt on May 12, Craig Biggio smashed his 647th double to pass Carl Yastrzemski into seventh place all-time in major league history. Meanwhile, Houston cruised to a 10–4 victory over the Arizona Diamondbacks.

Carlos Lee walloped his first walk-off home run as a member of the Astros on May 15, and third of his career, going deep against Jonathan Sánchez and clinching the Astros' 6–5 win. (Note: Carlos Lee: 6 home runs in 1999-2012—walk-off) Hunter Pence went 7-for-7 to commence a series against the San Francisco Giants on May 15 and 16. Pence became the first Astro to attain a hit in seven consecutive at bats since Vinny Castilla in 2001, and one short of the team record set by Art Howe in 1980. The Astros claimed their first home series win againat San Francisco since 1999. For the just the third time in his career, on May 17, Biggio struck out four times in a game. It was his first golden sombrero since August 20, 1999.

For the week ended May 20, Hunter Pence batted .591 (13-for-22) / .625 on-base percentage (OBP) / 1.091 slugging percentage (SLG) / 1.716 on-base plus slugging (OPS), three doubles, two home runs, five RBI, and 24 total bases. Four of Pence's six contests featured multiple-hit efforts. Pence was recognized as National League (NL) Player of the Week.

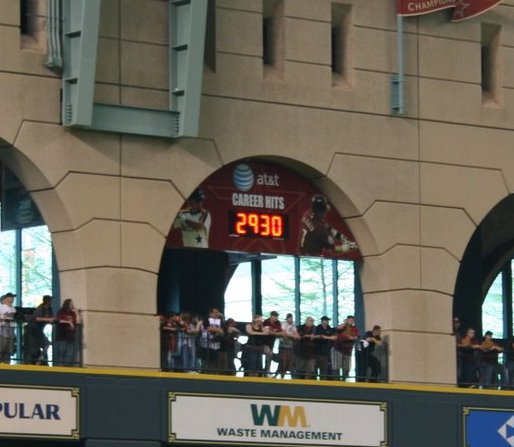
Craig Biggio's hit counter at Minute Maid Park

However, on May 26, just nine days following his third career four-strikeout game, Biggio attained his fourth career golden sombrero.

From May 20 to 30, 2007, the Astros endured one of their longest losing streaks since the 1995 campaign with 10 successive, including a 4–3 defeat to Cincinnati on May 30. The Astros were just one loss shy of tying their worst skid in franchise history, before snapping that streak the next day, also against the Reds.

Hunter Pence batted .343 / .372 OBP / .593 SLG, four home runs, 19 RBI, nine doubles, three triples, and 64 total bases over the month of May, his first full month in the major leagues. Thus, Pence received NL Rookie of the Month accolades, the third player in club history, and first since Kirk Saarloos in May 2002.

==== June ====
Commending June 6, Mark Loretta formulated an on-base streak of 18 contests, second-highest the club for the season to Berkman's 28 started April 9. Loretta slashed .305 / .364 / .525 / .899, accumulating 24 hits, 14 bases on balls and a hit by pitch. The streak lasted until June 24. Loretta swatted eight doubles and 11 RBI.

On June 12, the Astros defeated the Oakland Athletics for the first time in team history.

Second baseman Craig Biggio swiped an extra innings RBI double on June 24, which, at that point, raise the Astros' lead to 12–9 after having surrendered two separate leads. The 658th of his career, the double made Biggio the all-time leader among right-handed batters in major league history.

Having completing a 2–7 road trip, the Astros returned to Minute Maid Park to commence an 11-game homestand on June 28. The first team they would host was the Colorado Rockies. Though his batting average stood at .238 for the season, Biggio's career hit count was at 2,997.

==== Craig Biggio's 3,000th hit ====
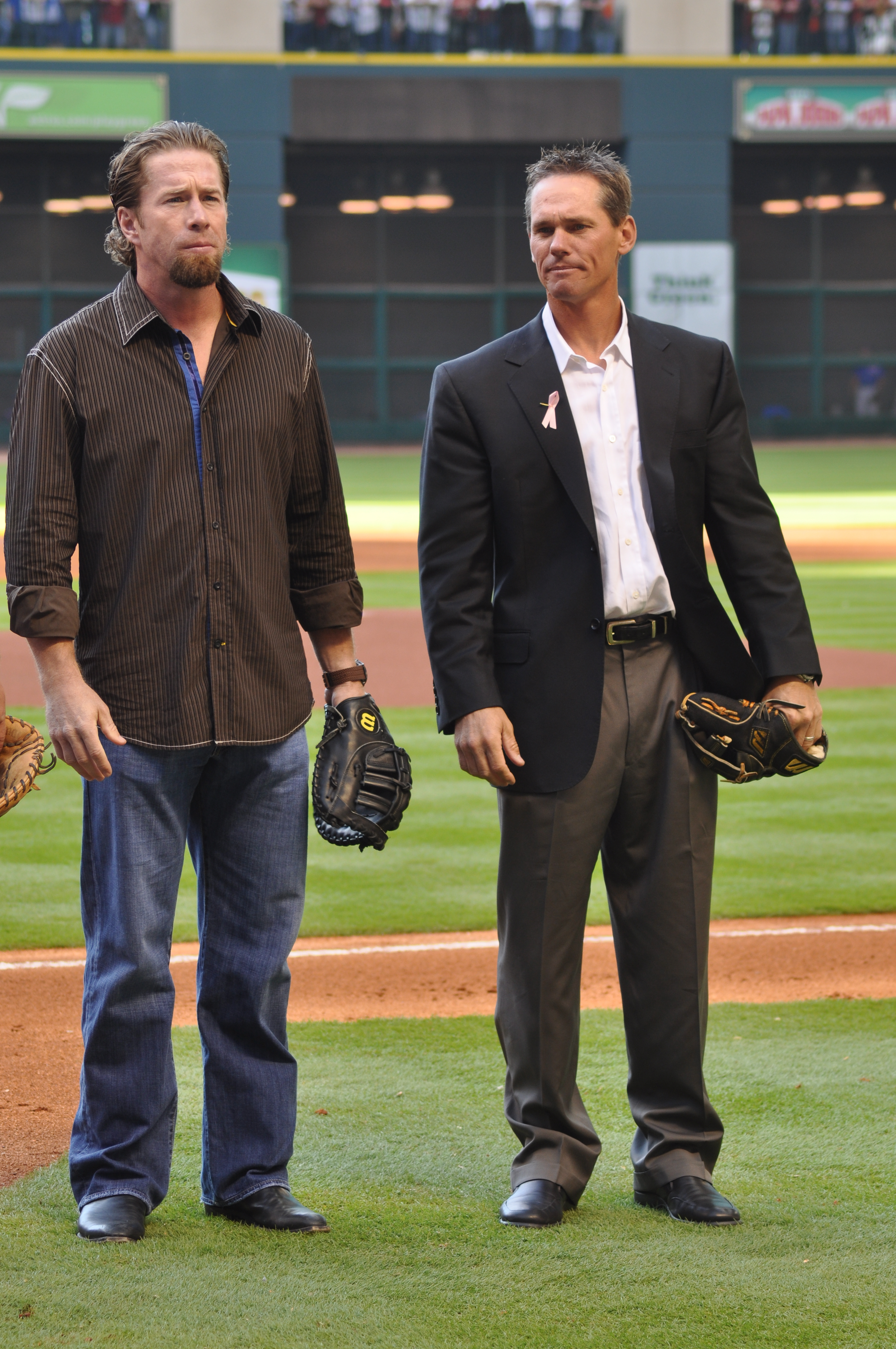
Jeff Bagwell (left) and Craig Biggio (right)

For the climax of a 5-for-5 performance on June 28 at Minute Maid Park, Biggio planted his 3,000th career hit during the seventh inning against the Rockies. Biggio became the 27th player in MLB history to do so, the ninth to accumulate all 3,000 with the same team, and first Houston Astro. (Note: The second of two five-hit during his career, Biggio's first occurred on Opening Day, 2001.) Number 3,000 was a single off Aaron Cooke that drove in Brad Ausmus for one of eight runs in an 8–5 Astros win. Additionally, Biggio became the eighth player in club history to accumulate multiple five-hit performances. (Note: Number of games in a career player meets criteria, playing for HOU, in the regular season, requiring hits ≥ 5, sorted by descending instances.)

In the seventh, Biggio drilled Cooke's 2–0 offering into right field to the right-center field gap. Having accumulated more than 600 doubles, Biggio kept going after the single, and was gunned down attempting to take second by his former teammate, Willy Taveras. However, Biggio did not leave the field for another five minutes as the 42,537 fans roared their approval while a banner exhibiting "Biggio" and "3,000" unfurled on the outfield wall. In succession, Biggio was mobbed by Astros teammates, and his wife, Patty, daughter, Quinn, and bat boy sons, Conor and Cavan, each converged with Biggio to a lengthy standing ovation.

Fellow "Killer B" Jeff Bagwell, who played first base for Houston alongside Biggio for 15 seasons, also emerged from the dugout to congratulate him. The Astros fans, who had momentarily quieted as play was about to resume, swelled into cheers again the moment Biggio dragged Bagwell onto the playing field and to the first base line. "The thing with Baggy is that he and I worked so hard here for this city and for this organization," Biggio remarked. "We made so many sacrifices as far as playing the game and giving your body to a city, a team." Together, they bowed to the crowd as Bagwell raised Biggio's arm and returned to the dugout.

Moreover, Biggio's milestone safety occurred one day before the 19th anniversary of his first major league hit—also a single—off Orel Hershiser on June 29, 1988. During regulation, Biggio also plugged singles in each of the third, fifth, and ninth innings.

In the bottom of the 11th inning, with Colorado having taken a 5–4 lead, Biggio mustered an infield single for his fifth safety of the day, which kicked off a two-out rally against Rockies closer Brian Fuentes. Hunter Pence doubled, and Lance Berkman reached on a hit by pitch, to push Biggio to third base. Carlos Lee then struck a towering walk-off grand slam deep to left to win it for the Astros, 8–5, while bringing home Biggio on the play as the game-tying run.

The slam was the seventh walk-off in club history, succeeding pinch hitter Gregg Zaun's by nearly five years to the day, on June 27, 2002. (Note: The next walk-off grand slam by an Astros player was Brian Bogusevic' ultimate grand slam on August 16, 2011.) His second of the 2007 campaign, the grand slam was also the second in extra innings during Lee's career. "El Caballo" would become the only major leaguer with as many as three extra-inning grand slams during his major league career. Moreover, Lee became tied a club record as the eighth player to hit two grand slams in the same season. (Note: In 2016, George Springer became the first Astro to hit three grand slams in one season.)

==== Rest of June ====
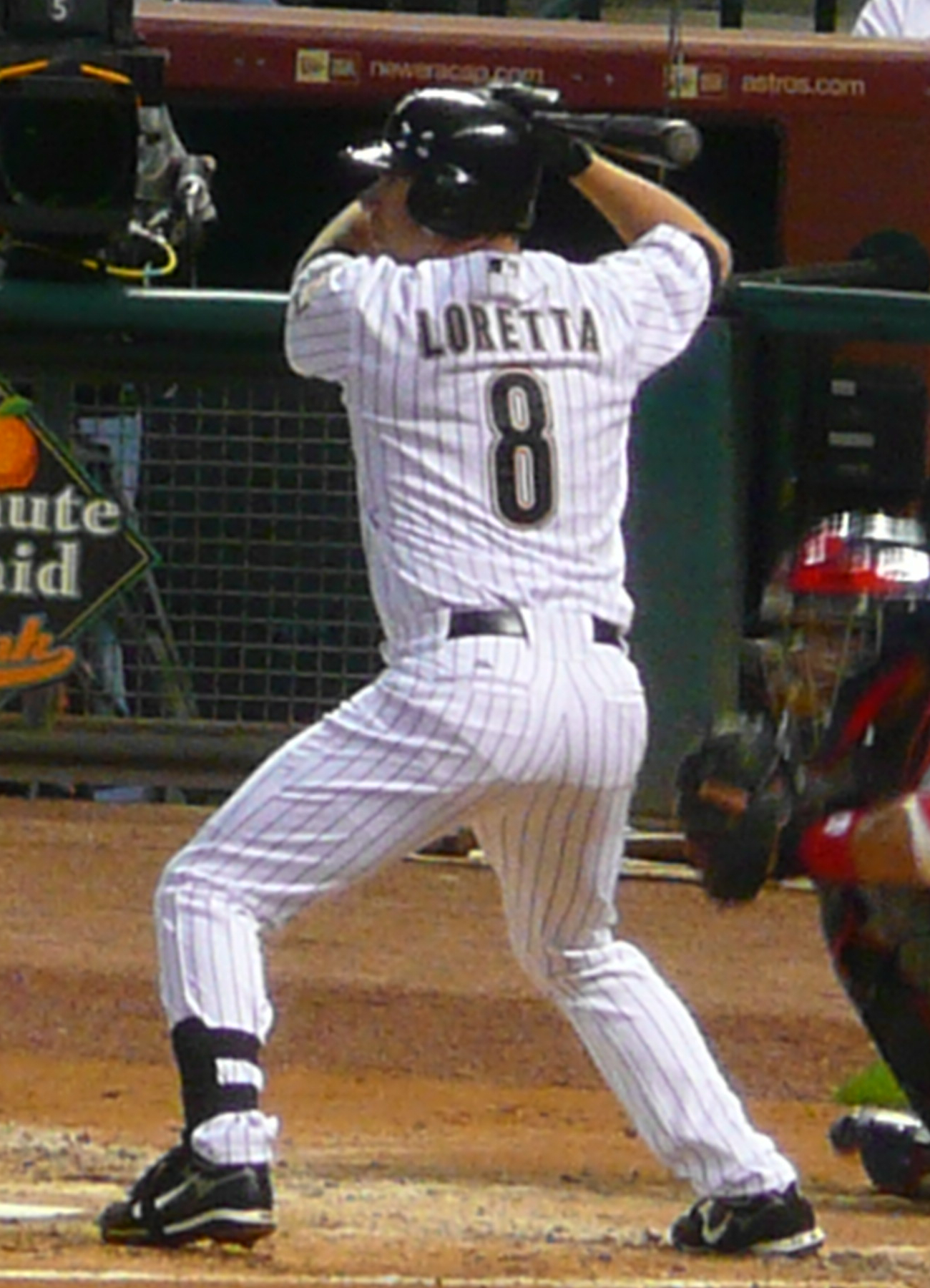
Mark Loretta hit Houston's second consecutive walk-off home run on June 28 and ended the season with a 15-game hitting streak.

Inserted to protect the Rockies' lead on June 29 for a second consecutive evening, Fuentes entered for the bottom of ninth with the Rockies ahead, 8–7. Fuentes retired Houston's first two batters. Next, Fuentes walked Lee, the previous game's walk-off hero, on four pitches. However, Mark Loretta indicated checkmate by punching a walk-off home run deep to left for a 9–8 Houston victory. Earlier, Berkman tripled, homered and dove in three to provide major platform for the win. Catcher Eric Munson picked up 2 RBI. Dave Borkowski (2–3) hurled the final inning to pick up the victory. The walk-off home run was the second of Loretta's career, first in an Astros uniform, and first since April 17, 2006; moreover, for the first time in franchise history, Houston capped successive contests with victories decided by walk-off home runs.

==== July–August ====
On July 1, Craig Biggio was named NL Player of the Week.

With a leadoff double on July 2, Craig Biggio attained the 1,000th extra-base hit of his career, during a 7–5 triumph over Philadelphia. Woody Williams (4–10) delivered a quality start (6 IP, 3 ER) to earn the victory. Hunter Pence homered in the bottom of the fifth inning. Biggio became the 25th Major Leaguer to attain 1,000 extra-base hits, with Rafael Palmeiro having been the most recent entrant. (Note: For combined seasons, in the regular season, requiring extra base hits ≥ 1000, sorted by ascending season.)

Pence slugged his first career walk-off home run on July 3, a fly ball to deep center field. The drive was off a José Mesa offering to seal a 5–4 triumph over Philadelphia in the bottom of the 13th inning.

On July 6, southpaw Wandy Rodríguez hurled his first career shutout, a four-hitter with one base on balls surrendered and 8 strikeouts.

On July 24, Biggio announced that he would be retiring at the end of the 2007 season, his 20th season with the club (and a franchise record). He hit a grand slam in that night's game which broke a 3–3 tie and sparked an Astros' 7–4 triumph over the Los Angeles Dodgers. Biggio's fourth career slam—and second of the campaign—it arrived thirteen years to the day of his most recent prior to 2007. Biggio became the ninth Astro to hit multiple grand slams within the same season, succeeding Carlos Lee on month earlier on June 28.

On July 28, the Astros traded RHP Dan Wheeler to the Tampa Bay Devil Rays for right-handed slugger 3B Ty Wigginton and cash considerations. He was signed through 2009. On July 29, long time and former All-Star third baseman Morgan Ensberg was designated for assignment to make room for newly acquired Wigginton.

On August 2, Mike Lamb's pinch hit grand slam in the top of the eighth inning capped a rally versus the Atlanta Braves to tie the score at 9 apiece. The game proceeded into extra innings, and each team scored twice in the 12th inning. During the top of the 14th, Jason Jennings pinch hit and singled off Óscar Villarreal to plate Jason Lane for the go-ahead and final tally, allowing the Astros to triumph, 12–11. Mark McLemore earned his first major league win, and Brian Moehler registered his first career save. Lamb's grand slam invoked multiple club records: It was the tenth in a pinch hit capacity in team history, succeeding Lane one year earlier on August 29, 2006. Moreover, Lamb became the 10th player in team history and third this campaign to hit multiple grand slams in the same season, joining Carlos Lee on June 28 and Craig Biggio on July 24. Finally, this was Houston's seventh grand slam of the season to tie the club record established in 2001. (Note: The Astros tied the team record again in 2018 and broke it the following year, when they hit 11 regular season grand slams.)

Craig Biggio golfed the final home run of his career on August 21, a leadoff shot to left field at Minute Maid Park off Joe Hanrahan of the Washington Nationals. This was the precursor to a big game for the future Hall of Famer, who went 3-for-6 with a double and 4 RBI. However, the Nationals were too powerful during this contest, scoring each frame between the fourth and seventh innings. Nook Logan countered with 5 hits and Ryan Zimmerman collected 4 RBI as the Nationals routed Houston, 11–6. It was Biggio's third bout of the season having picked up four RBI, establishing career high.

==== Retirement of Jeff Bagwell's uniform number 5 ====
During a pre-game ceremony on August 26, 2007, the club officially retired Bagwell's jersey number 5 ahead of a contest against the Pittsburgh Pirates, becoming the eighth player in Astros history to have his number retired. Having spent his entire 15-year Major League career in Houston, Bagwell attained a number of firsts for the organization, as well career and single-season records. Bagwell was the first Astro to win a Rookie of the Year Award (1991), a Most Valuable Player Award (1994 MVP), the Gold Glove Award for his position (1994), and the first to enter the 30–30 club (1997). A model of consistency, power hitting, and patience, from 1996 to 2001, Bagwell became the first major leaguer to attain each of 100 runs scored, 30 doubles, 30 home runs, 100 runs batted in (RBI) and 100 base on balls (BB) over six consecutive seasons. (Note: Surpassed Lou Gehrig with four consecutive from 1929 to 1932. Gehrig (eight total) and just three other players accumulated six or more total seasons meeting each of the criteria, including Babe Ruth, Ted Williams, and Barry Bonds (6 each). Criteria: Number of seasons player meets criteria, in the regular season: Requiring runs ≥ 100, doubles ≥ 30, home runs ≥ 30, runs batted in ≥ 100 and bases on balls ≥ 100, sorted by descending instances.)

The fourth National League player to be unanimously voted as MVP, in 1994, Bagwell produced single-season team records of a .368 batting average and .750 slugging percentage. Other single-season records followed, including a .454 on-base percentage and 149 walks in 1999, and 47 home runs, 152 runs scored and 363 total bases in 2000. Bagwell retired as the all-time team leader in home runs (449), runs batted in (1,529), walks (1,401), intentional base on balls (155), and sacrifice flies (102). On July 18, 2001, Bagwell became the fourth different Astro to complete the cycle.

Three first bases were embedded in the infield during the game, each embossed with a commemorative insignia that read, "No. 5, Jeff Bagwell jersey retirement, Aug. 26, 2007." One was given to Bagwell and the other two were auctioned to raise funds on behalf of the Astros in Action Foundation.

==== Rest of August ====
On August 27, manager Phil Garner and General Manager Tim Purpura were relieved of their duties. Bench coach Cecil Cooper and Houston's former general, Tal Smith, were named as temporary replacements, respectively. First base coach José Cruz assumed the role as bench coach in Cooper's stead for the remainder of the campaign.

==== September ====
Outfielder Josh Anderson made his major league debut on September 2 at Wrigley Field during the sixth inning. He struck out in his only at bat against the Cubs.

Beginning September 7, Mark Loretta authored the Astros' season-high 15-game hitting streak, during which he hit .420 (21-for-50). Loretta's hitting streak extended through the final day of the season. This was the longest on the team since Willy Taveras strung together a club-record 30 from July 27–August 27, 2006, On September 7, Loretta led a cadre of five Astros each with a multi-hit effort (Pence, Berkman, Luke Scott and Ty Wigginton). The New York Mets routed the Astros, 11–3, in spite of the Houston outhitting New York, 13–12. Former Astro Carlos Beltrán (28) took Wandy Rodríguez (8–13) deep.

Anderson logged his first major league hit on September 14 in a 4–3 defeat to the Pirates, an infield hit to shortstop off Ian Snell during the third inning. In the bottom of the eighth, Anderson singled to left field off Shawn Chacón to plate Cody Ransom for his first RBI. This was the premier of four successive multiple-hit contests, which also spearheaded a nine-game hitting streak.

During his first career 5-hit performance on September 16, Anderson led the Astros to 15–3 triumph over Pittsburgh. Chris Burke went deep (6), collected three hits and four RBI. Cody Ransom (1) and Wigginton (22) also went deep. Starter Brandon Backe (1–1) earned his first win of the year and swatted two hits. Anderson also showcased his first 3-RBI game. The Astros collected 22 hits, their most in a single game since July 18, 1976, during which they also knocked 22 hits and toppled the Montreal Expos, 14–1. It was Houston's first 20-hit game since July 30, 2002, when they routed the New York Mets, 16–3. (Note: For single games, from 1898 to 2026, for HOU, in the regular season, requiring hits ≥ 20, sorted by ascending date.)

On September 17, in a 6–0 loss to the Brewers the Astros were officially eliminated from the 2007 playoffs.

On September 20, Ed Wade was named as the new General Manager of the Astros. He made his first move as GM by trading Jason Lane to the Padres on September 24.

In just his sixth major league game, on September 20, catcher J. R. Towles established a single-game club record with eight runs batted in (RBI). Towles doubled twice, homered, and drew a base on balls and hit by pitch on the way to leading an 18–1 rout of the St. Louis Cardinals (Note: The previous franchise RBI record was seven, accomplished four times: Rafael Ramírez (April 29, 1989), Pete Incaviglia (June 14, 1992) and Bagwell twice (June 21, 2000 and July 8, 2001). Yuli Gurriel tied Towles' record on August 7, 2019.) Towles' doubles and home runs were all the first of his Major League career as he notched four hits total. Cody Ransom, batting just ahead of Towles, scored five runs. He, Mike Lamb (13), and Lance Berkman (22) each doubled in addition to Towles as Houston swatted 23 hits, going 11-for-25 with runners in scoring position. Starter Wandy Rodríguez (9–13) scattered seven hits and one run over eight innings to earn the win. This margin of victory also represented the largest in club history, and was the team's highest single-game scoring output for the season. It was also the second time in four days in which Houston assembled 20 or more hits, and was two short of the franchise all-time record first established on May 30, 1976, during which they tripped the Atlanta Braves, 16–5. This was also just the third season in club history in the Astros assembled multiple 20-hit games within the same campaign (1976, 2002).

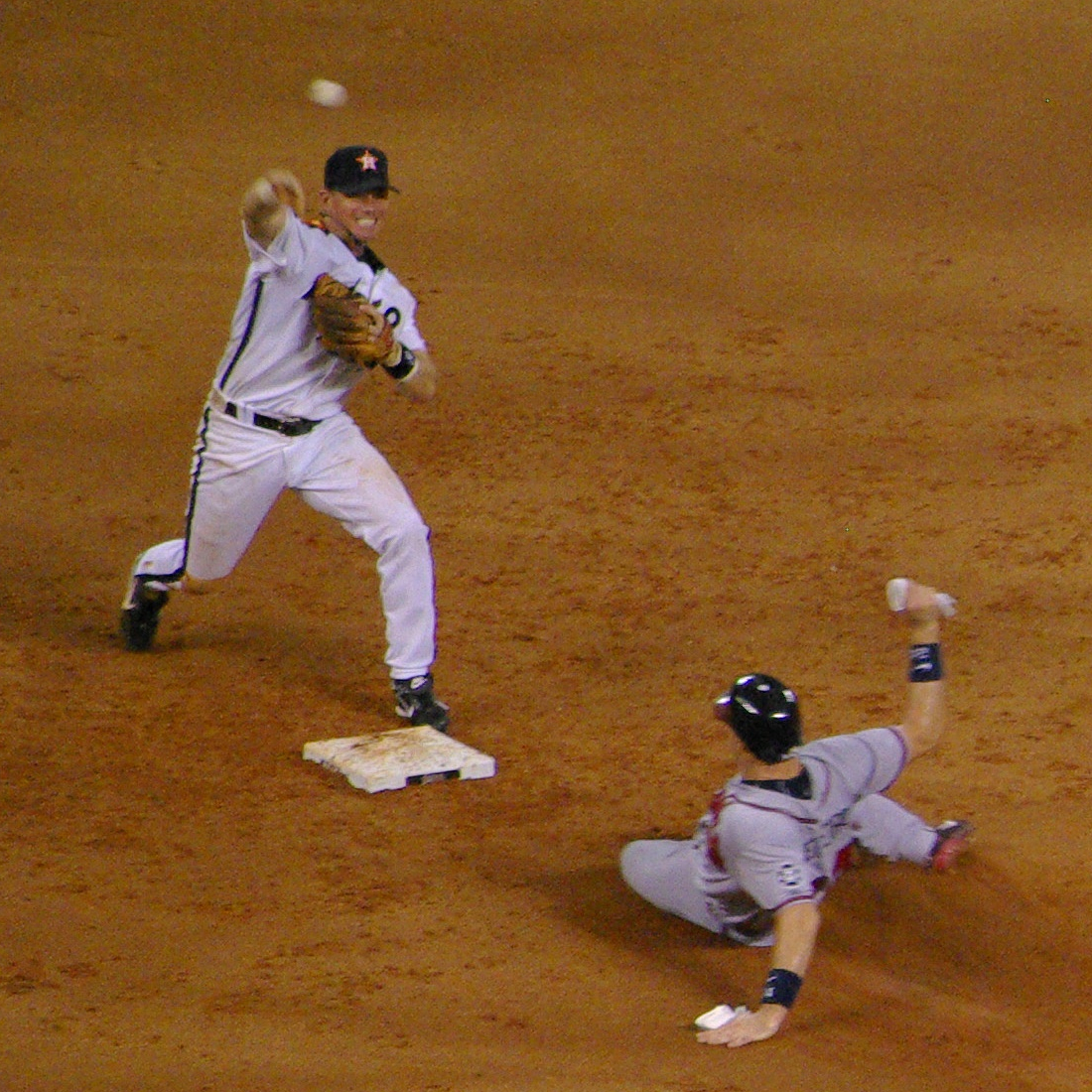
Craig Biggio (left) and Mark Teixeira on September 28, 2007

Towles also ended each of his first 41 plate appearance and 38 at bats in the major leagues without having been retired via strikeout, a streak that concluded on September 28 versus the Atlanta Braves. He had made his major league debut on September 5 in a 14–2 loss to the Milwaukee Brewers at Miller Park. These streaks were second to the franchise records of 43 plate appearances and 41 at bats established by infielder Alex Taveras on September 29, 1976.

During the regular season finale on September 30 at Minute Maid Park, Craig Biggio retired, ending a 20-year playing career with the Astros, also his final game on the field. He was 1-for-4. During the bottom of the first inning, Biggio doubled off Buddy Carlyle (8–7) as the each of Houston first five batters reached base. Carlos Lee hit a two-run single that scored Biggio, and Hunter Pence doubled to deep left center field, scoring Lance Berkman to give the Astros a 3–0 advantage. This remained as the margin in a 3–0 victory over the Atlanta Braves. Felipe Paulino (2–1) tossed six scoreless innings to pick up the win, while Dave Borkowski struck out the side in the top of the ninth to earn his only major league save.

Anderson appeared in 15 of the Astros' final 16 games. In 14 of those, he logged at least one base hit, and ended the season with a five-game hitting streak.

The Astros won five of their final six games of the season, and 10 of 15.

==== Performance overview ====
The Houston Astros concluded the 2007 season with a record of 73–89, in fourth place in the NL Central division, and 12 games behind the division-champion Cubs, for their first season with a losing record since 2000 (72–90). The prior six consecutive winning seasons at the time was the second-longest streak in club annals, with each resulting in either a first or second place standing. (Note: The longest streak of 7 winning campaigns in club history was also broken by the results of the 2000 season, having spanned from 1993 through 1999.) Moreover, beginning in 1992, the 2000 and 2007 campaigns represented the only occasions in which Houston had finished below .500 overall, part of one of the most successful periods in franchise history.

Having produced a home record of 42–39, it was the seventh consecutive season the club concluded with a winning record at Minute Maid Park. The team drew 3,020,405 fans in attendance, exceeding the threshold of 3 million over consecutive seasons for the first time in club history, and fourth time overall since 2000.

This Astros edition tied a club record by hitting seven grand slams, first established in 2001. Two each were hit by Carlos Lee, Craig Biggio, and Mike Lamb, signifying the first instance in which more than one Astro hit multiple grand slams within the same season. They tied the regular season record again in 2018; it stood until the following campaign, when they hit 11 regular-season grand slams.

Biggio retired as one of three Major Leaguers having reached or exceeded each of 2,500 hits, 500 doubles, 400 stolen bases, and 250 home runs. The other two players are Rickey Henderson and Barry Bonds. Biggio also held, at the time, the most doubles by a right-handed batter in Major League history (668). (Note: Since passed by Albert Pujols.) Following the season, Biggio became the first repeat winner of the Heart & Hustle Award (Note: This was the third season of the Heart & Hustle award.) the first Astro to receive recognition with the Roberto Clemente, and his 3,000th hit was distinguished as MLB.com's This Year in Baseball Best Moment.

To commemorate the 50th anniversary of the issuance of the Gold Glove Award, former Colt .45s/Astros second baseman Joe Morgan recognized for his career defensive performance as part of the All-time Gold Glove Team.

Outfielder Carlos Lee won his second career Silver Slugger Award and first as a Houston Astro. Lee became the third outfielder to be recognized as a member of the Astros, joining José Cruz (1983 and 1984) and Moisés Alou (1998). The most recent winner at any position for the club was Morgan Ensberg in 2005.

For the first time since 2002, the Astros had two sluggers reach the 30-home run plateau (Berkman, Lee). During his first year as an Astro of six after having signed as a free agent over the offseason, Lee also drove in a career-best 119 runs. Rookie Hunter Pence added 17 home runs, at the time, the third-highest for a rookie in club history, following Berkman (21 in 2000) and Glenn Davis (20 in 1985).

=== League standings ===
==== National League Central ====
NL Central
| Team | W | L | Pct. | GB | Home | Road |
|---|---|---|---|---|---|---|
| Chicago Cubs | 85 | 77 | .525 | — | 44‍–‍37 | 41‍–‍40 |
| Milwaukee Brewers | 83 | 79 | .512 | 2 | 51‍–‍30 | 32‍–‍49 |
| St. Louis Cardinals | 78 | 84 | .481 | 7 | 43‍–‍38 | 35‍–‍46 |
| Houston Astros | 73 | 89 | .451 | 12 | 42‍–‍39 | 31‍–‍50 |
| Cincinnati Reds | 72 | 90 | .444 | 13 | 39‍–‍42 | 33‍–‍48 |
| Pittsburgh Pirates | 68 | 94 | .420 | 17 | 37‍–‍44 | 31‍–‍50 |

==== Record versus opponents ====
National League

2007 National League record Source: MLB Standings Grid – 2007
| Team | AZ | ATL | CHC | CIN | COL | FLA | HOU | LAD | MIL | NYM | PHI | PIT | SD | SF | STL | WAS | AL |
|---|---|---|---|---|---|---|---|---|---|---|---|---|---|---|---|---|---|
| Arizona | — | 4–2 | 4–2 | 2–4 | 8–10 | 6–1 | 5–2 | 8–10 | 2–5 | 3–4 | 5–1 | 5–4 | 10–8 | 10–8 | 4–3 | 6–1 | 8–7 |
| Atlanta | 2–4 | — | 5–4 | 1–6 | 4–2 | 10–8 | 3–3 | 4–3 | 5–2 | 9–9 | 9–9 | 5–1 | 5–2 | 4–3 | 3–4 | 11–7 | 4–11 |
| Chicago | 2–4 | 4–5 | — | 9–9 | 5–2 | 0–6 | 8–7 | 2–5 | 9–6 | 2–5 | 3–4 | 8–7 | 3–5 | 5–2 | 11–5 | 6–1 | 8–4 |
| Cincinnati | 4–2 | 6–1 | 9–9 | — | 2–4 | 4–3 | 4–11 | 2–4 | 8–7 | 2–5 | 2–4 | 9–7 | 2–4 | 4–3 | 6–9 | 1–6 | 7–11 |
| Colorado | 10–8 | 2–4 | 2–5 | 4–2 | — | 3–3 | 3–4 | 12–6 | 4–2 | 4–2 | 4–3 | 4–3 | 11–8 | 10–8 | 3–4 | 4–3 | 10–8 |
| Florida | 1–6 | 8–10 | 6–0 | 3–4 | 3–3 | — | 2–3 | 4–3 | 2–5 | 7–11 | 9–9 | 3–4 | 3–4 | 1–6 | 2–4 | 8–10 | 9–9 |
| Houston | 2–5 | 3–3 | 7–8 | 11–4 | 4–3 | 3–2 | — | 4–3 | 5–13 | 2–5 | 3–3 | 5–10 | 4–3 | 2–4 | 7–9 | 2–5 | 9–9 |
| Los Angeles | 10–8 | 3–4 | 5–2 | 4–2 | 6–12 | 3–4 | 3–4 | — | 3–3 | 5–5 | 4–2 | 5–2 | 8–10 | 10–8 | 3–3 | 5–1 | 5–10 |
| Milwaukee | 5–2 | 2–5 | 6–9 | 7–8 | 2–4 | 5–2 | 13–5 | 3–3 | — | 2–4 | 3–4 | 10–6 | 2–5 | 4–5 | 7–8 | 4–2 | 8–7 |
| New York | 4–3 | 9–9 | 5–2 | 5–2 | 2–4 | 11–7 | 5–2 | 5–5 | 4–2 | — | 6–12 | 4–2 | 2–4 | 4–2 | 5–2 | 9–9 | 8–7 |
| Philadelphia | 1–5 | 9–9 | 4–3 | 4–2 | 3–4 | 9–9 | 3–3 | 2–4 | 4–3 | 12–6 | — | 4–2 | 4–3 | 4–4 | 6–3 | 12–6 | 8–7 |
| Pittsburgh | 4–5 | 1–5 | 7–8 | 7–9 | 3–4 | 4–3 | 10–5 | 2–5 | 6–10 | 2–4 | 2–4 | — | 1–6 | 4–2 | 6–12 | 4–2 | 5–10 |
| San Diego | 8–10 | 2–5 | 5–3 | 4–2 | 8–11 | 4–3 | 3–4 | 10–8 | 5–2 | 4–2 | 3–4 | 6–1 | — | 14–4 | 3–4 | 4–2 | 6–9 |
| San Francisco | 8–10 | 3–4 | 2–5 | 3–4 | 8–10 | 6–1 | 4–2 | 8–10 | 5–4 | 2–4 | 4–4 | 2–4 | 4–14 | — | 4–1 | 3–4 | 5–10 |
| St. Louis | 3–4 | 4–3 | 5–11 | 9–6 | 4–3 | 4–2 | 9–7 | 3–3 | 8–7 | 2–5 | 3–6 | 12–6 | 4–3 | 1–4 | — | 1–5 | 6–9 |
| Washington | 1–6 | 7–11 | 1–6 | 6–1 | 3–4 | 10–8 | 5–2 | 1–5 | 2–4 | 9–9 | 6–12 | 2–4 | 2–4 | 4–3 | 5–1 | — | 9–9 |

=== Roster ===
2007 Houston Astros
Roster
| Pitchers: 37 Matt Albers; 41 Brandon Backe; 58 Dave Borkowski; 38 Travis Driskill; 71 Juan Gutiérrez; 23 Jason Jennings; 54 Brad Lidge; 62 Mark McLemore; 47 Trever Miller; 36 Brian Moehler; 44 Roy Oswalt; 65 Troy Patton; 52 Felipe Paulino; 50 Chad Qualls; 63 Stephen Randolph; 51 Wandy Rodríguez; 43 Chris Sampson; 59 Dennis Sarfate; 35 Dan Wheeler; 21 Rick White; 29 Woody Williams | Catchers: 11 Brad Ausmus; 13 Eric Munson; 55 Humberto Quintero; 46 J. R. Towles; Infielders: 17 Lance Berkman; 7 Craig Biggio; 4 Eric Bruntlett; 2 Chris Burke; 14 Morgan Ensberg; 28 Adam Everett; 26 Mike Lamb; 8 Mark Loretta; 10 Cody Ransom; 21 Ty Wigginton | Outfielders: 20 Josh Anderson; 16 Jason Lane; 45 Carlos Lee; 19 Orlando Palmeiro; 9 Hunter Pence; 30 Luke Scott | Manager: 3 Phil Garner; Coaches: 6 Mark Bailey (bullpen); 27 Sean Berry (hitting); 15 Cecil Cooper (bench); 25 José Cruz (first base); 29 Doug Mansolino (third base); 31 Dave Wallace (pitching) |

== Game log ==
=== Regular season ===
Legend
| | Astros win |
| | Astros loss |
| | Postponement |
| | Eliminated from playoff race |
| **Bold** | Astros team member |

2007 regular season game log: 73–89 (Home: 42–39; Away: 31–50)
April: 10–14 (Home: 4–7; Away: 6–7)

| # | Date | Time (CT) | Opponent | Score | Win | Loss | Save | Time of game | Attendance | Record | Box/ streak |
|---|---|---|---|---|---|---|---|---|---|---|---|
| 1 | April 2 | | Pirates | 4 – 2 (10) | Capps (1–0) | **Qualls** (0–1) | Torres (1) | | 43,803 | 0-1 | |
| 2 | April 3 | | Pirates | 3 – 2 | Bayliss (1–0) | **Wheeler** (0–1) | Torres (2) | | 31,238 | 0-2 | |
| 3 | April 4 | | Pirates | 5 – 4 | Gorzelanny (1–0) | **Williams** (0–1) | Torres (3) | | 25,961 | 0-3 | |
| 4 | April 6 | | Cardinals | 4 – 2 | Wainwright (1–0) | **Rodríguez** (0–1) | Isringhausen (1) | | 43,430 | 0-4 | |
| 5 | April 7 | | Cardinals | 5 – 1 | **Oswalt** (1–0) | Reyes (0–1) | | | 41,885 | 1-4 | |
| 6 | April 8 | | Cardinals | 10 – 1 | Wells (1-1) | **Jennings** (0–1) | | | 36,273 | 1-5 | |
| 7 | April 9 | | @ Cubs | 5 – 3 | **Qualls** (1-1) | Howry (0–2) | **Wheeler** (1) | | 41,388 | 2-5 | |
| 8 | April 10 | | @ Cubs | 4 – 2 | **Sampson** (1–0) | Marquis (0–1) | | | 35,924 | 3-5 | |
| -- | April 11 | | @ Cubs | Postponed (snow) Rescheduled for June 11 | | | | | | | |
| 9 | April 13 | | @ Phillies | 9 – 6 | **Oswalt** (2–0) | Myers (0–1) | **Wheeler** (2) | | 44,336 | 4-5 | |
| 10 | April 14 | | @ Phillies | 8 – 5 | Hamels (1–0) | **Williams** (0–2) | Gordon (2) | | 35,387 | 4-6 | |
| -- | April 15 | | @ Phillies | Postponed (rain) Rescheduled for April 23 | | | | | | | |
| 11 | April 16 | | Marlins | 4 – 3 | **Qualls** (2–1) | Gregg (0–1) | | | 30,665 | 5-6 | |
| 12 | April 17 | | Marlins | 6 – 1 | **Oswalt** (3–0) | Julio (0–2) | | | 38,106 | 6-6 | |
| 13 | April 18 | | @ Reds | 7 – 2 | **Sampson** (2–0) | Coffey (1-1) | | | 13,772 | 7-6 | |
| 14 | April 19 | | @ Reds | 8 – 6 | **Lidge** (1–0) | Weathers (0–2) | **Wheeler** (3) | | 14,222 | 8-6 | |
| 15 | April 20 | | @ Brewers | 6 – 5 | **White** (1–0) | Wise (0–1) | **Qualls** (1) | | 41,522 | 9-6 | |
| 16 | April 21 | | @ Brewers | 6 – 4 | Capuano (3–0) | **Rodríguez** (0–2) | Cordero (6) | | 41,209 | 9-7 | |
| 17 | April 22 | | @ Brewers | 4 – 3 | Bush (2–1) | **Oswalt** (3–1) | Cordero (7) | | 31,985 | 9-8 | |
| 18 | April 23 | | @ Phillies | 11 – 4 | Eaton (2–1) | **Sampson** (2–1) | | | 32,517 | 9-9 | |
| 19 | April 24 | | @ Pirates | 3 – 0 | Maholm (1–2) | **Williams** (0–3) | | | 13,062 | 9-10 | |
| 20 | April 25 | | @ Pirates | 4 – 3 (16) | Wasdin (1-1) | **Moehler** (0–1) | | | 8,201 | 9-11 | |
| 21 | April 26 | | @ Pirates | 5 – 3 | Bayliss (2–1) | **Rodríguez** (0–3) | Grabow (1) | | 12,056 | 9-12 | |
| 22 | April 27 | | Brewers | 4 – 1 | Capuano (4–0) | **Oswalt** (3–2) | Cordero (9) | | 40,530 | 9-13 | |
| 23 | April 28 | | Brewers | 10 – 1 | **Sampson** (3–1) | Bush (2-2) | | | 41,004 | 10-13 | |
| 24 | April 29 | | Brewers | 3 – 1 | Vargas (2–0) | **Williams** (0–4) | Cordero (10) | | 37,114 | 10-14 | |

May 12–17 (Home: 8–7; Away: 4–10)

| # | Date | Time (CT) | Opponent | Score | Win | Loss | Save | Time of game | Attendance | Record | Box/ streak |
|---|---|---|---|---|---|---|---|---|---|---|---|
| 25 | May 1 | | Reds | 11 – 2 | Arroyo (1–2) | **Albers** (0–1) | | | 30,361 | 10-15 | |
| 26 | May 2 | | Reds | 3 – 1 | **Oswalt** (4–2) | Lohse (1–2) | **Wheeler** (4) | | 29,468 | 11-15 | |
| 27 | May 3 | | Reds | 7 – 5 | **Qualls** (3–1) | Stanton (1-1) | **Wheeler** (5) | | 29,931 | 12-15 | |
| 28 | May 4 | | @ Cardinals | 3 – 2 | Wainwright (2-2) | **Williams** (0–5) | Isringhausen (7) | | 44,117 | 12-16 | |
| 29 | May 5 | | @ Cardinals | 13 – 0 | **Albers** (1-1) | Wells (1–6) | | | 44,881 | 13-16 | |
| 30 | May 6 | | @ Cardinals | 3 – 1 | Looper (4–2) | **Sampson** (3–2) | Isringhausen (8) | | 44,453 | 13-17 | |
| 31 | May 7 | | @ Reds | 5 – 4 | **Oswalt** (5–2) | Lohse (1–3) | **Wheeler** (6) | | 17,362 | 14-17 | |
| 32 | May 8 | | @ Reds | 7 – 6 | **Lidge** (2–0) | Salmon (0–1) | **Wheeler** (7) | | 16,264 | 15-17 | |
| 33 | May 9 | | @ Reds | 3 – 2 | **Williams** (1–5) | Belisle (3–2) | **Wheeler** (8) | | 16,278 | 16-17 | |
| 34 | May 10 | | @ Reds | 9 – 5 | Harang (5–1) | **Albers** (1–2) | Weathers (7) | | 25,796 | 16-18 | |
| 35 | May 11 | | D-backs | 3 – 1 | Webb (3–2) | **Sampson** (3-3) | | | 36,080 | 16-19 | |
| 36 | May 12 | | D-backs | 10 – 4 | **Oswalt** (6–2) | Hernández (3–2) | | | 36,142 | 17-19 | |
| 37 | May 13 | | D-backs | 5 – 2 | **Rodríguez** (1–3) | Davis (2–4) | | | 37,230 | 18-19 | |
| 38 | May 15 | | Giants | 6 – 5 (10) | **Qualls** (4–1) | Sánchez (1-1) | | | 33,490 | 19-19 | |
| 39 | May 16 | | Giants | 2 – 1 | **Sampson** (4–3) | Lowry (4-4) | | | 33,533 | 20-19 | |
| 40 | May 17 | | Giants | 2 – 1 (12) | Chulk (1–2) | **Lidge** (1–2) | Benítez (8) | | 36,815 | 20-20 | |
| 41 | May 18 | | Rangers | 7 – 4 | Tejeda (4–3) | **Albers** (1–3) | Gagné (2) | | 37,634 | 20-21 | |
| 42 | May 19 | | Rangers | 6 – 1 | **Rodríguez** (2–3) | Koronka (0–1) | | | 41,990 | 21-21 | |
| 43 | May 20 | | Rangers | 14 – 1 | McCarthy (4-4) | **Williams** (1–6) | | | 39,938 | 21-22 | |
| 44 | May 21 | | @ Giants | 4 – 0 | Lowry (5–4) | **Sampson** (4-4) | | | 35,768 | 21-23 | |
| 45 | May 22 | | @ Giants | 4 – 2 | Lincecum (2–0) | **Oswalt** (6–3) | Benítez (9) | | 35,134 | 21-24 | |
| 46 | May 23 | | @ Giants | 9 – 1 | Zito (4–5) | **Albers** (1–4) | | | 35,521 | 21-25 | |
| 47 | May 24 | | @ D-backs | 9 – 1 | Owings (3–1) | **Rodríguez** (2–4) | | | 18,130 | 21-26 | |
| 48 | May 25 | | @ D-backs | 13 – 3 | González (2-2) | **Williams** (1–7) | | | 23,298 | 21-27 | |
| 49 | May 26 | | @ D-backs | 5 – 4 | Webb (4–3) | **Sampson** (4–5) | Valverde (18) | | 27,836 | 21-28 | |
| 50 | May 27 | | @ D-backs | 8 – 4 | Hernández (5–2) | **Oswalt** (6–4) | | | 26,621 | 21-29 | |
| 51 | May 29 | | Reds | 2 – 1 | Belisle (5–4) | **Qualls** (4–2) | Weathers (10) | | 33,565 | 21-30 | |
| 52 | May 30 | | Reds | 4 – 3 | Harang (6–2) | **Rodríguez** (2–5) | | | 31,904 | 21-31 | |
| 53 | May 31 | | Reds | 10 – 2 | **Williams** (2–7) | Arroyo (2–6) | | | 30,336 | 22-31 | |

June: 12–16 (Home: 7–5; Away: 5–11)

| # | Date | Time (CT) | Opponent | Score | Win | Loss | Save | Time of game | Attendance | Record | Box/ streak |
|---|---|---|---|---|---|---|---|---|---|---|---|
| 54 | June 1 | | Cardinals | 8 – 1 | Franklin (2–0) | **Qualls** (4–3) | | | 36,784 | 22-32 | |
| 55 | June 2 | | Cardinals | 8 – 3 | **Sampson** (5-5) | Wells (2–10) | | | 39,234 | 23-32 | |
| 56 | June 3 | | Cardinals | 8 – 6 (10) | Isringhausen (2–0) | **Wheeler** (0–2) | | | 40,483 | 23-33 | |
| 57 | June 5 | | @ Rockies | 4 – 1 | **Rodríguez** (3–5) | Hirsh (2–6) | **Wheeler** (10) | | 27,101 | 24-33 | |
| 58 | June 6 | | @ Rockies | 8 – 7 | Buchholz (3-3) | **Williams** (2–8) | Fuentes (17) | | 22,471 | 24-34 | |
| 59 | June 7 | | @ Rockies | 7 – 6 | Affeldt (3–1) | **Wheeler** (0–3) | | | 22,103 | 24-35 | |
| 60 | June 8 | | @ White Sox | 5 – 2 | **Sampson** (6–5) | Danks (3–6) | **Wheeler** (11) | | 33,212 | 25-35 | |
| 61 | June 9 | | @ White Sox | 3 – 2 | **Qualls** (5–3) | Jenks (2-2) | | | 36,616 | 26-35 | |
| 62 | June 10 | | @ White Sox | 6 – 3 | Buehrle (3-3) | **Rodríguez** (3–6) | Jenks (17) | | 33,433 | 26-36 | |
| 63 | June 11 | | @ Cubs | 2 – 1 | Zambrano (7–5) | **Williams** (2–9) | Dempster (13) | | 37,947 | 26-37 | |
| 64 | June 12 | | Athletics | 5 – 4 (11) | **Borkowski** (1–0) | Flores (0–1) | | | 33,637 | 27-37 | |
| 65 | June 13 | | Athletics | 7 – 3 | Blanton (6–4) | **Wheeler** (0–3) | | | 34,611 | 27-38 | |
| 66 | June 14 | | Athletics | 6 – 5 (11) | Embree (1–0) | **Moehler** (0–2) | Casilla (2) | | 42,024 | 27-39 | |
| 67 | June 15 | | Mariners | 5 – 1 | **Rodríguez** (4–6) | Hernández (3–4) | | | 37,322 | 28-39 | |
| 68 | June 16 | | Mariners | 9 – 4 | **Williams** (3–9) | Baek (3-3) | | | 41,974 | 29-39 | |
| 69 | June 17 | | Mariners | 10 – 3 | **Oswalt** (7–4) | Washburn (5–6) | | | 42,019 | 30-39 | |
| 70 | June 18 | | @ Angels | 10 – 9 | Rodríguez (1–2) | **Borkowski** (1-1) | | | 42,232 | 30-40 | |
| 71 | June 19 | | @ Angels | 9 – 5 | **Jennings** (1-1) | Colón (6–3) | | | 42,156 | 31-40 | |
| 72 | June 20 | | @ Angels | 8 – 4 | Carrasco (2–1) | **Borkowski** (1–2) | | | 40,761 | 31-41 | |
| 73 | June 22 | | @ Rangers | 11 – 3 | Millwood (4–6) | **Williams** (3–10) | | | 37,847 | 31-42 | |
| 74 | June 23 | | @ Rangers | 7 – 2 | Wright (1-1) | **Oswalt** (7–5) | | | 42,315 | 31-43 | |
| 75 | June 24 | | @ Rangers | 12 – 9 (10) | **Wheeler** (1–4) | Wilson (0–1) | **Qualls** (2) | | 31,560 | 32-43 | |
| 76 | June 25 | | @ Brewers | 5 – 1 | Sheets (9–3) | **Jennings** (1–2) | | | 28,786 | 32-44 | |
| 77 | June 26 | | @ Brewers | 11 – 5 | Wise (2–1) | **Rodríguez** (4–7) | | | 30,713 | 32-45 | |
| 78 | June 27 | | @ Brewers | 6 – 3 (11) | Bush (6-6) | **Borkowski** (1–3) | | | 31,862 | 32-46 | |
| 79 | June 28 | | Rockies | 8 – 5 (11) | **Moehler** (1–2) | Fuentes (0–3) | | | 42,537 | 33-46 | |
| 80 | June 29 | | Rockies | 9 – 8 | **Borkowski** (2–3) | Fuentes (0–4) | | | 42,861 | 34-46 | |
| 81 | June 30 | | Rockies | 5 – 0 | Francis (8–5) | **Jennings** (1–3) | | | 43,071 | 34-47 | |

July: 12–13 (Home: 9–6; Away: 3–7)

| # | Date | Time (CT) | Opponent | Score | Win | Loss | Save | Time of game | Attendance | Record | Box/ streak |
|---|---|---|---|---|---|---|---|---|---|---|---|
| 82 | July 1 | | Rockies | 12 – 0 | **Rodríguez** (5–7) | López (4–2) | | | 35,260 | 35-47 | |
| 83 | July 2 | | Phillies | 7 – 5 | **Williams** (4–10) | Moyer (7–6) | **Miller** (1) | | 28,973 | 36-47 | |
| 84 | July 3 | | Phillies | 5 – 4 (13) | **Albers** (2–4) | Mesa (0–1) | | | 37,997 | 37-47 | |
| 85 | July 4 | | Phillies | 8 – 3 | Hamels (10–4) | **Sampson** (6-6) | | | 39,993 | 37-48 | |
| 86 | July 5 | | Mets | 6 – 2 | Maine (10–4) | **Jennings** (1–4) | | | 35,430 | 37-49 | |
| 87 | July 6 | | Mets | 4 – 0 | **Rodríguez** (6–7) | Pelfrey (0–7) | | | 38,812 | 38-49 | |
| 88 | July 7 | | Mets | 5 – 3 (17) | Sele (2–0) | **Moehler** (1–3) | Wagner (17) | | 41,596 | 38-50 | |
| 89 | July 8 | | Mets | 8 – 3 | **Oswalt** (8–5) | Williams (0–1) | | | 40,708 | 39-50 | |
| — | July 10 | 7:00 p.m. CDT | **78th All-Star Game in San Francisco, CA** | | | | | | | | |
| 90 | July 13 | | @ Cubs | 6 – 0 | Zambrano (11–7) | **Jennings** (1–5) | | | 41,593 | 39-51 | |
| 91 | July 14 | | @ Cubs | 9 – 3 | Lilly (9–4) | **Oswalt** (8–6) | | | 41,448 | 39-52 | |
| 92 | July 15 | | @ Cubs | 7 – 6 | Wuertz (2-2) | **Rodríguez** (6–8) | Howry (5) | | 41,757 | 39-53 | |
| 93 | July 16 | | @ Nationals | 4 – 3 | Rivera (4–2) | **Williams** (4–11) | Cordero (16) | | 22,392 | 39-54 | |
| 94 | July 17 | | @ Nationals | 4 – 2 | **Sampson** (7–6) | Redding (1–2) | **Lidge** (1) | | 22,362 | 40-54 | |
| 95 | July 18 | | @ Nationals | 7 – 6 | Bergmann (2–5) | **Jennings** (1–6) | Cordero (17) | | 27,119 | 40-55 | |
| 96 | July 20 | | @ Pirates | 2 – 1 | **Oswalt** (9–6) | Gorzelanny (9–5) | **Lidge** (2) | | 33,541 | 41-55 | |
| 97 | July 21 | | @ Pirates | 7 – 3 | Maholm (6–12) | **Rodríguez** (6–9) | | | 32,068 | 41-56 | |
| 98 | July 22 | | @ Pirates | 1 – 0 | **Williams** (5–11) | Youman (2-2) | **Lidge** (3) | | 22,404 | 42-56 | |
| 99 | July 23 | | Dodgers | 10 – 2 | Billingsley (7–0) | **Sampson** (7-7) | | | 38,245 | 42-57 | |
| 100 | July 24 | | Dodgers | 7 – 4 | **Jennings** (2–6) | Seánez (6–2) | **Lidge** (4) | | 38,247 | 43-57 | |
| 101 | July 25 | | Dodgers | 2 – 1 | **Qualls** (6–3) | Houlton (0–2) | **Lidge** (5) | | 31,498 | 44-57 | |
| 102 | July 26 | | Padres | 7 – 1 | **Rodríguez** (7–9) | Wells (5–7) | | | 33,718 | 45-57 | |
| 103 | July 27 | | Padres | 9 – 4 | Peavy (10–5) | **Williams** (5–12) | | | 39,996 | 45-58 | |
| 104 | July 28 | | Padres | 3 – 1 | **Oswalt** (10–6) | Maddux (7–8) | **Lidge** (6) | | 42.651 | 46-58 | |
| 105 | July 29 | | Padres | 18 – 11 | Brocail (3–1) | **Jennings** (2–7) | | | 39,350 | 46-59 | |
| 106 | July 31 | | @ Braves | 12 – 4 | James (9–8) | **Sampson** (7–8) | | | 32,315 | 46-60 | |

August: 15–14 (Home: 8–8; Away: 7–6)

| # | Date | Time (CT) | Opponent | Score | Win | Loss | Save | Time of game | Attendance | Record | Box/ streak |
|---|---|---|---|---|---|---|---|---|---|---|---|
| 107 | August 1 | | @ Braves | 12 – 3 | Carlyle (6–3) | **Rodríguez** (7–10) | | | 30,785 | 46-61 | |
| 108 | August 2 | | @ Braves | 12 – 11 (14) | **McLemore** (1–0) | Villarreal (1-1) | **Moehler** (1) | | 35,659 | 47-61 | |
| 109 | August 3 | | @ Marlins | 8 – 2 | **Oswalt** (11–6) | Willis (7–11) | | | 15,226 | 48-61 | |
| 110 | August 4 | | @ Marlins | 6 – 5 (12) | Gardner (3–2) | **Randolph** (0–1) | | | 22,112 | 48-62 | |
| 111 | August 5 | | @ Marlins | 6 – 5 | Olsen (9-9) | **Albers** (2–5) | Gregg (23) | | 14,622 | 48-63 | |
| 112 | August 6 | | Cubs | 2 – 1 (10) | **Lidge** (3–1) | Wuertz (2–3) | | | 36,459 | 49-63 | |
| 113 | August 7 | | Cubs | 5 – 2 | **Williams** (6–12) | Marshall (5–6) | **Lidge** (7) | | 37,561 | 50-63 | |
| 114 | August 8 | | Cubs | 8 – 2 | **Oswalt** (12–6) | Zambrano (14–8) | | | 41,655 | 51-63 | |
| 115 | August 10 | | Brewers | 5 – 4 (11) | Spurling (2–1) | **Moehler** (1–4) | Cordero (35) | | 40,211 | 51-64 | |
| 116 | August 11 | | Brewers | 7 – 4 | Linebrink (4–3) | **Lidge** (3–2) | Cordero (36) | | 41,461 | 51-65 | |
| 117 | August 12 | | Brewers | 6 – 4 | **McLemore** (2–0) | Villanueva (6–3) | **Lidge** (8) | | 43,578 | 52-65 | |
| 118 | August 13 | | @ Dodgers | 4 – 1 | **Oswalt** (13–6) | Billingsley (7–4) | **Qualls** (3) | | 49,511 | 53-65 | |
| 119 | August 14 | | @ Dodgers | 7 – 4 | **Albers** (3–5) | Tomko (2–10) | **Lidge** (9) | | 49,399 | 54-65 | |
| 120 | August 15 | | @ Dodgers | 6 – 3 | Penny (14–3) | **Jennings** (2–8) | Saito (30) | | 49,098 | 54-66 | |
| 121 | August 16 | | @ Dodgers | 6 – 2 | Lowe (9–11) | **Rodríguez** (7–11) | Saito (31) | | 48,128 | 54-67 | |
| 122 | August 17 | | @ Padres | 3 – 1 | **Williams** (7–12) | Bell (5–4) | **Lidge** (10) | | 32,063 | 55-67 | |
| 123 | August 18 | | @ Padres | 3 – 2 | **Borkowski** (3-3) | Germano (6–7) | **Lidge** (11) | | 44,272 | 56-67 | |
| 124 | August 19 | | @ Padres | 5 – 3 | Maddux (9-9) | **Albers** (3–6) | Hoffman (31) | | 37,628 | 56-68 | |
| 125 | August 20 | | Nationals | 7 – 0 | Redding (3-3) | **Jennings** (2–9) | | | 30,374 | 56-69 | |
| 126 | August 21 | | Nationals | 11 – 6 | Hanrahan (3–1) | **Rodríguez** (7–12) | | | 34,073 | 56-70 | |
| 127 | August 22 | | Nationals | 3 – 2 | **Williams** (8–12) | Bacsik (5–7) | **Lidge** (12) | | 32,023 | 57-70 | |
| 128 | August 23 | | Nationals | 7 – 6 | Lannan (2-2) | **Gutiérrez** (0–1) | Cordero (28) | | 36,407 | 57-71 | |
| 129 | August 24 | | Pirates | 8 – 3 (15) | Youman (3–4) | **Driskill** (0–1) | | | 41,403 | 57-72 | |
| 130 | August 25 | | Pirates | 4 – 1 | Morris (8-8) | **Patton** (0–1) | Capps (13) | | 41,109 | 57-73 | |
| 131 | August 26 | | Pirates | 5 – 4 | **McLemore** (3–0) | Chacón (4-4) | **Lidge** (13) | | 42,564 | 58-73 | |
| 132 | August 28 | | Cardinals | 7 – 0 | Looper (11–10) | **Williams** (8–13) | | | 37,915 | 58-74 | |
| 133 | August 29 | | Cardinals | 7 – 0 | **Oswalt** (14–6) | Wells (6–15) | | | 33,422 | 59-74 | |
| 134 | August 30 | | Cardinals | 2 – 1 | **Albers** (4–6) | Piñeiro (4–3) | **Lidge** (14) | | 37,520 | 60-74 | |
| 135 | August 31 | | @ Cubs | 6 – 1 | **Rodríguez** (8–12) | Marshall (7-7) | | | 41,297 | 61-74 | |

September: 12–15 (Home: 6–6; Away: 6–9)

| # | Date | Time (CT) | Opponent | Score | Win | Loss | Save | Time of game | Attendance | Record | Box/ streak |
|---|---|---|---|---|---|---|---|---|---|---|---|
| 136 | September 1 | | @ Cubs | 4 – 3 | Marquis (11–8) | **Patton** (0–2) | Dempster (24) | | 40,606 | 61-75 | |
| 137 | September 2 | | @ Cubs | 6 – 5 | Mármol (5–1) | **Qualls** (6–4) | Dempster (25) | | 41,415 | 61-76 | |
| 138 | September 3 | | @ Brewers | 9 – 7 | **Borkowski** (4–3) | Aquino (0–1) | **Qualls** (4) | | 31,226 | 62-76 | |
| 139 | September 4 | | @ Brewers | 5 – 3 | Villanueva (7–3) | **Backe** (0–1) | Cordero (40) | | 25,854 | 62-77 | |
| 140 | September 5 | | @ Brewers | 14 – 2 | Gallardo (7–4) | **Albers** (4–7) | | | 28,988 | 62-78 | |
| 141 | September 7 | | @ Mets | 11 – 3 | Pelfrey (2–7) | **Rodríguez** (8–13) | | | 51,113 | 62-79 | |
| 142 | September 8 | | @ Mets | 3 – 1 | Glavine (13–6) | **Williams** (8–14) | Wagner (31) | | 53,061 | 62-80 | |
| 143 | September 9 | | @ Mets | 4 – 1 | Martínez (2–0) | **Oswalt** (14–7) | Wagner (32) | | 51,847 | 62-81 | |
| 144 | September 11 | | Cubs | 5 – 4 (11) | **Lidge** (4–2) | Dempster (2–6) | | | 33,493 | 63-81 | |
| 145 | September 12 | | Cubs | 3 – 2 | Hill (9–8) | **Albers** (4–8) | Dempster (26) | | 33,115 | 63-82 | |
| 146 | September 13 | | Cubs | 6 – 2 | Trachsel (7–10) | **Williams** (8–15) | | | 34,234 | 63-83 | |
| 147 | September 14 | | Pirates | 4 – 3 | Sánchez (1–0) | **Qualls** (6–5) | Capps (17) | | 35,352 | 63-84 | |
| 148 | September 15 | | Pirates | 9 – 7 | **Gutiérrez** (1-1) | Morris (9–10) | **Lidge** (15) | | 40,425 | 64-84 | |
| 149 | September 16 | | Pirates | 15 – 3 | **Backe** (1-1) | Maholm (10–15) | | | 35,715 | 65-84 | |
| 150 | September 17 | | Brewers | 6 – 0 | Gallardo (9–4) | **Albers** (4–9) | | | 32,578 | 65-85 | |
| 151 | September 18 | | Brewers | 9 – 1 | Vargas (11–4) | **Paulino** (0–1) | | | 32,866 | 65-86 | |
| 152 | September 19 | | Brewers | 5 – 4 (10) | **Lidge** (5–2) | Wise (3–2) | | | 36,981 | 66-86 | |
| 153 | September 20 | | @ Cardinals | 18 – 1 | **Rodríguez** (9–13) | Looper (12–11) | | | 42,171 | 67-86 | |
| 154 | September 21 | | @ Cardinals | 6 – 3 | **Backe** (2–1) | Piñeiro (6–5) | **Lidge** (16) | | 43,677 | 68-86 | |
| 155 | September 22 | | @ Cardinals | 7 – 4 | Thompson (7–6) | **Albers** (4–10) | Isringhausen (30) | | 46,237 | 68-87 | |
| 156 | September 23 | | @ Cardinals | 4 – 3 | Jiménez (3–0) | **Lidge** (5–3) | | | 46,169 | 68-88 | |
| 157 | September 25 | | @ Reds | 8 – 5 | **Paulino** (1-1) | Coutlangus (4–2) | **Lidge** (17) | | 13,261 | 69-88 | |
| 158 | September 26 | | @ Reds | 7 – 6 | **Sarfate** (1–0) | Burton (4–2) | **Qualls** (5) | | 13,138 | 70-88 | |
| 159 | September 27 | | @ Reds | 4 – 3 | **Borkowski** (5–3) | Majewski (0–4) | **Lidge** (18) | | 13,626 | 71-88 | |
| 160 | September 28 | | Braves | 7 – 2 | Reyes (2-2) | **Albers** (4–11) | | | 43,011 | 71-89 | |
| 161 | September 29 | | Braves | 3 – 2 | **Backe** (3–1) | Bennett (2–1) | **Lidge** (19) | | 43,624 | 72-89 | |
| 162 | September 30 | | Braves | 3 – 0 | **Paulino** (2–1) | Carlyle (8–7) | **Borkowski** (1) | | 43,823 | 73-89 | |

== Player statistics ==
Table legend
| League leader |
| League top ten |
| Team leader |

=== Batting ===
==== Starters by position ====
Note: Pos = Position; G = Games played; AB = At bats; H = Hits; Avg. = Batting average; HR = Home runs; RBI = Runs batted in

| Pos | Player | G | AB | H | Avg. | HR | RBI |
|---|---|---|---|---|---|---|---|
| C | Brad Ausmus | 117 | 349 | 82 | .235 | 3 | 25 |
| 1B | Lance Berkman | 153 | 561 | 156 | .278 | 34 | 102 |
| 2B | Craig Biggio | 141 | 517 | 130 | .251 | 10 | 50 |
| SS | Adam Everett | 66 | 220 | 51 | .232 | 2 | 15 |
| 3B | Morgan Ensberg | 85 | 224 | 52 | .232 | 8 | 31 |
| LF | Carlos Lee | 162 | 627 | 190 | .303 | 32 | 119 |
| CF | Hunter Pence | 108 | 456 | 147 | .322 | 17 | 69 |
| RF | Luke Scott | 132 | 369 | 94 | .255 | 18 | 64 |

==== Other batters ====
Note: G = Games played; AB = At bats; H = Hits; Avg. = Batting average; HR = Home runs; RBI = Runs batted in

| Player | G | AB | H | Avg. | HR | RBI |
|---|---|---|---|---|---|---|
| Mark Loretta | 133 | 460 | 132 | .287 | 4 | 41 |
| Chris Burke | 111 | 319 | 73 | .229 | 6 | 28 |
| Mike Lamb | 124 | 311 | 90 | .289 | 11 | 40 |
| Jason Lane | 68 | 169 | 30 | .178 | 8 | 27 |
| Ty Wigginton | 50 | 169 | 48 | .284 | 6 | 18 |
| Eric Bruntlett | 80 | 138 | 34 | .246 | 0 | 14 |
| Eric Munson | 50 | 132 | 31 | .235 | 4 | 15 |
| Orlando Palmeiro | 101 | 103 | 24 | .233 | 0 | 6 |
| Josh Anderson | 21 | 67 | 24 | .358 | 0 | 11 |
| Humberto Quintero | 29 | 53 | 12 | .226 | 0 | 1 |
| J.R. Towles | 14 | 40 | 15 | .375 | 1 | 12 |
| Cody Ransom | 19 | 35 | 8 | .229 | 1 | 3 |

=== Pitching ===
==== Starting pitchers ====
Note: G = Games pitched; IP = Innings pitched; W = Wins; L = Losses; ERA = Earned run average; SO = Strikeouts

| Player | G | IP | W | L | ERA | SO |
|---|---|---|---|---|---|---|
| Roy Oswalt | 33 | 212.0 | 14 | 7 | 3.18 | 154 |
| Woody Williams | 33 | 188.0 | 8 | 15 | 5.27 | 101 |
| Wandy Rodríguez | 31 | 182.2 | 9 | 13 | 4.58 | 158 |
| Chris Sampson | 24 | 121.2 | 7 | 8 | 4.59 | 51 |
| Jason Jennings | 19 | 99.0 | 2 | 9 | 6.45 | 71 |
| Brandon Backe | 5 | 28.2 | 3 | 1 | 3.77 | 11 |

==== Other pitchers ====
Note: G = Games pitched; IP = Innings pitched; W = Wins; L = Losses; ERA = Earned run average; SO = Strikeouts

| Player | G | IP | W | L | ERA | SO |
|---|---|---|---|---|---|---|
| Matt Albers | 31 | 110.2 | 4 | 11 | 5.86 | 71 |
| Juan Gutiérrez | 7 | 21.1 | 1 | 1 | 5.91 | 16 |
| Felipe Paulino | 5 | 19.0 | 2 | 1 | 7.11 | 11 |
| Troy Patton | 3 | 12.2 | 0 | 2 | 3.55 | 8 |

==== Relief pitchers ====
Note: G = Games pitched; W = Wins; L = Losses; SV = Saves; ERA = Earned run average; SO = Strikeouts

| Player | G | W | L | SV | ERA | SO |
|---|---|---|---|---|---|---|
| Brad Lidge | 66 | 5 | 3 | 19 | 3.36 | 88 |
| Chad Qualls | 79 | 6 | 5 | 5 | 3.05 | 78 |
| Trever Miller | 76 | 0 | 0 | 1 | 4.86 | 40 |
| Dave Borkowski | 64 | 5 | 3 | 1 | 5.15 | 63 |
| Dan Wheeler | 45 | 1 | 4 | 11 | 5.07 | 56 |
| Brian Moehler | 42 | 1 | 4 | 1 | 4.07 | 36 |
| Mark McLemore | 29 | 3 | 0 | 0 | 3.86 | 35 |
| Rick White | 23 | 1 | 0 | 0 | 7.67 | 15 |
| Stephen Randolph | 14 | 0 | 1 | 0 | 12.15 | 22 |
| Dennis Sarfate | 7 | 1 | 0 | 0 | 1.08 | 14 |
| Travis Driskill | 2 | 0 | 1 | 0 | 4.50 | 4 |

== Awards and achievements ==
=== Grand slams ===
Jeff Bagwell's number 5 was retired by the Houston Astros in August 26, 2007.

| No. | Date | Astros batter | Venue | Inning | Pitcher | Opposing team | Box |
|---|---|---|---|---|---|---|---|
| 1 | April 13 | Carlos Lee (Note: One of three home runs) | Citizens Bank Park | 3 (Note: Tied score or took lead) | Brett Myers | Philadelphia Phillies | |
| 2 | April 20 | Craig Biggio | Miller Park | 9 | Greg Aquino | Milwaukee Brewers | |
| 3 | May 5 | Hunter Pence (Note: 1st MLB home run) | Busch Stadium | 8 | Dennis Dove | St. Louis Cardinals | |
| 4 | June 17 | Mike Lamb | Minute Maid Park | 1 | Jarrod Washburn | Seattle Mariners | |
| 5 | June 28 | Carlos Lee | Minute Maid Park | 11 (Note: Walk-off) | Brian Fuentes | Colorado Rockies | |
| 6 | July 24 | Craig Biggio | Minute Maid Park | 6 | Rudy Seánez | Los Angeles Dodgers | |
| 7 | August 2 | Mike Lamb (Note: Pinch hitter) | Turner Field | 8 | Rafael Soriano | Atlanta Braves | |

=== Career milestones ===
- Craig Biggio: 3,000 hit club (June 28)

=== Career honors ===
Career honors received in 2007
| Honor / mention received | Individual | Role | Uni. | Start | Finish | ASG | Bio. / games | Summ. |
|---|---|---|---|---|---|---|---|---|
| All-Time Gold Glove Team | Joe Morgan (Note: Played two separate stints for the Colts .45s/Astros, first from 1963–1971, and again in 1980.) | Second baseman | 18 (Note: Primary uniform number. Also wore numbers 12 (1963), 35 (1964), and 8 (1980) while with Houston.) | 1963 | 1980 | 2 | 1,032 games | |
| Houston Astros uniform number retired | Jeff Bagwell | First baseman | 5 | 1991 | 2005 | 4 | 2,150 games | |

=== Annual awards ===
2007 Houston Astros award winners
| Name of award | | Recipient | Ref. |
|---|---|---|---|
| Baseball Digest Rookie All-Star | Outfielder | Hunter Pence | |
| Darryl Kile Good Guy Award | | Woody Williams | |
| Fred Hartman Award for Long and Meritorious Service to Baseball | | Jackie Moore | |
| Heart & Hustle Award | | Craig Biggio | |
| Houston-Area Major League Player of the Year | BOS | Josh Beckett | |
| Houston Astros | Most Valuable Player (MVP) | Carlos Lee | |
| Houston Astros | Pitcher of the Year | Roy Oswalt | |
| Houston Astros | Rookie of the Year | Hunter Pence | |
| MLB All-Star Game | Reserve outfielder | Carlos Lee | |
| MLB All-Star Game | Reserve pitcher | Roy Oswalt | |
| MLB.com's This Year in Baseball Best Moment | 3,000th hit | Craig Biggio | |
| National League (NL) Player of the Week | May 20 | Hunter Pence | |
| National League (NL) Player of the Week | July 1 | Craig Biggio | |
| National League (NL) Rookie of the Month | May | Hunter Pence | |
| Roberto Clemente Award | | Craig Biggio | |
| Silver Slugger Award | Outfielder | Carlos Lee | |
| Topps All-Star Rookie Team | Outfielder | Hunter Pence | |

Other awards results

| Name of award | Voting recipient(s) (team) | Ref. |
|---|---|---|
| NL Most Valuable Player | 1st—Rollins (PHI) • 19th—C. Lee (HOU) | |
| NL Rookie of the Year | 1st—Braun (MIL) • 3rd—Pence (HOU) | |

== Minor league system ==
| Level | Team | League | Manager |
|---|---|---|---|
| AAA | Round Rock Express | Pacific Coast League | Jackie Moore |
| AA | Corpus Christi Hooks | Texas League | Dave Clark |
| A | Salem Avalanche | Carolina League | Jim Pankovits |
| A | Lexington Legends | South Atlantic League | Gregg Langbehn |
| A-Short Season | Tri-City ValleyCats | New York–Penn League | Pete Rancont |
| Rookie | Greeneville Astros | Appalachian League | Rodney Linares |

Awards

- Houston Astros Minor League Player of the Year: Troy Patton

== See also ==
- Career grand slam leaders
- List of Major League Baseball career doubles leaders
- List of Major League Baseball career extra base hits leaders
- List of Major League Baseball career hits leaders
- List of Major League Baseball players who spent their entire career with one franchise
- List of Major League Baseball retired numbers
