= Juan Gutiérrez (baseball) =

Venezuelan baseball player (born 1983)

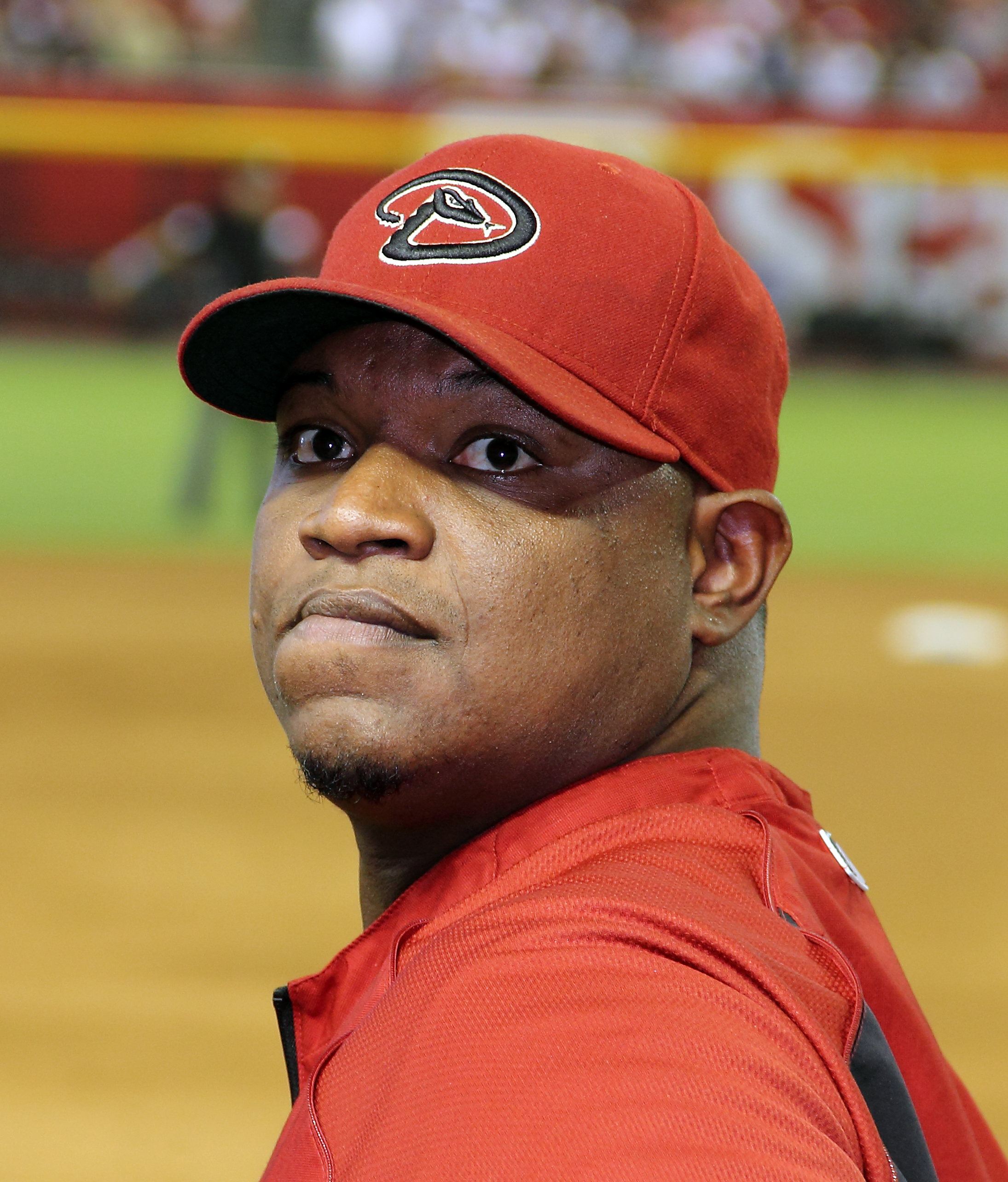
- Gutiérrez with the Arizona Diamondbacks
- Pitcher
- Born: July 14, 1983 (age 43); Puerto la Cruz, Venezuela
- Batted: Right Threw: Right

MLB debut
- August 19, 2007, for the Houston Astros

Last MLB appearance
- September 26, 2014, for the San Francisco Giants

MLB statistics
- Win–loss record: 7–17
- Earned run average: 4.49
- Strikeouts: 241
- Stats at Baseball Reference

Teams
- Houston Astros (2007); Arizona Diamondbacks (2009–2011); Kansas City Royals (2013); Los Angeles Angels of Anaheim (2013); San Francisco Giants (2014)

Juan Carlos Gutiérrez Acosta (born July 14, 1983) is a Venezuelan former professional baseball pitcher. He played in Major League Baseball (MLB) for the Houston Astros, Arizona Diamondbacks, Kansas City Royals, Los Angeles Angels of Anaheim, and San Francisco Giants.

== Career ==
=== Houston Astros ===
Gutiérrez was signed as an undrafted free agent by the Houston Astros on December 14, 2000. He played for Venezuelan Summer League in 2001 and 2002 before playing for the rookie-level Martinsville Astros in 2003 and the rookie-level Greeneville Astros in 2004. Gutiérrez had operated mainly as a starter in the minor leagues. In the 2006 Double-A Texas League, Gutiérrez helped lead the Corpus Christi Hooks (Houston) to their lone Texas League championship.

On August 17, 2007, Gutiérrez was promoted to the major leagues for the first time after Stephen Randolph was placed on the disabled list. On August 23, Gutiérrez made his first career start against the Washington Nationals, filling in for injured starting pitcher Roy Oswalt. He was sent back down to Round Rock on August 25 to following the promotion of left-handed pitcher Troy Patton. In seven appearances (three starts) for Houston during his rookie campaign, Gutiérrez logged a 1–1 record and 5.91 ERA with 16 strikeouts across 21 1/3 innings pitched.

=== Arizona Diamondbacks ===
On December 14, 2007, Gutiérrez was traded in a three-player deal which included pitcher Chad Qualls, infielder Chris Burke to the Arizona Diamondbacks in exchange for José Valverde. He spent the 2008 season with the Triple-A Tucson Sidewinders, struggling to a 5–11 record and 6.09 ERA with 87 strikeouts across 116 2/3 innings pitched.

Gutiérrez had a brief stint as the Diamondbacks' closer in 2009 after Qualls was injured. In 65 appearances for the team, he posted a 4–3 record and 4.06 ERA with 66 strikeouts and nine saves over 71 innings of work. Gutiérrez made 58 relief outings for Arizona during the 2010 campaign, registering an 0–6 record and 5.08 ERA with 47 strikeouts and 15 saves across 56 2/3 innings pitched.

Gutiérrez pitched in 20 games for the Diamondbacks in 2011, recording a 5.40 ERA with 23 strikeouts across 18 1/3 innings pitched. In September, Gutiérrez underwent Tommy John surgery, ruling him out for the remainder of the year and likely the majority of the 2012 season. Gutiérrez was released by Arizona on October 13, 2011.

=== Kansas City Royals ===
On December 13, 2011, Gutiérrez signed a minor league contract with the Kansas City Royals. He made 19 appearances (four starts) split between the rookie-level Arizona League Royals, Double-A Northwest Arkansas Naturals, and Triple-A Omaha Storm Chasers in 2012, pitching to an aggregate 0–2 record and 10.45 ERA with 18 strikeouts and three saves across 20 2/3 innings pitched.

On October 18, 2012, Gutiérrez re-signed with the Royals organization on a new minor league contract. On November 20, the Royals added him to their 40-man roster. On July 14, 2013, Gutiérrez was designated for assignment to make room for Wade Davis on the roster, who was reinstated from the paternity leave list. In 25 appearances for the Royals in 2013, he went 0–1 with a 3.38 ERA, striking out 17 in 29 1/3 innings.

=== Los Angeles Angels ===
On July 24, 2013, Gutiérrez was claimed off waivers by the Los Angeles Angels of Anaheim. In 28 relief appearances for the Angels, he compiled a 1–4 record and 5.19 ERA with 28 strikeouts over 26 innings of work. Gutiérrez was designated for assignment on November 27, and non–tendered on December 2, making him a free agent.

=== San Francisco Giants ===
On January 6, 2014, Gutiérrez signed a minor league contract with the San Francisco Giants. On March 29, he was added to the Giants' Opening Day roster after winning a spot in the team's bullpen. In 61 appearances for San Francisco, Gutiérrez logged a 1–2 record and 3.96 ERA with 44 strikeouts across 63 2/3 innings pitched. He was designated for assignment by the Giants on November 20, and elected free agency on November 26.

On December 22, 2014, the Giants re-signed Gutiérrez to a new minor league contract. In 14 appearances for the Triple-A Sacramento River Cats, he posted an 0–1 record and 4.39 ERA with 50 strikeouts and five saves in 61 innings. On June 1, 2015, Gutiérrez opted out of his contract with the Giants and became a free agent.

=== Philadelphia Phillies ===
On June 8, 2015, Gutiérrez signed a minor league contract with the Philadelphia Phillies. On August 3, Gutiérrez was released by the Phillies organization.

=== Washington Nationals ===
On August 11, 2015, Gutiérrez signed a minor league contract with the Washington Nationals. In nine appearances for the Triple-A Syracuse Chiefs, he recorded a 5.79 ERA with eight strikeouts and two saves across 9 1/3 innings. Gutiérrez elected free agency following the season on November 6.

On February 22, 2016, Gutiérrez re-signed with the Nationals on a new minor league contract. In 18 appearances for Syracuse, he recorded a 5.21 ERA with 17 strikeouts; Gutiérrez also compiled a 1.23 ERA with 11 strikeouts and two saves in seven outings for the Double-A Harrisburg Senators. On June 27, Gutiérrez was released by the Nationals organization.

=== Leones de Yucatán ===
On July 13, 2016, Gutiérrez signed with the Leones de Yucatán of the Mexican League. In 12 appearances for Yucatán, he compiled a 1–0 record and 2.77 ERA with 13 strikeouts and two saves over 13 innings of work. On February 9, 2017, Gutiérrez was released by the Leones.

=== Saraperos de Saltillo ===
On May 2, 2017, Gutiérrez signed with the Saraperos de Saltillo of the Mexican League. In six appearances for Saltillo, he struggled to an 0–1 record and 7.36 ERA with six strikeouts and two saves across 7 1/3 innings pitched. Gutiérrez was released by the Saraperos on May 22.

== See also ==
- List of Major League Baseball players from Venezuela
