= Mark McLemore (pitcher) =

American baseball player (born 1980)

- Relief pitcher
- Born: October 9, 1980 (age 45); Sacramento, California, U.S.
- Batted: Left Threw: Left

MLB debut
- May 24, 2007, for the Houston Astros

Last MLB appearance
- September 30, 2007, for the Houston Astros

MLB statistics
- Win–loss record: 3–0
- Earned run average: 3.86
- Strikeouts: 35
- Stats at Baseball Reference

Teams
- Houston Astros (2007)

Mark Steven McLemore (born October 9, 1980) is an American former Major League Baseball (MLB) pitcher who played for the Houston Astros in 2007.

McLemore graduated from Del Oro High School, and attended Oregon State University. In 2001, he played collegiate summer baseball with the Bourne Braves of the Cape Cod Baseball League.

He was selected by the Astros in the 4th round of the 2002 Major League Baseball draft. McLemore made his big league debut for Houston on May 24, 2007, pitching one inning of relief against the Arizona Diamondbacks.

In 2010, he was signed by Minnesota Twins to a minor league contract, then was later invited to Spring Training with the Chico Outlaws of the Golden Baseball League. He last played for the Florida Marlins organization in 2011.
