= Dave Borkowski =

American baseball player

- Pitcher
- Batted: Right Threw: Right

MLB debut
- July 17, 1999, for the Detroit Tigers

Last MLB appearance
- September 28, 2008, for the Houston Astros

MLB statistics
- Win–loss record: 13–20
- Earned run average: 5.87
- Strikeouts: 265
- Stats at Baseball Reference

Teams
- Detroit Tigers (1999–2001); Baltimore Orioles (2004); Houston Astros (2006–2008)

David Richard Borkowski is an American former professional baseball relief pitcher He began his Major League Baseball (MLB) career in 1999 with the Detroit Tigers, and briefly appeared with the Baltimore Orioles in 2004. From 2006 to 2008, he played for the Houston Astros. Borkowski spent part of the 2009 season in the Philadelphia Phillies organization but did not get the call.

In 2018, he became the pitching coach for the Tulsa Drillers. He was promoted to pitching coach for the Oklahoma City Dodgers in 2022. In 2025, he became the bullpen coach for the Round Rock Express.
