= J. R. Towles =

American baseball player (born 1984)

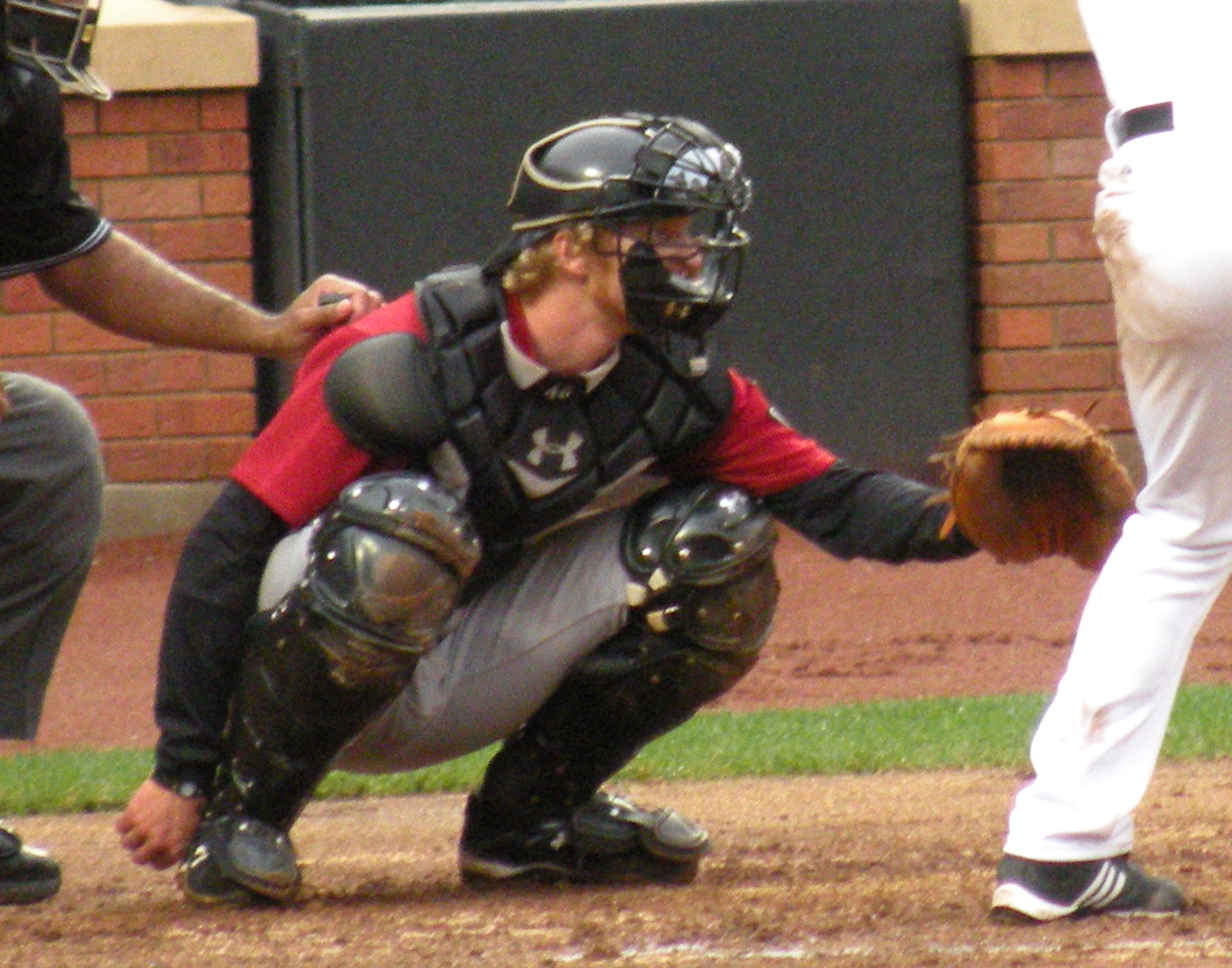
- Towles with the Houston Astros
- Catcher
- Born: February 11, 1984 (age 42); Crosby, Texas, U.S.
- Batted: Right Threw: Right

MLB debut
- September 5, 2007, for the Houston Astros

Last MLB appearance
- September 27, 2011, for the Houston Astros

MLB statistics
- Batting average: .187
- Home runs: 11
- Runs batted in: 50
- Stats at Baseball Reference

Teams
- Houston Astros (2007–2011)

Justin Richard Towles (born February 11, 1984) is an American former professional baseball catcher. He played in Major League Baseball (MLB) for the Houston Astros from 2007 to 2011.

== Career ==
=== Draft ===
The Oakland Athletics originally drafted him in the 32nd round (968th overall) and in the 23rd round (692nd overall) in the 2002 and 2003 Major League Baseball drafts, respectively. He did not sign with them either times. He signed with the Houston Astros when they drafted him in the 20th round (604th overall) in the 2004 draft.

=== Houston Astros ===
In 2004 after being signed, Towles played at the rookie level for the Greeneville Astros. He played in just 39 games and batted .243 with no home runs. In 2005 and in 2006, he played for the Single-A Lexington Legends. He batted .345 with 5 home runs in 45 games in 2005 and in 2006, batted .312 with 12 home runs in 81 games. He was a South Atlantic League Mid-Season All-Star in 2006 and was a Baseball America Low A All-Star.

Towles worked his way up the minor leagues in 2007. He began the year with the Single-A Salem Avalanche, then the Double-A Corpus Christi Hooks, and by the end of the minor league season, was with the Triple-A Round Rock Express. He played a total of 100 games in the minor leagues and batted .287 with 11 home runs. He also was a selection for the All-Star Futures Game at AT&T Park in San Francisco.

Towles had his contract purchased by the major league club on September 4, 2007. He made his major league debut on September 5, 2007, against the Milwaukee Brewers. He faced relief pitcher Matt Wise as a pinch hitter and flied out to left fielder Mel Stocker. On September 20, 2007, Towles got 8 RBI in a game beating the club record of 7 RBI. In the same game, the Astros got a combined 23 hits in their 18-1 win against the St. Louis Cardinals. Towles also hit his first career home run that day. The pitcher who gave up that home run was actually infielder Aaron Miles.

Towles was expected to be the starting catcher starting in 2008 with the club signing Brad Ausmus to a one-year contract to serve as a back-up catcher and mentor to the young Towles on October 30, 2007.

On June 5, 2008, Towles was optioned to Triple-A Round Rock after hitting .145 over 42 games for the Astros. He had 17 hits in 117 at-bats, including four homers, and 14 RBIs. Towles was not surprised about this move though and took it very well. Towles thought of it as a time to get some confidence back. Cooper said it wasn't his catching or game calling, it was his offense. Ausmus became the primary catcher.

He competed with Humberto Quintero and Lou Palmisano for the starting or back-up job in spring training in 2009, but instead began the season in Round Rock when the team had signed Iván Rodríguez on March 16. After Quintero was designated to the 15 Day Disabled List, Towles was called up to the Astros to serve as back-up catcher for Rodriguez.

Towles hit .191 (9-for-47) with one homer and eight RBIs in 17 games with the Astros. He was the Opening Day starter the following year and wound up starting 13 of the team's first 26 games, splitting time with Quintero. On May 5, 2010, he was optioned to Double-A Corpus Christi.

=== Minnesota Twins ===
On December 15, 2011, Towles signed a minor league contract with the Minnesota Twins. He also received an invitation to spring training. He spent the entire 2012 season in the minor leagues, playing in 52 games with the Rochester Red Wings, the Twins Triple-A affiliate. Towles batted .214 in 168 plate appearances.

=== St. Louis Cardinals ===
On December 19, 2012, Towles agreed to a minor league contract with the St. Louis Cardinals. The deal included an invitation as a non-roster player to spring training with the club. He played in 19 games for the Memphis Redbirds, hitting .237 before he was released on May 24.

=== Los Angeles Dodgers ===
He subsequently signed a minor league contract with the Los Angeles Dodgers on May 29, 2013. He reported to the AAA Albuquerque Isotopes but only played in 4 games for them before he was shut down with an injury.

=== Bridgeport Bluefish ===
On March 14, 2014, Towles signed with the Bridgeport Bluefish of the Atlantic League of Professional Baseball. In 67 games he hit .292/.411/.519 with 11 home runs and 37 RBIs.

=== Texas Rangers ===
Towles signed a minor league deal with the Texas Rangers on August 25, 2014. He became a free agent after the 2014 season.
