= Cody Ransom =

American baseball player (born 1976)

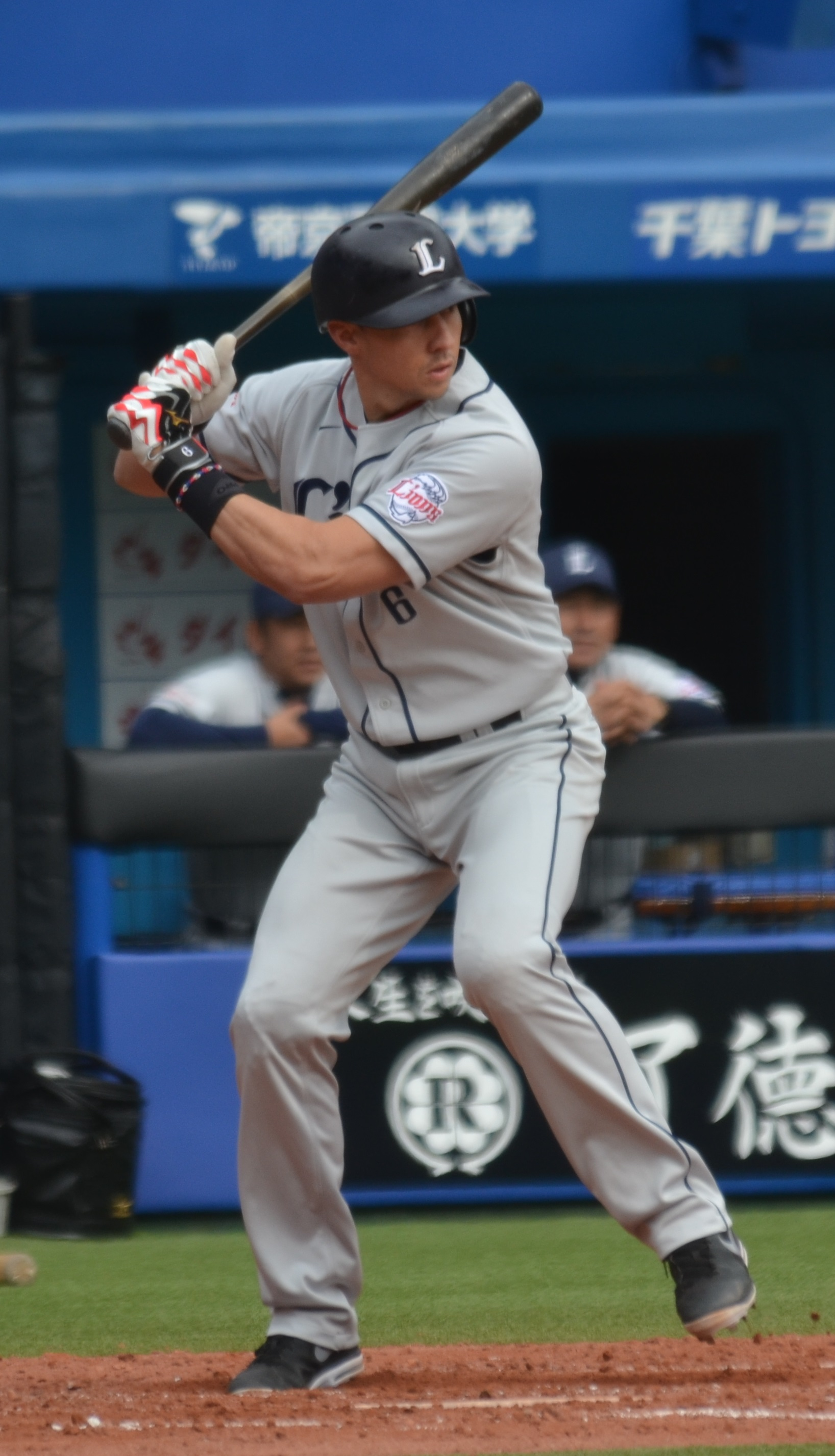
- Ransom with the Saitama Seibu Lions in 2014
- Infielder / Infield coordinator
- Born: February 17, 1976 (age 50); Mesa, Arizona, U.S.
- Batted: Right Threw: Right

Professional debut
- MLB: September 5, 2001, for the San Francisco Giants
- NPB: March 28, 2014, for the Saitama Seibu Lions

Last appearance
- MLB: August 31, 2013, for the Chicago Cubs
- NPB: July 16, 2014, for the Saitama Seibu Lions

MLB statistics
- Batting average: .213
- Home runs: 30
- Runs batted in: 105

NPB statistics
- Batting average: .212
- Home runs: 2
- Runs batted in: 12
- Stats at Baseball Reference

Teams
- As player: San Francisco Giants (2001–2004); Houston Astros (2007); New York Yankees (2008–2009); Philadelphia Phillies (2010); Arizona Diamondbacks (2011–2012); Milwaukee Brewers (2012); Arizona Diamondbacks (2012); San Diego Padres (2013); Chicago Cubs (2013); Saitama Seibu Lions (2014); As coach: Washington Nationals (2023)

Bryan Cody Ransom (born February 17, 1976) is an American former professional baseball utility infielder. He played in Major League Baseball (MLB) for the San Francisco Giants, Houston Astros, New York Yankees, Philadelphia Phillies, Arizona Diamondbacks, Milwaukee Brewers, San Diego Padres, and Chicago Cubs. He also played in Nippon Professional Baseball (NPB) for the Saitama Seibu Lions.

== Early life and high school ==
Ransom was raised as a Yankees fan in Mesa, Arizona. He was a batboy for the Milwaukee Brewers during spring training on year.

He attended Chandler High School in Chandler, Arizona. He was selected by the Cleveland Indians in the 43rd round (1,202nd overall) in the 1995 Major League Baseball draft but did not sign.

== College career ==
Ransom attended South Mountain Community College. On March 29, 1996, he survived a fatal van accident when his college baseball team's van blew a tire on a team trip to Tucson, causing the van to roll over. Two of Ransom's teammates died.

After spending two years at South Mountain, Ransom transferred to Mesa State College for the 1997 season, helping the Mavericks to the NCAA Division II regional. He transferred to Grand Canyon University for the 1998 season, and was a key member of an Antelopes squad that won the Western Athletic Conference Northern Division. Ransom started every game at shortstop, hitting .330 with eight home runs and 48 RBIs while leading the team with 20 doubles.

== Professional career ==
=== San Francisco Giants ===
Ransom was drafted again in 1998, this time by the San Francisco Giants in the ninth round (278th overall). That year, he spent his first professional season with the Single-A Salem-Keizer Volcanoes, who won the Northwest League championship in 1998. Ransom started the 1999 season in High-A with the Bakersfield Blaze of the California League. After hitting .275 with 11 home runs in 356 at-bats, he was promoted to Double-A. He struggled in 2000, hitting only .200 with seven home runs and 108 strikeouts over a full season with the Shreveport Captains of the Texas League.

Ransom spent the 2001 season with the Fresno Grizzlies in Triple-A, hitting .241 with 23 home runs and 17 stolen bases in 134 games. That year, he appeared in the All-Star Futures Game. He was then called up to the majors and made his debut on September 5, 2001, against the Arizona Diamondbacks. He again spent the 2002 season in Triple-A, hitting .207 with 14 home runs and 46 RBI before getting called up in September. On September 29, Ransom collected his first two hits and first RBI in a game against the Houston Astros.

He had multiple stints with the Giants in 2003. Ransom was called up in May when Ray Durham went on the disabled list with a sprained ankle. He had one at-bat as a pinch hitter before returning to the minors. He was up for nine games in August before being demoted again. During this time, he hit his first major league home run off Philadelphia Phillies pitcher Vicente Padilla. The Giants then recalled Ransom when rosters expanded in September.

Ransom opened the 2004 season on the Giants' opening day roster, but was sent back down on April 23. After his demotion, Ransom hit .309 with 10 home runs and 21 RBI in 36 games and homered in four straight games, and was promoted in early June. He hit .286 in just 64 plate appearances over the next four months. On October 2, he committed a costly error in the ninth inning against the Los Angeles Dodgers that set up Steve Finley's walk-off grand slam to win the division. Following the 2004 season, he was granted free agency by the Giants.

=== Chicago Cubs ===
Ransom signed a minor league contract with the Chicago Cubs on January 20, 2005.

=== Texas Rangers ===
On March 30, 2005, Ransom was acquired by the Texas Rangers in exchange for cash considerations. He held a .261 batting average with five home runs in 24 games for the Triple-A Oklahoma Redhawks. Ransom was released by the Rangers organization on May 25.

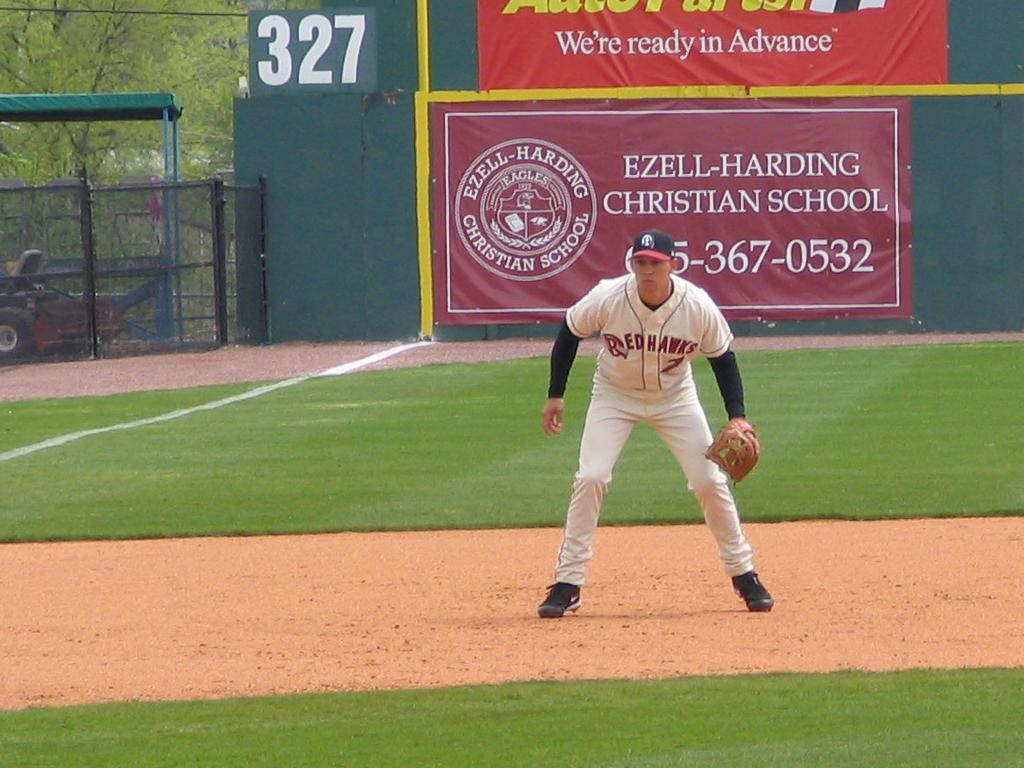
Ransom with the Oklahoma RedHawks in 2005.

=== Chicago Cubs (second stint) ===
Following his release, Ransom re-signed with the Chicago Cubs two days later. He played with the Triple-A Iowa Cubs for the rest of the season.

=== Seattle Mariners ===
Ransom signed with the Seattle Mariners on January 27, 2006, with an invitation to Spring Training. He played in 19 games during Spring Training in which he batted .219 with no home runs. He was reassigned to minor league camp at the end of March.

=== Houston Astros ===
Ransom was acquired by the Houston Astros in exchange for cash considerations on March 30, 2006. He played for the Triple-A Round Rock Express that year, batting .247 with 21 home runs in 122 games.

Ransom re-signed with the organization for the 2007 season. He played for the Express until the end of the minor league season. Ransom batted .263 in 134 games and led the Express in home runs (28) and RBI (90). He was also second on the team in hits (131). His good performance earned him a call up when rosters expanded in September.

On September 16, Ransom hit a home run off Pittsburgh Pirates starter Paul Maholm. It was Ransom's first home run in the major leagues since 2004. On September 20, Ransom collected three hits and two walks in an 18–1 win over the St. Louis Cardinals. He was the last Astro to score five runs in a game until George Springer did it in 2014.

=== New York Yankees ===
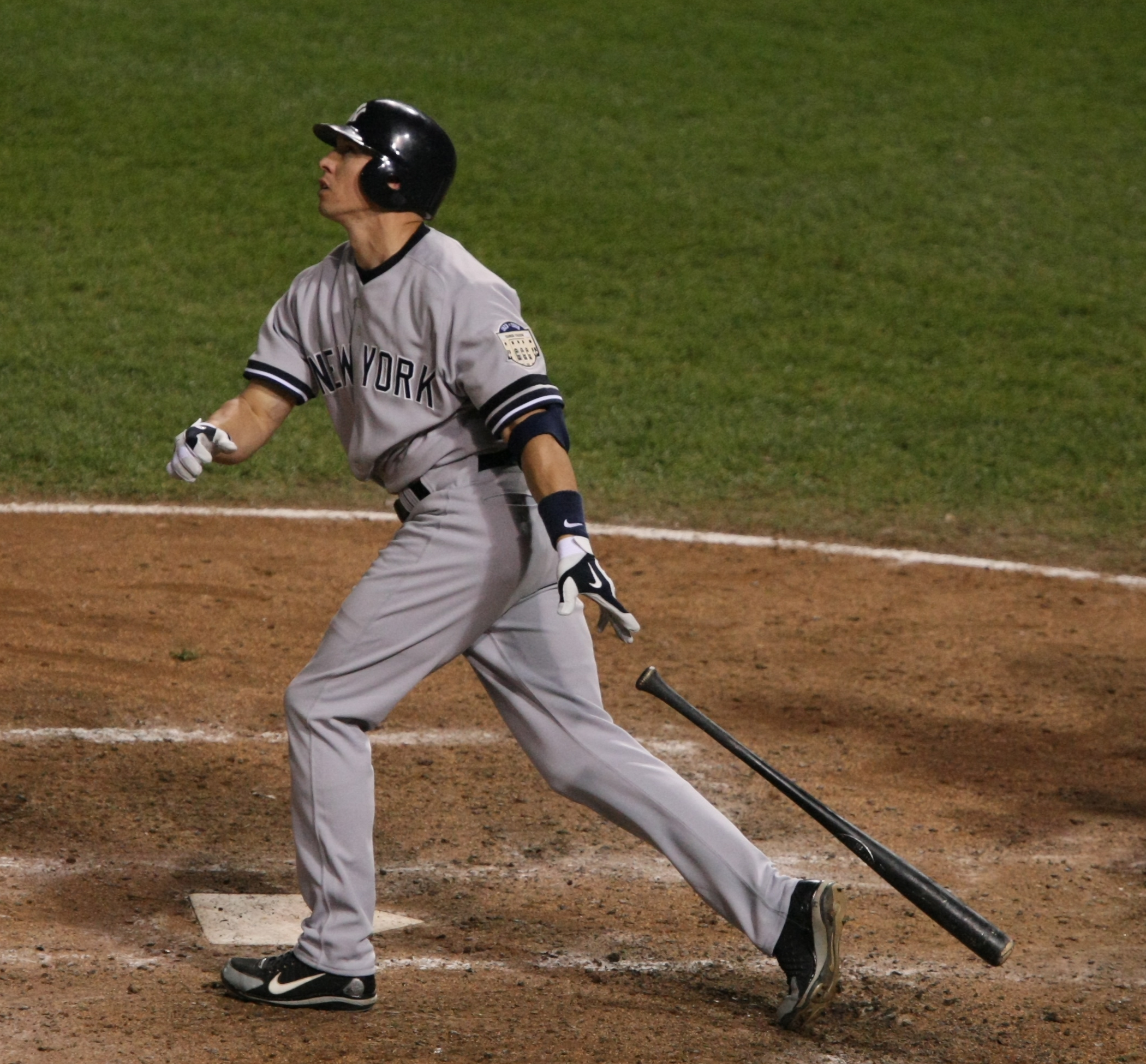
Cody Ransom with Yankees

Ransom signed a minor league contract with the New York Yankees before the 2008 season. He played for the Scranton/Wilkes-Barre Yankees in Triple-A, hitting .255 with 22 home runs and 71 RBI in 116 games. He was added to the International League All-Star team when teammate Justin Christian was promoted. Ransom was called up to the Yankees on August 15. On August 17, he homered in both his first at-bats with the Yankees. He homered again in his second at-bats five days later, the first hitter in Yankees history to do so.

On September 21, Ransom made the last putout in Yankee Stadium history. Baltimore Orioles second baseman Brian Roberts hit a slow ground ball down the first baseline that Ransom fielded, then stepped on first for the deciding out in a 7–3 Yankees win. On September 26, Ransom had his first multi-home run game against the Boston Red Sox. Both home runs came on the first pitch of the at-bat. Ransom was one of only three Yankees to hit a home run while serving as a pinch hitter.

Ransom started the 2009 season as the Yankees' starting third baseman due to the hip surgery recovery of Alex Rodriguez; however, Ransom too was put on the disabled list on April 25 after an injury to his right quadriceps and missed two months. After hitting .190 on the season, he was designated for assignment on August 5, then outrighted to Triple-A.

=== Philadelphia Phillies ===
Ransom signed a minor league contract with the Philadelphia Phillies in December 2009. He started at third base in the Triple-A All-Star Game. On July 3, 2010, the Phillies called him up to the majors after injuries to Chase Utley and Plácido Polanco. Ransom played in 22 games, making starts at third, second and first base. He had eight hits and two home runs in 42 at-bats. One of them was a game-tying home run with two outs in the bottom of the ninth inning against the Cincinnati Reds on July 7. Ransom was designated for assignment on August 5, the outrighted to Triple-A.

=== Arizona Diamondbacks ===
On January 19, 2011, Ransom signed a minor league contract with the Arizona Diamondbacks. During his time with the Reno Aces, he hit .331 with 26 home runs and 89 RBI, winning PCL Player of the Week after batting .462 with four homes and 13 RBI during the week of June 20. Ransom was the starting shortstop for the Pacific Coast League team in the Triple-A All-Star Game. On July 21, Ransom was called up to replace an injured Stephen Drew. He played in 12 total games at shortstop and third base before being designated for assignment and outrighted to the minors at the end of August.

The Diamondbacks re-signed Ransom to a minor league contract on December 11. He again started the year in Reno, but was called up on April 18 when Chris Young went on the disabled list. He made 13 starts at third base, hitting .269, before the Diamondbacks designated Ransom for assignment on May 21, 2012.

=== Milwaukee Brewers ===
On May 23, 2012, Ransom was claimed off waivers from the Arizona Diamondbacks by the Milwaukee Brewers. On July 13, Ransom hit his first career grand slam against the Pittsburgh Pirates, lifting the Brewers to victory 10–7. Ransom made 33 starts at shortstop, nine at third base, and two at second for the Brewers, hitting .196 with six home runs in 168 total at-bats.

=== Arizona Diamondbacks (second stint) ===
On August 31, 2012, the Arizona Diamondbacks claimed Ransom off waivers from the Milwaukee Brewers. He played in nine games for Arizona in September, making starts at shortstop and third and picking up seven hits in 23 at-bats. On October 25, Ransom was removed from the 40-man roster and sent outright to the Triple-A Reno Aces.

=== San Diego Padres ===
On December 21, 2012, Ransom signed a minor league contract with the San Diego Padres. With injuries to Chase Headley and Logan Forsythe in spring training, Ransom made his third Opening Day roster and second Opening Day line-up starting at third base. He was designated for assignment on April 12, 2013.

=== Chicago Cubs (third stint) ===
Ransom was claimed off waivers by the Chicago Cubs on April 16, 2013. He hit .203 with nine home runs and 20 RBI through 57 games with the big league club. Ransom was designated for assignment on September 8 and released on September 16.

=== Seibu Lions ===
Ransom signed a contract with the Seibu Lions of Nippon Professional Baseball for the 2014 season.

=== Arizona Diamondbacks (third stint) ===
Returning from Japan, Ransom signed with the Diamondbacks for the 2015 season. He opened the season on the minor league disabled list and hit .210 with six home runs and 30 RBI in 63 games with the Reno Aces.

== Coaching career ==
In 2020, Ransom was hired by the Arizona Diamondbacks to serve as a coach with the AZL Diamondbacks of the Rookie-level Arizona League. He was named bench coach for the Visalia Rawhide of the Single-A California League in 2022. The Washington Nationals hired him to serve as the team's infield coordinator for the 2023 season.

== Personal life ==
Ransom is married to Ericka, and they have a daughter named Mackenzie and son named Jordan. His grandfather, Roy Ransom, was a Yankees farmhand in the 1930s.

A 2009 YouTube video of his 60-inch box jump in a training session went viral and has received almost 400,000 hits.
