= Stephen Randolph =

American baseball player (born 1974)

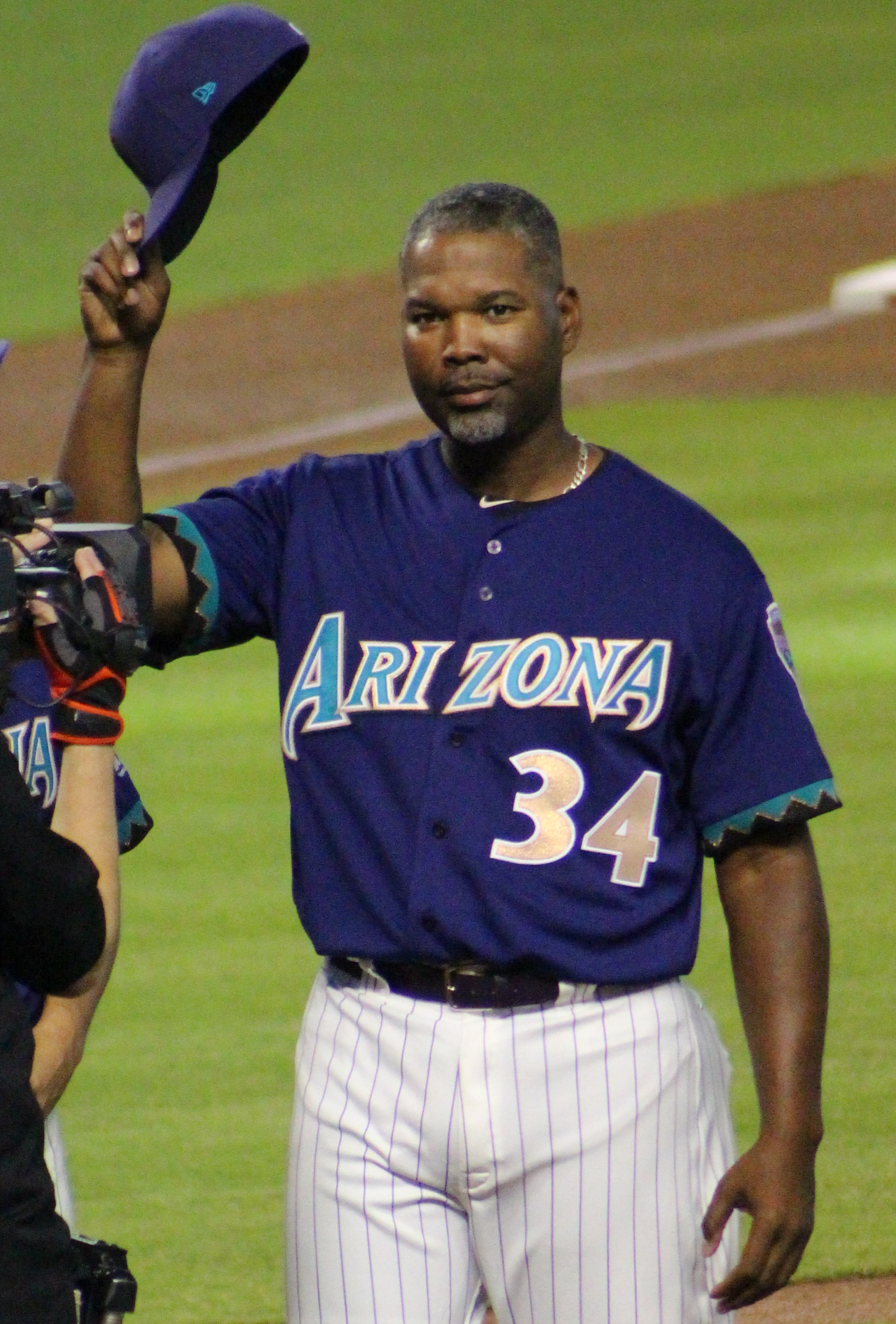
- Randolph at the 2017 Arizona Diamondbacks Alumni Game
- Pitcher
- Born: May 1, 1974 (age 52); Okinawa, Japan
- Batted: Left Threw: Left

Professional debut
- MLB: March 31, 2003, for the Arizona Diamondbacks
- NPB: July 25, 2009, for the Yokohama BayStars

Last appearance
- MLB: September 28, 2007, for the Houston Astros
- NPB: August 4, 2010, for the Yokohama BayStars

MLB statistics
- Win–loss record: 10–7
- Earned run average: 5.52
- Strikeouts: 134

NPB statistics
- Win–loss record: 7–11
- Earned run average: 3.39
- Strikeouts: 142
- Stats at Baseball Reference

Teams
- Arizona Diamondbacks (2003–2004); Houston Astros (2007); Yokohama BayStars (2009–2010)

Stephen LeCharles Randolph (born May 1, 1974) is an American former professional baseball left-handed pitcher. He played in Major League Baseball (MLB) for the Arizona Diamondbacks and Houston Astros, and in Nippon Professional Baseball (NPB) for the Yokohama BayStars.

== Career ==
Randolph was selected by the New York Yankees in the 18th round (506th overall) of the 1995 Major League Baseball draft out of the University of Texas, Austin. He spent three seasons in the Yankees farm system, never getting above the High-A level.

On December 15, 1997, Randolph was selected by the Arizona Diamondbacks in the minor league phase of the Rule 5 draft and joined the Diamondbacks' farm system, where he would remain through 2003, playing primarily with the Triple-A Tucson Sidewinders.

Randolph made his Major League debut on March 31, 2003 against the Los Angeles Dodgers, working 1/3 of an inning in relief. He became a regular contributor to the Arizona bullpen in both 2003 and 2004, pitching in 50 games in 2003 and 45 in 2004.

On January 10, 2005, Arizona traded Randolph to the Chicago Cubs in exchange for future considerations. However, the Cubs released him on March 30 at the end of spring training, and he spent the year with the Triple-A Fresno Grizzlies of the San Francisco Giants organization and the Triple-A New Orleans Zephyrs of the Washington Nationals organization. Randolph spent the 2006 campaign with the Triple-A Charlotte Knights in the Chicago White Sox organization.

On January 4, 2007, Randolph signed a minor league contract with the Houston Astros Randolph was called up to Houston from Triple-A Round Rock April 25 when reliever Rick White was placed on the disabled list (DL) with an oblique strain. He made only two appearances before he was designated for assignment on April 27 to make room for top outfield prospect Hunter Pence. Randolph was recalled from Round Rock June 19 when Brad Lidge went on the DL with an oblique strain, but was again designated for assignment June 28.

On December 13, 2007, Randolph was among 89 players named in the Mitchell Report on performance-enhancing drug use in baseball. On May 8, 2008, Randolph was traded by the Astros to the Philadelphia Phillies. He was assigned to the Phillies' Triple-A affiliate, the Lehigh Valley IronPigs and became a free agent at the end of the season. Randolph signed a minor league contract with the Los Angeles Dodgers on January 11, 2009 and was assigned to the Triple-A Albuquerque Isotopes.

On July 3, 2009, the Dodgers traded Randolph to the Kansas City Royals in exchange for future considerations. In two starts for the Triple-A Omaha Storm Chasers, he struggled to a 10.13 ERA with seven strikeouts over eight innings pitched.

On July 25, 2009, Randolph was sold to the Yokohama BayStars of Nippon Professional Baseball.

== See also ==
- List of Major League Baseball players named in the Mitchell Report
