= Troy Patton =

American baseball player (born 1985)

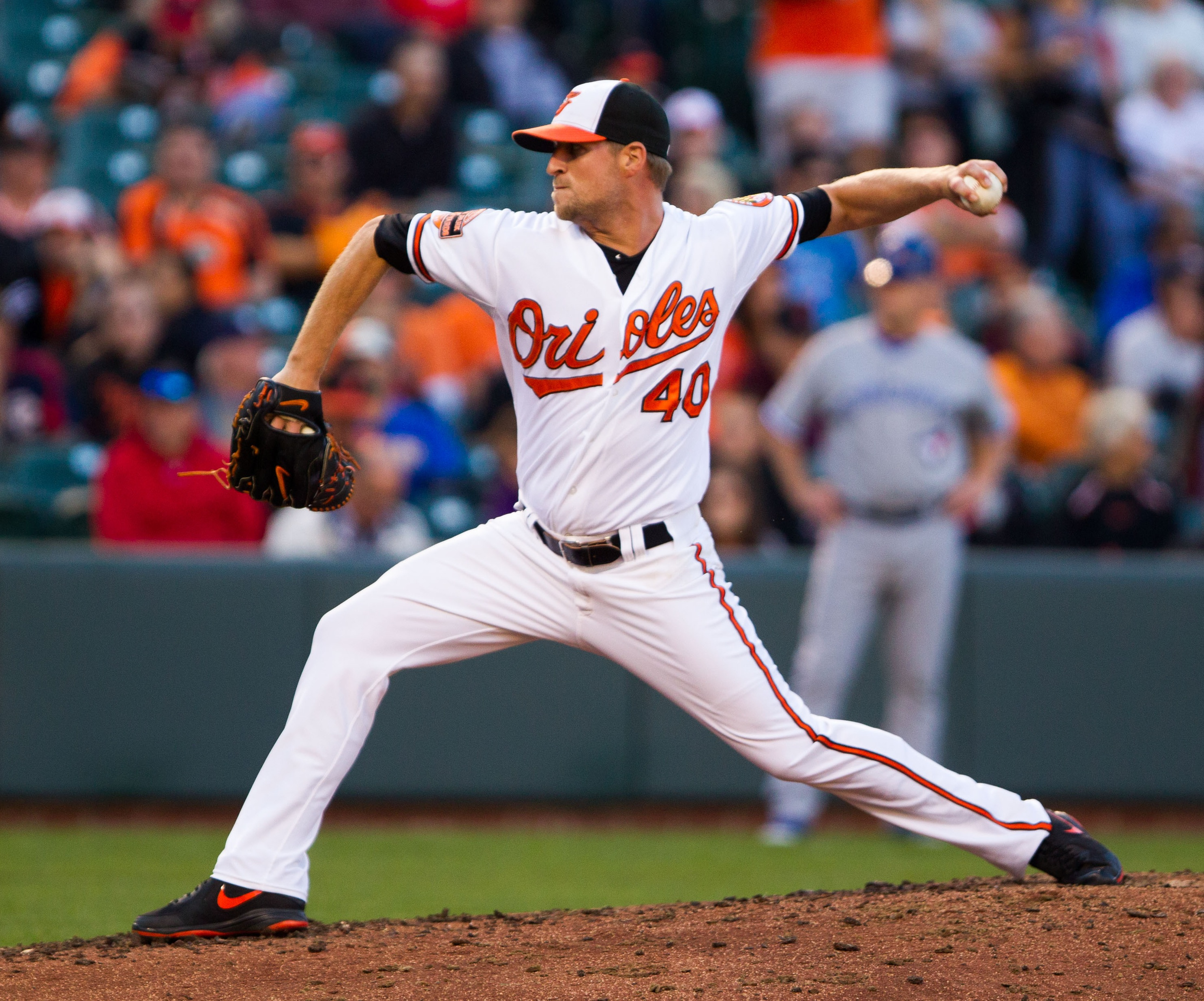
- Patton with the Baltimore Orioles
- Pitcher
- Born: September 3, 1985 (age 41); Spring, Texas, U.S.
- Batted: Switch Threw: Left

MLB debut
- August 25, 2007, for the Houston Astros

Last MLB appearance
- June 13, 2014, for the San Diego Padres

MLB statistics
- Win–loss record: 5–4
- Earned run average: 3.25
- Strikeouts: 135
- Stats at Baseball Reference

Teams
- Houston Astros (2007); Baltimore Orioles (2010–2014); San Diego Padres (2014)

Troy Jamieson Patton (born September 3, 1985) is an American former professional baseball pitcher. He played in Major League Baseball (MLB) for the Houston Astros, Baltimore Orioles and San Diego Padres. Patton attended Tomball High School in Tomball, Texas.

== Baseball career ==
=== Houston Astros ===
Patton was drafted in the ninth round by the Houston Astros in 2004. In 2007, Patton played in Minor League Baseball for the Corpus Christi Hooks and Round Rock Express. He made his MLB debut with the Houston Astros on August 25, 2007.

=== Baltimore Orioles ===
Patton was part of a trade package sent by the Astros to the Baltimore Orioles on December 12, 2007, in return for shortstop Miguel Tejada.

Patton spent the 2008 season on the disabled list after suffering a left labrum tear.

On September 22, 2010, Patton made his first career appearance for the Orioles, in a game against the Boston Red Sox. He pitched 0.2 inning, giving up no runs, one hit, one walk, while striking out David Ortiz to end the inning.

Patton was called up in May 2011 by the Orioles. He made 20 relief appearances, for 30 innings pitched. He posted an ERA of 3.00, with a record of 2–1, with two holds.

In the 2012 season, Patton made the team out of spring training and was used effectively out of the bullpen all year, mainly as a left handed specialist due to his sweeping side-arm pitching motion. Patton sprained his previously injured ankle while walking through a parking garage, and would go on the disabled list for approximately one month. He finished the season with a 1-0 record and a 2.43 ERA in 54 games pitched, while being an integral part of the Orioles bullpen, helping them to their first playoff appearance since the 1997 season.

On December 20, 2013, Patton was suspended for 25 games after testing positive for amphetamines.

=== San Diego Padres ===
On May 24, 2014, the Orioles traded Patton to the San Diego Padres in exchange for Nick Hundley and cash considerations. He was designated for assignment on September 2, 2014. Patton elected free agency in October 2014.

On November 5, 2014 he received an 80-game suspension for his third violation of MLB drug policy for amphetamine use.

=== Kansas City Royals ===
On April 4, 2015 Patton signed a minor league deal with the Kansas City Royals. He was assigned to the Triple-A Omaha Storm Chasers to begin the year. On July 4, Patton was activated by the Storm Chasers upon the completion of his 80-game suspension. He made 20 appearances for Omaha on the year, registering a 2.37 ERA with 25 strikeouts in 30 1/3 innings pitched. Patton elected free agency following the season on November 6.

=== Miami Marlins ===
On December 21, 2015, Patton signed a minor league contract with the Miami Marlins. On February 23, 2016, Patton was released by the Marlins.

== See also ==
- List of Major League Baseball players suspended for performance-enhancing drugs
