= 2007 Pittsburgh Pirates season =

2007 Pittsburgh Pirates
- League: National League
- Division: Central
- Ballpark: PNC Park
- City: Pittsburgh, Pennsylvania
- Record: 68–94 (.420)
- Divisional place: 6th
- Owners: Bob Nutting; Kevin McClatchy
- General managers: Dave Littlefield; Neal Huntington
- Managers: Jim Tracy
- Television: FSN Pittsburgh
- Radio: WPGB-FM (Steve Blass, Greg Brown, Lanny Frattare, Bob Walk, John Wehner)

The 2007 Pittsburgh Pirates season was the 126th season of the franchise; the 121st in the National League. This was their seventh season at PNC Park. The Pirates finished sixth and last in the National League Central with a record of 68–94.

== Overview ==
The Pirates began 2007 with a new majority owner, Bob Nutting, and the dreary fact that they could surpass the Philadelphia Phillies as owners of the longest consecutive losing seasons record in baseball, having last had a winning season in 1992. However, in spite of finishing 5th in the NL Central, the Pirates were hoping that their 2nd half momentum from 2006 would carry over into 2007.

In addition to NL batting champion Freddy Sanchez and slugger Jason Bay, the Bucs acquired Adam LaRoche from Atlanta in January, hoping to boost offensive power. In addition, they re-signed pitcher Shawn Chacón, acquired from the Yankees last summer, and signed Tony Armas Jr. to help bolster their starting rotation, led by Ian Snell and Tom Gorzelanny.

Just before the All Star game, team CEO Kevin McClatchy announced at the end of the season he would be stepping down from the position. He maintained that he would "remain as the active leader of the organization" to give the team ample time to find a successor and "ensure a smooth transition into the next chapter of Pirates history."

== Regular season ==
The Pirates' season started well, as they swept the Houston Astros in Houston for the first time since 1991, when the Astros played in the Astrodome. However, that initial success didn't carry for very long, as the Bucs proceeded to lose 11 of their next 13 games. The Pirates pulled out of their early slump to post a 12-12 record at the end of April. May, however, would to be quite tumultuous, as Tony Armas was sent to the bullpen for poor performance, Zach Duke struggled mightily, the bullpen blew several late leads, and closer Salomón Torres was stripped of his closer's duties, in favor of youngster Matt Capps after Torres blew a 2-run ninth-inning lead against the San Diego Padres on May 31.

After the All-Star Break, the Pirates started off by losing 7 games in a row, and 8 out of 9 overall. Paul "Big Poison" Waner's number 11 was retired in a pregame ceremony at PNC Park July 21, 2007, conducted in part by members of his family and Pirate greats Bill Mazeroski and Ralph Kiner.

=== Fans protest ===
Frustrated by the consistent losing, poor drafting, and the ownership's inability to retain players due to payroll constraints, fans led by Pittsburgh Business Executive Andrew Chomos organized a much-publicized walkout for June 30. There was also a pre-game protest rally outside the stadium, including the appearance and speaking of former Pirate Doc Ellis, who stated he has been "embarrassed to be called a Pirate over the last 15 years". Despite the best efforts by the Pirates to downplay the protest, it became so publicized that management was forced to acknowledge its existence. Then Pirate CEO Kevin McClatchy resigned 2 days after the protest. The protest periodically appeared in news articles as it did in the August 2010 issue of Sports Illustrated and was also a topical conversation on ESPN and CNN programs.

=== Season standings ===
NL Central
Team	W	L	Pct.	GB	Home	Road
Chicago Cubs	85	77	.525	—	44‍–‍37	41‍–‍40
Milwaukee Brewers	83	79	.512	2	51‍–‍30	32‍–‍49
St. Louis Cardinals	78	84	.481	7	43‍–‍38	35‍–‍46
Houston Astros	73	89	.451	12	42‍–‍39	31‍–‍50
Cincinnati Reds	72	90	.444	13	39‍–‍42	33‍–‍48
Pittsburgh Pirates	68	94	.420	17	37‍–‍44	31‍–‍50

=== Game log ===
2007 game log (68–94)
**April (12–12)**

#	Date	Opponent	Score	Win	Loss	Save	Attendance	Record
1	April 2	@ Astros	4–2 (10)	**Capps** (1–0)	Qualls (0–1)	**S. Torres** (1)	43,803	1–0
2	April 3	@ Astros	3–2	**Bayliss** (1–0)	Wheeler (0–1)	**S. Torres** (2)	31,238	2–0
3	April 4	@ Astros	5–4	**Gorzelanny** (1–0)	W. Williams (0–1)	**S. Torres** (3)	25,961	3–0
4	April 6	@ Reds	1–6	Belisle (1–0)	**Maholm** (0–1)	—	17,837	3–1
5	April 7	@ Reds	5–7	Harang (2–0)	**Armas** (0–1)	Weathers (2)	15,825	3–2
6	April 8	@ Reds	6–3	**Duke** (1–0)	Milton (0–1)	**S. Torres** (4)	14,001	4–2
7	April 9	Cardinals	0–3	Looper (1–1)	**Snell** (0–1)	Isringhausen (2)	38,429	4–3
8	April 10	Cardinals	2–3 (12)	B. Thompson (1–0)	**Wasdin** (0–1)	Isringhausen (3)	12,468	4–4
9	April 11	Cardinals	2–3	Franklin (1–0)	**S. Torres** (0–1)	—	9,959	4–5
10	April 13	Giants	5–8	Ortiz (1–1)	**Duke** (1–1)	—	22,117	4–6
–	April 14	Giants	Postponed (rain) Rescheduled for August 13					4–6
–	April 15	Giants	Postponed (rain) Rescheduled for August 13					4–6
11	April 16	@ Cardinals	3–2	**Snell** (1–1)	An. Reyes (0–2)	**S. Torres** (5)	43,026	5–6
12	April 17	@ Cardinals	6–1	**Gorzelanny** (2–0)	Wainwright (1–1)	—	42,446	6–6
13	April 18	@ Brewers	3–7	C. Vargas (1–0)	**Maholm** (0–2)	—	22,331	6–7
14	April 19	@ Brewers	5–7	Suppan (2–2)	**Duke** (1–2)	F. Cordero (5)	17,386	6–8
15	April 20	@ Dodgers	2–10	Wolf (3–1)	**Armas** (0–2)	—	43,845	6–9
16	April 21	@ Dodgers	3–7 (10)	Broxton (1–0)	**Bayliss** (1–1)	—	48,995	6–10
17	April 22	@ Dodgers	7–5	**Gorzelanny** (3–0)	Tomko (0–1)	**S. Torres** (6)	46,741	7–10
18	April 24	Astros	3–0	**Maholm** (1–2)	W. Williams (0–3)	—	13,062	8–10
19	April 25	Astros	4–3 (16)	**Wasdin** (1–1)	Moehler (0–1)	—	8,201	9–10
20	April 26	Astros	5–3	**Bayliss** (2–1)	W. Rodríguez (0–3)	**Grabow** (1)	12,056	10–10
21	April 27	Reds	3–1	**Snell** (2–1)	Milton (0–4)	**S. Torres** (7)	22,638	11–10
22	April 28	Reds	1–8	Belisle (3–1)	**Gorzelanny** (3–1)	—	29,514	11–11
23	April 29	Reds	5–9	Harang (4–0)	**Maholm** (1–3)	—	18,409	11–12
24	April 30	Cubs	3–2	**Capps** (2–0)	Wuertz (0–1)	**S. Torres** (8)	11,437	12–12

**May (11–18)**

#	Date	Opponent	Score	Win	Loss	Save	Attendance	Record	Record
25	May 1	Cubs	6–8	Cherry (1–1)	**Bayliss** (2–2)	—	13,082	12–13	
26	May 2	Cubs	1–7	Marquis (4–1)	**Snell** (2–2)	—	21,765	12–14	
27	May 3	@ Brewers	4–2	**Gorzelanny** (4–1)	Bush (2–3)	**S. Torres** (9)	15,602	13–14	
28	May 4	@ Brewers	0–10	C. Vargas (3–0)	**Maholm** (1–4)	—	40,190	13–15	
29	May 5	@ Brewers	3–6	Suppan (5–2)	**Duke** (1–3)	F. Cordero (11)	40,361	13–16	
30	May 6	@ Brewers	4–6	Villanueva (3–0)	**Grabow** (0–1)	F. Cordero (12)	37,761	13–17	
31	May 8	@ Cubs	4–3 (15)	**Bayliss** (3–2)	Cotts (0–1)	**S. Torres** (10)	39,708	14–17	
32	May 9	@ Cubs	0–1	Marquis (5–1)	**Gorzelanny** (4–2)	—	40,264	14–18	
33	May 10	@ Cubs	6–4	**Maholm** (2–4)	C. Zambrano (3–3)	**S. Torres** (11)	41,101	15–18	
34	May 11	Braves	1–4	Davies (1–1)	**Duke** (1–4)	M. González (2)	23,376	15–19	
35	May 12	Braves	2–9	James (4–3)	**Armas** (0–3)	—	34,775	15–20	
36	May 13	Braves	13–2	**Snell** (3–2)	Lerew (0–1)	—	19,484	16–20	
37	May 14	Marlins	7–0	**Gorzelanny** (5–2)	Willis (5–3)	—	12,958	17–20	
38	May 15	Marlins	3–9	Mitre (1–2)	**Maholm** (2–5)	—	12,769	17–21	
39	May 16	Marlins	3–4	Tankersley (3–1)	**Capps** (2–1)	Gregg (2)	15,086	17–22	
40	May 17	Marlins	7–2	**Chacón** (1–0)	Nolasco (1–2)	—	9,582	18–22	
41	May 18	D-backs	11–5	**Snell** (4–2)	D. Davis (2–5)	—	32,682	19–22	
42	May 19	D-backs	8–9	Slaten (1–0)	**Capps** (2–2)	Valverde (15)	30,677	19–23	
43	May 20	D-backs	2–5	Ra. Johnson (2–2)	**Maholm** (2–6)	Valverde (16)	24,282	19–24	
44	May 22	@ Cardinals	4–9	Wainwright (4–3)	**Duke** (1–5)	—	42,679	19–25	
45	May 23	@ Cardinals	3–5	K. Wells (2–8)	**Snell** (4–3)	Isringhausen (11)	42,245	19–26	
46	May 24	@ Cardinals	1–3	Looper (6–3)	**Gorzelanny** (5–3)	Isringhausen (12)	44,296	19–27	
47	May 25	@ Reds	10–4 (10)	**Bayliss** (4–2)	Weathers (1–3)	—	36,455	20–27	
48	May 26	@ Reds	9–5	**Grabow** (1–1)	Arroyo (2–5)	—	32,280	21–27	
49	May 27	@ Reds	14–10	**Duke** (2–5)	Saarloos (0–4)	—	27,209	22–27	
50	May 28	@ Reds	0–4	Lohse (2–6)	**Snell** (4–4)	—	17,905	22–28	
51	May 29	Padres	4–1	**Gorzelanny** (6–3)	D. Wells (2–3)	**S. Torres** (12)	15,794	23–28	
52	May 30	Padres	0–9	C. Young (6–3)	**Maholm** (2–7)	—	12,734	23–29	
53	May 31	Padres	2–4 (11)	Meredith (3–2)	**Sharpless** (0–1)	Hoffman (16)	14,966	23–30	

**June (12–15)**

#	Date	Opponent	Score	Win	Loss	Save	Attendance	Record
54	June 1	Dodgers	4–5	Wolf (7–3)	**Duke** (2–6)	Saito (16)	20,164	23–31
55	June 2	Dodgers	3–1	**Snell** (5–4)	Kuo (0–1)	**Capps** (1)	31,931	24–31
56	June 3	Dodgers	4–5	Billingsley (4–0)	**S. Torres** (0–2)	Beimel (1)	23,458	24–32
57	June 4	Dodgers	5–6	D. Lowe (6–5)	**Maholm** (2–8)	Broxton (1)	15,836	24–33
58	June 5	@ Nationals	7–6	**Chacón** (2–0)	Bacsik (1–2)	**Capps** (2)	19,169	25–33
59	June 6	@ Nationals	5–6	C. Cordero (1–0)	**S. Torres** (0–3)	—	24,755	25–34
60	June 7	@ Nationals	3–2	**Capps** (3–2)	C. Cordero (1–1)	—	25,622	26–34
61	June 8	@ Yankees	4–5 (10)	M. Rivera (2–3)	**Capps** (3–3)	—	54,240	26–35
62	June 9	@ Yankees	3–9	Clemens (1–0)	**Maholm** (2–9)	—	54,296	26–36
63	June 10	@ Yankees	6–13	Henn (2–0)	**Chacón** (2–1)	—	54,292	26–37
64	June 12	Rangers	7–5	**Duke** (3–6)	Millwood (2–6)	**Capps** (3)	21,158	27–37
65	June 13	Rangers	8–1	**Snell** (6–4)	R. Tejeda (5–7)	—	16,110	28–37
66	June 14	Rangers	0–6	Loe (2–6)	**Gorzelanny** (6–4)	—	17,214	28–38
67	June 15	White Sox	4–2	**Maholm** (3–9)	Garland (4–4)	**Capps** (4)	26,647	29–38
68	June 16	White Sox	1–6	Buehrle (4–3)	**Van Benschoten** (0–1)	—	36,610	29–39
69	June 17	White Sox	8–7	**Chacón** (3–1)	Masset (2–3)	**Capps** (5)	26,830	30–39
70	June 19	@ Mariners	5–3	**Gorzelanny** (7–4)	M. Batista (7–6)	**Chacón** (1)	24,520	31–39
71	June 20	@ Mariners	0–7	Jeff Weaver (1–6)	**Maholm** (3–10)	—	23,553	31–40
72	June 21	@ Mariners	0–3	F. Hernández (4–4)	**Van Benschoten** (0–2)	Putz (20)	22,950	31–41
73	June 22	@ Angels	4–5 (11)	S. Shields (1–2)	**Bayliss** (4–3)	—	43,545	31–42
74	June 23	@ Angels	1–10	K. Escobar (9–3)	**Snell** (6–5)	—	44,010	31–43
75	June 24	@ Angels	3–4 (10)	Bootcheck (2–1)	**Capps** (3–4)	—	42,346	31–44
76	June 26	@ Marlins	3–2	**Maholm** (4–10)	Willis (7–7)	**Capps** (6)	11,044	32–44
77	June 27	@ Marlins	7–5 (10)	**Chacón** (4–1)	Gregg (0–3)	**Capps** (7)	11,222	33–44
78	June 28	@ Marlins	7–9	Olsen (6–6)	**Duke** (3–7)	—	31,628	33–45
79	June 29	Nationals	3–2	**Capps** (4–4)	Rauch (3–2)	—	32,361	34–45
80	June 30	Nationals	7–2	**Gorzelanny** (8–4)	Bergmann (1–5)	—	26,959	35–45

**July (7–17)**

#	Date	Opponent	Score	Win	Loss	Save	Attendance	Record
81	July 1	Nationals	2–3	Bacsik (2–5)	**Maholm** (4–11)	C. Cordero (14)	19,149	35–46
82	July 2	Brewers	3–10	Villanueva (6–0)	**Kuwata** (0–1)	—	14,455	35–47
83	July 3	Brewers	6–2	**Youman** (1–0)	Gallardo (1–1)	—	25,416	36–47
84	July 4	Brewers	5–3	**Snell** (7–5)	C. Vargas (6–2)	**Capps** (8)	35,878	37–47
85	July 5	Brewers	6–3	**Gorzelanny** (9–4)	Sheets (10–4)	**Capps** (9)	15,134	38–47
86	July 6	Cubs	8–4	**Maholm** (5–11)	Marquis (6–5)	—	27,868	39–47
87	July 7	Cubs	1–7	Lilly (8–4)	**Van Benschoten** (0–3)	—	33,293	39–48
88	July 8	Cubs	6–2	**Youman** (2–0)	C. Zambrano (10–7)	—	22,470	40–48
89	July 13	@ Braves	1–9	T. Hudson (9–5)	**Snell** (7–6)	—	38,922	40–49
90	July 14	@ Braves	4–5	Wickman (2–2)	**Chacón** (4–2)	—	44,041	40–50
91	July 15	@ Braves	1–5	Carlyle (4–2)	**Maholm** (5–12)	—	30,756	40–51
92	July 16	Rockies	8–10	Hawkins (1–4)	**Van Benschoten** (0–4)	Corpas (2)	16,423	40–52
93	July 17	Rockies	2–6	Fogg (5–6)	**Youman** (2–1)	—	21,604	40–53
94	July 18	Rockies	3–5	Francis (10–5)	**Snell** (7–7)	Corpas (3)	19,285	40–54
95	July 20	Astros	1–2	Oswalt (9–6)	**Gorzelanny** (9–5)	Lidge (2)	33,541	40–55
96	July 21	Astros	7–3	**Maholm** (6–12)	W. Rodríguez (6–9)	—	32,068	41–55
97	July 22	Astros	0–1	W. Williams (5–11)	**Youman** (2–2)	Lidge (3)	22,404	41–56
98	July 24	@ Mets	4–8	Maine (11–5)	**Snell** (7–8)	—	49,122	41–57
99	July 25	@ Mets	3–6	Glavine (9–6)	**Gorzelanny** (9–6)	B. Wagner (23)	44,906	41–58
100	July 26	@ Mets	8–4	**Maholm** (7–12)	Ól. Pérez (9–7)	—	52,150	42–58
101	July 27	@ Phillies	1–8 (7)	Moyer (9–8)	**Van Benschoten** (0–5)	—	37,136	42–59
102	July 28	@ Phillies	5–10	Durbin (3–2)	**Youman** (2–3)	—	45,149	42–60
103	July 29	@ Phillies	1–5	Kendrick (5–1)	**Snell** (7–9)	—	40,030	42–61
104	July 31	Cardinals	4–6	Wainwright (10–8)	**Maholm** (7–13)	Isringhausen (21)	24,085	42–62

**August (17–13)**

#	Date	Opponent	Score	Win	Loss	Save	Attendance	Record
105	August 1	Cardinals	15–1	**Armas** (1–3)	Looper (8–9)	—	17,041	43–62
106	August 2	Cardinals	5–4 (11)	**S. Torres** (1–3)	B. Thompson (6–5)	—	19,132	44–62
107	August 3	Reds	4–13	Belisle (6–8)	**Snell** (7–10)	—	22,874	44–63
108	August 4	Reds	8–9 (10)	Burton (3–1)	**Capps** (4–5)	Weathers (21)	33,466	44–64
–	August 5	Reds	Postponed (rain) Rescheduled for August 28					44–64
109	August 7	@ D-backs	8–3	**Gorzelanny** (10–6)	Owings (5–6)	—	25,340	45–64
110	August 8	@ D-backs	6–10	Éd. González (5–2)	**Maholm** (7–14)	Valverde (34)	23,082	45–65
111	August 9	@ D-backs	2–4	S. Davis (9–10)	**Chacón** (4–3)	Valverde (35)	22,316	45–66
112	August 10	@ Giants	8–7	**Grabow** (2–1)	Chulk (4–4)	**Capps** (10)	41,923	46–66
113	August 11	@ Giants	13–3	**Armas** (2–3)	Lincecum (6–3)	—	43,105	47–66
114	August 12	@ Giants	5–0	**Gorzelanny** (11–6)	Zito (8–11)	—	41,976	48–66
115	August 13	Giants	3–1	**Maholm** (8–14)	Cain (4–13)	—		49–66
116	August 13	Giants	3–10	Lowry (13–7)	**Youman** (2–4)	—	25,434	49–67
117	August 14	Mets	4–5	J. Sosa (9–6)	**Torres** (1–4)	B. Wagner (27)	25,277	49–68
118	August 15	Mets	8–10	Maine (13–7)	**Morris** (7–8)	B. Wagner (28)	18,241	49–69
119	August 16	Mets	10–7	**D. Marte** (1–0)	Heilman (7–5)	**Capps** (11)	36,447	50–69
120	August 17	Phillies	8–11	J. D. Durbin (5–2)	**Gorzelanny** (11–7)	—	37,072	50–70
121	August 18	Phillies	11–6	**Maholm** (9–14)	Moyer (11–9)	—	38,152	51–70
122	August 19	Phillies	8–4	**Snell** (8–10)	Romero (1–1)		31,277	52–70
123	August 20	@ Rockies	4–2	**D. Marte** (2–0)	Fuentes (0–5)	**Capps** (12)	22,682	53–70
124	August 21	@ Rockies	2–9	T. Buchholz (6–4)	**Armas** (2–4)	—	21,136	53–71
125	August 22	@ Rockies	11–2	**Gorzelanny** (12–7)	Fogg (7–9)	—	20,629	54–71
126	August 23	@ Rockies	5–1	**Maholm** (10–14)	F. Morales (0–1)	—	20,380	55–71
127	August 24	@ Astros	8–3 (15)	**Youman** (3–4)	Driskill (0–1)	—	41,403	56–71
128	August 25	@ Astros	4–1	**Morris** (8–8)	Patton (0–1)	**Capps** (13)	41,109	57–71
129	August 26	@ Astros	4–5	McLemore (3–0)	**Chacón** (4–4)	Lidge (13)	42,564	57–72
130	August 28	Reds	6–4	**Gorzelanny** (13–7)	El. Ramírez (0–2)	**Capps** (14)	—	58–72
131	August 28	Reds	3–2	**Chacón** (5–4)	Bray (3–1)	**Capps** (15)	17,669	59–72
132	August 29	Reds	0–8	Harang (14–3)	**Snell** (8–11)	—	14,191	59–73
133	August 30	Reds	4–5	Burton (4–1)	**Capps** (4–6)	Weathers (29)	12,643	59–74
134	August 31	@ Brewers	2–3	Gallardo (6–4)	**Armas** (2–5)	F. Cordero (38)	35,689	59–75

**September (9–19)**

#	Date	Opponent	Score	Win	Loss	Save	Attendance	Record
135	September 1	@ Brewers	3–12	Bush (11–9)	**Youman** (3–5)	—	34,190	59–76
136	September 2	@ Brewers	4–7	Suppan (9–11)	**Osoria** (0–1)	F. Cordero (39)	39,339	59–77
137	September 3	@ Cardinals	11–0	**Snell** (9–11)	K. Wells (6–16)	—	42,238	60–77
138	September 4	@ Cardinals	2–6	Piñeiro (5–3)	**Morris** (8–9)	Franklin (1)	42,300	60–78
139	September 5	@ Cardinals	8–2	**Armas** (3–5)	Mulder (0–1)	—	42,299	61–78
140	September 6	@ Cardinals	4–16	Jiménez (2–0)	**Bullington** (0–1)	—	42,330	61–79
141	September 7	Cubs	6–1	**Gorzelanny** (14–7)	R. Hill (8–8)	—	24,489	62–79
142	September 8	Cubs	1–5	C. Zambrano (15–12)	**Snell** (9–12)	—	33,373	62–80
143	September 9	Cubs	10–5	**Morris** (9–9)	Trachsel (6–10)	—	21,861	63–80
144	September 10	Brewers	9–0	**Armas** (4–5)	Villanueva (7–4)	—	13,683	64–80
145	September 11	Brewers	1–6	Gallardo (8–4)	**Bullington** (0–2)	—	11,962	64–81
146	September 12	Brewers	7–4	**Grabow** (3–1)	Turnbow (4–5)	**Capps** (16)	10,566	65–81
147	September 14	@ Astros	4–3	**Sánchez** (1–0)	Qualls (6–5)	**Capps** (17)	35,352	66–81
148	September 15	@ Astros	7–9	Gutiérrez (1–1)	**Morris** (9–10)	Lidge (15)	40,425	66–82
149	September 16	@ Astros	3–15	Backe (1–1)	**Maholm** (10–15)	—	35,715	66–83
150	September 17	@ Padres	0–3	Cassel (1–0)	**Van Benschoten** (0–6)	Hoffman (38)	33,557	66–84
151	September 18	@ Padres	3–5	Maddux (13–10)	**Gorzelanny** (14–8)	Hoffman (39)	30,629	66–85
152	September 19	@ Padres	3–5	Meredith (5–6)	**Capps** (4–7)	—	26,354	66–86
153	September 20	@ Padres	3–6	Tomko (4–11)	**Morris** (9–11)	Hoffman (40)	27,020	66–87
154	September 21	@ Cubs	8–13	Eyre (2–1)	**Osoria** (0–2)	—	41,591	66–88
155	September 22	@ Cubs	5–9	Hill (10–8)	**Duke** (3–8)	—	41,271	66–89
156	September 23	@ Cubs	0–8	Zambrano (17–13)	**Gorzelanny** (14–9)	—	41,364	66–90
157	September 25	D-backs	6–5	**Torres** (2–4)	Lyon (6–4)	**Capps** (18)	14,569	67–90
158	September 26	D-backs	5–1	**Morris** (10–11)	Hernández (11–11)	—	16,289	68–90
159	September 27	D-backs	0–8	Owings (8–8)	**Van Benschoten** (0–7)	—	11,335	68–91
160	September 28	Cardinals	1–6	Springer (8–1)	**Grabow** (3–2)	—	30,603	68–92
161	September 29	Cardinals	3–7	Wainwright (14–12)	**Gorzelanny** (14–10)	—	35,169	68–93
162	September 30	Cardinals	5–6	Wells (7–17)	**Bullington** (0–3)	Isringhausen (32)	25,664	68–94

Legend: = Win = Loss = Postponement
**Bold** = Pirates team member Source = baseball-reference.com

=== Record vs. opponents ===
2007 National League record Source: MLB Standings Grid – 2007
Team	AZ	ATL	CHC	CIN	COL	FLA	HOU	LAD	MIL	NYM	PHI	PIT	SD	SF	STL	WAS	AL
Arizona	—	4–2	4–2	2–4	8–10	6–1	5–2	8–10	2–5	3–4	5–1	5–4	10–8	10–8	4–3	6–1	8–7
Atlanta	2–4	—	5–4	1–6	4–2	10–8	3–3	4–3	5–2	9–9	9–9	5–1	5–2	4–3	3–4	11–7	4–11
Chicago	2–4	4–5	—	9–9	5–2	0–6	8–7	2–5	9–6	2–5	3–4	8–7	3–5	5–2	11–5	6–1	8–4
Cincinnati	4–2	6–1	9–9	—	2–4	4–3	4–11	2–4	8–7	2–5	2–4	9–7	2–4	4–3	6–9	1–6	7–11
Colorado	10–8	2–4	2–5	4–2	—	3–3	3–4	12–6	4–2	4–2	4–3	4–3	11–8	10–8	3–4	4–3	10–8
Florida	1–6	8–10	6–0	3–4	3–3	—	2–3	4–3	2–5	7–11	9–9	3–4	3–4	1–6	2–4	8–10	9–9
Houston	2–5	3–3	7–8	11–4	4–3	3–2	—	4–3	5–13	2–5	3–3	5–10	4–3	2–4	7–9	2–5	9–9
Los Angeles	10–8	3–4	5–2	4–2	6–12	3–4	3–4	—	3–3	5–5	4–2	5–2	8–10	10–8	3–3	5–1	5–10
Milwaukee	5–2	2–5	6–9	7–8	2–4	5–2	13–5	3–3	—	2–4	3–4	10–6	2–5	4–5	7–8	4–2	8–7
New York	4–3	9–9	5–2	5–2	2–4	11–7	5–2	5–5	4–2	—	6–12	4–2	2–4	4–2	5–2	9–9	8–7
Philadelphia	1–5	9–9	4–3	4–2	3–4	9–9	3–3	2–4	4–3	12–6	—	4–2	4–3	4–4	6–3	12–6	8–7
Pittsburgh	4–5	1–5	7–8	7–9	3–4	4–3	10–5	2–5	6–10	2–4	2–4	—	1–6	4–2	6–12	4–2	5–10
San Diego	8–10	2–5	5–3	4–2	8–11	4–3	3–4	10–8	5–2	4–2	3–4	6–1	—	14–4	3–4	4–2	6–9
San Francisco	8–10	3–4	2–5	3–4	8–10	6–1	4–2	8–10	5–4	2–4	4–4	2–4	4–14	—	4–1	3–4	5–10
St. Louis	3–4	4–3	5–11	9–6	4–3	4–2	9–7	3–3	8–7	2–5	3–6	12–6	4–3	1–4	—	1–5	6–9
Washington	1–6	7–11	1–6	6–1	3–4	10–8	5–2	1–5	2–4	9–9	6–12	2–4	2–4	4–3	5–1	—	9–9

=== Detailed records ===
**National League**
Opponent	W	L	WP	RS	RA
**NL East**
Atlanta Braves	1	5	0.167	22	34
Florida Marlins	4	3	0.571	37	31
New York Mets	2	4	0.333	37	40
Philadelphia Phillies	2	4	0.333	34	44
Washington Nationals	4	2	0.667	27	21
Total	13	18	0.419	157	170
**NL Central**
Chicago Cubs	7	8	0.467	65	79
Cincinnati Reds	7	9	0.438	79	98
Houston Astros	10	5	0.667	62	56
Milwaukee Brewers	6	10	0.375	65	88
St. Louis Cardinals	6	12	0.333	79	83
Total	36	44	0.450	350	404
**NL West**
Arizona Diamondbacks	4	5	0.444	48	50
Colorado Rockies	3	4	0.429	35	35
Los Angeles Dodgers	2	5	0.286	28	39
San Diego Padres	1	6	0.143	15	33
San Francisco Giants	4	2	0.667	37	29
Total	14	22	0.389	163	186
**American League**
Chicago White Sox	2	1	0.667	13	15
Los Angeles Angels of Anaheim	0	3	0.000	8	19
New York Yankees	0	3	0.000	13	27
Seattle Mariners	1	2	0.333	5	13
Texas Rangers	2	1	0.667	15	12
Total	5	10	0.333	54	86
Season Total	68	94	0.420	724	846

Month	Games	Won	Lost	Win %	RS	RA
April	24	12	12	0.500	86	106
May	29	11	18	0.379	132	150
June	27	12	15	0.444	112	137
July	24	7	17	0.292	90	127
August	30	17	13	0.567	182	153
September	28	9	19	0.321	122	173
Total	162	68	94	0.420	724	846

	Games	Won	Lost	Win %	RS	RA
Home	81	37	44	0.457	373	390
Away	81	31	50	0.383	351	456
Total	162	68	94	0.420	724	846

== Roster ==
2007 Pittsburgh Pirates
Roster
Pitchers: 46 Tony Armas Jr.; 54 Jonah Bayliss; 49 Bryan Bullington; 55 Matt Capps; 32 Shawn Chacón; 50 Dave Davidson; 57 Zach Duke; 24 Tom Gorzelanny; 34 John Grabow; 59 Dan Kolb; 18 Masumi Kuwata; 28 Paul Maholm; 43 Dámaso Marte; 39 Marty McLeary; 35 Matt Morris; 36 Juan Pérez; 59 Brian Rogers; 58 Rómulo Sánchez; 44 Josh Sharpless; 45 Ian Snell; 16 Salomón Torres; 47 John Van Benschoten; 37 John Wasdin; 27 Shane Youman	Catchers: 11 Humberto Cota; 51 Carlos Maldonado; 26 Ronny Paulino; Infielders: 19 José Bautista; 14 José Castillo; 35 Brad Eldred; 3 César Izturis; 53 Matt Kata; 29 Don Kelly; 25 Adam LaRoche; 5 Josh Phelps; 12 Freddy Sanchez; 2 Jack Wilson	Outfielders: 38 Jason Bay; 10 Rajai Davis; 41 Ryan Doumit; 6 Chris Duffy; 49,13 Nate McLouth; 29 Nyjer Morgan; 22 Xavier Nady; 18 Steve Pearce	Manager: 23 Jim Tracy; Coaches: 48 Jim Colborn (pitching); 7 Jeff Cox (third base); 17 Bobby Cuellar (bullpen); 15 Jim Lett (bench); 30 Jeff Manto (hitting); 31 John Shelby (first base)

=== Opening Day lineup ===
Opening Day Starters
Name	Position
Chris Duffy	CF
Jack Wilson	SS
Jason Bay	LF
Adam LaRoche	1B
Ronny Paulino	C
Xavier Nady	RF
José Bautista	3B
José Castillo	2B
Zach Duke	SP

== Statistics ==
Hitting

Note: G = Games played; AB = At bats; H = Hits; Avg. = Batting average; HR = Home runs; RBI = Runs batted in

Regular season
Player	G	AB	H	Avg.	HR	RBI
M. Capps	72	1	1	1.000	0	0
J. Phelps	58	77	27	0.351	5	19
B. Bullington	5	3	1	0.333	0	0
M. Morris	11	19	6	0.316	1	2
F. Sanchez	147	602	183	0.304	11	81
N. Morgan	28	107	32	0.299	1	7
J. Wilson	135	477	141	0.296	12	56
S. Pearce	23	68	20	0.294	0	6
H. Cota	5	14	4	0.286	0	3
X. Nady	125	431	120	0.278	20	72
C. Izturis	45	123	34	0.276	0	8
R. Doumit	83	252	69	0.274	9	32
S. Chacón	61	11	3	0.273	0	0
A. LaRoche	152	563	153	0.272	21	88
R. Davis	24	48	13	0.271	0	2
R. Paulino	133	457	120	0.263	11	55
N. McLouth	137	329	85	0.258	13	38
J. Bautista	142	532	135	0.254	15	63
Z. Duke	20	32	8	0.250	0	3
M. Kata	47	88	22	0.250	1	10
C. Duffy	70	241	60	0.249	3	22
J. Bay	145	538	133	0.247	21	84
J. Castillo	87	221	54	0.244	0	24
C. Maldonado	13	24	5	0.208	2	4
P. Maholm	27	59	11	0.186	0	5
D. Kelly	25	27	4	0.148	0	0
J. Van Benschoten	10	7	1	0.143	0	0
T. Armas	29	26	3	0.115	0	2
B. Eldred	19	46	5	0.109	2	3
I. Snell	34	57	5	0.088	0	2
S. Youman	16	12	1	0.083	0	0
T. Gorzelanny	29	63	4	0.063	0	3
J. Grabow	59	1	0	0.000	0	0
D. Marte	62	2	0	0.000	0	0
M. McLeary	4	2	0	0.000	0	0
F. Osoria	25	4	0	0.000	0	0
R. Sánchez	16	1	0	0.000	0	0
J. Wasdin	12	4	0	0.000	0	0
J. Bayliss	34	0	0	—	0	0
D. Davidson	2	0	0	—	0	0
D. Kolb	2	0	0	—	0	0
M. Kuwata	14	0	0	—	0	0
J. Pérez	17	0	0	—	0	0
B. Rogers	3	0	0	—	0	0
J. Sharpless	5	0	0	—	0	0
S. Torres	55	0	0	—	0	0
Team totals	162	5,569	1,463	0.263	148	694

Pitching

Note: G = Games pitched; IP = Innings pitched; W = Wins; L = Losses; ERA = Earned run average; SO = Strikeouts

Regular season
Player	G	IP	W	L	ERA	SO
M. Capps	76	79	4	7	2.28	64
D. Marte	65	45 1/3	2	0	2.38	51
I. Snell	32	208	9	12	3.76	177
T. Gorzelanny	32	201 2/3	14	10	3.88	135
S. Chacón	64	96	5	4	3.94	79
J. Pérez	17	12 1/3	0	0	4.38	10
J. Grabow	63	51 2/3	3	2	4.53	42
F. Osoria	25	28 1/3	0	2	4.76	13
R. Sánchez	16	18	1	0	5.00	11
P. Maholm	29	177 2/3	10	15	5.02	105
B. Bullington	5	17	0	3	5.29	7
S. Torres	56	52 2/3	2	4	5.47	45
Z. Duke	20	107 1/3	3	8	5.53	41
J. Wasdin	12	19 2/3	1	1	5.95	10
S. Youman	16	57 1/3	3	5	5.97	29
T. Armas	31	97	4	5	6.03	73
M. Morris	11	62	3	4	6.10	29
M. McLeary	4	7 2/3	0	0	8.22	5
J. Bayliss	39	37 2/3	4	3	8.36	29
D. Kolb	3	3	0	0	9.00	2
M. Kuwata	19	21	0	1	9.43	12
J. Van Benschoten	11	39	0	7	10.15	26
J. Sharpless	6	4 1/3	0	1	12.46	1
B. Rogers	3	2	0	0	13.50	1
D. Davidson	2	2	0	0	22.50	0
Team totals	162	1,447 2/3	68	94	4.93	997

Source:2007 Pittsburgh Pirates stats at Baseball Reference.com

== Awards and honors ==
2007 Major League Baseball All-Star Game

- Freddy Sanchez, 2B, reserve

== Farm system ==
Level	Team	League	Manager
AAA	Indianapolis Indians	International League	Trent Jewett
AA	Altoona Curve	Eastern League	Tim Leiper
A	Lynchburg Hillcats	Carolina League	Jeff Branson
A	Hickory Crawdads	South Atlantic League	Gary Green
A-Short Season	State College Spikes	New York–Penn League	Turner Ward
Rookie	GCL Pirates	Gulf Coast League	Tom Prince
Rookie	DSL Pirates	Dominican Summer League	N/A
Rookie	VSL Pirates	Venezuelan Summer League	N/A
