= 2007 Milwaukee Brewers season =

2007 Milwaukee Brewers
- League: National League
- Division: Central
- Ballpark: Miller Park
- City: Milwaukee, Wisconsin
- Record: 83–79 (.512)
- Divisional place: 2nd
- Owners: Mark Attanasio
- General managers: Doug Melvin
- Managers: Ned Yost
- Television: WMLW-CA; FSN Wisconsin (Brian Anderson, Bill Schroeder)
- Radio: 620 WTMJ (Bob Uecker, Jim Powell)
- Stats: ESPN.com; Baseball Reference

The 2007 Milwaukee Brewers season was the 38th season for the Brewers in Milwaukee, their 10th in the National League, and their 39th overall. It also marked the 25th anniversary of the Milwaukee Brewers winning the American League pennant and the 50th anniversary of the Milwaukee Braves winning the World Series.

During the offseason, the Brewers re-signed free agents Bill Hall and Chris Capuano. The Brewers were also able to sign starting pitcher Jeff Suppan, second baseman Craig Counsell, and third baseman Tony Graffanino from free agency.

The Brewers finished in second place in the National League Central with a record of 83–79, achieving their first winning record since 1992. During the franchise's 25-year playoff drought from 1983-2007, 2007 tied with 1988 (at 2 games back) as the closest the team came to making the playoffs.

== Offseason ==
The Brewers headed into the season celebrating the 25th anniversary of their American League Championship. They prepared for the season by hosting reunions and premiering a video of the 1982 team at the Pabst Theater. The Brewers announced they would celebrate the 1982 team on "Retro Fridays" by having fan giveaways relating to the pennant-winning team. Milwaukee also celebrated the 50th anniversary of the 1957 Milwaukee Braves victory in the World Series.

During the offseason, the Milwaukee Brewers increased their payroll from $54.5 million to $68 million, a significant amount for a small-market team. The Brewers re-signed arbitration-eligible pitcher Chris Capuano, whose salary increased from $450,000 to $3.25 million, and arbitration-eligible Bill Hall, who signed a four-year, $24 million contract, largest on the team. Both were members of the Brewers team in 2006. The Brewers were able to acquire free agent starting pitcher Jeff Suppan from the St. Louis Cardinals by signing him to a four-year, $42 million deal. They also signed second baseman Craig Counsell of the Arizona Diamondbacks and third baseman Tony Graffanino of the Kansas City Royals off of free agency.

=== Notable offseason transactions ===
- March 26, 2007: Brady Clark and cash were traded by the Brewers to the Los Angeles Dodgers for Elmer Dessens.

== Regular season ==
=== Season summary ===
==== Strong start of the season ====
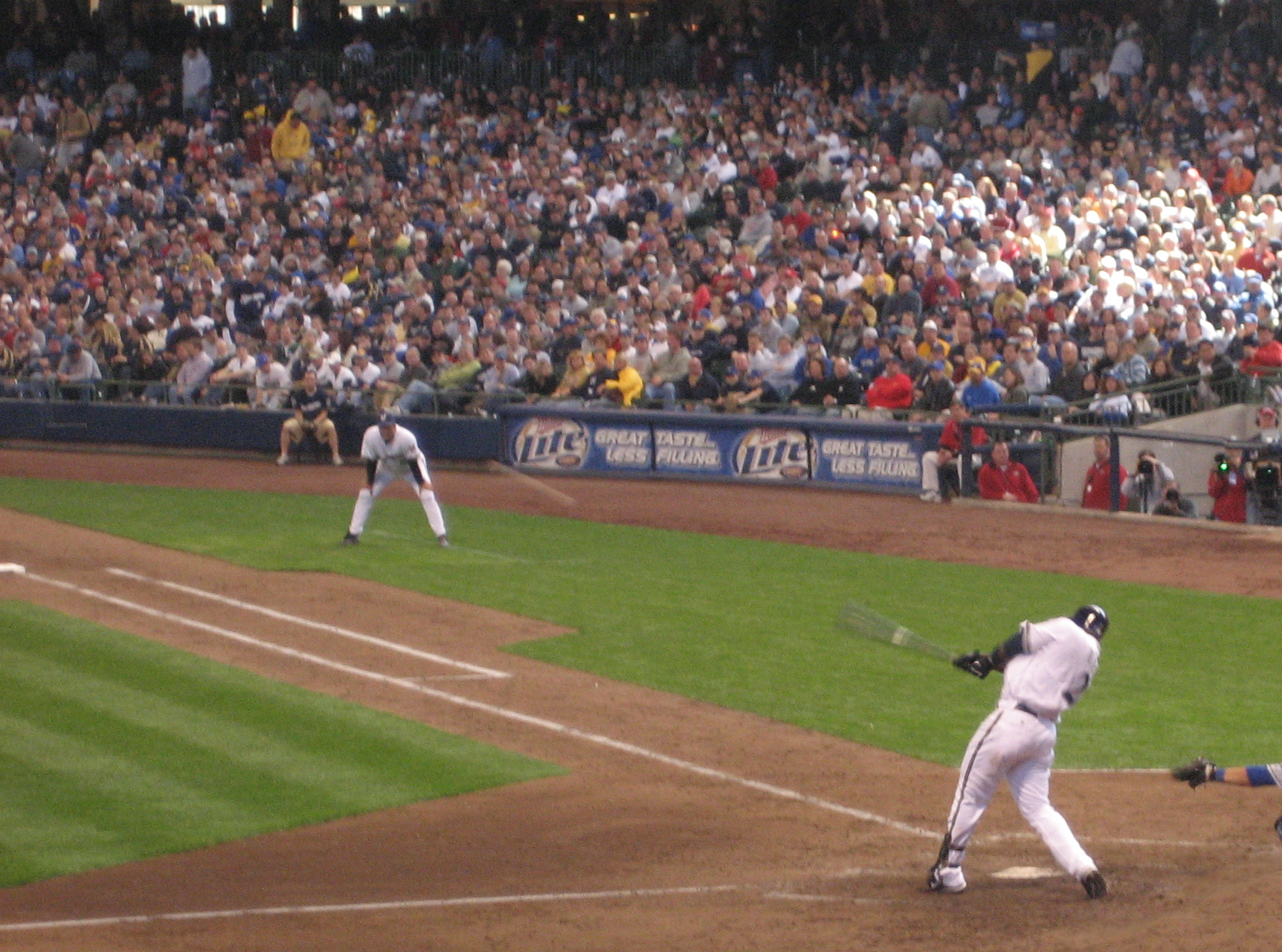
Bill Hall hits a home run on opening day against the Dodgers

The Brewers 2007 season began with a 7-1 victory on opening day over the Los Angeles Dodgers behind a complete game two-hitter by starting-pitcher Ben Sheets, becoming the first Brewer pitcher to throw a complete game on opening day since 1979. The Brewers would win their next game before dropping three in a row, including one to the Dodgers and the first two games of a three-game series with the Chicago Cubs. With a record of .500 after the first homestand of the season, the Brewers went on the road to win two games of a three-game set with the Florida Marlins. Continuing their road trip, the Brewers split games against the Cardinals after the first game of the series was postponed due to rain. After splitting games with the Cincinnati Reds, the Brewers moved into first place in the NL Central. The Brewers returned to Miller Park to win four of their next five games, sweeping the Pittsburgh Pirates and winning twice against the Houston Astros.

The Brewers played on the road for their next six games, winning two of three games against both the Cubs and Astros. The Brewers finished the month of April with a win against the Cardinals, in which Brewers starting pitcher Jeff Suppan pitched a complete game. During this game all players wore a special black "32" patch on their left arms to commemorate recently deceased Cardinals pitcher Josh Hancock. Suppan's win gave him four on the season, tying him with Chris Capuano for the team lead after April. Brewers closer Francisco Cordero recorded a franchise record and league-leading ten saves in the month of April. Cordero finished April without allowing an earned run in twelve appearances. The Brewers ended the month with a 3 1/2 game lead in the NL Central.

The Brewers started May by completing a three-game sweep of the Cardinals and improved to an MLB-leading 18–9 record. The Brewers went on to win six of their next seven games; they won three of four against the Pirates and swept a three-game series with the Washington Nationals.

==== Early-season slump ====
The Brewers hit a slump when they went on an east coast trip to face the New York Mets and the Philadelphia Phillies, posting a 2-5 record. The Brewers returned home to face their interleague rivals, the Minnesota Twins. The Brewers won the last of a three-game series, a game which saw Geoff Jenkins hit his 200th home run. The Brewers then traveled to California for a six-game road-trip. They lost two of three from the Dodgers and were swept by the San Diego Padres. On May 24 during the San Diego Padres series, the Brewers called up Ryan Braun from the minor league Nashville Sounds. Braun became the Brewers starting third-baseman was placed in the third batting spot, ahead of Prince Fielder.

The Brewers returned home to start a ten-game home-stand, winning two of four games against the Atlanta Braves. At the end of May, first baseman Prince Fielder was voted the National League's Player of the Month. Fielder led the league in home runs with 19 and recorded a .755 on-base percentage and a .321 batting average. The Brewers played the Florida Marlins to continue their home-stand. They won two of three games to give the Brewers their first series victory since May 9. The win gave the Brewers a 6 1/2 lead in the NL Central. The Brewers finished their home-stand losing two of three games to the Chicago Cubs.

The Brewers started a nine-game interleague road trip with a series against the Texas Rangers. The Brewers lost the first two games against the struggling Rangers. In the second game of the series, former Ranger Francisco Cordero recorded his first blown save of the year. Before the game, Cordero held a 0.36 earned run average and an MLB-leading 22 saves. The following day, Cordero gave up his second blown save after the Rangers tied the game in the ninth inning. The Brewers would eventually win the game, snapping their seven-game losing streak after a Geoff Jenkins home run in the twelfth inning. On June 12, Justin Verlander of the Detroit Tigers pitched a no-hitter against the Brewers. The no-hitter was the first for the Tigers since 1984. The loss was the Brewers 20th in their past 30 games.

==== June turn-around ====
Following the no-hitter, the Brewers recorded eleven hits and defeated the Tigers in a comeback win. The following day, the Brewers defeated the Tigers to win the series. The Brewers traveled to Minnesota to face the rival Twins. In the first game, the Brewers recorded fifteen hits with an 11–3 win. In the three games following the no hitter, the Brewers recorded 39 hits and 20 runs. The Brewers were victorious in two of three games against the Twins.

After their road-stint, the Brewers came home for their next nine games. After starting-pitcher Chris Capuano was placed on the disabled-list, the Brewers called up Yovani Gallardo from the minor leagues. Gallardo pitched 6 1/3 innings, allowing three runs, and hit an RBI double in front of a sell-out crowd to give the Brewers their fifth win in six games against the San Francisco Giants. The following day the Brewers clinched their third straight series victory, with Ben Sheets pitching his second complete game of the year. The Brewers would go on to sweep the Giants and win two of three games from the Kansas City Royals. The Brewers would follow with another series sweep against the Houston Astros, winning the third game of the series in part because of an 11th-inning walk-off home run by back-up catcher Damian Miller. The Brewers were 8–1 on the home-stand.

==== Pre-break road trip ====
After their successful home stand, the Brewers went on the road for three series before the All-Star break. The Brewers defeated the second place Cubs in one of three games. During the series it was announced that Prince Fielder, Ben Sheets, J. J. Hardy and Francisco Cordero would be attending the 2007 Major League Baseball All-Star Game. This would be the first time four Brewer representatives have attended since 1983, when the Brewers were in the American League and the all-star team was managed by Milwaukee skipper Harvey Kuenn.

At the end of June Ben Sheets was named pitcher of the month and Ryan Braun the rookie of the month. Sheets was 5–0 with a 2.16 ERA in six starts, and Braun recorded a .382 average with six home runs, 21 RBI, a .716 slugging percentage.

Following their series in Chicago, the Brewers traveled to Pittsburgh to face the fourth-place Pirates. The Brewers won the first game of a four-game series. In the game Damian Miller hit a franchise tying seven RBIs and a grand slam in his first start after his walk-off home run at Miller Park. The Brewers then won one of three games against the Nationals and ended up 3–7 on the road trip.

==== Dog days of summer ====
The Brewers went into the All-Star break 10 games above .500, and a 4 1/2 game lead on the Cubs. The Brewers then had 18 games scheduled in a 17-day period. The Brewers started the stretch with a 6–4 homestand, but then went on to lose 6 of 8 on the road. With their first off day in 2 1/2 weeks, the Brewers record stood at 57-48, but the Cubs had moved to within a game and a half of the division lead. Then, on the final day of July, the Brewers were able to defeat the Mets in a 13 inning game, due to a Geoff Jenkins walk-off home run. After the game, Rickie Weeks was sent down to AAA Nashville. For the first time in over a hundred days, the division lead did not belong to the Brewers.

The Brewers frustrations continued in August, resulting in a dugout altercation during a loss to the Mets between Johnny Estrada and manager Ned Yost on August 2, 2007. Later, on August 8, infielder Tony Graffanino tore his ACL in a 19–4 loss to the Colorado Rockies, resulting in his loss for the season. The Brewers then called up Weeks to take his place on the roster.

In August Brewers first baseman Prince Fielder was suspended 3 games for arguing with the home plate umpire Wally Bell.

On August 29, the Brewers slipped into 3rd place, behind the Chicago Cubs and St. Louis Cardinals and were one game below .500 for the first time since April 6.

==== The race to October ====
Despite tumbling in August the Brewers started September on a high note to be tied with the Chicago Cubs for first place in the division. For the first time in over 15 years in Brewers history a coin toss was held to decide homefield advantage should the Cardinals, Cubs and Brewers tie for the division. One coin toss decided that the Brewers would host St. Louis, while the other decided that the Brewers would travel to Chicago for any one game playoff that may be needed.

On September 9, the Brewers became the first road team in history to open a game by hitting three consecutive home runs. The win, solidified by a Cubs loss gives the Brewers a one-game lead in the division. However, the Brewers failed to either win the division or make the playoffs.

=== Season standings ===
==== National League Central ====
NL Central
Team	W	L	Pct.	GB	Home	Road
Chicago Cubs	85	77	.525	—	44‍–‍37	41‍–‍40
Milwaukee Brewers	83	79	.512	2	51‍–‍30	32‍–‍49
St. Louis Cardinals	78	84	.481	7	43‍–‍38	35‍–‍46
Houston Astros	73	89	.451	12	42‍–‍39	31‍–‍50
Cincinnati Reds	72	90	.444	13	39‍–‍42	33‍–‍48
Pittsburgh Pirates	68	94	.420	17	37‍–‍44	31‍–‍50

==== Record vs. opponents ====
2007 National League record Source: MLB Standings Grid – 2007
Team	AZ	ATL	CHC	CIN	COL	FLA	HOU	LAD	MIL	NYM	PHI	PIT	SD	SF	STL	WAS	AL
Arizona	—	4–2	4–2	2–4	8–10	6–1	5–2	8–10	2–5	3–4	5–1	5–4	10–8	10–8	4–3	6–1	8–7
Atlanta	2–4	—	5–4	1–6	4–2	10–8	3–3	4–3	5–2	9–9	9–9	5–1	5–2	4–3	3–4	11–7	4–11
Chicago	2–4	4–5	—	9–9	5–2	0–6	8–7	2–5	9–6	2–5	3–4	8–7	3–5	5–2	11–5	6–1	8–4
Cincinnati	4–2	6–1	9–9	—	2–4	4–3	4–11	2–4	8–7	2–5	2–4	9–7	2–4	4–3	6–9	1–6	7-11
Colorado	10–8	2–4	2–5	4–2	—	3–3	3–4	12–6	4–2	4–2	4–3	4–3	11–8	10–8	3–4	4–3	10–8
Florida	1–6	8–10	6–0	3–4	3–3	—	2–3	4–3	2–5	7–11	9–9	3–4	3–4	1–6	2–4	8–10	9–9
Houston	2–5	3–3	7–8	11–4	4–3	3-2	—	4–3	5–13	2–5	3–3	5–10	4–3	2–4	7–9	2–5	9–9
Los Angeles	10–8	3–4	5–2	4–2	6–12	3–4	3–4	—	3–3	5–5	4–2	5–2	8–10	10–8	3–3	5–1	5–10
Milwaukee	5–2	2–5	6–9	7–8	2–4	5–2	13–5	3–3	—	2–4	3–4	10–6	2–5	4–5	7–8	4–2	8–7
New York	4–3	9–9	5–2	5–2	2–4	11–7	5–2	5–5	4–2	—	6–12	4–2	2–4	4–2	5–2	9–9	8–7
Philadelphia	1-5	9–9	4–3	4–2	3–4	9–9	3–3	2–4	4–3	12–6	—	4–2	4–3	4–4	6–3	12–6	8–7
Pittsburgh	4–5	1–5	7–8	7–9	3–4	4–3	10–5	2–5	6–10	2–4	2–4	—	1–6	4–2	6–12	4–2	5–10
San Diego	8–10	2–5	5–3	4–2	8–11	4–3	3–4	10–8	5–2	4–2	3–4	6–1	—	14–4	3–4	4–2	6–9
San Francisco	8–10	3–4	2–5	3–4	8–10	6–1	4–2	8–10	5–4	2–4	4–4	2–4	4–14	—	4–1	3–4	5–10
St. Louis	3–4	4–3	5–11	9–6	4–3	4-2	9–7	3–3	8–7	2–5	3–6	12–6	4–3	1–4	—	1–5	6–9
Washington	1–6	7–11	1–6	6–1	3–4	10-8	5–2	1–5	2–4	9–9	6–12	2–4	2–4	4–3	5–1	—	9–9

=== Notable transactions ===
- August 9, 2007: Elmer Dessens was released by the Brewers.

=== Roster ===
2007 Milwaukee Brewers
Roster
Pitchers: 41 Greg Aquino; 36 Grant Balfour; 31 Dave Bush; 52 José Capellán; 39 Chris Capuano; 48 Francisco Cordero; 45 Elmer Dessens; 49 Yovani Gallardo; 45 Ray King; 40 Scott Linebrink; 73 Seth McClung; 43 Manny Parra; 15 Ben Sheets; 51 Brian Shouse; 50 Chris Spurling; 57 Mitch Stetter; 37 Jeff Suppan; 59 Derrick Turnbow; 46 Claudio Vargas; 12 Carlos Villanueva; 38 Matt Wise	Catchers: 33 Johnny Estrada; 26 Damian Miller; 11 Mike Rivera; Infielders: 8 Ryan Braun; 30 Craig Counsell; 28 Prince Fielder; 9 Tony Graffanino; 7 J. J. Hardy; 8 Vinny Rottino; 23 Rickie Weeks	Outfielders: 27 Joe Dillon; 18 Gabe Gross; 22 Tony Gwynn Jr.; 2 Bill Hall; 1 Corey Hart; 5 Geoff Jenkins; 24 Kevin Mench; 20 Laynce Nix; 52 Mel Stocker	Manager: 3 Ned Yost; Coaches: 35 Bill Castro (Bullpen); 16 Nick Leyva (third base); 36 Mike Maddux (pitching); 6 Ed Sedar (first base); 32 Jim Skaalen (hitting); 29 Dale Sveum (bench)

=== Game log ===
2007 game log (83–79)
April

#	Date	Opponent	Score	Win	Loss	Save	Attendance	Record
1	April 2	Dodgers	7–1	Sheets (1-0)	Lowe (0-1)		45,341	1-0
2	April 3	Dodgers	4–3	Shouse (1-0)	Wolf (0-1)	Cordero (1)	22,603	2-0
3	April 4	Dodgers	5–4	Schmidt (1-0)	Suppan (0-1)	Saito (1)	23,649	2-1
4	April 6	Cubs	9–3	Hill (1-0)	Bush (0-1)		41,758	2-2
5	April 7	Cubs	6–3	Zambrano (1-1)	Sheets (1-1)	Dempster (2)	41,282	2-3
6	April 8	Cubs	9–4	Capuano (1-0)	Miller (0-1)		28,019	3-3
7	April 9	@ Marlins	5–3	Sánchez (1-0)	Suppan (0-2)	Owens (1)	11,157	3-4
8	April 10	@ Marlins	3–2* (13)	Dessens (1-0)	Pinto (0-1)	Cordero (2)	10,883	4-4
9	April 11	@ Marlins	5–2	Bush (1-1)	Mitre (0-2)	Cordero (3)	11,379	5-4
--	April 13	@ Cardinals	Postponed (rain) Rescheduled July 28					5-4
10	April 14	@ Cardinals	3–2	Suppan (1-1)	Wells (1-2)	Cordero (4)	42,805	6-4
11	April 15	@ Cardinals	10–2	Looper (2-1)	Sheets (1-2)		44,153	6-5
12	April 16	@ Reds	10–6	Capuano (2-0)	Milton (0-2)		12,521	7-5
13	April 17	@ Reds	11–5	Stanton (1-0)	Shouse (1-1)		14,492	7-6
14	April 18	Pirates	7–3	Vargas (1-0)	Maholm (0-2)		22,331	8-6
15	April 19	Pirates	7–5	Suppan (2-2)	Duke (1-2)	Cordero (5)	17,386	9-6
16	April 20	Astros	6–5	White (1-0)	Wise (0-1)	Qualls (1)	41,522	9-7
17	April 21	Astros	6–4	Capuano (3-0)	Rodríguez (0-2)	Cordero (6)	41,209	10-7
18	April 22	Astros	4–3	Bush (2-1)	Oswalt (3-1)	Cordero (7)	31,985	11-7
19	April 23	@ Cubs	5–4 (12)	Villanueva (1-0)	Cherry (0-1)	Turnbow (1)	33,920	12-7
20	April 24	@ Cubs	4–1	Suppan (2-2)	Hill (3-1)	Cordero (8)	34,382	13-7
21	April 25	@ Cubs	9–3	Lilly (2-2)	Dessens (1-1)		38,581	13-8
22	April 27	@ Astros	4–1	Capuano (4-0)	Oswalt (3-2)	Cordero (9)	40,530	14-8
23	April 28	@ Astros	10–1	Sampson (3-1)	Bush (2-2)		41,004	14-9
24	April 29	@ Astros	3–1	Vargas (2-0)	Williams (0-4)	Cordero (10)	37,114	15-9
25	April 30	Cardinals	7–1	Suppan (4-2)	Wells (1-5)		20,191	16-9
*Game suspended, completed April 11

May

#	Date	Opponent	Score	Win	Loss	Save	Attendance	Record
26	May 1	Cardinals	12–2	Sheets (2-2)	Looper (3-2)		20,446	17–9
27	May 2	Cardinals	4–0	Villanueva (2-0)	Reyes (0-5)		23,299	18–9
28	May 3	Pirates	4–2	Gorzelanny (4-0)	Bush (2-3)	Torres (9)	15,602	18-10
29	May 4	Pirates	10–0	Vargas (3-0)	Maholm (1-4)		40,190	19-10
30	May 5	Pirates	6–3	Suppan (5-2)	Duke (1-3)	Cordero (11)	40,361	20-10
31	May 6	Pirates	6–4	Villanueva (3-0)	Grabow (0-1)	Cordero (12)	37,761	21-10
32	May 7	Nationals	3–0	Capuano (5-0)	Chico (2-4)	Cordero (13)	17,751	22-10
33	May 8	Nationals	6–4	Bush (3-3)	Simontacchi (0-1)	Cordero (14)	19,398	23-10
34	May 9	Nationals	3–1	Turnbow (1-0)	Bowie (0-2)	Cordero (15)	24,658	24-10
35	May 11	@ Mets	5–4	Sosa (2-0)	Suppan (5-3)	Wagner (9)	40,126	24-11
36	May 12	@ Mets	12–3	Sheets (3-2)	Pelfrey (0-5)		50,193	25-11
37	May 13	@ Mets	9–1	Pérez (4-3)	Capuano (5-1)		51,427	25-12
38	May 14	@ Phillies	8–6	Condrey (1-0)	Turnbow (1-1)	Myers (4)	29,183	25-13
39	May 15	@ Phillies	4–3	Myers (1-2)	Turnbow (1-2)		41,258	25-14
40	May 16	@ Phillies	6–2	Hamels (6-1)	Suppan (5-4)		42,713	25-15
41	May 17	@ Phillies	3–2	Sheets (4-2)	García (1-3)	Cordero (16)	31,553	26-15
42	May 18	Twins	8–1	Bonser (2-1)	Capuano (5-2)		44,759	26-16
43	May 19	Twins	5–2	Baker (1-0)	Bush (3-4)		44,427	26-17
44	May 20	Twins	6–5	Wise (1-1)	Reyes (0-1)	Cordero (17)	39,119	27-17
45	May 21	@ Dodgers	9–5	Suppan (6-4)	Tomko (1-5)		33,446	28-17
46	May 22	@ Dodgers	3–2	Wolf (6-3)	Sheets (4-3)	Saito (14)	33,552	28-18
47	May 23	@ Dodgers	5–1	Penny (6-1)	Capuano (5-3)		35,609	28-19
48	May 25	@ Padres	8–6	Maddux (4-3)	Bush (3-5)	Linebrink (1)	32,130	28-20
49	May 26	@ Padres	6–3	Germano (3-0)	Vargas (3-1)	Hoffman (14)	35,975	28-21
50	May 27	@ Padres	3–0	Peavy (7-1)	Suppan (6-5)	Hoffman (15)	41,246	28-22
51	May 28	Braves	2–1	James (5-4)	Capuano (5-4)	Wickman (8)	41,139	28-23
52	May 29	Braves	5–4	Sheets (5-3)	Moylan (1-1)	Cordero (18)	27,559	29-23
53	May 30	Braves	9–3	Hudson (6-3)	Turnbow (1-3)		32,758	29-24
54	May 31	Marlins	4–3	Villanueva (4-0)	Lindstrom (0-2)	Cordero (19)	17,704	30-24

June

#	Date	Opponent	Score	Win	Loss	Save	Attendance	Record
55	June 1	Marlins	8–5	Suppan (7-5)	Olsen (4–5)	Cordero (20)	30,852	31-24
56	June 2	Marlins	5–2	Lindstrom (1-2)	Capellán (0-1)	Gregg (7)	42,250	31-25
57	June 3	Marlins	3–0	Sheets (6-3)	Willis (7-4)	Cordero (21)	43,172	32-25
58	June 4	Cubs	7–2	Mármol (1-0)	Bush (3-6)		35,760	33-25
59	June 5	Cubs	7–5	Vargas (4-1)	Lilly (4-4)	Cordero (22)	38,535	33-26
60	June 6	Cubs	6–2	Zambrano (6-5)	Suppan (7-6)		40,186	33-27
61	June 8	@ Rangers	9–6	Tejeda (5-6)	Capuano (5-5)	Gagné (6)	29,562	33-28
62	June 9	@ Rangers	4–3	Francisco (1-0)	Cordero (0-1)		37,882	33-29
63	June 10	@ Rangers	9–6 (12)	Villanueva (5-0)	Eyre (2-3)	Vargas (1)	24,129	34-29
64	June 12	@ Tigers	4–0	Verlander (6-2)	Suppan (7-7)		33,555	34-30
65	June 13	@ Tigers	3–2	Spurling (1-0)	Rodney (1-5)	Cordero (23)	37,593	35-30
66	June 14	@ Tigers	6–5	Sheets (7-3)	Durbin (5-3)	Cordero (24)	41,390	36-30
67	June 15	@ Twins	11–3	Vargas (5-1)	Baker (1-2)	Shouse (1)	27,977	37-30
68	June 16	@ Twins	5–2	Bush (4-6)	Bonser (5-3)	Cordero (25)	37,117	38-30
69	June 17	@ Twins	10–9	Nathan (3-1)	Spurling (1-1)		31,624	38-31
70	June 18	Giants	5–4	Gallardo (1-0)	Lowry (6-6)	Cordero (26)	41,631	39-31
71	June 19	Giants	6–2	Sheets (8-3)	Lincecum (2-2)		35,238	40-31
72	June 20	Giants	7–5	Vargas (6-1)	Zito (6-8)	Cordero (27)	35,151	41-31
73	June 22	Royals	11–6	Suppan (8-7)	de la Rosa (4-9)		36,328	42-31
74	June 23	Royals	7–1	Bush (5-6)	Bannister (4-4)		41,721	43-31
75	June 24	Royals	4–3 (11)	Riske (1-2)	Capellán (0-2)	Gobble (1)	44,064	43-32
76	June 25	Astros	5–1	Sheets (9-3)	Jennings (1-2)		28,786	44-32
77	June 26	Astros	11–5	Wise (2-1)	Rodríguez (4-7)		30,713	45-32
78	June 27	Astros	6–3 (11)	Bush (6-6)	Borkowski (1-3)		31,862	46-32
79	June 29	@ Cubs	6–5	Howry (5-4)	Cordero (0-2)		41,909	46-33
80	June 30	@ Cubs	13–4	Sheets (10-3)	Marshall (4-3)		41,415	47-33

July

#	Date	Opponent	Score	Win	Loss	Save	Attendance	Record
81	July 1	@ Cubs	5–1	Marquis (6-4)	Bush (6-7)		41,486	47-34
82	July 2	@ Pirates	10–3	Villanueva (6-0)	Kuwata (0-1)		14,455	48-34
83	July 3	@ Pirates	6–2	Youman (1-0)	Gallardo (1-1)		25,416	48-35
84	July 4	@ Pirates	5–3	Snell (7-5)	Vargas (6-2)	Capps (8)	35,878	48-36
85	July 5	@ Pirates	6–3	Gorzelanny (9-4)	Sheets (10-4)	Capps (9)	15,134	48-37
86	July 6	@ Nationals	6–2	Bush (7-7)	Bacsik (2-6)		18,961	49-37
87	July 7	@ Nationals	5–4	Simontacchi (6-6)	Suppan (8-8)	C. Cordero (15)	24,774	49-38
88	July 8	@ Nationals	7–2	Redding (1-1)	Capuano (5-6)		20,637	49-39
89	July 13	Rockies	10–6	Francis (9-5)	Villanueva (6-1)		37,690	49-40
90	July 14	Rockies	2–1 (10)	Turnbow (2-3)	Hawkins (0-4)		42,559	50-40
91	July 15	Rockies	4–3	Wise (3-1)	Affeldt (4-2)	Cordero (28)	42,754	51-40
92	July 16	Diamondbacks	4–3	Bush (8-7)	Owings (5-5)	Cordero (29)	36,381	52-40
93	July 17	Diamondbacks	3–2	Vargas (7-2)	Petit (1-2)	Cordero (30)	32,540	53-40
94	July 18	Diamondbacks	5–2	Peña (4-2)	Balfour (0-1)	Valverde (28)	30,247	53-41
95	July 19	Diamondbacks	10–1	Gallardo (2-1)	Hernández (5-6)	Wise (1)	41,156	54-41
96	July 20	Giants	8–4	Lowry (10-7)	Villanueva (6-2)		43,121	54-42
97	July 21	Giants	8–0	Lincecum (5-2)	Bush (8-8)		43,180	54-43
98	July 22	Giants	7–5	Vargas (8-2)	Zito (7-10)	Cordero (31)	42,554	55-43
99	July 23	@ Reds	2–1 (12)	Burton (1-1)	Balfour (0-2)		23,489	55-44
100	July 24	@ Reds	5–3	Gallardo (3-1)	Belisle (5-7)	Cordero (32)	18,284	56-44
101	July 25	@ Reds	7–3	Lohse (6-12)	Suppan (8-9)	Weathers (20)	30,976	56-45
102	July 26	@ Reds	6–5 (10)	Burton (2-1)	Cordero (0-3)		24,170	56-46
103	July 27	@ Cardinals	12–2	Vargas (9-2)	Maroth (0-4)		45,137	57-46
104	July 28	@ Cardinals	7–6	Springer (5-1)	Cordero (0-4)		45,089	57-47
105	July 28	@ Cardinals	5–2	Reyes (1-10)	Capuano (5-7)	Isringhausen (20)	45,829	57-48
106	July 29	@ Cardinals	9–5	Franklin (4-0)	Turnbow (2-4)		44,854	57-49
107	July 31	Mets	4–2 (13)	Bush (9-8)	Sele (3-1)		41,790	58-49

August

#	Date	Opponent	Score	Win	Loss	Save	Attendance	Record
108	August 1	Mets	8–5	Pérez (10-7)	Vargas (9-3)	Wagner (25)	42,058	58-50
109	August 2	Mets	12–4	Lawrence (1-0)	Capuano (5-8)		41,704	58-51
110	August 3	Phillies	2–1	Gallardo (4-1)	Kendrick (5-2)	Cordero (33)	39,483	59-51
111	August 4	Phillies	6–5	Turnbow (3-4)	Gordon (1-2)	Cordero (34)	42,126	60-51
112	August 5	Phillies	8–6 (11)	Myers (2-3)	Parra (0-1)	Mesa (1)	43,716	60-52
113	August 6	@ Rockies	6–2	Fogg (6-7)	Vargas (9-4)		29,555	60-53
114	August 7	@ Rockies	11–4	Hirsh (5-7)	Capuano (5-9)		30,280	60-54
115	August 8	@ Rockies	19–4	Francis (13-5)	Gallardo (4-2)		26,613	60-55
116	August 10	@ Astros	5–4 (11)	Spurling (2-1)	Moehler (1-4)	Cordero (35)	40,211	61-55
117	August 11	@ Astros	7–4	Linebrink (4-3)	Lidge (3-2)	Cordero (36)	41,461	62-55
118	August 12	@ Astros	6–4	McLemore (2-0)	Villanueva (6-3)	Lidge (8)	43,578	62-56
119	August 14	Cardinals	12–4	Wells (6-13)	Capuano (5-10)		37,518	62-57
120	August 15	Cardinals	8–3	Piñeiro (3-2)	Gallardo (4-3)		33,404	62-58
121	August 16	Cardinals	8–0	Wainwright (11-9)	Bush (9-9)		36,062	62-59
122	August 17	Reds	8–3	Arroyo (6-13)	Suppan (8-10)		41,008	62-60
123	August 18	Reds	8–4	Vargas (10-4)	Ramírez (0-1)		43,087	63-60
124	August 19	Reds	7–6	Bray (2-0)	Linebrink (4-4)	Weathers (25)	42,398	63-61
125	August 20	@ Diamondbacks	9–0	Gallardo (5-3)	Davis (10-11)	Villanueva (1)	26,900	64-61
126	August 21	@ Diamondbacks	7–4	Bush (10-9)	Hernández (9-8)	Cordero (37)	27,784	65-61
127	August 22	@ Diamondbacks	3–2	Webb (14-8)	Suppan (8-11)	Valverde (37)	31,720	65-62
128	August 24	@ Giants	11–6	Lowry (14-5)	Capuano (5-11)		37,583	65-63
129	August 25	@ Giants	6–2	Correia (2-6)	Gallardo (5-4)	Wilson (2)	39,069	65-64
130	August 26	@ Giants	5–4	Kline (1-2)	Linebrink (4-5)	Hennessey (14)	40,997	65-65
131	August 28	@ Cubs	5–3	Hill (8-7)	Linebrink (4-6)	Dempster (22)	40,884	65-66
132	August 29	@ Cubs	6–1	Sheets (11-4)	Zambrano (14-11)		40,512	66-66
133	August 30	@ Cubs	5–4	Mármol (4-1)	Capuano (5-12)	Dempster (23)	40,790	66-67
134	August 31	Pirates	3–2	Gallardo (6-4)	Armas (2-5)	Cordero (38)	35,689	67-67

September

#	Date	Opponent	Score	Win	Loss	Save	Attendance	Record
135	September 1	Pirates	12–3	Bush (11-9)	Youman (3-5)		34,190	68-67
136	September 2	Pirates	7–4	Suppan (9-11)	Osoria (0-1)	Cordero (39)	39,339	69-67
137	September 3	Astros	9–7	Borkowski (4-3)	Aquino (0-1)	Qualls (4)	31,226	69-68
138	September 4	Astros	5–3	Villanueva (7-3)	Backe (0-1)	Cordero (40)	25,854	70-68
139	September 5	Astros	14–2	Gallardo (7-4)	Albers (4-7)		28,988	71-68
140	September 7	@ Reds	11–4	Arroyo (8-14)	Bush (11-10)		21,006	71-69
141	September 8	@ Reds	4–3	Turnbow (4-4)	Weathers (2-5)	Cordero (41)	22,758	72-69
142	September 9	@ Reds	10–5	Sheets (12-4)	Dumatrait (0-4)		21,534	73-69
143	September 10	@ Pirates	9–0	Armas (4-5)	Villanueva (7-4)		13,683	73-70
144	September 11	@ Pirates	6–1	Gallardo (8-4)	Bullington (0-2)		11,962	74-70
145	September 12	@ Pirates	7–4	Grabow (3-1)	Turnbow (4-5)	Capps (16)	10,566	74-71
146	September 14	Reds	6–5	Shearn (3-0)	Sheets (12-5)	Bray (1)	42,944	74-72
147	September 15	Reds	5–3	Suppan (10-11)	Saarloos (1-5)	Cordero (42)	40,710	75-72
148	September 16	Reds	5–2	Villanueva (8-4)	Belisle (8-9)	Cordero (43)	31,150	76-72
149	September 17	@ Astros	6–0	Gallardo (9-4)	Albers (4-9)		32,578	77-72
150	September 18	@ Astros	9–1	Vargas (11-4)	Paulino (0-1)		32,866	78-72
151	September 19	@ Astros	5–4 (10)	Lidge (5-2)	Wise (3-2)		36,981	78-73
152	September 20	@ Braves	3–1	Bennett (1-0)	Suppan (10-12)	Soriano (8)	26,595	78-74
153	September 21	@ Braves	4 -1	Linebrink (5-6)	T. Hudson (16-9)	F. Cordero (44)	34,401	79-74
154	September 22	@ Braves	4–3 (11)	Devine (1-0)	McClung (0-1)		42,378	79-75
155	September 23	@ Braves	7–4	Acosta (1-1)	Vargas (11-5)	Soriano (9)	44,088	79-76
156	September 24	Cardinals	13–5	Bush (12-10)	Wainwright (13-12)		40,908	80-76
157	September 25	Cardinals	9–1	Suppan (11-12)	Looper (12-12)		32,329	81-76
158	September 26	Cardinals	7–3	Thompson (8-6)	Villanueva (8-5)		32,411	81-77
159	September 27	Padres	9–5	Thatcher (2-1)	Gallardo (9-5)		34,918	81-78
160	September 28	Padres	6–3	Maddux (14-11)	Vargas (11-6)	Hoffman (42)	38,135	81-79
161	September 29	Padres	4–3 (11)	Stetter (1-0)	Thatcher (2-2)		40,946	82-79
162	September 30	Padres	11–6	Suppan (12-12)	Tomko (4-12)		42,415	83-79

- Brewers Win
- Brewers loss
- Game Postponed

== Player stats ==
=== Batting ===
==== Starters by position ====
Note: Pos = Position; G = Games played; AB = At bats; H = Hits; Avg. = Batting average; HR = Home runs; RBI = Runs batted in

Pos	Player	G	AB	H	Avg.	HR	RBI
C	Johnny Estrada	120	442	123	.278	10	54
1B	Prince Fielder	158	573	165	.288	50	119
2B	Rickie Weeks Jr.	118	409	96	.235	16	36
SS	J.J. Hardy	151	592	164	.277	26	80
3B	Ryan Braun	113	451	146	.324	34	97
LF	Geoff Jenkins	132	420	107	.255	21	64
CF	Bill Hall	136	452	115	.254	14	63
RF	Corey Hart	140	505	149	.295	24	81

==== Other batters ====
Note: G = Games played; AB = At bats; H = Hits; Avg. = Batting average; HR = Home runs; RBI = Runs batted in

Player	G	AB	H	Avg.	HR	RBI
Kevin Mench	101	288	77	.267	8	37
Craig Counsell	122	282	62	.220	3	24
Tony Graffanino	86	231	55	.238	9	30
Damian Miller	58	186	44	.237	4	24
Gabe Gross	93	183	43	.235	7	24
Tony Gwynn Jr.	69	123	32	.260	0	10
Joe Dillon	39	76	26	.342	0	10
Mike Rivera	11	13	3	.231	2	3
Laynce Nix	10	12	0	.000	0	0
Vinny Rottino	8	9	2	.222	0	3
Mel Stocker	9	3	0	.000	0	0

=== Pitching ===
==== Starting pitchers ====
Note: G = Games pitched; IP = Innings pitched; W = Wins; L = Losses; ERA = Earned run average; SO = Strikeouts

Player	G	IP	W	L	ERA	SO
Jeff Suppan	34	206.2	12	12	4.62	114
Dave Bush	33	186.1	12	10	5.12	134
Chris Capuano	29	150.0	5	12	5.10	132
Ben Sheets	24	141.1	12	5	3.82	106
Claudio Vargas	29	134.1	11	6	5.09	107
Yovani Gallardo	20	110.1	9	5	3.67	101

==== Other pitchers ====
Note: G = Games pitched; IP = Innings pitched; W = Wins; L = Losses; ERA = Earned run average; SO = Strikeouts

Player	G	IP	W	L	ERA	SO
Manny Parra	9	26.1	0	1	3.76	26

==== Relief pitchers ====
Note: G = Games pitched; W = Wins; L = Losses; SV = Saves; ERA = Earned run average; SO = Strikeouts

Player	G	W	L	SV	ERA	SO
Francisco Cordero	60	0	4	44	2.98	86
Derrick Turnbow	77	4	5	1	4.63	84
Brian Shouse	73	1	1	1	3.02	32
Carlos Villanueva	59	8	5	1	3.94	99
Matt Wise	56	3	2	1	4.19	43
Chris Spurling	49	2	1	0	4.68	28
Scott Linebrink	27	2	3	0	3.55	25
Greg Aquino	15	0	1	0	4.50	12
Seth McClung	14	0	1	0	3.75	11
Elmer Dessens	12	1	1	0	6.60	12
Ray King	12	0	0	0	6.00	7
José Capellán	7	0	2	0	4.50	8
Mitch Stetter	6	1	0	0	3.60	4
Grant Balfour	3	0	2	0	20.25	3

== Farm system ==
The Brewers' farm system consisted of six minor league affiliates in 2007.

Level	Team	League	Manager
Triple-A	Nashville Sounds	Pacific Coast League	Frank Kremblas
Double-A	Huntsville Stars	Southern League	Don Money
Class A-Advanced	Brevard County Manatees	Florida State League	John Tamargo
Class A	West Virginia Power	South Atlantic League	Mike Guerrero
Rookie	Helena Brewers	Pioneer League	Jeff Isom
Rookie	AZL Brewers	Arizona League	Charlie Greene
