= John Van Benschoten =

American baseball player (born 1980)

- Pitcher
- Born: April 14, 1980 (age 46); San Diego, California, U.S.
- Batted: Right Threw: Right

MLB debut
- August 18, 2004, for the Pittsburgh Pirates

Last MLB appearance
- July 26, 2008, for the Pittsburgh Pirates

MLB statistics
- Win–loss record: 2–13
- Earned run average: 9.20
- Strikeouts: 65
- Stats at Baseball Reference

Teams
- Pittsburgh Pirates (2004, 2007–2008)

John Wesley Van Benschoten (born April 14, 1980) is an American former professional baseball pitcher who played for the Pittsburgh Pirates of Major League Baseball (MLB) in 2004 and again from 2007 to 2008.

== Personal ==
He grew up in Milford, Ohio, a suburb of Cincinnati, where he was a two-sport athlete at Milford High School. He has an older sister, Caroline, and a younger sister, Lyndsay.

== Playing career ==
=== College ===
Van Benschoten was a power-hitting star at Kent State University, leading all of Division I in home runs his junior year with 31. He was named the Mid-American Conference Player of the Year as a first baseman in 2001 and, as of 2015, his 31 home runs and 221 total bases stood as single-season conference records. He also worked as the team's closer, however, and the Pittsburgh Pirates thought that he had more potential as a pitcher than as a hitter. They made him the eighth overall selection of the 2001 Major League Baseball draft, and announced that he would be a pitcher.

=== Pittsburgh Pirates ===
Van Benschoten performed well as a prospect. He pitched a scoreless inning in the 2003 All-Star Futures Game while a member of the Altoona Curve, and Baseball America named him the top prospect in the Pirates system in both 2003 and 2004.

Van Benschoten made his major league debut on August 18, 2004, in a 6–3 loss against the Arizona Diamondbacks. Scheduled starter Kip Wells had complained of elbow pain before the game, so the Pirates called up Van Benschoten to take his place, designating reliever Willis Roberts for assignment to create roster space. Van Benschoten went on to pitch in six games for the Pirates, five of them starts. He compiled a 6.91 ERA in 28 2/3 innings pitched, winning one game and losing three. He also hit his first major league home run, against Casey Fossum.

The Pirates benched Van Benschoten for medical reasons on September 18, 2004, citing "shoulder fatigue" in his right arm. He did not pitch again that year, and in November, he had surgery to repair tears to the glenoid labrum and rotator cuff of his left arm. Those injuries did not affect his pitching, presenting a problem only as a batter, and Van Benschoten participated in the team's minicamp in January 2005. There, he began experiencing a pinching sensation in the shoulder of his right arm. He ultimately had surgery to repair a tear to the labrum of his right shoulder as well, and missed the entire 2005 season.

Van Benschoten returned to play in August 2006, but made only 5 starts (split between the Bradenton Pirates, Altoona Curve, and Indianapolis Indians) before a further arm injury ended his season.

Van Benschoten started the 2007 season at Indianapolis. He made his first start with the Pirates in the 2007 season on June 16 as a starter against the White Sox. Van Benschoten would go back to Indianapolis and be recalled later during the season only to finish the season with no wins and seven losses.

Van Benschoten would likewise start the 2008 season with the Indianapolis Indians and remain on the inactive roster for the Pirates. After posting a 4–0 record and a 1.88 ERA with the Indians, he was called up by the Pirates on April 27 to be on the active roster. He currently holds the all-time major league record for highest career ERA with at least 75 innings pitched. He became a free agent at the end of the season.

=== Chicago White Sox ===
In 2009, Van Benschoten signed a minor league contract with the Chicago White Sox, who assigned him to the Triple-A Charlotte Knights.

=== New York Yankees ===
Prior to the 2010 season, Van Benschoten signed a minor league contract with the New York Yankees. He pitched for the Double-A Trenton Thunder and Triple-A Scranton/Wilkes-Barre Yankees.

=== San Diego Padres ===
After beginning the 2011 season playing independent baseball, Van Benschoten signed a minor league contract with the San Diego Padres on July 20.
