= Josh Sharpless =

American baseball player (born 1981)

- Pitcher
- Born: January 26, 1981 (age 45); Beaver, Pennsylvania, U.S.
- Batted: Right Threw: Right

MLB debut
- August 1, 2006, for the Pittsburgh Pirates

Last MLB appearance
- June 10, 2007, for the Pittsburgh Pirates

MLB statistics
- Win–loss record: 0–1
- Earned run average: 4.41
- Strikeouts: 8
- Stats at Baseball Reference

Teams
- Pittsburgh Pirates (2006–2007)

Joshua David Sharpless (born January 26, 1981) is an American former professional baseball right-handed relief pitcher. He played in Major League Baseball (MLB) for the Pittsburgh Pirates.

== Biography ==
Sharpless grew up in the greater Pittsburgh area, attending Freedom Area Senior High School in Freedom, Pennsylvania. Drafted in the 24th round of the 2003 Major League Baseball draft out of Allegheny College, he progressed through the Pirates minor league system in three years.

He reached the majors on August 1, 2006, when trade-deadline moves left openings in the major league roster. He made his first appearance on August 2, 2006.

Sharpless continued to live in the Pittsburgh area year-round while playing for the Pirates.

After being released by the Pirates on March 31, 2008, Sharpless signed a minor league contract with the San Francisco Giants on April 10, 2008. After becoming a free agent following the 2008 season, Sharpless signed with the York Revolution of the Atlantic League for the 2009 season.

He continues to live in the Pittsburgh area and gives pitching lessons to area high schoolers.
