= Jonah Bayliss =

American baseball player (born 1980)

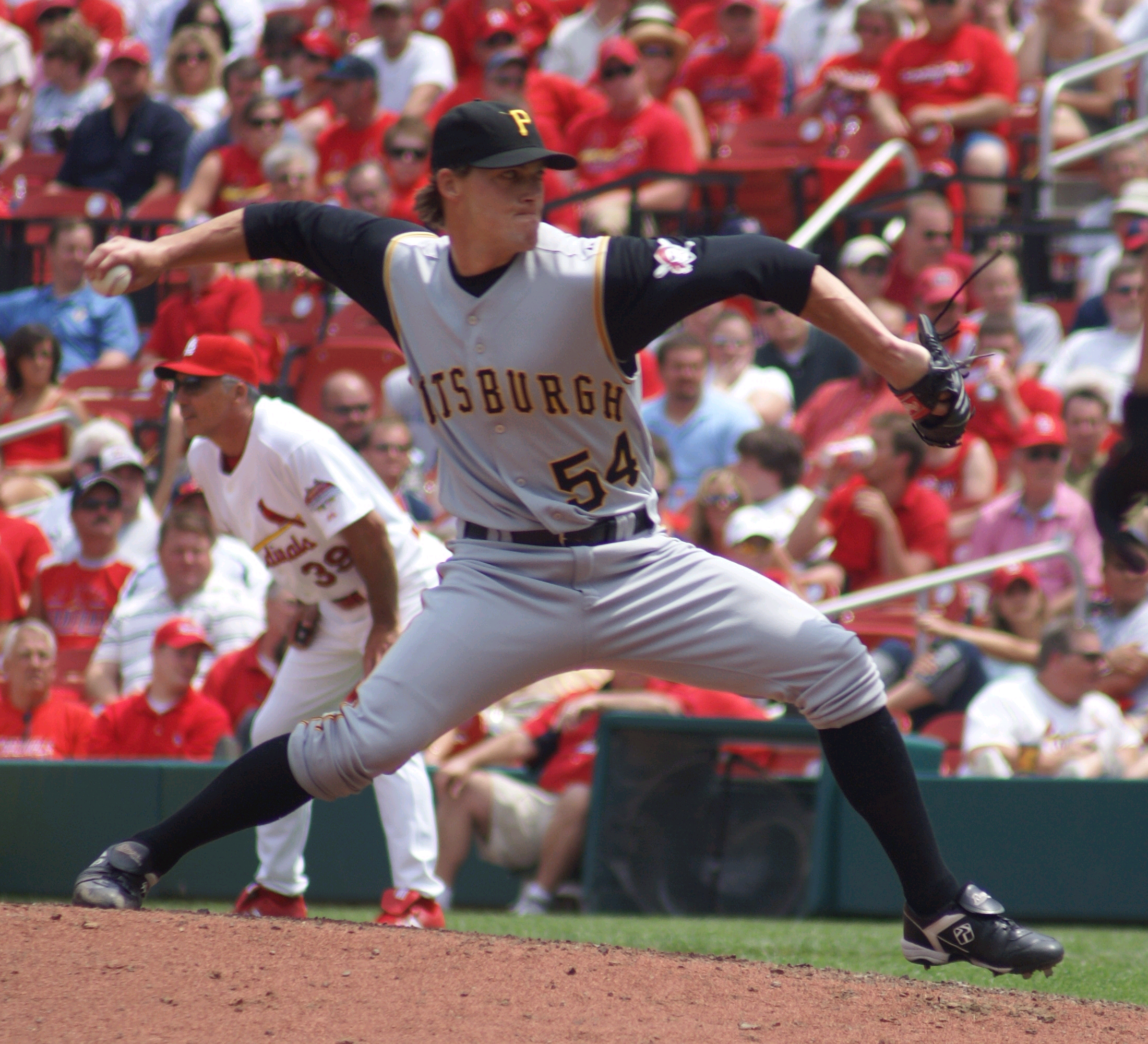
- Relief pitcher
- Born: August 13, 1980 (age 45); North Adams, Massachusetts, U.S.
- Batted: Right Threw: Right

Professional debut
- MLB: June 21, 2005, for the Kansas City Royals
- NPB: 2009, for the Saitama Seibu Lions

Last appearance
- MLB: August 3, 2007, for the Pittsburgh Pirates
- NPB: 2009, for the Saitama Seibu Lions

MLB statistics
- Win–loss record: 5–4
- Earned run average: 6.75
- Strikeouts: 54
- Stats at Baseball Reference

Teams
- Kansas City Royals (2005); Pittsburgh Pirates (2006–2007); Saitama Seibu Lions (2009)

Jonah James Bayliss (born August 13, 1980) is an American former professional baseball relief pitcher. He is an alumnus of Trinity College in Hartford, Connecticut, and Lawrence Academy at Groton in Groton, Massachusetts.

== Career ==
=== Kansas City Royals ===
Bayliss was originally a seventh-round draft pick of the Kansas City Royals in 2002, and he made his major league debut with that team on June 21, 2005. Bayliss pitched 11 2/3 innings in relief for the Royals that year.

=== Pittsburgh Pirates ===
He and minor league reliever Chad Blackwell were traded to the Pittsburgh Pirates for starting pitcher Mark Redman on December 7.

On March 28, 2008, the Pittsburgh Pirates designated Bayliss for assignment. According to Pirates manager Neal Huntington, "Bayliss is the type of player that teams should be looking for on the waiver wire. He has good stuff, but has struggled with control. If he can figure that out, he can be a very solid reliever."

=== Toronto Blue Jays ===
On June 19, 2008, Bayliss was traded by the Pirates to the Toronto Blue Jays. He became a free agent at the end of the season and re-signed with Toronto in February 2009.

Bayliss did not make the Toronto Blue Jays 40-man roster and started the 2009 season with the Triple A Las Vegas 51s.

=== Saitma Seibu Lions ===
On July 28, 2009, Bayliss was released by the Blue Jays so that he could sign with The Saitama Seibu Lions of the Japan Pacific League.

=== Houston Astros ===
On February 1, 2010, Bayliss was re-signed as a free agent by the Blue Jays. but he was released on March 31 and subsequently signed by the Houston Astros. He played for Triple-A Round Rock in 2010, and posted a 3.58 ERA.

=== Tampa Bay Rays ===
On December 15, 2010, Bayliss got out of Free Agency and the Tampa Bay Rays inked him to a minor league deal. The Rays released him on March 24, 2011.

=== Atlantic League ===
He joined the Atlantic League of Professional Baseball with the Lancaster Barnstormers for 2011 season and the Bridgeport Bluefish for 2012.
