= Mel Stocker =

American baseball player (born 1980)

- Outfielder
- Born: August 15, 1980 (age 46); Tucson, Arizona, U.S.
- Batted: Left Threw: Right

MLB debut
- September 1, 2007, for the Milwaukee Brewers

Last MLB appearance
- September 30, 2007, for the Milwaukee Brewers

MLB statistics
- Batting average: .000
- Home runs: 0
- Runs batted in: 0
- Stolen bases: 4
- Stats at Baseball Reference

Teams
- Milwaukee Brewers (2007)

Myreon Romel "Mel" Stocker (born August 15, 1980) is an American former Major League Baseball outfielder who played for the Milwaukee Brewers in 2007.

== Biography ==
Mel Stocker attended Arizona State University and was then drafted by the Kansas City Royals in the 16th round (475th overall) of the 2001 Major League Baseball draft.

Stocker spent 5 seasons in the Royals minor league system, never passing Double-A ball. In 2006, he went to play for the Long Island Ducks of the Atlantic League, which is not affiliated with Major League Baseball. For the Ducks in 2006, he played in 110 games, batted .303 with 3 home runs and 39 RBI. The highlight of his season with the Ducks was stealing 56 bases in 64 attempts.

Following the 2006 season, Stocker went back to affiliated baseball, when he signed a minor league contract with the Milwaukee Brewers for the 2007 season. He began the season with the Double-A Huntsville Stars and played there until he had his contract purchased by the major league club on September 1, 2007, despite dismal stats in Double-A (.255 batting average and 0 home runs).

Stocker recorded his first career stolen base on September 14, 2007, against the Cincinnati Reds. In 2008, Stocker began the season with the Triple-A Nashville Sounds. In July 2008, Stocker was transferred to the Brevard County Manatees of the Florida State League. He became a free agent at the end of the season and signed with the Seattle Mariners in November. In 2009, he played for the Mariners Double-A West Tenn Diamond Jaxx, and at the end of the season he once again became a free agent.
