= Vinny Rottino =

American baseball player (born 1980)

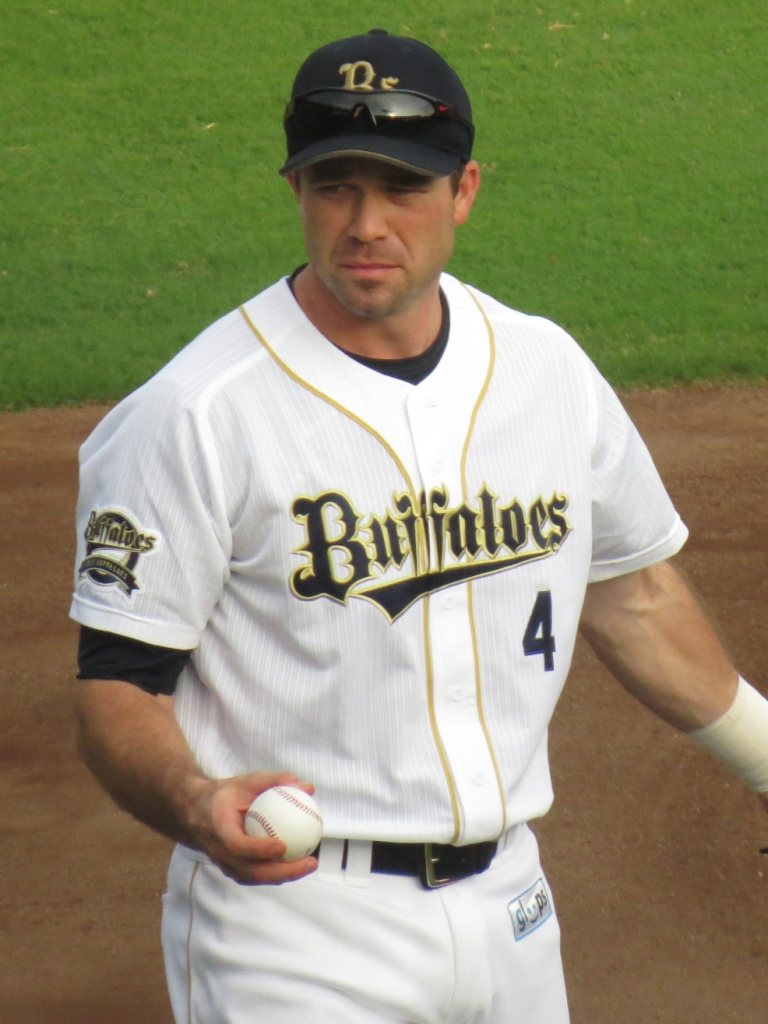
- Rottino with the Orix Buffaloes in 2013
- Utility player
- Born: April 7, 1980 (age 46); Racine, Wisconsin, U.S.
- Batted: Right Threw: Right

Professional debut
- MLB: September 1, 2006, for the Milwaukee Brewers
- NPB: May 2, 2013, for the Orix Buffaloes
- KBO: March 29, 2014, for the Nexen Heroes

Last appearance
- MLB: October 2, 2012, for the Cleveland Indians
- NPB: August 31, 2013, for the Orix Buffaloes
- KBO: October 10, 2014, for the Nexen Heroes

MLB statistics
- Batting average: .165
- Home runs: 3
- Runs batted in: 11

NPB statistics
- Batting average: .206
- Home runs: 4
- Runs batted in: 8

KBO statistics
- Batting average: .306
- Home runs: 2
- Runs batted in: 22
- Stats at Baseball Reference

Teams
- Milwaukee Brewers (2006–2008); Florida Marlins (2011); New York Mets (2012); Cleveland Indians (2012); Orix Buffaloes (2013); Nexen Heroes (2014)

Vincent Antonio Rottino (born April 7, 1980) is an American former professional baseball utility player and current television analyst for FanDuel Sports Network Wisconsin, covering the Milwaukee Brewers. He played in Major League Baseball (MLB) for the Milwaukee Brewers, Florida Marlins, New York Mets, and Cleveland Indians. He also played in Nippon Professional Baseball (NPB) for the Orix Buffaloes and in the KBO League for the Nexen Heroes. He played positions including catcher, first base, third base, and the outfield.

He graduated from St. Catherine's High School in Racine, and then went to the University of Wisconsin–La Crosse.

== Playing career ==
=== Milwaukee Brewers ===
Rottino originally signed with the Milwaukee Brewers as an undrafted free agent on February 3, 2003. In his fourth year with the Brewers organization, he made his major league debut as a September call up in 2006. He played in nine games and batted .214.

Rottino began the 2007 season in Triple-A with the Nashville Sounds. He spent nearly the entire season there before being recalled by Milwaukee on September 1. On September 29, 2007, Rottino hit a walk-off single in the bottom of the 11th inning to beat the San Diego Padres 4–3 and clinch the first winning season for the Brewers since 1992.

He repeated most of his previous season's fashion in 2008, playing most of the season at Triple-A, then receiving a call-up in September.

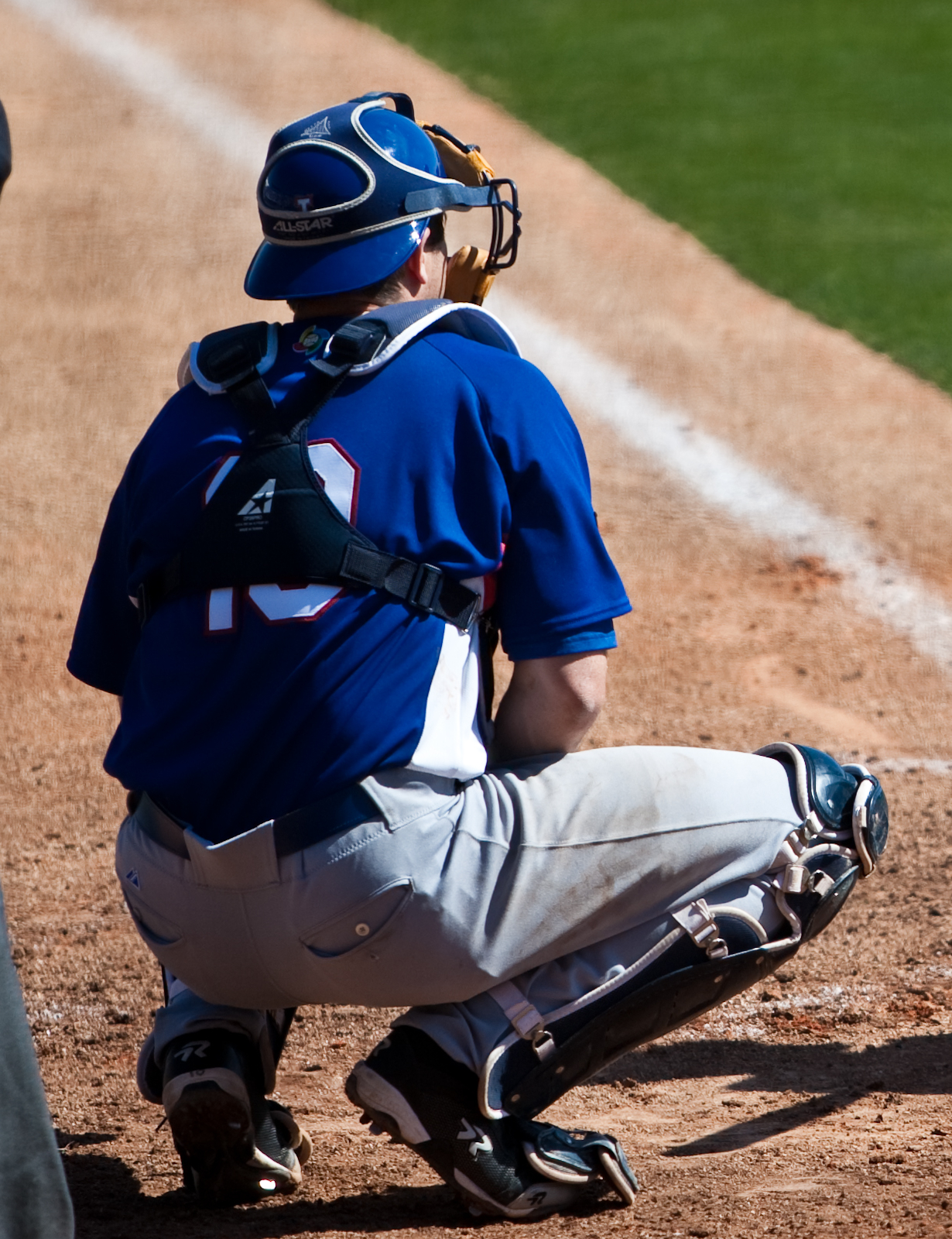
Rottino playing for Italy national team on March 3, 2009, before World Baseball Classic

Rottino was the starting catcher for Team Italy in the 2009 World Baseball Classic.

In 2009, Rottino accepted an assignment to Double-A Huntsville.

=== Los Angeles Dodgers ===
On July 31, 2009, Rottino was traded by the Brewers to the Los Angeles Dodgers in exchange for Claudio Vargas.

=== Florida Marlins ===
On February 8, 2010, Rottino signed a minor league contract with the Florida Marlins. In 121 appearances split between the Double-A Jacksonville Suns and Triple-A New Orleans Zephyrs, he batted .308/.390/.438 with eight home runs, 70 RBI, and 23 stolen bases. Rottino elected free agency following the season on November 6.

On November 24, 2010, Rottino re-signed with the Marlins organization on a minor league contract. On September 6, 2011, the Marlins selected Rottino's contract, adding him to their active roster. In 8 games for Miami, his first time in the majors since 2008, he went 2-for-12 (.167) with 2 walks. On October 5, Rottino was removed from the 40-man roster and sent outright to Triple-A New Orleans.

=== New York Mets ===
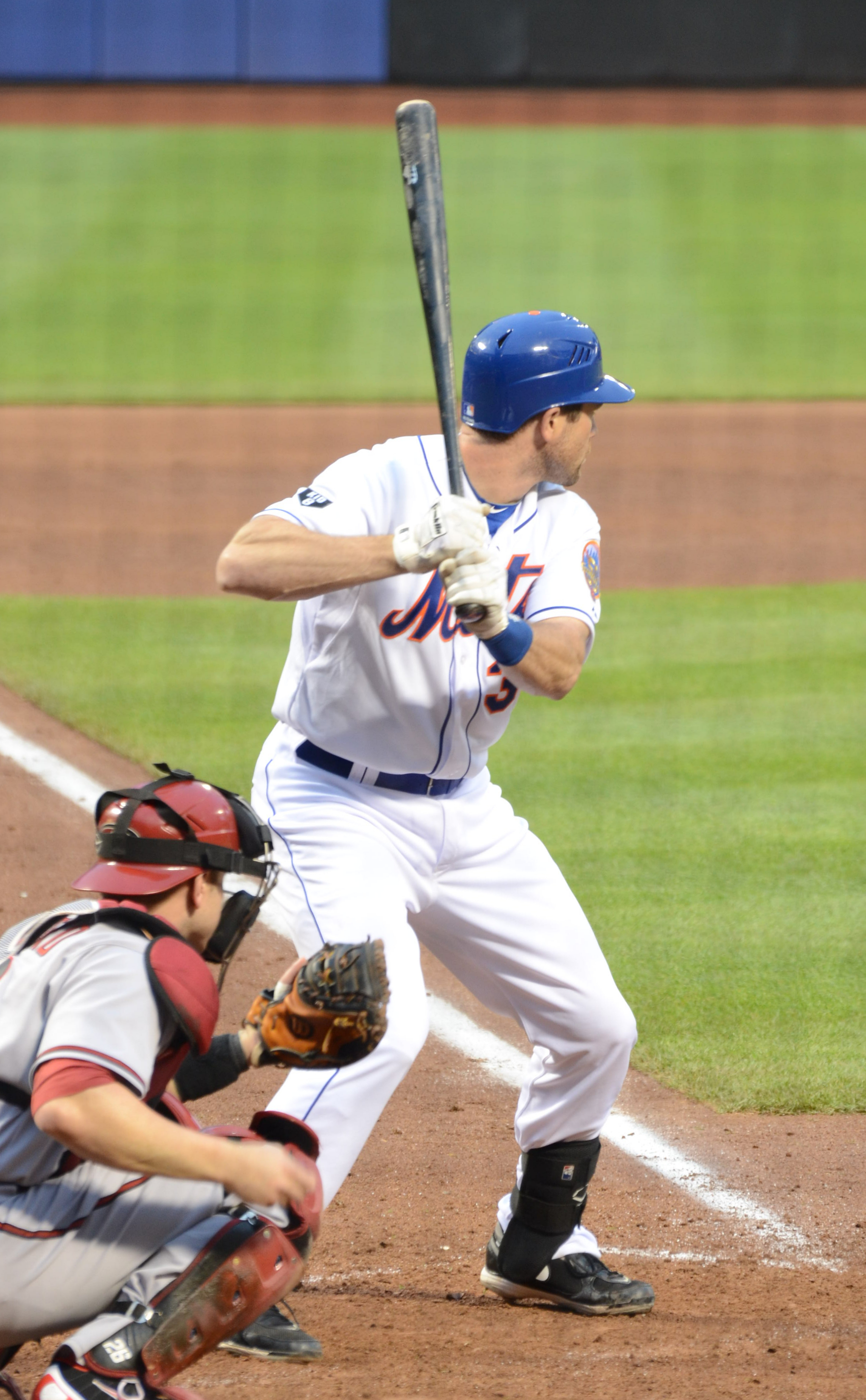
Rottino playing for the New York Mets in 2012

On November 16, 2011, Rottino signed a minor league contract with the New York Mets. On May 4, 2012, Rottino got called up to the Mets after Chris Schwinden was sent down to Triple-A Buffalo. On May 26, Rottino hit his first career home run against the San Diego Padres' Clayton Richard. He hit another home run on May 28, against Cole Hamels of the Philadelphia Phillies. In 18 total games for the Mets, Rottino went 6-for-33 (.182) with two home runs, five RBI, and three stolen bases. On June 25, Rottino was designated for assignment to make room on the Mets' roster for Justin Hampson.

=== Cleveland Indians ===
On June 27, 2012, Rottino was claimed off waivers by the Cleveland Indians. On August 1, Rottino was recalled by the Indians when Travis Hafner was placed on paternity leave. He had been hitting .299 with four home runs and 32 RBI with the Triple-A Columbus Clippers. In 18 games for Cleveland, Rottino went 3-for-27 (.107) with one home run, two RBI, and one stolen base. On October 31, Rottino was removed from the 40-man roster and sent outright to Columbus. However, he subsequently rejected the assignment and elected free agency the next day.

=== Orix Buffaloes ===
On November 30, 2012, Rottino signed a one-year $350,000 contract with the Orix Buffaloes of Nippon Professional Baseball. In 37 games for the Buffaloes in 2013, he hit .206/.297/.381 with four home runs and eight RBI.

=== Nexen Heroes ===
On December 11, 2013, Rottino signed a one-year, $300,000 contract with the Nexen Heroes of the KBO League. In 79 games for the Heroes in 2014, Rottino batted .306/.389/.417 with two home runs and 22 RBI.

=== Miami Marlins ===
On December 24, 2014, Rottino signed a minor league contract with the Miami Marlins. He made 127 appearances for the Triple-A New Orleans Zephyrs, slashing .266/.346/.390 with 10 home runs and 51 RBI. Rottino elected free agency following the season on November 6, 2015.

=== Chicago White Sox ===
On February 3, 2016, Rottino signed a minor league contract with the Chicago White Sox organization. In 78 appearances for the Triple-A Charlotte Knights, he batted .208/.321/.279 with three home runs and 25 RBI. On September 9, it was announced that Rottino had decided to retire from professional baseball.

== Post-playing career ==
Rottino currently is a part of the Milwaukee Brewers television team for Brewers.tv, alternating as a pre-game/post-game analyst during home games, and as a color commentator on game broadcasts in place of Bill Schroeder on road trips.

== Personal life ==
Rottino resides in Racine, Wisconsin with his wife, Maggie Rottino, and their three daughters.
