= Claudio Vargas =

Dominican baseball player (born 1978)

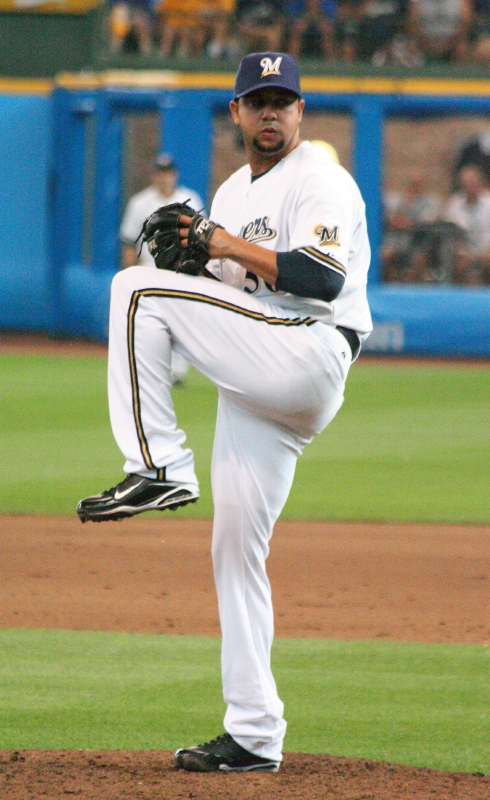
- Vargas with the Milwaukee Brewers in 2009
- Pitcher
- Born: June 19, 1978 (age 47); Santa Cruz de Mao, Dominican Republic
- Batted: Right Threw: Right

MLB debut
- April 26, 2003, for the Montreal Expos

Last MLB appearance
- May 26, 2010, for the Milwaukee Brewers

MLB statistics
- Win–loss record: 48–40
- Earned run average: 4.83
- Strikeouts: 544
- Stats at Baseball Reference

Teams
- Montreal Expos / Washington Nationals (2003–2005); Arizona Diamondbacks (2005–2006); Milwaukee Brewers (2007); New York Mets (2008); Los Angeles Dodgers (2009); Milwaukee Brewers (2009–2010)

Claudio Vargas Almonte (born June 19, 1978) is a Dominican former professional baseball pitcher. He has previously played for the Montreal Expos/Washington Nationals, Arizona Diamondbacks, Milwaukee Brewers, New York Mets, and Los Angeles Dodgers. He has both started games and also pitched in both middle and long relief during his career.

His nickname among Brewers fans was the "Magic Man" because of his ability to get himself into bases loaded situations and escape with little or no damage.

== Minor league career ==
Vargas was signed as an undrafted free agent by the Florida Marlins in 1995 at age 16 and made his professional debut with the Marlins Dominican Summer League team, where he played in 1996 and 1997. In 1998 he pitched for the rookie league Gulf Coast Marlins and the Class-A Brevard County Manatees. He continued to pitch in the Marlins system through 2001 with the Kane County Cougars, Portland Sea Dogs and Calgary Cannons.

On July 11, 2002, he was traded by the Marlins (along with Wilton Guerrero, Cliff Floyd and cash) to the Montreal Expos for Donald Levinski, Justin Wayne, Carl Pavano, Mike Mordecai and Graeme Lloyd. In the Expos minor league system he pitched for the Harrisburg Senators and Edmonton Trappers.

== Major league career ==
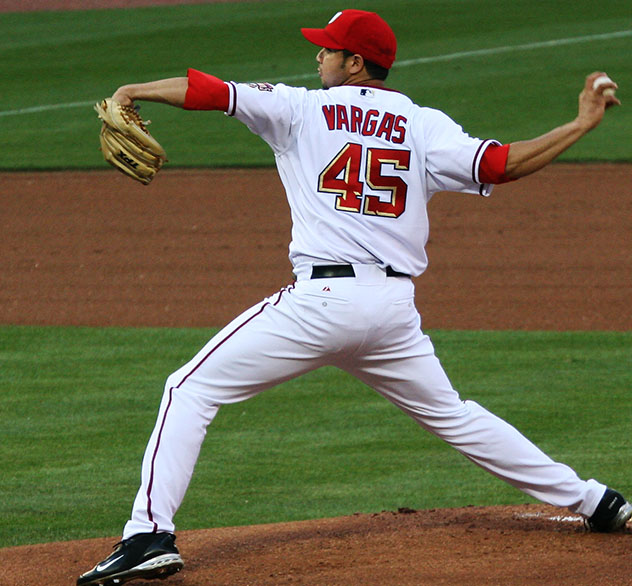
Vargas pitching for the Nationals in 2005.

Vargas made his Major League debut on April 26, 2003, against the Houston Astros and recorded his first victory in a 6–3 win over the San Francisco Giants. He made 23 appearances (20 starts) for the Expos in 2003, with a 6–8 record and 4.34 ERA. In 2004, he appeared in 45 games (only 14 starts) and went 5–5 with a 5.25 ERA.

He signed as a free agent with the Washington Nationals before the 2005 season but the Nationals designated him for assignment after he went 0–3 with a 17.55 ERA at the start of the season. He was claimed off waivers by the Arizona Diamondbacks on June 3 and went 9–6 with a 4.81 ERA in 21 games (19 starts) for the Diamondbacks the rest of the season. He remained with the team for the 2006 season and turned in a solid season, 12–10, 4.83 ERA in 30 starts.

In November 2006, Vargas was traded to the Milwaukee Brewers along with pitcher Greg Aquino and catcher Johnny Estrada, for outfielder Dave Krynzel, and pitchers Dana Eveland and Doug Davis.

In March 2008, Vargas was released by the Brewers after struggling in 2007 with an 11–6 record and 5.09 ERA in 23 starts (29 total appearances). In April, he was signed to a minor league deal with the New York Mets. In his Mets debut on May 14, 2008, he received a standing ovation from the Shea Stadium crowd, giving up only 2 earned runs and 3 hits, despite the loss to the Washington Nationals. Vargas was designated for assignment in June and spent the rest of the season in the minors.

In January 2009, Vargas signed a 1-year deal with the Los Angeles Dodgers. He was expected to compete for a spot in the starting rotation during spring training, however, he suffered an arm injury and began the season on the 60-day disabled list. After spending the first three months of the season on the DL, he was activated by the Dodgers on July 3.

Vargas pitched in middle relief for the Dodgers, until he was traded on July 31 to the Milwaukee Brewers for Minor League catcher Vinny Rottino.

Vargas pitched in 28 games for the Brewers in 2009, and was 1–0 with a 1.78 ERA. He re-signed with the Brewers for the 2010 season, appearing in 17 games with a 7.32 ERA. On May 29, 2010, Vargas was designated for assignment and was released on June 4.

On June 16 he re-signed with the Los Angeles Dodgers and was assigned to the Triple-A Albuquerque Isotopes. He was released on August 16.

He announced his retirement on June 13, 2011, after he had signed a minor league contract with the Colorado Rockies in the off-season. He had an 11.08 ERA in 26 innings with the Triple-A Colorado Springs Sky Sox that season.

Despite his retirement, Vargas pitched as the closer for the Mexican League's Vaqueros Laguna in 2012. Furthermore, the Milwaukee Brewers signed him to a minor league contract in order to fill out the starting rotation at Triple-A Nashville.

He signed a minor league contract, containing a spring training invitation, with the Toronto Blue Jays in December 2012. He started the 2013 season on the roster of the Triple-A Buffalo Bisons. He was released on July 22 after posting a 5–7 record and an ERA of 5.86 with the Bisons.

He returned to the Laguna in the Mexican League for the 2014 season. Making 11 starts across 62 innings going 3-3 with a 4.21 ERA and 40 strikeouts.
