= Shane Youman =

American baseball player (born 1979)

- Pitcher
- Born: October 11, 1979 (age 46); New Iberia, Louisiana, U.S.
- Batted: Left Threw: Left

Professional debut
- MLB: September 10, 2006, for the Pittsburgh Pirates
- CPBL: August 21, 2011, for the Lamigo Monkeys
- KBO: April 11, 2012, for the Lotte Giants

Last appearance
- MLB: September 30, 2007, for the Pittsburgh Pirates
- CPBL: October 2, 2011, for the Lotte Giants
- KBO: July 11, 2015, for the Hanwha Eagles

MLB statistics
- Win–loss record: 3–7
- Earned run average: 5.13
- Strikeouts: 34

CPBL statistics
- Win–loss record: 5–1
- Earned run average: 2.15
- Strikeouts: 41

KBO statistics
- Win–loss record: 42–27
- Earned run average: 3.99
- Strikeouts: 423
- Stats at Baseball Reference

Teams
- Pittsburgh Pirates (2006–2007); Lamigo Monkeys (2011); Lotte Giants (2012–2014); Hanwha Eagles (2014–2015); Lamigo Monkeys (2016)

Shane Demond Youman (born October 11, 1979) is an American former professional baseball pitcher. He played parts of two seasons in Major League Baseball (MLB) for the Pittsburgh Pirates. He also played in the KBO League for the Lotte Giants and Hanwha Eagles, and in the Chinese Professional Baseball League (CPBL) for the Lamigo Monkeys.

Youman stands at 6' 4", and weighs 220 pounds. Youman is a classic "crafty" left-handed pitcher, with a fastball in the 84-88 MPH range and a hard slider, as well as a changeup.

== Career ==
He attended Louisiana State. He made his major league debut for the Pittsburgh Pirates on September 10, 2006. He got his first career win on July 3, 2007, against the Milwaukee Brewers.

Youman was claimed off waivers by the Philadelphia Phillies on November 28, 2007. On March 19, 2008, he was sent outright to the minors, but was released in early June. Shortly thereafter, Youman signed with the Lancaster Barnstormers of the Atlantic League, where he made his debut on June 16, 2008. He remained in the Atlantic League for parts of four seasons, pitching for five teams.

On August 10, 2011, after pitching 13 games that season for the Long Island Ducks, Youman's contract was purchased by the Lamigo Monkeys in Taiwan. In January 2012, with the help of the Global Scouting Bureau, Youman signed a one-year contract to pitch for the Lotte Giants of the Korea Professional Baseball League.

New Iberia Senior High School held a ceremony to retire Youman's number on March 18, 2017. In front of a crowd that included Youman's family, friends, and former coaches, the school presented him with a framed jersey.
