= Matt Capps =

American baseball player (born 1983)

- Capps with the Minnesota Twins
- Pitcher
- Born: September 3, 1983 (age 42); Douglasville, Georgia, U.S.
- Batted: Right Threw: Right

MLB debut
- September 16, 2005, for the Pittsburgh Pirates

Last MLB appearance
- September 24, 2012, for the Minnesota Twins

MLB statistics
- Win–loss record: 29–33
- Earned run average: 3.52
- Strikeouts: 319
- Saves: 138
- Stats at Baseball Reference

Teams
- Pittsburgh Pirates (2005–2009); Washington Nationals (2010); Minnesota Twins (2010–2012)

Career highlights and awards
- All-Star (2010)

Matthew Dicus Capps (born September 3, 1983) is an American former professional baseball relief pitcher. He is a 2002 graduate of Alexander High School in Douglasville, Georgia, where he lettered in football, basketball, cross-country and baseball before receiving a scholarship to Louisiana State University. He has played in Major League Baseball (MLB) for the Pittsburgh Pirates, Washington Nationals and Minnesota Twins.

== Early life ==
Capps was born in Douglasville, Georgia to Mike and Kathy Capps. Capps played high school baseball at Robert S. Alexander High School and signed a letter of intent to play college baseball at Louisiana State.

== Professional career ==
=== Pittsburgh Pirates ===
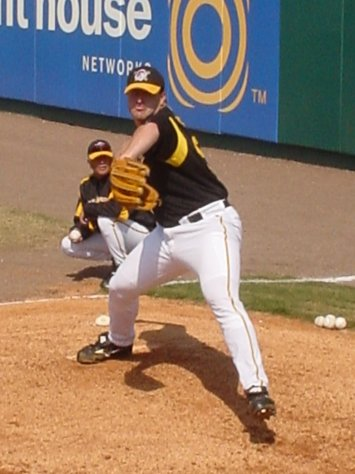
Capps with the Pirates in 2006

Capps was drafted by the Pirates in the 7th round of the 2002 Major League Baseball draft.

=== 2005 ===
Drafted as a starting pitcher, Capps was moved to the bullpen to begin the season. He pitched well in his new role, earning multiple promotions and pitching across three different minor league levels. On September 16, Capps had his contract purchased from Triple A Indianapolis . He debuted later that same day.

=== 2006 ===
Capps made the team out of spring training. He began the season in a middle relief role but ended the season as Pittsburgh's primary set up man behind closers Mike González and Salomón Torres. He pitched in 80.2 innings across 85 games, posting a 9-1 record and a 3.79 ERA with 56 strikeouts. He led all Major League rookie pitchers in appearances.

=== 2007 ===
He began the year as the team's set-up man, but took over the closer's role midway through the season. He finished the season with 21 saves to go along with a 4-7 record and a 2.28 ERA in 79 innings across 76 games.

=== 2008 ===
Capps started the season with 15 consecutive saves. On July 2, he was placed on the disabled list after experiencing arm soreness. He spent nearly two months on the Injured List, finishing the season with 21 saves and a 2-3 record in 49 games.

=== 2009 ===
Capps earned 27 saves while posting a 5.80 ERA over 54.1 innings pitched. He was non-tendered at the end of the season, becoming a free agent.

=== Washington Nationals ===
On January 6, 2010, Capps signed a one-year, $3.5 million deal with the Washington Nationals. Capps was named the Delivery Man of the Month Award winner for April 2010, after recording ten saves in ten opportunities with an ERA of 0.68 for the month. He would convert his first 16 save opportunities of the season, en route to recording 23 saves in the season's opening half, good for a tie for second in the major leagues. He earned his first All-Star Game selection, voted in on the Player's Ballot. He was the leading vote-getter among all NL relievers.

Capps went on to be the winning pitcher in the game. The sixth hurler for the NL, he struck out the previous day's Home Run Derby winner David Ortiz looking with a 2–2 fastball to end the sixth inning, holding the American Leaguers to a 1–0 lead. He was the beneficiary of Brian McCann's three-run double in the seventh.

=== Minnesota Twins ===
On July 29, 2010, Capps was traded to the Minnesota Twins for catcher Wilson Ramos and left-handed pitcher Joe Testa. He took over the closer role from Jon Rauch and picked up his first save as a Twin in his first outing against the Seattle Mariners, on July 30. Through October 2, Capps was 2–0 with a 2.00 ERA for the Twins, with 16 saves in 18 opportunities. Upon the return of Joe Nathan, Capps was reassigned to the setup role for the 2011 season. After two blown saves in a row, Nathan relinquished the closer role to Capps on April 16. Capps again became a setup man for Nathan after a dramatic loss at Target Field on July 15, 2011.

In December 2011, Capps re-signed with the Twins. The contract guarantees at least one year and at least $4,750,000.

On October 24, 2012, the Twins announced they would decline their club option for Capps worth $6MM. Capps received a $250K buyout.

=== Cleveland Indians ===
On January 31, 2013, the Cleveland Indians announced they signed Capps to a minor league deal with an invitation to spring training. They subsequently released him on March 25. He was re-signed to another minor league contract a day later. He was assigned to Triple-A Columbus, where he pitched in 6 games before going on the disabled list with right shoulder inflammation. On June 5, he underwent surgery, ending his season. He gave up 1 run in 7 innings in those 6 games with Columbus, striking out 3.

On October 17, 2013, Capps signed another minor league deal with the Indians with an invitation to spring training. He became a free agent following the 2014 season.

=== Atlanta Braves ===
On February 10, 2015, the Atlanta Braves signed Capps to a minor-league contract with an invite to spring training. He was released on April 4. The Braves resigned Capps to another minor league deal on April 6. He was later released on May 2.

=== Arizona Diamondbacks ===
On February 29, 2016, Capps signed a minor league contract with the Arizona Diamondbacks. In 39 appearances for the Triple–A Reno Aces, compiling a 5.15 ERA with 47 strikeouts and 3 saves across 50 2/3 innings pitched. Capps elected free agency following the season on November 7.

== Pitching style ==
Capps throws five pitches: a four-seam fastball and two-seam fastball (91–95 mph), slider (85–89), and changeup splitter (87–89). Left-handed hitters see more two-seam fastballs and changeups, while righties see more four-seamers and sliders. On a handful of occasions, Capps has experimented with a cutter to right-handers.

== Personal life ==
Capps is a Christian. Capps has spoken about his faith saying, "Baseball is our national pastime, and a lot of people look up to us because of what we do. To be able to use that and funnel that into sharing Christ is an unbelievable opportunity." He was baptized a Baptist at ten years old.

Starting with the 2021 season, Capps became a broadcaster for the Pittsburgh Pirates, splitting his time between radio and television.
