= Ian Snell =

American baseball player (born 1981)

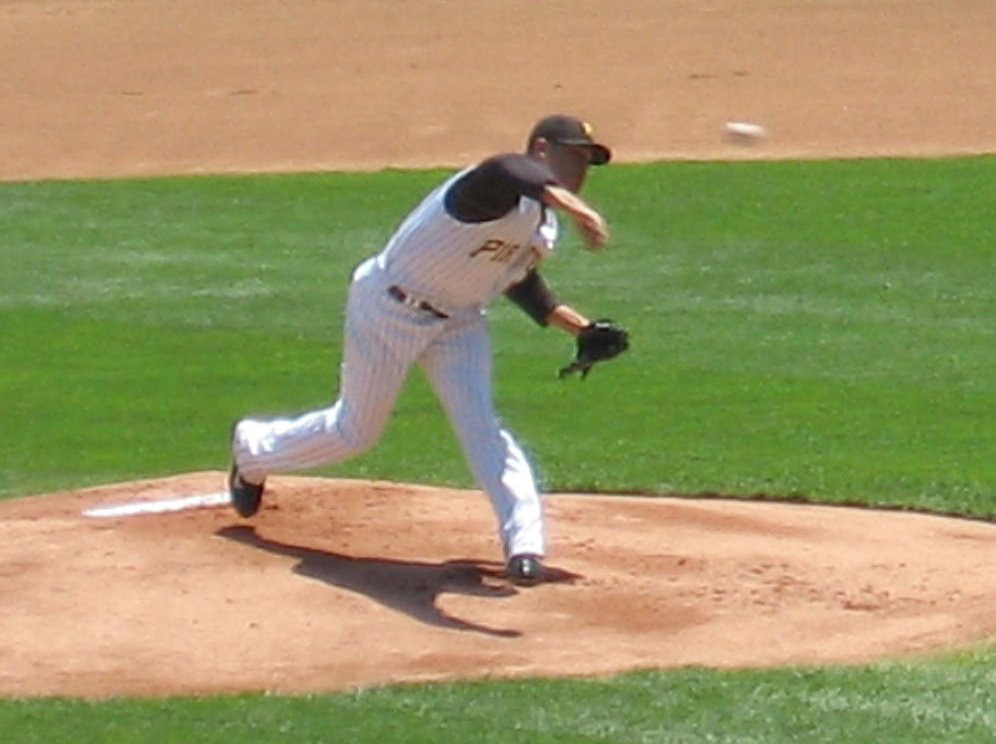
- Snell with the Pittsburgh Pirates
- Pitcher
- Born: October 30, 1981 (age 45); Dover, Delaware, U.S.
- Batted: Right Threw: Right

MLB debut
- August 20, 2004, for the Pittsburgh Pirates

Last MLB appearance
- June 14, 2010, for the Seattle Mariners

MLB statistics
- Win–loss record: 38–53
- Earned run average: 4.80
- Strikeouts: 639
- Stats at Baseball Reference

Teams
- Pittsburgh Pirates (2004–2009); Seattle Mariners (2009–2010)

Ian Dante Snell (born October 30, 1981) is an American former professional baseball right-handed pitcher. He played in Major League Baseball (MLB) for the Pittsburgh Pirates and Seattle Mariners. From 2001 to 2003, he went by the name Ian Oquendo, adopting the last name of his wife, and during the 2009 World Baseball Classic he went by Ian Davila-Snell, adopting his stepfather's surname. He threw a mid-90s fastball, along with a curveball, slider and changeup.

== Professional career ==
After being a standout pitcher at Caesar Rodney High School in Camden, Delaware, Snell made his professional debut with the rookie league Gulf Coast Pirates in 2000 following being selected by the Pirates in the 26th round of the Major League Baseball draft. He made his debut on July 17, pitching 1.2 innings of scoreless relief against the GCL Expos.

In 2001, Snell split the season between the GCL Pirates and the Short Season-A New York – Penn League Williamsport Crosscutters.

Snell played the 2002 season with the South Atlantic League Champion Hickory Crawdads, a Single-A club. There he ranked fourth among league pitchers in strikeouts and seventh in ERA.

In 2003, when Snell went 14–4 with a 3.00 ERA and 145 strikeouts in 26 minor league starts, split between Single-A Lynchburg and Double-A Altoona, he was named the Pirates organizational Pitcher-of-the-Year.

Snell spent the majority of his 2004 season with the Altoona Curve. He set a single-season team record and finished second in the league with 142 strikeouts.

=== Pittsburgh Pirates ===
Snell was later called up to the Pirates, making his major league debut on August 20, 2004, against the St. Louis Cardinals. In his debut, he surrendered one hit (a solo home run to John Mabry), three walks and two strikeouts in two innings of work. He was optioned back to Altoona, but was recalled again on September 21, after Altoona's season ended.

In 2005, Snell split the season between the Triple-A Indianapolis Indians, going 11–3 with a 3.70 ERA, and the Pirates. While with the Indians, he pitched a no-hitter on May 15 against the Norfolk Tides. He was named the International League pitcher of the week twice, for the weeks ending May 1 and 15. He made two separate appearances for the Pirates, from June 26 to August 16 and again from September 12 to the end of the season. He appeared in 15 games, including five starts. His first win came September 19, against Roger Clemens and the Houston Astros. In this game, he allowed only three singles in eight innings of work. It would be his only win in 2005, though, as he finished the season 1–2 with a 5.14 ERA in over 42 innings.

In 2006, Snell won 14 games, the most for Pittsburgh in several seasons, while losing 11 and leading the team in strikeouts.

On January 28, 2007, the Delaware Sportswriters and Broadcasters Association honored Snell as the "John J. Brady Athlete of the Year", an award given annually to the best athlete from Delaware.

On March 16, 2008, Snell agreed to a three-year contract extension with the Pirates worth at least $8 million, including club options for 2011 and 2012. Snell finished the 2008 season with a 5.42 ERA and a record of 7–12. Snell had the worst OBP-against in the majors (.385) and led the National League by giving up nine triples.

Snell was demoted to the Triple-A Indianapolis Indians on June 24, 2009, per his request. In his first Triple-A appearance on June 28, Snell struck out 17 of 21 batters that he faced, while allowing only two hits.

Snell attributed his disappointing 2008–09 results for the major-league Pirates to depression and to disenchantment with his environment.

=== Seattle Mariners ===
On July 29, 2009, Snell and shortstop Jack Wilson were traded to the Seattle Mariners for Jeff Clement, Ronny Cedeño, Aaron Pribanic, Brett Lorin, and Nathan Adcock. On July 31, the Mariners recalled Snell to take the roster spot of pitcher Jarrod Washburn, who had been traded earlier that day. Snell finished 5–2 with a 4.20 ERA in 12 starts with the Mariners in 2009. Overall, with the Pirates and Mariners combined, he finished 7–10 with a 4.84 ERA in 27 starts in 2009.

Snell opened the 2010 season as the second/third starter for the Mariners. He started the season 0–3 with a 4.58 ERA before being demoted to the bullpen. After teammate Doug Fister went on the DL, Snell took over his roster spot, therefore returning to the rotation, and in his next two starts, he proceeded to go 0–2 with a 12.86 ERA. On June 9, Snell had a career-worst start where he pitched only 1.2 innings, giving up eight runs (seven earned), one walk, and struck out only one in a 12–2 loss to the Texas Rangers that dropped him to 0–5. On June 11, Snell was returned to the bullpen after his career-worst start by then-Mariners manager Don Wakamatsu.

On June 15, Snell was designated for assignment. He cleared waivers and was sent outright to Triple-A Tacoma Rainiers on June 20. Following the season, he became a free agent.

=== St. Louis Cardinals ===
On January 14, 2011, Snell signed a minor league contract with the St. Louis Cardinals the deal included an invite to spring training. On March 15, the Cardinals assigned Snell to minor league camp, but he chose instead to retire. In April, he decided to reconsider retiring and the Cardinals released Snell to allow him to pursue any opportunities.

=== Los Angeles Dodgers ===
On May 20, 2011, Snell signed a minor league contract with the Los Angeles Dodgers. He was assigned to the AAA Albuquerque Isotopes. He pitched in six games for the Isotopes, making five starts and had a 1–2 record and 11.05 ERA. He was suspended by the team on July 14 for unspecified reasons and missed the rest of the season. He was released on March 24.

=== Long Island Ducks ===
On March 25, 2013, Snell signed with the Long Island Ducks of the Atlantic League. He became a free agent following the season. He appeared in 50 games 51.1 innings of relief going 2–3 with a 4.56 ERA with 58 strikeouts and 1 save.

== International career ==
Snell, whose father has some Puerto Rican ancestry, played for Puerto Rico in the 2009 World Baseball Classic.

== Other ==
Snell was inducted into the Delaware Sports Hall of Fame in 2019.
