= 2008 Houston Astros season =

2008 Houston Astros
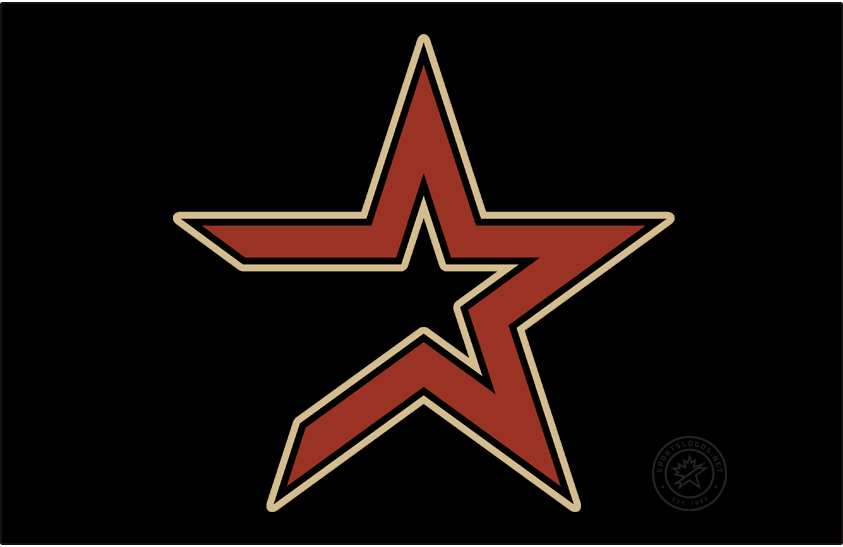
- League: National League
- Division: Central
- Ballpark: Minute Maid Park
- City: Houston, Texas
- Record: 86–75 (.534)
- Divisional place: 3rd
- Owners: Drayton McLane Jr.
- General managers: Ed Wade
- Managers: Cecil Cooper
- Television: FSN Houston; KTXH (My 20); Bill Brown, Jim Deshaies
- Radio: KTRH; Milo Hamilton, Brett Dolan, Dave Raymond; KLAT (Spanish)
- Stats: ESPN.com; Baseball Reference

The 2008 Houston Astros season was the 47th season for the Major League Baseball (MLB) franchise located in Houston, Texas, their 44th as the Astros, 47th in the National League (NL), 15th in the NL Central division, and ninth at Minute Maid Park. The Astros entered the season with a 73–89 record, in fourth place in the NL Central division and 12 games behind the division-champion Chicago Cubs.

On March 31, pitcher Roy Oswalt made his sixth consecutive Opening Day start for the Astros, hosted by the San Diego Padres at Petco Park, but were defeated, 4–0. In the amateur draft, the Astros' first round selections included catcher Jason Castro (10th overall) and pitcher Jordan Lyles (38th).

First baseman Lance Berkman and shortstop Miguel Tejada were selected to the MLB All-Star Game, representing the Astros and playing for the National League, It was the fourth career selection for Berkman, and fifth for Tejada. Closer José Valverde led the NL in saves with 44, the third pitcher to do so for Houston. On August 17, the jersey number of former second baseman Craig Biggio (7) was retired during a pre-game ceremony. On September 23, former Astros outfielder Jesús Alou was honored with the Hispanic Heritage Hall of Fame's Pioneer Award.

Houston finished the 2008 season with a 86–75 record for third place in the NL West, and 11 games behind Chicago for first place. In the NL Wild Card race, Houston ranked second, trailing the Milwaukee Brewers by 3 1/2 games, thus missing the playoffs. This was the 15th season in a span of 17 that Houston had finished with a record . of .500 or better, since 1992, and their final while still competing in the National League.

== Off season ==
=== Summary ===
The Houston Astros concluded the 2007 epoch with a record of 73–89 (.451), ranking in fourth place in the NL Central division, and 12 games behind the division-champion Chicago Cubs. During an era of unprecedented consistency for Houston, since 1992, the 2007 season was just their second losing campaign, with the other being 2000. On June 28, Craig Biggio attained the 3,000th hit of his career, becoming the 27th player in Major League history. Biggio played his final Major League game on September 30, 2007, retiring after 20 seasons, all as a member of the Astros. Moreover, Biggio became the first Astro to be recognized with the Roberto Clemente Award, and was bestowed a second consecutive Heart & Hustle Award. Former Colt .45s/Astros second baseman Joe Morgan was included on the 50th anniversary All-time Gold Glove Team. Carlos Lee won the Silver Slugger, joining José Cruz (1983 and 1984) and Moisés Alou (1998) as the third Astros outfielder to win the award.

On October 29, all six eligible Astros players filed for free agency. The list included catcher Brad Ausmus, infielder Mike Lamb, infielder Mark Loretta, outfielder Orlando Palmeiro, left-handed reliever Trever Miller and right-handed reliever Brian Moehler.

On October 30, the Astros signed catcher Brad Ausmus to a 1-year, $2 million contract.

On November 8, The Astros acquired outfielder Michael Bourn, third baseman Michael Costanzo, and right-handed reliever Geoff Geary from the Philadelphia Phillies in exchange for right-handed pitcher Brad Lidge and infielder Eric Bruntlett. The announcement was made by Astros General Manager Ed Wade.

On November 16, the Astros acquired right-handed reliever Óscar Villarreal from the Atlanta Braves in exchange for center fielder Josh Anderson. On the same day, the Astros also signed outfielder Yordany Ramirez as a free agent.

On November 20, the Astros signed free agent utilityman Geoff Blum to a one-year deal including a club option for a second year.

On November 26, the Astros signed free agent relief pitcher Doug Brocail to a one-year deal.

On November 30, the Astros and free agent Kazuo Matsui agreed to a 3-year, $16.5 million deal. Matsui played second base for the NL Champion Colorado Rockies in the 2007 season.

On December 12, the Astros acquired shortstop Miguel Tejada from the Orioles for five players. The Astros traded outfielder Luke Scott, pitchers Matt Albers, Troy Patton and Dennis Sarfate and third baseman Mike Costanzo to Baltimore for Tejada. Adam Everett, the Astros shortstop at the time, had to deal with a double-whammy: not only did the Astros trade for Tejada, they also non-tendered Everett, leaving him without a team as of 11 p.m. CT.

On December 14, The Houston Astros' offseason of dealing continued on Friday when the club traded Chris Burke, Chad Qualls and Juan Gutiérrez to the Arizona Diamondbacks in exchange for closer José Valverde.

In January, Brandon Backe, Ty Wigginton, and Dave Borkowski were signed to a one-year contract.

On February 20, Shawn Chacón signed a one-year deal.

On March 29, the Astros released Woody Williams.

On March 30, the contracts of OF José Cruz Jr. and RHP Brian Moehler were purchased from Triple-A Round Rock.

=== Spring training ===
In spring training the Astros posted a 13–18 record culminating with a 9–4 win in the final spring training game at Minute Maid Park.

== Regular season ==
=== Summary ===
==== March–April ====
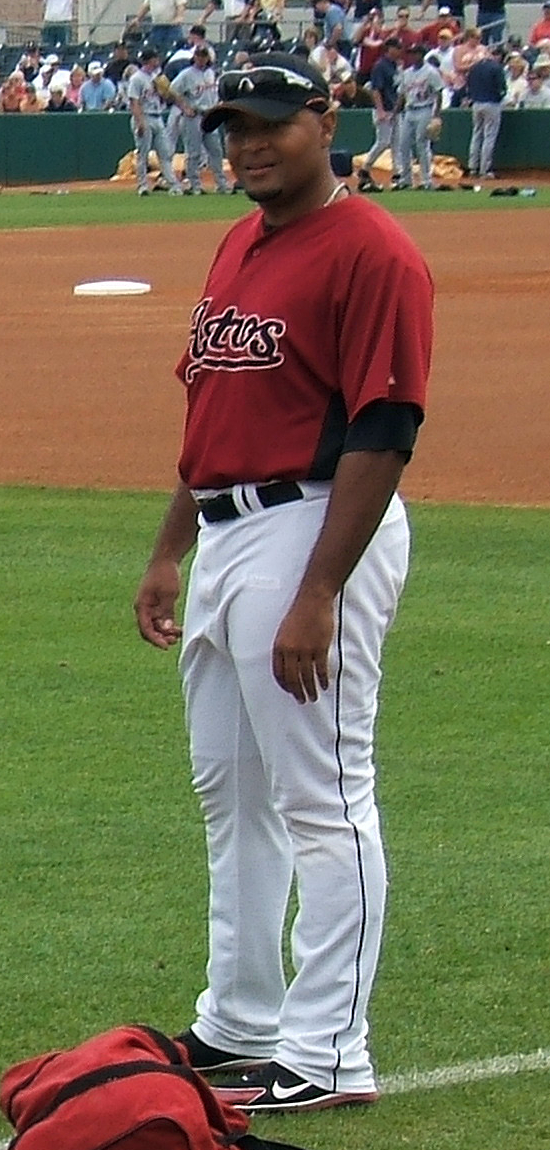
Carlos Lee collected both his 100th RBI of the season and 1000th of his career on the same on August 8.

Opening Day starting lineup
Uniform	Player	Position
14	Michael Bourn	Center fielder
9	Hunter Pence	Right fielder
17	Lance Berkman	First baseman
45	Carlos Lee	Left fielder
10	Miguel Tejada	Shortstop
21	Ty Wigginton	Third baseman
8	Mark Loretta	Second baseman
11	Brad Ausmus	Catcher
44	Roy Oswalt	Pitcher
Venue: Petco Park • Final: San Diego 4, Houston 0 Sources:

The Astros commenced their 2008 season on March 31 at Petco Park for Opening Day. Right-hander Roy Oswalt, making his sixth Opening Day start for the Astros, took over the club record for pitchers, surpassing five each by J. R. Richard (1980), Mike Scott (1991), and Shane Reynolds (2000). Oswalt started opposite the reigning Cy Young Award winner, Jake Peavy. Behind Peavy's dominant, scoreless seven innings, the Padres defeated the Astros, 4 to 0. At the plate, Peavy delivered San Diego's first two tallies of the season with a sacrifice fly and a run batted in (RBI) single. Oswalt, meanwhile, was charged with three runs over 5 1/3 innings to take the defeat.

After having lost the first two games of the 2008 campaign to the San Diego Padres, the Astros trailed 6–5 on April 2 in the top of the ninth with two outs. With Padres closer Trevor Hoffman on the mound, the Astros put two runners on base. Hunter Pence then scalded a line drive that deflected off Adrián González' glove, which skipped into right field, allowing Houston to tie the score. Next, Lance Berkman smashed a three-run home run to deep center field, positioning the Astros in front for a 9–6 score. Astros reliever José Valverde then closed out the Astros' first 2008 win. Geoff Blum, Ty Wigginton, and Carlos Lee all went deep for their first home runs of the year. Berkman also purloined a base.

During consecutive games on April 21 and 22, Miguel Tejada became the sixth hitter in team history to record four hits each over consecutive games, succeeding Jeff Bagwell on July 14 and 15, 1995. Tejada doubled twice, homered, and drove in five runners. (Note: Next accomplished for Houston by Lance Berkman just weeks later on May 4 to May 6, 2008. Criteria: Longest streak of consecutive games, playing for HOU, in the regular season, requiring Hits ≥ 4, sorted by most games matching criteria.)

Lance Berkman won the NL Player of the Week Award for April 21 to 27: The Astros went 5–2, while Berkman batted .455 / .517 on-base percentage (OBP) / 1.136 slugging percentage, four home runs, 12 runs batted in (RBI), and 25 total bases. This was the first of five Player of the Week Awards for the Astros on the season, two of which were claimed by Berkman.

Starting April 29, Berkman recorded his season-best 17-game hitting streak, during which he slashed .545 / .610 / 1.015 / 1.626 (36-for-66), 23 runs scored, 8 home runs and 21 RBI. The Astros went 12–5 during this span. This was tied for sixth-longest in the major leagues and Berkman's slash line represented the highest of any 17 games or longer. (Note: Longest streak of consecutive games, in 2008, in the regular season, requiring hits ≥ 1, sorted by most games matching criteria.)

The following day, Hunter Pence commenced his season-long hitting streak of 16 games, during which he slashed .359 / .425 / .547 / .972.

==== May ====
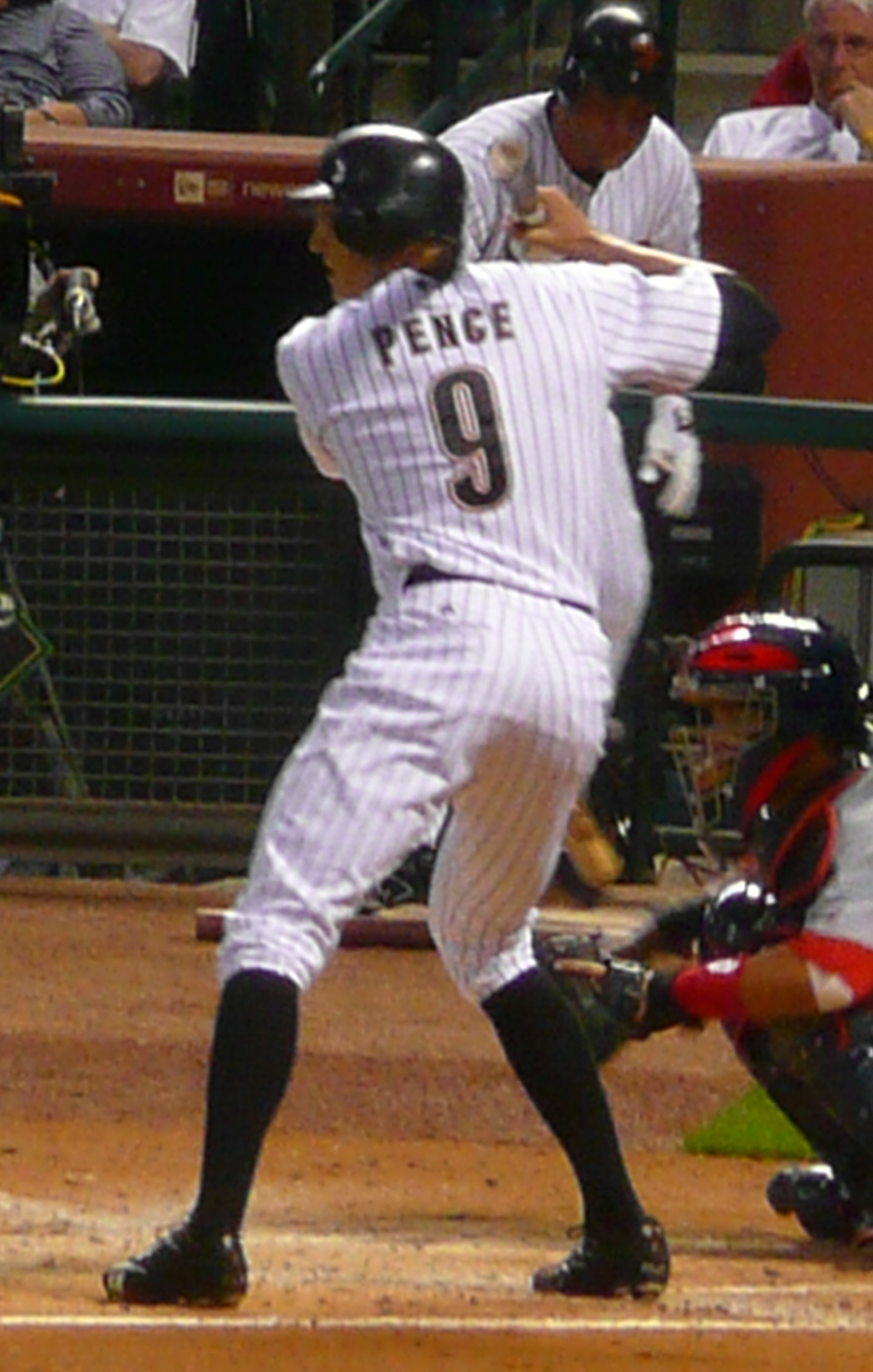
Hunter Pence at-bat in 2008.

From May 3 to 10, Lance Berkman piloted a 7-game multi-hit hitting streak that tied for second-longest in the major leagues this season, trailing only Cristian Guzmán (8). During this interval, Berkman slashed .741 / .788 / 1.296 / 2.084, (20-for-27), six doubles, three home runs, nine RBI, six walks, and no strikeouts. (Note: Longest streak of consecutive games, in 2008, in the regular season, requiring hits ≥ 2, sorted by most games matching criteria.) On May 4 and 6, Lance Berkman became the seventh hitter to attain consecutive four-hit games for Houston. Berkman had three doubles and a home run. Miguel Tejada attained consecutive four-hit games just weeks earlier on April 22, and April 23. Berkman again won the NL Player of the Week for the week ended May 11, his second such award within three weeks.

After being shut down for six innings via a no-hit bid from Hiroki Kuroda on May 11, Hunter Pence rifled a two-out single in the seventh. Houston later responded with six runs in the eighth inning. With two outs in the bottom of the ninth, two Dodgers runs already in and baserunner on first, Valverde relieved Doug Brocail. He retired Andre Ethier on a popup to preserve Houston's 8–5 comeback win over the Los Angeles Dodgers.

Lance Berkman belted a two-run home on May 14 at AT&T Park to lead an Astros 6–3 win over the San Francisco Giants. Already on an offensive tear to start the season off, the home run put Berkman at the top of the NL leaderboard (14) and also for each of runs scored (43), runs batted in (40 RBI), on-base plus slugging percentage (1.264 OPS), to go along with a robust .388 batting average.

The following day, on May 15, Berkman connected for a McCovey Cove splash landing, just the 16th by an opposing player, off Vinnie Chulk.

Though Pence had homered twice on May 23 to put the Astros ahead, 4–3, all eyes were on Valverde, who took a line drive off his face. However, he stayed in retire the Philadelphia Phillies and close out his 15th save.

On May 27, Pence hit 5-for-5 against the St. Louis Cardinals, leading an 8–2 Astros win. This win moved the Astros into second-place tie with St. Louis to trail only the Chicago Cubs.

Carlos Lee became the sixth player in club history to register 30 or more RBI over a calendar month, with the most recent having been Jeff Bagwell in July 2001. (Note: In June 2018, Alex Bregman and Evan Gattis each became the next Astros to match Lee's achievement. Criteria: In the regular season, from 1898 to 2026, playing for HOU, for any choice in months, requiring runs batted in ≥ 28, sorted by greatest runs batted in.)

Over 28 contests during the month of May, Lance Berkman batted .387 / .521 on-base percentage (OBP) / .785 slugging percentage (SLG) / 1.306 on-base plus slugging (OPS), 10 doubles, nine home runs, and 24 RBI in 93 at bats. He also aggregated 73 total bases, scored 20 runs, drew 24 bases on balls, and struck out 11 times. Hence, Berkman was recognized as NL Player of the Month, his second instance winning the award, while also having been the most recent Astro so named, in May 2004.

==== June ====
The Astros announced on June 25 an indefinite suspension of starting pitcher Shawn Chacón and eventually, voiding of his contract. Chacón had initiated an altercation with general manager Ed Wade in which he grabbed Wade's neck and threw him to the ground.

==== July ====
On July 27, Geoff Blum homered twice for his fifth career multi-home run game and ninth with four or more RBI. Meanwhile, Brad Ausmus produced his 10th career four-hit game, scored twice and drove in two runs. Blum connected both times off Jeff Suppan, while the efforts led an 11–6 win over the Milwaukee Brewers. Miguel Tejeda collected two hits and three RBI, Lance Berkman, Hunter Pence, and Darin Erstad all added two-hit games.

On July 29, Carlos Lee connected for his third grand slam as a Houston Astro. The blast occurred during the bottom of the fifth inning to deep left field, capping a 6–2 triumph over the Cincinnati Reds. Brian Moehler (6–4) cruised for the victory, pitching into the ninth and until the penultimate out. With two baserunners on, Wesley Wright entered in relief and whiffed Joey Votto for the final out and save, the first of his major league career.

==== August ====
On August 6, Brandon Backe surrendered a career-worst 11 runs over 3 2/3 innings. Most of the damaged was done in the third inning, when Mark DeRosa connected for a grand slam, highlighting an 11–4 defeat to the Cubs.

With a victory on August 7, Houston launched a season-high eight-game winning streak. Led by seven innings with one run allowed from Roy Oswalt (9–8), the Astros took a 7–4 decision from the Cincinnati Reds. Tejada, Berkman, and Lee collected three hits each, while Pence slugged his 15th longball.

Carlos Lee, in peak form, on August 8 delivered a two-run double in the tenth inning to defeat the Reds, 9–5. The play brought an NL-leading 100th run batted in (RBI) of the season, as well the 1000th of his career. Lee added a home run among four hits, and Kaz Matsui, Humberto Quintero and Pence also went deep. However, the following day, Lee sustained a fractured pinkie when hit by pitch on a Bronson Arroyo offering, halting his season after 115 games.

For the week of August 4–10, Lee was recognized with the NL Player of the Week Award: At that point, Lee had been on course for the best offensive statistical season of his major league career, with injuries never being an issue. In each of ten different seasons, "El Caballo" appeared in 150 or more contests.

On August 16, Brandon Backe tied a major league record by relinquishing two grand slams in the same game, during the first inning, to Miguel Montero, and then in the sixth, to Chris Young. This led an 11–5 Arizona Diamondbacks' victory over the Astros. Montero also cranked a solo home run in the fourth inning. The three home runs and 11 earned runs charged to Backe both tied a career-high.

==== Retirement of Craig Biggio's uniform number 7 ====
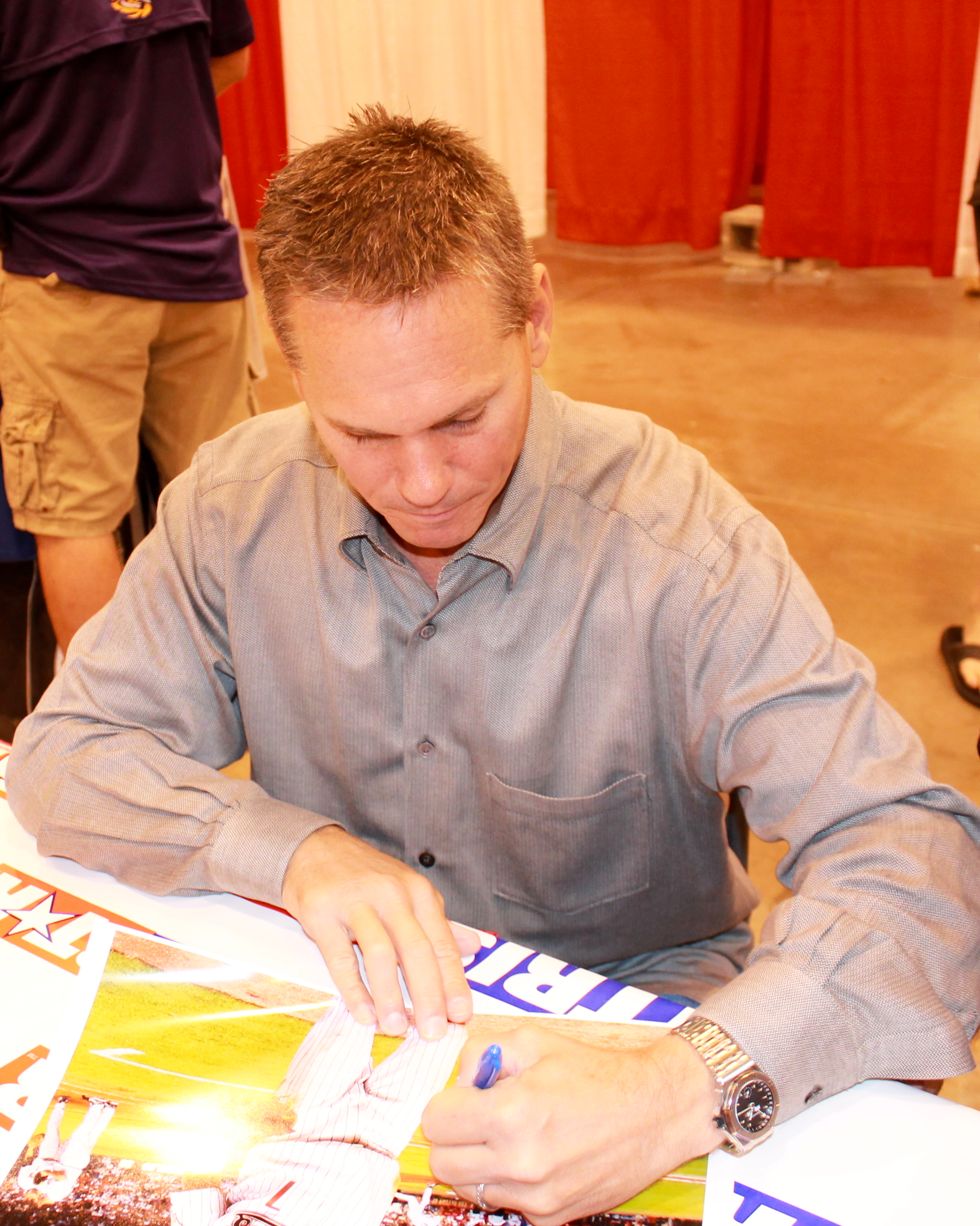
Craig Biggio signs autographs at a Houston sports collectors show in 2014.

Longtime second baseman Craig Biggio's jersey number 7 was officially retired by the club during a pre-game ceremony at Minute Maid Park on August 17, 2008. A seven-time All-Star, Biggio played all 20 seasons with the Astros and retired as the franchise leader in games played (2,850), at bats (10,876), runs scored (1,844), and hits (3,060), and the all-time leader in doubles by right-handed hitters in major league history (668).

==== Rest of August ====
The Astros commenced an eight-game winning streak on August 27, matching their season-high started less than three weeks earlier, on August 7.

Lance Berkman connected for his first career walk-off home run on August 29, the 285th home run, to set a major league record. Previously, Alex Rodriguez (275) held the record for number of times homering prior to his first Major League walk-off blast. It was a solo home run off Russ Springer during the bottom of the ninth to win it, 3–2, over the St. Louis Cardinals. This was also the first walk-off hit of Berkman's career.

Over 14 appearances during the month of August, José Valverde recorded a 0.64 earned run average (ERA), 1–0 W–L record, and 10 saves. Valverde struck out 17, and surrendered five hits and three walks for a 0.571 walks plus hits per inning pitched (WHIP). Valverde successfully converted a save in each of his final 10 outings of the month. Following this production, Valverde was named Delivery Man of the Month. He was the first Astros reliever to be recognized since Brad Lidge in 2005.

==== September ====
Closer José Valverde converted his 40th save on September 7, also recording his 15th successive conversion. Valverde worked the 11th inning and whiffed two to finalize a 9-to-7 triumph over the Chicago Cubs. Valverde became the third Astros moundsman to attain 40 or more saves in a season, joining Billy Wagner (44 in 2003) and Brad Lidge (42 in 2005). (Note: For single seasons, playing for HOU, in the regular season, requiring saves ≥ 40, sorted by ascending season.)

On September 8, in his first major league plate appearance, Mark Saccomanno connected for a home run on the first pitch thrown to him at the level. He became the 12th player in National League history to achieve the latter distinction, and the 25th major leaguer overall. Saccomanno appeared as a pinch hitter in the fifth inning. (Note: Saccomano became the fourth Houston Astro to hit a home in his first major league plate appearance. He was preceded by Charlton Jimerson on September 4, 2006, and succeeded by Zach Cole on September 12, 2025.)

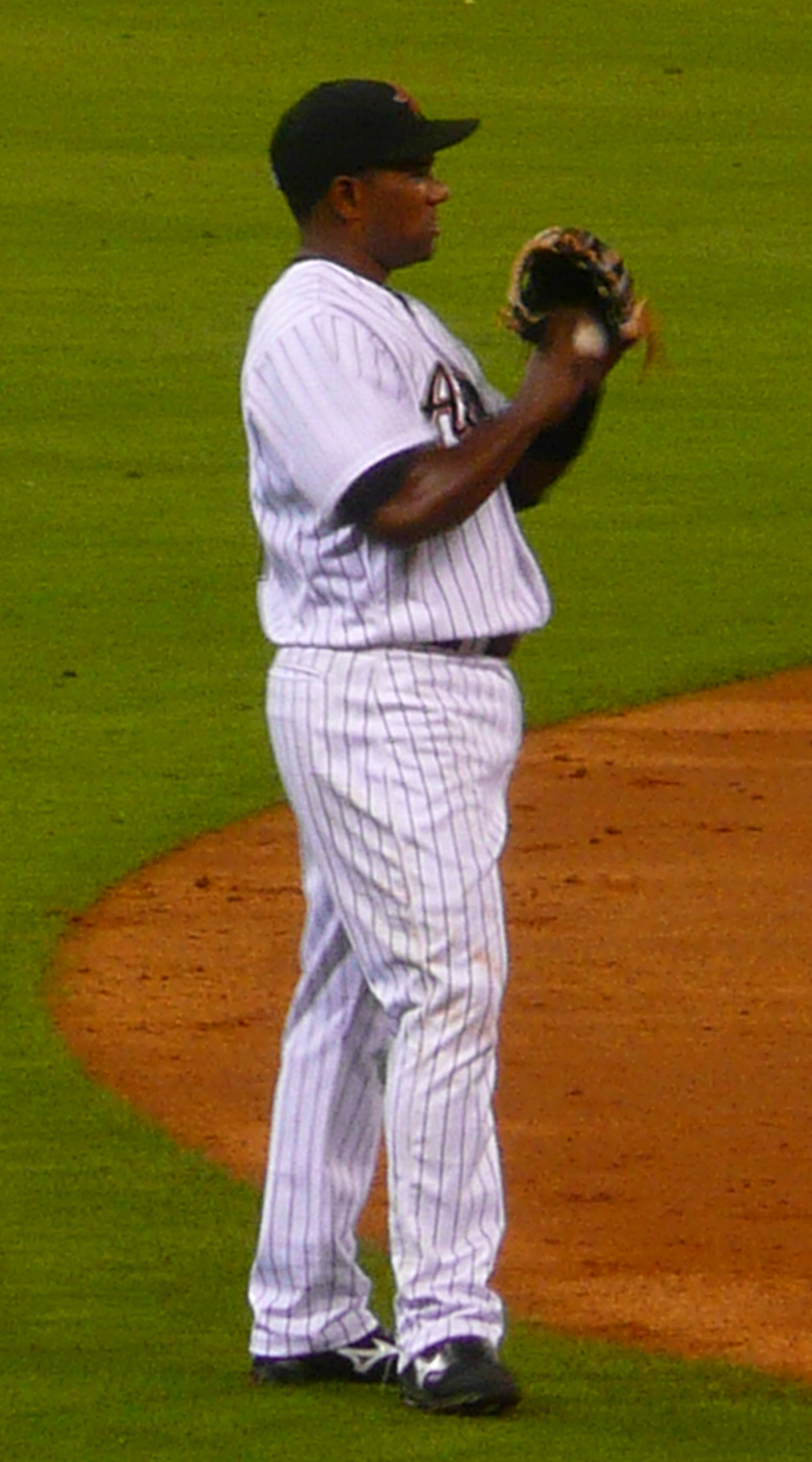
Miguel Tejada playing for the Astros in 2008.

Roy Oswalt established the Astros' franchise record with a 32 1/3 scoreless innings streak through September 11, surpassing 31 innings set by J. R. Richard in 1980, while having polished off a 6–0 shutout of the Pittsburgh Pirates on 90 pitches. It extended Houston's winning streak to six games to pull within 3 games of the NL Wild Card-leading Milwaukee Brewers. Having won 14 of 15 games, Houston jetted to a major league-leading 36–16 record since the All-Star break.

Due to damage in Houston inflicted by Hurricane Ike, the September 14 home contest against the Cubs was relocated to Miller Park in Milwaukee. There, Carlos Zambrano no-hit the Astros, 5–0, making it the first-ever neutral site no-hitter in Major League Baseball. Zambrano allowed just two base-runners, issuing a walk to Michael Bourn in the fourth inning and hit by pitch of Hunter Pence in the fifth inning.

During a pre-game ceremony at Minute Maid Park on September 23, 2008, former Houston Astros outfielder Jesús Alou was recognized with the Hispanic Heritage Baseball Museum Hall of Fame's Pioneer Award.

On September 26, José Valverde was charged with his first blown save since July 21, 2008, ending a streak of 18 straight save conversions. However, Valverde (6–3) overcame a shaky outing to earn the victory. With one out during the bottom of the ninth inning, Darin Erstad took Braves reliever Julián Tavárez deep for a walk-off home run. At the time, eighteen consecutive saves represented the fourth-longest stretch in club history, following Lidge (24 consecutive from June 21 to September 28, 2005, and Wagner (twice: 22 from July 8 to September 24, 2003; and 19 from April 16 to July 9, 1998). (Note: Longest streak of consecutive games, playing for HOU, in the regular season, up to 2008, requiring saves ≥ 1, sorted by most games matching criteria.)

==== Performance overview ====
The Astros concluded the 2008 season with a 86–75 record for third place in the NL Central, and 11 games behind Chicago for first place, an improvement from 73 wins in 2007. In the NL Wild Card race, Houston ranked second, trailing the Milwaukee Brewers by 3 1/2 games, thus missing the playoffs. The 2008 season resulted as Houston's final winning campaign as members of the National League, (Note: Houston would be realigned as members of the American League (AL) in 2013.) and final until their next Wild Card title in 2015, closing out an era of unprecedented consistency for the club. Over a span of 30 seasons since 1979, twenty-two redounded with a winning record, including fourteen of the final 16 (since 1993).

The Astros as a team committed 67 errors, the fewest by any team in National League history, excluding seasons that were shortened.

José Valverde led the National League in saves with 44, tying Billy Wagner for the club record (2003). Valverde became the first Colt .45s/Astros reliever since Fred Gladding in 1969 to lead the National League in saves, and third overall, also joining Hal Woodeshick in 1964. Valverde also became the third Astros reliever to record 40 or more saves, also joining Brad Lidge (2005).

Lance Berkman, leader of the National League in doubles (46) for the second time, first did so in the 2001 season. Berkman joined César Cedeño (twice, 1971 and 1972) and former teammate and fellow "Killer B" Craig Biggio (thrice, 1994, 1998 and 1999) as Astros to have led the league in multiple campaigns. Berkman was also recognized as team Most Valuable Player (MVP) for the fifth time, which broke a tie with José Cruz and was one behind another fellow Killer B Jeff Bagwell for must in club history.

Miguel Tejada established a National League single-season record by grounding into 32 double plays. (Note: By contrast, in 1997, Biggio played the first 162-game season (no games missed) in the Major Leagues without having grounded into any double plays.)

=== League standings ===
==== National League Central ====
NL Central
Team	W	L	Pct.	GB	Home	Road
Chicago Cubs	97	64	.602	—	55‍–‍26	42‍–‍38
Milwaukee Brewers	90	72	.556	7½	49‍–‍32	41‍–‍40
Houston Astros	86	75	.534	11	47‍–‍33	39‍–‍42
St. Louis Cardinals	86	76	.531	11½	46‍–‍35	40‍–‍41
Cincinnati Reds	74	88	.457	23½	43‍–‍38	31‍–‍50
Pittsburgh Pirates	67	95	.414	30½	39‍–‍42	28‍–‍53

==== Record versus opponents ====
National League

2008 National League record Source: MLB Standings Grid – 2008
Team	AZ	ATL	CHC	CIN	COL	FLA	HOU	LAD	MIL	NYM	PHI	PIT	SD	SF	STL	WAS	AL
Arizona	–	3–5	2–4	2–4	15–3	2–7	4–2	8–10	2–5	3–3	3–4	4–3	10–8	11–7	3–4	4–2	6–9
Atlanta	5–3	–	0–6	3–3	4–3	10–8	3–3	4–2	3–6	11–7	4–14	2–5	5–1	2–5	2–5	6–12	8–7
Chicago	4–2	6–0	–	8–7	5–1	4–3	8–9	5–2	9–7	4–2	3–4	14–4	5–2	4–3	9–6	3–3	6–9
Cincinnati	4–2	3–3	7–8	–	1–5	6–2	3–12	1–7	10–8	3–4	3–5	6–9	4–3	5–1	5–10	4–3	9–6
Colorado	3–15	3–4	1–5	5–1	–	5–3	3–3	8–10	4–3	3–6	0–5	5–2	9–9	11–7	3–4	4–3	7–8
Florida	7–2	8–10	3–4	2–6	3–5	–	4–2	3–4	5–1	8–10	10–8	3–2	4–2	3–3	2–5	14–3	5–10
Houston	2–4	3–3	9–8	12–3	3–3	2–4	–	4–3	7–8	5–2	3–4	8–8	3–3	7–1	7–8	4–2	7–11
Los Angeles	10–8	2–4	2–5	7–1	10–8	4–3	3–4	–	4–2	3–4	4–4	5–2	11–7	9–9	2–4	3–3	5–10
Milwaukee	5–2	6–3	7–9	8–10	3–4	1–5	8–7	2–4	–	2–4	1–5	14–1	4–3	6–0	10–5	6–2	7–8
New York	3–3	7–11	2–4	4–3	6–3	10–8	2–5	4–3	4–2	–	11–7	4–3	2–5	5–1	4–3	12–6	9–6
Philadelphia	4–3	14–4	4–3	5–3	5–0	8–10	4–3	4–4	5–1	7–11	–	4–2	4–2	3–3	5–4	12–6	4–11
Pittsburgh	3–4	5–2	4–14	9–6	2–5	2–3	8–8	2–5	1–14	3–4	2–4	–	3–4	4–2	10–7	3–4	6–9
San Diego	8–10	1–5	2–5	3–4	9–9	2–4	3–3	7–11	3–4	5–2	2–4	4–3	–	5–13	1–6	5–1	3–15
San Francisco	7–11	5–2	3–4	1–5	7–11	3–3	1–7	9–9	0–6	1–5	3–3	2–4	13–5	–	4–3	7–0	6–12
St. Louis	4–3	5–2	6–9	10–5	4–3	5–2	8–7	4–2	5–10	3–4	4–5	7–10	6–1	3–4	–	5–1	7–8
Washington	2–4	12–6	3–3	3–4	3–4	3–14	2–4	3–3	2–6	6–12	6–12	4–3	1–5	0–7	1–5	–	8–10

=== Roster ===
2008 Houston Astros
Roster
Pitchers: 50 Alberto Árias; 41 Brandon Backe; 58 Dave Borkowski; 26 Doug Brocail; 48 Tim Byrdak; 20 Jack Cassel; 30 Shawn Chacón; 29 Geoff Geary; 22 LaTroy Hawkins; 50 Runelvys Hernández; 38 Brian Moehler; 64 Fernando Nieve; 44 Roy Oswalt; 54 Chad Paronto; 51 Wandy Rodríguez; 43 Chris Sampson; 47 José Valverde; 56 Óscar Villarreal; 39 Randy Wolf; 53 Wesley Wright	Catchers: 11 Brad Ausmus; 55 Humberto Quintero; 46 J. R. Towles; Infielders: 17 Lance Berkman; 27 Geoff Blum; 13 José Castillo; 8 Mark Loretta; 3 Kazuo Matsui; 23 Edwin Maysonet; 31 David Newhan; 13 Tomás Pérez; 19 Mark Saccomanno; 10 Miguel Tejada; 21 Ty Wigginton	Outfielders: 1 Reggie Abercrombie; 14 Michael Bourn; 22 José Cruz Jr.; 2 Darin Erstad; 45 Carlos Lee; 9 Hunter Pence; Other batters: 59 J. R. House	Manager: 15 Cecil Cooper; Coaches: 6 Mark Bailey (bullpen); 12 Sean Berry (hitting); 4 Jackie Moore (bench); 25 José Cruz (first base); 75 Dewey Robinson (pitching); 16 Ed Romero (third base)

=== Game log ===
- Home Game
- Away Game
- † = Interleague Game
- All games, dates and times are subject to change

2008 Game Log
March

#	Date	Opponent	Score	Win	Loss	Save	Attendance	Record	Wrapup
1	March 31	@ Padres	0–4	Peavy (1–0)	Oswalt (0–1)		44,965	0–1	

April

#	Date	Opponent	Score	Win	Loss	Save	Attendance	Record	Wrapup
2	April 1	@ Padres	1–2	Young (1–0)	Backe (0–1)	Hoffman (1)	20,825	0–2	
3	April 2	@ Padres	9–6	Valverde (1–0)	Hoffman (0–1)		18,714	1–2	
4	April 3	@ Padres	2–3	E. González (1–0)	Villareal (0–1)	Hoffman (2)	24,432	1–3	
5	April 4	@ Cubs	4–3	Wright (1–0)	Lieber (0–1)	Valverde (1)	37,812	2–3	
6	April 5	@ Cubs	7–9	Hart (1–0)	Oswalt (0–2)	Wood (2)	40,707	2–4	
7	April 6	@ Cubs	2–3	Zambrano (1–0)	Villarreal (0–2)	Wood (3)	40,929	2–5	
8	April 7	Cardinals	5–3	Valverde (2–0)	McClellan (0–1)		43,483	3–5	
9	April 8	Cardinals	3–5	Reyes (1–0)	Geary (0–1)	Isringhausen (4)	30,184	3–6	
10	April 9	Cardinals	4–6	Looper (2–0)	Sampson (0–1)	Isringhausen (5)	29,187	3–7	
11	April 11	Marlins	6–10	Nolasco (1–0)	Oswalt (0–3)		34,191	3–8	
12	April 12	Marlins	5–0	Backe (1–1)	Miller (0–2)		34,336	4–8	
13	April 13	Marlins	5–1	Rodríguez (1–0)	Badenhop (0–1)		29,766	5–8	
14	April 15	@ Phillies	3–4	Seánez (1–1)	Valverde (2–1)		34,609	5–9	
15	April 16	@ Phillies	2–1	Oswalt (1–3)	Kendrick (1–2)	Brocail (1)	31,644	6–9	
16	April 17	@ Phillies	2–10	Myers (2–1)	Backe (1–2)		33,526	6–10	
17	April 18	Rockies	11–5	Morales (1–1)	Sampson (0–2)		34,272	6–11	
18	April 19	Rockies	2–3	Cook (2–1)	Villarreal (0–3)	Corpas (4)	34,540	6–12	
19	April 20	Rockies	6–4	Wright (2–0)	Fuentes (0–1)	Valverde (2)	35,286	7–12	
20	April 21	Padres	10–3	Oswalt (2–3)	Germano (0–2)		28,600	8–12	
21	April 22	Padres	11–7	Valverde (3–1)	Bell (0–2)		33,434	9–12	
22	April 23	@ Reds	9–3	Sampson (1–2)	Arroyo (0–3)		16,017	10–12	
23	April 24	@ Reds	5–3	Cassel (1–0)	Cueto (3)	Valverde (3)	17,403	11–12	
24	April 25	@ Cardinals	3–2	Wright (2–0)	Isringhausen (1–2)	Valverde (4)	41,193	12–12	
25	April 26	@ Cardinals	3–4	Wainwright (3–1)	Borkowski (0–1)		43,040	12–13	
26	April 27	@ Cardinals	1–5	Lohse (3–0)	Backe (1–3)	McClellan (1)	44,222	12–14	
27	April 28	@ D-backs	3–5	Haren (4–1)	Sampson (1–3)	Lyon (8)	19,868	12–15	
28	April 29	@ D-backs	6–4	Brocail (1–0)	González (1–2)	Valverde (5)	20,241	13–15	
29	April 30	@ D-backs	7–8	Medders (1–0)	Borkowski (0–2)	Lyon (9)	21,519	13–16	

May

#	Date	Opponent	Score	Win	Loss	Save	Attendance	Record	Wrapup
30	May 2	Brewers	7–4	Oswalt (3–3)	Villanueva (1–3)	Valverde (6)	39,715	14–16	
31	May 3	Brewers	6–2	Backe (2–3)	Parra (1–2)		35,002	15–16	
32	May 4	Brewers	8 – 6 ^{(12)}	Byrdak (1–0)	Stetter (1–1)		38,301	16–16	
33	May 6	Nationals	6–5	Brocail (2–0)	Ayala (1–2)	Valverde (7)	30,335	17–16	
34	May 7	Nationals	4–3	Valverde (4–1)	Hanrahan (0–2)		30,432	18–16	
35	May 8	Nationals	8–3	Lannan (3–3)	Backe (2–4)		33,433	18–17	
36	May 9	@ Dodgers	7–1	Moehler (1–0)	Lowe (2–3)		52,658	19–17	
37	May 10	@ Dodgers	5–0	Sampson (2–3)	Billingsley (2–5)		45,212	20–17	
38	May 11	@ Dodgers	8–5	Geary (1–1)	Broxton (1–1)	Valverde (8)	40,217	21–17	
39	May 12	@ Giants	7–3	Oswalt (4–3)	Chulk (0–1)	Valderde (9)	30,165	22–17	
40	May 13	@ Giants	4–2	Cain (2–3)	Backe (2–5)	Wilson (12)	30,858	22–18	
41	May 14	@ Giants	6–3	Villarreal (1–3)	Taschner (2–1)	Valverde (10)	33,070	23–18	
42	May 15	@ Giants	8–7	Byrdak (2–0)	Chulk (0–2)	Valverde (11)	33,771	24–18	
43	May 16	@ Rangers †	16–8	Wright (2–1)	Wright (3–1)		32,117	24–19	
44	May 17	@ Rangers†	6–2	Padilla (6–2)	Oswalt (4–4)		38,534	24–20	
45	May 18	@ Rangers†	5–4	Backe (2–5)	Gabbard (1–1)	Valverde (11)	33,561	25–20	
46	May 19	Cubs	7–2	Lilly (5–4)	Moehler (1–1)		32,458	25–21	
47	May 20	Cubs	4–2	Sampson (3–3)	Dempster (5–2)	Valverde (13)	33,339	26–21	
48	May 21	Cubs	5–3	Chacón (1–0)	Gallagher (1–1)		33,251	27–21	
49	May 22	Phillies	7–5	Durbin (1–1)	Wright (3–2)	Lidge (12)	29,263	27–22	
50	May 23	Phillies	4–3	Backe (3–5)	Eaton (0–3)	Valverde (12)	41,152	28–22	
51	May 24	Phillies	4–3	Moehler (2–1)	Myers (2–6)	Brocail (2)	42,660	29–22	
52	May 25	Phillies	6–15	Seánez (3–3)	Nieve (0–1)		43,079	29–23	
53	May 27	@ Cardinals	8–2	Chacón (1–0)	Looper (6–4)		41,104	30–23	
54	May 28	@ Cardinals	1–6	Wainwright (5–2)	Rodríguez (1–1)		41,114	30–24	
55	May 29	@ Cardinals	2–3	Lohse (5–2)	Oswalt (4–5)	Franklin (4)	41,786	30–25	
56	May 30	@ Brewers	5–1	Parra (3–2)	Backe (4–6)		32,039	30–26	
57	May 31	@ Brewers	4–1	Sheets (6–1)	Moehler (2–2)	Torres (5)	42,913	30–27	

June

#	Date	Opponent	Score	Win	Loss	Save	Attendance	Record	Wrapup
58	June 1	@ Brewers	10–1	Bush (2–5)	Chacón (2–1)		44,613	30–28	
59	June 3	@ Pirates	2–0	Rodríguez (2–1)	Dumatrait (2–3)	Valverde (16)	13,183	31–28	
60	June 4	@ Pirates	5–2	Duke (3–4)	Oswalt (4–6)	Capps (12)	9,392	31–29	
61	June 5	@ Pirates	4–3	Maholm (4–5)	Backe (4–7)	Capps (13)	10,728	31–30	
62	June 6	Cardinals	6–1	Moehler (3–2)	Looper (7–5)		38,596	32–30	
63	June 7	Cardinals	8–4	Wainwright (6–3)	Chacón (2–2)		39,811	32–31	
64	June 8	Cardinals	5–4	Lohse (7–2)	Rodríguez (2–2)	Franklin (8)	39,923	32–32	
65	June 10	Brewers	6–1	Oswalt (5–6)	McClung (3–3)		35,058	33–32	
66	June 11	Brewers	10–6	Parra (5–2)	Backe (4–8)		33,806	33–33	
67	June 12	Brewers	9–6	Sheets (7–1)	Moehler (3–3)		35,709	33–34	
68	June 13	Yankees†	2–1	Veras (1–0)	Brocail (2–1)	Farnsworth (1)	43,095	33–35	
69	June 14	Yankees†	8–4	Mussina (10–4)	Rodríguez (2–3)		43,409	33–36	
70	June 15	Yankees†	13–0	Wang (8–2)	Oswalt (5–7)		43,165	33–37	
71	June 17	@ Orioles†	6–5	Johnson (2–2)	Brocail (2–2)	Sherrill (23)	21,535	33–38	
72	June 18	@ Orioles†	2 – 1 ^{(10)}	Bradford (3–2)	Valverde (4–2)		21,112	33–39	
73	June 19	@ Orioles†	7–5	Burres (6–5)	Chacón (2–3)	Sherrill (24)	31,480	33–40	
74	June 20	@ Rays†	4–3	Oswalt (6–7)	Garza (5–4)	Valverde (17)	14,741	34–40	
75	June 21	@ Rays†	4–3	Wheeler (2–3)	Brocail (2–3)		29,953	34–41	
76	June 22	@ Rays†	3–2	Backe (5–8)	Kazmir (6–3)	Valverde (18)	19,778	35–41	
77	June 24	Rangers†	4–3	Moehler (4–3)	Hurley (0–1)	Valverde (19)	40,052	36–41	
78	June 25	Rangers†	3–2	Mendoza (1–2)	Oswalt (6–8)	Wilson (16)	32,567	36–42	
79	June 26	Rangers†	7–2	Rodríguez (3–3)	Millwood (5–4)		36,506	37–42	
80	June 27	Red Sox†	6–1	Matsuzaka (9–1)	Hernández (0–1)	Papelbon (24)	42,327	37–43	
81	June 28	Red Sox†	11–10	Brocail (3–3)	Delcarmen (0–2)	Valverde (20)	43,073	38–43	
82	June 29	Red Sox†	3–2	Brocail (4–3)	Aardsma (2–2)	Valverde (21)	42,066	39–43	
83	June 30	Dodgers	4–1	Oswalt (7–8)	Stults (2–1)	Valverde (22)	28,827	40–44	

July

#	Date	Opponent	Score	Win	Loss	Save	Attendance	Record	Wrapup
84	July 1	Dodgers	7 – 6 ^{(11)}	Park (4–2)	Wright (3–3)	Saito (13)	31,914	40–44	
85	July 2	Dodgers	4–1	Kuroda (4–6)	Hernández (0–2)		34,058	40–45	
86	July 3	Dodgers	5–2	Billingsley (8–7)	Backe (5–9)	Saito (14)	35,696	40–46	
87	July 4	@ Braves	6–2	Hudson (9–6)	Moehler (4–4)		48,045	40–47	
88	July 5	@ Braves	6–1	Sampson (4–3)	Reyes (3–7)		37,049	41–47	
89	July 6	@ Braves	7 – 6 ^{(17)}	Ring (2–1)	Byrdak (2–1)		24,169	41–48	
90	July 7	@ Pirates	10–7	Bautista (2–2)	Hernández (0–3)	Marte (2)	13,323	41–49	
91	July 8	@ Pirates	4–3	Grabow (5–2)	Brocail (4–4)	Marte (3)	17,867	41–50	
92	July 9	@ Pirates	6–4	Moehler (5–4)	Burnett (0–1)	Valverde (23)	13,884	42–50	
93	July 11	@ Nationals	10–0	Redding (7–3)	Paronto (0–1)	Shell (1)	33,653	42–51	
94	July 12	@ Nationals	6–4	Rodríguez (4–3)	Balester (1–2)	Valverde (24)	30,682	43–51	
95	July 13	@ Nationals	5–0	Backe (6–9)	Pérez (2–7)		31,463	44–51	
96	July 18	Cubs	2–1	Geary (2–1)	Howry (3–3)		42,368	45–51	
97	July 19	Cubs	4–1	Rodríguez (5–3)	Zambrano (10–4)	Valverde (25)	43,129	46–51	
98	July 20	Cubs	9–0	Dempster (11–4)	Backe (6–10)		41,161	46–52	
99	July 21	Pirates	9–2	Valverde (4–3)	Yates (4–2)		34,624	46–53	
100	July 22	Pirates	8–2	Maholm (7–6)	Cassel (1–1)		33,996	46–54	
101	July 23	Pirates	8–7	Osoria (4–3)	Geary (2–2)	Marte (5)	36,091	46–55	
102	July 25	@ Brewers	3–1	Rodríguez (6–3)	Parra (9–3)	Valverde (26)	41,357	47–55	
103	July 26	@ Brewers	6–4	Gagné (4–2)	Brocail (4–5)	Torres (20)	43,489	47–56	
104	July 27	@ Brewers	11–6	Sampson (5–3)	Suppan (5–7)		31,565	48–56	
105	July 28	Reds	5–4	Oswalt (8–8)	Cueto (7–10)	Valverde (27)	31,783	49–56	
106	July 29	Reds	6–2	Moehler (6–4)	Arroyo (9–8)	Wright (1)	34,015	50–56	
107	July 30	Reds	9–5	Vólquez (13–4)	Rodríguez (6–4)		30,272	50–57	

August

#	Date	Opponent	Score	Win	Loss	Save	Attendance	Record	Wrapup
108	August 1	Mets	7–3	Brocail (5–5)	Heilman (1–5)		41,083	51–57	
109	August 2	Mets	5–4	Valverde (5–3)	Heilman (1–6)		39,152	52–57	
110	August 3	Mets	4–0	Wolf (7–10)	Pérez (7–7)		38,602	53–57	
111	August 4	@ Cubs	2 – 0 ^{(8)}	Moehler (7–4)	Dempster (12–5)	Hawkins (1)	40,867	54–57	
112	August 5	@ Cubs	11–7	Howry (4–4)	Sampson (5–4)		40,416	54–58	
113	August 6	@ Cubs	11–4	Marquis (7–7)	Backe (6–11)		41,107	54–59	
114	August 7	@ Reds	7–4	Oswalt (9–8)	Fogg (2–4)		27,378	55–59	
115	August 8	@ Reds	9 – 5 ^{(10)}	Sampson (6–4)	Cordero (4–4)		25,652	56–59	
116	August 9	@ Reds	3–1	Moehler (8–4)	Arroyo (10–9)	Valverde (28)	26,044	57–59	
117	August 10	@ Reds	13–4	Rodríguez (7–4)	Harang (3–12)		30,789	58–59	
118	August 11	Giants	3–1	Backe (7–11)	Sánchez (8–9)	Valverde (29)	28,220	59–59	
118	August 12	Giants	12–4	Oswalt (10–8)	Walker (4–7)		29,451	60–59	
120	August 13	Giants	6–2	Wolf (8–10)	Zito (6–15)		30,330	61–59	
121	August 14	Giants	7–4	Hawkins (2–1)	Yabu (3–5)	Valverde (30)	33,612	62–59	
122	August 15	Diamondbacks	12–2	Webb (18–4)	Rodríguez (7–5)		36,035	62–60	
123	August 16	Diamondbacks	11–5	Petit (2–3)	Backe (7–12)		33,612	62–61	
124	August 17	Diamondbacks	3–0	Oswalt (11–8)	Johnson (10–9)	Valverde (31)	42,619	63–61	
125	August 18	@ Brewers	9–3	Sabathia (14–8)	Wolf (8–11)		41,991	63–62	
126	August 19	@ Brewers	5–2	Moehler (9–4)	Sheets (11–7)	Valverde (32)	41,662	64–62	
127	August 20	@ Brewers	5–2	Parra (10–6)	Rodríguez (7–6)	Torres (24)	41,419	64–63	
128	August 22	@ Mets	5–2	Santana (12–7)	Oswalt (11–9)	Ayala (1)	52,008	64–64	
129	August 23	@ Mets	8–3	Backe (8–12)	Maine (10–8)		51,766	65–64	
130	August 24	@ Mets	6–4	Hawkins (3–1)	Feliciano (2–4)	Valverde (33)	49,758	66–64	
131	August 25	@ Mets	9–1	Pelfrey (13–8)	Moehler (9–5)		41,419	66–65	
132	August 26	Reds	2–1	Arroyo (12–10)	Geary (2–3)		30,395	66–66	
133	August 27	Reds	4–1	Oswalt (12–9)	Fogg (2–7)	Valverde (34)	30,741	67–66	
134	August 28	Reds	3–2	Backe (9–12)	Harang (4–14)	Valverde (35)	30,028	68–66	
135	August 29	Cardinals	3–2	Brocail (6–5)	Springer (2–1)		33,347	69–66	
136	August 30	Cardinals	8–5	Moehler (10–5)	Looper (12–11)	Valverde (36)	37,569	70–66	
137	August 31	Cardinals	3–0	Rodríguez (8–6)	Wellemeyer (11–6)	Valverde (37)	35,638	71–66	

September

#	Date	Opponent	Score	Win	Loss	Save	Attendance	Record	Wrapup
138	September 1	@ Cubs	3–0	Oswalt (13–9)	Marquis (9–8)	Valverde (38)	40,670	72–66	
139	September 2	@ Cubs	9–7	Wright (8–6)	Wood (4–3)	Valverde (39)	39,846	73–66	
140	September 3	@ Cubs	4–0	Wolf (9–11)	Dempster (15–6)		40,163	74–66	
141	September 5	@ Rockies	5–3	Jiménez (10–12)	Moehler (10–6)	Fuentes (27)	26,163	74–67	
142	September 6	@ Rockies	2–0	Oswalt (14–9)	Francis (4–9)		32,352	75–67	
143	September 7	@ Rockies	7–5	Brocail (7–5)	Buchholz (6–5)	Valverde (40)	30,509	76–67	
144	September 8	Pirates	3–2	Arias (1–0)	Snell (6–11)	Valverde (41)	26,526	77–67	
145	September 9	Pirates	9–3	Wolf (10–11)	Ohlendorf (1–2)		30,034	78–67	
146	September 10	Pirates	7–4	Moehler (11–6)	Bautista (4–4)	Valverde (42)	26,859	79–67	
147	September 11	Pirates	6–0	Oswalt (15–9)	Duke (5–14)		31,101	80–67	
–	September 12	Cubs	Postponed (Hurricane Ike) Rescheduled for September 14 @ Miller Park.						
–	September 13	Cubs	Postponed (Hurricane Ike) Rescheduled for September 15 @ Miller Park.						
–	September 14	Cubs	Postponed (Hurricane Ike) Cancelled due to the Astros being eliminated from playoff contention and the Cubs winning the NL Central on September 20.						
148	September 14	Cubs*	5–0	Zambrano (14–5)	Wolf (10–12)		23,441	80–68	
149	September 15	Cubs*	6–1	Lilly (15–9)	Moehler (11–7)		15,158	80–69	
150	September 16	@ Marlins	5–1	Volstad (5–3)	Oswalt (15–10)		12,232	80–70	
151	September 17	@ Marlins	2–14	Nolasco (15–7)	Backe (9–13)		14,124	80–71	
152	September 18	@ Marlins	1-8	Olsen (8-10)	Arias (1-1)		14,219	80-72	
153	September 19	@ Pirates	5-1	Wolf (11-12)	Snell (6-12)		26,301	81-72	
154	September 20	@ Pirates	4-6	Davis (2-4)	Brian Moehler (11-8)	Capps (20)	36,621	81-73	
155	September 21	@ Pirates	6-2	Oswalt (16-10)	Ohlendorf (1-4)		20,311	82-73	
156	September 23	Reds	2-1	Volquez (17-6)	Rodríguez (8–7)	Cordero (34)	27,561	82-74	
157	September 24	Reds	5-0	Wolf (12-12)	Ramírez (1–1)		26,103	83-74	
158	September 25	Reds	8-7	Oswalt (17-10)	Cueto (9-14)	José Valverde (43)	31,204	84-74	
159	September 26	Braves	5-4	José Valverde (6-3)	Tavárez (1-5)		33,477	85-74	
160	September 27	Braves	5-11	Vladimir Núñez (1-2)	Backe (9-14)		37,491	85-75	
161	September 28	Braves	3-1	Rodríguez (9-7)	Hampton (3-4)	José Valverde (44)	37,113	86-75	

*At Miller Park in Milwaukee, Wisconsin

== Player statistics ==
Table legend
League leader
League top ten
Team leader

=== Batting ===
==== Starters by position ====
Note: Pos = Position; G = Games played; AB = At bats; H = Hits; Avg. = Batting average; HR = Home runs; RBI = Runs batted in

Pos	Player	G	AB	H	Avg.	HR	RBI
C	Brad Ausmus	81	216	47	.218	3	24
1B	Lance Berkman	159	554	173	.312	29	106
2B	Kazuo Matsui	96	375	110	.293	6	33
SS	Miguel Tejada	158	632	179	.283	13	66
3B	Ty Wigginton	111	386	110	.285	23	58
LF	Carlos Lee	115	436	137	.314	28	100
CF	Michael Bourn	138	467	107	.229	5	29
RF	Hunter Pence	157	595	160	.269	25	83

==== Other batters ====
Note: G = Games played; AB = At bats; H = Hits; Avg. = Batting average; HR = Home runs; RBI = Runs batted in

Player	G	AB	H	Avg.	HR	RBI
Geoff Blum	114	325	78	.240	14	53
Darin Erstad	140	322	89	.276	4	31
Mark Loretta	101	261	73	.280	4	38
Humberto Quintero	59	168	38	.226	2	12
J. R. Towles	54	146	20	.137	4	16
David Newhan	64	104	27	.260	2	12
Reggie Abercrombie	34	55	17	.309	2	5
José Cruz Jr.	38	49	6	.122	0	1
José Castillo	15	32	9	.281	0	2
Mark Saccomanno	10	10	2	.200	1	2
Tomás Pérez	8	10	2	.200	0	0
Edwin Maysonet	7	7	1	.143	0	0
J.R. House	3	3	0	.000	0	1

=== Pitching ===
==== Starting pitchers ====
Note: G = Games pitched; IP = Innings pitched; W = Wins; L = Losses; ERA = Earned run average; SO = Strikeouts

Player	G	IP	W	L	ERA	SO
Roy Oswalt	32	208.2	17	10	3.54	165
Brandon Backe	31	166.2	9	14	6.05	127
Brian Moehler	31	150.0	11	8	4.56	82
Wandy Rodríguez	25	137.1	9	7	3.54	131
Shawn Chacón	15	85.2	2	3	5.04	53
Randy Wolf	12	70.2	6	2	3.57	57
Runelvys Hernández	4	19.1	0	3	8.38	15

==== Other pitchers ====
Note: G = Games pitched; IP = Innings pitched; W = Wins; L = Losses; ERA = Earned run average; SO = Strikeouts

Player	G	IP	W	L	ERA	SO
Chris Sampson	54	117.1	6	4	4.22	61
Jack Cassel	9	30.1	1	1	5.64	14
Alberto Árias	3	8.0	1	1	6.75	8

==== Relief pitchers ====
Note: G = Games pitched; W = Wins; L = Losses; SV = Saves; ERA = Earned run average; SO = Strikeouts

Player	G	W	L	SV	ERA	SO
José Valverde	74	6	3	44	3.38	83
Doug Brocail	72	7	5	2	3.93	64
Wesley Wright	71	4	3	1	5.01	57
Tim Byrdak	59	2	1	0	3.90	47
Geoff Geary	55	2	3	0	2.53	45
Óscar Villarreal	35	1	3	0	5.02	21
Dave Borkowski	26	0	2	0	7.50	24
LaTroy Hawkins	24	2	0	1	0.43	25
Fernando Nieve	11	0	1	0	8.44	12
Chad Paronto	6	0	1	0	4.35	4

== Major League Baseball draft ==
Houston Astros 2008 MLB draft selections
Rd.	Slot	Draftee	Position	School	Origin	Signed	Notes	Bio
1	10	Jason Castro	Catcher	Stanford • 2008	(California)	Y	(Note: MLB debut on June 22, 2010, with Houston)	
1	38	Jordan Lyles	Right-handed pitcher	Hartsville HS	(South Carolina)	Y	(Note: Supplemental pick rendered for the Tampa Bay Rays signing free agent Trever Miller.) (Note: MLB debut on May 31, 2011, with Houston)	
—	—	Bill Blair	Left-handed pitcher	Prairie View A&M	(Texas)	N/A	(Note: Part of Negro leagues special draft of living former players.) (Note: Negro American League debut in 1948 with the Indianapolis Clowns)	

== Awards and achievements ==
=== Grand slams ===
Craig Biggio's number 7 was retired by the Houston Astros in August 17, 2008.

No.	Date	Astros batter	Venue	Inning	Pitcher	Opposing team	Box
1	May 20	Hunter Pence	Minute Maid Park	4 (Note: Tied score or took lead)	Dennis Dove	St. Louis Cardinals	
2	July 6	Ty Wigginton (Note: 1st MLB grand slam)	Turner Field	8	Charlie Morton	Atlanta Braves	
3	July 29	Carlos Lee	Minute Maid Park	5	Bronson Arroyo	Cincinnati Reds	
4	August 1	Mark Loretta	Minute Maid Park	8	Aaron Heilman	New York Mets	
5	August 12	Lance Berkman	Minute Maid Park	7	Jack Taschner	San Francisco Giants	
6	September 10	Miguel Tejada	Minute Maid Park	6	Denny Bautista	Pittsburgh Pirates	

=== Career honors ===
- Houston Astros uniform number retired—No. 7 : Craig Biggio, C/2B/CF • In Houston 1988–2007 • 2.850 games
- Hispanic Heritage Baseball Museum Hall of Fame Pioneer Award: Jesús Alou (Note: Played for the Houston Astros from 1969–1973, 1978, and 1979.)

=== Annual awards ===
2008 Houston Astros award winners
Name of award		Recipient	Ref
Darryl Kile Good Guy Award		Hunter Pence	
Delivery Man of the Month	August	José Valverde	
Fred Hartman Award for Long and Meritorious Service to Baseball		Neil Hohlfeld	
Houston Astros	Most Valuable Player (MVP)	Lance Berkman	
Houston Astros	Pitcher of the Year	José Valverde	
Houston Astros	Rookie of the Year	Wesley Wright	
MLB All-Star Game	Home Run Derby contestant	Lance Berkman	
MLB All-Star Game	Starting first baseman	Lance Berkman	
MLB All-Star Game	Reserve infielder	Miguel Tejada	
National League (NL) Player of the Month	May	Lance Berkman	
National League (NL) Player of the Week	April 27	Lance Berkman	
National League (NL) Player of the Week	May 11	Lance Berkman	
National League (NL) Player of the Week	August 10	Carlos Lee	
National League (NL) Player of the Week	August 17	Ty Wigginton (Note: Co-winner with Johan Santana of the New York Mets.)	
National League (NL) Player of the Week	September 7	Roy Oswalt (Note: Co-winner with Andre Ethier of the Los Angeles Dodgers.)	

Other awards results

Name of award	Voting recipient(s) (Team)	Ref.
Clutch Performer of the Year	Winner—Sabathia (NYY) • Finalist—Berkman (HOU)	
NL Most Valuable Player	1st—Pujols (STL) • 5th—Berkman (HOU); Other Astros: 24th—Valverde	
Roberto Clemente	Winner—Pujols (STL) • Nominee—Berkman (HOU)	
This Year in Baseball Best Closer	1st—Lidge (PHI) • 8th—Valverde (HOU)	

=== League leaders ===
NL batting leaders

- Double plays ground into: Miguel Tejada (32—led MLB)
- Doubles: Lance Berkman (46)

NL pitching leaders

- Earned runs allowed: Brandon Backe (112)
- Games finished: José Valverde (71—led MLB)
- Home runs allowed: Brandon Backe (36—led MLB)
- Saves: José Valverde (44)

NL fielding leaders

- Fielding percentage as first baseman: Lance Berkman (.996)
- Assists as shortstop: Miguel Tejada (442)
- Double plays turned as shortstop: Miguel Tejada (97)
- Assists as outfielder: Hunter Pence (16)
- Putouts as right fielder: Hunter Pence (340)
- Putouts as pitcher: Roy Oswalt (24)
- Fielding percentage as pitcher: Roy Oswalt (1.000)

== Minor league system ==
Level	Team	League	Manager
AAA	Round Rock Express	Pacific Coast League	Dave Clark
AA	Corpus Christi Hooks	Texas League	Luis Pujols
A	Salem Avalanche	Carolina League	Jim Pankovits
A	Lexington Legends	South Atlantic League	Gregg Langbehn
A-Short Season	Tri-City ValleyCats	New York–Penn League	Pete Rancont
Rookie	Greeneville Astros	Appalachian League	Rodney Linares

- Houston Astros Minor League Player of the Year: Drew Sutton

== See also ==
- List of Major League Baseball annual doubles leaders
- List of Major League Baseball annual saves leaders
- List of Major League Baseball players with a home run in their first major league at bat
- List of Major League Baseball retired numbers
- List of neutral site regular season Major League Baseball games played in the United States and Canada
