= Jack Cassel =

American baseball player (born 1980)

- Relief pitcher
- Born: August 8, 1980 (age 45); Los Angeles, California, U.S.
- Batted: Right Threw: Right

MLB debut
- August 10, 2007, for the San Diego Padres

Last MLB appearance
- September 27, 2008, for the Houston Astros

MLB statistics
- Win–loss record: 2–2
- Earned run average: 4.92
- Strikeouts: 25
- Stats at Baseball Reference

Teams
- San Diego Padres (2007); Houston Astros (2008)

Joseph "Jack" Buren Cassel II (born August 8, 1980) is an American former professional baseball pitcher. He played in Major League Baseball (MLB) for the San Diego Padres and Houston Astros. He retired from professional baseball in 2010 after suffering a career-ending shoulder injury.

== College career ==
Cassel attended Loyola Marymount University after graduating from John F. Kennedy High School in 1998, where he received All-State Honors in baseball. On February 9, 2008, Cassel's #14 jersey was retired by longtime coach, Manny Alvarado, and the John F. Kennedy Baseball program.

Cassel received his Master of Business Administration from the University of Southern California.

== Professional career ==
=== San Diego Padres ===
==== Minor leagues ====
Cassel was drafted in the 25th round, with the 739th overall selection, of the 2000 Major League Baseball draft by the San Diego Padres and signed. He split his first professional season between the rookie-level Idaho Falls Padres and Single-A Fort Wayne Wizards, recording a cumulative 3.86 ERA with 38 strikeouts over 29 appearances. Cassel returned to Fort Wayne for the 2001 season, making 25 appearances (23 starts) in which he compiled a 4-14 record and 5.54 ERA with 89 strikeouts across 128 1/3 innings pitched.

Cassel split the 2002 campaign between Fort Wayne and the High—A Lake Elsinore Storm, posting a combined 5-2 record and 2.77 ERA with 59 strikeouts in 89 2/3 innings pitched across 50 appearances out of the bullpen. He returned to Lake Elsinore for the 2003 season, registering a 5-4 record and 3.59 ERA with 52 strikeouts and three saves in 72 2/3 innings pitched across 64 games. In 2003, Cassel was awarded the Lake Elsinore Storm Pitcher of the Year award.

In 2004, Cassel made 57 relief outings for the Double-A Mobile BayBears, compiling a 4-2 record and 3.74 ERA with 52 strikeouts across 74 2/3 innings pitched. He split 2005 between Mobile and the Triple-A Portland Beavers, accumulating a 6-5 record and 3.95 ERA with 50 strikeouts in 82 innings pitched across 47 games (six starts). Following the season, Cassel pitched for the Peoria Javelinas in the Arizona Fall League. In 2006, Cassel made 30 appearances (23 starts) split between Mobile and Portland, registering a 9-8 record and 4.35 ERA with 119 strikeouts over 155 innings of work.

Cassel made 27 appearances (24 starts) for Portland in 2007, logging a 7-14 record and 3.91 ERA with 117 strikeouts across 156 2/3 innings pitched. He represented Portland at the Pacific Coast League All-Star Game in Albuquerque, New Mexico. Cassel hosted a variety of radio shows throughout his time in the minor leagues. During the 2005-2007 seasons, he hosted the Toyota Pre-Game Show with Rich Burke on the weekends in Portland, Oregon.

==== Major leagues ====
Cassel made his MLB debut for the Padres on August 10, 2007 against the Cincinnati Reds. He struck out the first batter he faced, Álex González, and surrendered his first hit to Ken Griffey Jr. He was sent back down to Triple-A the next day however, after he gave up two runs in three innings in his debut. On August 31, Cassel was recalled to the major league club and made his first career start against the Los Angeles Dodgers. Cassel pitched 5 2/3 innings, gave up three runs on 10 hits with five strikeouts, and was awarded a no decision. He earned his first major league win on September 17, beating the Pittsburgh Pirates by pitching six scoreless innings. On September 27, Cassel recorded his first hit against Milwaukee Brewers right hander Yovani Gallardo on an infield single. In six appearances for San Diego during his rookie campaign, Cassel logged a 1-1 record and 3.97 ERA with 11 strikeouts across 22 2/3 innings pitched.

Cassel was not offered a new contract by the Padres and became a free agent on December 12, 2007.

=== Houston Astros ===
On December 16, 2007, Cassel signed a minor league contract with the Houston Astros organization. He competed for a spot in the starting rotation in spring training, but began the year in the minor leagues. Cassel was promoted shortly thereafter and earned his first win of 2008, beating the Cincinnati Reds. He made nine appearances (three starts) for Houston during the year, posting a 1-1 record and 5.64 ERA with 14 strikeouts across 30 1/3 innings pitched.

On October 8, 2008, Cassel was removed from the 40-man roster and sent outright to the Triple-A Round Rock Express; he subsequently elected free agency in lieu of the assignment.

=== Cleveland Indians ===
Cassel signed a minor league contract with the Cleveland Indians on January 11, 2009. On April 19, Cassel earned the very first win in the new Huntington Park in Columbus, Ohio as a pitcher for the Triple-A Columbus Clippers. In 15 starts for Columbus, he posted a 5-7 record and 5.78 ERA with 51 strikeouts across 90 1/3 innings pitched. Cassel elected free agency following the season on November 9.

While with Columbus, Cassel suffered a shoulder injury that ultimately ended his playing career.

== International career ==
Cassel also pitched in the Caribbean Winter Leagues. In 2006, he pitched for the Atenienses de Manatí in Puerto Rico. He was elected to Puerto Rican All-Star Game and led the league with the lowest ERA (1.89). In 2009–10, Cassel pitched for the Águilas Cibaeñas in Santiago de los Caballeros. Following the regular season, he was traded to the Toros del Este in La Romana for the playoffs. The team lost in the championship to the Gigantes del Cibao.

== Personal life ==
Jack's younger brother, Matt Cassel, is a former journeyman American football quarterback who notably played with the New England Patriots and Kansas City Chiefs. His other younger brother, Justin Cassel, played in minor league baseball player for the Chicago White Sox organization, and won a silver medal for Team USA. In 1999, Justin was on the HBO reality television show Freshman Year.

Cassel's wife, Julie Mariani Cassel, is also a former athlete; she was a captain and defensive Specialist on the 2002 NCAA Championship USC Women's Volleyball team.

In a strange coincidence on September 7, 2008, Jack replaced injured teammate Wandy Rodríguez in the first inning at Colorado only hours after his brother Matt replaced injured teammate Tom Brady in the first quarter of the season-opening game against the Kansas City Chiefs. They were the first pair of brothers to win games in two different major sports on the same day.

In 2007, Cassel's mother, Barbara Brennan Cassel, won a Television Emmy Award for her work as a Set Decorator on Tony Bennett: An American Classic. In 2008, Cassel's father Gregory died suddenly at his home in California. He was an actor and screenplay writer. Cassel's grandfather, Joe B. Cassel, was inducted into the Racing Tent Hall of Fame for the IAHA in 1996 and was inducted into the Texas Horse Racing Hall of Fame in 2002. He was the recipient of the Arabian Lifetime Breeders Award in 2001.

== Community ==
Cassel and fellow baseball player Chris Dickerson are the founders of Players for the Planet, a charitable organization that brings professional athletes together to inspire communities to build awareness of the growing environmental crisis. Several athletes including Jay Bruce, Ryan Braun, Matt Cassel, Curtis Granderson are on board to spread the awareness.

On July 19, 2012, Cassel was invited to the White House for the "White House Sports and Sustainability Forum"
