= Freshman Year =

Freshman year is the first year of high school or college.

Freshman Year may also refer to:

- Freshman Year (Hop Along album), a 2006 album by Hop Along
- Freshman Year (album), a 2019 album by The Reklaws
- Freshman Year (film), a 1938 film
- Shithouse (film), a 2020 film released under the title Freshman Year in certain territories
- Freshman Year (reality show), a political reality show starring Jason Chaffetz and Jared Polis that CNN aired on the internet in 2009
