= Chris Sampson =

American baseball player (born 1978)

- Pitcher
- Born: May 23, 1978 (age 48); Channelview, Texas, U.S.
- Batted: Right Threw: Right

MLB debut
- June 2, 2006, for the Houston Astros

Last MLB appearance
- July 24, 2010, for the Houston Astros

MLB statistics
- Win–loss record: 20–15
- Earned run average: 4.42
- Strikeouts: 176
- Stats at Baseball Reference

Teams
- Houston Astros (2006–2010)

Christopher Keith Sampson (born May 23, 1978) is an American former Major League Baseball right-handed pitcher. He attended Texas Tech University, where he played for the Red Raiders. Sampson stands 6 feet 0 inches (1.83 m).

== Career ==
Sampson originally began his professional baseball career in the late 1990s as a shortstop. After batting .239, and hitting only one home run during the 1999 season in Class A baseball, Sampson decided to retire since his chances of making the Major Leagues were slim due to his poor batting stats. In the years following his retirement, he coached baseball for Collin College in Plano, Texas, just outside Dallas, where he would frequently throw batting practice. It was then that he realized his potential as a pitcher.

In 2003, Sampson contacted the Astros for a try-out as a pitcher. Astros Assistant General Manager Tim Purpura was impressed with Sampson's pitching ability and signed him to a minor league contract. Sampson developed as a pitcher, and impressed the Astros with his performance at Triple A Round Rock Express where he began the 2006 baseball season with a 7-1 record and a 2.64 ERA in 10 starts. His performance resulted in the Astros purchasing Sampson's contract on June 1, 2006. He made his debut the next day when he entered a blowout game for the Houston Astros against the Cincinnati Reds in relief of starting pitcher Wandy Rodriguez.

Sampson made his first Major League start for the Astros on June 7, 2006. He threw a no-hitter into the fifth inning and eventually gave up three hits and no runs in seven innings pitched on his way to a 1-0 win over the Chicago Cubs. In this effort he recorded no strikeouts; 16 of his 21 batters retired were put away on ground balls. The only run came from a Brad Ausmus home run.

Coming out of spring training, Sampson was named the 5th starter in the Astros rotation for the 2007 season. He remained with the Astros through the 2010 season when he became a free agent.

Sampson signed a minor league contract with the Colorado Rockies for the 2011 season but was released after spring training.

On April 23, 2011, Sampson signed a minor league contract with the Florida Marlins.

== Personal life ==
Sampson was married at home plate of Minute Maid Park over the 2006–2007 offseason.

On May 15, 2007, Sampson was with his wife, Heather, as she delivered the couple's first child, an eight-pound, 14-ounce boy named C.J. The next day, Sampson pitched six innings, giving up seven hits and allowing one run while striking out Barry Bonds in a 2-1 victory. Before the game, the umpires made him take off his hospital wristband.
