= Mark Saccomanno =

American baseball player (born 1980)

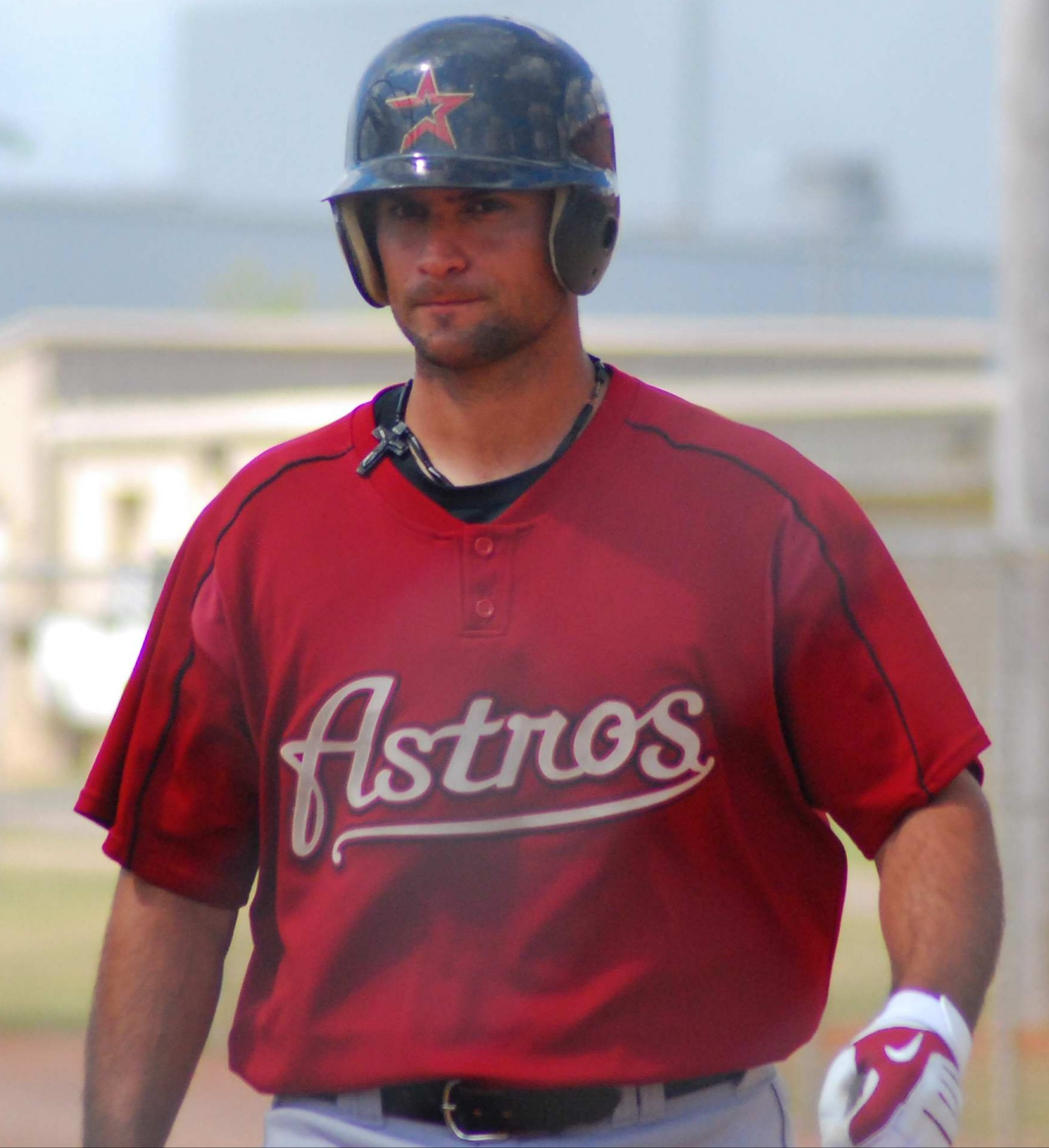
- Saccomanno with the Houston Astros
- First baseman
- Born: April 30, 1980 (age 46); Houston, Texas, U.S.
- Batted: Right Threw: Right

MLB debut
- September 8, 2008, for the Houston Astros

Last MLB appearance
- September 28, 2008, for the Houston Astros

MLB statistics
- Batting average: .200
- Home runs: 1
- Runs batted in: 2
- Stats at Baseball Reference

Teams
- Houston Astros (2008)

Career highlights and awards
- Hit a home run in first major league at-bat

Mark Edison Saccomanno (born April 30, 1980) is an American former professional baseball first baseman. He played in Major League Baseball (MLB) for the Houston Astros in 2008. He represented Italy in the 2006 World Baseball Classic.

== Career ==
=== Amateur ===
At 17, Saccomanno was awarded the Klein Forest High School Golden Glove award. He was also selected to the 17-and-under AAU National All-Tournament Team. At 18, was named Second-Team All-District 16-5A as a shortstop and received the National Scholar Athlete Award. He played college baseball for Baylor University.

=== Professional ===
Saccomanno was selected in the 23rd round (689th overall) of the 2003 Major League Baseball draft by the Houston Astros.

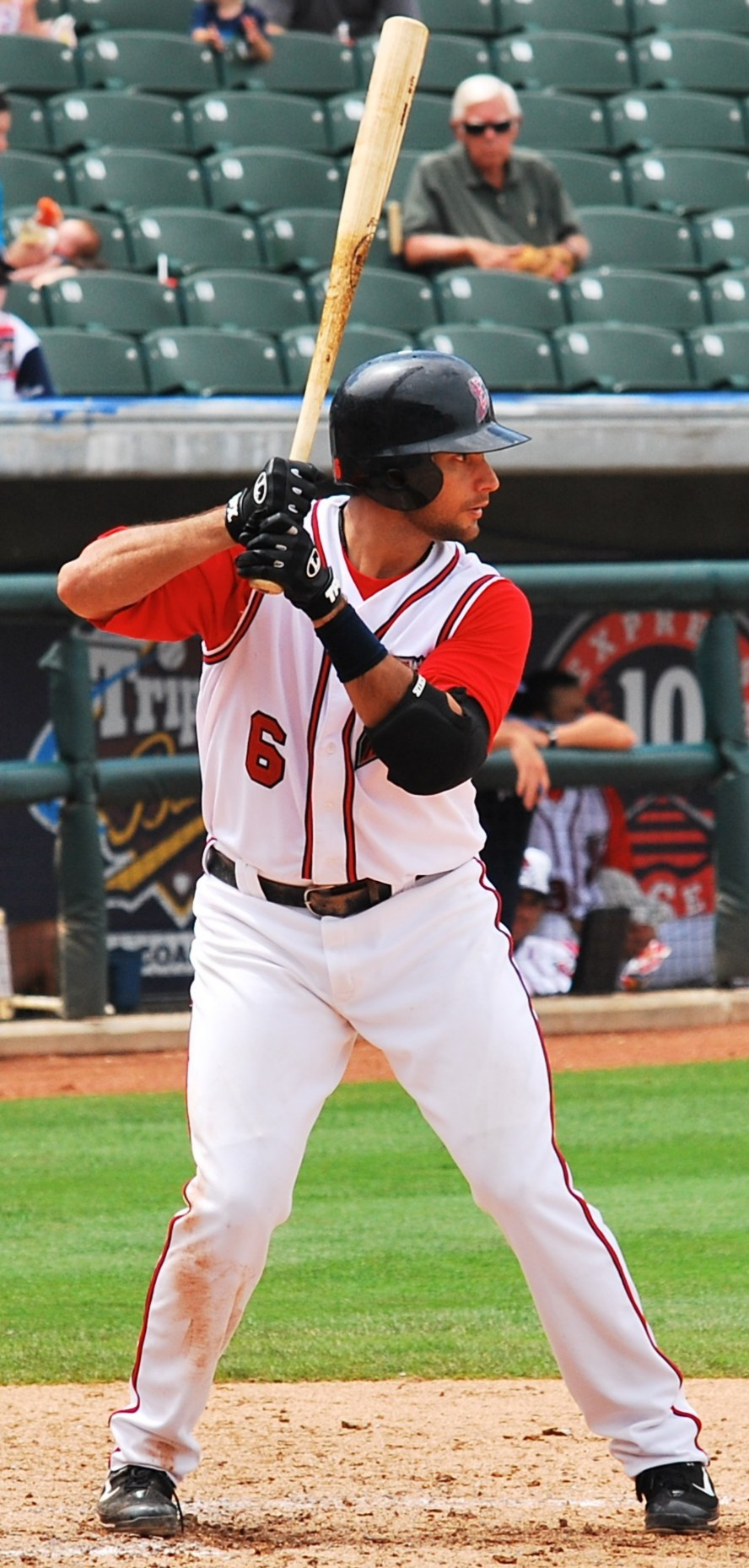
Saccomanno batting for the Round Rock Express in 2009

Saccomanno was called up to the majors by the Houston Astros on September 8, 2008, and hit a home run on the first pitch of his first major league at-bat, pinch hit for pitcher Alberto Árias, against Pirates' pitcher Ian Snell. A free agent at the end of the season, he re-signed with the Astros on January 5, 2009 to a minor league contract that included an invitation to spring training as a non-roster invitee.

== See also ==
- Home run in first Major League at-bat
