= Charles Morton =

Charles Morton or Charlie Morton may refer to:

== People ==
- Charles Morton (educator) (1627–1698), English nonconformist minister, founder of a dissenting academy, later associated with Harvard College
- Charles Morton (librarian) (1716–1799), English medical doctor and librarian
- Charles Morton (impresario) (1819–1904), English theatre and music hall manager, known as The Father of the Halls
- Charles Morton (editor) (1899–1967), author and associate editor of The Atlantic Monthly
- Charles Morton (actor) (1908–1966), American actor
- Charles Morton (cyclist) (1916–1996), American Olympic cyclist
- Charles Morton (racehorse trainer) (1855–1936), British racehorse trainer
- Charlie Morton (baseball manager) (Charles Hazen Morton, 1854–1921), American baseball outfielder, manager, and executive
- Charlie Morton (pitcher) (born 1983), American baseball player
- C. Brinkley Morton (1926–1994), bishop of the Episcopal Diocese of San Diego
- Charles B. Morton (1833–1922), American politician
- Charles Gould Morton (1861–1933), U.S. Army general

== Military ==
- USS General C. G. Morton, transport ship named for Charles Gould Morton

== See also ==
- Sir Charles Forbes (Royal Navy officer) (Charles Morton Forbes, 1880–1960), British admiral
