= Edwin Maysonet =

Puerto Rican baseball player (born 1981)

- Infielder
- Born: October 17, 1981 (age 44); Arecibo, Puerto Rico
- Batted: Right Threw: Right

MLB debut
- September 7, 2008, for the Houston Astros

Last MLB appearance
- June 19, 2012, for the Milwaukee Brewers

MLB statistics
- Batting average: .265
- Home runs: 2
- Runs batted in: 11
- Stats at Baseball Reference

Teams
- Houston Astros (2008–2009); Milwaukee Brewers (2012)

Edwin Maysonet (born October 17, 1981) is a Puerto Rican former professional baseball infielder. He has played parts of two seasons in Major League Baseball (MLB) for the Houston Astros in 2008–2009 and part of one season for the Milwaukee Brewers in 2012.

== Career ==
Maysonet was drafted by the Houston Astros in the 19th round of the 2003 Major League Baseball draft out of Delta State University. He played that season for their Class A (Short Season) Tri-City ValleyCats. In 2004, he played for the Class A Lexington Legends. He split the 2005 season between Lexington and the Class A-Advanced Salem Avalanche. He returned to Salem for the entire 2006 season. He played the entire 2007 season with the Double-A Corpus Christi Hooks. He played the majority of the 2008 season with the Triple-A Round Rock Express, but was called up by the Astros on Sept. 1. He made his major league debut on September 7. Maysonet played 39 games for Houston in 2009 but played the rest of the season with Round Rock. Besides a brief rehab assignment with the Gulf Coast League Astros in 2010, Maysonet played most of his 2010 season with Round Rock.

He was granted free agency after the 2010 season. On December 20, 2010, the Milwaukee Brewers signed him to a minor league deal with an invitation to spring training in 2011.

Maysonet was called up to the Brewers from Triple-A on May 5, 2012.

Maysonet hit a grand slam on May 12, 2012. It was his second career home run and the first grand slam for the Brewers in the 2012 season. It came against the Cubs in the bottom of the sixth inning, giving the Brewers a 6–1 lead.

On March 18, 2014, Maysonet signed with the Somerset Patriots of the Atlantic League of Professional Baseball. In 95 games he struggled hitting .226/.270/.307 with 4 home runs, 26 RBIs and 12 stolen bases. He became a free agent following the season.

== See also ==
- List of Major League Baseball players from Puerto Rico
