= Ty Wigginton =

American baseball player (born 1977)

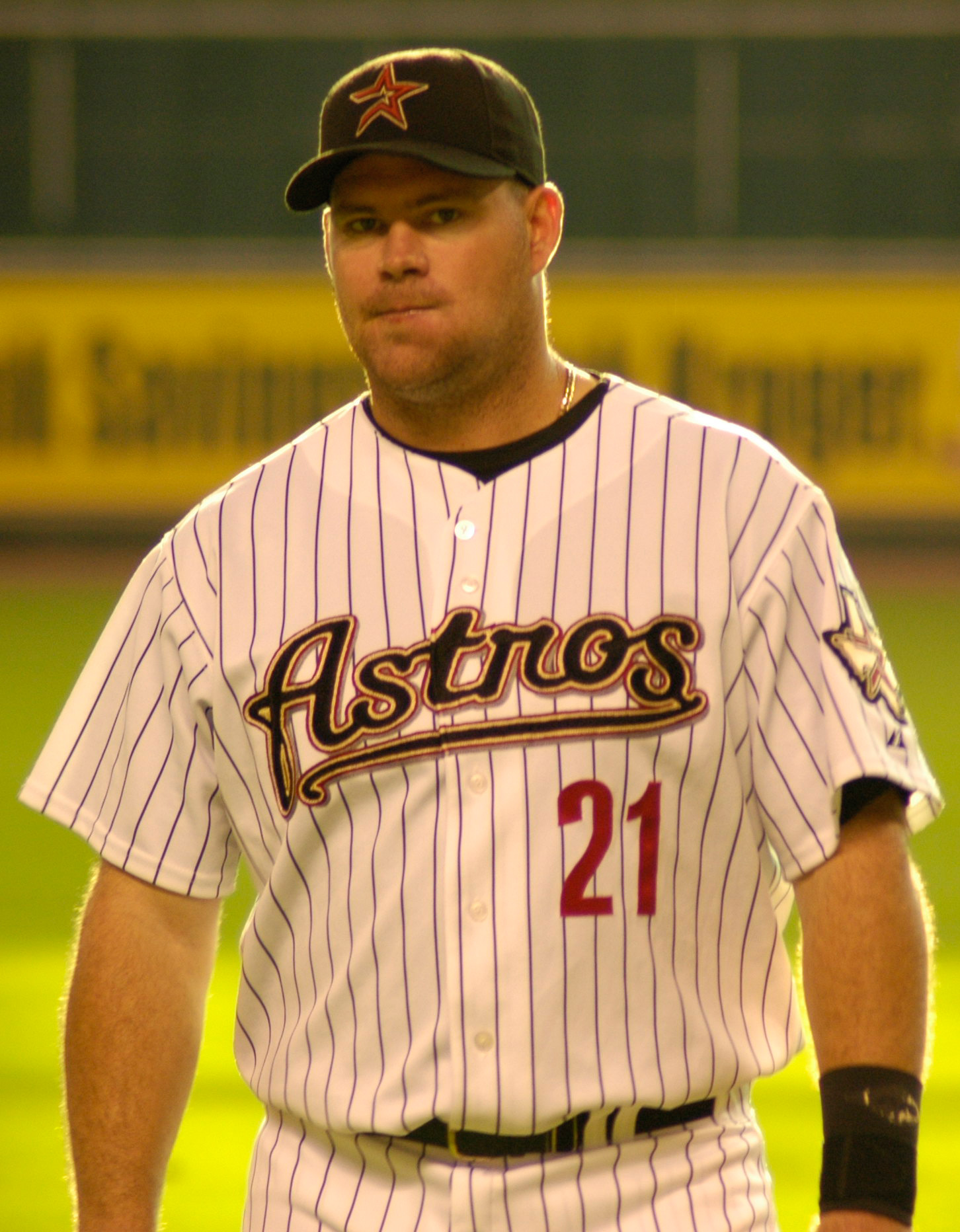
- Wigginton with the Houston Astros
- Infielder
- Born: October 11, 1977 (age 48); San Diego, California, U.S.
- Batted: Right Threw: Right

MLB debut
- May 16, 2002, for the New York Mets

Last MLB appearance
- July 5, 2013, for the St. Louis Cardinals

MLB statistics
- Batting average: .261
- Home runs: 169
- Runs batted in: 594
- Stats at Baseball Reference

Teams
- New York Mets (2002–2004); Pittsburgh Pirates (2004–2005); Tampa Bay Devil Rays (2006–2007); Houston Astros (2007–2008); Baltimore Orioles (2009–2010); Colorado Rockies (2011); Philadelphia Phillies (2012); St. Louis Cardinals (2013)

Career highlights and awards
- All-Star (2010)

Ty Allen Wigginton (born October 11, 1977) is an American former professional baseball infielder. He played in Major League Baseball (MLB) for the New York Mets, Pittsburgh Pirates, Tampa Bay Devil Rays, Houston Astros, Baltimore Orioles, Colorado Rockies, Philadelphia Phillies, and St. Louis Cardinals. He mainly played as a first and third baseman, but also platooned as an infielder and an outfielder during his career. He batted and threw right-handed.

== Early life ==
Wigginton attended Chula Vista High School in Chula Vista, California, and was a letter-man in football and baseball. Wigginton graduated from Chula Vista High School in 1995.

== Baseball career ==
Wigginton attended UNC-Asheville and played for three years from 1996 to 1998. Wigginton still holds the school's records for most home runs in a game, most runs in a season, and most doubles in a season.

=== New York Mets ===
The 6-foot (1.8 m) 200-pound Wigginton was selected in the 17th round by the New York Mets in the 1998 Major League Baseball draft.

Wigginton was called up to the Mets major league roster for the first time in 2002 as a third baseman and had a promising partial rookie season with the Mets, batting .302 with a .354 on-base percentage (OBP) and .526 slugging percentage (SLG) in 116 at-bats. He slumped somewhat in his first full season in 2003 with a batting line of .255/.318/.396 in 573 at-bats but started the 2004 season hot. In his first 312 at-bats, Wigginton hit .285/.334/.487, hitting 12 home runs and 23 doubles with 42 runs batted in.

=== Pittsburgh Pirates ===
On July 30, 2004, the Mets traded Wigginton to the Pittsburgh Pirates in a six-player deal for pitcher Kris Benson. Wigginton slumped badly after he was traded before recovering somewhat in September. In 2004, for the second straight year, he had the lowest zone rating of any NL third baseman (.731).

He started at third base for the Pirates in 2005 but again struggled and was demoted to the minor leagues on June 4, putting his future with Pittsburgh in doubt. After winning the International League Batter of the Week for the week of August 15–21, "Wiggy" was called up to the Pirates on August 22, 2005. The utility infielder caught fire, hitting .365 over his last 22 games for Pittsburgh. Despite this, the Pirates released him after the season.

=== Tampa Bay Devil Rays ===
Wigginton signed a one-year contract with the Tampa Bay Devil Rays on January 10, 2006. He split his time between first base and second base in 2006 with a few starts at third base and in the outfield. He signed a three-year deal with the Tampa Bay Rays after the 2006 season.

=== Houston Astros ===
On July 28, 2007, Wigginton was traded to the Houston Astros for pitcher Dan Wheeler. After his acquisition, Morgan Ensberg was designated for assignment, and Wigginton was announced as the Astros' starting third baseman. When Astros outfielder Carlos Lee had his finger broken by a pitch on August 9, 2008, Wigginton made the majority of the starts in left field in Lee's place. Wigginton ended up having a strong month of August, hitting .379 and posting a staggering 1.200 OPS. He was named the National League's co-Player of the Week along with Johan Santana for the period of August 11 to August 17; he had a .571 batting average with four home runs in that span. On December 12, 2008, the Astros failed to tender Wigginton a contract and he became a free agent, a controversial move that upset many Astros fans.

=== Baltimore Orioles ===
On February 10, 2009, Wigginton signed a two-year contract with the Baltimore Orioles.

He hit very well during the early stages of the 2010 season, batting .272 through his first 60 games and ranking eighth in the American League with 13 home runs.

Wigginton was elected to his 1st All-Star Game in 2010, being the lone Oriole representative. Wigginton had started the season without a starting position in Baltimore.

He split games between third base and first base following the trade of Miguel Tejada.

=== Colorado Rockies ===
On December 7, 2010, Wigginton signed a two-year deal with the Colorado Rockies with an option for a third year.

On April 20, 2011, Wigginton collected his 1000th career hit, a home run off of Matt Cain of the San Francisco Giants. The home run was his first as a member of the Rockies.

On June 28, 2011, Wigginton and Troy Tulowitzki helped the Rockies win 3–2 in 13 innings. Ty Wigginton was up at bat against Chicago White Sox reliever Will Ohman. Tulowitzki, at first, was off with the pitch. Wigginton flared a ball into center that dropped for a base hit. Brent Lillibridge picked it up as Tulowitzki tried to score the walk-off run. The throw to A. J. Pierzynski was off the line. Tulowitzki slid into the plate just ahead of Pierzynski's tag to score the walk-off.

=== Philadelphia Phillies ===
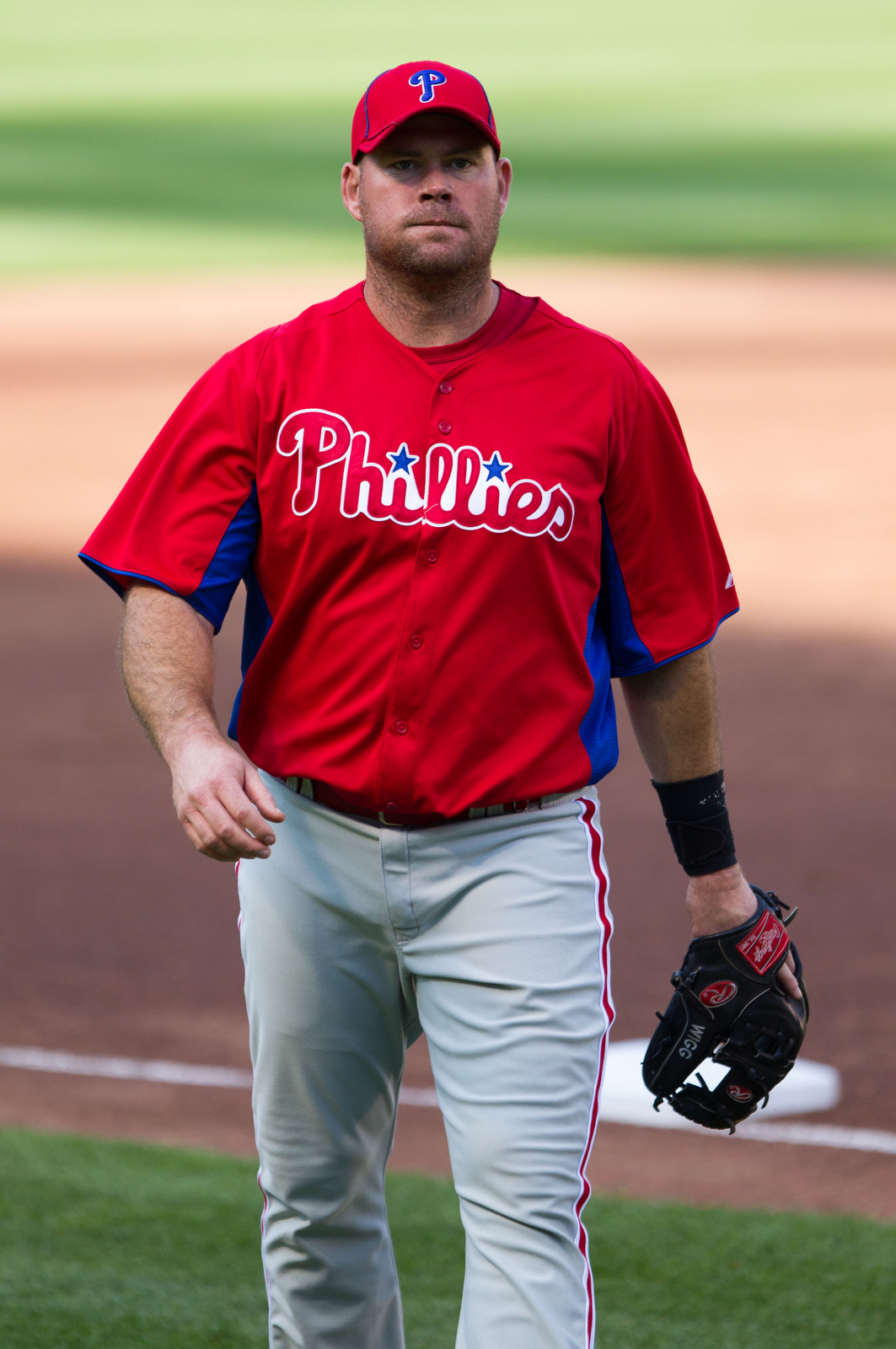
With the Phillies in 2012

On November 20, 2011, the Rockies traded Wigginton to the Philadelphia Phillies for a player to be named later or cash. On October 29, 2012, the Phillies declined his 2013 club option worth $4 million; he was paid a $500,000 buyout and became a free agent. In his lone season with the Phillies, he hit .235/.314/.375 in 125 games with 11 home runs.

=== St. Louis Cardinals ===
On December 14, 2012, the St. Louis Cardinals signed Wigginton to a two-year contract. According to Ken Rosenthal of FoxSports.com, the deal was worth $5 million over the two seasons. He was signed to serve as a utility infielder and outfielder. He performed poorly off the bench, hitting .158 in 47 games and 57 at-bats. On July 9, 2013, he was given his unconditional release.

=== Miami Marlins ===
Wigginton signed a minor league deal with the Miami Marlins on January 24, 2014. He was released on March 25.

== Scouting report ==
Wigginton showed slightly below-average power for a major league third baseman in his early career but displayed increased power as his career went on, ultimately averaging 20 home runs per 162 games played. He cut down on his strikeouts in 2004 and increased his number of walks, but his plate discipline was still no better than average. He hit fastballs well but struggled a little bit with good breaking balls. Wigginton had about average speed; he stole 12 bases in 2003 but never duplicated that (even in the minor leagues). On the field, he was slightly below average at third base. He also played second base, primarily in the earlier part of his career, but was similarly limited defensively at that position. He also played first and the outfield corners and was decent at first but has struggled in very limited playing time in the outfield.

Through the end of his major league career in July 2013, Wigginton had played in 1,362 major league games and hit .261 (1,170-for-4,479) with a .323 OBP, .435 SLG, 169 home runs, 245 doubles, 594 RBI, and 42 stolen bases.

== Personal life ==
On December 20, 2006, Wigginton was forced to handle the delivery of his son Cannon at home when his wife Angela went into labor unexpectedly. Following the instructions of an operator on 9-1-1, he delivered the baby in a bedroom closet of their North Carolina home and tied off the umbilical cord with one of his shoelaces.

In an August 2015 Mooresville Weekly article, Wigginton was named the new head baseball coach for Lake Norman High School in Mooresville, North Carolina, replacing Trey Ramsey.

Preceded by Eric Hinske	Topps Rookie All-Star Third Baseman; 2003	Succeeded by Chad Tracy
