= Wesley Wright =

American baseball player (born 1985)

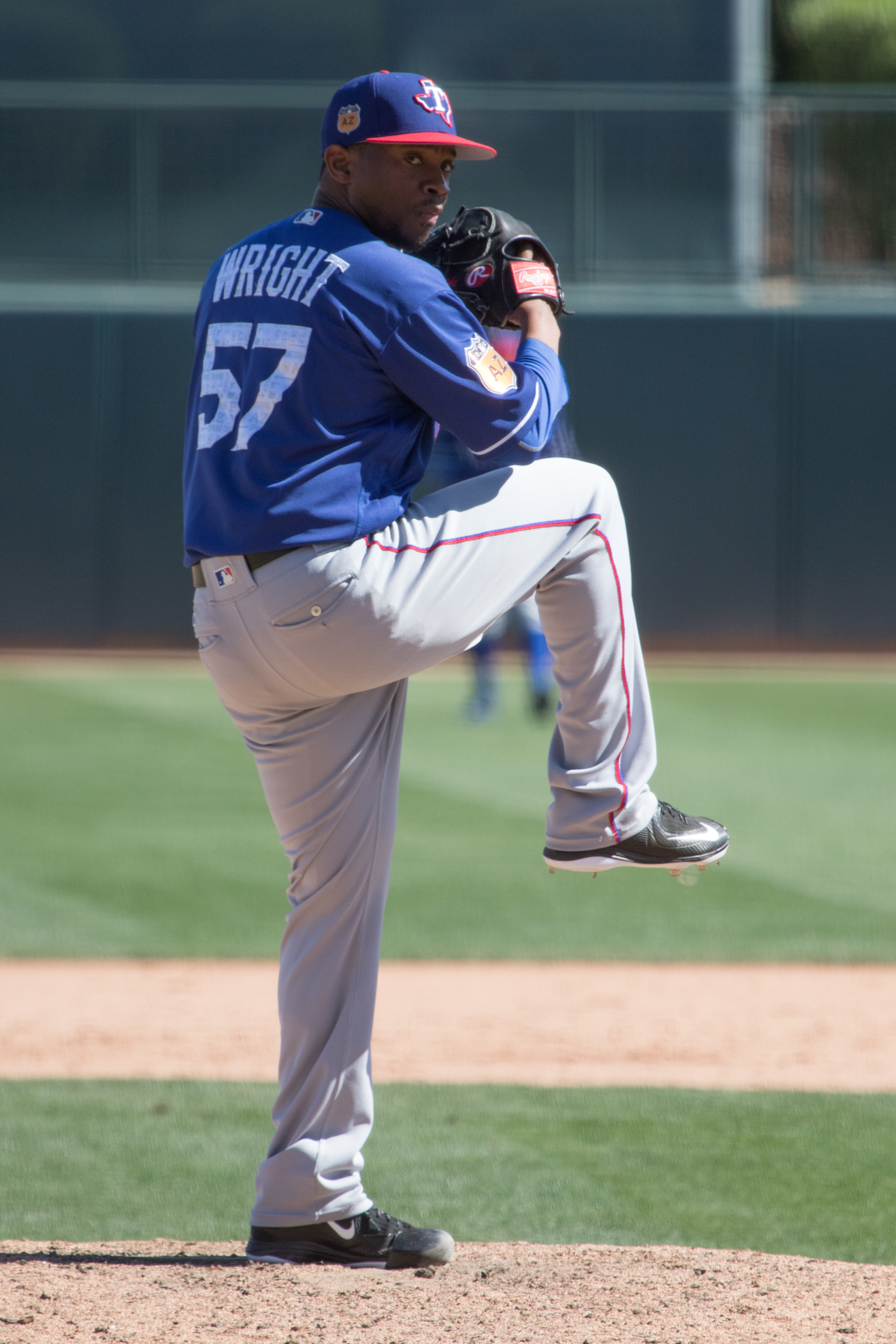
- Wright with the Texas Rangers in 2017
- Pitcher
- Born: January 28, 1985 (age 41); Montgomery, Alabama, U.S.
- Batted: Right Threw: Left

MLB debut
- March 31, 2008, for the Houston Astros

Last MLB appearance
- October 4, 2015, for the Los Angeles Angels of Anaheim

MLB statistics
- Win–loss record: 10–18
- Earned run average: 4.16
- Strikeouts: 295
- Stats at Baseball Reference

Teams
- Houston Astros (2008–2013); Tampa Bay Rays (2013); Chicago Cubs (2014); Baltimore Orioles (2015); Los Angeles Angels of Anaheim (2015)

Dequam LaWesley Wright (born January 28, 1985) is an American former professional baseball relief pitcher. He played in Major League Baseball (MLB) for the Houston Astros, Tampa Bay Rays, Chicago Cubs, Baltimore Orioles, and Los Angeles Angels of Anaheim.

== Early life ==
Wright was born in Montgomery, Alabama, and he grew up in a Montgomery County community known as Grady. He attended Goshen High School.

== Professional career ==
=== Los Angeles Dodgers ===
Wright was selected by the Los Angeles Dodgers in the 7th round (211th overall) of the 2003 Major League Baseball draft. He had a scholarship offer from the University of South Alabama, but he signed with the Dodgers organization instead. He made his professional debut with the Ogden Raptors in the Pioneer League in 2004 and played for the Columbus Catfish and Vero Beach Dodgers in 2005. With Columbus, Wright pitched in 30 games and accumulated a 1.93 ERA as a relief pitcher.

In 2006, Wright pitched in 25 games with Vero Beach, acquiring a 1.48 ERA and was subsequently promoted to the Jacksonville Suns, where he began 2007 before a mid-season promotion to the Las Vegas 51s.

=== Houston Astros ===
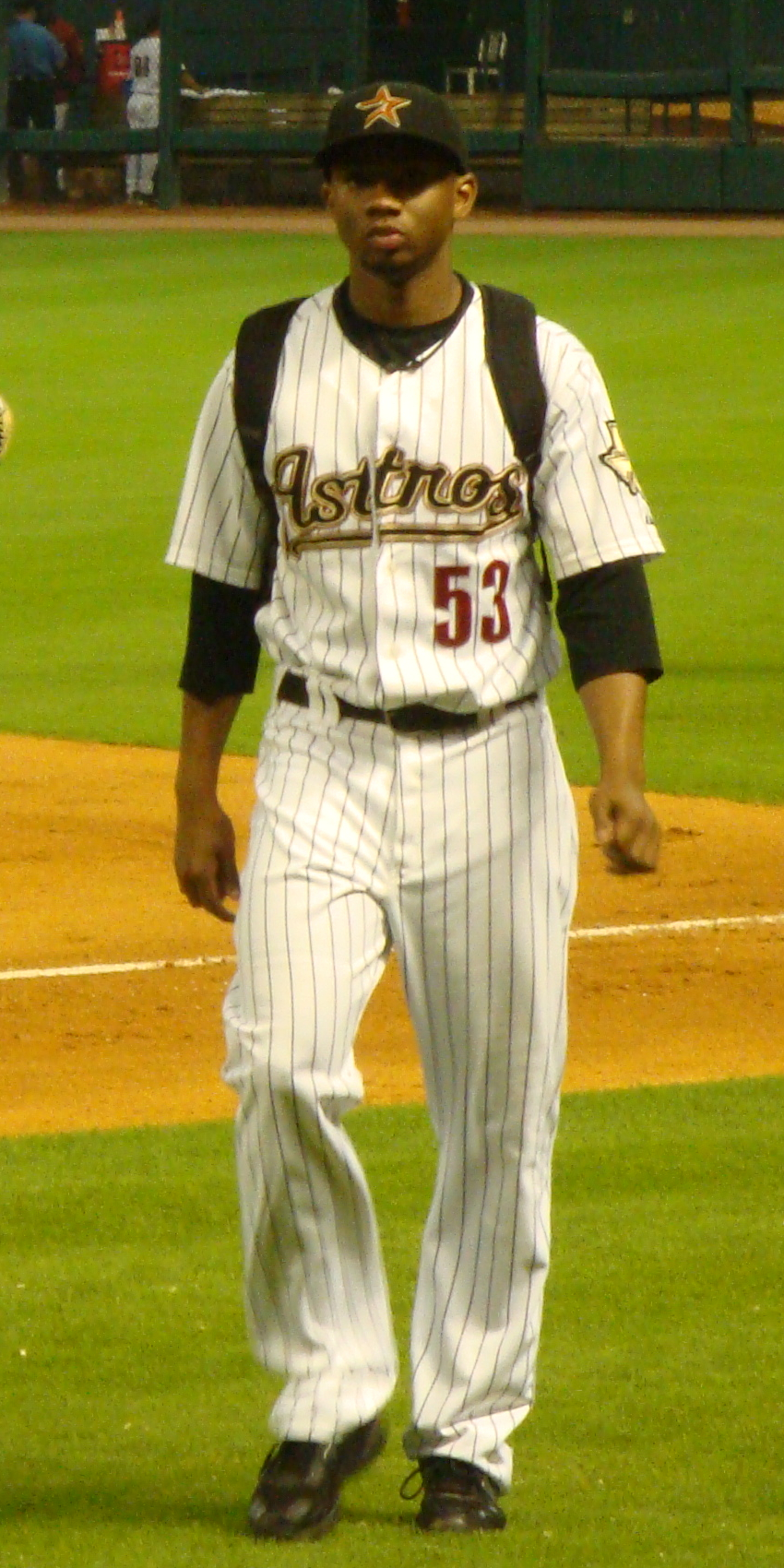
Wright with the Houston Astros in 2009

On December 6, 2007, Wright was selected by the Houston Astros in the major league portion of the Rule 5 draft from the Los Angeles Dodgers. Wright made the Astros' 2008 Opening Day roster as the only left-handed pitcher in the bullpen. On March 31, 2008, Wright made his major league debut against the San Diego Padres and pitched 1/3 of a scoreless inning. Wright collected his first major league win on April 4, against the Chicago Cubs after pitching 1/3 of a scoreless inning again. He collected his first major league save on July 29, against the Cincinnati Reds coming in during 9th inning with two outs, and recorded the final out of the game for the save. Wright made 71 appearances for Houston during his rookie campaign, compiling a 4-3 record and 5.01 ERA with 57 strikeouts and one save across 55 2/3 innings pitched.

On July 16, 2009, Wright was called in to pitch in a game against the Chicago Cubs in the second inning after starter Roy Oswalt was forced from the game by a strained back. Wright batted in the top of the third inning and singled to left field for his first Major League hit. Later that night, it was reported that he was rushed to the hospital after showing signs of appendicitis; he was diagnosed with dehydration. Wright made 49 appearances for Houston, posting a 3-4 record and 5.44 ERA with 47 strikeouts across 44 2/3 innings pitched.

Wright pitched in 14 games (four starts) for Houston in 2010, logging a 1-2 record and 5.73 ERA with 29 strikeouts over 33 innings of work. He appeared in 21 contests for the Astros during the 2011 season, recording a 1.50 ERA with 11 strikeouts over 12 innings of work.

Wright made 77 appearances out of the bullpen for Houston during the 2012 campaign, compiling a 2-2 record and 3.27 ERA with 54 strikeouts and one save across 52 1/3 innings pitched. He began the 2013 season with the Astros, logging an 0-4 record and 3.92 ERA with 40 strikeouts across 54 appearances.

=== Tampa Bay Rays ===
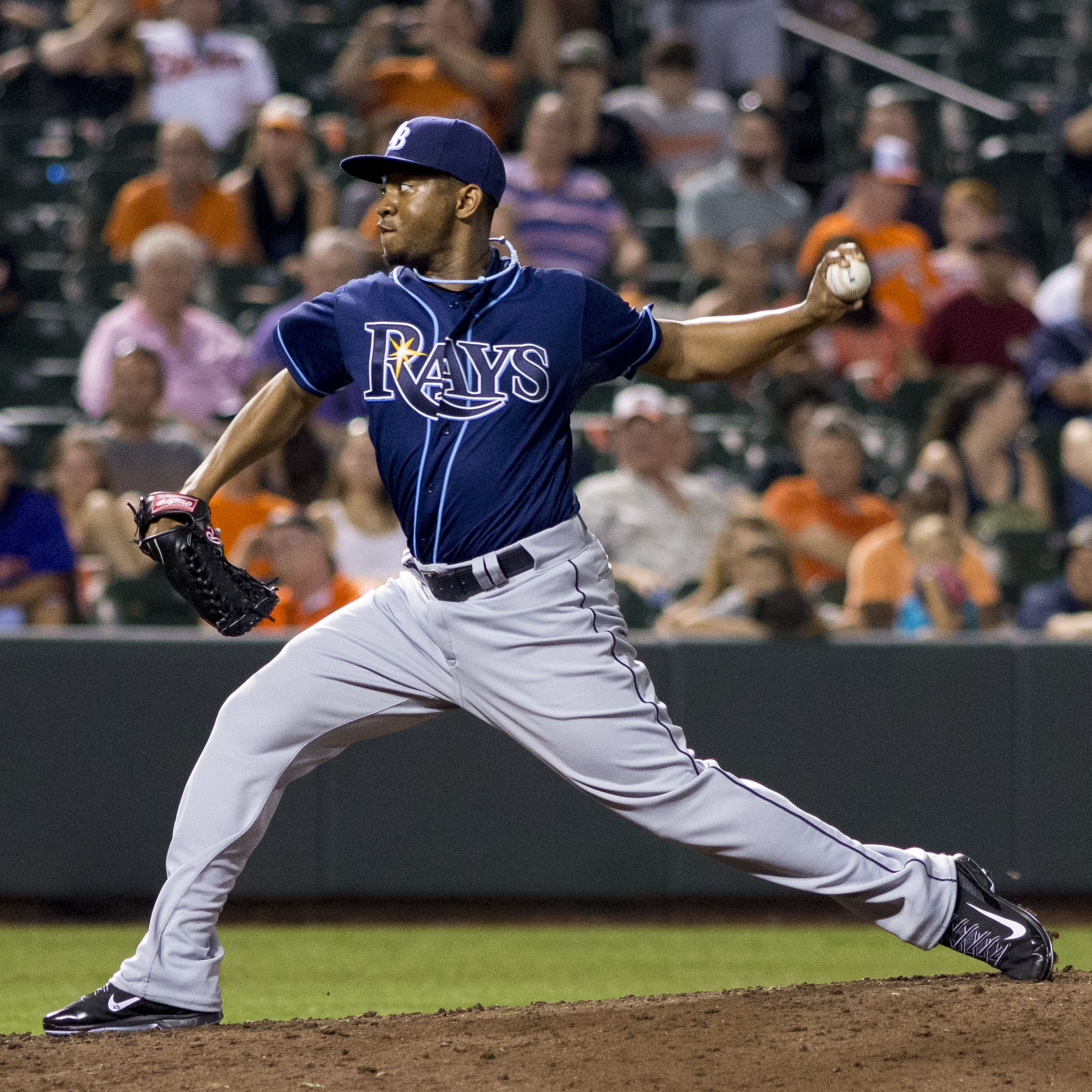
Wright with the Tampa Bay Rays in 2013

On August 12, 2013, Wright was traded to the Tampa Bay Rays in exchange for cash considerations. In 16 appearances for the Rays, he recorded a 2.92 ERA with 15 strikeouts across 12 1/3 innings pitched. With Tampa Bay, Wright made his playoff debut in 2013, appearing in two games of the Rays' ALDS matchup with the Boston Red Sox. On December 2, Wright was non-tendered by Tampa Bay, making him a free agent.

=== Chicago Cubs ===
On December 4, 2013, Wright agreed to a one-year, $1.425 million contract with the Chicago Cubs. The contract became official on December 16. Wright made 58 appearances for Chicago during the 2014 season, posting an 0-3 record and 3.17 ERA with 37 strikeouts across 48 1/3 innings pitched. He was non-tendered by the Cubs on December 2, 2014, and became a free agent.

=== Baltimore Orioles ===
On December 16, 2014, Wright agreed to a one–year, major league contract with the Baltimore Orioles. He made two appearances for the Orioles before he was placed on the injured list with a left trapezius strain on April 11, 2015. After struggling to a 7.71 ERA in 10 rehab outings for the Triple–A Norfolk Tides, Wright was designated for assignment on July 15. He was released by the Orioles organization on July 22.

=== Los Angeles Angels of Anaheim ===
On July 30, 2015, Wright signed a minor league contract with the Los Angeles Angels of Anaheim. In 12 appearances for the Triple–A Salt Lake Bees, he recorded a 1.42 ERA with 13 strikeouts across 12 2/3 innings pitched. On September 1, the Angels selected Wright's contract, adding him to their active roster. In 9 games for the Angels, he compiled a 3.18 ERA with 5 strikeouts over 5 2/3 innings of work.

=== Boston Red Sox ===
On December 22, 2015, Wright signed a minor league contract with the Arizona Diamondbacks organization. However, he was released prior to the start of the season on March 28, 2016. On April 12, Wright signed a minor league contract with the Boston Red Sox and was assigned to Triple–A Pawtucket Red Sox, where he appeared in 19 games before being released on July 11.

=== Texas Rangers ===
On January 27, 2017, Wright signed a minor league contract with the Texas Rangers. In 30 games out of the bullpen for the Triple–A Round Rock Express, he compiled a 4.88 ERA with 22 strikeouts over 31 1/3 innings pitched. Wright was released by the Rangers organization on July 23.

On November 11, 2017, it was announced Wright had decided to retire and take a job as a pro scout with the Minnesota Twins.
