= Charles Morton (editor) =

American journalist (1899–1967)

Charles Walton Morton Jr. (1899–1967) was a writer and journalist. Morton served as the associate editor of The Atlantic Monthly for 26 years (1941–1967). He also wrote several books about publishing, relationships, and other subjects. During his career, Morton achieved notoriety as one of the most noted humorists in the U.S.

== Early life and education ==
Morton was born in Omaha, Nebraska, on February 10, 1899. He graduated from Morristown School in Morristown, New Jersey (now Morristown-Beard School) in 1916. During his time at the school, Morton served as an editor of The Morristonian, the school newspaper. After high school, Morton attended Williams College in Williamstown, Massachusetts, for two years. He then worked in his father's hardware company. Morton also worked as a rancher at the Pitchfork Ranch near the Greybull River in northwestern Wyoming.

== Journalism and government service ==
Morton worked as a journalist in New York City and Boston, Massachusetts, between 1929 and 1936. He wrote newspaper articles for The Boston Herald and the Boston Evening Transcript. He also penned magazine articles for The New Yorker. In 1936, the Boston office of the U.S. Social Security Board (now the Social Security Administration) name Morton as their information director. He served in that role until 1941.

After joining The Atlantic, Morton founded the Accent on Living Department in 1943. The department published his monthly essays and articles on observations of American living. Morton later published collections of these essays in his books. In 1948, The Atlantic elected Morton to their board of directors. Robert Manning, editor-in-chief of the magazine, noted of Morton:

Charles Morton meant more to The Atlantic than his modest spot on the masthead could have made clear. He added to our editorial deliberations, and to our pages, a profound distaste for the bogus, the pedantic, and the self-interested argument. He forced us to look sharply at our world's congenital foolishness, he made us laugh, and he long ago made us realize that he won't be replaceable. He was one of a kind.

Morton lived on Ash Street in Cambridge, Massachusetts. During his career, Morton stayed well-connected to nearby Harvard University. He also grew a national network of connections with leaders at major newspapers. His local connections with Nieman Fellows at Harvard helped him to establish this network. During the 1940s, Morton worked with Francis Dahl, the Boston Herald's cartoonist, to produce two books. Dahl made the cartoons, and Morton wrote the text.

== Elongated yellow-fruit writing ==
Time magazine ran a 1953 story titled "The Press: Elongated Fruit", which examined Morton's use of the term "the elongated yellow-fruit school of writing". Morton coined the term to characterize writing styles that use inelegant variants for second reference of a word. The phrase "elongated, yellow fruit" relates to a second reference for bananas. In his book A Slight Sense of Outrage, Morton states that this type of faulty usage "lies somewhere between the cliché and the 'fine writing' so dreaded by teachers of English composition. ... It does bespeak an author who wishes to sound witty, knowledgeable, and versatile. ... It can also bespeak an author who is merely pompous."

Garner's Modern American Usage describes several examples of Morton's labeling of writing as "the elongated yellow-fruit school of writing":

- Elongated yellow fruit (banana)
- The numbered spheroids (billiard balls)
- The azure-whiskered wifeslayer (the fairy tale character Bluebeard)
- Hen-fruit safari (Easter egg hunt)
- Lacteal fluid (milk)
- Succulent bivalves (oysters)
- The succulent goober (peanut)
- Rubber-tired mastodon of the highway (truck)

== Family ==
Morton married Mildred Wadleigh Penick. They had two children, Patricia (deceased) and Cynthia.

== Works ==
- Dahl's Boston (1946)
- Dahl's Brave New World (1947)
- Frankly, George Or Letters to a Publisher From An Author Whose First Book Is About To Appear (1951)
- How To Protect Yourself Against Women – And Other Vicissitudes (1951)
- A Slight Sense of Outrage (1955)
- It Has Its Charms (1966)
