= Freshman Year (reality show) =

2009 documentary reality show

Freshman Year was a 23-episode documentary reality show web series shown on CNN.com in 2009 chronicling the first year in office of two legislators in Congress, Jared Polis (D-CO), an openly gay former internet entrepreneur, and Jason Chaffetz (R-UT), a Conservative Jewish Republican.

The politicians carried flip phones to capture their experiences in office. Richard Galant Sr. produced. Polis went on to serve five terms in the U.S. House and was Governor of Colorado. Chaffetz served in the House until 2017 when he announced he was leaving.
