= Wandy Rodríguez =

Dominican baseball player (born 1979)

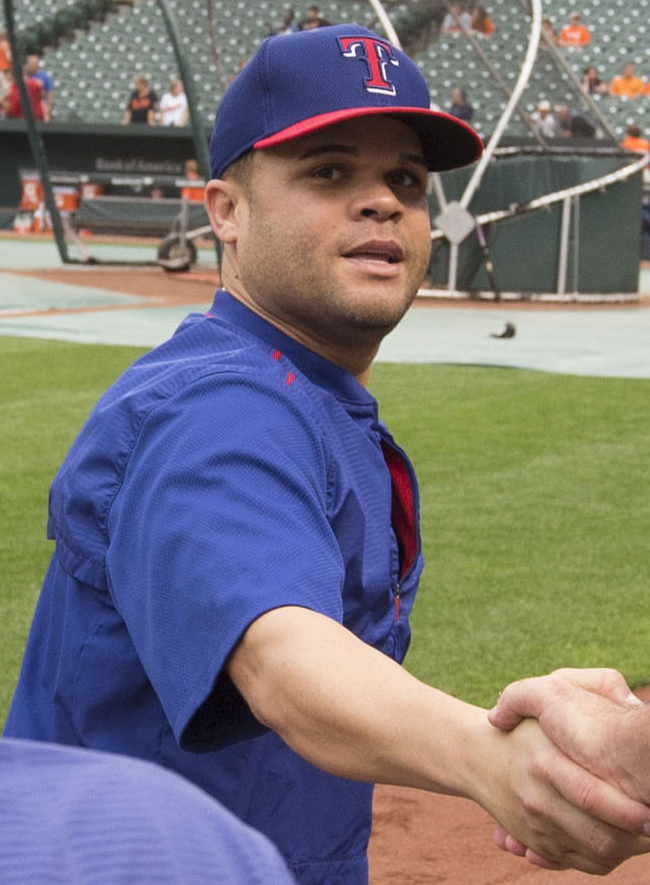
- Rodríguez with the Texas Rangers
- Pitcher
- Born: January 18, 1979 (age 47); Santiago Rodríguez, Dominican Republic
- Batted: Switch Threw: Left

MLB debut
- May 23, 2005, for the Houston Astros

Last MLB appearance
- July 28, 2015, for the Texas Rangers

Career statistics
- Win–loss record: 97–98
- Earned run average: 4.10
- Strikeouts: 1,281
- Stats at Baseball Reference

Teams
- Houston Astros (2005–2012); Pittsburgh Pirates (2012–2014); Texas Rangers (2015)
Medals
Men's baseball
Representing Dominican Republic
World Baseball Classic
Gold medal – first place	2013 San Francisco	Team

Wandy Fulton Rodríguez (born January 18, 1979) is a Dominican former professional baseball pitcher. He played in Major League Baseball (MLB) for the Houston Astros from 2005 to 2012, the Pittsburgh Pirates from 2012 to 2014 and the Texas Rangers in 2015.

== Early life ==
Rodríguez is a native of Santiago Rodríguez, in the North Region (Cibao Region) of the Dominican Republic.

== Major League career ==
=== Houston Astros ===
Rodríguez signed with the Houston Astros organization in January 1999. In 2001, he pitched for the Martinsville Astros. In 2002, he pitched for the Lexington Legends. In 2003, he pitched for the Salem Avalanche. In 2004, he pitched for the Round Rock Express. He made his major league debut May 23, 2005.

Rodríguez, who concluded with a 10–10 record in his 2005 rookie season, ended the season with a rocky September, going 1–4. Overall, he had a 5.53 ERA and struck out 80 batters throughout the season.

The Astros succeeded in getting to the 2005 World Series in which they were swept in four games by the Chicago White Sox. Rodríguez performed decently in the game 1 of the series, relieving Roger Clemens in the third inning with the score tied at 3. Rodriguez surrendered one more run in the bottom of the fourth inning, earning the loss as the White Sox went on to win, 5–3. Rodriguez posted a 2.45 ERA for the Series.

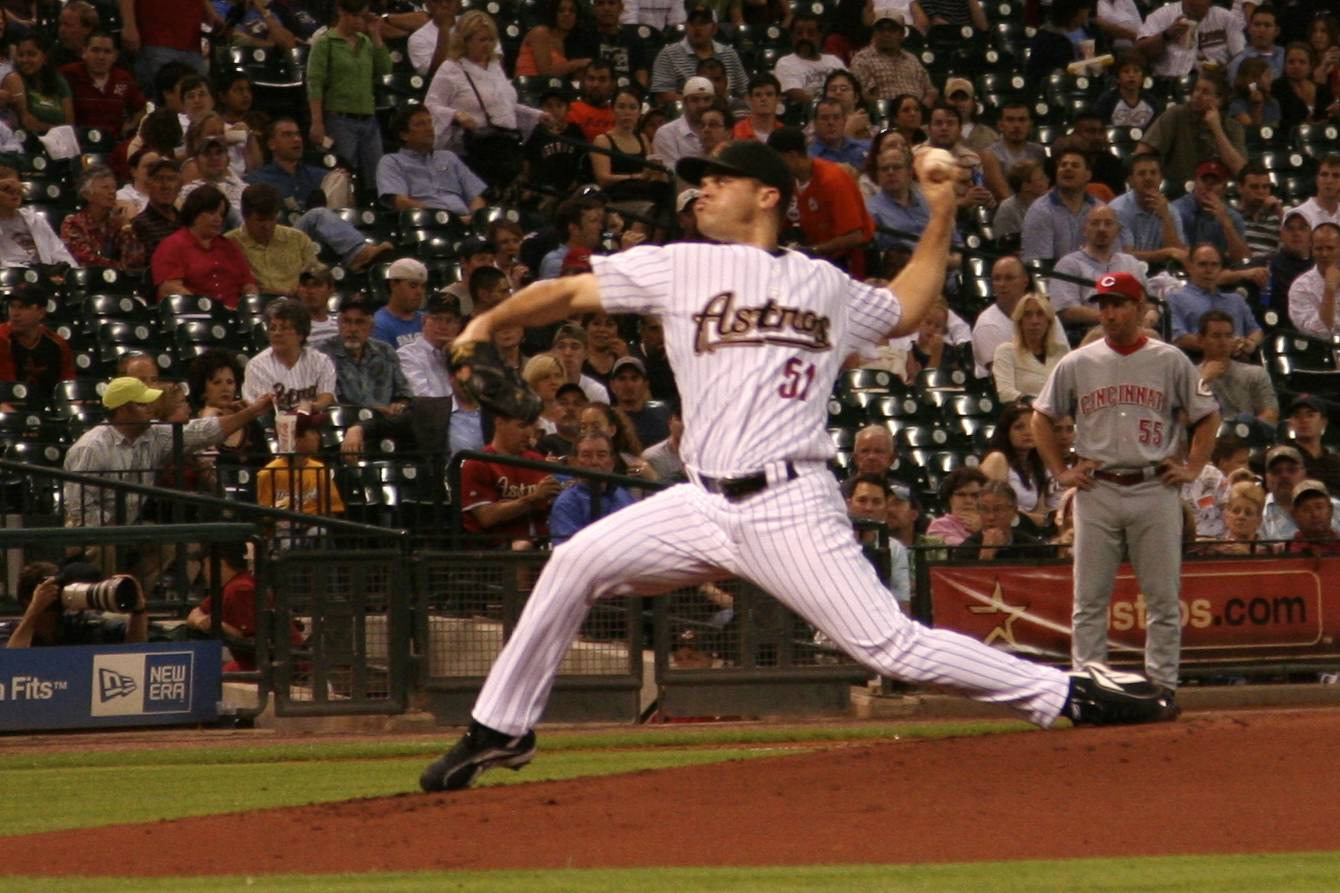
Rodriguez pitching for the Houston Astros

In 2006, after struggling to a 5.22 ERA, Rodríguez was optioned to the minors on July 21. Brandon Backe was activated from the 60-day disabled list to take his place on the major-league roster and the Astros rotation. However, Rodríguez was recalled on August 19 after Backe had to have Tommy John surgery. Rodriguez finished the season with a 9–10 record and a 5.64 ERA, along with 98 strikeouts in 135 innings.

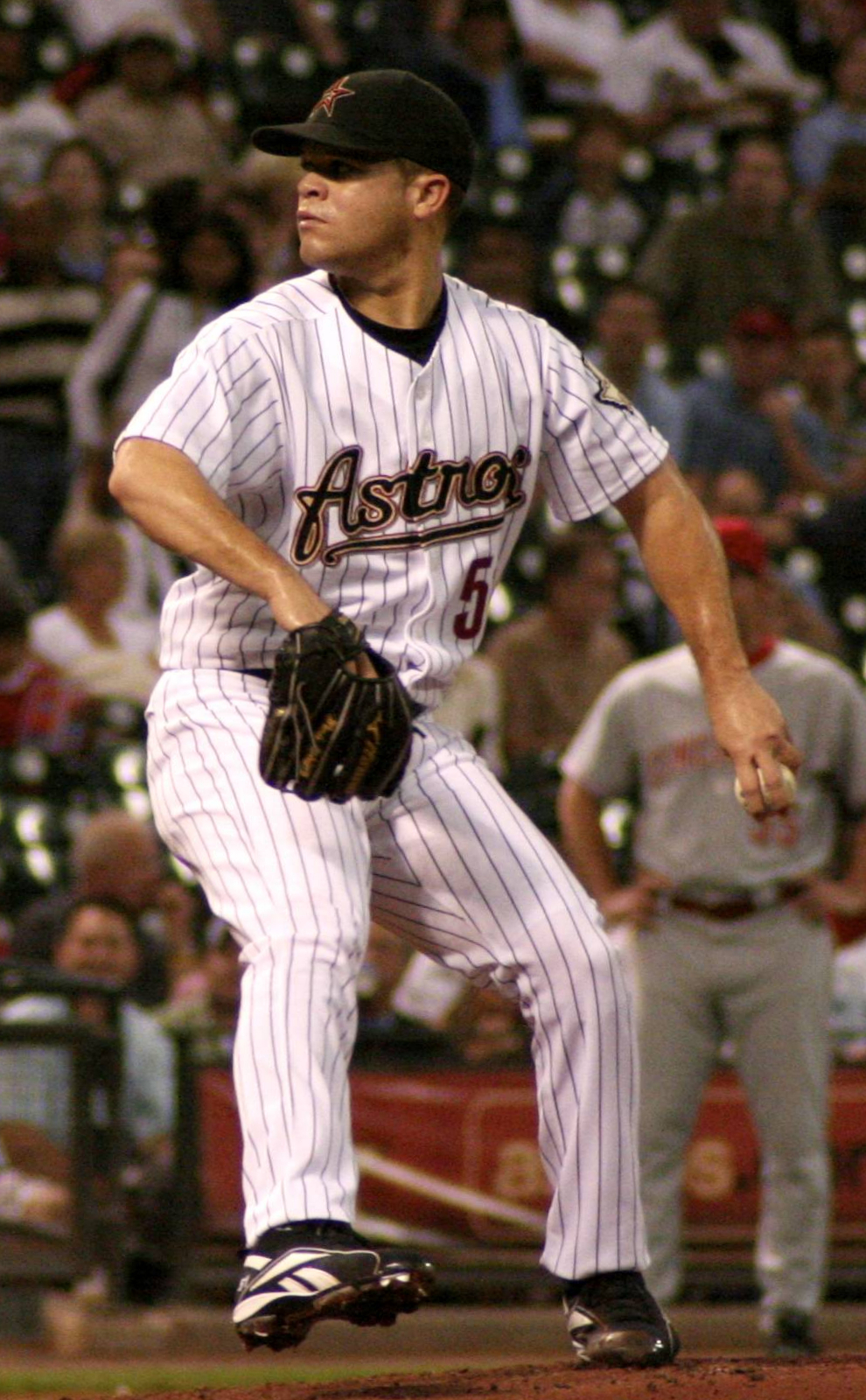
Rodríguez pitching for the Houston Astros in 2007

On July 6, 2007, Rodríguez earned his first complete-game shutout in a 4-hit performance against the New York Mets. Rodriguez had his first full healthy season in the majors, as he started and played in 31 games, finishing with a 4.58 ERA and a 9–13 record, along with 158 strikeouts in 182 innings. His BAA was a major improvement, going from .290 of the previous year to .254.

In 2008, Rodríguez struggled with injuries again, starting only 25 games and pitching only 137 innings. However, his performance was a big improvement statistically, finishing with a 3.54 ERA and a 9–7 record, along with 131 strikeouts and a perfect fielding percentage.

Rodríguez had a career year in 2009, after being moved up into the second spot in the Astros' rotation behind ace Roy Oswalt. He started in 33 games and pitched 205 innings while finishing with a 3.02 ERA, which ranked 9th in the NL. He struck out 193, ranking 8th and had his second complete game and shutout of his career.

Rodríguez regressed from his 2009 campaign in the first half of 2010, going 6–11 with a 4.97 ERA with only 77 strikeouts in 101 1/3 innings pitched prior to the All-Star break. He turned it around in the second half however, going 5–1 with a 2.11 ERA with 101 strikeouts in 93 2/3 innings, to finish with an 11–12 record with a 3.60 ERA and 178 strikeouts.

To begin the 2012 season, Rodríguez was the last Astro (player or coach) remaining from the 2005 squad that went to the World Series. (However, one player, Chad Qualls, re-joined the Astros in 2014 and 2015). On January 26, 2011, he and the Astros agreed to a new three-year contract for $34 million. He finished the 2011 season with an 11–11 record and a 3.49 ERA over 191 innings.

=== Pittsburgh Pirates ===
On July 24, 2012, the Pittsburgh Pirates traded Rudy Owens, Robbie Grossman and Colton Cain to the Houston Astros for Rodríguez and cash. Rodriguez's Pirates debut came in Houston, on July 28, 2012, against his former team, the Astros, where he recorded a no-decision.

With Houston, in a deep rebuild, having agreed to pick up part of Rodríguez's 2013 salary, it was reported that Rodríguez was Houston's highest-paid player in 2013 despite having been traded to Pittsburgh.

On May 22, 2014, the Pirates designated Rodriguez for assignment. On May 30, 2014, Rodríguez was released by the Pirates.

=== Texas Rangers ===
On December 27, 2014, he agreed to a minor league contract with the Philadelphia Phillies. However, he failed his physical examination performed by Phillies' doctors, and subsequently signed a minor league contract with the Atlanta Braves. He was released on April 3.

On April 6, 2015 Rodríguez signed a minor league contract with the Texas Rangers. On May 10, in a game against the Tampa Bay Rays, Rodriguez retired 15 straight batters to start the game. Adding on to his previous outing of 19 straight outs in his May 5 start in Houston, he set the Rangers franchise record for most consecutive batters retired with 34 straight. After a string of bad starts, Rodriguez was designated for assignment on July 29, and became a free agent on August 4.

=== Kansas City Royals ===
On August 16, 2015, Rodriguez signed a minor league contract with the Kansas City Royals. He was released on November 20.

=== Houston Astros (second stint) ===
On January 26, 2016, Rodriguez signed a minor league deal to return to the Astros. He was released on April 5.

=== Baltimore Orioles ===
On April 29, 2016, Rodriguez signed a minor league deal with the Baltimore Orioles. On June 9, 2016, Rodriguez opted out of his minor league deal from the Orioles, becoming a free agent.

== Identity issues ==
When he was scouted by the Astros in 1998, Rodriguez falsely stated his name was Eny Cabreja and that he was only 17 years old. He had convinced a friend to let him borrow his identity. The real Cabreja was born on August 18, 1981, while Wandy was born on January 18, 1979. Wandy lived under the name Eny Cabreja until 2002, when he admitted to the Astros that he was in fact Wandy Fulton Rodriguez and that he was not really 21 years of age but 23.

== See also ==
- Houston Astros award winners and league leaders
- List of Major League Baseball players from the Dominican Republic

Awards and achievements
Preceded by Tim Lincecum	National League Pitcher of the Month; July 2009	Succeeded by Chris Carpenter
