= Alberto Árias =

Dominican baseball player (born 1983)

Alberto Arias
- Pitcher
- Born: October 14, 1983 (age 42); Santo Domingo, Dominican Republic
- Batted: Right Threw: Right

MLB debut
- May 1, 2007, for the Colorado Rockies

Last MLB appearance
- August 23, 2009, for the Houston Astros

MLB statistics
- Win–loss record: 4–2
- Earned run average: 3.74
- Strikeouts: 55
- Stats at Baseball Reference

Teams
- Colorado Rockies (2007–2008); Houston Astros (2008–2009)

Alberto A. Arias (born October 14, 1983) is a Dominican former professional baseball pitcher.

In 2006, Arias played in Minor League Baseball with the Tulsa Drillers. Arias made his MLB debut with the Colorado Rockies in 2007 and made 6 relief appearances, going 1–0 with a 4.91 ERA. On July 31, 2008, the Houston Astros claimed him off waivers from the Rockies and assigned him to Triple-A Round Rock.

In 2009, Arias took a big step forward in his career, setting career-best marks in games played (42), innings pitched (45.2), WHIP (1.489) and ERA (3.35).

Arias missed the 2010 and 2011 seasons due to injury. On October 24, 2011, he re-signed a minor league contract with the Astros.
