= 2007 Arizona Diamondbacks season =

2007 Arizona Diamondbacks
- National League West Division champion
- League: National League
- Division: West
- Ballpark: Chase Field
- City: Phoenix, Arizona
- Record: 90–72 (.556)
- Divisional place: 1st
- Owners: Ken Kendrick; Jeff Moorad
- General managers: Josh Byrnes
- Managers: Bob Melvin
- Television: FSN Arizona; KTVK (3TV) (Daron Sutton, Mark Grace, Greg Schulte, Joe Garagiola, Matt Williams)
- Radio: KTAR (620 AM) (Greg Schulte, Jeff Munn, Tom Candiotti); KSUN (Spanish)

The 2007 Arizona Diamondbacks season was the franchise's 10th season in Major League Baseball and their 10th season at Chase Field in Phoenix, Maricopa County Arizona, as Member of the National League West Division.

The season started with the Diamondbacks attempting to win the National League West. The Arizona Diamondbacks' biggest move in the offseason was when, on January 9, 2007, they got their 2001 World Series co-MVP back, pitcher Randy Johnson after making a blockbuster deal with the New York Yankees, sending to New York relief pitcher Luis Vizcaíno and three other prospects. However, Johnson suffered from injuries and underwent season-ending surgery in early August. Despite Johnson's absence and the fact they had fewer runs scored (712) than runs allowed (732), the Diamondbacks had the best record in the National League (90-72), notching their first National League West title since 2002 and their first winning record since 2003.

== Regular season ==
=== League standings ===
==== National League West ====
NL West
| Team | W | L | Pct. | GB | Home | Road |
|---|---|---|---|---|---|---|
| Arizona Diamondbacks | 90 | 72 | .556 | — | 50‍–‍31 | 40‍–‍41 |
| Colorado Rockies | 90 | 73 | .552 | ½ | 51‍–‍31 | 39‍–‍42 |
| San Diego Padres | 89 | 74 | .546 | 1½ | 47‍–‍34 | 42‍–‍40 |
| Los Angeles Dodgers | 82 | 80 | .506 | 8 | 43‍–‍38 | 39‍–‍42 |
| San Francisco Giants | 71 | 91 | .438 | 19 | 39‍–‍42 | 32‍–‍49 |

==== Record vs. opponents ====
2007 National League record Source: MLB Standings Grid – 2007
| Team | AZ | ATL | CHC | CIN | COL | FLA | HOU | LAD | MIL | NYM | PHI | PIT | SD | SF | STL | WAS | AL |
|---|---|---|---|---|---|---|---|---|---|---|---|---|---|---|---|---|---|
| Arizona | — | 4–2 | 4–2 | 2–4 | 8–10 | 6–1 | 5–2 | 8–10 | 2–5 | 3–4 | 5–1 | 5–4 | 10–8 | 10–8 | 4–3 | 6–1 | 8–7 |
| Atlanta | 2–4 | — | 5–4 | 1–6 | 4–2 | 10–8 | 3–3 | 4–3 | 5–2 | 9–9 | 9–9 | 5–1 | 5–2 | 4–3 | 3–4 | 11–7 | 4–11 |
| Chicago | 2–4 | 4–5 | — | 9–9 | 5–2 | 0–6 | 8–7 | 2–5 | 9–6 | 2–5 | 3–4 | 8–7 | 3–5 | 5–2 | 11–5 | 6–1 | 8–4 |
| Cincinnati | 4–2 | 6–1 | 9–9 | — | 2–4 | 4–3 | 4–11 | 2–4 | 8–7 | 2–5 | 2–4 | 9–7 | 2–4 | 4–3 | 6–9 | 1–6 | 7-11 |
| Colorado | 10–8 | 2–4 | 2–5 | 4–2 | — | 3–3 | 3–4 | 12–6 | 4–2 | 4–2 | 4–3 | 4–3 | 11–8 | 10–8 | 3–4 | 4–3 | 10–8 |
| Florida | 1–6 | 8–10 | 6–0 | 3–4 | 3–3 | — | 2–3 | 4–3 | 2–5 | 7–11 | 9–9 | 3–4 | 3–4 | 1–6 | 2–4 | 8–10 | 9–9 |
| Houston | 2–5 | 3–3 | 7–8 | 11–4 | 4–3 | 3-2 | — | 4–3 | 5–13 | 2–5 | 3–3 | 5–10 | 4–3 | 2–4 | 7–9 | 2–5 | 9–9 |
| Los Angeles | 10–8 | 3–4 | 5–2 | 4–2 | 6–12 | 3–4 | 3–4 | — | 3–3 | 5–5 | 4–2 | 5–2 | 8–10 | 10–8 | 3–3 | 5–1 | 5–10 |
| Milwaukee | 5–2 | 2–5 | 6–9 | 7–8 | 2–4 | 5–2 | 13–5 | 3–3 | — | 2–4 | 3–4 | 10–6 | 2–5 | 4–5 | 7–8 | 4–2 | 8–7 |
| New York | 4–3 | 9–9 | 5–2 | 5–2 | 2–4 | 11–7 | 5–2 | 5–5 | 4–2 | — | 6–12 | 4–2 | 2–4 | 4–2 | 5–2 | 9–9 | 8–7 |
| Philadelphia | 1-5 | 9–9 | 4–3 | 4–2 | 3–4 | 9–9 | 3–3 | 2–4 | 4–3 | 12–6 | — | 4–2 | 4–3 | 4–4 | 6–3 | 12–6 | 8–7 |
| Pittsburgh | 4–5 | 1–5 | 7–8 | 7–9 | 3–4 | 4–3 | 10–5 | 2–5 | 6–10 | 2–4 | 2–4 | — | 1–6 | 4–2 | 6–12 | 4–2 | 5–10 |
| San Diego | 8–10 | 2–5 | 5–3 | 4–2 | 8–11 | 4–3 | 3–4 | 10–8 | 5–2 | 4–2 | 3–4 | 6–1 | — | 14–4 | 3–4 | 4–2 | 6–9 |
| San Francisco | 8–10 | 3–4 | 2–5 | 3–4 | 8–10 | 6–1 | 4–2 | 8–10 | 5–4 | 2–4 | 4–4 | 2–4 | 4–14 | — | 4–1 | 3–4 | 5–10 |
| St. Louis | 3–4 | 4–3 | 5–11 | 9–6 | 4–3 | 4-2 | 9–7 | 3–3 | 8–7 | 2–5 | 3–6 | 12–6 | 4–3 | 1–4 | — | 1–5 | 6–9 |
| Washington | 1–6 | 7–11 | 1–6 | 6–1 | 3–4 | 10-8 | 5–2 | 1–5 | 2–4 | 9–9 | 6–12 | 2–4 | 2–4 | 4–3 | 5–1 | — | 9–9 |

=== Roster ===
2007 Arizona Diamondbacks
Roster
| Pitchers: 32 Randy Choate; 37 Juan Cruz; 49 Doug Davis; 32 J. D. Durbin; 39 Dana Eveland; 31 Édgar González; 48 Enrique González; 61 Liván Hernández; 51 Randy Johnson; 40 Joe Kennedy; 32 Byung-hyun Kim; 38 Brandon Lyon; 28 Brandon Medders; 40 Bill Murphy; 57 Dustin Nippert; 44 Micah Owings; 35 Jailen Peguero; 56 Tony Peña; 50 Yusmeiro Petit; 62 Mike Schultz; 45 Doug Slaten; 47 José Valverde; 17 Brandon Webb; 32 Bob Wickman | Catchers: 5 Robby Hammock; 26 Miguel Montero; 19 Chris Snyder; Infielders: 14 Brian Barden; 4 Emilio Bonifacio; 13 Alberto Callaspo; 9 Jeff Cirillo; 34 Tony Clark; 6 Stephen Drew; 1 Orlando Hudson; 16 Conor Jackson; 11 Augie Ojeda; 27 Mark Reynolds; 4 Donnie Sadler; 21 Jason Smith; 18 Chad Tracy | Outfielders: 22 Eric Byrnes; 30 Jeff DaVanon; 9 Scott Hairston; 7 Carlos Quentin; 15 Jeff Salazar; 10 Justin Upton; 24 Chris Young | Manager: 3 Bob Melvin; Coaches: 23 Kirk Gibson (bench); 12 Chip Hale (third base); 35 Bryan Price (pitching); 2 Kevin Seitzer (hitting); 53 Glenn Sherlock (bullpen); 8 Lee Tinsley (first base) |

=== Game log ===
2007 game log (90-72)
April (16-11)

| # | Date | Opponent | Score | Win | Loss | Save | Attendance | Record |
|---|---|---|---|---|---|---|---|---|
| 1 | April 2 | @ Rockies | 8 - 6 | Cruz (1-0) | Hawkins (0-1) | Valverde (1) | 48,169 | 1-0 |
| 2 | April 3 | @ Rockies | 4 - 3 (11) | Kim (1-0) | Valverde (0-1) | | 20,547 | 1-1 |
| 3 | April 4 | @ Rockies | 11 - 4 | López (1-0) | Davis (0-1) | | 19,352 | 1-2 |
| 4 | April 5 | @ Nationals | 4 - 3 | González (1-0) | Bergmann (0-1) | Valverde (2) | 16,017 | 2-2 |
| 5 | April 6 | @ Nationals | 7 - 1 | Owings (1-0) | Williams (0-1) | | 19,234 | 3-2 |
| 6 | April 7 | @ Nationals | 7 - 1 | Webb (1-0) | Patterson (0-2) | | 16,617 | 4-2 |
| 7 | April 8 | @ Nationals | 3 - 1 | Hernández (1-0) | Hill (0-2) | Valverde (3) | 17,244 | 5-2 |
| 8 | April 9 | Reds | 3 - 2 | Lyon (1-0) | Saarloos (0-1) | Valverde (4) | 41,803 | 6-2 |
| 9 | April 10 | Reds | 5 - 4 (11) | Cruz (2-0) | Weathers (0-1) | | 21,225 | 7-2 |
| 10 | April 11 | Reds | 3 - 2 | Belisle (2-0) | Owings (1-1) | Weathers (3) | 19,534 | 7-3 |
| 11 | April 13 | Rockies | 6 - 3 | Affeldt (1-0) | Webb (1-1) | Fuentes (2) | 20,219 | 7-4 |
| 12 | April 14 | Rockies | 5 - 4 | Lyon (2-0) | Hawkins (0-3) | Valverde (5) | 27,721 | 8-4 |
| 13 | April 15 | Rockies | 6 - 4 | Davis (1-1) | Kim (1-2) | Valverde (6) | 21,904 | 9-4 |
| 14 | April 16 | Dodgers | 5 - 1 | Penny (3-0) | González (1-1) | | 27,427 | 9-5 |
| 15 | April 17 | Dodgers | 6 - 4 | Billingsley (1-0) | Peña (0-1) | Saito (6) | 25,735 | 9-6 |
| 16 | April 18 | @ Padres | 5 - 2 (12) | Peña (1-1) | Thompson (0-1) | Valverde (7) | 26,872 | 10-6 |
| 17 | April 19 | @ Padres | 11 - 6 | Peavy (3-0) | Hernández (1-1) | | 32,224 | 10-7 |
| 18 | April 20 | @ Giants | 4 - 2 | Ortiz (2-1) | Davis (1-2) | Benítez (3) | 39,010 | 10-8 |
| 19 | April 21 | @ Giants | 1 - 0 | Zito (2-2) | González (1-2) | Benítez (4) | 36,281 | 10-9 |
| 20 | April 22 | @ Giants | 2 - 1 | Cain (1-1) | Petit (0-1) | | 36,868 | 10-10 |
| 21 | April 24 | Padres | 10 - 5 | Wells (1-1) | Johnson (0-1) | Hoffman (4) | 19,508 | 10-11 |
| 22 | April 25 | Padres | 3 - 2 | Peña (2-1) | Hoffman (1-1) | | 18,307 | 11-11 |
| 23 | April 26 | Padres | 7 - 4 | Hernández (2-1) | Young (2-2) | Valverde (8) | 16,792 | 12-11 |
| 24 | April 27 | Giants | 3 - 2 | Davis (2-2) | Zito (2-3) | Valverde (9) | 24,798 | 13-11 |
| 25 | April 28 | Giants | 5 - 4 | Nippert (1-0) | Chulk (0-1) | Valverde (10) | 32,147 | 14-11 |
| 26 | April 29 | Giants | 5 - 4 | Medders (1-0) | Morris (3-1) | Lyon (1) | 28,818 | 15-11 |
| 27 | April 30 | @ Dodgers | 9 - 1 | Webb (2-1) | Wolf (3-3) | | 53,126 | 16-11 |

May (16-12)

| # | Date | Opponent | Score | Win | Loss | Save | Attendance | Record |
|---|---|---|---|---|---|---|---|---|
| 28 | May 1 | @ Dodgers | 2 - 1 | Saito (1-0) | Lyon (2-1) | | 36,029 | 16-12 |
| 29 | May 2 | @ Dodgers | 2 - 1 | Hendrickson (2-0) | Davis (2-3) | Saito (8) | 34,825 | 16-13 |
| 30 | May 3 | Mets | 9 - 4 | Heilman (2-2) | Valverde (0-2) | | 19,710 | 16-14 |
| 31 | May 4 | Mets | 5 - 3 | Maine (5-0) | Johnson (0-2) | Wagner (6) | 26,268 | 16-15 |
| 32 | May 5 | Mets | 6 - 2 | Sosa (1-0) | Webb (2-2) | | 30,339 | 16-16 |
| 33 | May 6 | Mets | 3 - 1 | Hernández (3-1) | Pelfrey (0-4) | Valverde (11) | 35,363 | 17-16 |
| 34 | May 7 | Phillies | 4 - 3 | Lyon (3-1) | Rosario (0-2) | Valverde (12) | 19,592 | 18-16 |
| 35 | May 8 | Phillies | 3 - 2 | Owings (2-1) | Eaton (3-3) | Peña (1) | 22,888 | 19-16 |
| 36 | May 9 | Phillies | 9 - 3 | Moyer (4-2) | Medders (1-1) | Myers (3) | 25,286 | 19-17 |
| 37 | May 11 | @ Astros | 3 - 1 | Webb (3-2) | Sampson (3-3) | | 36,080 | 20-17 |
| 38 | May 12 | @ Astros | 10 - 4 | Oswalt (6-2) | Hernández (3-2) | | 36,142 | 20-18 |
| 39 | May 13 | @ Astros | 5 - 2 | Rodríguez (1-3) | Davis (2-4) | | 37,230 | 20-19 |
| 40 | May 15 | @ Rockies | 3 - 0 | Johnson (1-2) | Hirsh (2-4) | Valverde (13) | 20,178 | 21-19 |
| 41 | May 16 | @ Rockies | 5 - 3 | Cook (3-1) | Webb (3-3) | Fuentes (10) | 20,023 | 21-20 |
| 42 | May 17 | @ Rockies | 3 - 1 | Hernández (4-2) | Fogg (1-5) | Valverde (14) | 23,610 | 22-20 |
| 43 | May 18 | @ Pirates | 11 - 5 | Snell (4-2) | Davis (2-5) | | 32,682 | 22-21 |
| 44 | May 19 | @ Pirates | 9 - 8 | Slaten (1-0) | Capps (2-2) | Valverde (15) | 30,677 | 23-21 |
| 45 | May 20 | @ Pirates | 5 - 2 | Johnson (2-2) | Maholm (2-6) | Valverde (16) | 24,282 | 24-21 |
| 46 | May 21 | Rockies | 6 - 5 | Slaten (2-0) | Affeldt (1-1) | Valverde (17) | 19,782 | 25-21 |
| 47 | May 22 | Rockies | 3 - 1 | Corpas (1-2) | Lyon (3-2) | Fuentes (11) | 23,058 | 25-22 |
| 48 | May 23 | Rockies | 2 - 0 | Francis (3-4) | Davis (2-6) | Fuentes (13) | 18,373 | 25-23 |
| 49 | May 24 | Astros | 9 - 1 | Owings (3-1) | Rodríguez (2-4) | | 18,130 | 26-23 |
| 50 | May 25 | Astros | 13 - 3 | González (2-2) | Williams (1-7) | | 23,298 | 27-23 |
| 51 | May 26 | Astros | 5 - 4 | Webb (4-3) | Sampson (4-5) | Valverde (18) | 27,836 | 28-23 |
| 52 | May 27 | Astros | 8 - 4 | Hernández (5-2) | Oswalt (6-4) | | 26,621 | 29-23 |
| 53 | May 28 | @ Phillies | 5 - 4 | Davis (3-6) | García (1-4) | Lyon (2) | 41,985 | 30-23 |
| 54 | May 29 | @ Phillies | 11 - 5 | Owings (4-1) | Lieber (2-3) | | 27,643 | 31-23 |
| 55 | May 30 | @ Phillies | 4 - 3 | Johnson (3-2) | Moyer (5-4) | Valverde (19) | 33,281 | 32-23 |

June (14-13)

| # | Date | Opponent | Score | Win | Loss | Save | Attendance | Record |
|---|---|---|---|---|---|---|---|---|
| 56 | June 1 | @ Mets | 5 - 1 | Webb (5-3) | Maine (6-3) | | 40,230 | 33-23 |
| 57 | June 2 | @ Mets | 7 - 1 | Sosa (5-1) | Hernández (5-3) | | 45,219 | 33-24 |
| 58 | June 3 | @ Mets | 4 - 1 | Davis (4-6) | Pérez (6-4) | Valverde (20) | 53,012 | 34-24 |
| 59 | June 5 | Giants | 4 - 3 (10) | Lyon (4-2) | Correia (1-3) | | 25,848 | 35-24 |
| 60 | June 6 | Giants | 1 - 0 | Webb (6-3) | Morris (6-3) | Valverde (21) | 24,398 | 36-24 |
| 61 | June 7 | Giants | 5 - 4 (11) | Taschner (1-0) | Medders (1-2) | Kline (1) | 21,984 | 36-25 |
| 62 | June 8 | Red Sox | 10 - 3 | Beckett (9-0) | Davis (4-7) | | 40,435 | 36-26 |
| 63 | June 9 | Red Sox | 4 - 3 (10) | Okajima (2-0) | Cruz (2-1) | Papelbon (14) | 49,826 | 36-27 |
| 64 | June 10 | Red Sox | 5 - 1 | Johnson (4-2) | Matsuzaka (7-5) | | 46,622 | 37-27 |
| 65 | June 12 | @ Yankees | 4 - 1 | Wang (6-4) | Webb (6-4) | Rivera (8) | 51,577 | 37-28 |
| 66 | June 13 | @ Yankees | 7 - 2 | Mussina (3-3) | Hernández (5-4) | | 53,891 | 37-29 |
| 67 | June 14 | @ Yankees | 7 - 1 | Pettitte (4-4) | Davis (4-8) | | 53,712 | 37-30 |
| 68 | June 15 | @ Orioles | 7 - 3 | Slaten (3-0) | Williams (0-2) | | 26,174 | 38-30 |
| 69 | June 16 | @ Orioles | 8 - 4 | González (3-2) | Cabrera (5-8) | | 26,964 | 39-30 |
| 70 | June 17 | @ Orioles | 6 - 4 | Webb (7-4) | Bradford (0-4) | Valverde (22) | 27,934 | 40-30 |
| 71 | June 18 | Devil Rays | 10 - 2 | Hammel (1-0) | Hernández (5-5) | | 18,963 | 40-31 |
| 72 | June 19 | Devil Rays | 10 - 8 (10) | Lyon (5-2) | Reyes (1-1) | | 19,761 | 41-31 |
| 73 | June 20 | Devil Rays | 7 - 4 | Owings (5-1) | Shields (6-2) | Valverde (23) | 31,805 | 42-31 |
| 74 | June 22 | Orioles | 7 - 1 | Cabrera (6-8) | Webb (7-5) | | 21,722 | 42-32 |
| 75 | June 23 | Orioles | 7 - 4 | Cruz (3-1) | Bell (0-1) | Valverde (24) | 29,832 | 43-32 |
| 76 | June 24 | Orioles | 8 - 3 | Davis (5-8) | Trachsel (5-6) | | 27,744 | 44-32 |
| 77 | June 25 | Dodgers | 8 - 1 | Penny (10-1) | Owings (5-2) | | 24,966 | 44-33 |
| 78 | June 26 | Dodgers | 6 - 5 (10) | Broxton (3-2) | Slaten (3-1) | Saito (21) | 28,734 | 44-34 |
| 79 | June 27 | Dodgers | 2 - 0 | Webb (8-4) | Lowe (8-7) | Valverde (25) | 26,867 | 45-34 |
| 80 | June 28 | Dodgers | 9 - 5 | Wolf (9-6) | Johnson (4-3) | Saito (22) | 26,526 | 45-35 |
| 81 | June 29 | @ Giants | 4 - 3 (10) | Peña (3-1) | Hennessey (1-3) | Valverde (26) | 39,146 | 46-35 |
| 82 | June 30 | @ Giants | 4 - 1 | Lowry (8-6) | Davis (5-9) | Hennessey (4) | 41,515 | 46-36 |

July (13-13)

| # | Date | Opponent | Score | Win | Loss | Save | Attendance | Record |
|---|---|---|---|---|---|---|---|---|
| 83 | July 1 | @ Giants | 13 - 0 | Lincecum (3-2) | Owings (5-3) | | 42,154 | 46-37 |
| 84 | July 2 | @ Cardinals | 11 - 3 | Springer (4-1) | Webb (8-6) | | 42,312 | 46-38 |
| 85 | July 3 | @ Cardinals | 7 - 1 | Petit (1-1) | Wellemeyer (2-2) | | 42,127 | 47-38 |
| 86 | July 4 | @ Cardinals | 5 - 4 | Franklin (3-0) | Lyon (5-3) | Isringhausen (16) | 43,538 | 47-39 |
| 87 | July 5 | @ Cardinals | 3 - 2 | Wainwright (7-7) | Davis (5-10) | Isringhausen (17) | 42,184 | 47-40 |
| 88 | July 6 | @ Reds | 8 - 1 | Lohse (5-10) | Owings (5-4) | | 20,445 | 47-41 |
| 89 | July 7 | @ Reds | 5 - 4 | Coutlangus (4-1) | Peña (3-2) | Weathers (17) | 34,410 | 47-42 |
| 90 | July 8 | @ Reds | 4 - 3 (11) | Saarloos (1-4) | Valverde (0-3) | | 28,169 | 47-43 |
| 91 | July 13 | Padres | 8 - 3 | Davis (6-10) | Maddux (7-7) | | 30,981 | 48-43 |
| 92 | July 14 | Padres | 5 - 4 | Lyon (6-3) | Linebrink (2-2) | Valverde (27) | 36,833 | 49-43 |
| 93 | July 15 | Padres | 4 - 0 | Germano (6-3) | Webb (8-7) | | 30,343 | 49-44 |
| 94 | July 16 | @ Brewers | 4 - 3 | Bush (8-7) | Owings (5-5) | Cordero (29) | 36,381 | 49-45 |
| 95 | July 17 | @ Brewers | 3 - 2 | Vargas (7-2) | Petit (1-2) | Cordero (30) | 32,540 | 49-46 |
| 96 | July 18 | @ Brewers | 5 - 2 | Peña (4-2) | Balfour (0-1) | Valverde (28) | 30,247 | 50-46 |
| 97 | July 19 | @ Brewers | 10 - 1 | Gallardo (2-1) | Hernández (5-6) | Wise (1) | 41,156 | 50-47 |
| 98 | July 20 | @ Cubs | 6 - 2 | Marquis (7-5) | Webb (8-8) | | 41,071 | 50-48 |
| 99 | July 21 | @ Cubs | 3 - 2 | Cruz (4-1) | Howry (5-5) | Valverde (29) | 41,632 | 51-48 |
| 100 | July 22 | @ Cubs | 3 - 0 | Petit (2-2) | Marshall (4-4) | Valverde (30) | 41,705 | 52-48 |
| 101 | July 23 | Marlins | 4 - 3 | Davis (7-10) | Willis (7-10) | Valverde (31) | 19,620 | 53-48 |
| 102 | July 24 | Marlins | 9 - 3 | Hernández (6-6) | Mitre (4-5) | | 21,035 | 54-48 |
| 103 | July 25 | Marlins | 7 - 0 | Webb (9-8) | Olsen (8-8) | | 20,154 | 55-48 |
| 104 | July 26 | Marlins | 7 - 4 | Peña (5-2) | Benítez (2-6) | | 18,721 | 56-48 |
| 105 | July 27 | Braves | 8 - 7 (11) | González (4-2) | Ledezma (0-2) | | 27,151 | 57-48 |
| 106 | July 28 | Braves | 4 - 3 (10) | Cruz (5-1) | Yates (2-3) | | 33,664 | 58-48 |
| 107 | July 29 | Braves | 14 - 0 | Hudson (11-5) | Hernández (6-7) | | 30,535 | 58-49 |
| 108 | July 31 | @ Padres | 4 - 0 | Webb (10-8) | Germano (6-6) | | 32,086 | 59-49 |

August (16-12)

| # | Date | Opponent | Score | Win | Loss | Save | Attendance | Record |
|---|---|---|---|---|---|---|---|---|
| 109 | August 1 | @ Padres | 9 - 5 (11) | Valverde (1-3) | Bell (4-3) | | 30,416 | 60-49 |
| 110 | August 2 | @ Padres | 11 - 0 | Peavy (11-5) | Petit (2-3) | | 37,119 | 60-50 |
| 111 | August 3 | @ Dodgers | 1 - 0 | Davis (8-10) | Billingsley (7-2) | Valverde (32) | 51,582 | 61-50 |
| 112 | August 4 | @ Dodgers | 8 - 7 | Hernández (7-7) | Lowe (8-10) | Valverde (33) | 52,921 | 62-50 |
| 113 | August 5 | @ Dodgers | 3 - 0 | Webb (11-8) | Penny (13-3) | | 48,803 | 63-50 |
| 114 | August 7 | Pirates | 8 - 3 | Gorzelanny (10-6) | Owings (5-6) | | 25,340 | 63-51 |
| 115 | August 8 | Pirates | 10 - 6 | González (5-2) | Maholm (7-14) | Valverde (34) | 23,082 | 64-51 |
| 116 | August 9 | Pirates | 4 - 2 | Davis (9-10) | Chacón (4-3) | Valverde (35) | 22,316 | 65-51 |
| 117 | August 10 | Nationals | 11 - 4 | Hernández (8-7) | Rivera (4-4) | | 31,110 | 66-51 |
| 118 | August 11 | Nationals | 1 - 0 | Webb (12-8) | Lannan (1-1) | | 32,121 | 67-51 |
| 119 | August 12 | Nationals | 7 - 6 | Rauch (8-2) | Valverde (1-4) | Cordero (26) | 29,839 | 67-52 |
| 120 | August 14 | @ Marlins | 14 - 5 | Willis (8-12) | Kim (6-6) | | 10,610 | 67-53 |
| 121 | August 15 | @ Marlins | 9 - 6 | Davis (10-10) | Mitre (5-6) | Valverde (36) | 11,472 | 68-53 |
| 122 | August 16 | @ Marlins | 5 - 4 | Hernández (9-7) | Barone (0-1) | Valverde (37) | 11,516 | 69-53 |
| 123 | August 17 | @ Braves | 4 - 0 | Webb (13-8) | Cormier (0-3) | | 33,248 | 70-53 |
| 124 | August 18 | @ Braves | 12 - 6 | Owings (6-6) | Carlyle (7-5) | | 48,643 | 71-53 |
| 125 | August 19 | @ Braves | 6 - 2 | Smoltz (11-6) | Petit (2-4) | | 30,818 | 71-54 |
| 126 | August 20 | Brewers | 9 - 0 | Gallardo (5-3) | Davis (10-11) | Villanueva (1) | 26,900 | 71-55 |
| 127 | August 21 | Brewers | 7 - 4 | Bush (10-9) | Hernández (9-8) | Cordero (37) | 27,784 | 71-56 |
| 128 | August 22 | Brewers | 3 - 2 | Webb (14-8) | Suppan (8-11) | Valverde (38) | 31,720 | 72-56 |
| 129 | August 24 | Cubs | 6 - 2 | Marshall (7-6) | Owings (6-7) | Dempster (21) | 36,700 | 72-57 |
| 130 | August 25 | Cubs | 3 - 1 | Davis (11-11) | Lilly (13-7) | Valverde (39) | 46,173 | 73-57 |
| 131 | August 26 | Cubs | 5 - 4 | González (6-2) | Marquis (10-8) | Valverde (40) | 38,902 | 74-57 |
| 132 | August 27 | @ Padres | 3 - 1 | Peavy (15-5) | Hernández (9-9) | Hoffman (34) | 25,763 | 74-58 |
| 133 | August 28 | @ Padres | 6 - 4 | Germano (7-7) | Webb (14-9) | Hoffman (35) | 23,006 | 74-59 |
| 134 | August 29 | @ Padres | 3 - 1 | Cameron (2-0) | Slaten (3-2) | Bell (2) | 29,021 | 74-60 |
| 135 | August 30 | @ Padres | 8 - 7 | Davis (12-11) | Young (9-5) | Valverde (41) | 28,554 | 75-60 |
| 136 | August 31 | Rockies | 7 - 3 | Herges (3-0) | Peña (5-3) | | 26,127 | 75-61 |

September (15-11)

| # | Date | Opponent | Score | Win | Loss | Save | Attendance | Record |
|---|---|---|---|---|---|---|---|---|
| 137 | September 1 | Rockies | 13 - 7 | González (7-2) | Dessens (2-2) | | 29,119 | 76-61 |
| 138 | September 2 | Rockies | 4 - 3 | Fogg (8-9) | Webb (14-10) | Corpas (12) | 26,776 | 76-62 |
| 139 | September 3 | Padres | 10 - 2 | Maddux (11-9) | Owings (6-8) | | 30,531 | 76-63 |
| 140 | September 4 | Padres | 9 - 1 | Davis (13-11) | Young (9-6) | | 26,063 | 77-63 |
| 141 | September 5 | Padres | 9 - 6 | Hernández (10-9) | Peavy (16-6) | Valverde (42) | 28,065 | 78-63 |
| 142 | September 7 | Cardinals | 4 - 2 | Webb (15-10) | Wainwright (13-10) | Valverde (43) | 31,225 | 79-63 |
| 143 | September 8 | Cardinals | 9 - 8 | Eveland (1-0) | Wellemeyer (3-3) | Valverde (44) | 45,931 | 80-63 |
| 144 | September 9 | Cardinals | 6 - 5 | Petit (3-4) | Franklin (4-3) | Valverde (45) | 35,136 | 81-63 |
| 145 | September 10 | @ Giants | 5 - 3 | Peguero (1-0) | Hennessey (3-5) | Peña (2) | 33,498 | 82-63 |
| 146 | September 11 | @ Giants | 2 - 1 | Walker (2-0) | Wickman (3-4) | Wilson (3) | 33,633 | 82-64 |
| 147 | September 12 | @ Giants | 9 - 4 | Webb (16-10) | Sánchez (1-4) | | 37,083 | 83-64 |
| 148 | September 14 | @ Dodgers | 7 - 4 | Penny (16-4) | Davis (13-12) | Saito (39) | 54,014 | 83-65 |
| 149 | September 15 | @ Dodgers | 6 - 2 | Lowe (12-12) | Hernández (10-10) | | 48,366 | 83-66 |
| 150 | September 16 | @ Dodgers | 6 - 1 | González (8-2) | Loaiza (2-2) | | 51,460 | 84-66 |
| 151 | September 17 | Giants | 8 - 5 | Munter (1-0) | Peña (5-4) | Wilson (4) | 31,122 | 84-67 |
| 152 | September 18 | Giants | 5 - 0 | Owings (7-8) | Sánchez (1-5) | | 44,220 | 85-67 |
| 153 | September 19 | Giants | 6 - 4 | Cruz (6-1) | Zito (9-13) | Valverde (46) | 42,855 | 86-67 |
| 154 | September 21 | Dodgers | 12 - 3 | Hernández (11-10) | Loaiza (2-3) | | 37,753 | 87-67 |
| 155 | September 22 | Dodgers | 6 - 2 | Webb (17-10) | Wells (8-9) | | 47,673 | 88-67 |
| 156 | September 23 | Dodgers | 7 - 1 | Billingsley (12-5) | González (8-3) | | 43,372 | 88-68 |
| 157 | September 25 | @ Pirates | 6 - 5 | Torres (2-4) | Lyon (6-4) | Capps (18) | 14,569 | 88-69 |
| 158 | September 26 | @ Pirates | 5 - 1 | Morris (10-11) | Hernández (11-11) | | 16,289 | 88-70 |
| 159 | September 27 | @ Pirates | 8 - 0 | Owings (8-8) | Van Benschoten (0-7) | | 11,335 | 89-70 |
| 160 | September 28 | @ Rockies | 4 - 2 | Webb (18-10) | Francis (17-9) | Valverde (47) | 48,190 | 90-70 |
| 161 | September 29 | @ Rockies | 11 - 1 | Redman (2-4) | González (8-4) | | 47,368 | 90-71 |
| 162 | September 30 | @ Rockies | 4 - 3 | Fuentes (3-5) | Nippert (1-1) | Corpas (19) | 46,375 | 90-72 |

- Diamondbacks Win
- Diamondbacks Loss
- Game Postponed

== Playoffs ==
=== NLDS vs. Chicago Cubs ===
| Game | Score | Date | Starters | Time (EDT) | Location | Attendance |
|---|---|---|---|---|---|---|
| 1 | Chicago Cubs 1 at Arizona Diamondbacks 3 | October 3 | Carlos Zambrano (ND) vs. Brandon Webb (1–0) | 10:07 p.m. | Chase Field, Phoenix, Arizona | 48,864 |
| 2 | Chicago Cubs 4 at Arizona Diamondbacks 8 | October 4 | Ted Lilly vs. Doug Davis | 10:07 p.m. | Chase Field, Phoenix, Arizona | 48,575 |
| 3 | Arizona Diamondbacks 5 at Chicago Cubs 1 | October 6 | Liván Hernández vs. Rich Hill | 6:07 p.m. | Wrigley Field, Chicago | 42,157 |

=== NLCS vs. Colorado Rockies ===
| Game | Score | Date | Starters | Time (EDT) | Location | Attendance |
|---|---|---|---|---|---|---|
| 1 | Colorado Rockies 5 at Arizona Diamondbacks 1 | October 11 | Jeff Francis (1–0), Brandon Webb (0–1) | 8:35pm | Chase Field, Phoenix, Arizona | 48,142 |
| 2 | Colorado Rockies 3 at Arizona Diamondbacks 2 (11) | October 12 | Ubaldo Jiménez (ND), Doug Davis (ND) | 10:15pm | Chase Field, Phoenix, Arizona | 48,219 |
| 3 | Arizona Diamondbacks 1 at Colorado Rockies 4 | October 14 | Liván Hernández (0–1), Josh Fogg (1-–) | 8:35pm | Coors Field, Denver, Colorado | 50,137 |
| 4 | Arizona Diamondbacks 4 at Colorado Rockies 6 | October 15 | Micah Owings (0–1), Franklin Morales (0–0) (ND) | 10:15pm | Coors Field, Denver, Colorado | 50,213 |

== Player stats ==
=== Batting ===
Note: G=Games played; AB=At bats; R=Runs scored; H=Hits; 2B=Doubles; 3B=Triples; HR=Home runs; RBI=Runs batted in; AVG=Batting average; SB=Stolen bases

| Player | G | AB | R | H | 2B | 3B | HR | RBI | AVG | SB |
|---|---|---|---|---|---|---|---|---|---|---|
| Emilio Bonifacio | 11 | 23 | 2 | 5 | 1 | 0 | 0 | 2 | .217 | 0 |
| Eric Byrnes | 160 | 626 | 103 | 179 | 30 | 8 | 21 | 83 | .286 | 50 |
| Alberto Callaspo | 56 | 144 | 10 | 31 | 8 | 0 | 0 | 7 | .215 | 1 |
| Randy Choate | 2 | 0 | 0 | 0 | 0 | 0 | 0 | 0 | .000 | 0 |
| Jeff Cirillo | 28 | 40 | 6 | 8 | 4 | 0 | 0 | 6 | .200 | 0 |
| Tony Clark | 113 | 221 | 31 | 55 | 5 | 1 | 17 | 51 | .249 | 0 |
| Juan Cruz | 50 | 2 | 0 | 0 | 0 | 0 | 0 | 0 | .000 | 0 |
| Jeff DaVanon | 13 | 26 | 5 | 4 | 2 | 0 | 0 | 1 | .154 | 1 |
| Doug Davis | 32 | 58 | 3 | 4 | 0 | 0 | 0 | 1 | .069 | 0 |
| Stephen Drew | 150 | 543 | 60 | 129 | 28 | 4 | 12 | 60 | .238 | 9 |
| Dana Eveland | 5 | 0 | 0 | 0 | 0 | 0 | 0 | 0 | .000 | 0 |
| Édgar González | 30 | 21 | 0 | 4 | 0 | 0 | 0 | 0 | .190 | 0 |
| Robby Hammock | 34 | 45 | 5 | 11 | 2 | 0 | 0 | 0 | .244 | 0 |
| Liván Hernández | 33 | 75 | 9 | 16 | 1 | 0 | 1 | 5 | .213 | 0 |
| Orlando Hudson | 139 | 517 | 69 | 152 | 28 | 9 | 10 | 63 | .294 | 10 |
| Conor Jackson | 130 | 415 | 56 | 118 | 29 | 1 | 15 | 60 | .284 | 2 |
| Randy Johnson | 10 | 15 | 0 | 1 | 0 | 0 | 0 | 0 | .067 | 0 |
| Joe Kennedy | 3 | 0 | 0 | 0 | 0 | 0 | 0 | 0 | .000 | 0 |
| Brandon Lyon | 70 | 0 | 0 | 0 | 0 | 0 | 0 | 0 | .000 | 0 |
| Brandon Medders | 30 | 0 | 0 | 0 | 0 | 0 | 0 | 0 | .000 | 0 |
| Miguel Montero | 84 | 214 | 30 | 48 | 7 | 0 | 10 | 37 | .224 | 0 |
| Bill Murphy | 10 | 0 | 0 | 0 | 0 | 0 | 0 | 0 | .000 | 0 |
| Dustin Nippert | 36 | 2 | 0 | 0 | 0 | 0 | 0 | 0 | .000 | 0 |
| Augie Ojeda | 57 | 113 | 16 | 31 | 2 | 2 | 1 | 12 | .274 | 1 |
| Micah Owings | 34 | 60 | 9 | 20 | 7 | 1 | 4 | 15 | .333 | 0 |
| Jailen Peguero | 16 | 0 | 0 | 0 | 0 | 0 | 0 | 0 | .000 | 0 |
| Tony Peña | 72 | 4 | 1 | 1 | 0 | 0 | 0 | 1 | .250 | 0 |
| Yusmeiro Petit | 14 | 16 | 2 | 1 | 0 | 0 | 0 | 0 | .063 | 0 |
| Carlos Quentin | 81 | 229 | 29 | 49 | 16 | 0 | 5 | 31 | .214 | 2 |
| Mark Reynolds | 111 | 366 | 62 | 102 | 20 | 4 | 17 | 62 | .279 | 0 |
| Donnie Sadler | 1 | 1 | 0 | 0 | 0 | 0 | 0 | 0 | .000 | 0 |
| Jeff Salazar | 38 | 94 | 13 | 26 | 6 | 1 | 1 | 10 | .277 | 2 |
| Mike Schultz | 1 | 0 | 0 | 0 | 0 | 0 | 0 | 0 | .000 | 0 |
| Doug Slaten | 58 | 0 | 0 | 0 | 0 | 0 | 0 | 0 | .000 | 0 |
| Jason Smith | 2 | 4 | 0 | 1 | 0 | 0 | 0 | 0 | .250 | 0 |
| Chris Snyder | 110 | 326 | 37 | 82 | 20 | 0 | 13 | 47 | .252 | 0 |
| Chad Tracy | 76 | 227 | 30 | 60 | 18 | 2 | 7 | 35 | .264 | 0 |
| Justin Upton | 43 | 140 | 17 | 31 | 8 | 3 | 2 | 11 | .221 | 2 |
| José Valverde | 63 | 0 | 0 | 0 | 0 | 0 | 0 | 0 | .000 | 0 |
| Brandon Webb | 32 | 73 | 1 | 6 | 2 | 0 | 0 | 3 | .082 | 0 |
| Bob Wickman | 8 | 0 | 0 | 0 | 0 | 0 | 0 | 0 | .000 | 0 |
| Chris Young | 148 | 569 | 85 | 135 | 29 | 3 | 32 | 68 | .237 | 27 |
| Team totals | 162 | 5398 | 712 | 1350 | 286 | 40 | 171 | 687 | .250 | 109 |

=== Pitching ===
Note: W=Wins; L=Losses; ERA=Earned run average; G=Games pitched; GS=Games started; SV=Saves; IP=Innings pitched; R=Runs allowed; ER=Earned runs allowed; BB=Walks allowed; K=Strikeouts

| Player | W | L | ERA | G | GS | SV | IP | R | ER | BB | K |
|---|---|---|---|---|---|---|---|---|---|---|---|
| Randy Choate | 0 | 0 | ---- | 2 | 0 | 0 | 0.0 | 0 | 0 | 0 | 0 |
| Jeff Cirillo | 0 | 0 | 0.00 | 1 | 0 | 0 | 1.0 | 0 | 0 | 2 | 1 |
| Juan Cruz | 6 | 1 | 3.10 | 53 | 0 | 0 | 61.0 | 28 | 21 | 32 | 87 |
| Doug Davis | 13 | 12 | 4.25 | 33 | 33 | 0 | 192.2 | 100 | 91 | 95 | 144 |
| J.D. Durbin | 0 | 0 | 94.50 | 1 | 0 | 0 | 0.2 | 7 | 7 | 1 | 1 |
| Dana Eveland | 1 | 0 | 14.40 | 5 | 1 | 0 | 5.0 | 8 | 8 | 5 | 3 |
| Édgar González | 8 | 4 | 5.03 | 32 | 12 | 0 | 102.0 | 61 | 57 | 28 | 62 |
| Enrique González | 0 | 0 | 13.50 | 1 | 0 | 0 | 2.0 | 4 | 3 | 1 | 0 |
| Liván Hernández | 11 | 11 | 4.93 | 33 | 33 | 0 | 204.1 | 116 | 112 | 79 | 90 |
| Randy Johnson | 4 | 3 | 3.81 | 10 | 10 | 0 | 56.2 | 26 | 24 | 13 | 72 |
| Joe Kennedy | 0 | 0 | 20.25 | 3 | 0 | 0 | 2.2 | 7 | 6 | 2 | 1 |
| Byung-hyun Kim | 0 | 1 | 23.63 | 2 | 2 | 0 | 2.2 | 9 | 7 | 2 | 3 |
| Brandon Lyon | 6 | 4 | 2.68 | 73 | 0 | 2 | 74.0 | 25 | 22 | 22 | 40 |
| Brandon Medders | 1 | 2 | 4.30 | 30 | 0 | 0 | 29.1 | 16 | 14 | 16 | 23 |
| Bill Murphy | 0 | 0 | 5.68 | 10 | 0 | 0 | 6.1 | 4 | 4 | 7 | 2 |
| Dustin Nippert | 1 | 1 | 5.56 | 36 | 0 | 0 | 45.1 | 30 | 28 | 16 | 38 |
| Augie Ojeda | 0 | 0 | 0.00 | 1 | 0 | 0 | 1.0 | 0 | 0 | 0 | 0 |
| Micah Owings | 8 | 8 | 4.30 | 29 | 27 | 0 | 152.2 | 81 | 73 | 50 | 106 |
| Jailen Peguero | 1 | 0 | 9.20 | 18 | 0 | 0 | 14.2 | 15 | 15 | 13 | 9 |
| Tony Peña | 5 | 4 | 3.27 | 75 | 0 | 2 | 85.1 | 36 | 31 | 31 | 63 |
| Yusmeiro Petit | 3 | 4 | 4.58 | 14 | 10 | 0 | 57.0 | 30 | 29 | 18 | 40 |
| Mike Schultz | 0 | 0 | 0.00 | 1 | 0 | 0 | 1.0 | 0 | 0 | 0 | 1 |
| Doug Slaten | 3 | 2 | 2.72 | 61 | 0 | 0 | 36.1 | 15 | 11 | 14 | 28 |
| José Valverde | 1 | 4 | 2.66 | 65 | 0 | 47 | 64.1 | 21 | 19 | 26 | 78 |
| Brandon Webb | 18 | 10 | 3.01 | 34 | 34 | 0 | 236.1 | 91 | 79 | 72 | 194 |
| Bob Wickman | 0 | 1 | 1.35 | 8 | 0 | 0 | 6.2 | 2 | 1 | 1 | 2 |
| Team totals | 90 | 72 | 4.13 | 162 | 162 | 51 | 1441.0 | 732 | 662 | 546 | 1088 |

== Farm system ==
| Level | Team | League | Manager |
|---|---|---|---|
| AAA | Tucson Sidewinders | Pacific Coast League | Bill Plummer |
| AA | Mobile BayBears | Southern League | Brett Butler and Matt Williams |
| A | Visalia Oaks | California League | Héctor de la Cruz |
| A | South Bend Silver Hawks | Midwest League | Mark Haley |
| A-Short Season | Yakima Bears | Northwest League | Mike Bell |
| Rookie | Missoula Osprey | Pioneer League | Damon Mashore |
