= 2007 National League Championship Series =

Baseball tournament

Team (Wins)	Managers	Season
Colorado Rockies (4)	Clint Hurdle	90–73, .552, GB: 1/2
Arizona Diamondbacks (0)	Bob Melvin	90–72, .556, GA: 1/2
- Dates: October 11–15
- MVP: Matt Holliday (Colorado)
- Umpires: Tim McClelland; Mark Wegner; Larry Vanover; Tom Hallion; Angel Hernandez; Jim Joyce

Broadcast
- Television: TBS
- TV announcers: Chip Caray, Tony Gwynn, Bob Brenly and Craig Sager
- Radio: ESPN
- Radio announcers: Dan Shulman and Dave Campbell
- NLDS: Arizona Diamondbacks over Chicago Cubs (3–0); Colorado Rockies over Philadelphia Phillies (3–0)

The 2007 National League Championship Series (NLCS), the second round of the National League side in Major League Baseball’s 2007 postseason, began on October 11 and ended on October 15. It was a best-of-seven series, with the West Division champion and top-seeded Arizona Diamondbacks facing the divisional rival wild card winner Colorado Rockies. The Rockies swept the series in four games to win their first ever pennant, extending a 17–1 run to 21–1 in the process. The Rockies won the opportunity to play the American League champion Boston Red Sox in the 2007 World Series, where they were swept 4-0. Colorado's NLCS sweep was only the second NLCS sweep since the seven-game format was adopted in 1985, with the first being the Atlanta Braves' sweep in 1995.

The Rockies had swept the Philadelphia Phillies in three games in the NL Division Series, while the Diamondbacks had swept the Chicago Cubs. The Diamondbacks had home-field advantage due to winning the division. The series marked the first time the Rockies ever advanced to the NLCS and the second time for the Diamondbacks, in the first postseason matchup between the two teams; the Rockies' only prior postseason appearance was in 1995. It was the first time that two West Division teams had ever met in the NLCS, only the second to feature expansion franchises (the first being 1986) and the first of only two postseason meetings of any kind between teams that joined MLB in the 1990s (the other meeting being the 2017 NL Wild Card Game between the same two clubs).

The series was telecast on TBS, the first time a League Championship Series was ever shown exclusively on a cable network.

== Summary ==
=== Arizona Diamondbacks vs. Colorado Rockies ===
Colorado won the series, 4–0.

Game	Date	Score	Location	Time	Attendance
1	October 11	Colorado Rockies – 5, Arizona Diamondbacks – 1	Chase Field	3:12	48,142
2	October 12	Colorado Rockies – 3, Arizona Diamondbacks – 2 (11)	Chase Field	4:26	48,219
3	October 14	Arizona Diamondbacks – 1, Colorado Rockies – 4	Coors Field	3:04	50,137
4	October 15	Arizona Diamondbacks – 4, Colorado Rockies – 6	Coors Field	3:17	50,213

== Game summaries ==
=== Game 1 ===
Thursday, October 11, 2007 5:37 pm (MDT) at Chase Field in Phoenix, Arizona 93 °F (34 °C), roof open; clear
Team	1	2	3	4	5	6	7	8	9	R	H	E
Colorado	0	1	3	0	0	0	1	0	0	5	8	0
Arizona	1	0	0	0	0	0	0	0	0	1	9	1
WP: Jeff Francis (1–0) LP: Brandon Webb (0–1)

The Rockies took a 1–0 series lead behind a strong 6 2/3 innings from starter Jeff Francis. Arizona scored first when Stephen Drew singled with one out in the first and scored on Eric Byrnes's RBI double, but the Rockies tied the game in the second when they loaded the bases off of Brandon Webb on two hits and a walk with no outs and Troy Tulowitzki hit into a double play that scored Todd Helton. Next inning, Willy Taveras singled with one out, stole second, and scored on Kazuo Matsui's RBI single. Matt Holliday then singled before Helton lined out to center. A wild pitch and walk loaded the bases, and Brad Hawpe's two-run single made it 4-1 Rockies. In the seventh, reliever Juan Cruz issued a leadoff walk to Yorvit Torrealba, who moved to second on a wild pitch and then to third on Francis's sacrifice bunt. After Taveras struck out, Diamondbacks first baseman Conor Jackson's fielding error on Matsui's ground ball allowed Torrealba to score to make it 5-1 Rockies. In the bottom of the inning, Francis allowed a leadoff double to Chris Snyder and hit Justin Upton with a pitch, but the Diamondbacks were taken out of a potential rally when a disputed interference call resulted in a double-play groundout for Augie Ojeda. Chase Field patrons responded by throwing objects onto the playing field, briefly stopping play. Though they loaded the bases on Jeff Cirillo's bunt single and Chris Young's walk off of reliever Matt Herges, Jeremy Affeldt got Drew to fly out to right to end the inning. Pinch hitter Miguel Montero singled with two outs in the bottom of the ninth off of Manny Corpas, but was tagged out at second to end the game.

=== Game 2 ===
Friday, October 12, 2007 7:19 pm (MDT) at Chase Field in Phoenix, Arizona 87 °F (31 °C), roof open; clear
Team	1	2	3	4	5	6	7	8	9	10	11	R	H	E
Colorado	0	1	0	0	1	0	0	0	0	0	1	3	7	1
Arizona	0	0	1	0	0	0	0	0	1	0	0	2	9	1
WP: Manny Corpas (1–0) LP: José Valverde (0–1) Sv: Ryan Speier (1)

The Rockies struck first in Game 1 off of Diamondbacks' starter Doug Davis when Todd Helton reached on third baseman Mark Reynolds's ground ball fielding error, moved to third on Brad Hawpe's single two outs later, and scored on Yorvit Torrealba's single. The Diamondbacks tied it in the third when Davis hit a leadoff double off of Ubaldo Jiménez and scored on Chris Young's single. Willy Taveras walked to lead off the fifth off of Davis and moved to second on Kazuo Matsui's single. Matt Holliday's fly out moved the runners up one base before Helton's sacrifice fly put the Rockies up 2-1. In the bottom of the ninth, Colorado closer Manny Corpas blew the save when he hit Young with a pitch with one out and subsequently allowed a single to Stephen Drew. Eric Byrnes grounded to third baseman Matsui, who made an errant throw to second, allowing Young to score and tie the game, but unaware of this, Drew wandered off second base, allowing shortstop Troy Tulowitzski to tag him out at third. Tony Clark grounded out to send the game into extra innings. Jose Valverde retired the Rockies in order in the 10th, but in the 11th, allowed a single and two walks to load the bases with two outs before walking Taveras to put the Rockies up 3-2. Doug Slaten in relief got Matsui to line out to right to end the inning, but Ryan Speier, in relief of Corpas, retired the Diamondbacks in order in the bottom of the inning to end the game and put the Rockies up 2-0 in the series shifting to Coors Field.

=== Game 3 ===
Sunday, October 14, 2007 6:37 pm (MDT) at Coors Field in Denver, Colorado 41 °F (5 °C), rain
Team	1	2	3	4	5	6	7	8	9	R	H	E
Arizona	0	0	0	1	0	0	0	0	0	1	8	0
Colorado	1	0	0	0	0	3	0	0	X	4	9	0
WP: Josh Fogg (1–0) LP: Liván Hernández (0–1) Sv: Manny Corpas (1); Home runs: AZ: Mark Reynolds (1); COL: Matt Holliday (1), Yorvit Torrealba (1)

The Rockies moved to within one win of the World Series for the first time in franchise history by winning Game 3 by a score of 4–1. Matt Holliday gave them a 1–0 lead in the first with a two-out solo home run off Arizona starter Liván Hernández (a veteran of postseason play), but Mark Reynolds tied the game in the fourth with a tape measure home run to left off of Josh Fogg. The decisive blow was delivered in the bottom of the sixth when Yorvit Torrealba battled in an eight-pitch at-bat to drive a three-run home run to left field off of Hernandez that sent Coors Field into a frenzy. Memorably, Torrealba pumped his fist in the air while rounding second base. Fogg pitched six good innings and Manny Corpas got the save to give the Rockies a 3–0 lead in the series. Despite them eventually sweeping Arizona, this was the only game where they outhit them.

=== Game 4 ===
Monday, October 15, 2007 8:21 pm (MDT) at Coors Field in Denver, Colorado 55 °F (13 °C), clear
Team	1	2	3	4	5	6	7	8	9	R	H	E
Arizona	0	0	1	0	0	0	0	3	0	4	10	1
Colorado	0	0	0	6	0	0	0	0	X	6	6	1
WP: Matt Herges (1–0) LP: Micah Owings (0–1) Sv: Manny Corpas (2); Home runs: AZ: Chris Snyder (1); COL: Matt Holliday (2)

The Rockies won their first pennant in franchise history with a 6–4 win in Game 4, completing a sweep of the number one seed Arizona Diamondbacks. The Diamondbacks struck first when Micah Owings singled to lead off the third off of starter Franklin Morales, moved to second two outs later on a walk, and scored on Conor Jackson's single. The Rockies struck back with a six-run fourth inning. Owings walked Brad Hawpe and Troy Tulowitzki with one out. Yorvit Torrealba's ground out moved them one base each before pinch hitter Seth Smith's two-run bloop double down the left-field line one out later put the Rockies up 2-1. Arizona first baseman Jackson's fielding error allowed Willy Taveras to reach base and move Smith to third. Kazuo Matsui's single scored Smith before NLCS MVP Matt Holliday's three-run home run to deep center put the Rockies up 6-1. Diamondback relievers Juan Cruz and Brandon Lyon held them hitless for the rest of the game. Brian Fuentes allowed a leadoff single to Stephen Drew in the eighth, then another single to Jackson one out later before Chris Snyder cut the Rockies lead to 6-4 with a two-out, three-run home run to left that stayed just fair. After Justin Upton tripled, Manny Corpas then came on and struck out Tony Clark to end the inning. Corpas allowed a one-out double to Young in the ninth, but got Drew to pop out to second and Eric Byrnes, the center of controversy before Game 3, to hit a check-swing roller to Troy Tulowitzki, who fired to Todd Helton at first to retire the diving Byrnes and send Colorado to the 2007 World Series against the Boston Red Sox. No team had ever swept their way to the World Series since the Division Series began in 1995. Colorado was also the first team to have a 7–0 start to a postseason since the 1976 Cincinnati Reds finished the playoffs 7–0 sweeping both the LCS and World Series.

== Composite box ==
2007 NLCS (4–0): Colorado Rockies over Arizona Diamondbacks

Team	1	2	3	4	5	6	7	8	9	10	11	R	H	E
Colorado Rockies	1	2	3	6	1	3	1	0	0	0	1	18	30	2
Arizona Diamondbacks	1	0	2	1	0	0	0	3	1	0	0	8	36	3
Total attendance: 196,711 Average attendance: 49,178

== Aftermath ==
With the NLCS win, Colorado became the fourth second-place team (also known as a wild card) to beat a team within the same division that won their division in the playoffs, joining the 1997 Florida Marlins, 2004 Boston Red Sox, and the 2005 Houston Astros. In subsequent years, this became more common as MLB expanded to more postseason teams over time and the rule where you could not play a division opponent in the LDS was also eliminated. For example, the National League East wild card team defeated the division winner three years in a row from 2022–2024 in the National League Division Series. Similar results occurred to the National League West from 2021–2023.

Due to a scheduling quirk and the ALCS between Boston and Cleveland going a full seven games, the Rockies' eight-day layoff between the NLCS and World Series was the longest in MLB postseason history. Many Rockies players felt the layoff hurt them in World Series, as they had previously been red hot, winning 21 of 22 games. The 2007 postseason would ultimately be remembered for winning streaks, as the Red Sox erased a 3-1 series deficit in the ALCS and went on to sweep the Rockies in the World Series, thus in the process, winning their last seven games.

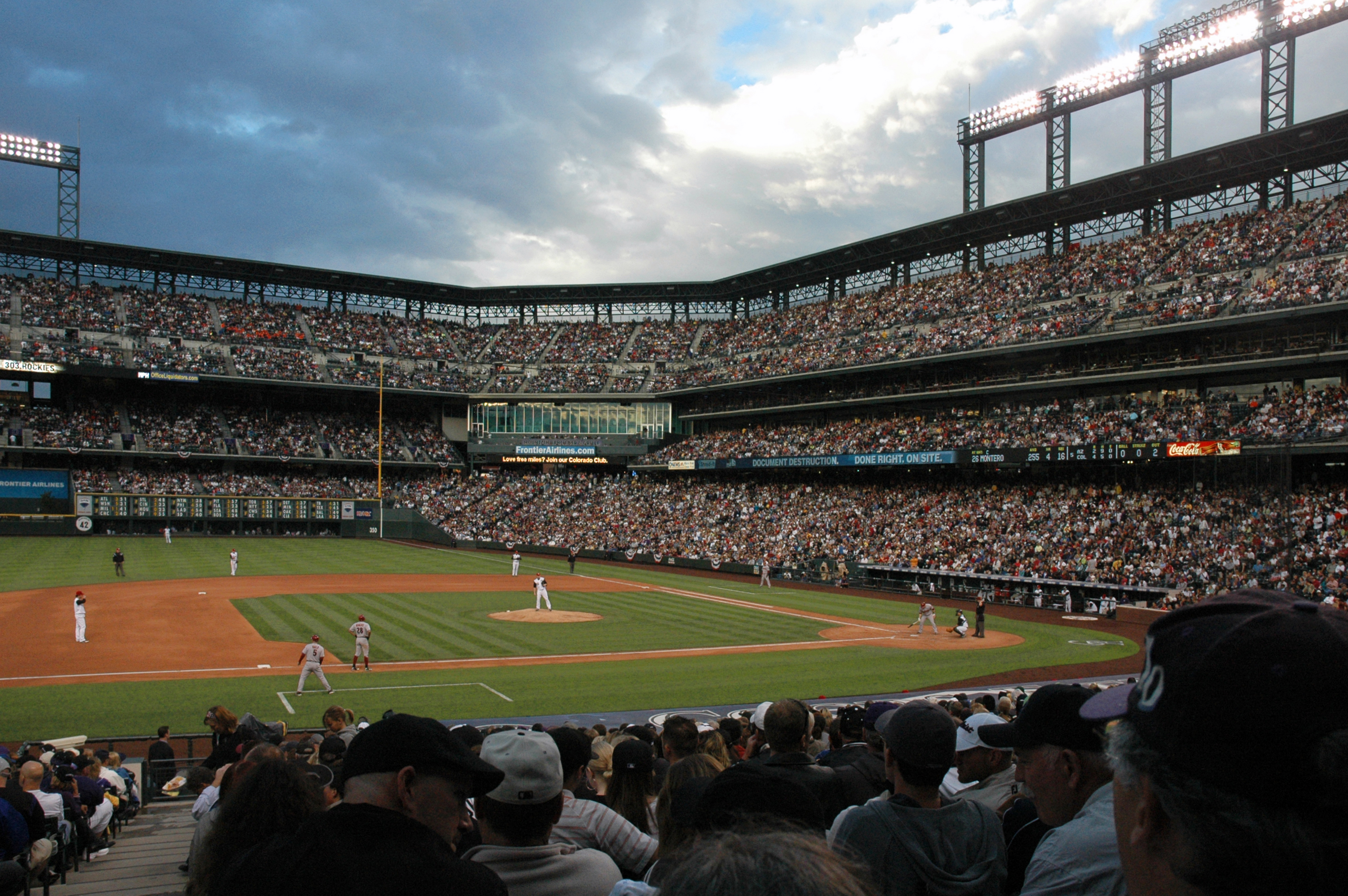
Rockies and Diamondbacks at Coors Field on the Fourth of July in 2009

The 2007 Diamondbacks and Rockies proved to be a one-season anomalies. From 2003–2010, the 2007 Diamondbacks were the only postseason team. The Diamondbacks led the NL West most of the 2008 season, but a late season collapse saw them miss the postseason entirely. They would bottom out at 65–97 in 2010 before making the postseason again in 2011, with practically a brand new team compared to 2007. Meanwhile, the Rockies made the playoffs in 2009, but were defeated by the Phillies in the NLDS in a rematch of the 2007 NLDS. From 2008–2016, the Rockies were a cumulative 120 games under .500. 2007 was also the last NL Championship Series appearance for either the Rockies or Diamondbacks until 2023, when Arizona beat Los Angeles in the NLDS. In the NLCS, they would knock off Philadelphia in seven games before losing to the Texas Rangers in the World Series in five.

The Diamondbacks and Rockies met again in the postseason during the 2017 National League Wild Card Game, with the Diamondbacks winning by a score of 11–8. To date, 2007 was the only time the Diamondbacks and Rockies finished 1–2 in the standings of the National League West. This was also the first time two NL West teams met in an NLCS, and as of 2025, it is the only time this has occurred.
