= Édgar González (pitcher) =

Mexican baseball player (born 1983)

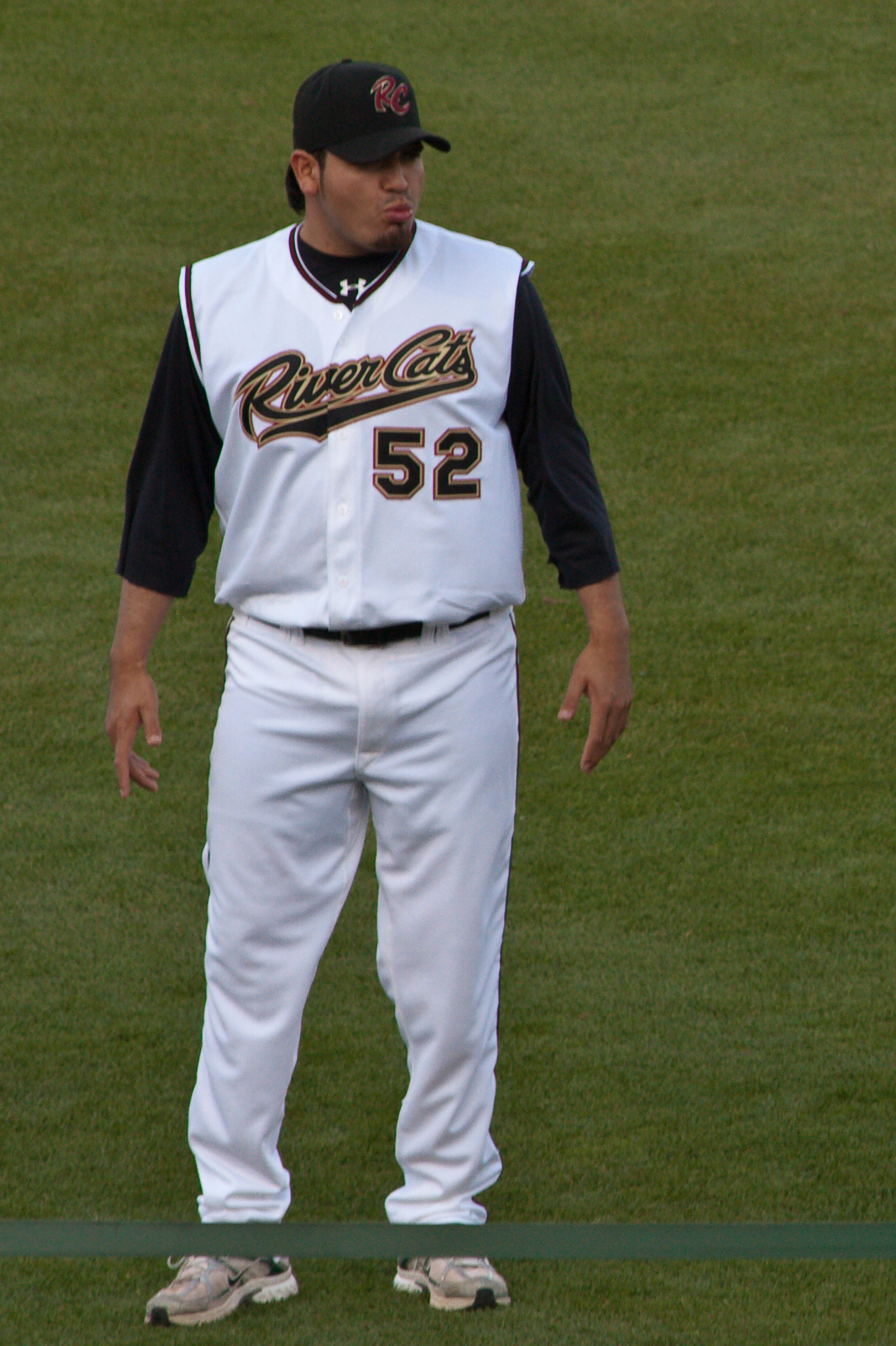
- González with the Sacramento River Cats
- Pitcher
- Born: February 23, 1983 (age 43); Monterrey, Nuevo León, Mexico
- Batted: Right Threw: Right

Professional debut
- MLB: June 1, 2003, for the Arizona Diamondbacks
- KBO: March 27, 2010, for the LG Twins

Last appearance
- KBO: June 21, 2010, for the LG Twins
- MLB: May 25, 2013, for the Houston Astros

MLB statistics
- Win–loss record: 17–27
- Earned run average: 5.92
- Strikeouts: 237

KBO statistics
- Win–loss record: 0–6
- Earned run average: 7.68
- Strikeouts: 23
- Stats at Baseball Reference

Teams
- Arizona Diamondbacks (2003–2008); Oakland Athletics (2009); LG Twins (2010); Colorado Rockies (2011); Houston Astros (2012); Toronto Blue Jays (2013); Houston Astros (2013)

Édgar Gerardo González Elizondo (born February 23, 1983) is a Mexican former professional baseball pitcher. He has previously played in Major League Baseball (MLB) for the Arizona Diamondbacks, Oakland Athletics, Colorado Rockies, Houston Astros, and Toronto Blue Jays, and in the KBO League for the LG Twins.

González was the sixth major leaguer from Monterrey, Nuevo León, Mexico, joining Óscar Villarreal, Felipe Montemayor, Bobby Treviño, Héctor Torres, and Alex Treviño. He was the 94th native of Mexico to appear in the majors and the 53rd pitcher from Mexico to work a big league game when he debuted with the Diamondbacks on June 1, 2003. At that time, he was the youngest pitcher in Major League Baseball, at 20 years old.

He throws a 4-seam fastball, slider, 2-seam fastball, and a changeup.

== Professional career ==
=== Arizona Diamondbacks ===
González signed with the Arizona Diamondbacks as a non-drafted free agent on April 18, 2000. When he did not report for his assignment in the Dominican Republic, he was placed on the suspended list for 2000-2001. He was assigned to Single-A South Bend Silver Hawks of the Midwest League in 2002. On April 14, in only his second professional start, he tossed a no-hitter against West Michigan for his first professional win. He did not issue a walk and faced the minimum 27 batters because he picked off the only baserunner of the game (reached on an error). He was 11–8 with a 2.91 ERA and 110 strikeouts with South Bend before earning a promotion to the High-A Lancaster JetHawks of the California League in August, the last month of the season. He finished in Lancaster 3–0 with a 0.78 ERA and 21 strikeouts against 3 walks in 4 games started. His 14 victories in 2002 tied for second among Arizona minor leaguers. He was pitcher of the month of August in the Arizona farm system after combining 5–0 with a 1.18 combined in the two levels.

González was assigned to the Double-A El Paso Diablos of the Texas League in 2003. His stay at El Paso was a short one, with only 6 games started and going 2–2 with a 3.50 ERA before being called up early May to the Triple-A Tucson Sidewinders. He went 3–2 with Tucson before being called to the major league team for a brief stay. He finished the season at Tucson with an 8–7 record and a 3.75 ERA in 20 games. He was selected to participate in the All-Star Futures Game on July 13 in Chicago, working a scoreless frame for the World Team.

González was promoted on June 1, 2003, to face the San Diego Padres at Qualcomm Stadium. Arizona won the game 10–4. He picked up his first major league win, pitching 5.2 innings allowing 10 hits for 3 runs and striking out 4. He also collected his first major league hit. He had another start on June 6 against the Indians at Arizona where he took his first loss before returning to Tucson. When the rosters expanded in September, he was called up and pitched in 7 games (all in relief). He finished the season with a 2–1 record and a 4.91 ERA.

González had a rough year in the major leagues in 2004, mostly because pitching with a torn fingernail for most of the year ended his season short. In several stints with the big club, he ended with 0–9 record with a 9.32 ERA in 10 starts for the Diamondbacks. His best game came August 29 in Cincinnati where he took a no-hitter to the 7th inning and lost it to an infield hit by Felipe López and later lost the shutout to a home run by Adam Dunn.

2006 was the redemption year for González. After a rough 2004 in MLB and spending almost the complete 2005 season in the minors, Edgar stated his case for a spot in the rotation for the next year. He was called up in June to replace in the rotation Russ Ortiz who was released. He pitched two good games (quality starts), but lost the two because of no run support. After Juan Cruz was activated from the disabled list, González was moved to the bullpen where he struggled to adapt and was demoted to Tucson on July 19 to continue to pitch as a starter. He returned to team on September and took the place in the rotation of struggling Enrique González. He had 3 starts in September, the 3 being excellent games, reaching 7 innings in two of them and not allowing more than 2 runs in each game. He ended the year 3–4 with an ERA of 4.22. His record as a starter was 2–3 with a 3.00 ERA.

2007 was the first year González started the season with the major league club. He earned a spot in the rotation after going 5–0 during spring training. After Randy Johnson was activated from the disabled list, he lost his job to Micah Owings in a tight race. He spent the remainder of the season as the long reliever of the Diamondbacks and making spot starts. He was out of minor league options so he could not be sent to the minor leagues without exposing him to waivers.

Eddy González began the 2008 season in the bullpen, but was moved into the starting rotation when starter Doug Davis was diagnosed with thyroid cancer. In five starts, he was 1–2 with a 6.55 ERA, averaging 4.4 innings per start. He then lost his starting job to Max Scherzer and was moved back to the bullpen after Scherzer pitched 4⅓ innings of perfect relief for González on April 29.

=== Oakland Athletics ===
On February 9, 2009, González signed a minor league contract that included an invitation to spring training with the Oakland Athletics. He appeared in 26 games with Oakland, including 6 starts. He had a 0–4 record and 5.51 ERA with 39 strikeouts in those appearances. In October, González was granted free agency.

=== LG Twins ===
González began the 2010 season with the LG Twins in the KBO League. He was 0–6 with a 7.68 ERA and 23 strikeouts for the Twins before he was released.

=== Sultanes de Monterrey ===
On July 3, 2010, González signed with Sultanes de Monterrey of the Mexican League. In 3 starts for the team, he posted a 1–1 record and 3.18 ERA with 9 strikeouts over 17 innings of work.

=== Los Angeles Dodgers ===
On August 20, 2010, González signed a minor league contract with the Los Angeles Dodgers. He was subsequently assigned to the Triple-A Albuquerque Isotopes, for whom he made four starts and posted a 1–1 record and 4.81 ERA with 29 strikeouts.

=== Tampa Bay Rays ===
On March 2, 2011, González signed a minor league contract with the Tampa Bay Rays. He was released by the organization on June 6, after recording a 4.56 ERA with 54 strikeouts in 53 1/3 innings with the Triple-A Durham Bulls.

=== Colorado Rockies ===
On June 12, 2011, González signed a minor league contract with the Colorado Rockies. On August 10, the Rockies selected González's contract, adding him to their active roster. In one game for Colorado, he allowed two runs on five hits across two innings pitched. González was designated for assignment by the Rockies on August 15. He cleared waivers and was sent outright to the Triple-A Colorado Springs Sky Sox on August 19. González elected free agency on September 30.

On November 3, 2011, Gonzalez signed a minor league contract with the Oakland Athletics organization. He was released prior to the start of the season on March 30, 2012. The next day, González re-signed with the Rockies organization on a minor league contract. In 15 games (7 starts) for Colorado Springs, he compiled a 3–3 record and 5.40 ERA with 40 strikeouts across 46 2/3 innings pitched. González was released by the Rockies on June 19.

=== Sultanes de Monterrey (second stint) ===
On June 26, 2012, González signed with the Sultanes de Monterrey of the Mexican League. In 6 starts for the club, he logged a 2–2 record and 2.84 ERA with 25 strikeouts across 31 2/3 innings pitched.

=== Houston Astros ===
González signed a minor league contract with the Houston Astros on August 23, 2012. On September 3, he had his contract selected to the active roster. In 6 starts for the Astros, González posted a 3–1 record and 5.04 ERA with 18 strikeouts across 25 innings of work. On November 1, he was removed from the 40-man roster and sent outright to the Triple-A Oklahoma City RedHawks.

On November 20, 2012, González re-signed with the Astros organization on a minor league contract. On March 30, 2013, González was selected to Houston's major league roster. On April 5, he was designated for assignment following the acquisition of Travis Blackley.

=== Toronto Blue Jays ===
On April 7, 2013, González was claimed on waivers from the Astros by the Toronto Blue Jays. On April 12, he was removed from the 40-man roster and sent outright to the Triple-A Buffalo Bisons to clear roster space for Casper Wells. González was recalled on May 8 when J. A. Happ was placed on the disabled list. He was designated for assignment the following day. On May 11, González cleared waivers and elected free agency rather than accept an assignment back to Buffalo. In 3 total games for Toronto, he had struggled to a 7.88 ERA with 3 strikeouts over 8 innings.

=== Houston Astros (second stint) ===
On May 12, 2013, González signed a major league contract with the Houston Astros. In 5 total appearances for the Astros, he struggled to a 7.20 ERA with 8 strikeouts across 10 innings pitched. On September 7, González was removed from the 40-man roster and sent outright to the Double-A Corpus Christi Hooks. He elected free agency on October 1.

=== Cincinnati Reds ===
On January 20, 2014, González signed a minor league contract with the Cincinnati Reds organization. He pitched in only 2 games for the Triple-A Louisville Bats, allowing 1 run in 2 innings pitched. González became a free agent after the season.

=== Sultanes de Monterrey (third stint) ===
González signed with the Sultanes de Monterrey of the Mexican League for the 2015 season. He played with the club in 2016, 2017, 2018, and 2019. González did not play in a game in 2020 due to the cancellation of the Mexican League season because of the COVID-19 pandemic. After the 2020 season, he played for Mexico in the 2021 Caribbean Series.

=== El Águila de Veracruz ===
On March 13, 2021, González was loaned to El Águila de Veracruz. In 10 starts, he registered a 2–6 record with a 6.59 ERA and 28 strikeouts in 42 1/3 innings pitched.

=== Acereros de Monclova ===
On July 19, 2021, González was loaned to the Acereros de Monclova for the remainder of the 2021 season. In 4 games (2 starts), he struggled to a 12.91 ERA with 5 strikeouts across 7 2/3 innings pitched.

=== Saraperos de Saltillo ===
On October 6, 2021, González was returned to the Sultanes de Monterrey. However, prior to the 2022 season, on March 23, 2022, he was loaned to the Saraperos de Saltillo. González pitched in 20 games for Saltillo, starting 13 and posting a 1–4 record and 6.75 ERA with 43 strikeouts in 58 2/3 innings of work.

=== Rieleros de Aguascalientes ===
On March 6, 2023, González signed with the Rieleros de Aguascalientes of the Mexican League. In 2 starts, he registered a 0–1 record with a 10.80 ERA in 5 innings pitched.

=== Piratas de Campeche ===
On May 5, 2023, González was traded to the Piratas de Campeche. In 15 games (10 starts) for Campeche, he struggled to an 0–7 record and 8.69 ERA with 18 strikeouts across 39 1/3 innings pitched.

González did not appear for Campeche during the 2024 season. He became a free agent following the season.

== Winter baseball ==
In the winter, he plays in the Mexican Pacific League for the Naranjeros de Hermosillo. During the 2002–2003 season, when he was 19 years old, he was named Rookie of the Year and Pitcher of the Year going 8–1 with a 1.89 ERA.
