= Jailen Peguero =

Dominican baseball player (born 1981)

- Relief pitcher
- Born: January 4, 1981 (age 45); Ázua Province, Dominican Republic
- Batted: Right Threw: Right

MLB debut
- June 8, 2007, for the Arizona Diamondbacks

Last MLB appearance
- September 25, 2008, for the Arizona Diamondbacks

MLB statistics
- Win–loss record: 1-0
- Earned run average: 7.50
- Strikeouts: 14
- Stats at Baseball Reference

Teams
- Arizona Diamondbacks (2007–2008)

Jailen Lorenzo Peguero (born January 4, 1981) is a Dominican professional baseball relief pitcher who is a free agent. He played in Major League Baseball for the Arizona Diamondbacks. His uncle, Leo Peguero, was a minor league player in the Yankees organization. A song in honor of Leo was released in 1999 called Leo Peguero, You Are My Hero.

== Professional career ==
=== Houston Astros ===
On May 18, 2000, Peguero signed with the Houston Astros as an international free agent. He made his professional debut in 2002 with the Low-A Tri-City ValleyCats, posting a 3.44 ERA in 25 appearances. In 2003, Peguero played for the Single-A Lexington Legends, pitching to a 5–13 record and 3.64 ERA in 31 games. He spent the 2004 season with the High-A Salem Avalanche, recording a 5–6 record and 3.87 ERA in 86.0 innings of work. He spent the 2005 season in Double-A with the Corpus Christi Hooks, pitching to a 2.94 ERA in 50 appearances. He split the 2006 season between Corpus Christi and the Triple-A Round Rock Express, accumulating a stellar 2.04 ERA in 75.0 innings pitched. On October 15, 2016, Peguero elected free agency.

=== Arizona Diamondbacks ===
On November 20, 2006, Peguero signed a minor league contract with the Arizona Diamondbacks organization. He was assigned to the Triple-A Tucson Sidewinders to begin the year. On June 8, 2007, Peguero was called up to the major leagues for the first time when reliever Brandon Medders was optioned to Tucson. He made his major league debut that day in the ninth inning of a 10–3 loss to the Boston Red Sox, retiring the only three batters he faced, Jason Varitek, Coco Crisp, and Doug Mirabelli, in order. In 18 appearances for Arizona in 2007, he pitched to a 9.20 ERA. Peguero spent the majority of the 2008 season in Tucson, and pitched to a 4.82 ERA in 7 games for the major league club. On March 19, 2009, Peguero was released by Arizona.

=== Los Angeles Angels ===
On April 3, 2009, Peguero signed a minor league contract with the Los Angeles Angels of Anaheim. On May 19, 2009, Peguero was released by the Angels organization. He had appeared in 16 games for the Triple-A Salt Lake Bees, owning a 0–1 record with a 9.98 ERA with one save and 15 strikeouts.

=== Rojos del Águila de Veracruz ===
On June 4, 2009, Peguero signed with the Rojos del Águila de Veracruz of the Mexican League. He pitched to a 2.03 ERA in 28 appearances before being released on August 14, 2009.

=== Texas Rangers ===
On August 15, 2009, Peguero signed a minor league contract with the Texas Rangers. He finished the season with the Triple-A Oklahoma City RedHawks, recording a 3.86 ERA in 8 games. In 13 games for Oklahoma City in 2010, Peguero pitched to a 4.09 ERA.

=== Houston Astros (second stint) ===
On June 10, 2010, Peguero was traded to the Houston Astros in exchange for future considerations. He finished the year with the Double-A Corpus Christi Hooks, registering a stellar 1.70 ERA in 32 games.

=== Rojos del Águila de Veracruz (second stint) ===
On April 2, 2011, Peguero signed with the Rojos del Águila de Veracruz of the Mexican League. In 43 games, he pitched to an excellent 1.40 ERA with 47 strikeouts. In 2012, Peguero pitched to a 3.04 ERA in 50.1 innings of work.

=== Pericos de Puebla ===
On March 23, 2013, Peguero signed with the Pericos de Puebla of the Mexican League. He appeared in 51 games for the team in 2013, posting a 5–3 record and 4.67 ERA.

=== Vaqueros Laguna ===
On April 1, 2014, Peguero signed with the Vaqueros Laguna of the Mexican League. He struggled to a 7.36 ERA in 18 games before being released on May 13, 2014.

=== Piratas de Campeche ===
On May 17, 2014, Peguero signed with the Piratas de Campeche of the Mexican League. Peguero pitched to a 4.15 ERA in 5 appearances before he was released on May 27, 2014.

=== Winnipeg Goldeyes ===
On March 10, 2015, Peguero signed with the Winnipeg Goldeyes of the American Association of Independent Professional Baseball. In 49 games for Winnipeg, Peguero recorded a 5–4 record and 3.76 ERA with 67 strikeouts. he remained in Winnipeg for the 2016 season, where he pitched to a 2–4 record and 5.89 ERA in 18 games. He became a free agent after the season and did not play professionally in 2017.

=== Road Warriors ===
Peguero signed with the Road Warriors of the Atlantic League of Professional Baseball for the 2018 season. In 12 games for the club, Peguero registered a 3.48 ERA with 8 strikeouts.

=== York Revolution ===
On June 5, 2018, Peguero signed with the York Revolution of the Atlantic League. In 35 games for York, he pitched to a 2–4 record and 4.93 ERA in 49.1 innings of work. He became a free agent following the 2018 season.

=== San Rafael Pacifics ===
In 2019, Peguero signed with the San Rafael Pacifics of the Pacific Association. In 34 games for the club, Peguero pitched to a 6–4 record and 1.88 ERA, and earned Reliever of the Year honors after the season. He did not play in a game professionally in the 2020 season.

=== Gastonia Honey Hunters ===
On May 21, 2021, Peguero signed with the Gastonia Honey Hunters of the Atlantic League of Professional Baseball. He made 33 appearances (12 starts) for the team, compiling a 4–5 record and 6.64 ERA with 72 strikeouts over 80 innings pitched. Peguero became a free agent following the season.
