= Doug Slaten =

American baseball player (1980–2016)

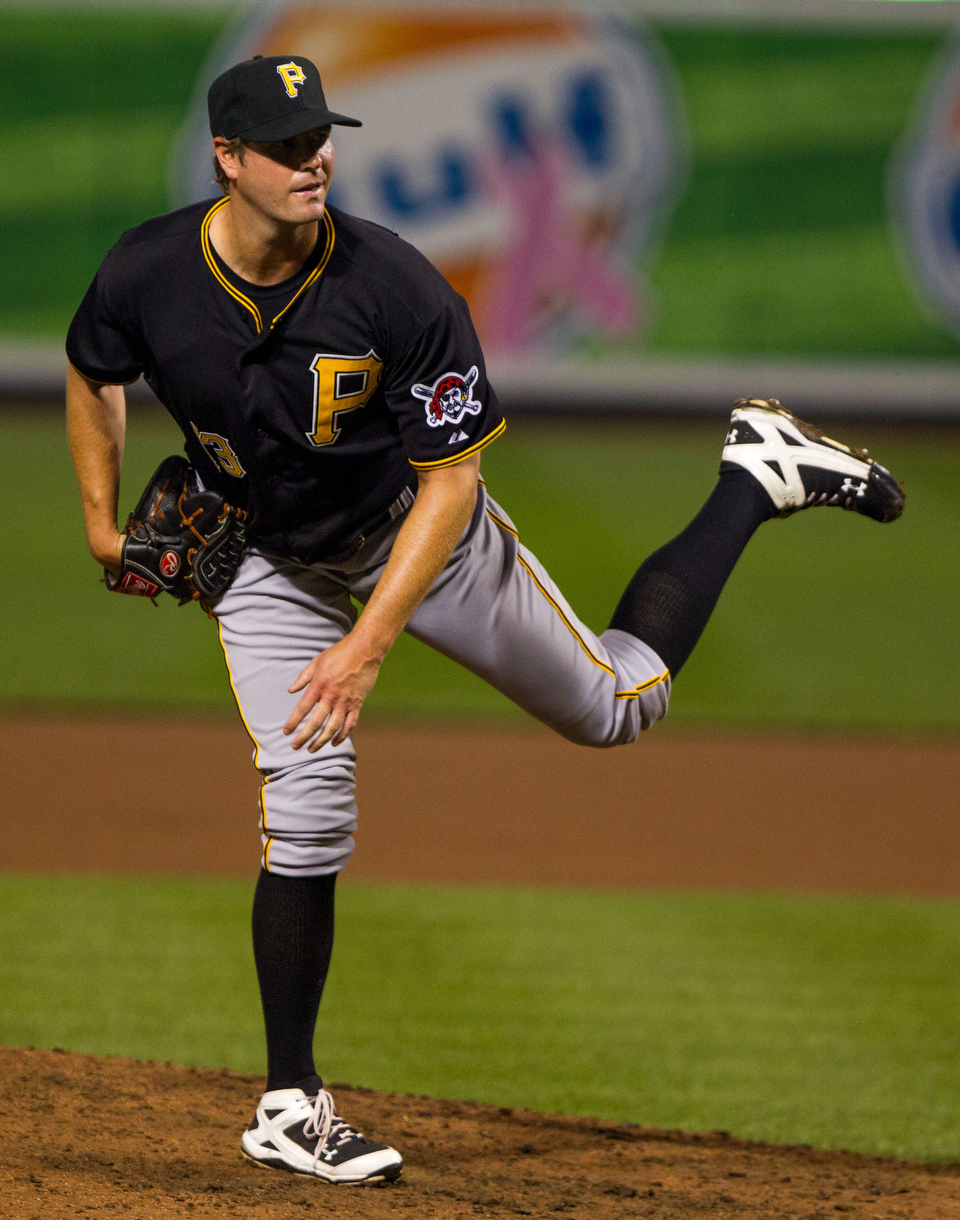
- Slaten with the Pittsburgh Pirates in 2012
- Pitcher
- Born: February 4, 1980; Venice, California, U.S.
- Died: October 4, 2016 (aged 36); Palm Beach Gardens, Florida, U.S.
- Batted: Left Threw: Left

MLB debut
- September 4, 2006, for the Arizona Diamondbacks

Last MLB appearance
- June 25, 2012, for the Pittsburgh Pirates

MLB statistics
- Win–loss record: 7–8
- Earned run average: 3.52
- Strikeouts: 110
- Stats at Baseball Reference

Teams
- Arizona Diamondbacks (2006–2009); Washington Nationals (2010–2011); Pittsburgh Pirates (2012)

Douglas Slaten (February 4, 1980 – October 4, 2016) was an American professional baseball pitcher. He played in Major League Baseball (MLB) from 2006 to 2012 for the Arizona Diamondbacks, Washington Nationals, and Pittsburgh Pirates.

== Amateur career ==
Slaten was born in 1980 in Venice, California, and began playing tee-ball at age five. He attended and played baseball for Venice High School, Glendale Community College, and Los Angeles Pierce College. He declined a scholarship offer to UCLA.

== Professional baseball career ==
Slaten was selected three times by Major League Baseball (MLB) organizations during MLB drafts. He was first selected in the 29th round of the 1998 MLB draft by the Baltimore Orioles, but he did not sign. The Orioles again selected Slaten during the 1999 MLB draft, in the 34th round, but again he did not sign. The Arizona Diamondbacks then selected Slaten in the 17th round of the 2000 MLB draft, and he signed on July 5, 2000.

=== Arizona Diamondbacks ===
After signing with the Diamondbacks, Slate pitched in nine games for the team's farm team in the Arizona League during the summer of 2000. He spent the 2001 season with the Lancaster JetHawks. He split the 2002 season between the South Bend Silver Hawks and Lancaster. In 2003, he played for the Lancaster JetHawks again. In 2004, he mostly pitched for South Bend, but also pitched for the Double-A El Paso Diablos. In 2005, he pitched for the Double-A Tennessee Smokies, and after the regular season pitched in the Arizona Fall League. In 2006, pitching for the Smokies, Slaten was named a Southern League Mid-Season All-Star. In 2006, Slaten went 4–4 with a 1.43 earned run average (ERA) with 80 strikeouts in the minor leagues.

Slaten made his major league debut on September 4, 2006, for Diamondbacks. He finished the season allowing zero earned runs in nine appearances. In 2007, Slaten appeared in 61 games for the Diamondbacks and recorded a 2.72 ERA, helping the team finish atop the National League West division. He pitched in three games of the 2007 National League Championship Series, allowing no earned runs in 1 1/3 innings. After posting a 4.30 ERA in 38 games in 2008, Slaten was optioned to Triple-A Tucson. He returned for the 2009 season in Arizona but pitched to a career-worst 7.11 ERA in 11 games, and was returned to the minor leagues.

=== Washington Nationals ===
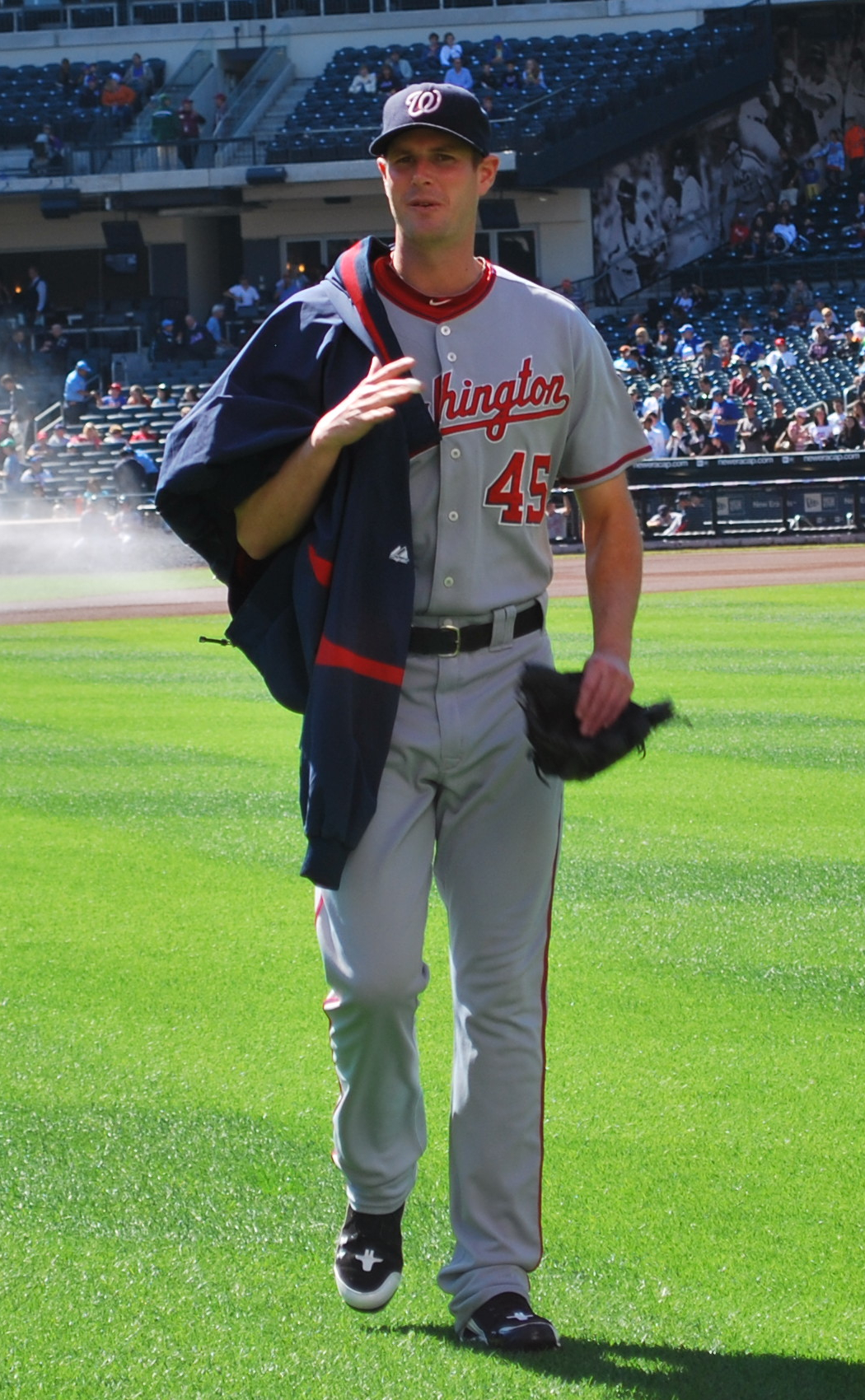
Slaten in 2010

Slaten was claimed off waivers by the Washington Nationals on November 4, 2009. In his first year with the Nationals, he had a career-high four wins and also a career-high in the number of innings pitched (40 2/3) and strikeouts (36), finishing the 2010 season with a 3.10 ERA. Slaten started off the 2011 season by not giving up a single run until his 15th appearance. He finished with a 4.41 ERA with 13 strikeouts in 16 1/3 innings and an 0–2 record. On December 12, 2011, the Nationals non-tendered Slaten, making him a free agent.

=== Pittsburgh Pirates ===
Slaten signed a minor league contract with the Pittsburgh Pirates on January 17, 2012. He was assigned to the Triple-A Indianapolis Indians. On April 29, 2012, in a game between Indianapolis and the Durham Bulls, Slaten pitched the final inning of a combined no-hitter. Justin Wilson pitched the first 7 1/3 innings, and Jose Diaz got the final two outs in the 8th inning. On May 28, Slaten was called up and pitched in 10 major-league games, until June 27 when he was designated for assignment to make room for minor-league waiver-claim Oscar Tejeda on the roster. In his 10 games with the Pirates, Slaten posted a 2.77 ERA and 6 strikeouts.

Overall, in 216 major-league pitching appearances (all in relief) in seven seasons, Slaten posted a 3.52 ERA while striking out 110 batters in 150 2/3 innings.

=== SK Wyverns ===
Slaten signed a deal with the SK Wyverns of the KBO League to be a starter, and then later cancelled his contract for personal reasons.

== Death ==
Slaten died in Palm Beach Gardens, Florida, on October 4, 2016; he was survived by a daughter. He was cremated, with his ashes subsequently buried in Kentucky.
