= Jeff DaVanon =

American baseball player (born 1973)

- Outfielder
- Born: December 8, 1973 (age 51); San Diego, California, U.S.
- Batted: Switch Threw: Right

MLB debut
- September 7, 1999, for the Anaheim Angels

Last MLB appearance
- September 30, 2007, for the Oakland Athletics

MLB statistics
- Batting average: .259
- Home runs: 33
- Runs batted in: 150
- Stats at Baseball Reference

Teams
- Anaheim Angels / Los Angeles Angels of Anaheim (1999, 2001–2005); Arizona Diamondbacks (2006–2007); Oakland Athletics (2007)

Jeffrey Graham DaVanon (born December 8, 1973) is an American former professional baseball outfielder. He played in Major League Baseball (MLB) for the Anaheim Angels / Los Angeles Angels of Anaheim, Arizona Diamondbacks, and Oakland Athletics.

== Professional career ==
DaVanon was drafted in the 26th round of the 1995 draft by the Oakland Athletics. He was traded to the Anaheim Angels as a minor-leaguer in 1999 and made his major league debut in September of that year.

DaVanon played in a career-high 123 games in 2003 for the Angels and, on June 4, became the fourth player in major league history to hit multiple home runs in three consecutive games. He hit for the cycle on August 25, 2004, becoming the fourth player in Angels' team history to accomplish this feat.

Prior to the 2006 season, he signed a contract with the Arizona Diamondbacks and appeared in 87 games for them. He batted .290 with 5 home runs and 35 RBI. His last game was on August 5 against the Houston Astros in which he injured a ligament in his ankle sliding into second base.

On August 4, 2007, the Diamondbacks released him. He was signed by the Oakland Athletics on August 10, 2007, and sent to Triple-A Sacramento. He had his contract purchased by the Athletics on August 17, 2007, when Mark Kotsay went on the disabled list. During his stint with the A's, he appeared in 26 games, batting .238, though not hitting any home runs and only getting 5 RBI.

He declared free agency on October 29, 2007. On December 21, 2007, the San Diego Padres signed him to a minor league contract with an invitation to spring training, but he did not make the team and was released on March 22, 2008. He later signed a minor league contract with the Chicago White Sox, playing for their Triple-A affiliate, the Charlotte Knights. He became a free agent at the end of the season.

== Personal life ==
He is the son of Jerry DaVanon, a former major league infielder and was born in San Diego, when his father played for the Padres.

== See also ==
- List of second-generation Major League Baseball players
- List of Major League Baseball players to hit for the cycle

Achievements
| Preceded by Mark Teixeira | Hitting for the cycle August 25, 2004 | Succeeded by Brad Wilkerson |
