= Brandon Medders =

American baseball player (born 1980)

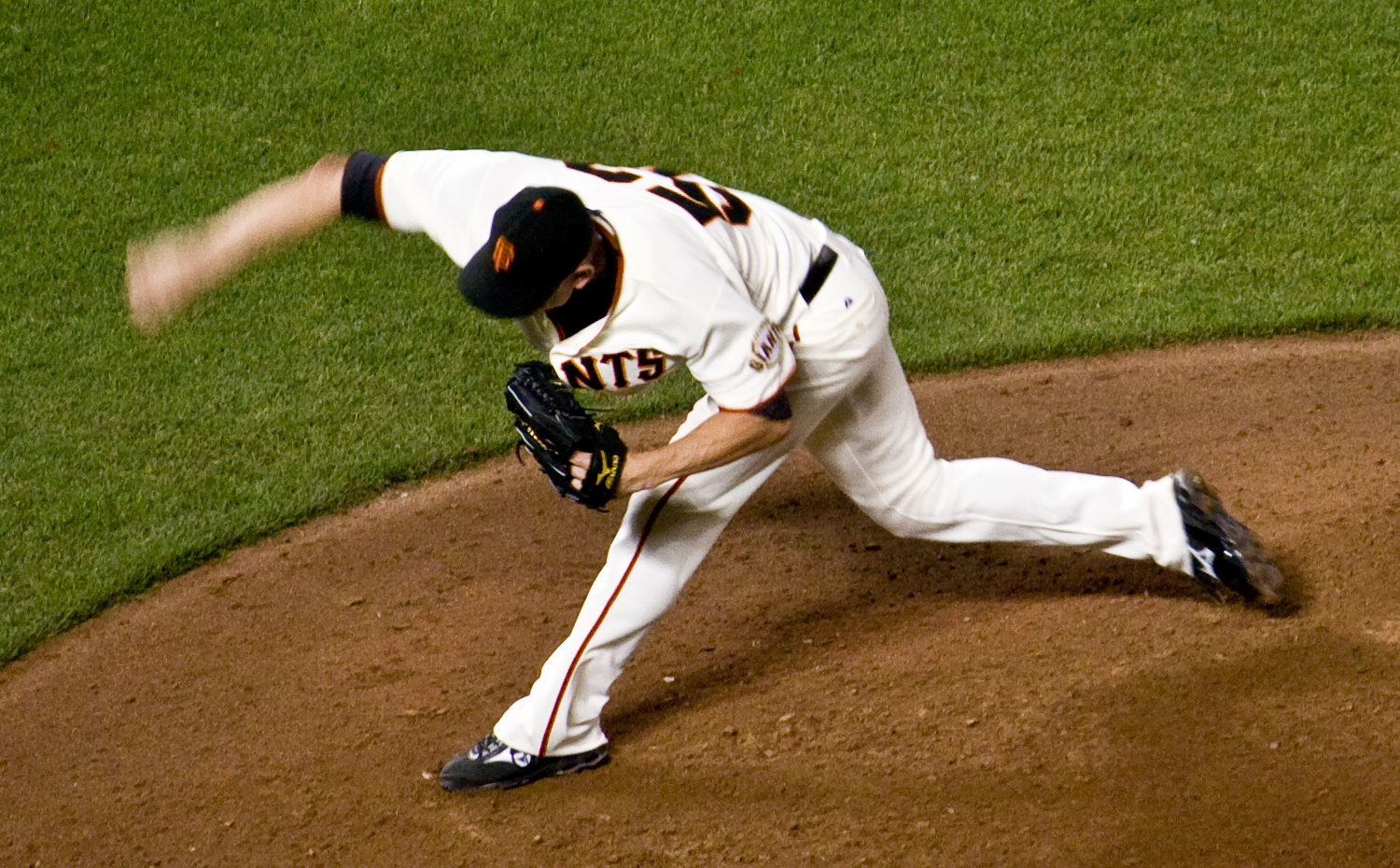
- Medders with the San Francisco Giants
- Relief pitcher
- Born: January 26, 1980 (age 46); Tuscaloosa, Alabama, U.S.
- Batted: Right Threw: Right

MLB debut
- June 20, 2005, for the Arizona Diamondbacks

Last MLB appearance
- May 19, 2010, for the San Francisco Giants

MLB statistics
- Win–loss record: 16–7
- Earned run average: 3.61
- Strikeouts: 175
- Stats at Baseball Reference

Teams
- Arizona Diamondbacks (2005–2008); San Francisco Giants (2009–2010)

Brandon Edward Medders (born January 26, 1980) is a former professional relief pitcher. He played for the Arizona Diamondbacks (2005–2008) and San Francisco Giants (2009–2010) of Major League Baseball (MLB). Medders threw a four-seam fastball, a curveball, a slider, a changeup, and a cutter.

A Tuscaloosa, Alabama, native, Medders won the Southeastern Conference (SEC) championship with Mississippi State University as a junior in 2001, then signed with the Diamondbacks, the third MLB team in the last four years to draft him. He spent four seasons in the minor leagues, pitched with Arizona on three separate stints in 2005, then posted a 3.64 earned run average (ERA) in 60 games for them in 2006. After pitching inconsistently in 2007, he was outrighted off of Arizona's 40-man roster in 2008, becoming a free agent following the season.

A non-roster invitee to the Giants' spring training in 2009, Medders made the team's roster. In 61 games, he had a 3.01 ERA. After posting a 7.20 ERA in 2010, Medders was outrighted off the 40-man roster in June, once again becoming a free agent after the season.

== Early life ==
Brandon Edward Medders was born on January 26, 1980, in Tuscaloosa, Alabama. He attended Tuscaloosa's Hillcrest High School, graduating in 1998. The Tampa Bay Devil Rays selected him in the 37th round of the 1998 Major League Baseball (MLB) draft, but he chose to attend Tuscaloosa's Shelton State Community College. He was then selected by the Kansas City Royals in the 18th round of the 1999 MLB draft, but he decided to transfer to Mississippi State University. As a junior in 2001, he won six games and recorded six saves. Mississippi State won its first Southeastern Conference (SEC) championship since 1987, and Medders was named to the SEC All-Tournament Team. In his two years at Mississippi State, he had a 7–4 record and a 3.21 earned run average (ERA). He was then drafted by the Arizona Diamondbacks in the eighth round of the 2001 MLB draft, this time choosing to sign.

== Arizona Diamondbacks ==
=== 2001–2004 (minors) ===
Medders made his professional debut in 2001 with the Class A advanced Lancaster JetHawks of the California League. In 31 games, he had a 1–2 record, a 1.32 ERA, 53 strikeouts, 15 walks, and 26 hits allowed in 41 innings pitched. He also registered three saves. Medders remained with Lancaster in 2002, serving as a starting pitcher for part of the year and also as the team's closer. In 43 games (12 starts), he had a 4–8 record, a 5.38 ERA, 104 strikeouts, 36 walks, and 111 hits allowed in 98 2/3 innings. His 15 saves ranked fourth in the California League, behind Jared Hoerman's 29, Mike Frick's 23, and Frank Bludau's 22. This was the only year in which Medders made any starts.

In 2003, Medders pitched for the Class AA El Paso Diablos of the Texas League. Appearing in 56 games, he had a 5–3 record, seven saves, a 4.41 ERA, 72 strikeouts, 26 walks, and 65 hits allowed in 69 1/3 innings pitched. He pitched for the Class AAA Tucson Sidewinders of the Pacific Coast League (PCL) in 2004. In 11 games, he had no record, a 4.26 ERA, 17 strikeouts, four walks, and 15 hits allowed in 12 2/3 innings pitched. He tore a labrum in his right shoulder during the year, requiring surgery to repair the injury.

=== 2005–2006 ===
Medders began 2005 with Tucson. On June 19, the Diamondbacks purchased his contract after Russ Ortiz was injured and Matt Herges was designated for assignment. He made his MLB debut the next day, pitching a scoreless eighth inning in an 8–3 loss to the San Francisco Giants. He was scored upon in one of six outings, posting a 3.38 ERA before being demoted to Tucson on July 2. Five days later, he was recalled by Arizona after Shawn Estes was injured. On July 18, he pitched a scoreless top of the 11th inning and earned his first MLB win when Arizona scored in the bottom of the inning to defeat the Florida Marlins 8–7. He pitched scoreless ball in four appearances on his second stint before getting sent to Tucson on August 2 so the Diamondbacks could add left-hander Buddy Groom to the roster. Recalled a third time on August 19 after Brian Bruney was sent down, Medders remained with Arizona for the rest of the season. In 36 games for Tucson, he had a 3–2 record, eight saves, a 2.48 ERA, 44 strikeouts, 18 walks, and 31 hits allowed in 36 1/3 innings. With Arizona in 27 games, he went 4–1 with a 1.78 ERA, 31 strikeouts, 11 walks, and 21 hits allowed in 30 1/3 innings.

In 2006, Medders suffered a muscle group strain that caused him to miss spring training. He started the year rehabbing at Tucson before getting called up by the Diamondbacks on April 19. On August 15, he had his longest outing of the year in the longest game in Colorado Rockies history, pitching a scoreless 16th-through-18th innings, striking out a season-high four batters, and earning the win in Arizona's 18-inning, 2–1 victory. He had his lowest ERA for the team in the month of May, posting a figure of 0.61 in 11 games. From June 3 through 6, he gave up nine runs in three games, but only one was earned; the rest were the result of three Diamondback errors. In 60 games, he had a 5–3 record, a 3.64 ERA, 47 strikeouts, 28 walks, and 76 hits in 71 2/3 innings.

=== 2007–2008 ===
Medders started 2007 inconsistently. He was optioned to Tucson on June 8 after allowing eight home runs in 22 1/3 innings. In 35 games with Tucson, he had a 5–3 record, five saves, a 4.69 ERA, 38 strikeouts, 24 walks, and 55 hits allowed in 48 innings. Recalled when rosters expanded, Medders pitched seven more innings for the Diamondbacks, allowing just one more home run. In 30 games for Arizona, he had a 1–2 record, a 4.30 ERA, 23 strikeouts, 16 walks, and 30 hits allowed in 29 1/3 innings. He did not pitch in the playoffs for the Diamondbacks, who won the National League (NL) West and swept the Chicago Cubs in the 2007 National League Division Series before getting swept by the Rockies in the 2007 National League Championship Series.

After beginning 2008 with the Diamondbacks, Medders was surprised to be designated for assignment on May 22 and outrighted to Tucson on May 30. However, the Diamondbacks needed his roster spot for Doug Davis, who was returning from the disabled list. In 18 games with Arizona, he had a 1–0 record, a 4.58 ERA, eight strikeouts, 11 walks, and 17 hits allowed in 19 2/3 innings. With Tucson in 26 games, Medders had a 1–2 record, a 7.45 ERA, 33 strikeouts, 24 walks, and 45 hits allowed in 38 2/3 innings. No longer on Arizona's 40-man roster, he was not recalled in September and became a free agent at the end of the season.

== San Francisco Giants ==
=== 2009 ===
On January 9, 2009, Medders signed a minor league contract with the Giants with an invitation to spring training. Making the Opening Day roster, he spent the whole season with the club. From May 10 through June 9, he allowed just two runs (neither earned) in 13 innings over a 14-game span. In the first game of a doubleheader against the Washington Nationals on June 4, Medders relieved Randy Johnson and pitched a scoreless seventh, preserving the lead in the 300th win of Johnson's career. Against Arizona on August 26, Medders picked up the only save of his MLB career, pitching a flawless ninth inning to preserve a 4–3 victory. He described what it was like to pitch in that game:

I got up with two outs in the eighth inning. That's plenty of time to get ready. It was like a roller coaster if I was going in or not. I saw [Sergio] Romo run down to the pen, but I guess he couldn't get ready in time. It was a good opportunity for me. Saves don't mean much to me. It was just a matter of getting three outs.

— Brandon Medders, ESPN: August 26, 2009

In 61 games, he had a 5–1 record, a 3.01 ERA, 58 strikeouts, 32 walks, and 63 hits allowed in 68 2/3 innings. Among Giants relievers, only Brian Wilson threw more innings (72 1/3) than Medders.

=== 2010 ===
Medders avoided arbitration and agreed to a one-year $820,000 contract with the Giants on January 16, 2010. On May 21, he was placed on the disabled list. While on a rehab assignment with the PCL's Fresno Grizzlies, he was outrighted to Fresno on June 4 to make room on the Giants' 40-man roster for Pat Burrell. In 14 games for San Francisco, he had no record, a 7.20 ERA, eight strikeouts, six walks, and 26 hits allowed in 15 innings. He pitched in 22 games for Fresno, earning a 2–1 record, one save, a 5.46 ERA, 26 strikeouts, 10 walks, and 28 hits allowed in 28 innings. No longer on San Francisco's 40-man roster, he was not recalled in September, and he was not on the postseason roster when the Giants defeated the Texas Rangers in the 2010 World Series. After the season, he became a free agent.

== Career statistics and pitching style ==
In 210 games, Medders had a 16–7 record, a 3.61 ERA, 175 strikeouts, 104 walks, and 233 hits allowed in 234 2/3 innings. He threw a four-seam fastball, cut fastball (cutter), a curveball, a slider, and a changeup. The four-seam fastball averaged 90 miles per hour (140 km/h), while the cutter averaged 89 miles per hour (143 km/h). After not throwing the cutter more than 10% of the time with the Diamondbacks, Medders threw it over 30% of the time with the Giants. His curveball was his slowest pitch, averaging 72.5 miles per hour (116.7 km/h); he threw it 25% of the time. The slider, which averaged 83.9 miles per hour (135.0 km/h), was his choice 12.6% of the time. He rarely threw the changeup, which was his choice 3.3% of the time; it averaged 80.9 miles per hour (130.2 km/h).

== Personal life ==
Medders married fellow Tuscaloosa native Meredith Sims McGraw on September 12, 2002, in Tuscaloosa. The couple has one child, daughter Berkley. Former Diamondback teammate Bruney is one of his best friends.
