= Tony Peña (pitcher) =

Dominican baseball player (born 1982)

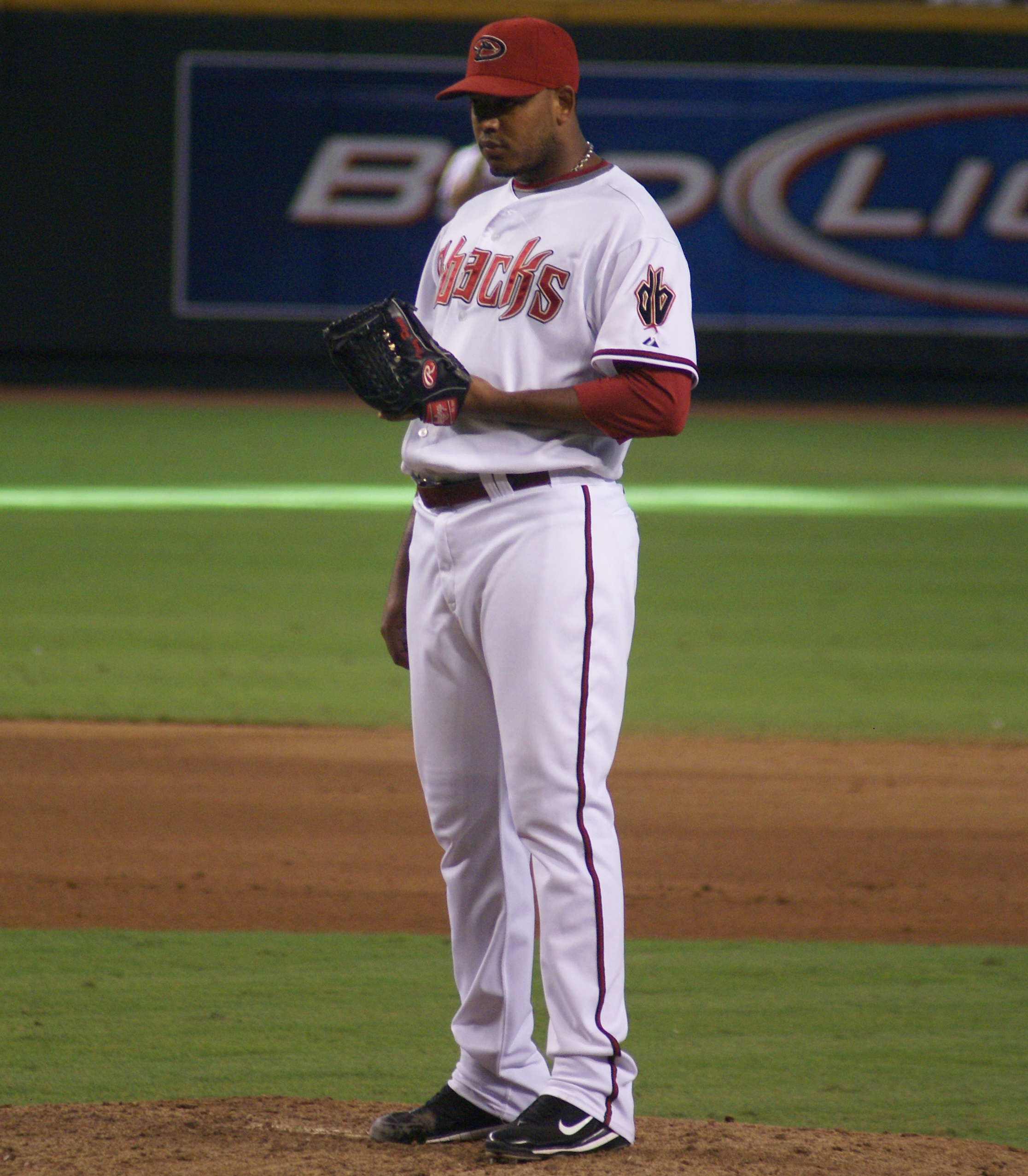
- Peña with the Arizona Diamondbacks in 2008
- Relief pitcher
- Born: January 9, 1982 (age 44); Santo Domingo, Dominican Republic
- Batted: Right Threw: Right

Professional debut
- MLB: July 18, 2006, for the Arizona Diamondbacks
- CPBL: September 5, 2014, for the Chinatrust Brothers

Last appearance
- MLB: May 27, 2011, for the Chicago White Sox
- CPBL: October 5, 2014, for the Chinatrust Brothers

MLB statistics
- Win–loss record: 23–19
- Earned run average: 4.43
- Strikeouts: 264

CPBL statistics
- Win–loss record: 0-0
- Earned run average: 3.09
- Strikeouts: 9
- Stats at Baseball Reference

Teams
- Arizona Diamondbacks (2006–2009); Chicago White Sox (2009–2011); Chinatrust Brothers (2014)

Ramon Antonio Peña (born January 9, 1982), is a Dominican former professional baseball pitcher. He played in Major League Baseball (MLB) with the Arizona Diamondbacks and Chicago White Sox, and in the Chinese Professional Baseball League (CPBL) for the Chinatrust Brothers

He throws a 4-seam and 2-seam fastball, slider, and a changeup. Pena's slider is considered to have above average break, and his 4-seam fastball is better than his stats would indicate, judging by velocity and control.

== Professional career ==
=== Arizona Diamondbacks ===
Peña was signed by the Arizona Diamondbacks as an undrafted free agent on June 13, 2002. Peña played under the identity of his nephew Adriano Rosario who was three years younger in his first two seasons of Double-A baseball.

He made his MLB debut on July 18, 2006. As a rookie, he went 3–4 with a 5.58 ERA over 30 2/3 innings. He struck out 21, while walking eight and giving up six home runs. After boasting a 1.04 ERA in the month of July, Peña struggled in August with a 6.59 ERA and September with a 9.82 ERA. In the last month of the season, he posted two scoreless outings over six appearances.

Peña made the Major League roster out of spring training for the first time in his career in 2007. He made his season debut on April 3 against the Colorado Rockies, tossing two scoreless innings of relief. He earned his first win on April 18, pitching a perfect inning of relief. He finished the month of May going 2–1 with a 1.88 ERA with three holds. Peña picked up his first save of the season on May 8 against the Philadelphia Phillies, second of career. He pitched 12 scoreless innings of relief from June 5 to 28, the longest streak of the season by a D-backs reliever. He ranks fourth in franchise history with 32 career holds and is second on the single-season franchise record list with 30 holds, 5 behind Brandon Lyon. Peña picked up his first Major League hit on May 25 against the Houston Astros, a RBI single to right field.

His 23 holds led the team and tied for fourth in the National League in 2008. His 55 career holds are second only to Brandon Lyon's 62 in team history. He recorded 5 consecutive holds for the second time in his career from April 21 to 30. Peña earned his first save of the season on May 16 against the Detroit Tigers.

=== Chicago White Sox ===
On July 7, 2009, Peña was traded to the Chicago White Sox in exchange for minor leaguer Brandon Allen. He went 1–2 with the Sox in 2009 and a combined 6–5 with two saves, 55 strikeouts and a 3.99 ERA in 72 games.

On May 29, 2011, Peña was placed on the 15-day disabled list with right elbow tendinitis retroactive to May 28. He would later be transferred to the 60-day disabled list, where he spent the rest of the season. Peña was released by the White Sox on October 14.

=== Los Angeles Angels ===
On August 12, 2012, Peña signed a minor league contract with the Los Angeles Angels. He was released on May 30, 2013.

=== Sultanes de Monterrey ===
On April 1, 2014, Peña signed with the Sultanes de Monterrey of the Mexican League. In 14 games for Monterrey, he logged a 2-1 record and 8.56 ERA with 21 strikeouts across 13 2/3 innings pitched. Peña was released by the Sultanes on April 27.

=== Chinatrust Brothers ===
On August 31, 2014, Peña signed with the Chinatrust Brothers of the Chinese Professional Baseball League. He became a free agent following the season.

=== York Revolution ===
On July 1, 2015, Peña signed with the York Revolution of the Atlantic League of Professional Baseball. In 36 appearances for York, he posted a 2-2 record and 2.75 ERA with 31 strikeouts across 39 1/3 innings pitched. Peña became a free agent following the season.

On February 26, 2016, Peña re-signed a new contract with the Revolution. He made 28 appearances (23 starts) for the team, compiling a 7-10 record and 5.58 ERA with 82 strikeouts across 138 2/3 innings of work. Peña became a free agent following the season.
