= Augie Ojeda =

American baseball player (born 1974)

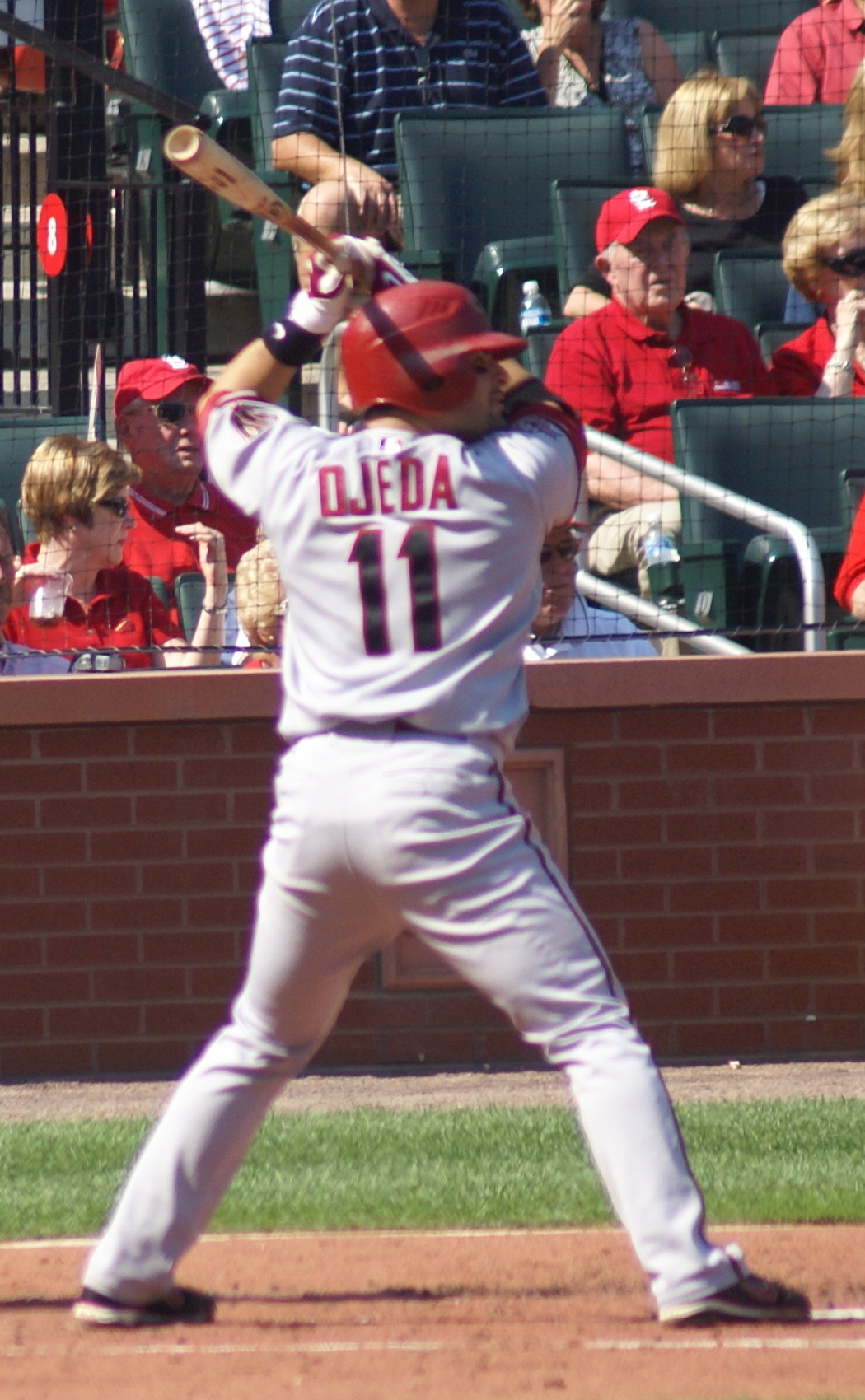
- Ojeda with the Arizona Diamondbacks in 2008
- Infielder
- Born: December 20, 1974 (age 51); Los Angeles, California, U.S.
- Batted: Switch Threw: Right

MLB debut
- June 4, 2000, for the Chicago Cubs

Last MLB appearance
- October 3, 2010, for the Arizona Diamondbacks

MLB statistics
- Batting average: .234
- Home runs: 7
- Runs batted in: 81
- Stats at Baseball Reference

Teams
- Chicago Cubs (2000–2003); Minnesota Twins (2004); Arizona Diamondbacks (2007–2010)
Medals
Men's baseball
Representing United States
Olympic Games
| Bronze medal – third place | 1996 Atlanta | Team |

Octavio Augie Ojeda (born December 20, 1974) is an American former professional baseball infielder. He played in Major League Baseball (MLB) for the Chicago Cubs, Minnesota Twins, and Arizona Diamondbacks.

== Amateur career ==
A native of Los Angeles, California, Ojeda attended Cypress College and the University of Tennessee. In 1994, he played collegiate summer baseball with the Brewster Whitecaps of the Cape Cod Baseball League.

== Professional career ==
=== Baltimore Orioles ===
Ojeda was drafted in the 13th round of the 1996 MLB draft by the Baltimore Orioles, but he did not play for the Orioles organization until 1997 due to his participation in the 1996 Summer Olympics. He shot through the Orioles system in 1997, playing for the Single-A Frederick Keys, Double-A Bowie Baysox and Triple-A Rochester Red Wings. In total, he had a .344 batting average and also showed good plate discipline with 57 walks compared to only 39 strikeouts. In 1998, Ojeda played mostly for Double-A Bowie and his batting average slumped to .264, though he again showed good plate discipline, with 39 walks and 31 strikeouts. In 1999, he played 134 games for Bowie and 1 game for Rochester. He batted .267 and had a career-high 10 home runs and 60 RBIs. On December 14, 1999, he was traded to the Chicago Cubs for Richard Negrette.

=== Chicago Cubs ===
Ojeda batted .280 in 113 games for Triple-A Iowa Cubs in 2000. He spent most of June in the majors, making his major league debut on June 4 and was also called up after rosters expanded in September, overall in the majors, Ojeda batted .221. He spent all of the 2001 season in the majors, where he only batted .201 in 144 at bats. He began 2002 in the majors, but was sent down in June after only batting .186. He again found success in Triple-A, batting .299 and again walking more than he struck out. In 2003, Ojeda batted .251 in Triple-A and spent August and September with Chicago. On November 24, 2003, he was claimed off waivers by the Minnesota Twins.

=== Minnesota Twins ===
The Twins released Ojeda on December 21, but re-signed him two days later. He spent the next two seasons with the Twins organization. In Triple-A in 2004, he batted just .245, but hit .339 in the majors from August to the end of the season. 2005 was the first time in five seasons he did not appear in the majors; he struggled in Triple-A with a .224 batting average. He became a free agent after the season.

=== Chicago Cubs ===
On January 3, 2006, Ojeda signed with the Cubs again. He was the starting shortstop for Iowa, but he hit just .248. He made his first pitching appearance in 2006, pitching 1 inning, giving up 1 hit and 1 walk, but not allowing a run. He was granted free agency at the end of the season.

=== Arizona Diamondbacks ===
On February 5, 2007, he signed with the Arizona Diamondbacks and was a non-roster invitee for Spring Training, but started the season with Triple-A Tucson for his first season in Arizona's organization. Ojeda hit .323 with Tucson to earn a major league call up in June, where he spent the rest of the season. He batted .274 in the majors and also pitched 1 inning. On August 14, D-Backs starter Byung-hyun Kim got only 1 out with 17 pitches, and gave up 4 runs. With the bullpen weary, Ojeda had to make an emergency appearance on the mound. He pitched a perfect 8th inning becoming only the 3rd D-Backs position player to ever pitch in a game. Ojeda batted .286 in 21 postseason at-bats for the D-Backs in the NLDS and NLCS, as the Rockies beat them in the NLCS. He started 2008 on the major league squad as a utility infielder.

=== Return to the Cubs ===
On January 27, 2011, Ojeda signed with the Cubs once again this time as a non-roster invitee to Spring Training. He played 18 games for the Iowa Cubs, but after hitting just .200, he was released on July 9.

== Personal life ==
He currently resides in Phoenix, Arizona
