= Micah Owings =

American baseball player (born 1982)

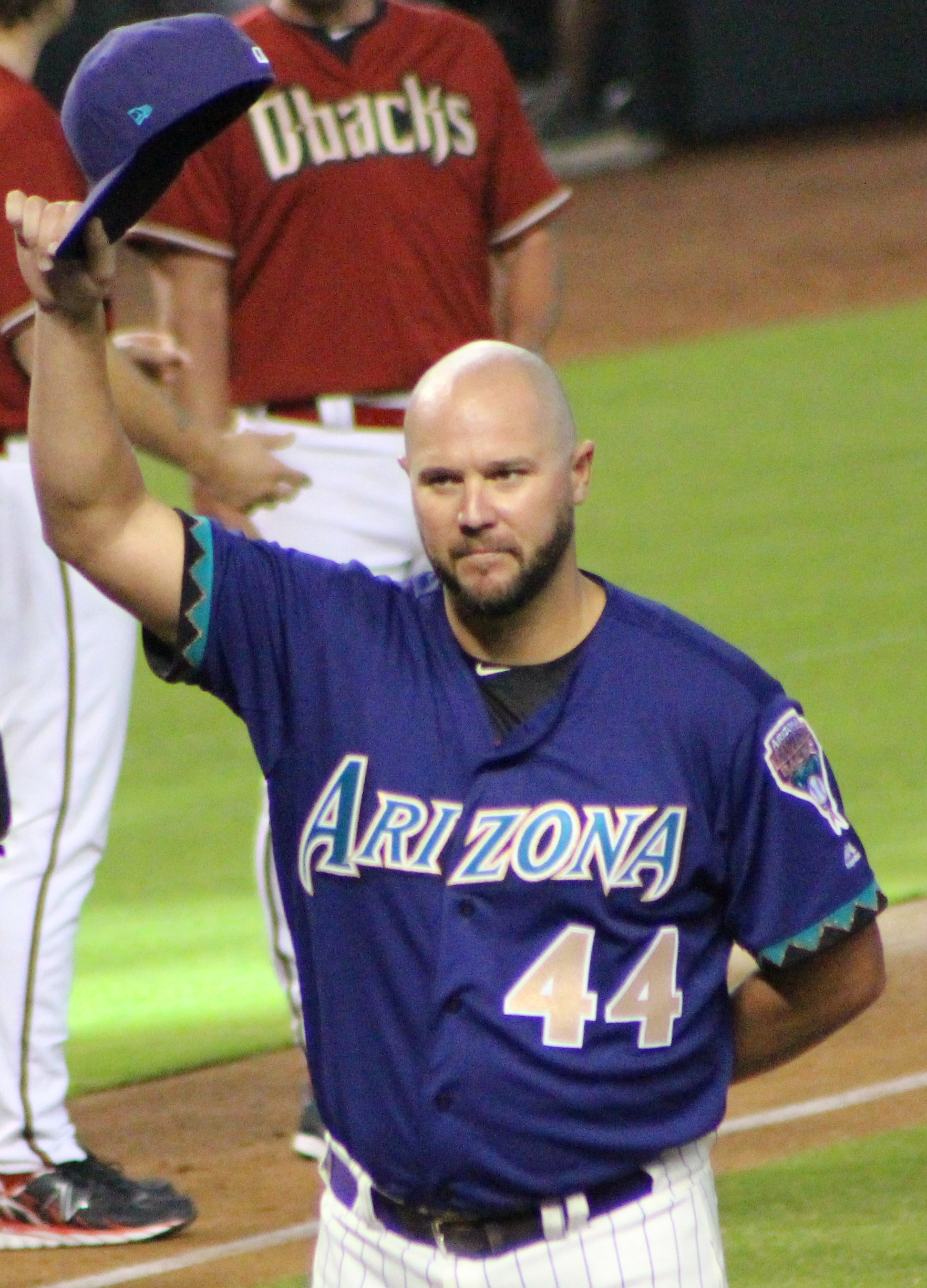
- Owings at the 2017 Arizona Diamondbacks Alumni Game
- Pitcher / Pinch hitter
- Born: September 28, 1982 (age 43); Gainesville, Georgia, U.S.
- Batted: Right Threw: Right

MLB debut
- April 6, 2007, for the Arizona Diamondbacks

Last MLB appearance
- April 25, 2012, for the San Diego Padres

MLB statistics
- Win–loss record: 32–33
- Earned run average: 4.86
- Strikeouts: 347
- Batting average: .283
- Home runs: 9
- Runs batted in: 35
- Stats at Baseball Reference

Teams
- Arizona Diamondbacks (2007–2008); Cincinnati Reds (2008–2010); Arizona Diamondbacks (2011); San Diego Padres (2012)

Career highlights and awards
- Silver Slugger Award (2007)
Medals
Men's baseball
Representing United States
Pan American Games
Silver medal – second place	2003 Santo Domingo	Team competition

Micah Burton Owings (born September 28, 1982) is an American former professional baseball player who played in Major League Baseball (MLB) for the Arizona Diamondbacks, Cincinnati Reds and San Diego Padres between 2007 and 2012. During his career, Owings was used as a pitcher and an occasional pinch-hitter; he also played outfield in the minor leagues. While playing for the Diamondbacks in 2007, he was honored with a Silver Slugger Award as the top-hitting pitcher.

Owings played college baseball with the Georgia Tech Yellow Jackets before transferring to Tulane, where he played in the College World Series. He was drafted in the third round of the 2005 MLB draft by Arizona, making his major league debut with the Diamondbacks in 2007. He played two seasons in Arizona before he was traded to the Cincinnati Reds. He spent two seasons with the Reds, followed by a return to Arizona for a one-year stint. Owings joined the San Diego Padres in 2012, signed a minor league contract with Washington in 2013, was later released and then signed with the Milwaukee Brewers.

== Early life and career ==
Owings holds Georgia's high school home run record with 69, fourth in the nation only to Drew Henson, Jeff Clement, and James Peterson. As a sophomore, he hit .630 with 21 homers; as a senior he hit .448 with 25 home runs while going 12–1 on the mound with a 1.03 ERA, 121 strikeouts, and 3 walks in 75 innings. Owings played his freshman and sophomore seasons at Forsyth Central High School in Cumming and transferred to Gainesville High School as a junior.

Owings played college baseball at Georgia Tech in 2003 and 2004 before transferring to Tulane University in New Orleans. After the 2004 season, he played collegiate summer baseball with the Bourne Braves of the Cape Cod Baseball League. In the 2005 season, Owings was named to the All-Tournament Team at the Conference USA Tournament. Tulane held a number one national ranking for most of the season and reached the College World Series.

He was selected by the Colorado Rockies in the 2nd round (50th overall) in the 2002 Major League Baseball draft, but did not sign with them. He was selected again in 2004 in the 19th round (576th overall) by the Chicago Cubs and again chose not to sign. In 2005, he was selected in the third round by the Arizona Diamondbacks (83rd overall).

After signing with Arizona, he was assigned to the Single-A Lancaster JetHawks. He pitched in 16 games out of the bullpen, going 1–1 with a 2.45 ERA. In 2006, he played in Double-A and Triple-A for the Tennessee Smokies and the Tucson Sidewinders, respectively. He made 12 starts for the Smokies and went 6–2 with a 2.88 ERA. His stats in Triple-A were impressive, in which he went 10–0 with a respectable 3.75 ERA in 15 starts.

== Major league career ==
=== Arizona Diamondbacks (2007–2008) ===
Owings was a long shot to make the Diamondbacks' Opening Day roster in 2007, but was ultimately named the fifth starter over Enrique González, Dana Eveland, Dustin Nippert, and Yusmeiro Petit. Owings made his major league debut on April 6, 2007, against the Washington Nationals. He pitched five shutout innings, allowing only one hit, and striking out six. Originally brought up to fill a starter spot while Randy Johnson recovered from back surgery, management was very impressed by his performances. On July 26, Owings hit his first Major League home run against Byung-hyun Kim of the Florida Marlins.

Owings was having an uneventful season in the major leagues in 2007 until he faced the Atlanta Braves on August 18, 2007. He pitched 7.0 innings, allowing three hits and three earned runs, striking out seven. His batting performance made it a career night. Owings went 4 for 5, including two home runs, scoring four times with six RBI. He is the first pitcher with four hits, four runs and six RBI in the same game. The last pitcher in the Major Leagues to record four hits and four runs was Danny Jackson in 1988. Owings' 11 total bases are the most by a pitcher in the last 50 seasons. The last Arizona player to have four hits, two homers, four runs and six RBI was Shea Hillenbrand in 2003. He was the first Diamondbacks pitcher to have 2 home runs in one game. The Diamondbacks would later win, 12–6.

Following two particularly poor outings in early September 2007, Owings pitched his first Major League shutout on September 18, 2007, allowing only two hits against the San Francisco Giants.

Later in 2007, on September 27, Owings made an emergency start in place of Brandon Webb and pitched 6 1/3 innings of shutout ball, while going 4-for-4 at the plate with three doubles and three RBI. He became the first pitcher since Whitey Ford to have two 4-hit games in one season. He won a Silver Slugger Award that season after hitting .333 with four homers and 15 RBI in 60 at-bats. His batting average of .333 ranked fourth best for pitchers since 1973, the beginning of the designated hitter era (in the American League).

On December 5, 2007, the Arizona Republic newspaper reported that the Diamondbacks were considering playing Owings at first base during the days that he was not pitching, in an effort to get his potent bat into the lineup on a more regular basis.

On April 30, 2008, Owings had a pinch-hit 2-run home run against the Houston Astros. It was the first pinch homer by a pitcher in the majors in more than four years. Brooks Kieschnick of the Milwaukee Brewers had last done it against Matt Mantei of the Arizona Diamondbacks on April 22, 2004.

On June 4, 2008, manager Bob Melvin inserted Owings 8th in the batting order at Milwaukee. The Diamondbacks lost 10–1 to Milwaukee.

=== Cincinnati Reds (2009–2010) ===
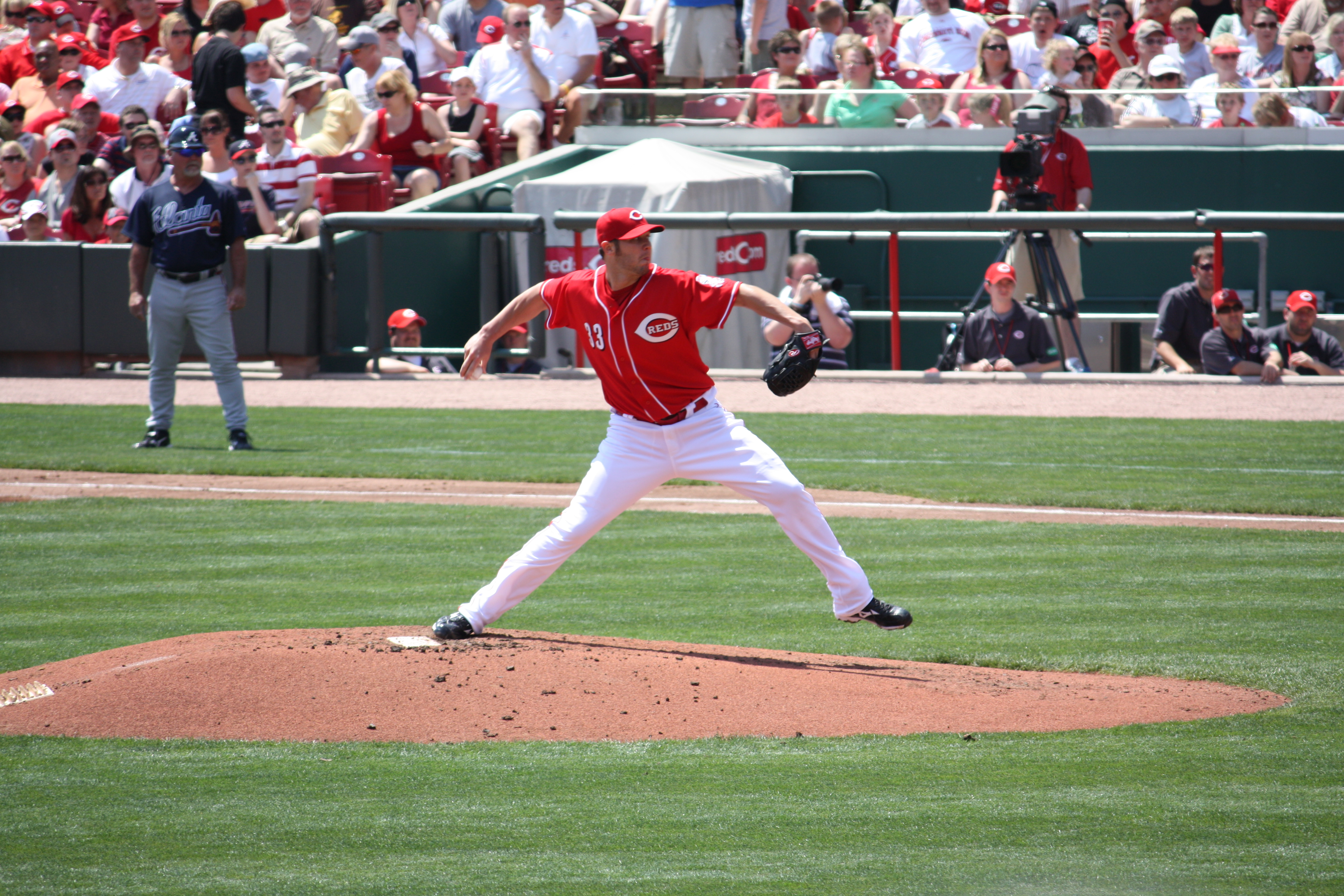
Owings with the Reds in 2009.

On August 11, 2008, the Cincinnati Reds traded left fielder Adam Dunn to the Arizona Diamondbacks for Dallas Buck and two players to be named, who were later revealed as Wilkin Castillo on August 14 and Owings on September 12.

Owings batted .259 with the Reds in 2009 with three homers and 10 RBI in 54 at-bats.

On Wednesday, July 21, 2010, the Reds optioned Owings to the Triple-A Louisville Bats. On Tuesday, August 17, 2010, the Reds designated Owings for assignment to make room on the 40-man roster for Yasmani Grandal, the Reds' 2010 first-round draft pick, whom they signed to a Major League contract. Reds GM Walt Jocketty stated that Owings had requested a trade "to another club that would have a better future for him". On August 26, 2010, the Reds announced that Owings had cleared waivers and had accepted an outright assignment to the Triple-A Louisville Bats. He elected free agency after the season on October 6.

=== Arizona Diamondbacks (2011) ===
On January 24, 2011, Owings signed a minor league contract with the Arizona Diamondbacks and he would try out at first base, along with his normal starting pitcher role. Micah Owings was recalled from the Triple-A Reno Aces May 21, 2011, to take the roster spot opened by the release of Russell Branyan. In 2011, Owings had an 8–0 record. The eighth victory came on an outing on September 27 where Owings gave up 5 runs in the 10th, but the Diamondbacks rallied for 6 in the bottom half of the frame. On December 12, 2011, Owings was non-tendered by the Diamondbacks, making him a free agent.

=== San Diego Padres (2012) ===
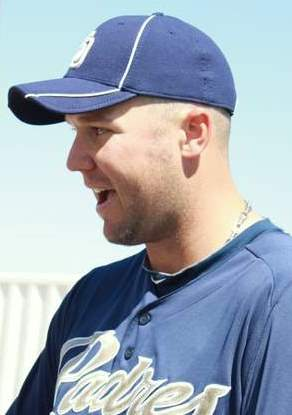
Owings with the Padres in 2012

On February 2, 2012, Owings signed a one-year $1 million contract with the San Diego Padres. He started the season as a relief pitcher, but he was on the disabled list since April 26 with a right forearm strain. After not expecting to pitch again that season, Owings planned to play first base, left field, and designated hitter in Triple-A in Tucson. He did not want to give up pitching, and intended to become a "position player/pitcher". At the time, he had a career batting average of .283 with 14 doubles, two triples, nine homers and 35 RBI in 203 at-bats. He also had a .313 on-base percentage and a .507 slugging percentage. However, those plans were put on hold after he underwent season-ending surgery on his right elbow.

On October 23, Owings was released by the Padres. He would've been a non-tender candidate, being in his third year of arbitration eligibility.

=== Washington Nationals (2013) ===
On February 6, 2013, Owings signed a minor league contract with the Washington Nationals that included an invitation to Major League spring training. The Nationals announcement listed him as a first baseman, although he ended up being used exclusively as an outfielder and DH. In 213 plate appearances with Triple-A Syracuse Chiefs, Owings hit eight home runs and posted a .785 OPS. He was released on June 30.

=== Milwaukee Brewers (2013) ===
On July 13, 2013, the Milwaukee Brewers signed Owings to a minor-league contract in which he was expected to play both the outfield and pitch. He elected free agency on November 4, 2013.

=== Miami Marlins (2014) ===
On April 5, 2014, Owings signed a minor league deal with the Miami Marlins. He became a free agent after the 2014 season.

=== York Revolution (2016) ===
On April 21, 2016, Owings signed with the York Revolution of the Atlantic League of Professional Baseball. In 23 appearances (19 starts) for the Revolution, he posted a 7–6 record and 4.30 ERA with 81 strikeouts across 106 2/3 innings pitched. Owings became a free agent following the season.

=== Seattle Mariners (2016) ===
On October 24, 2016, Owings signed with the Seattle Mariners, with an invite to spring training. He elected free agency on November 6, 2017. He spent the remainder of 2017 working in the front office for the Mariners, scouting and player development.

=== Coaching career ===
Currently, Owings works in the Cincinnati Reds organization as a bench coach for the Billings Mustangs of the Pioneer League.

== See also ==
- Arizona Diamondbacks award winners and league leaders
