= 2008 San Diego Padres season =

2008 San Diego Padres
- League: National League
- Division: West
- Ballpark: Petco Park
- City: San Diego
- Record: 63–99 (.389)
- Divisional place: 5th
- Owners: John Moores
- General managers: Kevin Towers
- Managers: Bud Black
- Television: 4SD; Cablemas (Spanish)
- Radio: XX Sports Radio; XEMO-AM (Spanish)

The 2008 San Diego Padres season was the 40th season in franchise history. The Padres were attempting to win the National League West for the third time in 4 years.

== Offseason ==
- December 14, 2007: The Padres traded David Freese to the St. Louis Cardinals for Jim Edmonds.

== Regular season ==
=== Opening Day lineup ===
Player	Pos
Brian Giles	RF
Tadahito Iguchi	2B
Kevin Kouzmanoff	3B
Adrián González	1B
Scott Hairston	CF
Khalil Greene	SS
Josh Bard	C
Paul McAnulty	LF
Jake Peavy	P

- On April 15, Brian Giles doubled in two runs off Rockies starter Ubaldo Jiménez for RBI numbers 999 and 1,000 for his career. The Padres won 6–0.
- Against the Colorado Rockies on April 17, at Petco Park, the Padres played the longest game in team history, in terms of innings (22), losing 2–1. The game was the second longest in team history, in terms of time, played in 6 hours, 16 minutes.

	COL	SD	TOTAL
AT BATS	73	74	147
HITS	14	11	25
LEFT ON BASE	30	24	54
TEAM LOB	16	14	30
STRUCK OUT	20	17	37
PITCHES THROWN	321	338	659
TOTAL PLAYERS USED	21	21	42
TOTAL PITCHERS USED	8	7	15

- On May 9, Jim Edmonds was given his unconditional release. The 37-year-old Edmonds batted .178 (16-for-90) with two doubles, one home run, six RBI and six runs scored in 26 games this season with the Padres, appearing in center field in all 26 contests (24 starts). To fill in the void by the release of Edmonds, Jody Gerut was recalled from AAA Portland.
- On May 10 vs. the Colorado Rockies at Petco Park, Greg Maddux became the ninth pitcher in Major League Baseball history to record his 350th win, the Padres winning 3–2.

=== Season standings ===
NL West
Team	W	L	Pct.	GB	Home	Road
Los Angeles Dodgers	84	78	.519	—	48‍–‍33	36‍–‍45
Arizona Diamondbacks	82	80	.506	2	48‍–‍33	34‍–‍47
Colorado Rockies	74	88	.457	10	43‍–‍38	31‍–‍50
San Francisco Giants	72	90	.444	12	37‍–‍44	35‍–‍46
San Diego Padres	63	99	.389	21	35‍–‍46	28‍–‍53

=== Record vs. opponents ===
2008 National League record Source: MLB Standings Grid – 2008
Team	AZ	ATL	CHC	CIN	COL	FLA	HOU	LAD	MIL	NYM	PHI	PIT	SD	SF	STL	WAS	AL
Arizona	–	3–5	2–4	2–4	15–3	2–7	4–2	8–10	2–5	3–3	3–4	4–3	10–8	11–7	3–4	4–2	6–9
Atlanta	5–3	–	0–6	3–3	4–3	10–8	3–3	4–2	3–6	11–7	4–14	2–5	5–1	2–5	2–5	6–12	8–7
Chicago	4–2	6–0	–	8–7	5–1	4–3	8–9	5–2	9–7	4–2	3–4	14–4	5–2	4–3	9–6	3–3	6–9
Cincinnati	4–2	3–3	7–8	–	1–5	6–2	3–12	1–7	10–8	3–4	3–5	6–9	4–3	5–1	5–10	4–3	9–6
Colorado	3–15	3–4	1–5	5–1	–	5–3	3–3	8–10	4–3	3–6	0–5	5–2	9–9	11–7	3–4	4–3	7–8
Florida	7–2	8–10	3–4	2–6	3–5	–	4–2	3–4	5–1	8–10	10–8	3–2	4–2	3–3	2–5	14–3	5–10
Houston	2–4	3–3	9–8	12–3	3–3	2–4	–	4–3	7–8	5–2	3–4	8–8	3–3	7–1	7–8	4–2	7–11
Los Angeles	10–8	2–4	2–5	7–1	10–8	4–3	3–4	–	4–2	3–4	4–4	5–2	11–7	9–9	2–4	3–3	5–10
Milwaukee	5–2	6–3	7–9	8–10	3–4	1–5	8–7	2–4	–	2–4	1–5	14–1	4–3	6–0	10–5	6–2	7–8
New York	3–3	7–11	2–4	4–3	6–3	10–8	2–5	4–3	4–2	–	11–7	4–3	2–5	5–1	4–3	12–6	9–6
Philadelphia	4–3	14–4	4–3	5–3	5–0	8–10	4–3	4–4	5–1	7–11	–	4–2	4–2	3–3	5–4	12–6	4–11
Pittsburgh	3–4	5–2	4–14	9–6	2–5	2–3	8–8	2–5	1–14	3–4	2–4	–	3–4	4–2	10–7	3–4	6–9
San Diego	8–10	1–5	2–5	3–4	9–9	2–4	3–3	7–11	3–4	5–2	2–4	4–3	–	5–13	1–6	5–1	3–15
San Francisco	7–11	5–2	3–4	1–5	7–11	3–3	1–7	9–9	0–6	1–5	3–3	2–4	13–5	–	4–3	7–0	6–12
St. Louis	4–3	5–2	6–9	10–5	4–3	5–2	8–7	4–2	5–10	3–4	4–5	7–10	6–1	3–4	–	5–1	7–8
Washington	2–4	12–6	3–3	3–4	3–4	3–14	2–4	3–3	2–6	6–12	6–12	4–3	1–5	0–7	1–5	–	8–10

=== Game log ===
2008 Game Log
March/April

#	Date	Opponent	Score	Win	Loss	Save	Attendance	Record
1	March 31	Astros	4–0	Peavy (1–0)	Oswalt (0–1)		44,965	1–0
2	April 1	Astros	2–1	Young (1–0)	Backe (0–1)	Hoffman (1)	20,825	2–0
3	April 2	Astros	9–6	Valverde (1–0)	Hoffman (0–1)		18,714	2–1
4	April 3	Astros	3–2	González (1–0)	Villarreal (0–1)	Hoffman (2)	24,432	3–1
5	April 4	Dodgers	7–1	Kuroda (1–0)	Thatcher (0–1)		42,474	3–2
6	April 5	Dodgers	4–1	Peavy (2–0)	Penny (1–1)		38,819	4–2
7	April 6	Dodgers	3–2	Broxton (1–0)	Hoffman (0–2)	Saito (1)	44,165	4–3
8	April 7	@ Giants	8–4	Maddux (1–0)	Cain (0–1)		42,861	5–3
9	April 8	@ Giants	3 – 2 (11)	Hennessey (1–0)	Meredith (0–1)		35,795	5–4
10	April 9	@ Giants	1–0	Walker (1–0)	Bell (0–1)		30,310	5–5
11	April 11	@ Dodgers	7–5	Peavy (3–0)	Penny (1–2)	Hoffman (3)	54,052	6–5
12	April 12	@ Dodgers	11–1	Lowe (1–0)	Young (1–1)		54,955	6–6
13	April 13	@ Dodgers	1–0	Maddux (2–0)	Billingsley (0–2)	Hoffman (4)	47,357	7–6
14	April 15	Rockies	6–0	Wolf (1–0)	Jiménez (1–2)		24,439	8–6
15	April 16	Rockies	10–2	Redman (2–1)	Germano (0–1)		21,730	8–7
16	April 17	Rockies	2 – 1 (22)	Wells (1–0)	Rusch (0–1)		25,984	8–8
17	April 18	@ D-backs	9–0	Haren (3–0)	Maddux (2–1)		26,783	8–9
18	April 19	@ D-backs	10–3	Cruz (1–0)	Thatcher (0–2)		39,726	8–10
19	April 20	@ D-backs	9–4	Wolf (2–0)	Johnson (0–1)		28,090	9–10
20	April 21	@ Astros	10–3	Oswalt (2–3)	Germano (0–2)		28,600	9–11
21	April 22	@ Astros	11–7	Valverde (3–1)	Bell (0–2)		33,434	9–12
22	April 23	Giants	3–2	Yabu (2–1)	Rusch (0–2)	Wilson (6)	25,506	9–13
23	April 24	Giants	1–0	Lincecum (4–0)	Young (1–2)	Wilson (7)	26,789	9–14
24	April 25	D-backs	5–1	Johnson (1–1)	Wolf (2–1)		31,340	9–15
25	April 26	D-backs	8–7	Rusch (1–2)	Petit (0–1)		31,295	10–15
26	April 27	D-backs	2–1	Webb (6–0)	Peavy (3–1)	Lyon (7)	40,074	10–16
27	April 29	@ Phillies	7–4	Hamels (3–3)	Maddux (2–2)		34,207	10–17
28	April 30	@ Phillies	4–2	Young (2–2)	Moyer (1–2)	Hoffman (5)	36,648	11–17

May

#	Date	Opponent	Score	Win	Loss	Save	Attendance	Record
29	May 1	@ Phillies	3–2	Gordon (3–2)	Thatcher (0–3)	Lidge (7)	33,001	11–18
30	May 2	@ Marlins	6–4	Hendrickson (5–1)	Germano (0–3)	Gregg (5)	14,562	11–19
31	May 3	@ Marlins	7–2	Peavy (4–1)	Nolasco (1–3)		37,689	12–19
32	May 4	@ Marlins	10–3	A. Miller (2–2)	Maddux (2–3)		11,422	12–20
33	May 6	@ Braves	5–3	Jurrjens (4–2)	Young (2–3)	Bennett (1)	21,657	12–21
34	May 7	@ Braves	5–2	Hudson (5–2)	Wolf (2–2)	Acosta (2)	25,194	12–22
35	May 8	@ Braves	5–4	Acosta (1–1)	Thatcher (0–4)		28,337	12–23
36	May 9	Rockies	4–2	Cook (6–1)	Peavy (4–2)	Fuentes (4)	31,057	12–24
37	May 10	Rockies	3–2	Maddux (3–3)	Jiménez (1–3)	Hoffman (6)	34,117	13–24
38	May 11	Rockies	6–1	Young (3–3)	Reynolds (0–1)		28,624	14–24
39	May 12	@ Cubs	12–3	Zambrano (6–1)	Wolf (2–3)		39,528	14–25
40	May 13	@ Cubs	4–3	Estes (1–0)	Marquis (1–3)	Hoffman (7)	40,028	15–25
41	May 14	@ Cubs	8–5	Lilly (4–4)	Peavy (4–3)		39,650	15–26
42	May 15	@ Cubs	4–0	Dempster (5–1)	Maddux (3–4)	Wood (8)	40,629	15–27
43	May 16	@ Mariners	6–4	Young (4–3)	Batista (3–5)	Hoffman (8)	35,586	16–27
44	May 17	@ Mariners	4–2	Bédard (3–2)	Wolf (2–4)	Putz (4)	32,290	16–28
45	May 18	@ Mariners	3–2	Rhodes (2–0)	Bell (0–3)	Putz (5)	35,483	16–29
46	May 19	Cardinals	8–2	Wellemeyer (5–1)	Ledezma (0–1)		22,638	16–30
47	May 20	Cardinals	3–2	Corey (1–0)	Piñeiro (2–3)	Hoffman (9)	27,181	17–30
48	May 21	Cardinals	11–3	Looper (6–3)	Young (4–4)		21,011	17–31
49	May 22	Reds	8–2	Wolf (3–4)	Harang (2–6)		22,047	18–31
50	May 23	Reds	3–2	Weathers (2–3)	Hoffman (0–3)	Cordero (10)	26,422	18–32
51	May 24	Reds	7–2	Arroyo (3–4)	Ledezma (0–2)		27,499	18–33
52	May 25	Reds	12 – 9 (18)	Banks (1–0)	Volquez (7–2)		36,508	19–33
53	May 27	Nationals	4–2	Bell (1–3)	Manning (0–1)	Hoffman (10)	18,744	20–33
54	May 28	Nationals	6–4	Pérez (2–4)	Estes (1–1)	Rauch (11)	19,201	20–34
55	May 29	Nationals	5–2	Bell (2–3)	Rivera (3–3)	Hoffman (11)	25,021	21–34
56	May 30	@ Giants	7 – 3 (13)	Baek (1–1)	Sadler (0–1)		37,178	22–34
57	May 31	@ Giants	5–1	Banks (2–0)	Misch (0–2)		34,921	23–34

June

#	Date	Opponent	Score	Win	Loss	Save	Attendance	Record
58	June 1	@ Giants	4–3 (10)	Hinshaw (1–0)	Hoffman (0–4)		33,867	23–35
59	June 2	Cubs	7–6	Zambrano (8–1)	Baek (1–2)	Wood (15)	30,259	23–36
60	June 3	Cubs	9–6	Marquis (3–3)	Corey (1–1)	Wood (16)	24,477	23–37
61	June 4	Cubs	2–1	Bell (3–3)	Lilly (5–5)	Hoffman (12)	25,258	24–37
62	June 5	Mets	2–1	Hoffman (1–4)	Schoeneweis (0–2)		28,867	25–37
63	June 6	Mets	2–1	Wolf (4–4)	Santana (7–4)	Hoffman (13)	27,749	26–37
64	June 7	Mets	2 – 1 (10)	Adams (1–0)	Feliciano (0–2)		38,972	27–37
65	June 8	Mets	8–6	Guevara (1–0)	Wagner (0–1)	Hoffman (14)	31,992	28–37
66	June 10	Dodgers	7–2	Proctor (1–0)	Hampson (0–1)		26,860	28–38
67	June 11	Dodgers	4–1	Wolf (5–4)	Billingsley (4–7)	Hoffman (15)	29,218	29–38
68	June 12	Dodgers	9–0	Peavy (5–3)	Kuroda (3–6)		36,354	30–38
69	June 13	@ Indians	9–5	Betancourt (2–3)	Meredith (0–2)	Kobayashi (3)	31,399	30–39
70	June 14	@ Indians	8 – 3 (10)	Bell (4–3)	Mujica (0–1)		37,484	31–39
71	June 15	@ Indians	7–3	Sabathia (5–8)	Maddux (3–5)		33,017	31–40
72	June 17	@ Yankees	8–0	Pettitte (7–5)	Wolf (5–5)		52,306	31–41
73	June 18	@ Yankees	8–5	Rasner (4–4)	Peavy (5–4)	Rivera (19)	52,628	31–42
74	June 19	@ Yankees	2–1	Veras (2–0)	Banks (2–1)	Rivera (20)	54,362	31–43
75	June 20	Tigers	6–2	Bell (5–3)	Rodney (0–1)		40,683	32–43
76	June 21	Tigers	7–5	Robertson (6–6)	Baek (1–3)	Jones (13)	34,749	32–44
77	June 22	Tigers	5–3	Verlander (4–9)	Wolf (5–6)	Jones (14)	28,779	32–45
78	June 24	Twins	3–1	Reyes (2–0)	Hoffman (1–5)	Nathan (20)	36,948	32–46
79	June 25	Twins	9–3	Perkins (4–2)	Maddux (3–6)		22,234	32–47
80	June 26	Twins	4–3	Baker (4–2)	Banks (2–2)	Nathan (21)	28,789	32–48
81	June 27	Mariners	5–2	Washburn (3–7)	Wolf (5–7)	Morrow (3)	28,640	32–49
82	June 28	Mariners	4–2	Silva (4–9)	Baek (1–4)	Morrow (4)	36,396	32–50
83	June 29	Mariners	9–2	Bédard (5–4)	Peavy (5–5)		29,966	32–51
84	June 30	@ Rockies	15–8	Bell (6–3)	Fuentes (1–4)		43,248	33–51

July

#	Date	Opponent	Score	Win	Loss	Save	Attendance	Record
85	July 1	@ Rockies	4–0	Cook (11–5)	Banks (2–3)		26,221	33–52
86	July 2	@ Rockies	8–1	Jiménez (3–8)	Wolf (5–8)		28,377	33–53
87	July 4	@ D-backs	5–1	Baek (2–4)	Haren (8–5)		49,110	34–53
88	July 5	@ D-backs	4–2	Peavy (6–5)	Davis (3–4)	Hoffman (16)	40,976	35–53
89	July 6	@ D-backs	3–2	Johnson (5–7)	Banks (2–4)	Lyon (18)	28,246	35–54
90	July 7	Marlins	3–1	Nolasco (10–4)	Maddux (3–7)	Gregg (16)	23,840	35–55
91	July 8	Marlins	10–1	Wolf (6–8)	Miller (5–8)		24,762	36–55
92	July 9	Marlins	5–2	Olsen (5–4)	Baek (2–5)	Gregg (17)	31,186	36–56
93	July 11	Braves	4–0	Peavy (7–5)	Reyes (3–8)	Hoffman (17)	40,232	37–56
94	July 12	Braves	4–1	Morton (2–2)	Maddux (3–8)	González (3)	42,438	37–57
95	July 13	Braves	12–3	Campillo (4–4)	Wolf (6–9)		31,347	37–58
96	July 17	@ Cardinals	4–3	Lohse (12–2)	Peavy (7–6)	Franklin (13)	42,148	37–59
97	July 18	@ Cardinals	11–7	McCllelan (2–4)	Bell (6–4)		44,398	37–60
98	July 19	@ Cardinals	6–5	Wolf (6–10)	Wellemeyer (8–4)	Franklin (14)	45,399	37–61
99	July 20	@ Cardinals	9–5	Thompson (2–2)	Corey (1–2)		44,214	37–62
100	July 21	@ Reds	6–4	Hensley (1–0)	Cordero (4–3)	Hoffman (18)	18,177	38–62
101	July 22	@ Reds	4–3 (11)	Majewski (1–0)	Corey (1–3)		21,233	38–63
102	July 23	@ Reds	9–5	Arroyo (9–7)	Meredith (0–3)	Cordero (21)	22,970	38–64
103	July 24	@ Pirates	9–1	Herrera (1–1)	Hensley (1–1)		17,916	38–65
104	July 25	@ Pirates	6–5	Baek (3–5)	Duke (4–8)	Hoffman (19)	35,727	39–65
105	July 26	@ Pirates	9–6	Banks (3–4)	Van Benschoten (1–3)	Hoffman (20)	27,794	40–65
106	July 27	@ Pirates	3–1	Peavy (8–6)	Grabow (5–3)	Hoffman (21)	21,721	41–65
107	July 28	D-backs	8–5	Maddux (4–8)	Owings (6–9)	Hoffman (22)	29,302	42–65
108	July 29	D-backs	3–0	Davis (4–5)	Hensley (1–2)	Lyon (22)	29,131	42–66
109	July 30	D-backs	7–3	Haren (11–5)	Baek (3–6)		31,755	42–67

August

#	Date	Opponent	Score	Win	Loss	Save	Attendance	Record
110	August 1	Giants	3–2 (10)	Romo (1–1)	Hoffman (1–6)	Wilson (29)	33,926	42–68
111	August 2	Giants	2–0	Zito (6–13)	Peavy (8–7)	Wilson (30)	41,688	42–69
112	August 3	Giants	4–1	Maddux (5–8)	Correia (2–6)	Hoffman (23)	33,060	43–69
113	August 5	@ Mets	6–5	Pelfrey (10–7)	Adams (1–1)	Schoeneweis (1)	52,130	43–70
114	August 6	@ Mets	4–2	Baek (4–6)	Martínez (3–3)	Hoffman (24)	48,018	44–70
115	August 7	@ Mets	5–3	Heilman (2–6)	Bell (6–5)		49,352	44–71
116	August 8	@ Rockies	6–3	Rusch (5–3)	Peavy (8–8)	Fuentes (21)	33,147	44–72
117	August 9	@ Rockies	8–3	Maddux (6–8)	Cook (14–8)	Hoffman (25)	41,640	45–72
118	August 10	@ Rockies	16–7	Hampson (1–1)	Hernández (0–1)		45,660	46–72
119	August 12	Brewers	5–2	Suppan (8–7)	Baek (4–7)	Torres (23)	28,373	46–73
120	August 13	Brewers	7–1	Sabathia (7–0)	Banks (3–5)		32,771	46–74
121	August 14	Brewers	3–2	Peavy (9–8)	Sheets (11–6)	Hoffman (26)	30,145	47–74
122	August 15	Phillies	1–0	Moyer (11–7)	Maddux (6–9)	Lidge (29)	37,558	47–75
123	August 16	Phillies	8–3	Reineke (1–0)	Kendrick (10–7)		33,956	48–75
124	August 17	Phillies	2–1	Hamels (10–8)	Baek (4–8)	Lidge (30)	34,756	48–76
125	August 19	@ D-backs	7–6	Davis (5–7)	Banks (3–6)	Peña (2)	24,739	48–77
126	August 20	@ D-backs	8–6	Haren (14–6)	Peavy (9–9)	Rauch (18)	26,518	48–78
127	August 21	@ D-backs	4–1	Webb (19–4)	Reineke (1–1)		25,611	48–79
128	August 22	@ Giants	5–0	Lincecum (14–3)	Baek (4–9)		33,615	48–80
129	August 23	@ Giants	4–3	Zito (8–15)	Adams (1–2)	Wilson (34)	37,081	48–81
130	August 24	@ Giants	7–4	Correia (3–7)	Adams (1–3)	Wilson (35)	37,174	48–82
131	August 25	D-backs	4–2	Hoffman (2–6)	Rauch (4–5)		29,197	49–82
132	August 26	D-backs	9–2	Reineke (2–1)	Webb (19–5)		32,104	50–82
133	August 27	D-backs	5–4	Adams (2–3)	Qualls (2–8)	Hoffman (27)	24,563	51–82
134	August 29	Rockies	9–4	Cook (16–8)	Hayhurst (0–1)		25,274	51–83
135	August 30	Rockies	9–4	Geer (1–0)	Jiménez (9–12)		30,240	52–83
136	August 31	Rockies	2–1	Hoffman (3–6)	Buchholz (6–4)		26,395	53–83

September

#	Date	Opponent	Score	Win	Loss	Save	Attendance	Record
137	September 1	@ Dodgers	5–2	Maddux (7–11)	Young (4–5)	Broxton (11)	44,087	53–84
138	September 2	@ Dodgers	8–4	Kershaw (3–5)	Baek (4–10)		39,330	53–85
139	September 3	@ Dodgers	6–4	Kuroda (8–10)	LeBlanc (0–1)	Broxton (12)	48,822	53–86
140	September 4	@ Brewers	5–2	Estes (2–1)	Suppan (10–8)	Hoffman (28)	33,182	54–86
141	September 5	@ Brewers	3–2 (11)	Shouse (5–1)	Falkenborg (2–3)		41,515	54–87
142	September 6	@ Brewers	1–0	Sheets (13–7)	Peavy (9–10)		42,667	54–88
143	September 7	@ Brewers	10–1	Young (5–5)	Parra (10–7)		44,568	55–88
144	September 8	Dodgers	4–0	Baek (5–10)	Maddux (7–12)		25,942	56–88
145	September 9	Dodgers	6–2	Beimel (5–1)	Bell (6–6)		26,614	56–89
146	September 10	Dodgers	7–2	Lowe (13–11)	Estes (2–2)		27,208	56–90
147	September 11	Giants	11–3	Geer (2–0)	Cain (8–12)		30,497	57–90
148	September 12	Giants	5–2	Sánchez (9–10)	Peavy (9–11)	Wilson (38)	24,610	57–91
149	September 13	Giants	7–0	Lincecum (17–3)	Young (5–6)		31,015	57–92
150	September 14	Giants	8–6 (10)	Romo (2–1)	Hayhurst (0–2)	Wilson (39)	25,476	57–92
151	September 15	@ Rockies	11–5	LeBlanc (1–1)	Reynolds (2–7)		25,296	58–93
152	September 16	@ Rockies	10–3	Jiménez (11–12)	Estes (2–3)		25,507	58–94
153	September 17	@ Rockies	1–0	Hernández (12–11)	Geer (2–1)	Fuentes (28)	25,155	58–95
154	September 19	@ Nationals	11–6 (14)	Hampson (2–1)	Speigner (0–1)		28,600	59–95
155	September 20	@ Nationals	6–1	Young (6–6)	Lannan (9–14)		27,474	60–95
156	September 21	@ Nationals	6–2	Baek (6–10)	Pérez (7–11)		29,608	61–95
157	September 22	Dodgers	10–1	Billingsley (16–10)	LeBlanc (1–2)		48,905	61–96
158	September 23	Dodgers	12–4	Kershaw (5–5)	Ekstrom (0–1)		44,776	61–97
159	September 24	Dodgers	7–5	Peavy (10–11)	Stults (2–3)	Hoffman (29)	52,569	62–97
160	September 26	Pirates	6–3	Snell (7–12)	Ekstrom (0–2)	Capps (21)	27,227	62–98
161	September 27	Pirates	3–2	Young (7–6)	Barthmaier (0–2)	Hoffman (30)	29,825	63–98
162	September 28	Pirates	6–1	Yates (6–3)	LeBlanc (1–3)		29,191	63–99

=== Roster ===
2008 San Diego Padres
Roster
Pitchers: 37 Mike Adams; 53 Cha Seung Baek; 38 Josh Banks; 21 Heath Bell; 41 Kevin Cameron; 40 Bryan Corey; 56 Mike Ekstrom; 55 Shawn Estes; 39 Brian Falkenborg; 52 Josh Geer; 57 Justin Germano; 52 Enrique González; 58 Carlos Guevara; 49 Charlie Haeger; 45 Justin Hampson; 57 Dirk Hayhurst; 34 Sean Henn; 34 Clay Hensley; 51 Trevor Hoffman; 58 Wade LeBlanc; 49 Wilfredo Ledezma; 30 Greg Maddux; 43 Cla Meredith; 40 Scott Patterson; 44 Jake Peavy; 59 Chad Reineke; 38 Glendon Rusch; 50 Joe Thatcher; 33,27 Brett Tomko; 40 Jared Wells; 25 Randy Wolf; 32 Chris Young	Catchers: 28 Josh Bard; 8 Michael Barrett; 1 Luke Carlin; 4 Nick Hundley; 14,26 Colt Morton; Infielders: 9 Matt Antonelli; 7 Tony Clark; 27 Callix Crabbe; 23 Adrián González; 2 Edgar Gonzalez; 3 Khalil Greene; 10 Tadahito Iguchi; 7 Sean Kazmar; 5 Kevin Kouzmanoff; 9 Brian Myrow; 15 Luis Rodríguez; 11 Craig Stansberry	Outfielders: 14 Chip Ambres; 15 Jim Edmonds; 33 Jody Gerut; 24 Brian Giles; 12 Scott Hairston; 16 Chase Headley; 26 Justin Huber; 11 Drew Macias; 18 Paul McAnulty; 25 Will Venable	Manager: 20 Bud Black; Coaches: 48 Darrel Akerfelds (bullpen); 36 Darren Balsley (pitching); 46 Craig Colbert (bench); 47 Glenn Hoffman (third base); 29 Wally Joyner (hitting); 17 Rick Renteria (first base)

== Player stats ==
=== Batting ===
==== Starters by position ====
Note: Pos = Position; G = Games played; AB = At bats; H = Hits; Avg. = Batting average; HR = Home runs; RBI = Runs batted in

Pos	Player	G	AB	H	Avg.	HR	RBI
C	Nick Hundley	60	198	47	.237	5	24
1B	Adrián González	162	616	172	.279	36	119
2B	Tadahito Iguchi	81	303	70	.231	2	24
SS	Khalil Greene	105	389	83	.213	10	35
3B	Kevin Kouzmanoff	154	624	162	.260	23	84
LF	Chase Headley	91	331	89	.269	9	38
CF	Jody Gerut	100	328	97	.296	14	43
RF	Brian Giles	147	559	171	.306	12	63

==== Other batters ====
Note: G = Games played; AB = At bats; H = Hits; Avg. = Batting average; HR = Home runs; RBI = Runs batted in

Player	G	AB	H	Avg.	HR	RBI
Scott Hairston	112	326	81	.248	17	31
Edgar Gonzalez	111	325	89	.274	7	33
Luis Rodríguez	64	202	58	.287	0	12
Josh Bard	57	178	36	.202	1	16
Paul McAnulty	66	135	28	.207	3	13
Will Venable	28	110	29	.264	2	10
Michael Barrett	30	94	19	.202	2	9
Luke Carlin	36	94	14	.149	1	6
Jim Edmonds	26	90	16	.178	1	6
Tony Clark	70	88	21	.239	1	11
Justin Huber	33	61	15	.246	2	8
Matt Antonelli	21	57	11	.193	1	3
Chip Ambres	24	41	8	.195	0	0
Sean Kazmar Jr.	19	39	8	.205	0	2
Callix Crabbe	21	34	6	.176	0	2
Brian Myrow	21	21	3	.143	1	3
Drew Macias	17	20	4	.200	2	5
Craig Stansberry	12	16	6	.375	0	2
Colt Morton	9	15	1	.067	0	1

=== Pitching ===
==== Starting pitchers ====
Note: G = Games pitched; IP = Innings pitched; W = Wins; L = Losses; ERA = Earned run average; SO = Strikeouts

Player	G	IP	W	L	ERA	SO
Jake Peavy	27	173.2	10	11	2.85	166
Greg Maddux	26	153.1	6	9	3.99	80
Randy Wolf	21	119.2	6	10	4.74	105
Cha-Seung Baek	22	111.0	6	9	4.62	77
Chris Young	18	102.1	7	6	3.96	93
Josh Banks	17	85.1	3	6	4.75	43
Shawn Estes	9	43.2	2	3	4.74	19
Josh Geer	5	27.0	2	1	2.67	16
Wade LeBlanc	5	21.1	1	3	8.02	14
Chad Reineke	4	18.0	2	1	5.00	13

==== Other pitchers ====
Note: G = Games pitched; IP = Innings pitched; W = Wins; L = Losses; ERA = Earned run average; SO = Strikeouts

Player	G	IP	W	L	ERA	SO
Wilfredo Ledezma	25	54.1	0	2	4.47	49
Justin Germano	12	43.2	0	3	5.98	17
Dirk Hayhurst	10	16.2	0	2	9.72	14

==== Relief pitchers ====
Note: G = Games pitched; W = Wins; L = Losses; SV = Saves; ERA = Earned run average; SO = Strikeouts

Player	G	W	L	SV	ERA	SO
Trevor Hoffman	48	3	6	30	3.77	46
Heath Bell	74	6	6	0	3.58	71
Cla Meredith	73	0	3	0	4.09	49
Mike Adams	54	2	3	0	2.48	74
Bryan Corey	39	1	3	0	6.23	18
Justin Hampson	35	2	1	0	2.93	19
Clay Hensley	32	1	2	0	5.31	26
Joe Thatcher	25	0	4	0	8.42	17
Glendon Rusch	12	1	2	0	6.41	12
Carlos Guevara	10	1	0	0	5.84	11
Kevin Cameron	10	0	0	0	3.60	5
Brian Falkenborg	9	0	1	0	4.22	10
Mike Ekstrom	8	0	2	0	7.45	6
Brett Tomko	6	0	0	0	1.93	9
Sean Henn	4	0	0	0	7.71	9
Charlie Haeger	4	0	0	0	16.62	4
Enrique González	4	1	0	0	10.80	1
Scott Patterson	3	0	0	0	0.00	5
Jared Wells	2	0	0	0	6.00	2

== Farm system ==
Level	Team	League	Manager
AAA	Portland Beavers	Pacific Coast League	Randy Ready
AA	San Antonio Missions	Texas League	Bill Masse
A	Lake Elsinore Storm	California League	Carlos Lezcano
A	Fort Wayne Wizards	Midwest League	Doug Dascenzo
A-Short Season	Eugene Emeralds	Northwest League	Greg Riddoch
Rookie	AZL Padres	Arizona League	José Flores
