= 2008 Arizona Diamondbacks season =

2008 Arizona Diamondbacks
- League: National League
- Division: West
- Ballpark: Chase Field
- City: Phoenix, Arizona
- Record: 82–80 (.506)
- Divisional place: 2nd
- Owners: Ken Kendrick; Jeff Moorad
- General managers: Josh Byrnes
- Managers: Bob Melvin
- Television: FSN Arizona (Daron Sutton, Mark Grace, Greg Schulte, Joe Garagiola, Matt Williams)
- Radio: KTAR (620 AM) (Greg Schulte, Jeff Munn, Tom Candiotti); KSUN (Spanish)

The 2008 Arizona Diamondbacks season was the 11th season of the franchise in Major League Baseball. Arizona tried to defend their National League West title after winning the division the previous year. But despite a franchise-best 20–8 start in the months of March and April, they couldn't maintain the division lead late in the season and collapsed with many losing streaks and stumbled to an 82–80 record, good enough for a second-place finish, only two games behind the Los Angeles Dodgers.

== Regular season ==
The 2008 season saw the best start in Diamondbacks history, going 20-8 in March/April and end up being way ahead in first place in the NL West. During the great start, Brandon Webb had his best career start by winning his first 9 decisions. The only low point was that starting pitcher Doug Davis was being diagnosed with thyroid cancer, before he could get his first start. Characteristically, Davis made his first two scheduled starts before undergoing surgery on April 8. Fortunately, his surgery was a success and was able to get back on the mound just 6 weeks later.

One of the more shining moments of April was when rookie pitcher Max Scherzer made his major league debut by pitching 4.1 perfect innings of relief, where he struck out 7 Astros. While doing this, Max passed Pete Richert of the 1962 Dodgers for the record for the number of consecutive batters retired (13) for a pitcher making his MLB debut as a reliever. Consequently, Scherzer was immediately promoted to the starting rotation, in the absence of Davis; he was relatively effective; in his four major-league outings (the aforementioned relief role against the Astros as well as three starts in Doug Davis' spot in the rotation), Scherzer had a 2.33 ERA with 23 strikeouts in 19 1/3 innings.

(Upon Davis' return, Scherzer was returned to the bullpen and optioned back to AAA Tucson in early June, and he eventually spent about a month on the Sidewinders' DL with shoulder inflammation. Davis, for his part, has had a less-than-stellar 2008 season, he is 4-7 with a 4.75 ERA as of late August.)

May was a much different month for the D-backs. The team saw a sharp decline in hitting and run production compared to April, and was their first losing month (11-17) since September 2006. The biggest disappointment had to have been the month-long slump right fielder Eric Byrnes fell into, where he hit .195 and had only 8 RBIs. Much speculation about his strained hamstring causing him to not perform well eventually led to him being put on the 15-day DL on May 27. He came back to action only to tear the left hamstring in late June, and was placed on the 60-day DL at that time.

The Diamondbacks continued to lead the NL West despite only being 47-48 at the All-Star break.

On July 17, 2008, Tony Clark was traded back to the D-backs from the San Diego Padres for a minor league pitcher, Evan Scribner.

On August 5, Dan Haren signed a four-year, $44.75 million deal with the Diamondbacks worth a guaranteed $41.25 million through 2012 and includes a $15.5 million club option for 2013 with a $3.5 million buyout.

Orlando Hudson, one of the more consistent offensive D-backs players in 2008, underwent season-ending surgery on his left wrist August 9 in the wake of a collision with catcher Brian McCann of the Atlanta Braves. Hudson became a free agent in the offseason and signed with the division rival Los Angeles Dodgers.

LF Eric Byrnes has been on the 60-day disabled list since late June, with a torn left hamstring, and was not expected to return to the lineup this season.

On August 11, 2008, Dallas Buck, RHP Micah Owings (pending clearing of waivers), and one other prospect were traded to the Reds (in last place in the NL Central at the time) in exchange for OF Adam Dunn. Dunn, who was tied for the major league lead with 32 home runs, was expected to provide a significant boost to an offense that has struggled to score runs for most of the season. Dunn seemed quite positive about being traded to a ballclub in first place in its division in August. The move was seen by some fans as a belated attempt by the D-backs to counter the trade by their division rival, the Los Angeles Dodgers, for Boston Red Sox power-hitting OF Manny Ramirez on July 31; and also to compensate for the injuries to Hudson and Byrnes, generally considered two of the more "power-hitting" Diamondbacks on a team which has relied heavily on pitching and defense in recent years.

Owings, once considered an excellent pitching prospect for the Diamondbacks, has struggled in the 2008 campaign with a 7.09 ERA since April 21. Owings must clear waivers before being able to join the Reds, otherwise he will remain a member of the Diamondbacks through the remainder of the season.

On August 31, the Diamondbacks acquired former World Series MVP David Eckstein to fill the hole at secondbase which was opened after Orlando Hudson was placed on the disabled list. Eckstein was traded from the Toronto Blue Jays for Minor League pitcher Chad Beck.

As of September 25, the D-Backs fell out of playoff contention with a 12-3 loss to the St. Louis Cardinals.

=== Season standings ===
==== National League West ====
NL West
| Team | W | L | Pct. | GB | Home | Road |
|---|---|---|---|---|---|---|
| Los Angeles Dodgers | 84 | 78 | .519 | — | 48‍–‍33 | 36‍–‍45 |
| Arizona Diamondbacks | 82 | 80 | .506 | 2 | 48‍–‍33 | 34‍–‍47 |
| Colorado Rockies | 74 | 88 | .457 | 10 | 43‍–‍38 | 31‍–‍50 |
| San Francisco Giants | 72 | 90 | .444 | 12 | 37‍–‍44 | 35‍–‍46 |
| San Diego Padres | 63 | 99 | .389 | 21 | 35‍–‍46 | 28‍–‍53 |

==== Record vs. opponents ====
2008 National League record Source: MLB Standings Grid – 2008
| Team | AZ | ATL | CHC | CIN | COL | FLA | HOU | LAD | MIL | NYM | PHI | PIT | SD | SF | STL | WAS | AL |
|---|---|---|---|---|---|---|---|---|---|---|---|---|---|---|---|---|---|
| Arizona | – | 3–5 | 2–4 | 2–4 | 15–3 | 2–7 | 4–2 | 8–10 | 2–5 | 3–3 | 3–4 | 4–3 | 10–8 | 11–7 | 3–4 | 4–2 | 6–9 |
| Atlanta | 5–3 | – | 0–6 | 3–3 | 4–3 | 10–8 | 3–3 | 4–2 | 3–6 | 11–7 | 4–14 | 2–5 | 5–1 | 2–5 | 2–5 | 6–12 | 8–7 |
| Chicago | 4–2 | 6–0 | – | 8–7 | 5–1 | 4–3 | 8–9 | 5–2 | 9–7 | 4–2 | 3–4 | 14–4 | 5–2 | 4–3 | 9–6 | 3–3 | 6–9 |
| Cincinnati | 4–2 | 3–3 | 7–8 | – | 1–5 | 6–2 | 3–12 | 1–7 | 10–8 | 3–4 | 3–5 | 6–9 | 4–3 | 5–1 | 5–10 | 4–3 | 9–6 |
| Colorado | 3–15 | 3–4 | 1–5 | 5–1 | – | 5–3 | 3–3 | 8–10 | 4–3 | 3–6 | 0–5 | 5–2 | 9–9 | 11–7 | 3–4 | 4–3 | 7–8 |
| Florida | 7–2 | 8–10 | 3–4 | 2–6 | 3–5 | – | 4–2 | 3–4 | 5–1 | 8–10 | 10–8 | 3–2 | 4–2 | 3–3 | 2–5 | 14–3 | 5–10 |
| Houston | 2–4 | 3–3 | 9–8 | 12–3 | 3–3 | 2–4 | – | 4–3 | 7–8 | 5–2 | 3–4 | 8–8 | 3–3 | 7–1 | 7–8 | 4–2 | 7–11 |
| Los Angeles | 10–8 | 2–4 | 2–5 | 7–1 | 10–8 | 4–3 | 3–4 | – | 4–2 | 3–4 | 4–4 | 5–2 | 11–7 | 9–9 | 2–4 | 3–3 | 5–10 |
| Milwaukee | 5–2 | 6–3 | 7–9 | 8–10 | 3–4 | 1–5 | 8–7 | 2–4 | – | 2–4 | 1–5 | 14–1 | 4–3 | 6–0 | 10–5 | 6–2 | 7–8 |
| New York | 3–3 | 7–11 | 2–4 | 4–3 | 6–3 | 10–8 | 2–5 | 4–3 | 4–2 | – | 11–7 | 4–3 | 2–5 | 5–1 | 4–3 | 12–6 | 9–6 |
| Philadelphia | 4–3 | 14–4 | 4–3 | 5–3 | 5–0 | 8–10 | 4–3 | 4–4 | 5–1 | 7–11 | – | 4–2 | 4–2 | 3–3 | 5–4 | 12–6 | 4–11 |
| Pittsburgh | 3–4 | 5–2 | 4–14 | 9–6 | 2–5 | 2–3 | 8–8 | 2–5 | 1–14 | 3–4 | 2–4 | – | 3–4 | 4–2 | 10–7 | 3–4 | 6–9 |
| San Diego | 8–10 | 1–5 | 2–5 | 3–4 | 9–9 | 2–4 | 3–3 | 7–11 | 3–4 | 5–2 | 2–4 | 4–3 | – | 5–13 | 1–6 | 5–1 | 3–15 |
| San Francisco | 7–11 | 5–2 | 3–4 | 1–5 | 7–11 | 3–3 | 1–7 | 9–9 | 0–6 | 1–5 | 3–3 | 2–4 | 13–5 | – | 4–3 | 7–0 | 6–12 |
| St. Louis | 4–3 | 5–2 | 6–9 | 10–5 | 4–3 | 5–2 | 8–7 | 4–2 | 5–10 | 3–4 | 4–5 | 7–10 | 6–1 | 3–4 | – | 5–1 | 7–8 |
| Washington | 2–4 | 12–6 | 3–3 | 3–4 | 3–4 | 3–14 | 2–4 | 3–3 | 2–6 | 6–12 | 6–12 | 4–3 | 1–5 | 0–7 | 1–5 | – | 8–10 |

=== Game log ===
Legend
| Diamondbacks Win | Diamondbacks Loss | Game postponed |

2008 Game Log (82-80)
March/April (20-8)

| # | Date | Opponent | Score | Win | Loss | Save | Attendance | Record |
|---|---|---|---|---|---|---|---|---|
| 1 | March 31 | @ Reds | 4 – 2 | Webb (1-0) | Harang (0-1) | Lyon (1) | 42,498 | 1-0 |
| 2 | April 2 | @ Reds | 6 – 5 | Affeldt (1-0) | Lyon (0-1) | | 14,016 | 1-1 |
| 3 | April 3 | @ Reds | 3 – 2 | Cueto (1-0) | Davis (0-1) | Cordero (1) | 11,987 | 1-2 |
| 4 | April 4 | @ Rockies | 8 – 1 | Owings (1-0) | Redman (0-1) | | 49,233 | 2-2 |
| 5 | April 5 | @ Rockies | 7 – 2 | Webb (2-0) | Francis (0-1) | | 43,124 | 3-2 |
| 6 | April 6 | @ Rockies | 5 – 2 (10) | Lyon (1-1) | Bowie (0-1) | Qualls (1) | 42,865 | 4-2 |
| 7 | April 7 | Dodgers | 9 – 3 | Haren (1-0) | Loaiza (0-2) | | 49,057 | 5-2 |
| 8 | April 8 | Dodgers | 10 – 5 | Davis (1-1) | Billingsley (0-1) | | 28,973 | 6-2 |
| 9 | April 9 | Dodgers | 4 – 3 | Owings (2-0) | Kuroda (1-1) | Lyon (2) | 23,331 | 7-2 |
| 10 | April 11 | Rockies | 8 – 2 | Webb (3-0) | Francis (0-2) | | 31,732 | 8-2 |
| 11 | April 12 | Rockies | 10 – 3 | Haren (2-0) | Morales (0-1) | | 29,256 | 9-2 |
| 12 | April 13 | Rockies | 13 – 5 | Cook (1-1) | González (0-1) | | 31,321 | 9-3 |
| 13 | April 14 | @ Giants | 5 – 4 | Yabu (1-1) | Qualls (0-1) | Wilson (4) | 30,371 | 9-4 |
| 14 | April 15 | @ Giants | 8 – 2 | Owings (3-0) | Correia (1-2) | | 30,068 | 10-4 |
| 15 | April 16 | @ Giants | 4 – 1 | Webb (4-0) | Zito (0-4) | Lyon (3) | 30,510 | 11-4 |
| 16 | April 18 | Padres | 9 – 0 | Haren (3-0) | Maddux (2-1) | | 26,783 | 12-4 |
| 17 | April 19 | Padres | 10 – 3 | Cruz (1-0) | Thatcher (0-2) | | 39,726 | 13-4 |
| 18 | April 20 | Padres | 9 – 4 | Wolf (2-0) | Johnson (0-1) | | 28,090 | 13-5 |
| 19 | April 21 | Giants | 4 – 2 | Owings (4-0) | Correia (1-3) | Lyon (4) | 22,097 | 14-5 |
| 20 | April 22 | Giants | 5 – 4 | Webb (5-0) | Zito (0-5) | Lyon (5) | 25,074 | 15-5 |
| 21 | April 23 | @ Dodgers | 8 – 3 | Lowe (2-1) | Haren (3-1) | Saito (2) | 42,590 | 15-6 |
| 22 | April 24 | @ Dodgers | 6 – 4 | González (1-1) | Billingsley (0-4) | Lyon (6) | 38,350 | 16-6 |
| 23 | April 25 | @ Padres | 5 – 1 | Johnson (1-1) | Wolf (2-1) | | 31,340 | 17-6 |
| 24 | April 26 | @ Padres | 8 – 7 (13) | Rusch (1-2) | Petit (0-1) | | 31,295 | 17-7 |
| 25 | April 27 | @ Padres | 2 – 1 | Webb (6-0) | Peavy (3-1) | Lyon (7) | 40,074 | 18-7 |
| 26 | April 28 | Astros | 5 – 3 | Haren (4-1) | Sampson (1-3) | Lyon (8) | 19,868 | 19-7 |
| 27 | April 29 | Astros | 6 – 4 | Brocail (1-0) | González (1-2) | Valverde (5) | 20,241 | 19-8 |
| 28 | April 30 | Astros | 8 – 7 | Medders (1-0) | Borkowski (0-2) | Lyon (9) | 21,519 | 20-8 |

May (11-17)

| # | Date | Opponent | Score | Win | Loss | Save | Attendance | Record |
|---|---|---|---|---|---|---|---|---|
| 29 | May 2 | Mets | 7 – 2 | Maine (3-2) | Owings (4-1) | | 35,682 | 20-9 |
| 30 | May 3 | Mets | 10 – 4 | Webb (7-0) | Pelfrey (2-2) | | 34,744 | 21-9 |
| 31 | May 4 | Mets | 5 – 2 | Sosa (4-1) | Qualls (0-2) | Wagner (7) | 37,593 | 21-10 |
| 32 | May 5 | Phillies | 11 – 4 | Moyer (2-2) | Scherzer (0-1) | | 21,266 | 21-11 |
| 33 | May 6 | Phillies | 6 – 4 | Johnson (2-1) | Eaton (0-1) | Lyon (10) | 26,234 | 22-11 |
| 34 | May 7 | Phillies | 5 – 4 | Romero (3-0) | Qualls (0-3) | Lidge (8) | 21,260 | 22-12 |
| 35 | May 8 | Phillies | 8 – 3 | Webb (8-0) | Myers (2-3) | | 21,942 | 23-12 |
| 36 | May 9 | @ Cubs | 3 – 1 | Lilly (3-4) | Haren (4-2) | Wood (6) | 40,236 | 23-13 |
| 37 | May 10 | @ Cubs | 7 – 2 | Eyre (1-0) | Qualls (0-4) | | 41,597 | 23-14 |
| 38 | May 11 | @ Cubs | 6 – 4 | Mármol (1-0) | Peña (0-1) | Wood (7) | 39,740 | 23-15 |
| 39 | May 13 | Rockies | 8 – 4 | Johnson (3-1) | Francis (0-4) | | 27,292 | 24-15 |
| 40 | May 14 | Rockies | 4 – 3 | Owings (5-1) | de la Rosa (1-2) | Lyon (11) | 23,127 | 25-15 |
| 41 | May 15 | Rockies | 8 – 5 | Webb (9-0) | Cook (6-2) | Lyon (12) | 21,447 | 26-15 |
| 42 | May 16 | Tigers | 4 – 3 | Haren (5-2) | Miner (1-3) | Peña (1) | 33,531 | 27-15 |
| 43 | May 17 | Tigers | 3 – 2 | Galarraga (3-2) | Scherzer (0-2) | Jones (6) | 48,804 | 27-16 |
| 44 | May 18 | Tigers | 4 – 0 | Johnson (4-1) | Robertson (1-4) | | 38,793 | 28-16 |
| 45 | May 20 | @ Marlins | 3 – 2 | Hendrickson (6-2) | Owings (5-2) | Gregg (8) | 10,696 | 28-17 |
| 46 | May 21 | @ Marlins | 3 – 1 | Nolasco (3-3) | Webb (9-1) | Gregg (9) | 11,227 | 28-18 |
| 47 | May 22 | @ Marlins | 4 – 0 | Miller (4-3) | Haren (5-3) | | 13,233 | 28-19 |
| 48 | May 23 | @ Braves | 11 – 1 | Davis (2-1) | Reyes (2-2) | | 27,263 | 29-19 |
| 49 | May 24 | @ Braves | 3 – 1 | Boyer (1-3) | Slaten (0-1) | | 36,263 | 29-20 |
| 50 | May 25 | @ Braves | 9 – 3 | Owings (6-2) | Glavine (2-2) | | 35,628 | 30-20 |
| 51 | May 26 | @ Braves | 7 – 3 | Acosta (3-1) | Webb (9-2) | | 29,635 | 30-21 |
| 52 | May 27 | Giants | 6 – 3 | Lincecum (7-1) | Haren (5-4) | Wilson (15) | 23,604 | 30-22 |
| 53 | May 28 | Giants | 11 – 3 | Sánchez (3-3) | Davis (2-2) | | 24,336 | 30-23 |
| 54 | May 29 | Giants | 4 – 3 | Walker (3-3) | Qualls (0-5) | Wilson (16) | 21,037 | 30-24 |
| 55 | May 30 | Nationals | 7 – 4 | Hanrahan (1-2) | Owings (6-3) | Rauch (12) | 25,391 | 30-25 |
| 56 | May 31 | Nationals | 4 – 0 | Webb (10-2) | Bergmann (1-2) | | 38,507 | 31-25 |

June (11-16)

| # | Date | Opponent | Score | Win | Loss | Save | Attendance | Record |
|---|---|---|---|---|---|---|---|---|
| 57 | June 1 | Nationals | 5 – 0 | Haren (6-4) | Hill (0-2) | | 28,249 | 32-25 |
| 58 | June 2 | @ Brewers | 4 – 3 | Mota (2-3) | Slaten (0-2) | Torres (6) | 27,562 | 32-26 |
| 59 | June 3 | @ Brewers | 7 – 1 | McClung (3-2) | Johnson (4-2) | | 29,478 | 32-27 |
| 60 | June 4 | @ Brewers | 10 – 1 | Parra (4-2) | Owings (6-4) | | 27,539 | 32-28 |
| 61 | June 6 | @ Pirates | 3 – 1 | Webb (11-2) | Snell (2-6) | Lyon (13) | 19,437 | 33-28 |
| 62 | June 7 | @ Pirates | 4 – 3 | Cruz (2-0) | Grabow (4-2) | Lyon (14) | 20,967 | 34-28 |
| 63 | June 8 | @ Pirates | 6 – 4 | Dumatrait (3-3) | Davis (2-3) | Capps (14) | 22,222 | 34-29 |
| 64 | June 9 | @ Pirates | 5 – 3 | Duke (4-4) | Johnson (4-3) | Capps (15) | 10,717 | 34-30 |
| 65 | June 10 | @ Mets | 9 – 5 | Qualls (1-5) | Smith (0-1) | | 45,808 | 35-30 |
| 66 | June 11 | @ Mets | 5 – 3 | Vargas (3-2) | González (1-3) | | 46,503 | 35-31 |
| 67 | June 12 | @ Mets | 5 – 4 | Lyon (2-1) | Heilman (0-3) | | 47,042 | 36-31 |
| 68 | June 13 | Royals | 1 – 0 | Buckner (1-0) | Yabuta (1-2) | | 33,323 | 37-31 |
| 69 | June 14 | Royals | 12 – 3 | Hochevar (4-5) | Johnson (4-4) | | 44,615 | 37-32 |
| 70 | June 15 | Royals | 8 – 3 | Meche (4-8) | Owings (6-5) | | 39,125 | 37-33 |
| 71 | June 17 | Athletics | 15 – 1 | Duchscherer (7-4) | Webb (11-3) | | 28,710 | 37-34 |
| 72 | June 18 | Athletics | 11 – 1 | Haren (7-4) | Blanton (3-10) | | 28,507 | 38-34 |
| 73 | June 19 | Athletics | 2 – 1 | Peña (1-1) | Foulke (0-2) | Lyon (15) | 31,997 | 39-34 |
| 74 | June 20 | @ Twins | 7 – 2 | Baker (3-2) | Johnson (4-5) | | 29,069 | 39-35 |
| 75 | June 21 | @ Twins | 6 – 1 | Blackburn (6-4) | Owings (6-6) | | 25,505 | 39-36 |
| 76 | June 22 | @ Twins | 5 – 3 | Hernández (8-4) | Webb (11-4) | Nathan (19) | 31,497 | 39-37 |
| 77 | June 23 | @ Red Sox | 2 – 1 | Haren (8-4) | Beckett (7-5) | Lyon (16) | 37,694 | 40-37 |
| 78 | June 24 | @ Red Sox | 5 – 4 | Smith (1-0) | Qualls (1-6) | Papelbon (22) | 37,867 | 40-38 |
| 79 | June 25 | @ Red Sox | 5 – 0 | Wakefield (5-5) | Johnson (4-6) | Papelbon (23) | 37,924 | 40-39 |
| 80 | June 27 | @ Marlins | 3 – 1 | Nolasco (8-4) | Owings (6-7) | Gregg (14) | 15,291 | 40-40 |
| 81 | June 28 | @ Marlins | 6 – 2 | Webb (12-4) | A. Miller (5-7) | | 27,777 | 41-40 |
| 82 | June 29 | @ Marlins | 4 – 3 | Nelson (1-0) | Lyon (2-2) | | 11,327 | 41-41 |
| 83 | June 30 | Brewers | 6 – 3 | Davis (3-3) | Bush (4-8) | Lyon (17) | 23,040 | 42-41 |

July (14-11)

| # | Date | Opponent | Score | Win | Loss | Save | Attendance | Record |
|---|---|---|---|---|---|---|---|---|
| 84 | July 1 | Brewers | 8 – 6 | Suppan (5-6) | Johnson (4-7) | Torres (14) | 21,736 | 42-42 |
| 85 | July 2 | Brewers | 4 – 3 | Riske (1-1) | Lyon (2-3) | Torres (15) | 22,324 | 42-43 |
| 86 | July 3 | Brewers | 6 – 5 | Rosales (1-0) | Torres (4-2) | | 23,842 | 43-43 |
| 87 | July 4 | Padres | 5 – 1 | Baek (2-4) | Haren (8-5) | | 49,110 | 43-44 |
| 88 | July 5 | Padres | 4 – 2 | Peavy (6-5) | Davis (3-4) | Hoffman (16) | 40,976 | 43-45 |
| 89 | July 6 | Padres | 3 – 2 | Johnson (5-7) | Banks (2-4) | Lyon (18) | 28,246 | 44-45 |
| 90 | July 8 | @ Nationals | 2 – 0 | Webb (13-4) | Pérez (2-6) | Lyon (19) | 26,820 | 45-45 |
| 91 | July 9 | @ Nationals | 5 – 0 | Lannan (5-9) | Owings (6-8) | | 25,862 | 45-46 |
| 92 | July 10 | @ Nationals | 7 – 5 (11) | Qualls (2-6) | Ayala (1-5) | | 27,330 | 46-46 |
| 93 | July 11 | @ Phillies | 6 – 5 (12) | Seánez (4-3) | Robertson (0-1) | | 45,028 | 46-47 |
| 94 | July 12 | @ Phillies | 10 – 4 | Johnson (6-7) | Eaton (3-8) | | 45,006 | 47-47 |
| 95 | July 13 | @ Phillies | 6 – 3 | Madson (2-0) | Qualls (2-7) | | 45,277 | 47-48 |
| 96 | July 18 | Dodgers | 8 – 7 (11) | Wade (1-1) | Slaten (0-3) | Broxton (1) | 38,561 | 47-49 |
| 97 | July 19 | Dodgers | 3 – 2 | Haren (9-5) | Billingsley (9-9) | Lyon (20) | 41,458 | 48-49 |
| 98 | July 20 | Dodgers | 6 – 5 | Troncoso (1-1) | Lyon (2-4) | Broxton (2) | 39,217 | 48-50 |
| 99 | July 21 | Cubs | 2 – 0 | Johnson (7-7) | Harden (5-2) | | 34,627 | 49-50 |
| 100 | July 22 | Cubs | 9 – 2 | Petit (1-1) | Marquis (6-6) | | 35,337 | 50-50 |
| 101 | July 23 | Cubs | 10 – 6 | Lilly (10-6) | Davis (3-5) | | 37,301 | 50-51 |
| 102 | July 25 | @ Giants | 10 – 2 | Haren (10-5) | Sánchez (8-6) | | 32,851 | 51-51 |
| 103 | July 26 | @ Giants | 5 – 3 | Webb (14-14) | Walker (3-6) | | 37,094 | 52-51 |
| 104 | July 27 | @ Giants | 7 – 2 | Johnson (8-7) | Zito (5-13) | | 40,071 | 53-51 |
| 105 | July 28 | @ Padres | 8 – 5 | Maddux (4-8) | Owings(6-9) | | 29,302 | 53-52 |
| 106 | July 29 | @ Padres | 3 – 0 | Davis (4-5) | Hensley (1-2) | | 29,131 | 54-52 |
| 107 | July 30 | @ Padres | 7 – 3 | Haren (11-5) | Baek (3-6) | | 31,755 | 55-52 |
| 108 | July 31 | @ Dodgers | 2 – 1 | Webb (15-4) | Lowe (8-9) | | 42,440 | 56-52 |

August (13-15)

| # | Date | Opponent | Score | Win | Loss | Save | Attendance | Record |
|---|---|---|---|---|---|---|---|---|
| 109 | August 1 | @ Dodgers | 2 – 1 | Johnson (9-7) | Park (4-3) | | 55,239 | 57-52 |
| 110 | August 2 | @ Dodgers | 4 – 2 | Kuroda (6-8) | Petit (1-2) | | 54,544 | 57-53 |
| 111 | August 3 | @ Dodgers | 9 – 3 | Wade (2-1) | Davis (4-6) | | 52,972 | 57-54 |
| 112 | August 4 | Pirates | 13 – 7 | Haren (12-5) | Davis (1-1) | | 21,826 | 58-54 |
| 113 | August 5 | Pirates | 3 – 1 | Webb (16-4) | Duke (4-10) | | 25,109 | 59-54 |
| 114 | August 6 | Pirates | 2 – 0 | Karstens (2-0) | Johnson (9-8) | | 28,556 | 59-55 |
| 115 | August 7 | Braves | 6 – 4 | Morton (3-5) | Petit (1-3) | Gonzalez (5) | 27,787 | 59-56 |
| 116 | August 8 | Braves | 11 – 6 | Campillo (7-4) | Davis (4-7) | Bennett (3) | 27,996 | 59-57 |
| 117 | August 9 | Braves | 11 – 4 | Jurrjens (11-7) | Haren (12-6) | | 36,613 | 59-58 |
| 118 | August 10 | Braves | 6 – 1 | Webb (17-4) | Hampton (1-1) | | 35,838 | 60-58 |
| 119 | August 12 | @ Rockies | 4-2 | Johnson (10-8) | Jiménez (8-11) | Lyon (25) | 31,218 | 61-58 |
| 120 | August 13 | @ Rockies | 6-5 | Buchholz (5-3) | Rauch (4-3) | Fuentes (22) | 30,247 | 61-59 |
| 121 | August 14 | @ Rockies | 6-2 | Haren (13-6) | Rusch (5-4) | | 27,575 | 62-59 |
| 122 | August 15 | @ Astros | 12-2 | Webb (18-4) | Rodríguez (7-5) | | 36,035 | 63-59 |
| 123 | August 16 | @ Astros | 11-5 | Petit (2-3) | Backe (7-12) | | 39,501 | 64-59 |
| 124 | August 17 | @ Astros | 3-0 | Oswalt (11-8) | Johnson (10-9) | Valverde (31) | 42,619 | 64-60 |
| 125 | August 19 | Padres | 7-6 | Davis (5-7) | Banks (3-6) | Peña (2) | 24,739 | 65-60 |
| 126 | August 20 | Padres | 8-6 | Haren (14-6) | Peavy (9-9) | Rauch (18) | 26,518 | 66-60 |
| 127 | August 21 | Padres | 4-1 | Webb (19-4) | Reineke (1-1) | | 25,611 | 67-60 |
| 128 | August 22 | Marlins | 5-4 | Rhodes (1-0) | Rauch (4-4) | Gregg (28) | 28,201 | 67-61 |
| 129 | August 23 | Marlins | 7-1 | Petit (3-3) | Volstad (4-3) | | 44,294 | 68-61 |
| 130 | August 24 | Marlins | 5-2 | Nolasco (13-7) | Davis (5-8) | Gregg (29) | 31,518 | 68-62 |
| 131 | August 25 | @ Padres | 4-2 | Hoffman (2-6) | Rauch (4-5) | | 29,197 | 68-63 |
| 132 | August 26 | @ Padres | 9-2 | Reineke (2-1) | Webb (19-5) | | 32,104 | 68-64 |
| 133 | August 27 | @ Padres | 5-4 | Adams (2-3) | Qualls (2-8) | Hoffman (27) | 24,563 | 68-65 |
| 134 | August 29 | Dodgers | 9-3 | Davis (6-8) | Kuroda (7-10) | | 32,610 | 69-65 |
| 135 | August 30 | Dodgers | 6-2 | Billingsley (13-10) | Haren (14-7) | | 49,045 | 69-66 |
| 136 | August 31 | Dodgers | 8-1 | Lowe (11-11) | Webb (19-6) | | 43,456 | 69-67 |

September (13-13)

| # | Date | Opponent | Score | Win | Loss | Save | Attendance | Record |
|---|---|---|---|---|---|---|---|---|
| 137 | September 1 | Cardinals | 8-6 | Qualls (3-8) | McClellan (2-7) | Lyon (26) | 35,075 | 70-67 |
| 138 | September 2 | Cardinals | 8-2 | Wainwright (8-3) | Petit (3-4) | | 27,568 | 70-68 |
| 139 | September 3 | Cardinals | 4-3 | Qualls (4-8) | Perez (2-2) | | 24,350 | 71-68 |
| 140 | September 5 | @ Dodgers | 7-0 | Lowe (12-11) | Haren (14-8) | | 52,270 | 71-69 |
| 141 | September 6 | @ Dodgers | 7-2 | Billingsley (14-10) | Webb (19-7) | | 47,543 | 71-70 |
| 142 | September 7 | @ Dodgers | 5-3 | Kuo (5-2) | Rauch (4-6) | Broxton (13) | 54,137 | 71-71 |
| 143 | September 8 | @ Giants | 6-2 | Lincecum (16-3) | Petit (3-5) | | 30,252 | 71-72 |
| 144 | September 9 | @ Giants | 5-4 | Wilson (3-2) | Rauch (4-7) | | 30,518 | 71-73 |
| 145 | September 10 | @ Giants | 4-3 | Hinshaw (2-1) | Lyon (2-5) | | 30,992 | 71-74 |
| 146 | September 12 | Reds | 3-2 | Webb (20-7) | Harang (4-16) | Qualls (3) | 29,046 | 72-74 |
| 147 | September 13 | Reds | 3-2 (10) | Weathers (3-6) | Peña (1-2) | Cordero (30) | 45,075 | 72-75 |
| 148 | September 14 | Reds | 2-1 (10) | Weathers (4-6) | Rauch (4-8) | Cordero (31) | 27,297 | 72-76 |
| 149 | September 15 | Giants | 3-1 | Peña (2-2) | Hennessey (1-2) | Qualls (4) | 25,969 | 73-76 |
| 150 | September 16 | Giants | 2-0 | Haren (15-8) | Cain (8-13) | | 33,195 | 74-76 |
| 151 | September 17 | Giants | 7-6 | Webb (21-7) | Sánchez (9-11) | Peña (3) | 22,616 | 75-76 |
| 152 | September 18 | Giants | 3-2 | Cruz (3-0) | Lincecum (17-4) | Qualls (5) | 34,323 | 76-76 |
| 153 | September 19 | @ Rockies | 3-2 | de la Rosa (9-8) | Scherzer (0-3) | Fuentes (29) | 43,137 | 76-77 |
| 154 | September 20 | @ Rockies | 5-3 | Peña (3-2) | Fuentes (1-5) | Qualls (6) | 38,283 | 77-77 |
| 155 | September 21 | @ Rockies | 13-4 | Haren (16-8) | Reynolds (2-8) | | 32,915 | 78-77 |
| 156 | September 22 | @ Cardinals | 4-2 | Webb (22-7) | Wellemeyer (12-9) | Qualls (7) | 40,349 | 79-77 |
| 157 | September 23 | @ Cardinals | 7-4 | Lohse (15-6) | Johnson (10-10) | Franklin (16) | 40,013 | 79-78 |
| 158 | September 24 | @ Cardinals | 4-2 | Wainwright (11-3) | Scherzer (0-4) | Franklin (17) | 40,029 | 79-79 |
| 159 | September 25 | @ Cardinals | 12-3 | Piñeiro (7-7) | Rosales (1-1) | | 40,502 | 79-80 |
| 160 | September 26 | Rockies | 6-4 | Cruz (4-0) | Grilli (3-3) | Qualls (8) | 34,950 | 80-80 |
| 161 | September 27 | Rockies | 6-4 | Lyon (3-5) | Corpas (3-4) | Qualls (9) | 33,234 | 81-80 |
| 162 | September 28 | Rockies | 2-1 | Johnson (11-10) | Vizcaíno (1-2) | | 35,908 | 82-80 |

=== Roster ===
2008 Arizona Diamondbacks
Roster
| Pitchers: 33 Billy Buckner; 37 Juan Cruz; 49 Doug Davis; 31 Édgar González; 15 Dan Haren; 51 Randy Johnson; 46 Wilfredo Ledezma; 38 Brandon Lyon; 52 Brandon Medders; 44 Micah Owings; 36 Jailen Peguero; 56 Tony Peña; 48 Yusmeiro Petit; 50 Chad Qualls; 57 Jon Rauch; 41 Connor Robertson; 47 Leo Rosales; 39 Max Scherzer; 45 Doug Slaten; 17 Brandon Webb | Catchers: 7 Robby Hammock; 26 Miguel Montero; 19 Chris Snyder; Infielders: 2 Chris Burke; 13 Tony Clark; 21 Jamie D'Antona; 6 Stephen Drew; 4 David Eckstein; 1 Orlando Hudson; 11 Augie Ojeda; 27 Mark Reynolds; 18 Chad Tracy; 29 Josh Whitesell | Outfielders: 4 Emilio Bonifacio; 22 Eric Byrnes; 32 Adam Dunn; 34 Conor Jackson; 28 Alex Romero; 12 Jeff Salazar; 10 Justin Upton; 24 Chris Young | Manager: 3 Bob Melvin; Coaches: 23 Kirk Gibson (bench); 5 Chip Hale (third base); 35 Bryan Price (pitching); 9 Rick Schu (hitting); 53 Glenn Sherlock (bullpen); 8 Lee Tinsley (first base) |

== Player stats ==
=== Batting ===
Note: G = Games played; AB = At bats; R = Runs scored; H = Hits; 2B = Doubles; 3B = Triples; HR = Home runs; RBI = Runs batted in; AVG = Batting average; SB = Stolen bases

| Player | G | AB | R | H | 2B | 3B | HR | RBI | AVG | SB |
|---|---|---|---|---|---|---|---|---|---|---|
| Emilio Bonifacio | 8 | 12 | 3 | 2 | 1 | 0 | 0 | 2 | .167 | 1 |
| Billy Buckner* | 10 | 1 | 0 | 0 | 0 | 0 | 0 | 0 | .000 | 0 |
| Chris Burke | 86 | 165 | 20 | 32 | 5 | 1 | 2 | 12 | .194 | 5 |
| Eric Byrnes | 52 | 206 | 28 | 43 | 13 | 1 | 6 | 23 | .209 | 4 |
| Tony Clark | 38 | 63 | 7 | 13 | 2 | 0 | 2 | 13 | .206 | 0 |
| Jamie D'Antona | 18 | 17 | 2 | 3 | 0 | 0 | 0 | 1 | .176 | 0 |
| Doug Davis* | 25 | 42 | 0 | 4 | 0 | 0 | 0 | 3 | .095 | 0 |
| Stephen Drew | 152 | 611 | 91 | 178 | 44 | 11 | 21 | 67 | .291 | 3 |
| Adam Dunn | 44 | 144 | 21 | 35 | 9 | 0 | 8 | 26 | .243 | 1 |
| David Eckstein | 18 | 64 | 5 | 14 | 3 | 0 | 1 | 4 | .219 | 0 |
| Édgar González* | 17 | 10 | 0 | 1 | 1 | 0 | 0 | 2 | .100 | 0 |
| Robby Hammock | 18 | 42 | 4 | 8 | 1 | 0 | 0 | 2 | .190 | 0 |
| Dan Haren* | 33 | 76 | 8 | 16 | 7 | 0 | 0 | 6 | .211 | 0 |
| Orlando Hudson | 107 | 407 | 54 | 124 | 29 | 3 | 8 | 41 | .305 | 4 |
| Conor Jackson | 144 | 540 | 87 | 162 | 31 | 6 | 12 | 75 | .300 | 10 |
| Randy Johnson* | 28 | 50 | 2 | 7 | 1 | 0 | 0 | 5 | .140 | 0 |
| Miguel Montero | 70 | 184 | 24 | 47 | 16 | 1 | 5 | 18 | .255 | 0 |
| Augie Ojeda | 105 | 231 | 27 | 56 | 9 | 2 | 0 | 17 | .242 | 0 |
| Micah Owings* | 35 | 52 | 7 | 15 | 2 | 0 | 1 | 3 | .288 | 0 |
| Yusmeiro Petit* | 19 | 13 | 0 | 0 | 0 | 0 | 0 | 0 | .000 | 0 |
| Chad Qualls* | 75 | 2 | 0 | 0 | 0 | 0 | 0 | 0 | .000 | 0 |
| Mark Reynolds | 152 | 539 | 87 | 129 | 28 | 3 | 28 | 97 | .239 | 11 |
| Alex Romero | 78 | 135 | 13 | 31 | 8 | 2 | 1 | 12 | .230 | 4 |
| Jeff Salazar | 90 | 128 | 17 | 27 | 5 | 3 | 2 | 12 | .211 | 0 |
| Max Scherzer* | 17 | 13 | 1 | 0 | 0 | 0 | 0 | 0 | .000 | 0 |
| Chris Snyder | 115 | 334 | 47 | 79 | 22 | 1 | 16 | 64 | .237 | 0 |
| Chad Tracy | 88 | 273 | 25 | 73 | 16 | 0 | 8 | 39 | .267 | 0 |
| Justin Upton | 108 | 356 | 52 | 89 | 19 | 6 | 15 | 42 | .250 | 1 |
| Brandon Webb* | 33 | 67 | 2 | 10 | 4 | 0 | 0 | 11 | .149 | 0 |
| Josh Whitesell | 7 | 7 | 1 | 2 | 0 | 0 | 1 | 1 | .286 | 0 |
| Chris Young | 160 | 625 | 85 | 155 | 42 | 7 | 22 | 85 | .248 | 14 |
| Team totals | 162 | 5409 | 720 | 1355 | 318 | 47 | 159 | 683 | .251 | 58 |

*Note: Only pitchers noted with an asterisk who officially batted during the season are included above.

=== Pitching ===
Note: W = Wins; L = Losses; ERA = Earned run average; G = Games pitched; GS = Games started; SV = Saves; IP = Innings pitched; R = Runs allowed; ER = Earned runs allowed; BB = Walks allowed; K = Strikeouts

| Player | W | L | ERA | G | GS | SV | IP | R | ER | BB | K |
|---|---|---|---|---|---|---|---|---|---|---|---|
| Billy Buckner | 1 | 0 | 3.21 | 10 | 0 | 0 | 14.0 | 5 | 5 | 4 | 11 |
| Juan Cruz | 4 | 0 | 2.61 | 57 | 0 | 0 | 51.2 | 17 | 15 | 31 | 71 |
| Doug Davis | 6 | 8 | 4.32 | 26 | 26 | 0 | 146.0 | 76 | 70 | 64 | 112 |
| Édgar González | 1 | 3 | 6.00 | 17 | 6 | 0 | 48.0 | 34 | 32 | 21 | 32 |
| Dan Haren | 16 | 8 | 3.33 | 33 | 33 | 0 | 216.0 | 86 | 80 | 40 | 206 |
| Randy Johnson | 11 | 10 | 3.91 | 30 | 30 | 0 | 184.0 | 92 | 80 | 44 | 173 |
| Wilfredo Ledezma | 0 | 2 | 4.17 | 28 | 6 | 0 | 58.1 | 29 | 27 | 41 | 53 |
| Brandon Lyon | 3 | 5 | 4.70 | 61 | 0 | 26 | 59.1 | 34 | 31 | 13 | 44 |
| Brandon Medders | 1 | 0 | 4.58 | 18 | 0 | 0 | 19.2 | 11 | 10 | 11 | 8 |
| Micah Owings | 6 | 9 | 5.93 | 22 | 18 | 0 | 104.2 | 73 | 69 | 41 | 87 |
| Jailen Peguero | 0 | 0 | 4.82 | 7 | 0 | 0 | 9.1 | 6 | 5 | 4 | 5 |
| Tony Peña | 3 | 2 | 4.33 | 72 | 0 | 3 | 72.2 | 38 | 35 | 17 | 52 |
| Yusmeiro Petit | 3 | 5 | 4.31 | 19 | 8 | 0 | 56.1 | 29 | 27 | 14 | 42 |
| Chad Qualls | 4 | 8 | 2.81 | 77 | 0 | 9 | 73.2 | 29 | 23 | 18 | 71 |
| Jon Rauch | 4 | 8 | 4.14 | 74 | 0 | 1 | 71.2 | 36 | 33 | 16 | 66 |
| Connor Robertson | 0 | 1 | 5.14 | 6 | 0 | 0 | 7.0 | 4 | 4 | 2 | 2 |
| Leo Rosales | 1 | 1 | 4.20 | 27 | 0 | 0 | 30.0 | 15 | 14 | 15 | 18 |
| Max Scherzer | 0 | 4 | 3.05 | 16 | 7 | 0 | 56.0 | 24 | 19 | 21 | 66 |
| Doug Slaten | 0 | 3 | 4.73 | 45 | 0 | 0 | 32.1 | 20 | 17 | 14 | 20 |
| Brandon Webb | 22 | 7 | 3.30 | 34 | 34 | 0 | 226.2 | 95 | 83 | 65 | 183 |
| Team totals | 82 | 80 | 3.98 | 162 | 162 | 39 | 1434.2 | 706 | 635 | 451 | 1229 |

== Farm system ==
| Level | Team | League | Manager |
|---|---|---|---|
| AAA | Tucson Sidewinders | Pacific Coast League | Bill Plummer |
| AA | Mobile BayBears | Southern League | Héctor de la Cruz |
| A | Visalia Oaks | California League | Mike Bell |
| A | South Bend Silver Hawks | Midwest League | Mark Haley |
| A-Short Season | Yakima Bears | Northwest League | Bob Didier |
| Rookie | Missoula Osprey | Pioneer League | Audo Vicente |
