= Dirk Hayhurst =

American baseball player (born 1981)

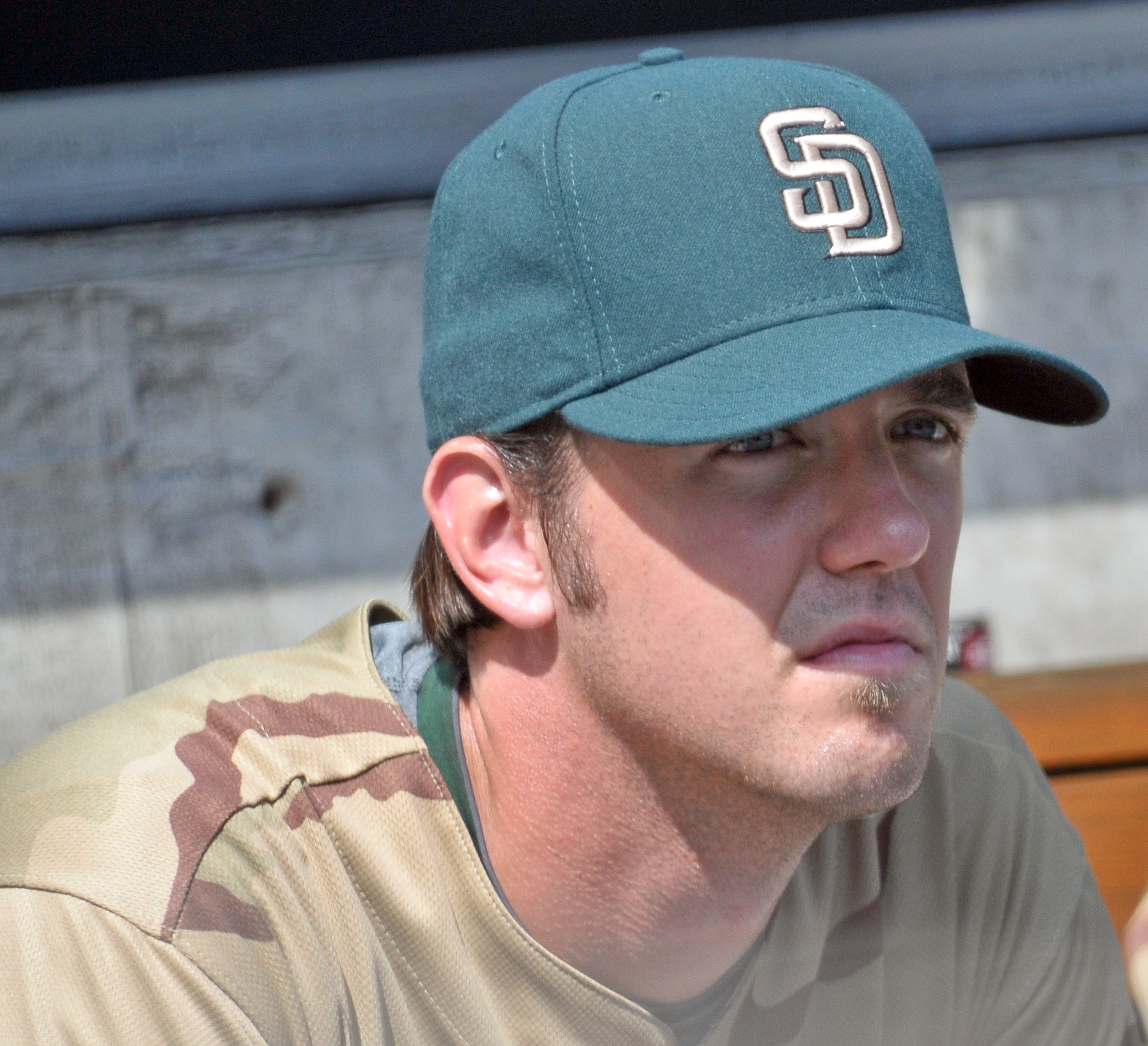
- Hayhurst as a member of the San Diego Padres.
- Pitcher
- Born: March 24, 1981 (age 45); Canton, Ohio, U.S.
- Batted: Left Threw: Right

MLB debut
- August 23, 2008, for the San Diego Padres

Last MLB appearance
- October 2, 2009, for the Toronto Blue Jays

MLB statistics
- Win–loss record: 0–2
- Earned run average: 5.72
- Strikeouts: 27
- Stats at Baseball Reference

Teams
- San Diego Padres (2008); Toronto Blue Jays (2009)

Dirk Von Hayhurst (born March 24, 1981) is an American author and broadcaster, and formerly a professional baseball pitcher. Hayhurst played in Major League Baseball for the San Diego Padres in 2008 and for the Toronto Blue Jays in 2009. Following the end of his playing career, Hayhurst wrote four books about his experiences in professional baseball.

== Early life ==
Hayhurst attended Canton South High School in Canton, Ohio. He enrolled at Kent State University, and played college baseball for the Kent State Golden Flashes until 2003. He was named the Mid-American Conference Baseball Pitcher of the Year in 2003. He played collegiate summer baseball with the Bethesda Big Train in 2001.

== Professional career ==
=== Baseball ===
==== San Diego Padres ====
Hayhurst was selected by the San Diego Padres in the 8th round of the 2003 Major League Baseball draft. He was called up from the Triple-A Portland Beavers and made his major league debut on August 23, 2008, for the San Diego Padres against Barry Zito and the San Francisco Giants at AT&T Park in San Francisco, California.

==== Toronto Blue Jays ====
Hayhurst was claimed off waivers by the Toronto Blue Jays on October 6, 2008, but was released four months later before the season started, and re-signed to a minor league deal. On June 2, 2009, Hayhurst's contract was purchased by the Blue Jays from their Triple-A affiliate, the Las Vegas 51s.

Hayhurst missed the entire 2010 season while on the disabled list following surgery on his right shoulder. He was sent outright to the minors following the season.

==== Tampa Bay Rays ====
Prior to the 2011 season, Hayhurst signed a minor league contract with the Tampa Bay Rays with an invitation to spring training. Hayhurst was interviewed by Frank Stasio for North Carolina Public Radio's The State of Things on June 27, 2011, about his time playing for the Durham Bulls. He was later released from his contract on August 29, 2011.

=== Broadcasting ===
After his release from Tampa, Hayhurst began to appear regularly as a baseball insider on TSN Radio 1050. On June 8, 2012, Hayhurst announced that he signed with Rogers owned Sportsnet 590 The Fan to co-host Baseball Central alongside Sam Cosentino, starting July 3, 2012.

Hayhurst continued to work for Sportsnet during the 2013 season. During Spring Training, he worked as a colour analyst on radio and web broadcasts. He has performed colour analyst duties on radio broadcasts when Jack Morris was either off or working on television.

Hayhurst was hired by TBS as a TV studio analyst for the 2013 MLB postseason.

==== Controversy ====
On May 1, 2013, Hayhurst accused Boston Red Sox pitcher Clay Buchholz of cheating. Hayhurst claimed that he observed Buchholz "loading the ball" by using Crisco or sunscreen to change the movement of the ball. Buchholz and the Red Sox responded by claiming the substance seen on his arm was rosin, used legally to aid the grip of a pitcher.

On July 4, J. P. Arencibia responded to Hayhurst's criticism of his defensive play, as well as his struggles at the plate during the first half of the season. Arencibia commented, in regards to Hayhurst and Gregg Zaun, that "...speaking for myself and the team, there's not one person in our clubhouse that respects those guys". Arencibia went on to say that Hayhurst was a "below-average player" during the time they spent in Triple-A.

In an October 5, 2013 broadcast following Game 2 of the American League Division Series between the Tampa Bay Rays and the Boston Red Sox, Hayhurst and fellow commentator Tom Verducci criticized Rays pitcher David Price for his performance in the game, in which Price gave up nine hits and seven earned runs in seven innings as the Rays lost to the Red Sox. Price responded via Twitter: "Dirk Hayhurst...COULDNT hack it...Tom Verducci wasn't even a water boy in high school...but yet they can still bash a player...SAVE IT NERDS". Price apologized the next day.

== Personal life ==
Hayhurst was well known for his popular 'Non-Prospect Diary' for Baseball America and he has also contributed numerous articles to his hometown newspaper, The Repository.

His book about his time in the minor leagues, The Bullpen Gospels, was published on March 30, 2010. Keith Olbermann plugged the book on MSNBC's Countdown with Keith Olbermann, saying it "might be one of the best baseball books written in forty years." The Bullpen Gospels debuted on the Paperback Non-fiction New York Times Best Sellers List at #19.

His second book, Out Of My League, was published in 2012. His third book, Wild Pitches, was released in 2013. It consisted of stories cut out of Out of My League. His fourth book, Bigger Than the Game: Restitching a Major League Life, was released February 25, 2014.
