= Carlos Guevara (baseball) =

American baseball player (born 1982)

- Pitcher
- Born: March 18, 1982 (age 44); Uvalde, Texas, U.S.
- Batted: Right Threw: Right

MLB debut
- June 2, 2008, for the San Diego Padres

Last MLB appearance
- July 2, 2008, for the San Diego Padres

MLB statistics
- Win–loss record: 1-0
- Earned run average: 5.84
- Strikeouts: 11
- Stats at Baseball Reference

Teams
- San Diego Padres (2008)

Jose Carlos Guevara (born March 18, 1982) is an American former Major League Baseball and Minor League Baseball pitcher.

== Early life and education ==
Guevara played on the 2001 St. Mary's team which won the 2001 NCAA Division II College World Series.

== Professional career ==
=== Cincinnati Reds ===
Guevara was selected by the Cincinnati Reds in the seventh round (201st overall) of the 2003 Major League Baseball draft.

After signing with the Reds, Guevara began his career with the Billings Mustangs of the rookie league. He started two games for the Mustangs, going 1-0 with a 0.82 earned run average and striking out 14 in 11 innings.

Guevara finished his 2003 season with the Single-A Dayton Dragons. In 12 games including three starts, Guevara went 0-1 with a 3.4 ERA. He allowed 37 hits in 39.1 innings while striking out 39.

Guevara remained in Dayton for the entire 2004 season. He worked exclusively as a reliever, pitching 56.2 innings in 44 appearances. On the season, he posted a 3-4 record with nine saves. He also posted a 2.86 ERA and averaged more than a strikeout per inning, recording 90 on the season.

In 2005, Guevara was promoted to the High-A Sarasota Reds. He again appeared in 44 games, going 4-3 with a 2.45 ERA. He walked 14 batters in 51.1 innings while striking out 65.

Guevara pitched the 2006 and 2007 seasons for the Double-A Chattanooga Lookouts. In 2006, he went 2-3 with a 3.72 ERA in 49 appearances spanning 77.1 innings. The following season, Guevara went 1-2 with a 2.32 ERA in 51 appearances. He also struck out 87 hitters after striking out 89 the season before.

=== San Diego Padres ===
On December 6, 2007, Guevara was selected by the Florida Marlins in the Rule 5 draft and traded to the San Diego Padres the same day. On March 27, 2008, Guevara was placed on the 15-day disabled list with a strained groin. In five rehab appearances with the Triple-A Portland Beavers, Guevara pitched six scoreless innings, allowing two hits and striking out five. He was activated from the disabled list on May 31 when Padres starter Shawn Estes was placed on the disabled list. Guevara was released in April 2009 and signed with the independent Lincoln Saltdogs. The Padres purchased his contract on June 18, 2009.

=== Colorado Rockies ===
In January, 2010, Guevara signed a minor league deal with the Colorado Rockies.

== Rookie baseball card ==
Guevara has one rookie card in the 2008 Topps baseball card products set; however, every known copy of the card has his image mislabeled as Callix Crabbe.

== See also ==
- Rule 5 draft results
