= Matt Antonelli =

American baseball player (born 1985)

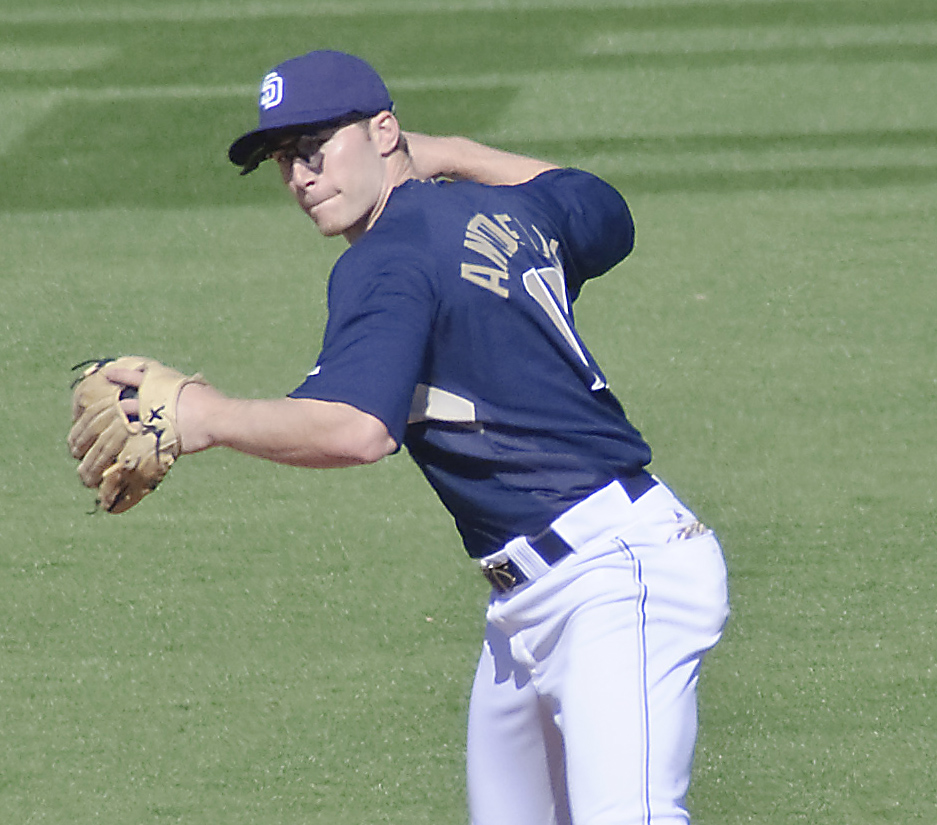
- Antonelli with the San Diego Padres in 2010

Boston College Eagles
- Second baseman
- Born: April 8, 1985 (age 41); Peabody, Massachusetts, U.S.
- Batted: Right Threw: Right

MLB debut
- September 1, 2008, for the San Diego Padres

Last MLB appearance
- September 28, 2008, for the San Diego Padres

MLB statistics
- Batting average: .193
- Home runs: 1
- Runs batted in: 3
- Stats at Baseball Reference

Teams
- San Diego Padres (2008)

Matthew Antonio Antonelli (born April 8, 1985) is an American former professional baseball second baseman who played in Major League Baseball (MLB) for the San Diego Padres in 2008. He is currently a baseball coach and host of a YouTube channel of baseball instructional videos and discussions about his time in the major leagues.

== Early life ==
During his senior year at St. John's Prep in Danvers, Massachusetts, Antonelli was named the Massachusetts High School Player of the Year in football and hockey and runner-up in baseball, and was selected to the all-state team in hockey. He was drafted in the 19th round (571st overall) of the 2003 Major League Baseball draft by the Los Angeles Dodgers. He did not sign and instead chose to play college baseball at Wake Forest, where he displayed good plate discipline, walking 57 times as a sophomore. He only struck out 38 times in 232 at-bats, giving him one of the best strikeout-to-walk ratios in the nation. In 2004 and 2005, he played collegiate summer baseball with the Falmouth Commodores of the Cape Cod Baseball League and was named a league all-star in both seasons.

== Professional career ==
=== San Diego Padres ===
Antonelli was drafted as a third baseman by the San Diego Padres with the 17th pick in the first round of the 2006 Major League Baseball draft. In July 2007, Antonelli was named the best second base prospect in the minor leagues by Kevin Goldstein of Baseball Prospectus.

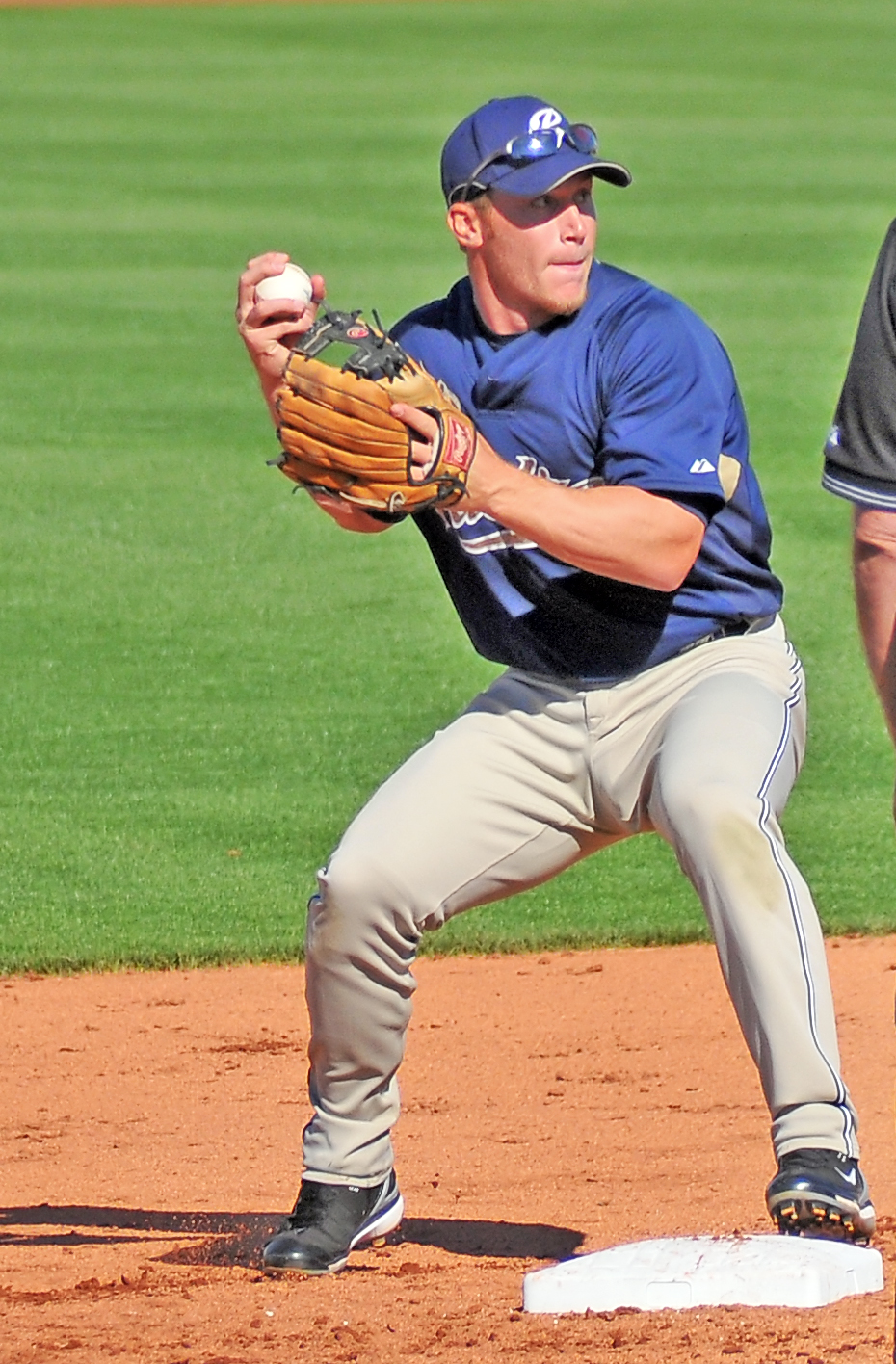
Antonelli with the Padres in spring training in 2008

In 2006, he hit 14 home runs in 82 games for High-A Lake Elsinore, before moving up to the AA San Antonio Missions to finish the season. In 534 at-bats between the two levels, Antonelli finished with a slash line of .304/.404/.491 with 21 home runs and 25 stolen bases along with a 94/83 K/BB ratio. He won the Texas League Championship with the Missions in 2007.

In 2008, Antonelli was called up to the major leagues for the San Diego Padres and on September 1, 2008, he promptly laced a single off Greg Maddux of the Los Angeles Dodgers for his first hit in the major leagues. He then went hitless in his next 20 at bats, but then got 7 hits in his next 13 at-bats with three walks, including his first home run, on September 15, off of Colorado Rockies pitcher Jason Hirsh.

During spring training in 2010, he suffered a hamate bone injury and then a broken wrist, requiring multiple surgeries. While the club kept him on the official roster he was unable to play, and was granted free agency at the end of the 2010 season. The hand injuries became a chronic issue throughout the rest of his career.

=== Washington Nationals ===
Antonelli signed as a minor league free agent with the Washington Nationals on December 17, 2010 and spent the season with the AA Harrisburg Senators and AAA Syracuse Chiefs. His wrist injury recurred with a handful of games remaining in the season and he left the team shortly after the conclusion of the season.

=== Baltimore Orioles ===
On November 21, 2011, Antonelli signed with the Baltimore Orioles. He was then added to the team's 40-man roster. On May 13, 2012, the Orioles designated him for assignment.

=== New York Yankees ===
On May 17, the New York Yankees claimed Antonelli off waivers from the Orioles. He was designated for assignment on July 1 and released on July 5. His wrist injury woes continued, preventing him from playing a significant amount of game time.

=== Cleveland Indians ===
Antonelli signed a minor league contract with the Cleveland Indians in January 2013. He played through spring training, and was sent down afterwards to the AAA Columbus Clippers. Later in the season, the Indians informed Antonelli they were going to release him from the team. After receiving minor interest from independent baseball teams he retired on July 17 to take up coaching.

== Post-playing career ==
After retiring, Antonelli received several calls from independent league teams. However, he declined all of those offers due to his injury history and his belief he could not make it back to the Major Leagues, and decided to focus on a potential career of coaching.

Antonelli has a YouTube channel, Antonelli Baseball, for which he makes baseball-related videos. He also has an MLB: The Show series on his channel where he plays the game's Road to the Show mode. The channel has more than 276,000 subscribers and over 136 million views as of August 2025.

He also served as an assistant baseball coach at Holy Cross and his alma mater Wake Forest.

In June 2025, Antonelli was named the head baseball coach at Gordon College in Wenham, Massachusetts.

He is married to Laura, with whom he has two children, Matthew and Mia.

On September 28, 2026, Matt was hired to become Boston College assistant coach of the baseball team.
