= Bryan Corey =

American baseball player (born 1973)

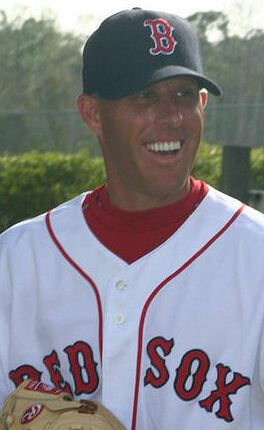
- Relief pitcher
- Born: October 21, 1973 (age 52); Thousand Oaks, California, U.S.
- Batted: Right Threw: Right

Professional debut
- MLB: May 13, 1998, for the Arizona Diamondbacks
- NPB: June 22, 2004, for the Yomiuri Giants
- KBO: April 2, 2011, for the Lotte Giants
- CPBL: September 4, 2011, for the Lotte Giants

Last appearance
- MLB: August 9, 2008, for the San Diego Padres
- NPB: September 28, 2009, for the Chiba Lotte Marines
- KBO: July 8, 2011, for the Lotte Giants

MLB statistics
- Win–loss record: 4–4
- Earned run average: 5.13
- Strikeouts: 57

NPB statistics
- Win–loss record: 5–5
- Earned run average: 5.08
- Strikeouts: 47

KBO statistics
- Win–loss record: 4–3
- Earned run average: 4.23
- Strikeouts: 48

CPBL statistics
- Win–loss record: 2–1
- Earned run average: 4.37
- Strikeouts: 15
- Stats at Baseball Reference

Teams
- Arizona Diamondbacks (1998); Los Angeles Dodgers (2002); Yomiuri Giants (2004); Texas Rangers (2006); Boston Red Sox (2006–2008); San Diego Padres (2008); Chiba Lotte Marines (2010); Lotte Giants (2011); Lamigo Monkeys (2011)

Career highlights and awards
- World Series champion (2007)

Bryan Scott Corey (born October 21, 1973) is an American former professional baseball right-handed relief pitcher who played in Major League Baseball (MLB), Nippon Professional Baseball (NPB), the KBO League, and the Chinese Professional Baseball League (CPBL) during his career. He is currently a pitching coach in the Oakland Athletics minor league organization.

== Playing career ==
Originally selected by the Detroit Tigers in the 12th round of the 1993 Major League Baseball draft, he was converted from a position player to a pitcher by the Tigers in 1995. Corey would make his Major League Baseball debut with the Arizona Diamondbacks after being selected 63rd in the expansion draft.

After his short spell with the Diamondbacks in 1998, Corey became a Triple-A journeyman, playing for Triple-A affiliates of the Arizona Diamondbacks (1999), Detroit Tigers (1999), Oakland Athletics (2000), San Diego Padres (2001), Los Angeles Dodgers (2002–2003), Chicago Cubs (2004), Florida Marlins (2005), Texas Rangers (2006), and Boston Red Sox (2006-2008). In addition, he pitched in the Japan Central League with the Yomiuri Giants in 2004.

On June 19, 2006, Corey had his contract purchased by the Texas Rangers to pitch in the bullpen, but was designated for assignment by the Rangers on July 25, 2006, after posting a 1–1 record with an ERA of 2.60. On July 30, 2006, Corey was traded to the Red Sox for minor league pitcher Luis Mendoza, but he was again designated for assignment after pitching 1 inning for the Red Sox, giving up a solo home run. He returned to the Red Sox for spring training in 2007 and went 0–1 with a 1.50 ERA in 12 innings, but was not selected to be part of the 25-man roster. However, he was called up on September 1 when rosters expanded. On April 14, 2008, Corey was again designated for assignment by the Red Sox. On April 17, Corey declined an outright assignment to Triple-A and became a free agent. On April 22, 2008, Corey resigned with the Red Sox to a minor league contract. On April 25, 2008, the Red Sox purchased his contract from the Triple-A Pawtucket. He was once again designated for assignment on April 29. On May 11, 2008, Corey was traded to the San Diego Padres for a PTBNL or cash considerations. He became a free agent at the end of the season and signed a minor league contract with the Texas Rangers in February 2009.

== Coaching career ==
In 2017, Corey served as the pitching coach for the Oakland Athletics' Vermont Lake Monsters of the Low-A New York–Penn League. He was promoted to the same position with their High-A California League Stockton Ports for 2018.
