= Cha-seung Baek =

Korean baseball player (born 1980)

Cha Seung Baek 백차승
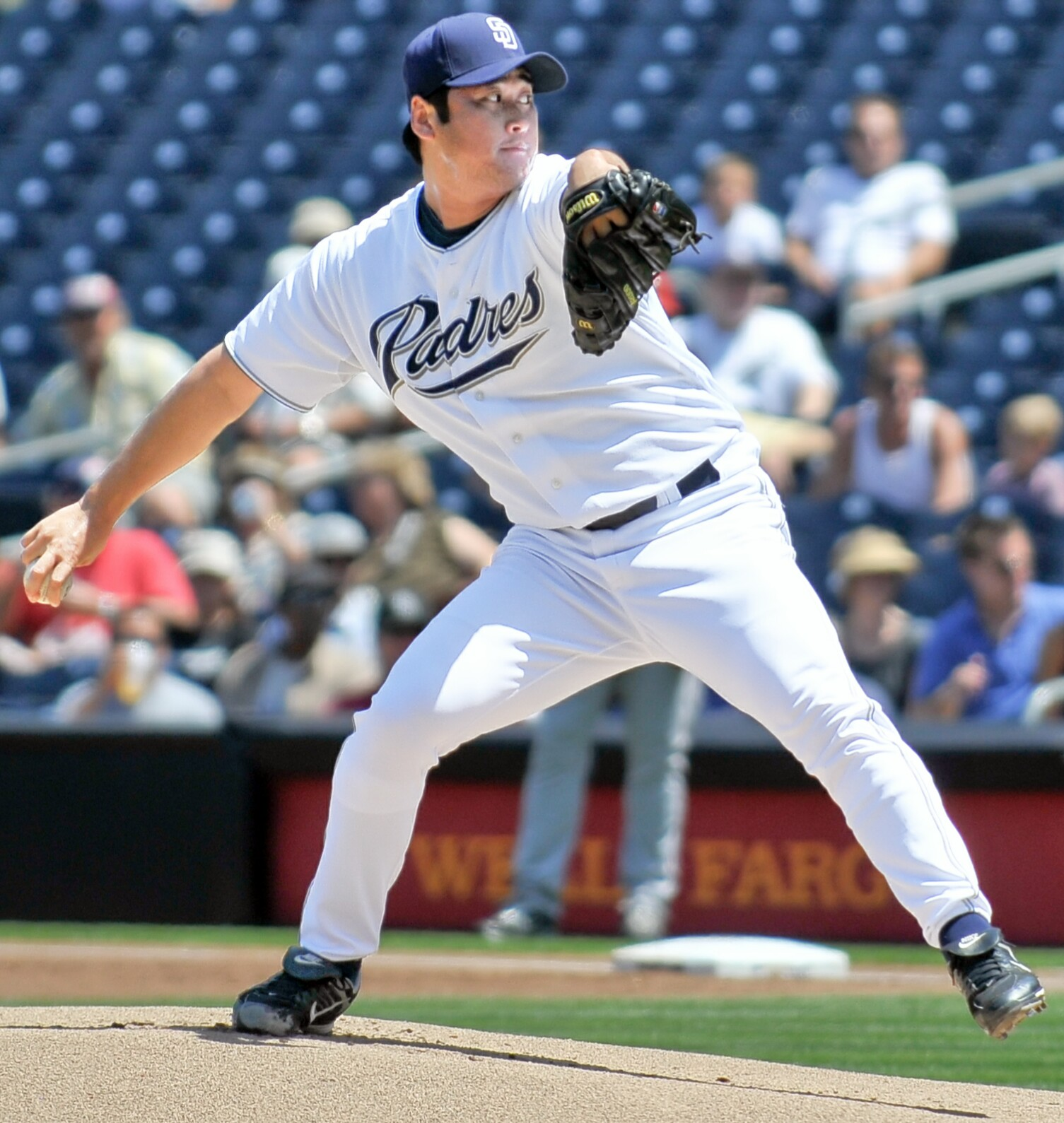
- Baek with the San Diego Padres
- Pitcher
- Born: May 29, 1980 (age 46); Busan, South Korea
- Batted: Right Threw: Right

MLB debut
- August 8, 2004, for the Seattle Mariners

Last MLB appearance
- September 28, 2008, for the San Diego Padres

MLB statistics
- Win–loss record: 16–18
- Earned run average: 4.83
- Strikeouts: 184
- Stats at Baseball Reference

Teams
- Seattle Mariners (2004, 2006–2008); San Diego Padres (2008)

- Cha-seung Baek
- Hangul: 백차승
- Hanja: 白蹉承
- RR: Baek Chaseung
- MR: Paek Ch'asŭng

Cha Seung Baek (/ˌtʃaʊ ˌsʌŋ ˈbɛk/, Korean: 백차승; Hanja: 白蹉承, [pɛ̝k.tɕʰa.sɯŋ]; born May 29, 1980) is a Korean former professional baseball pitcher. He played in Major League Baseball (MLB) for the Seattle Mariners and San Diego Padres.

Baek graduated from Busan High School in Busan, South Korea in 1998. He was signed by the Seattle Mariners as an amateur free agent on September 25, 1998.

== Professional career ==
=== Seattle Mariners ===
Baek made his professional debut with the Peoria Mariners in 1999. In his first start he struck out 8 batters over 5 innings on July 18. Baek was 4–1 with a 3.86 ERA in 9 home starts with Wisconsin Timber Rattlers in 2000. He was placed on the disabled list on June 2 with a right arm flexor strain. Baek went 5–3 after coming off the DL June 15. At the end of the season he was listed among Baseball America's top-20 Midwest League prospects at the end of the season.

Baek spent most season on the San Bernardino Stampede's disabled list. He made 2 starts before being placed on the DL from April 13 to May 14 with soreness in his right elbow. He pitched in 3 games, 2 starts in May before suffering a strained right elbow in his final start of the season in May. He had elbow ligament surgery, ending his season.

Baek missed the entire 2002 season after undergoing right elbow surgery. He participated in the Mariners Fall Instructional League.

He split the 2003 season between the Inland Empire 66ers and the San Antonio Missions. He started the season with Inland Empire appearing in 13 games, 10 starts. From April 19 to the 24 he pitched 10 scoreless innings in two starts. Baek won three consecutive starts from April 19 to the 30. Placed on the disabled list from May 8 to June 10 with a right elbow inflammation. On July 17 he was transferred to San Antonio. He carried a no-hitter into the eighth inning, retiring 21 of the first 22 batters faced, before allowing a single, on July 23.

He made his MLB debut on August 8, 2004 against the Tampa Bay Devil Rays. In the 2004 season, he pitched in seven games (starting five), winning two and losing four, and had a 5.52 ERA overall. He was one of 15 players to make their Major League debuts for Seattle this season.

Baek was non-tendered by the Mariners in December 2005 following a disappointing year in Triple-A with the Tacoma Rainiers. He returned to the Rainiers for the 2006 season. He posted an 11–4 record with a 2.80 ERA, which earned him a recall to the Mariners in August 2006, following their trade of Jamie Moyer to the Philadelphia Phillies. After that, he was moved to being a relief pitcher and spot starter for the Mariners.

=== San Diego Padres ===
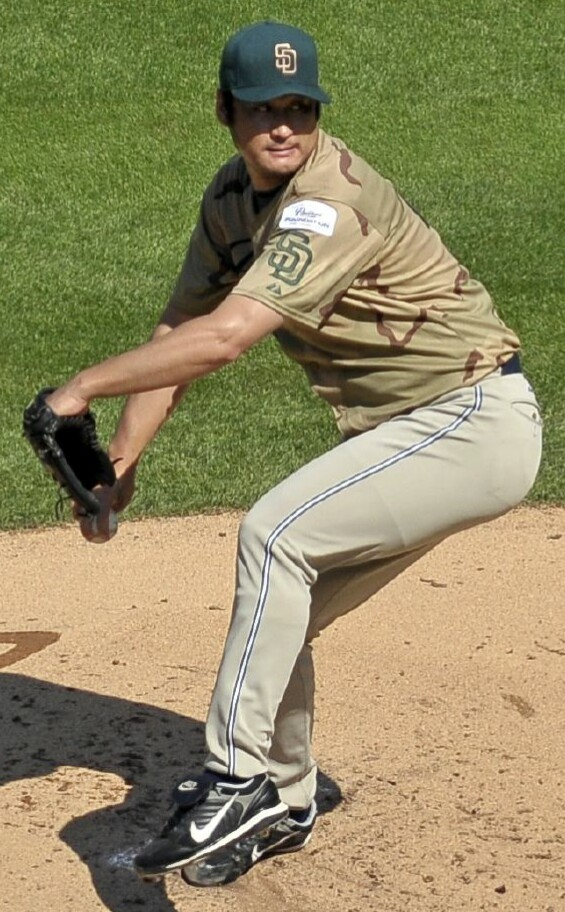
Baek pitching for the San Diego Padres in 2008

In May 2007, Baek was designated for assignment by the Mariners. Later in the month, he was traded to the San Diego Padres for Jared Wells. Baek hit his first career home run on July 20, 2008, off Jaime Garcia.

On October 8, 2009, the Padres released Baek.

=== Orix Buffaloes ===
On November 14, 2011, Baek signed with the Orix Buffaloes of Nippon Professional Baseball. However, he didn't play any games on the main team but appeared in 9 games on the farm throwing 29.2 innings going 2-4 with a 4.25 ERA and 21 strikeouts.

Baek was released by the Buffaloes on October 5, 2012.

=== Chiba Lotte Marines ===
Baek signed with the Chiba Lotte Marines of Nippon Professional Baseball for the 2015 season. He only appeared on the farm team appearing in 4 games 13.2 innings going 1-0 with a 3.95 ERA and 8 strikeouts.
