= Callix Crabbe =

Virgin Islands American baseball player/coach (born 1983)

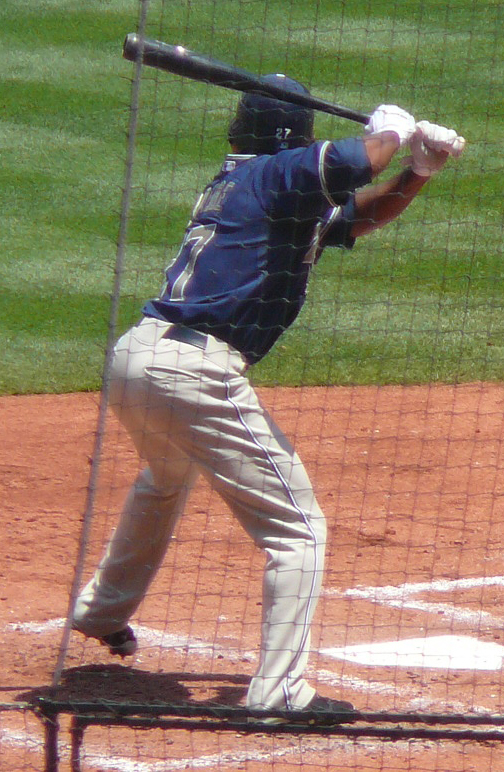
- Crabbe with the Padres in 2008
- Second baseman / Hitting coach
- Born: February 14, 1983 (age 43); Saint Thomas, U.S. Virgin Islands
- Batted: Switch Threw: Right

MLB debut
- April 3, 2008, for the San Diego Padres

Last MLB appearance
- May 8, 2008, for the San Diego Padres

MLB statistics
- Batting average: .176
- Home runs: 0
- Runs batted in: 2
- Stats at Baseball Reference

Teams
- As player: San Diego Padres (2008); As coach: Texas Rangers (2019–2021)

Callix Sadeaq Crabbe (born February 14, 1983) is a Virgin Islands American former professional baseball second baseman and current coach in the Pittsburgh Pirates organization. He played in Major League Baseball (MLB) for the San Diego Padres. He was the assistant hitting coach for the Texas Rangers from 2019 through 2021.

== Playing career ==
Crabbe was drafted out of Stone Mountain High School in Stone Mountain, Georgia, by the Atlanta Braves in the 32nd round of the 2000 Major League Baseball draft but did not sign. He attended Young Harris College for one season, before transferring to State College of Florida, Manatee-Sarasota.

=== Milwaukee Brewers ===
Crabbe was drafted by the Milwaukee Brewers in the 12th round, with the 349th overall selection, of the 2002 Major League Baseball draft and signed with the team.

Crabbe began the 2002 season with the Brewers' rookie–level affiliate, the Ogden Raptors. He advanced in 2003 to the Single–A Beloit Snappers, in 2004 to the High–A High Desert Mavericks, and to the Double–A Huntsville Stars in 2005, where he also played in 2006. In 2007, Crabbe was promoted to the Brewers' Triple–A affiliate, the Nashville Sounds. With Nashville, he led the team in games played (130), at-bats (457), hits (131), runs scored (84), triples (9), stolen bases (17), and walks (67).

=== San Diego Padres ===
On December 6, 2007, the San Diego Padres selected Crabbe in the Rule 5 Draft. He made his major league debut on April 3, 2008. Crabbe played in 21 games for the Padres in 2008. In 34 at–bats, he scored four runs on six hits and had two RBI. Crabbe also had six strikeouts, walked four times, and compiled a .176 batting average. He was designated for assignment by San Diego on May 12.

=== Milwaukee Brewers (second stint) ===
Crabbe was returned to the Milwaukee Brewers organization on May 16, 2008. Upon returning to Milwaukee's organization, Crabbe was assigned to the Triple-A Nashville Sounds. He became a free agent after the 2008 season.

=== Seattle Mariners ===
On December 4, 2008, Crabbe signed a minor league contract with the Seattle Mariners organization. In 111 appearances split between the Double-A West Tenn Diamond Jaxx and Triple-A Tacoma Rainiers, he batted .211/.316/.298 with three home runs, 33 RBI, and seven stolen bases. Crabbe elected free agency following the season on November 9, 2009.

=== Toronto Blue Jays ===
On March 24, 2010, Crabbe signed a minor league contract with the Toronto Blue Jays. He split the year between the Double-A New Hampshire Fisher Cats and Triple-A Las Vegas 51s, playing in 91 total games and hitting .222/.312/.318 with four home runs, 30 RBI, and 20 stolen bases.

Crabbe spent 2011 back with New Hampshire, playing in 69 games and slashing .259/.348/.405 with seven home runs, 31 RBI, and nine stolen bases. He elected free agency following the season on November 2, 2011.

== Coaching career ==
After his playing career ended, Crabbe went in to coaching. His roles included, head varsity baseball coach for IMG Academy from 2012 to 2015 and baseball instructor at the IMG Academy from 2012 to 2015. Crabbe also ran his own baseball instructional program called Crabbe-ology Sports Development starting in November 2015. Crabbe-ology consulted with many major league hitters over the years in operation. Crabbe also worked for The positive coaching alliance a non-profit organization focused on educating administrators, coaches, parents and players on the core principles needed for a great sporting environment with a focus on growth and development across the eco-system.

On December 4, 2018, Crabbe was hired as the assistant hitting coach of the Texas Rangers. He served in that role for the 2019, 2020, and 2021 seasons.

Crabbe was named the manager of the Greensboro Grasshoppers and assistant hitting coordinator for the Pittsburgh Pirates prior to the 2022 season. He managed the Altoona Curve in 2023.

== Awards ==
In 2004, while playing for the High Desert Mavericks, he was named the best defensive second baseman in the California League.

In 2007, while playing for the Nashville Sounds, he was named the Applebee's "Home Team Hero of the Year." The award recognizes players for their participation in community outreach during the season.

== Personal life ==
Crabbe resides in Tampa, Florida, with his wife, Amanda, and two children, Calyx and Alana.

Due to a printing error, Carlos Guevara appeared on one of Crabbe's baseball cards.

== See also ==
- Rule 5 draft results
