= Paul McAnulty =

American baseball player (born 1981)

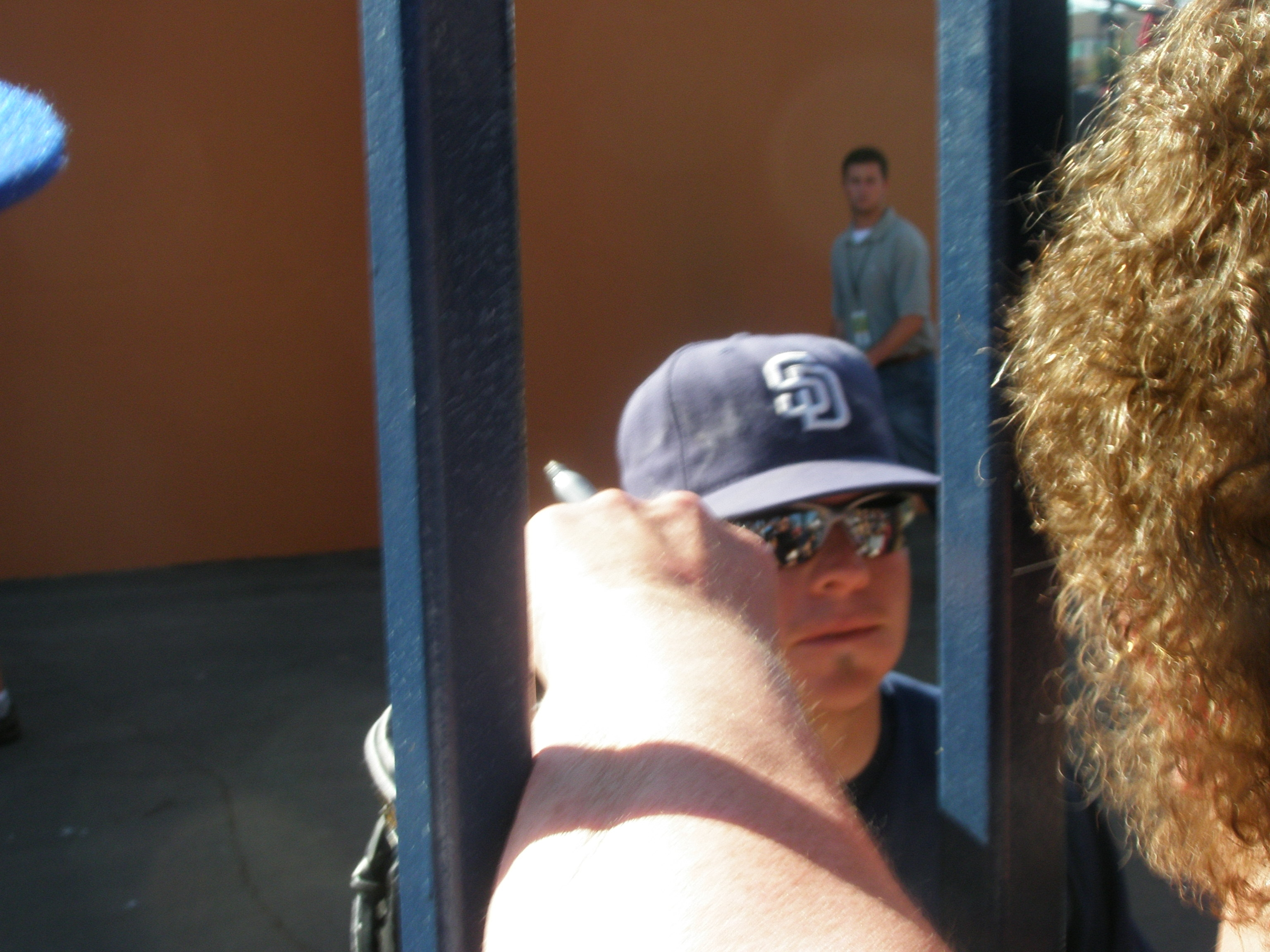
- McAnulty with the San Diego Padres
- Outfielder
- Born: February 24, 1981 (age 45); Oxnard, California, U.S.
- Batted: Left Threw: Right

MLB debut
- June 22, 2005, for the San Diego Padres

Last MLB appearance
- July 18, 2010, for the Los Angeles Angels of Anaheim

MLB statistics
- Batting average: .201
- Home runs: 6
- Runs batted in: 23
- Stats at Baseball Reference

Teams
- San Diego Padres (2005–2008); Los Angeles Angels of Anaheim (2010)

Paul Michael McAnulty (born February 24, 1981) is an American former Major League Baseball outfielder. He played college baseball at Long Beach State.

== Major League Baseball ==
=== San Diego Padres ===
McAnulty gained the attention of San Diego Padres GM Kevin Towers when he batted .344 for the Triple-A Portland Beavers in 2005, which led to his major league debut on June 22, 2005. Drawing comparisons with former Padre and Phillie great John Kruk, he was mainly used as a pinch hitter, or called up when one of the starting outfielders was injured.

On September 6, 2006, he made a nice impression on Padres fans with a pinch hit, walk-off home run in the 11th inning versus the Colorado Rockies. During the 2008 season, he had a stint where he was a starting outfielder on the depleted San Diego roster.

=== Boston Red Sox ===
On November 19, 2008, he signed a minor league deal with the Boston Red Sox.

On July 24, 2009, the Red Sox announced his release after only hitting .233 with Pawtucket.

=== Colorado Rockies ===
On August 10, 2009, McAnulty signed a minor league contract with the Colorado Rockies. In November 2009, McAnutly filed for Free Agency.

=== Los Angeles Angels of Anaheim ===
McAnulty joined the Los Angeles Angels of Anaheim organization in 2010, playing the majority of the year at their Triple-A club, the Salt Lake Bees. He received some playing time at the Major League level with the Angels, hitting one home run in 24 plate appearances.

He started the 2011 season with the Salt Lake Bees, and on July 22, 2012, he was sent to the Arkansas Travelers, the Angels Double-A club.

=== Coaching career ===
Paul was the hitting coach for the Burlington Bees, a Class A minor league baseball team for the Los Angeles Angels, for the 2014 season. He was the co-hitting coach for AZL League Angels 2015 and 2016 seasons. As of 2019, Paul is the hitting coach of the South Bend Cubs.
