= Josh Banks =

American baseball player (born 1982)

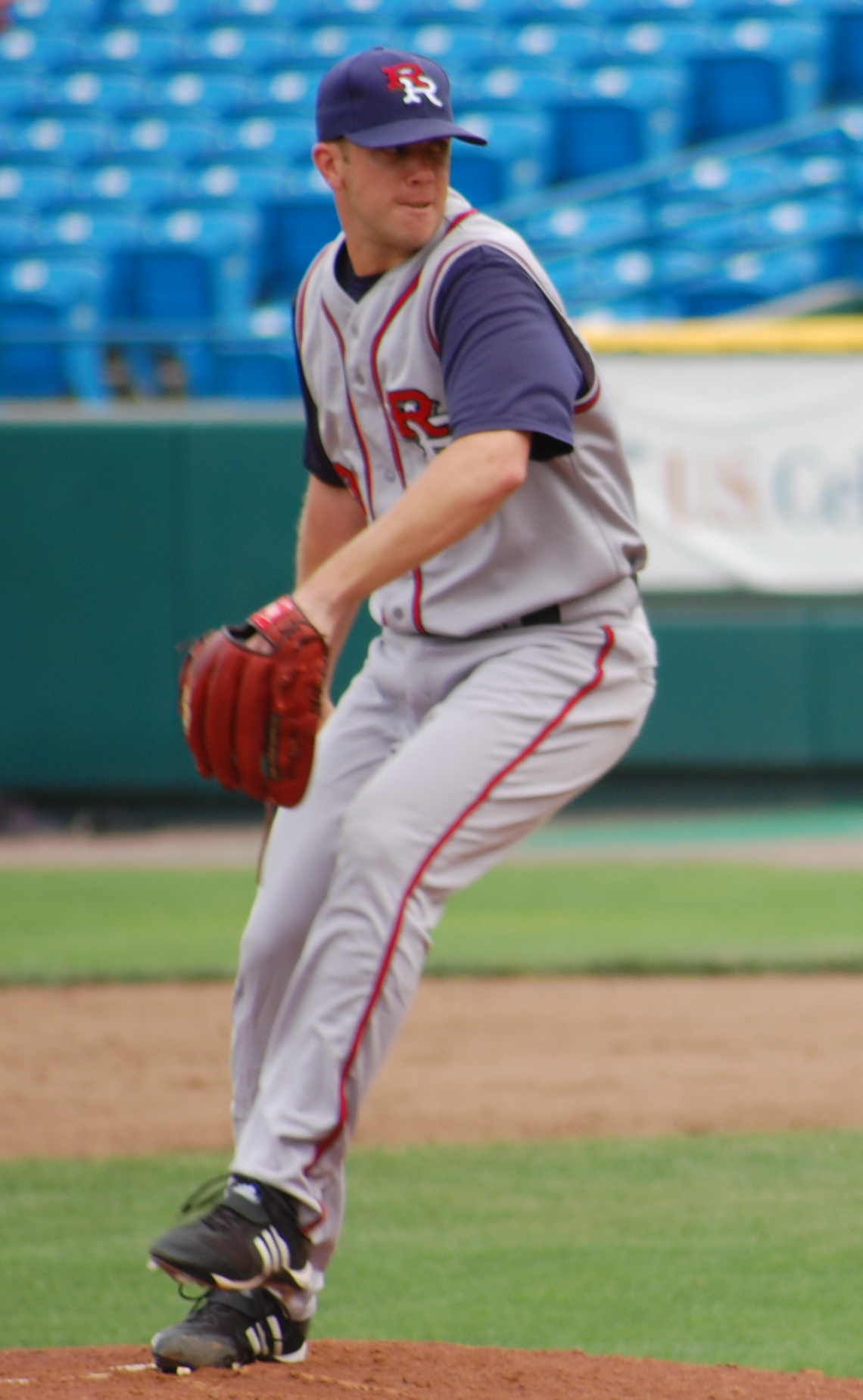
- Banks pitching for the Round Rock Express, triple-A affiliates of the Houston Astros, in 2010
- Pitcher
- Born: July 18, 1982 (age 44); Baltimore, Maryland, U.S.
- Batted: Right Threw: Right

MLB debut
- September 11, 2007, for the Toronto Blue Jays

Last MLB appearance
- June 26, 2010, for the Houston Astros

MLB statistics
- Win–loss record: 4–8
- Earned run average: 5.66
- Strikeouts: 55
- Stats at Baseball Reference

Teams
- Toronto Blue Jays (2007); San Diego Padres (2008–2009); Houston Astros (2010)

Joshua Charles Banks (born July 18, 1982) is an American former professional baseball pitcher who played in Major League Baseball (MLB) between 2007 and 2010 for the Toronto Blue Jays, San Diego Padres, and Houston Astros. He is 6'3" tall and weighs 195 pounds. Banks attended college at Florida International University. Tony Gwynn said Banks has eight pitches, one of which is a knuckleball.

== Career ==
Banks played college baseball at Florida International University. In 2002, he played collegiate summer baseball with the Cotuit Kettleers of the Cape Cod Baseball League and was named a league all-star.

He was selected by the Toronto Blue Jays in the second round of the 2003 Major League Baseball draft. Banks Major League debut in 2007 with the Blue Jays. On April 23, 2008, Banks was claimed off waivers by the San Diego Padres.

In his first 22 innings as a Padre, he did not give up any runs. This string was broken when David Wright singled home José Reyes on June 5, 2008. His first loss came weeks later against the New York Yankees and Joba Chamberlain on June 19, 2008. The loss was part of a three-game sweep of the Padres at Yankee Stadium, the last time the San Diego Padres ever visited the old Yankee Stadium. In October 2009, Banks was granted Free Agency.

On January 4, 2010, Banks signed a minor league contract with the Houston Astros and got an invitation to spring training. He appeared in 27 games for the Round Rock Express and one game for the Astros before becoming a free agent at the end of the season.

On January 31, 2011, Banks signed a major league contract with the San Francisco Giants. He was released during the season.

On February 28, 2012, Banks signed a major league contract with the Baltimore Orioles. Banks, who also pitched for the Long Island Ducks last year, has Gary Sheffield for an agent. On March 31, 2012, he was released by the Orioles.

== Personal life ==
He has two daughters Lola, and Olivia and is married to Casey Banks.
