= Chad Reineke =

American baseball player (born 1982)

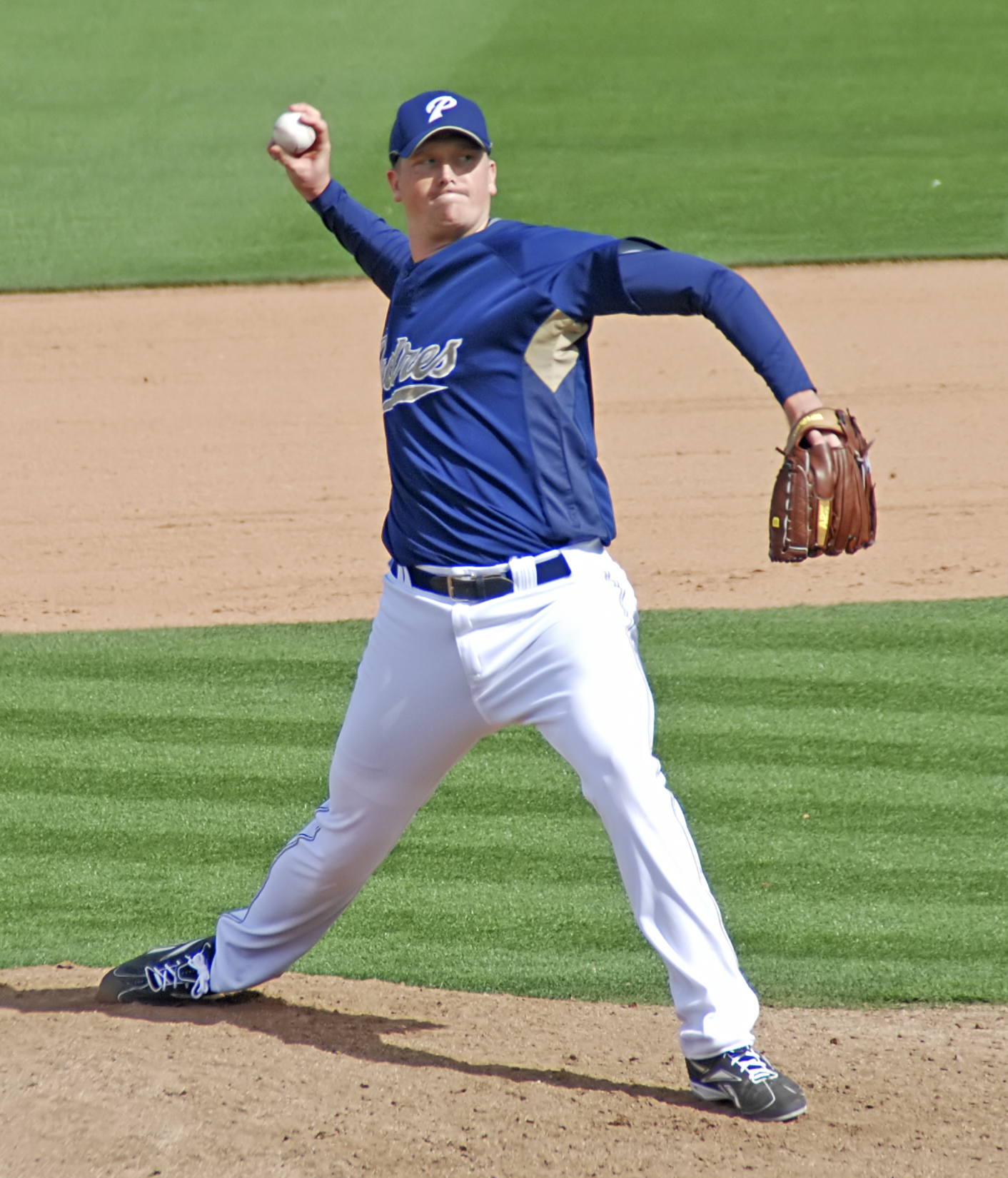
- Reineke with the San Diego Padres
- Pitcher
- Born: April 9, 1982 (age 44); Defiance, Ohio, U.S.
- Batted: Right Threw: Right

MLB debut
- August 16, 2008, for the San Diego Padres

Last MLB appearance
- June 5, 2011, for the Cincinnati Reds

MLB statistics
- Win–loss record: 2–2
- Earned run average: 5.76
- Strikeouts: 17
- Stats at Baseball Reference

Teams
- San Diego Padres (2008); Oakland Athletics (2009); Cincinnati Reds (2011)

Chad Karl Reineke (born April 9, 1982) is an American former professional baseball pitcher. He played in Major League Baseball (MLB) for the San Diego Padres, Oakland Athletics, and Cincinnati Reds.

== Personal life ==
Reineke attended Ayersville High School. He married long-time girlfriend Kelli Battershell on November 7, 2009.

== College career ==
Reineke attended Miami University in which he played college ball. For the RedHawks, he was mainly used as a relief pitcher, but would make the occasional start. His best season for the RedHawks came in 2001, when he made five starts and eight relief appearances, notching a 2–2 record with a 4.22 ERA.

== Professional career ==
Reineke was drafted by the Houston Astros in the 13th round (394th overall) of the 2004 Major League Baseball draft.

=== Houston Astros ===
After signing with the Astros on June 16, 2004, Reineke was assigned to the Single-A Tri-City ValleyCats. For the ValleyCats, he pitched in 23 games, all in relief, and had a 1–2 record with a 2.45 ERA and 3 saves. Reineke advanced one level in 2005, playing the entire season for the Single-A Lexington Legends. He was both a starter and a reliever for the Legends, making 11 starts and 31 relief appearances. Reineke finished the season 10–8 with a 3.52 ERA and 4 saves.

In 2006, Reineke played at two levels, the Single-A Salem Avalanche and the Double-A Corpus Christi Hooks. For the Avalanche, he was in their starting rotation, making 17 starts and posting a 6–5 record with a 2.98 ERA. For the Hooks, he was primarily used as a reliever, playing in a total of 15 games and getting a 1–3 record with a 3.05 ERA.

Reineke advanced another level in 2007, this time playing at the Triple-A level for the Round Rock Express. Making 16 starts and the same number of relief appearances, Reineke went a combined 5–5 with a 4.68 ERA.

On November 20, 2007, Reineke's contract was purchased, protecting him from the Rule 5 draft.

=== San Diego Padres ===
On July 22, 2008, he was traded to the San Diego Padres for Randy Wolf. On August 16, 2008, Reineke made his Major League debut as the starting pitcher for the Padres against the Philadelphia Phillies. He pitched five innings, giving up three runs, getting the win, and also going 1 for 2 at the plate with an RBI single. He earned his second win by defeating Brandon Webb, who was seeking his 20th win of the season.

=== Oakland Athletics ===
Before the 2009 minor league baseball season began, Reineke was traded to the Oakland Athletics for outfielder J. D. Pruitt. Reineke has played for the A's Triple-A farm team, the Sacramento River Cats. He was called up to make an emergency start for the A's on August 5, 2009, and returned to Sacramento the next day. In November 2009, Reineke was granted free agency.

=== Cincinnati Reds ===
On December 22, 2009, Reineke signed a minor league contract with the Cincinnati Reds. He spent the entire 2010 season with their Triple-A affiliate, the Louisville Bats. On November 24, 2010, Reineke re-signed with the Reds organization on a new minor league contract.

He had his contract purchased by the Reds on May 31, 2011. He started that night against Milwaukee in place of the injured Homer Bailey. He was designated for assignment after one start for the Reds, presumably to clear a roster space for another player. On October 10, he elected free agency. He re-signed a minor league contract with the Reds on November 28. He was released by the Louisville Bats on June 1, 2014.
