= Randy Wolf =

American baseball player (born 1976)

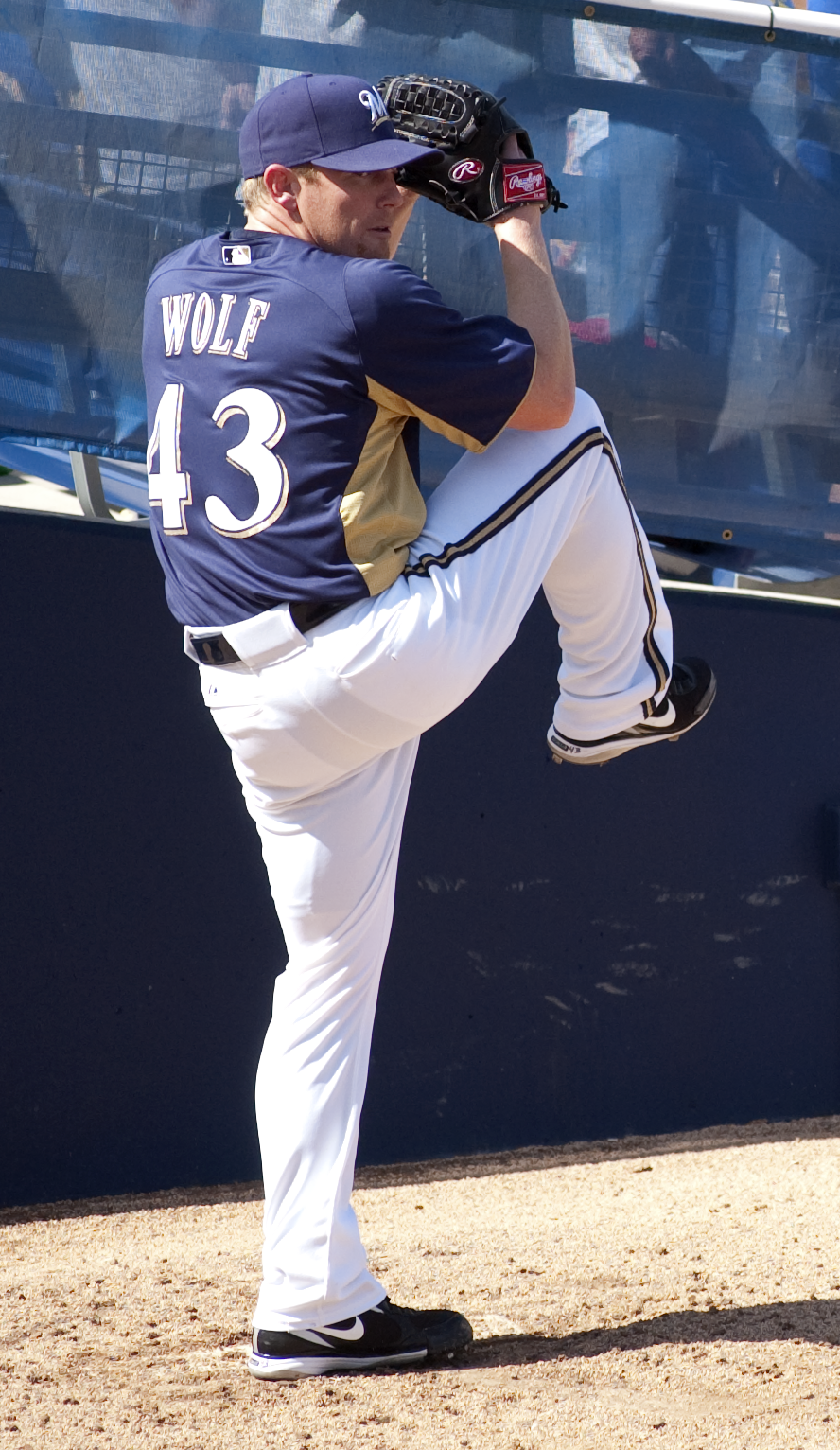
- Wolf with the Milwaukee Brewers
- Pitcher
- Born: August 22, 1976 (age 50); West Hills, California, U.S.
- Batted: Left Threw: Left

MLB debut
- June 11, 1999, for the Philadelphia Phillies

Last MLB appearance
- October 4, 2015, for the Detroit Tigers

MLB statistics
- Win–loss record: 133–125
- Earned run average: 4.24
- Strikeouts: 1,814
- Stats at Baseball Reference

Teams
- Philadelphia Phillies (1999–2006); Los Angeles Dodgers (2007); San Diego Padres (2008); Houston Astros (2008); Los Angeles Dodgers (2009); Milwaukee Brewers (2010–2012); Baltimore Orioles (2012); Miami Marlins (2014); Detroit Tigers (2015)

Career highlights and awards
- All-Star (2003)
Medals
Men's baseball
Representing United States
World Junior Baseball Championship
Silver medal – second place	1994 Brandon	Team

Randall Christopher Wolf (born August 22, 1976), nicknamed "Wolfie", is an American former professional baseball pitcher. He played in Major League Baseball (MLB) for the Philadelphia Phillies, Los Angeles Dodgers, San Diego Padres, Houston Astros, Milwaukee Brewers, Miami Marlins, and Detroit Tigers.

Wolf graduated from El Camino Real in Woodland Hills, California. He was drafted by the Dodgers in 1994, but he did not sign. He played college baseball for Pepperdine University and then was drafted by the Phillies in 1997. He made his MLB debut in 1999. In 2003, Wolf was selected to the Major League Baseball All-Star Game.

== Early life ==
Wolf was born on August 22, 1976, in Canoga Park, California. He played PONY League Baseball in West Hills, California. He played high school baseball at El Camino Real in Woodland Hills, California, where he was named High School "Pitcher of the Year" by the Los Angeles Times in 1993, and "Player of the Year" in 1994. Wolf continued his amateur career at Pepperdine University where he was a freshman first-team All-America, West Coast Conference Pitcher of the Year, second-team college All-American, and a West Coast Conference All-Star.

== Draft and minor leagues ==
Wolf was originally drafted by the Los Angeles Dodgers in the 25th round of the 1994 Major League Baseball draft, but did not sign. He was then drafted by the Philadelphia Phillies in the second round of the 1997 Major League Baseball draft. He rose through the minor leagues quickly, including stops with Single-A Batavia (1997, 4–0, 1.58, 7 starts), Double-A Reading (1998, 2–0, 1.44, 4 starts), and Triple-A Scranton/Wilkes-Barre (1998, 9–7, 4.62, 23 starts & 1999, 4–5, 3.61, 12 starts).

== Major league career ==
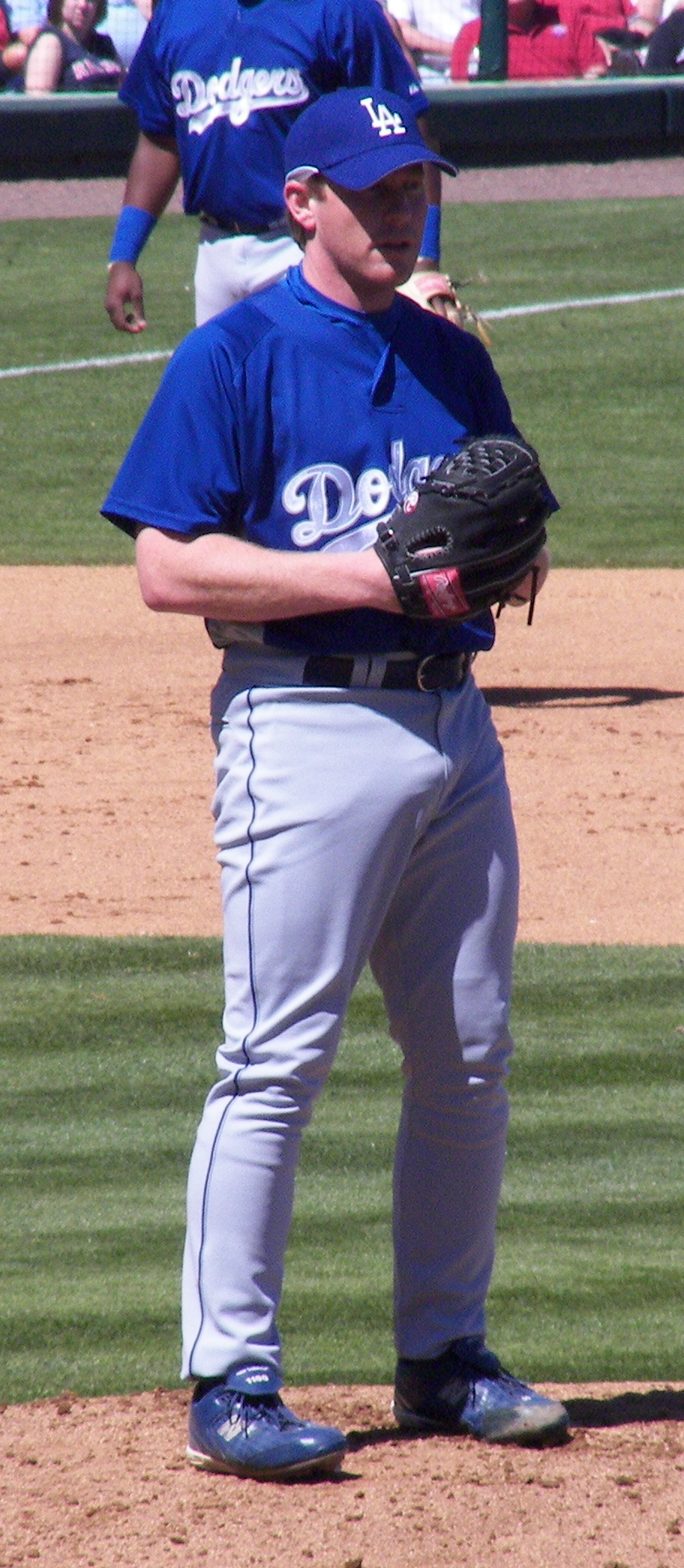
Wolf pitching for the Dodgers in Spring 2007.

=== Philadelphia Phillies ===
Wolf made his major-league debut on June 11, 1999, against the Toronto Blue Jays, pitching 5 2/3 innings, giving up one run, and recording his first career victory in the Phillies 8–4 win over Toronto. He finished his first season with a 6–9 record and a 5.55 ERA.

In his second season, Wolf was embedded in the rotation and was a mainstay the entire season, going 11–9 in 32 starts. He followed the next couple of seasons winning 10 and 11 games respectively in the years 2001 and 2002.

In 2003, Wolf was selected to the National League All-Star team and finished the year with a career-high 16 wins. On August 11, 2004, Wolf hit two home runs while pitching the Phillies to a 15–4 win against the Colorado Rockies. On July 1, 2005, Wolf underwent Tommy John surgery, missing the remainder of the season and the first half of the 2006 season. He made his return to the Phillies' rotation on July 30, 2006. He finished the 2006 season with a 4–0 record, pitching only 55 innings. During his time with the Phillies, Wolf was supported at every home start by a fan group, “The Wolf Pack,” founded by eight Wood brothers and their four cousins. Their "pack leader" Patrick Wood was the spokes person for the group. The group, sporting wolf masks, assembled in the typically empty upper deck of Veterans Stadium and celebrated Wolf strikeouts by howling and dancing. Wolf befriended members of the group and kept in contact even after leaving the Phillies in 2006. The Wolf Pack returned to Citizens Bank Park in 2016 for Wolf's retirement ceremony and performed a dance on top of the Phillies dugout with the Phillie Phanatic. After the 2006 season Wolf's contract with the Phillies expired and he became a free agent.

=== Los Angeles Dodgers ===
Wolf signed as a free agent with the Los Angeles Dodgers. Wolf started 18 games, going 9–6. On July 4, 2007, Wolf went on the 15-day disabled list due to left shoulder soreness. He underwent shoulder surgery and missed the rest of the season. On November 1, the Dodgers bought out his 2008 option and allowed Wolf to become a free agent.

=== San Diego Padres ===
On December 1, 2007, Wolf signed a one-year contract with the San Diego Padres. On April 15, 2008, Wolf had a no-hitter through 6 2/3 innings against the Colorado Rockies at Petco Park before Brad Hawpe hit a single.

=== Houston Astros ===
On July 22, 2008, Wolf was traded to the Houston Astros for Chad Reineke.

=== Second stint with the Los Angeles Dodgers ===
On February 6, 2009, Wolf signed a one-year, $5 million contract to return to the Dodgers. He turned in one of his best seasons, finishing 11–7 with a 3.23 ERA in 34 starts for the team.

=== Milwaukee Brewers ===
On December 14, 2009, Wolf agreed to a three-year, $29.75 million contract with the Milwaukee Brewers.

In 2010, Wolf finished 13–12 in 34 starts. In 2011, he started 33 games (4th in the National League) and was 13–10, with a 3.69 ERA. Through 2011, his 9 career shutouts were 6th-most of all active pitchers. On October 13 in the 2011 NLCS against the St. Louis Cardinals, Randy Wolf won his first career postseason start. With this victory, Wolf is no longer the active leader in career games started without a postseason win. The Brewers lost the NLCS against the St. Louis Cardinals in 6 games. On August 22, 2012, Wolf was given his release by the Brewers organization after going 3–10 with a 5.69 ERA. Jeff Bianchi was brought up from Triple A to fill his spot on the roster. A few weeks before being released, Wolf threw a 49 mph curveball, the slowest in MLB history.

=== Baltimore Orioles ===
On August 31, 2012, Wolf signed with the Baltimore Orioles and was subsequently added to the team's 25-man roster as a member of the bullpen. Wolf was also included on the Orioles postseason roster until losing the 2012 ALDS against the Yankees. Wolf went 2–0 in 5 games for the O's. He became a free agent following the season on November 3..

=== 2013 ===
On October 30, Wolf underwent Tommy John surgery for the second time of his career. As a result, Wolf missed the entire 2013 season.

=== Seattle Mariners ===
On February 13, 2014, Wolf signed a minor league contract with the Seattle Mariners. The Mariners' released him on March 25.

=== Arizona Diamondbacks ===
On April 11, 2014, he signed a minor league contract with the Arizona Diamondbacks. Wolf opted out of his contract on May 14, 2014.

=== Miami Marlins ===
On May 14, 2014, Wolf agreed to a one-year contract with the Miami Marlins. Wolf pitched in 6 games for the Marlins, posting a 1–3 record with a 5.26 ERA. On June 16, the Marlins designated Wolf for assignment after a couple of poor starts. Two days later on June 18, Wolf cleared outright waviers and elected free agency.

=== Second stint with the Baltimore Orioles ===
On June 22, 2014, Wolf agreed to a minor league contract to return to the Orioles. After 6 games (1 start) with the Triple-A Norfolk Tides, he opted out of his minor league deal on July 13.

=== Los Angeles Angels of Anaheim ===
On July 26, 2014, Wolf signed a minor league deal with the Los Angeles Angels of Anaheim. He made 7 starts for the Triple-A Salt Lake Bees. He became a free agent following the season on November 3.

=== Toronto Blue Jays ===
On March 16, 2015, Wolf signed a minor-league contract with the Toronto Blue Jays. The Blue Jays announced the signing officially on March 18, and assigned him to the Triple-A Buffalo Bisons. Wolf made 23 starts for the Bisons in 2015, and posted a 9–2 record, with a 2.58 ERA, 106 strikeouts and 40 walks in 139 2/3 innings.

=== Detroit Tigers ===
On August 20, 2015, Wolf was traded to the Detroit Tigers for cash considerations. He had his contract selected on August 22, he made his debut for the Tigers the same day in a game against the Texas Rangers. In his debut, he pitched seven innings, allowing four runs, three earned, on nine hits, with five strikeouts and no walks. Eight of Texas' first 14 batters singled against him, before retiring 14 of the final 15 batters he faced. Wolf appeared in a total of 8 games with the Tigers, pitching to an 0–5 record with a 6.23 ERA. Wolf retired during the offseason, following a 16-year career.

== Scouting report ==
Wolf threw a four-seam fastball and a two-seam fastball clocked at 87–90 mph. He also threw a cut fastball in the mid-80s, a late breaking slider in the upper 70s, a sweeping curveball in the upper 60s to lower 70s, and occasionally mixed in a changeup in the upper 70s. Wolf primarily pitched to contact for fly balls, though he was capable of racking up strikeouts in his starts.

== Personal life ==
Wolf's older brother, Jim, is a Major League umpire. To avoid potential conflicts of interest, Jim did not work behind the plate during his brother's starts. Eventually Jim would not officiate in any capacity in games Randy's team were playing. If his crew was involved in games that included Randy's team, he was removed from those games and switched with another umpire. Wolf's cousin, Sid Akins, is a retired professional baseball player who appeared in the 1984 Summer Olympics.

In 2007, Wolf purchased a house in Los Angeles' Hollywood Hills from rocker Slash.
