= Doug Bernier =

American baseball player (born 1980)

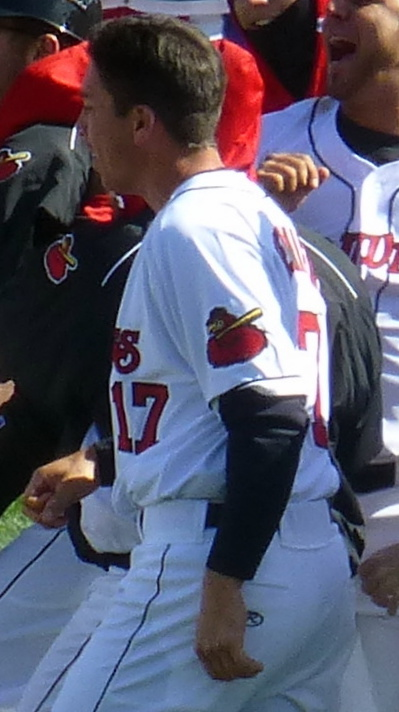
- Bernier with the Rochester Red Wings in 2015

Colorado Rockies – No. 50
- Infielder / Coach
- Born: June 24, 1980 (age 46); Santa Maria, California, U.S.
- Batted: Right Threw: Right

MLB debut
- June 17, 2008, for the Colorado Rockies

Last MLB appearance
- May 17, 2015, for the Minnesota Twins

MLB statistics
- Batting average: .217
- Home runs: 0
- Runs batted in: 7
- Stats at Baseball Reference

Teams
- As player: Colorado Rockies (2008); Minnesota Twins (2013–2015); As coach: Colorado Rockies (2026–present)

Douglas Howell Bernier (born June 24, 1980) is an American former professional baseball infielder who currently serves as the first base coach for the Colorado Rockies of Major League Baseball (MLB). He is an alumnus of Oral Roberts University. He played in MLB for the Rockies and Minnesota Twins.

== Playing career ==
=== Amateur career ===
Bernier attended St. Joseph High School in Santa Maria, California where he was primarily a pitcher. He did not receive any scholarship offers from any four-year schools and chose to begin his college baseball career at Cuesta College. At Cuesta, Bernier started every game at shortstop and set school records in walks in a single season and in a career. Bernier continued his college career at Oral Roberts where he had a .332 career batting average and was named to the Mid-Continent Conference First Team as a senior.

=== Colorado Rockies ===
Bernier was selected as a non-drafted free agent by the Colorado Rockies in 2002. He would make his Major League Baseball debut with the Colorado Rockies on June 17, 2008, as a defensive replacement. At the time, the Rockies needed an extra bat due to an injury to Troy Tulowitzki and the suspension of Yorvit Torrealba after a brawl. On June 19, 2008, Bernier would earn his first major league start. Although hitless in his first two appearances, Bernier would go errorless in the field while showing impressive defensive skills.

Bernier was one of many second basemen to appear for the Rockies in 2008. With the departure of starter Kazuo Matsui prior to the season, the Rockies struggled to find a replacement. Bernier competed for the role with teammates Jayson Nix, Jeff Baker, and Omar Quintanilla before the position was awarded to former starting shortstop Clint Barmes.

On June 20, 2008, Bernier was optioned back to Triple-A Colorado Springs to open a roster spot for returning shortstop Troy Tulowitzki. On June 26, he was removed from the 40-man roster and became a free agent at the end of the season.

=== New York Yankees ===
In December 2008, Bernier signed a minor-league contract with the New York Yankees, and attended spring training as a non-roster invitee. Although compiling a solid spring performance in an attempt to land a roster spot as starter Robinson Canó's backup, Bernier was reassigned to the Triple A Scranton/Wilkes-Barre Yankees at the beginning of the 2009 season.

=== Pittsburgh Pirates ===
On February 5, 2010, Bernier signed a minor-league contract with the Pittsburgh Pirates with an invitation to spring training.

=== New York Yankees (second stint) ===
Bernier signed a minor league contract with an invitation to spring training with the Yankees for the 2011 season and was assigned to Scranton/Wilkes-Barre to begin the season. Bernier remained with Triple-A the entire 2011 season.

For the 2012 season, Bernier re-signed a minor league contract with an invitation to spring training with the Yankees. After batting .361 in spring training with the New York Yankees, Doug was assigned to the Triple-A Empire State Yankees to start the season.

=== Minnesota Twins ===
Bernier signed with the Minnesota Twins before the 2013 season. Bernier began the season with Triple-A Rochester. In the first half with Rochester, he hit .295/.370/.407 with 3 HR, 41 RBI and 47 runs as the team's shortstop. Before the second half, he was called up by the Twins, replacing Eduardo Escobar. His first major-league hit came in his first start with the Twins, an RBI double off Joe Blanton. Used mostly as a late-inning replacement, in 33 games, he hit .226/.339/.283 with 5 RBI. He was outrighted off the 40-man roster on October 4, 2013, and elected free agency

On October 12, Bernier signed a minor league deal with an invitation to spring training to stay with the Twins.

=== Texas Rangers ===
On February 6, 2016, Bernier signed a minor league contract with the Texas Rangers. He won the PCL Player of the Week Award on July 31.

Bernier spent the 2017 season with the Triple–A Round Rock Express, also playing in two games for the rookie–level Arizona League Rangers. In 61 games for Round Rock, he hit .247/.312/.318 with three home runs and 17 RBI. Bernier elected free agency following the season on November 6, 2017.

== Coaching career ==
Bernier announced his retirement as a baseball player in May 2018. After his playing career ended, he took a job as a scout for the Colorado Rockies and founded a baseball instruction website called Pro Baseball Insider. His website includes baseball instruction tips, videos and articles from many different Major League and Minor League players and coaches, most of which is free to the public.

In addition to his website, Bernier has also continued his career in pro ball. For the 2018 and 2019 baseball season, Bernier was a pro scout for the Colorado Rockies.

In 2020, Bernier took on a Major League staff role, as the Colorado Rockies Data and Game Planning Coordinator.

For the 2022 season, Doug Bernier is the Colorado Rockies' Minor League Defensive Coordinator.

On January 13, 2026, the Colorado Rockies hired Bernier to serve as the team's first base coach.
