= 2008 Colorado Rockies season =

2008 Colorado Rockies
- League: National League
- Division: West
- Ballpark: Coors Field
- City: Denver, Colorado
- Record: 74–88 (.457)
- Divisional place: 3rd
- Owners: Charles & Richard Monfort
- General manager: Dan O'Dowd
- Manager: Clint Hurdle
- Television: FSN Rocky Mountain; KTVD (My20)
- Radio: KOA
- Stats: ESPN.com; Baseball Reference

The Colorado Rockies' 2008 season was the team's 16th season overall. The Rockies attempted to repeat their previous season's success after making it to the World Series; however, they ended up finishing third place in the National League West with a record of 74-88. The Rockies drew 2,650,218 fans for the season, their highest total since 2002. The average home attendance was 33,127 fans.

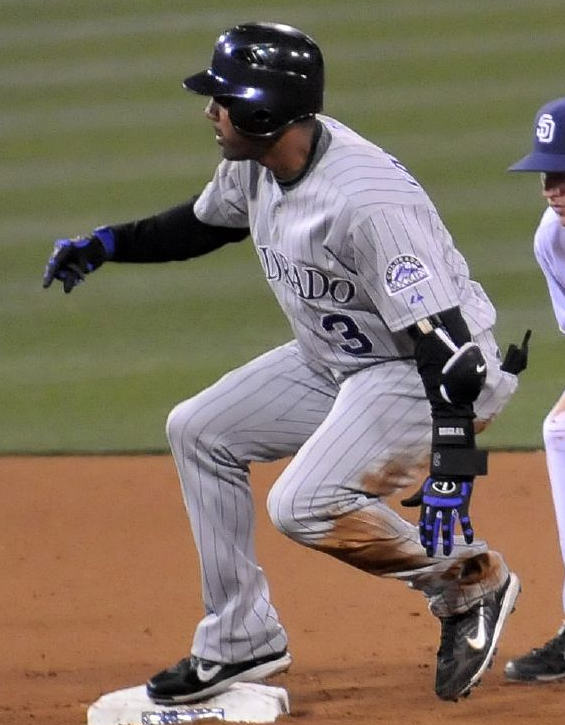
Willy Taveras in April 2008

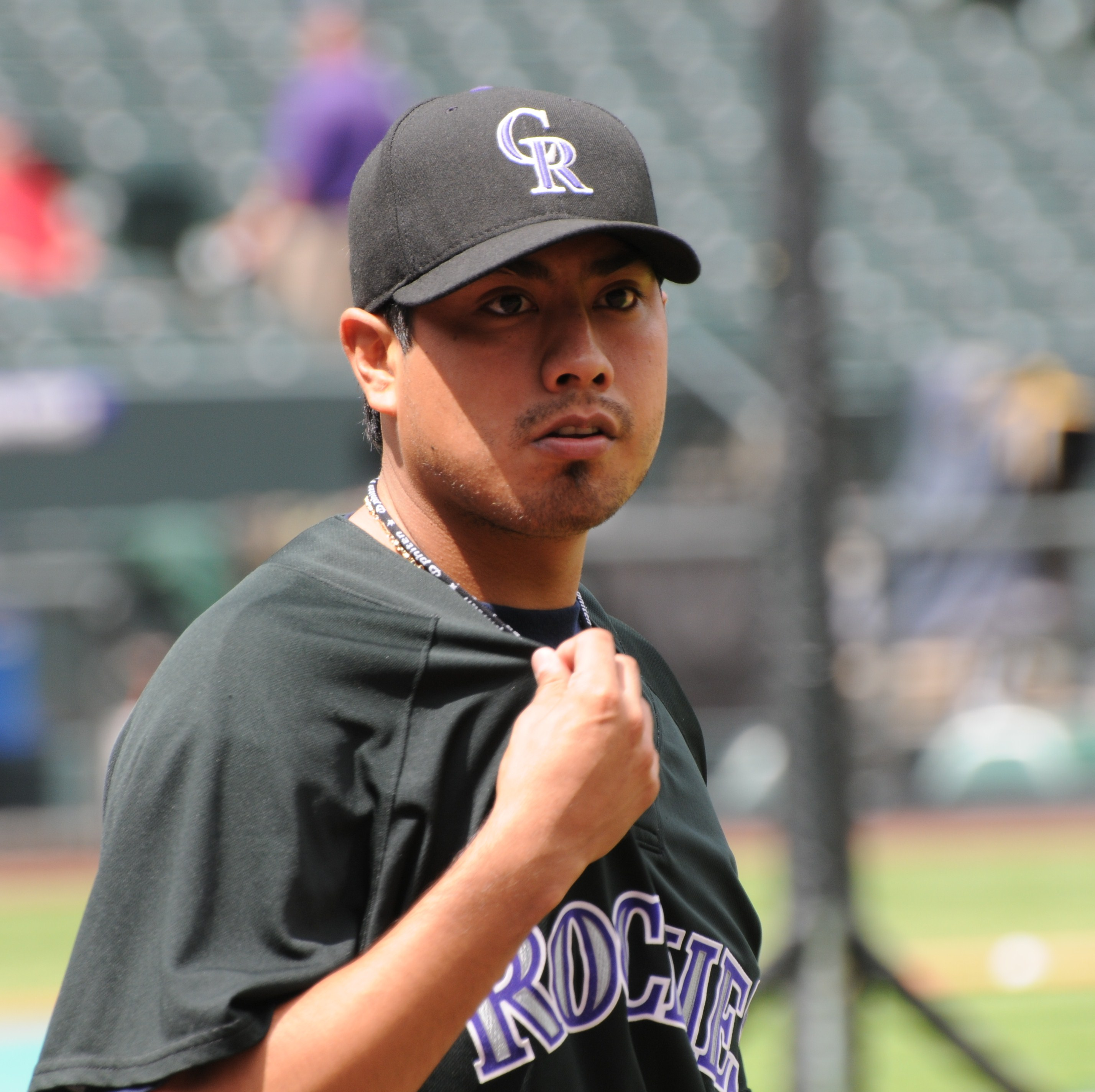
Jorge de la Rosa in August 2008

Likely the most memorable game of the year was against the San Diego Padres on April 17, as it went 22 innings before Troy Tulowitzki drove in the winning run. It is the longest Rockies game in franchise history and (as of 2026) the longest game of the 21st century.

== Offseason ==
- December 7, 2007: Jamey Carroll was traded by the Colorado Rockies to the Cleveland Indians for a player to be named later. The Cleveland Indians sent Sean Smith (minors) (April 24, 2008) to the Colorado Rockies to complete the trade.
- December 13, 2007: Kip Wells and Luis Vizcaíno were signed as free agents by the Colorado Rockies.
- February 17, 2008: Scott Podsednik was signed as a free agent by the Colorado Rockies.
- March 26, 2008: Ramón Ramírez was traded by the Colorado Rockies to the Kansas City Royals for a player to be named later. The Kansas City Royals sent Jorge de la Rosa (April 30, 2008) to the Colorado Rockies to complete the trade.

== Regular season ==
=== Season standings ===
NL West
Team	W	L	Pct.	GB	Home	Road
Los Angeles Dodgers	84	78	.519	—	48‍–‍33	36‍–‍45
Arizona Diamondbacks	82	80	.506	2	48‍–‍33	34‍–‍47
Colorado Rockies	74	88	.457	10	43‍–‍38	31‍–‍50
San Francisco Giants	72	90	.444	12	37‍–‍44	35‍–‍46
San Diego Padres	63	99	.389	21	35‍–‍46	28‍–‍53

=== Record vs. opponents ===
2008 National League record Source: MLB Standings Grid – 2008
Team	AZ	ATL	CHC	CIN	COL	FLA	HOU	LAD	MIL	NYM	PHI	PIT	SD	SF	STL	WAS	AL
Arizona	–	3–5	2–4	2–4	15–3	2–7	4–2	8–10	2–5	3–3	3–4	4–3	10–8	11–7	3–4	4–2	6–9
Atlanta	5–3	–	0–6	3–3	4–3	10–8	3–3	4–2	3–6	11–7	4–14	2–5	5–1	2–5	2–5	6–12	8–7
Chicago	4–2	6–0	–	8–7	5–1	4–3	8–9	5–2	9–7	4–2	3–4	14–4	5–2	4–3	9–6	3–3	6–9
Cincinnati	4–2	3–3	7–8	–	1–5	6–2	3–12	1–7	10–8	3–4	3–5	6–9	4–3	5–1	5–10	4–3	9–6
Colorado	3–15	3–4	1–5	5–1	–	5–3	3–3	8–10	4–3	3–6	0–5	5–2	9–9	11–7	3–4	4–3	7–8
Florida	7–2	8–10	3–4	2–6	3–5	–	4–2	3–4	5–1	8–10	10–8	3–2	4–2	3–3	2–5	14–3	5–10
Houston	2–4	3–3	9–8	12–3	3–3	2–4	–	4–3	7–8	5–2	3–4	8–8	3–3	7–1	7–8	4–2	7–11
Los Angeles	10–8	2–4	2–5	7–1	10–8	4–3	3–4	–	4–2	3–4	4–4	5–2	11–7	9–9	2–4	3–3	5–10
Milwaukee	5–2	6–3	7–9	8–10	3–4	1–5	8–7	2–4	–	2–4	1–5	14–1	4–3	6–0	10–5	6–2	7–8
New York	3–3	7–11	2–4	4–3	6–3	10–8	2–5	4–3	4–2	–	11–7	4–3	2–5	5–1	4–3	12–6	9–6
Philadelphia	4–3	14–4	4–3	5–3	5–0	8–10	4–3	4–4	5–1	7–11	–	4–2	4–2	3–3	5–4	12–6	4–11
Pittsburgh	3–4	5–2	4–14	9–6	2–5	2–3	8–8	2–5	1–14	3–4	2–4	–	3–4	4–2	10–7	3–4	6–9
San Diego	8–10	1–5	2–5	3–4	9–9	2–4	3–3	7–11	3–4	5–2	2–4	4–3	–	5–13	1–6	5–1	3–15
San Francisco	7–11	5–2	3–4	1–5	7–11	3–3	1–7	9–9	0–6	1–5	3–3	2–4	13–5	–	4–3	7–0	6–12
St. Louis	4–3	5–2	6–9	10–5	4–3	5–2	8–7	4–2	5–10	3–4	4–5	7–10	6–1	3–4	–	5–1	7–8
Washington	2–4	12–6	3–3	3–4	3–4	3–14	2–4	3–3	2–6	6–12	6–12	4–3	1–5	0–7	1–5	–	8–10

=== Transactions ===
- April 30, 2008: Jason Grilli was traded by the Detroit Tigers to the Colorado Rockies for Zach Simons (minors).
- May 16, 2008: Glendon Rusch was signed as a free agent by the Colorado Rockies.
- August 6, 2008: Liván Hernández was selected off waivers by the Colorado Rockies from the Minnesota Twins.
- August 14, 2008: Kip Wells was released by the Colorado Rockies.

=== Major League debuts ===
- Batters:
  - Jayson Nix (Apr 1)
  - Jonathan Herrera (Apr 30)
  - Doug Bernier (Jun 17)
  - Dexter Fowler (Sep 2)
- Pitchers:
  - Greg Reynolds (May 11)
  - Cedrick Bowers (Jul 2)
  - Steven Register (Aug 4)

=== Game log ===
2008 Game Log
March

#	Date	Opponent	Score	Win	Loss	Save	Attendance	Record
–	March 31	@ Cardinals	Postponed (rain) Rescheduled for April 1					

April

#	Date	Opponent	Score	Win	Loss	Save	Attendance	Record
1	April 1	@ Cardinals	2–1	Buchholz (1–0)	Franklin (0–1)	Corpas (1)	45,996	1–0
2	April 2	@ Cardinals	8–3	Wellemeyer (1–0)	Cook (0–1)		39,915	1–1
3	April 3	@ Cardinals	3–0	Thompson (1–0)	Jiménez (0–1)	Isringhausen (1)	33,748	1–2
4	April 4	Diamondbacks	8–1	Owings (1–0)	Redman (0–1)		49,233	1–3
5	April 5	Diamondbacks	7–2	Webb (2–0)	Francis (0–1)		43,124	1–4
6	April 6	Diamondbacks	5–2 (10)	Lyon (1–1)	Bowie (0–1)	Qualls (1)	42,865	1–5
7	April 7	Braves	2–1	Herges (1–0)	Boyer (0–2)	Corpas (2)	24,304	2–5
8	April 8	Braves	4–3	Jiménez (1–1)	Jurrjens (1–1)	Corpas (3)	24,640	3–5
9	April 9	Braves	12–6	Redman (1–1)	James (0–1)		23,210	4–5
–	April 10	Braves	Postponed (snow) Rescheduled for June 16					
10	April 11	@ Diamondbacks	8–2	Webb (3–0)	Francis (0–2)		31,732	4–6
11	April 12	@ Diamondbacks	10–3	Haren (2–0)	Morales (0–1)		29,256	4–7
12	April 13	@ Diamondbacks	13–5	Cook (1–1)	González (0–1)		31,321	5–7
13	April 15	@ Padres	6–0	Wolf (1–0)	Jiménez (1–2)		24,439	5–8
14	April 16	@ Padres	10–2	Redman (2–1)	Germano (0–1)		21,730	6–8
15	April 17	@ Padres	2–1 (22)	Wells (1–0)	Rusch (0–1)		25,984	7–8
16	April 18	@ Astros	11–5	Morales (1–1)	Sampson (0–2)		34,272	8–8
17	April 19	@ Astros	3–2	Cook (2–1)	Villarreal (0–3)	Corpas (4)	34,540	9–8
18	April 20	@ Astros	6–4	Wright (2–0)	Fuentes (0–1)	Valverde (2)	35,286	9–9
19	April 21	Phillies	9–5	Seánez (2–1)	Buchholz (1–1)		24,886	9–10
20	April 22	Phillies	8–6	Madson (1–0)	Corpas (0–1)	Lidge (4)	26,665	9–11
21	April 23	Cubs	7–6 (10)	Wood (2–0)	Wells (1–1)	Mármol (2)	36,864	9–12
22	April 24	Cubs	4–2	Cook (3–1)	Hart (2–1)	Fuentes (1)	32,791	10–12
23	April 25	@ Dodgers	8–7 (13)	Park (1–0)	Buchholz (1–2)		53,205	10–13
24	April 26	@ Dodgers	11–3	Penny (4–2)	Redman (2–2)		50,469	10–14
25	April 27	@ Dodgers	3–2 (10)	Beimel (1–0)	Corpas (0–2)		50,670	10–15
26	April 28	@ Giants	4–0	Cain (1–2)	Morales (1–2)		30,153	10–16
27	April 29	@ Giants	3–2	Cook (4–1)	Lincecum (4–1)	Fuentes (2)	32,176	11–16
28	April 30	@ Giants	3–2	Valdéz (1–0)	Speier (0–1)	Wilson (9)	30,509	11–17

May

#	Date	Opponent	Score	Win	Loss	Save	Attendance	Record
29	May 2	Dodgers	11–6	Penny (5–2)	Francis (0–3)		30,291	11–18
30	May 3	Dodgers	12–7	Kuo (1–1)	de la Rosa (0–1)		38,597	11–19
31	May 4	Dodgers	7–2	Cook (5–1)	Lowe (2–2)	Buchholz (1)	43,726	12–19
32	May 5	Cardinals	6–5	Flores (1–0)	Fuentes (0–2)	Isringhausen (11)	28,183	12–20
33	May 6	Cardinals	6–5	Looper (5–1)	Redman (2–3)	Franklin (1)	25,460	12–21
34	May 7	Cardinals	4–3	Speier (1–1)	Isringhausen (1–3)	Fuentes (3)	25,432	13–21
35	May 8	Cardinals	9–3	de la Rosa (1–1)	Lohse (3–2)		25,376	14–21
36	May 9	@ Padres	4–2	Cook (6–1)	Peavy (4–2)	Fuentes (4)	31,057	15–21
37	May 10	@ Padres	3–2	Maddux (3–3)	Jiménez (1–3)	Hoffman (6)	34,117	15–22
38	May 11	@ Padres	6–1	Young (3–3)	Reynolds (0–1)		28,624	15–23
39	May 13	@ Diamondbacks	8–4	Johnson (3–1)	Francis (0–4)		27,292	15–24
40	May 14	@ Diamondbacks	4–3	Owings (5–1)	de la Rosa (1–2)	Lyon (11)	23,127	15–25
41	May 15	@ Diamondbacks	8–5	Webb (9–0)	Cook (6–2)	Lyon (12)	21,447	15–26
42	May 16	Twins	4–2	Blackburn (4–2)	Jiménez (1–4)	Nathan (13)	35,336	15–27
43	May 17	Twins	3–2	Herges (2–0)	Hernández (6–2)	Fuentes (5)	43,149	16–27
44	May 18	Twins	6–2	Francis (1–4)	Slowey (0–4)		40,326	17–27
45	May 19	Giants	4–3	Grilli (1–0)	Chulk (0–3)	Fuentes (6)	28,362	18–27
46	May 20	Giants	6–5	Lincecum (6–1)	Cook (6–3)	Wilson (13)	28,361	18–28
47	May 21	Giants	3–2 (10)	Walker (2–2)	Herges (2–1)	Wilson (14)	27,081	18–29
48	May 23	Mets	6–5 (13)	Buchholz (2–2)	Heilman (0–1)		33,341	19–29
49	May 24	Mets	9–2	Vargas (1–2)	Francis (1–5)		38,142	19–30
50	May 25	Mets	4–1	Cook (7–3)	Maine (5–4)		42,123	20–30
51	May 26	@ Phillies	20–5	Moyer (5–3)	de la Rosa (1–3)		44,764	20–31
52	May 27	@ Phillies	7–4	Kendrick (4–2)	Jiménez (1–5)		34,716	20–32
53	May 28	@ Phillies	6–1	Eaton (1–3)	Reynolds (0–2)		39,845	20–33
54	May 29	@ Cubs	8–4	Wuertz (1–1)	Herges (2–2)		39,851	20–34
55	May 30	@ Cubs	10–9	Eyre (2–0)	Corpas (0–3)	Wood (13)	39,686	20–35
56	May 31	@ Cubs	5–4	Dempster (7–2)	Rusch (1–3)	Mármol (3)	41,529	20–36

June

#	Date	Opponent	Score	Win	Loss	Save	Attendance	Record
57	June 1	@ Cubs	5–3	Gallagher (3–1)	Jiménez (1–6)	Wood (14)	41,730	20–37
58	June 2	@ Dodgers	8–2	Lowe (3–5)	Reynolds (0–3)		39,098	20–38
59	June 3	@ Dodgers	3–0	Francis (2–5)	Penny (5–7)	Fuentes (7)	38,548	21–38
60	June 4	@ Dodgers	2–1	Cook (8–3)	Kershaw (0–1)	Fuentes (8)	36,393	22–38
61	June 6	Brewers	6–4	Corpas (1–3)	Mota (2–4)	Fuentes (9)	30,558	23–38
62	June 7	Brewers	7–2	Reynolds (1–3)	Bush (2–6)		37,283	24–38
63	June 8	Brewers	3–2	Suppan (4–4)	Francis (2–6)	Torres (7)	32,256	24–39
64	June 10	Giants	10–5	Cook (9–3)	Misch (0–3)		28,359	25–39
65	June 11	Giants	1–0	Fuentes (1–2)	Yabu (2–3)		26,235	26–39
66	June 12	Giants	10–7	Sánchez (6–3)	Reynolds (1–4)	Wilson (19)	30,376	26–40
67	June 13	@ White Sox	5–4	Thornton (3–1)	Herges (2–3)	Jenks (16)	30,143	26–41
68	June 14	@ White Sox	2–0	Grilli (2–0)	Dotel (3–4)	Fuentes (10)	35,663	27–41
69	June 15	@ White Sox	5–3	Cook (10–3)	Contreras (6–5)	Fuentes (11)	32,004	28–41
70	June 16	Braves	7–1	Jurrjens (7–3)	Jiménez (1–7)		25,120	28–42
71	June 17	Indians	10–2	Reynolds (2–4)	Byrd (3–7)		28,146	29–42
72	June 18	Indians	4–2	Francis (3–6)	Laffey (4–4)	Fuentes (12)	28,339	30–42
73	June 19	Indians	6–3	de la Rosa (2–3)	Sowers (0–2)	Fuentes (13)	33,174	31–42
74	June 20	Mets	7–2	Maine (7–5)	Cook (10–4)		30,411	31–43
75	June 21	Mets	7–1	Jiménez (2–7)	Martínez (2–1)		35,637	32–43
76	June 22	Mets	3–1	Pelfrey (4–6)	Reynolds (2–5)	Wagner (17)	45,019	32–44
77	June 23	@ Royals	8–4	Bannister (7–6)	Francis (3–7)		12,260	32–45
78	June 24	@ Royals	7–3	Greinke (7–4)	de la Rosa (2–4)		19,169	32–46
79	June 25	@ Royals	4–2	Hochevar (5–5)	Cook (10–5)	Soria (21)	16,615	32–47
80	June 27	@ Tigers	7–1	Bonine (2–0)	Jiménez (2–8)		40,842	32–48
81	June 28	@ Tigers	7–6	Dolsi (1–2)	Fuentes (1–3)		42,729	32–49
82	June 29	@ Tigers	4–3	Rogers (6–5)	Reynolds (2–6)	Jones (15)	41,305	32–50
83	June 30	Padres	15–8	Bell (6–3)	Fuentes (1–4)		43,248	32–51

July

#	Date	Opponent	Score	Win	Loss	Save	Attendance	Record
84	July 1	Padres	4–0	Cook (11–5)	Banks (2–3)		26,221	33–51
85	July 2	Padres	8–1	Jiménez (3–8)	Wolf (5–8)		28,377	34–51
86	July 3	Marlins	6–5 (11)	Herges (3–3)	Gregg (6–3)		48,084	35–51
87	July 4	Marlins	18–17	Buchholz (3–2)	Gregg (6–4)		48,691	36–51
88	July 5	Marlins	12–6	de la Rosa (3–4)	Tucker (2–3)		35,137	37–51
89	July 6	Marlins	10–5	Volstad (1–0)	Cook (11–6)		27,168	37–52
90	July 7	@ Brewers	4–3	Jiménez (4–8)	McClung (5–4)	Fuentes (14)	35,161	38–52
91	July 8	@ Brewers	7–3	Sabathia (7–8)	Redman (2–4)		42,533	38–53
92	July 9	@ Brewers	8–3	Rusch (2–3)	Sheets (10–3)		37,092	39–53
93	July 10	@ Brewers	11–1	Bush (5–8)	de la Rosa (3–5)		43,389	39–54
94	July 11	@ Mets	2–1	Feliciano (2–2)	Buchholz (3–3)	Wagner (21)	49,016	39–55
95	July 12	@ Mets	3–0	Muñiz (1–1)	Jiménez (4–9)	Wagner (22)	54,137	39–56
96	July 13	@ Mets	7–0	Pelfrey (8–6)	Redman (2–5)		51,293	39–57
97	July 17	Pirates	5–3	Jiménez (5–9)	Maholm (6–6)	Fuentes (15)	30,584	40–57
98	July 18	Pirates	5–2	Rusch (3–3)	Snell (3–8)	Fuentes (16)	37,114	41–57
99	July 19	Pirates	7–1	de la Rosa (4–5)	Herrera (0–1)		44,565	42–57
100	July 20	Pirates	11–3	Cook (12–6)	Duke (4–7)		30,488	43–57
101	July 21	Dodgers	16–10	Falkenborg (2–2)	Wells (1–2)		38,291	43–58
102	July 22	Dodgers	10–1	Jiménez (6–9)	Kershaw (0–3)		41,567	44–58
103	July 23	Dodgers	5–3	Rusch (4–3)	Kuroda (5–7)	Fuentes (17)	36,305	45–58
104	July 25	@ Reds	7–2	Cook (13–6)	Vólquez (12–4)		27,501	46–58
105	July 26	@ Reds	5–1	de la Rosa (5–5)	Bailey (0–4)		33,981	47–58
106	July 27	@ Reds	11–0	Jiménez (7–9)	Fogg (2–3)		28,246	48–58
107	July 28	@ Pirates	8–4	Snell (4–8)	Grilli (2–1)		15,303	48–59
108	July 29	@ Pirates	6–4	Davis (1–0)	Herges (3–4)	Yates (1)	17,507	48–60
109	July 30	@ Pirates	7–4	Cook (14–6)	Duke (4–9)	Fuentes (18)	16,587	49–60
110	July 31	@ Marlins	12–2	Sánchez (1–0)	de la Rosa (5–6)		13,634	49–61

August

#	Date	Opponent	Score	Win	Loss	Save	Attendance	Record
111	August 1	@ Marlins	5–2	Jiménez (8–9)	Volstad (2–2)	Fuentes (19)	16,555	50–61
112	August 2	@ Marlins	5–3	Nolasco (11–6)	De Los Santos (0–1)	Gregg (24)	22,324	50–62
113	August 3	@ Marlins	3–2	Buchholz (4–3)	Nelson (2–1)	Fuentes (20)	14,310	51–62
114	August 4	Nationals	9–4	Redding (8–6)	Cook (14–7)		33,143	51–63
115	August 5	Nationals	8–2	Corpas (2–3)	Ayala (1–7)		27,483	52–63
–	August 6	Nationals	Postponed (rain) Rescheduled for August 7					
116	August 7	Nationals	6–3	Bergmann (2–8)	Francis (3–8)	Hanrahan (2)		52–64
117	August 7	Nationals	6–3	Pérez (5–8)	Jiménez (8–10)	Hanrahan (3)	30,448	52–65
118	August 8	Padres	6–3	Rusch (5–3)	Peavy (8–8)	Fuentes (21)	33,147	53–65
119	August 9	Padres	8–3	Maddux (6–8)	Cook (14–8)	Hoffman (25)	41,640	53–66
120	August 10	Padres	16–7	Hampson (1–1)	Hernández (10–9)		45,660	53–67
121	August 12	Diamondbacks	4–2	Johnson (10–8)	Jiménez (8–11)	Lyon (25)	31,218	53–68
122	August 13	Diamondbacks	6–5	Buchholz (5–3)	Rauch (4–3)	Fuentes (22)	30,247	54–68
123	August 14	Diamondbacks	6–2	Haren (13–6)	Rusch (5–4)		27,575	54–69
124	August 15	@ Nationals	4–3	de la Rosa (6–6)	Redding (8–8)	Fuentes (23)	27,965	55–69
125	August 16	@ Nationals	13–6	Hernández (11–9)	Lannan (6–12)		28,909	56–69
126	August 17	@ Nationals	7–2	Cook (15–8)	Pérez (5–9)		31,467	57–69
127	August 19	@ Dodgers	8–3	Jiménez (9–11)	Kuroda (7–9)		46,687	58–69
128	August 20	@ Dodgers	4–3	Buchholz (6–3)	Broxton (3–5)	Fuentes (24)	48,183	59–69
129	August 21	@ Dodgers	3–1	Lowe (10–10)	de la Rosa (6–7)	Broxton (10)	44,885	59–70
130	August 22	Reds	8–5	Harang (4–13)	Hernández (11–10)	Cordero (25)	30,337	59–71
131	August 23	Reds	7–6	Vizcaíno (1–0)	Lincoln (1–4)	Fuentes (25)	42,282	60–71
132	August 24	Reds	4–3 (12)	Speier (2–1)	Lincoln (1–5)		31,173	61–71
133	August 25	@ Giants	4–2	Francis (4–8)	Cain (8–10)	Fuentes (26)	31,132	62–71
134	August 26	@ Giants	7–2	de la Rosa (7–7)	Palmer (0–2)	Grilli (1)	32,695	63–71
135	August 27	@ Giants	4–1	Lincecum (15–3)	Hernández (11–11)	Wilson (36)	31,627	63–72
136	August 29	@ Padres	9–4	Cook (16–8)	Hayhurst (0–1)		25,274	64–72
137	August 30	@ Padres	9–4	Geer (1–0)	Jiménez (9–12)		30,240	64–73
138	August 31	@ Padres	2–1	Hoffman (3–6)	Buchholz (6–4)		26,395	64–74

September

#	Date	Opponent	Score	Win	Loss	Save	Attendance	Record
139	September 1	Giants	4–0	de la Rosa (8–7)	Sánchez (8–10)		31,388	65–74
140	September 2	Giants	6–5 (12)	Grilli (3–1)	Yabu (3–6)		23,710	66–74
141	September 3	Giants	9–2	Zito (9–16)	Cook (16–9)		23,481	66–75
142	September 5	Astros	5–3	Jiménez (10–12)	Moehler (10–6)	Fuentes (27)	26,163	67–75
143	September 6	Astros	2–0	Oswalt (14–9)	Francis (4–9)		32,352	67–76
144	September 7	Astros	7–5	Brocail (7–5)	Buchholz (6–5)	Valverde (40)	30,509	67–77
145	September 9	@ Braves	5–4 (10)	Tavárez (1–2)	Buchholz (6–6)		21,821	67–78
146	September 10	@ Braves	9–5	Bennett (3–6)	Vizcaíno (1–1)		19,693	67–79
147	September 11	@ Braves	8–4	Jurrjens (13–9)	Rusch (5–5)		20,039	67–80
148	September 12	Dodgers	7–2	Billingsley (15–10)	Francis (4–10)		30,147	67–81
149	September 13	Dodgers	5–1	Kershaw (4–5)	de la Rosa (8–8)		40,291	67–82
150	September 14	Dodgers	1–0 (10)	Corpas (3–3)	Kuo (5–3)		28,910	68–82
151	September 15	Padres	11–5	LeBlanc (1–1)	Reynolds (2–7)		25,296	68–83
152	September 16	Padres	10–3	Jiménez (11–12)	Estes (2–3)		25,507	69–83
153	September 17	Padres	1–0	Hernández (12–11)	Geer (2–1)	Fuentes (28)	25,155	70–83
154	September 19	Diamondbacks	3–2	de la Rosa (9–8)	Scherzer (0–3)	Fuentes (29)	43,137	71–83
155	September 20	Diamondbacks	5–3	Peña (3–2)	Fuentes (1–5)	Qualls (6)	38,283	71–84
156	September 21	Diamondbacks	13–4	Haren (16–8)	Reynolds (2–8)		32,915	71–85
157	September 23	@ Giants	9–4	Jiménez (12–12)	Lincecum (17–5)		33,922	72–85
158	September 24	@ Giants	15–6	Hernández (13–11)	Sánchez (9–12)		31,942	73–85
159	September 25	@ Giants	3–1	de la Rosa (10–8)	Zito (10–17)	Fuentes (30)	31,857	74–85
160	September 26	@ Diamondbacks	6–4	Cruz (4–0)	Grilli (3–2)	Qualls (8)	34,590	74–86
161	September 27	@ Diamondbacks	6–4	Lyon (3–5)	Corpas (3–4)	Qualls (9)	33,234	74–87
162	September 28	@ Diamondbacks	2–1	Johnson (11–10)	Vizcaíno (1–2)		35,908	74–88

=== Roster ===
2008 Colorado Rockies
Roster
Pitchers: 41 Alberto Arias; 31 Cedrick Bowers; 44 Micah Bowie; 35 Taylor Buchholz; 41 José Capellán; 28 Aaron Cook; 60 Manuel Corpas; 29 Jorge de la Rosa; 39 Valerio De Los Santos; 26 Jeff Francis; 40 Brian Fuentes; 49 Jason Grilli; 34 Matt Herges; 61 Liván Hernández; 48 Jason Hirsh; 38 Ubaldo Jiménez; 56 Franklin Morales; 52 Juan Morillo; 45 Josh Newman; 55 Mark Redman; 41 Steven Register; 54 Greg Reynolds; 32 Glendon Rusch; 23 Ryan Speier; 51 Luis Vizcaíno; 16 Kip Wells	Catchers: 15 Edwin Bellorín; 20 Chris Iannetta; 16 Adam Melhuse; 8 Yorvit Torrealba; Infielders: 27 Garrett Atkins; 10 Jeff Baker; 21 Clint Barmes; 1 Doug Bernier; 17 Todd Helton; 21 Jonathan Herrera; 47 Joe Koshansky; 1 Jayson Nix; 6 Omar Quintanilla; 24 Ian Stewart; 2 Troy Tulowitzki	Outfielders: 14 Dexter Fowler; 11 Brad Hawpe; 5 Matt Holliday; 29,22 Scott Podsednik; 25 Seth Smith; 19 Ryan Spilborghs; 18 Cory Sullivan; 3 Willy Taveras	Manager: 13 Clint Hurdle; Coaches: 36 Bob Apodaca (pitching); 58 Alan Cockrell (hitting); 7 Mike Gallego (third base); 30 Glenallen Hill (first base); 53 Rick Mathews (bullpen); 9 Jamie Quirk (bench); 59 Mark Strittmatter (bullpen catcher)

== Player stats ==
= Indicates team leader

=== Batting ===
==== Starters by position ====
Note: Pos = Position; G = Games played; AB = At bats; H = Hits; Avg. = Batting average; HR = Home runs; RBI = Runs batted in

Pos	Player	G	AB	H	Avg.	HR	RBI
C	Chris Iannetta	104	333	88	.264	18	65
1B	Todd Helton	83	299	79	.264	7	29
2B	Clint Barmes	107	393	114	.290	11	44
SS	Troy Tulowitzki	101	377	99	.263	8	46
3B	Garrett Atkins	155	611	175	.286	21	99
LF	Matt Holliday	139	539	173	.321	25	88
CF	Willy Taveras	133	479	120	.251	1	26
RF	Brad Hawpe	138	488	138	.283	25	85

==== Other batters ====
Note: G = Games played; AB = At bats; H = Hits; Avg. = Batting average; HR = Home runs; RBI = Runs batted in

Player	G	AB	H	Avg.	HR	RBI
Jeff Baker	104	299	80	.268	12	48
Ian Stewart	81	266	69	.259	10	41
Yorvit Torrealba	70	236	58	.246	6	31
Ryan Spilborghs	89	233	73	.313	6	36
Omar Quintanilla	81	210	50	.238	2	15
Scott Podsednik	93	162	41	.253	1	15
Seth Smith	67	108	28	.259	4	15
Jonathan Herrera	28	61	14	.230	0	3
Jayson Nix	22	56	7	.125	0	2
Joe Koshansky	18	38	8	.211	3	8
Dexter Fowler	13	26	4	.154	0	0
Cory Sullivan	18	23	5	.217	0	4
Adam Melhuse	7	10	1	.100	0	1
Doug Bernier	2	4	0	.000	0	0
Edwin Bellorin	3	3	1	.333	0	0

=== Pitching ===
==== Starting pitchers ====
Note: G = Games pitched; IP = Innings pitched; W = Wins; L = Losses; ERA = Earned run average; SO = Strikeouts

Player	G	IP	W	L	ERA	SO
Aaron Cook	32	211.1	16	9	3.96	96
Ubaldo Jiménez	34	198.2	12	12	3.99	172
Jeff Francis	24	143.2	4	10	5.01	94
Jorge De La Rosa	28	130.0	10	8	4.92	128
Greg Reynolds	14	62.0	2	8	8.13	22
Mark Redman	10	45.1	2	5	7.54	20
Liván Hernández	8	40.1	3	3	8.03	13
Franklin Morales	5	25.1	1	2	6.39	9
Valerio De Los Santos	2	8.0	0	1	5.63	10

==== Other pitchers ====
Note: G = Games pitched; IP = Innings pitched; W = Wins; L = Losses; ERA = Earned run average; SO = Strikeouts

Player	G	IP	W	L	ERA	SO
Glendon Rusch	23	64.0	4	3	4.78	43
Jason Hirsh	4	8.2	0	0	8.31	6

==== Relief pitchers ====
Note: G = Games pitched; W = Wins; L = Losses; SV = Saves; ERA = Earned run average; SO = Strikeouts

Player	G	W	L	SV	ERA	SO
Brian Fuentes	67	1	5	30	2.73	82
Manuel Corpas	76	3	4	4	4.52	50
Taylor Buchholz	63	6	6	1	2.17	56
Matt Herges	58	3	4	0	5.04	46
Jason Grilli	51	3	2	1	2.93	59
Ryan Speier	43	2	1	0	4.06	33
Luis Vizcaíno	43	1	2	0	5.28	49
Kip Wells	15	1	2	0	5.27	22
Alberto Arias	12	0	0	0	2.63	5
Steven Register	10	0	0	0	9.00	8
Micah Bowie	10	0	1	0	9.00	5
Josh Newman	8	0	0	0	9.35	6
Cedrick Bowers	5	0	0	0	13.50	5
José Capellán	1	0	0	0	4.50	2
Juan Morillo	1	0	0	0	0.00	0

== Notes ==
- On April 17, 2008, Colorado beat the San Diego Padres, 2-1, in a 22-inning road game that spanned 6 hours and 16 minutes. It was the longest game in Rockies history, in terms of both total innings and total length of time. 659 total pitches were thrown in the game by 15 different pitchers (eight Rockies pitchers and seven Padres pitchers). The 22-inning affair was the longest since August 31, 1993, when the Minnesota Twins, at home, defeated the Cleveland Indians, 5-4, in 22 innings.
- On July 1, 2008, the Rockies defeated the San Diego Padres, 4-0, in the shortest nine-inning game in Coors Field history – one hour and 58 minutes.
- On July 4, 2008, Colorado defeated the Florida Marlins, 18-17, after at one point being down, 13-4. The nine-run deficit that the Rockies overcame made it the largest comeback win in team history.
- On September 14, 2008, the Rockies and Los Angeles Dodgers played a game that went scoreless into the bottom of the 10th inning at Coors Field. It was the longest scoreless stretch in Coors Field history. The Rockies eventually won the game, 1-0, as they scored the winning run in the bottom of the 10th inning.

== Farm system ==
Level	Team	League	Manager
AAA	Colorado Springs Sky Sox	Pacific Coast League	Tom Runnells
AA	Tulsa Drillers	Texas League	Stu Cole
A	Modesto Nuts	California League	Jerry Weinstein
A	Asheville Tourists	South Atlantic League	Joe Mikulik
A-Short Season	Tri-City Dust Devils	Northwest League	Fred Ocasio
Rookie	Casper Ghosts	Pioneer League	Tony Diaz

Records
Preceded by 2007	Colorado Rockies seasons 2008	Succeeded by 2009
