= Jeff Baker =

American baseball player (born 1981)

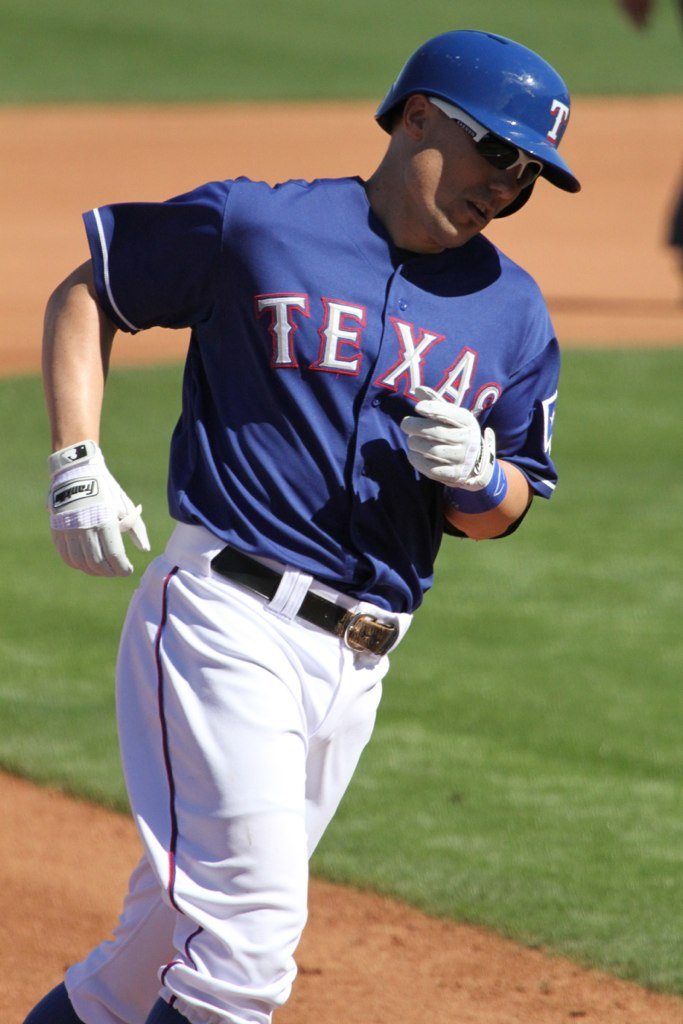
- Baker with the Texas Rangers in 2013
- Utility player
- Born: June 21, 1981 (age 45); Bad Kissingen, West Germany
- Batted: Right Threw: Right

MLB debut
- April 4, 2005, for the Colorado Rockies

Last MLB appearance
- July 7, 2015, for the Miami Marlins

MLB statistics
- Batting average: .264
- Home runs: 54
- Runs batted in: 235
- Stats at Baseball Reference

Teams
- Colorado Rockies (2005–2009); Chicago Cubs (2009–2012); Detroit Tigers (2012); Atlanta Braves (2012); Texas Rangers (2013); Miami Marlins (2014–2015)
Medals
Men's baseball
Representing United States
World Junior Baseball Championship
Gold medal – first place	1999 Kaohsiung	Team

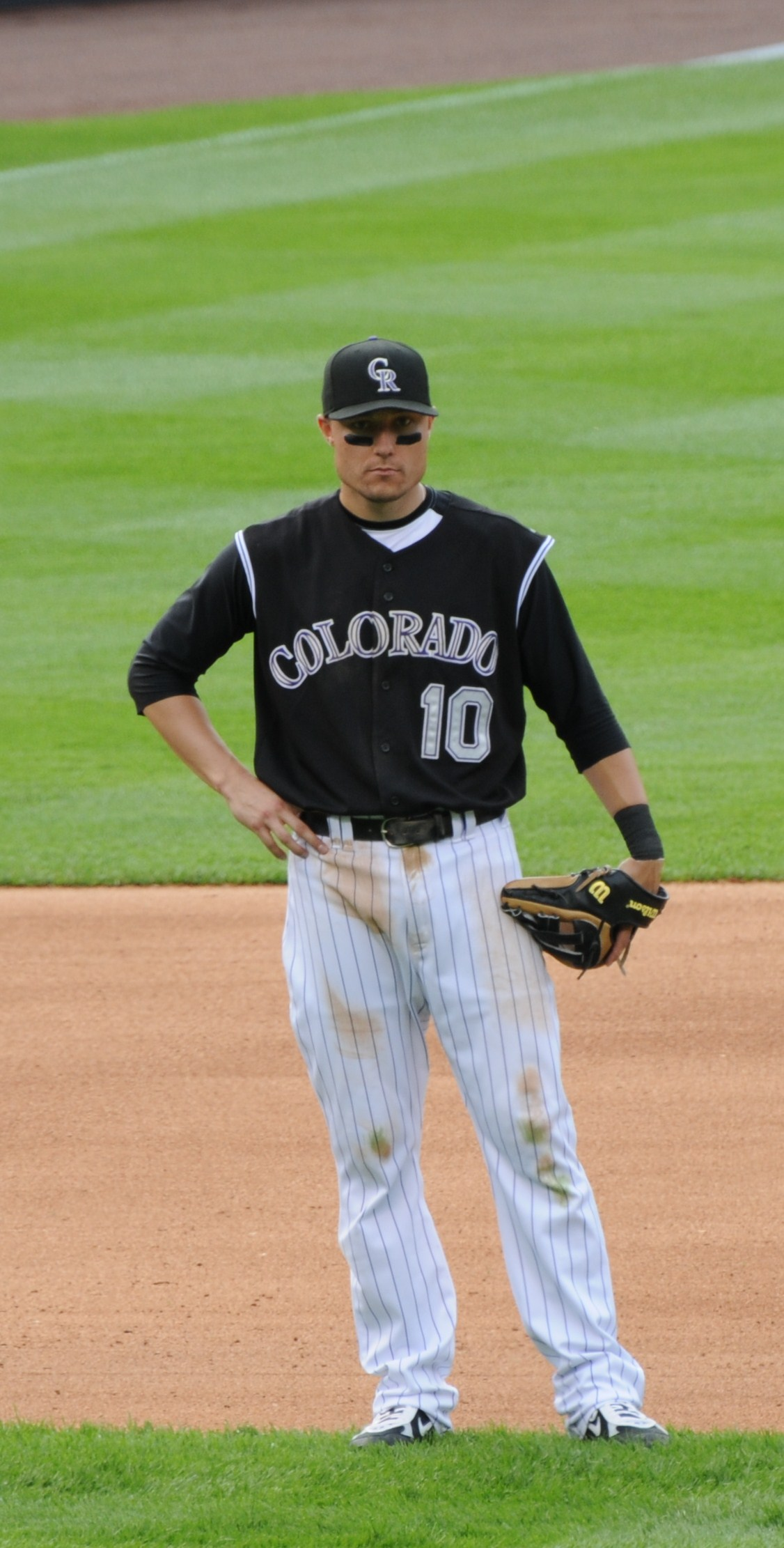
Baker during his tenure with the Colorado Rockies in 2008

Jeffrey Glen Baker (born June 21, 1981) is an American former professional baseball player. He bats and throws right-handed. He played in Major League Baseball for the Colorado Rockies, Chicago Cubs, Detroit Tigers, Atlanta Braves, Texas Rangers and Miami Marlins. Primarily a second baseman and first baseman, Baker also has experience in the outfield and at third base.

== Early life ==
Jeff Baker was born on June 21, 1981, in Bad Kissingen, West Germany, while his father, U.S. Army Lieutenant Colonel (Ret.) Larry Baker was stationed there. The family soon returned to the United States, and lived in El Paso, Texas, Phoenix, Arizona, and West Point, New York. Baker began playing baseball while his father was stationed in the Middle East, namely the United Arab Emirates and Saudi Arabia. Larry Baker was responsible for teaching his son the game, and coached him until Jeff graduated from Gar-Field High School in Dale City, Virginia. Baker was the 1999 All-Met Player of the Year. He then attended Clemson University, where he played college baseball, before playing professionally.

== Baseball career ==
=== College ===
Baker enrolled at Clemson University, where he played college baseball for the Clemson Tigers from 2000 to 2002. He played as third baseman as well as shortstop. Baker set the school record for career home runs with 59 home runs, a feat he accomplished in three years.

=== Colorado Rockies ===
Baker was drafted by the Rockies in 2004 after playing college baseball at Clemson University. He was a three-time Baseball America All-American and a finalist for the Golden Spikes Award in 2002 (the award was won by Clemson teammate Khalil Greene).

Baker made his Major League debut in 2005, as the Opening Day third baseman for the Colorado Rockies, playing a total of 12 games. He had been added to the Rockies lineup as a replacement for injured third baseman Garrett Atkins and on the return of Atkins, Baker was assigned to the Colorado Springs Sky Sox, the Rockies Triple-A affiliate.

In 2006, Baker played a full season for the Sky Sox, hitting.305 with 20 home runs and 108 runs batted in (RBIs), playing primarily in right field. He was named to the Baseball America All-Minor League team. He was then called up to the Rockies in early September and was rewarded with significant playing time in right field.

Baker has served as a super-utility type player for the Rockies during the 2007–08 seasons. He is able to play all corner positions, and has developed skill at second base. During Spring Training 2008, Baker contended for the starting second baseman spot, but was eventually beaten out by Jayson Nix. After Nix failed to adapt to the major league level, Baker spent the remainder of the season platooning at second base with Clint Barmes and Omar Quintanilla.

=== Chicago Cubs ===
On July 2, 2009, Baker was traded to the Chicago Cubs for minor league pitcher Al Alburquerque.

=== Detroit Tigers ===
On August 5, 2012, Baker was traded to the Detroit Tigers for two players to be named later. He was designated for assignment on August 31.

Baker appeared in 15 games for the Tigers after being acquired from the Cubs. The veteran played first base, second base, and both corner outfield positions while posting a line of.254/.293/.408 in 181 total plate appearances.

=== Atlanta Braves ===
On August 31, 2012, Baker was traded to the Atlanta Braves for a player to be named later, minor league pitcher Greg Ross.

=== Texas Rangers ===
In January 2013, Baker was signed by the Texas Rangers to a minor league contract with an invitation to spring training. He was named to the 2013 Opening Day roster in March. His first hit as a Ranger came on April 13 against the Mariners, and his first home run as a Ranger came on April 19, also against the Mariners. On June 14, he injured his thumb giving a high-five to teammate Craig Gentry, and missed about a month. Used more often against left-handed pitchers, he hit.314/.407/.667 with 10 HR and 18 RBI against them. In 74 games (44 starts, mostly at first base and left field), he hit.279/.360/.545 with 11 HR and 21 RBI. On October 9, Baker was designated for assignment to make room for Matt West, and elected free agency on October 14.

=== Miami Marlins ===
In February 2014, Baker agreed to a two-year, $3.7 million contract with the Miami Marlins. He was placed on the disabled list on July 10, 2015, after having strained his left intercostal muscle. He was released on July 31, 2015.

== Personal life ==
Baker is the son of a retired US Army colonel and is actively involved in the Wounded Warrior Project. During the offseason, his home is in Virginia.
