= Clint Barmes =

American baseball player (born 1979)

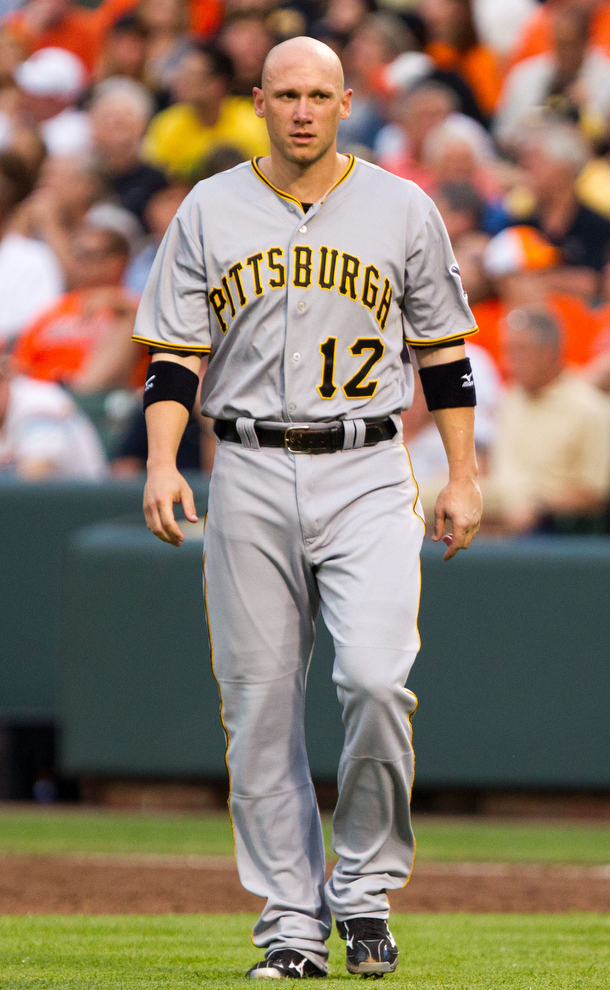
- Barmes with the Pittsburgh Pirates in 2012
- Shortstop / Second baseman
- Born: March 6, 1979 (age 47); Vincennes, Indiana, U.S.
- Batted: Right Threw: Right

MLB debut
- September 5, 2003, for the Colorado Rockies

Last MLB appearance
- October 4, 2015, for the San Diego Padres

MLB statistics
- Batting average: .245
- Home runs: 89
- Runs batted in: 415
- Stats at Baseball Reference

Teams
- Colorado Rockies (2003–2010); Houston Astros (2011); Pittsburgh Pirates (2012–2014); San Diego Padres (2015)

Clint Harold Barmes (BAR-miss, born March 6, 1979) is an American former professional baseball second baseman and shortstop. He played in Major League Baseball (MLB) from 2003 through 2015 for the Colorado Rockies, Houston Astros, Pittsburgh Pirates, and San Diego Padres.

== Collegiate career ==
Barmes attended Olney Central College and Indiana State University. While at Indiana State, Barmes was voted All-Region by the ABCA and All-Conference. Barmes teamed with Mitch Stetter to lead the Sycamores to the semi-finals of the Missouri Valley Conference Tournament.

Barmes played one season at Indiana State in 2000 after transferring from Olney Central College. Barmes led the Sycamores in hitting during his lone season at ISU, posting a .375 batting average with 93 hits, 18 doubles, seven triples and 10 home runs with 63 runs scored, 37 runs batted in and 20 stolen bases. Indiana State went 31-28-1 on the diamond in 2000, reaching the semifinals of the MVC Tournament.

In summers between college seasons, he played collegiate summer wood-bat baseball for the Kenosha Kroakers ('98) and Waterloo Bucks ('99-'00) of the Northwoods League.

== Professional career ==
=== Colorado Rockies ===
==== Minors ====
Drafted by the Rockies in 2000 out of Indiana State University, Barmes played three seasons of minor league baseball before reaching the majors with Colorado. He spent time in subsequent seasons (2004–2005, 2007–2008) for rehabilitation and demotions. In 2002, he was a post-season All-Star for the Carolina Mudcats of the Southern League; in 2004, he was a post-season All-Star for the Colorado Springs Sky Sox of the Pacific Coast League and 2007, he was a mid-season All-Star for the Colorado Springs Sky Sox of the Pacific Coast League.

==== 2003–05 seasons ====
From 2003 to 2004, Barmes posted a .292 batting average with two home runs and 12 RBIs in 32 games played. In 2005 in 81 games Clint hit .289, 10 home runs, and 46 RBIs.

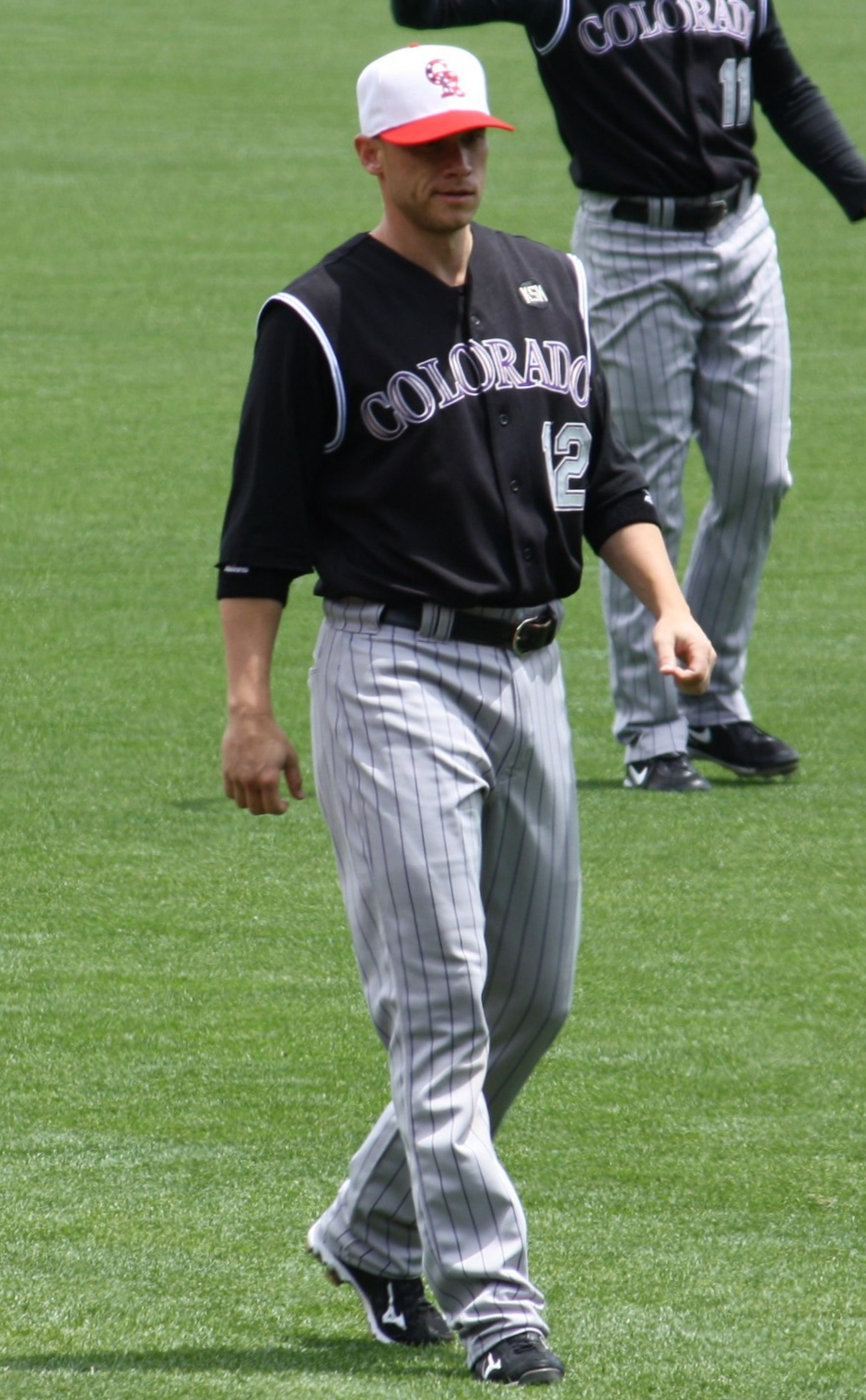
Barmes during his tenure with the Colorado Rockies in 2008

==== 2005 season ====
On Opening Day at Coors Field, Barmes hit a game-winning, walk-off home run off Trevor Hoffman of the San Diego Padres, becoming the first Rockies rookie to hit such a home run. At the end of the month, MLB selected Barmes as the National League Rookie of the Month for April. Barmes, who hit .410 with four home runs and 14 RBIs, also became the third player in MLB history to hit .400 or better in March/April, joining the New York Yankees' Willie Randolph in 1980 and Montreal Expos' Andrés Galarraga in 1986.

In June, Barmes suffered an injury that sidelined him until September after breaking his left collarbone in a fall while carrying a package of deer meat given to him as a gift by Todd Helton up the stairs in his apartment building on June 5. (Barmes initially told the team and the press that he got hurt carrying groceries, but later admitted that this was not the truth. He claimed that he was trying to prevent Helton from being embarrassed.) Barmes, who was leading National League rookies in most offensive categories, underwent surgery on June 7. He was hitting around .400 and led the major leagues in batting average for the first six weeks of the season. After a mild slump, he was still leading NL rookies in hitting (.329), runs (40), hits (74), doubles (16), home runs (8) and RBIs (34) up until the time of his injury. His Rookie of the Year candidacy, however, was ruined by his freak injury, which he called "the craziest thing that's happened to me, by far." However, Barmes still finished eighth in the National League Rookie of the Year voting for the season.

==== 2006 season ====
Barmes entered the 2006 season with high expectations. Many predicted a repeat of the beginning of the '05 season for Barmes in '06. Although Barmes set career highs in a number of offensive categories, his '06 season was widely considered a disappointment. He managed a subpar .220 batting average (the lowest of any starter in baseball) with only 7 home runs and a .264 on-base percentage.

==== 2007 season ====
As Spring Training prior to the 2007 season began, Barmes was informed that recently drafted prospect Troy Tulowitzki would be competing with him for the starting role in '07. After a spring performance that mirrored his unimpressive '06 season, Barmes ultimately lost the Rockies starting shortstop role to Tulowitzki. Subsequently, Barmes began the regular season with the Rockies Triple-A affiliate, the Colorado Springs Sky Sox. After an injury to starting second baseman Kazuo Matsui, Barmes was recalled to the Major League roster on April 15. After wearing jersey number 12 throughout his tenure in the Majors, Barmes switched to number 21 for the '07 season after veteran Steve Finley chose number 12 for the season.

Not long after being recalled, Barmes was sent down to Triple-A on May 1.

==== 2008 season ====
With Tulowitzki firmly entrenched in the shortstop position, Barmes entered Spring Training as one of four players aiming to start at second base for the Rockies. The job was ultimately won by Jayson Nix, who subsequently started the regular season very poorly. With the benching of Nix, Barmes competed with teammates Jeff Baker and Omar Quintanilla for the starting second baseman role. Barmes would win the job. He produced very well as the second baseman, although sustained an injury that put him on the Disabled List for several weeks. Upon his return Barmes continued as the Rockies starting second baseman for the remainder of the season. Barmes walked into Spring Training prior to the 2009 season as the starting second baseman.

==== 2009 season ====
In 2009, Barmes started off the season with the starting job and hit nearly .300. He went into a hitting slump and dropped down to .225, and then jumped on a hot streak and went up to .296 on June 19. He hit 23 home runs on the year.

==== 2010 season ====
Started regularly at 2B for the Rockies but was switched to shortstop following Troy Tulowitzki's wrist injury. When Tulowitzki returned from his injury Barmes moved back to 2B. Barmes struggled in the second half of the season and was benched in favor of Eric Young, Jr. He spent most of the second half as a defensive replacement. Barmes finished the season hitting .235, 8 HR, and 50 RBI.

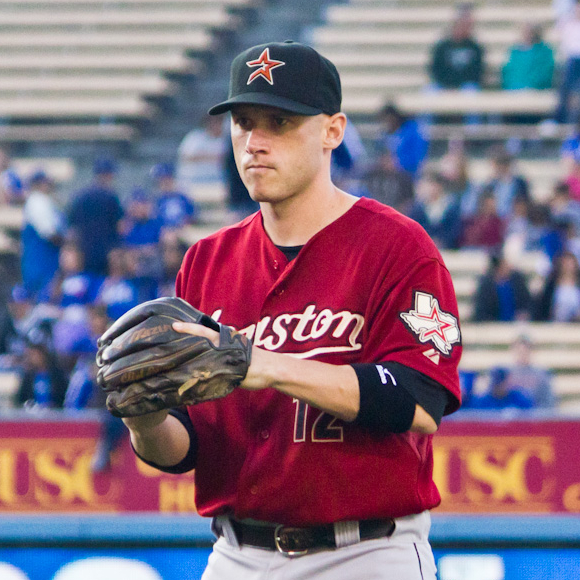
Barmes playing for the Houston Astros in 2011

=== Houston Astros ===
On November 18, 2010, Barmes was traded to the Houston Astros for Felipe Paulino. He got his first hit for the Astros (a two-run double) on May 3, 2011.

=== Pittsburgh Pirates ===
Barmes signed a two-year, $10.5 million contract with the Pittsburgh Pirates on November 21, 2011. On August 12, 2012, Barmes hit his first career grand slam to assist the Pirates in overturning a 5–2 deficit to an 11–5 victory against the Padres.

Overall the 2012 season was not a success for Barmes, he batted .229 on 445 at bats with 8 home runs, 45 RBIs, 16 doubles, and one triple. The 2013 season started off on the same route as '12 which eventually led to him being benched in favor of rookie Jordy Mercer. Over the course of the 2013 season, Barmes platooned with Mercer at shortstop. On December 12, 2013, Barmes signed a new one-year, $2 million contract to rejoin the Pirates for 2014 as Mercer's backup.

=== San Diego Padres ===
On December 5, 2014, Barmes signed a 1-year deal with the San Diego Padres.

On July 7, 2015, Barmes returned to Pittsburgh to face the Pirates. PNC Park played his walkup music Don't Stop Believin' by Journey to pay homage to his stint with the Bucs, and he was given a standing ovation by the fans.

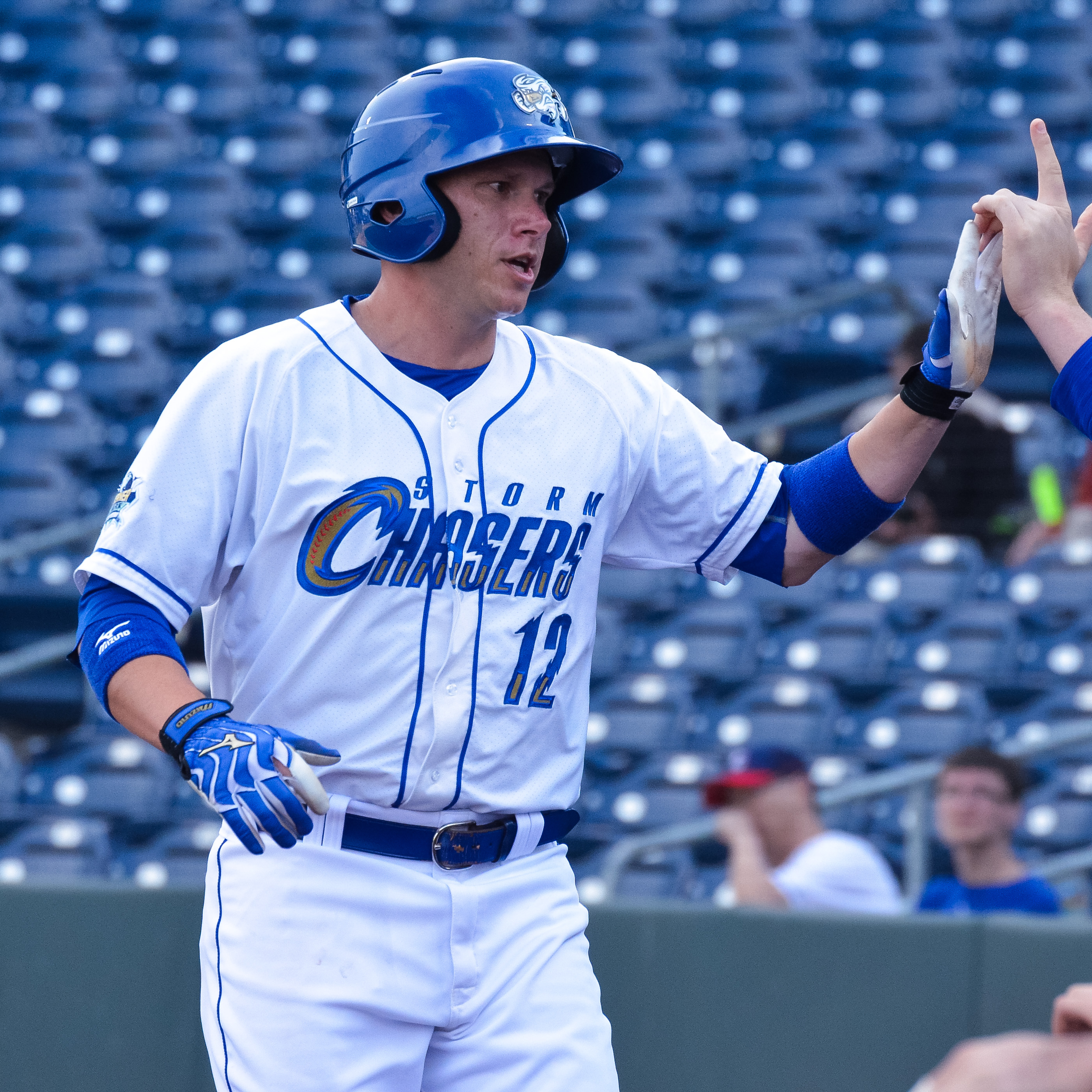
Barmes with the Omaha Storm Chasers, triple-A affiliates of the Royals, in 2016

=== Kansas City Royals ===
On February 18, 2016, Barmes signed a minor league deal with the Kansas City Royals as a non-roster invitee to spring training. He was released on March 28, and re-signed to another minor league contract on April 1.

=== Retirement ===
On May 23, 2016, Barmes announced his immediate retirement from baseball.

== Personal life ==
He was married in December 2006 to Summer Dennison. The couple has a boy named Wyatt James, who was born on September 18, 2007. His uncle, Bruce Barmes, played in MLB.
