= Steven Register =

American baseball player (born 1983)

- Pitcher
- Born: May 16, 1983 (age 41); Columbus, Georgia, U.S.
- Batted: Right Threw: Right

MLB debut
- August 4, 2008, for the Colorado Rockies

Last MLB appearance
- July 25, 2009, for the Philadelphia Phillies

MLB statistics
- Win–loss record: 0–0
- Earned run average: 8.25
- Strikeouts: 9

Teams
- Colorado Rockies (2008); Philadelphia Phillies (2009)
Medals
Men's baseball
Representing United States
Pan American Games
Silver medal – second place	2003 Santo Domingo	Team

Steven Craig Register (born May 16, 1983) is an American former professional baseball pitcher.

== Career ==
Register earned 37 saves in the Texas League in 2007, which was a league high. The New York Mets selected him in the Rule 5 Draft from the Rockies in December 2007, and he was added to their 40-man roster.

He was sent back to the Rockies on March 28, 2008. On August 4, 2008, he was called up to the MLB by the Colorado Rockies. On May 20, 2009, Register was claimed off waivers by the Philadelphia Phillies. He was called up to the majors on July 25, 2009.

On January 19, 2010, Register signed a minor league deal with the Toronto Blue Jays with an invite to 2010 Spring Training.
