= Troy Tulowitzki =

American baseball player (born 1984)

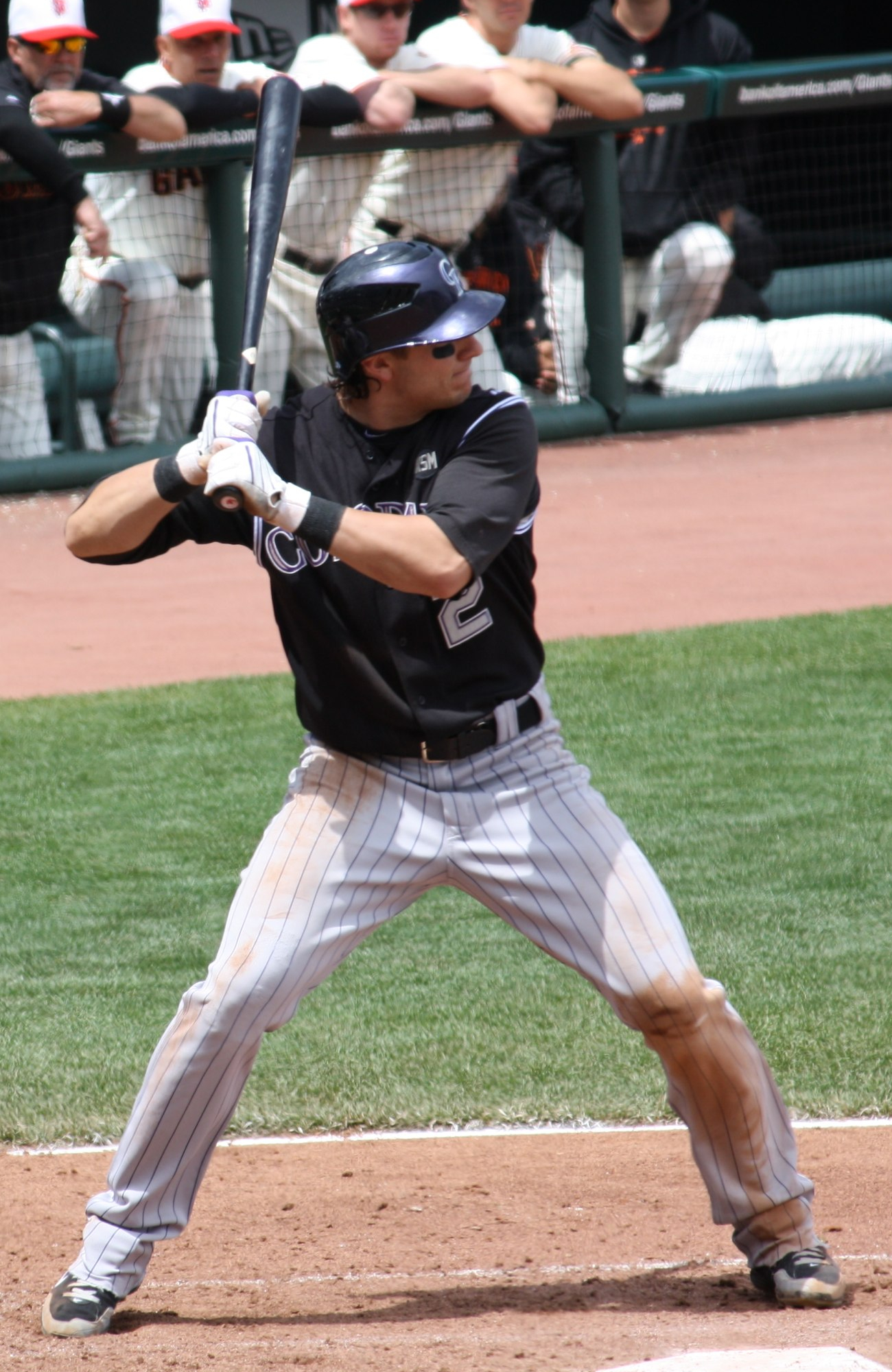
- Tulowitzki with the Colorado Rockies in 2010
- Shortstop
- Born: October 10, 1984 (age 42); Santa Clara, California, U.S.
- Batted: Right Threw: Right

MLB debut
- August 30, 2006, for the Colorado Rockies

Last MLB appearance
- April 3, 2019, for the New York Yankees

MLB statistics
- Batting average: .290
- Home runs: 225
- Runs batted in: 780
- Stats at Baseball Reference

Teams
- Colorado Rockies (2006–2015); Toronto Blue Jays (2015–2017); New York Yankees (2019)

Career highlights and awards
- 5× All-Star (2010, 2011, 2013–2015); 2× Gold Glove Award (2010, 2011); 2× Silver Slugger Award (2010, 2011)
Medals
Men's baseball
Representing United States
World University Championship
Gold medal – first place	2004 Tainan	Team

Troy Trevor Tulowitzki (born October 10, 1984), nicknamed "Tulo", is an American professional baseball coach and former shortstop who played 13 seasons in Major League Baseball (MLB), primarily with the Colorado Rockies. He also played for the Toronto Blue Jays and New York Yankees. Tulowitzki is currently an assistant baseball coach for the Texas Longhorns.

After playing college baseball for California State University, Long Beach, the Rockies selected Tulowitzki with the seventh overall selection of the 2005 MLB draft. He made his MLB debut the following year. Tulowitzki is a five-time MLB All-Star, a two-time Gold Glove Award winner, and a two-time Silver Slugger Award winner. The Rockies traded him to the Blue Jays in 2015. Tulowitzki missed most of the 2017 season and all of the 2018 season with injuries, and the Blue Jays released him after the 2018 season. In 2019, he signed with the Yankees, playing the first five games of the season before being sidelined with a calf strain; after experiencing setbacks, he announced his retirement from baseball in late July.

Tulowitzki's arm, range and instincts at shortstop were highly regarded. His size, ability and leadership skills garnered him comparisons to Cal Ripken Jr., Alex Rodriguez, and Derek Jeter. He had a reputation for being an injury-prone player, having played over 140 games in a season only three times and missing at least 30 games in several seasons due to various ailments.

He was inducted to the National Polish-American Sports Hall of Fame in 2024.

== Early life ==
Tulowitzki was born in Santa Clara, California. He graduated from Fremont High School in Sunnyvale, California. He earned four varsity letters in baseball and two in basketball. He was twice named second team All-State in baseball, and was a three-time team most valuable player (MVP). As a junior, Tulowitzki had a batting average of .536. He also had a 15–1 win–loss record as a pitcher. In his senior year, he batted .519 with six home runs. In basketball, Tulowitzki won league MVP, and was second team All-State and team MVP, averaging 22.6 points per game during his senior year. He was named Fremont High Athlete of the Year in 2002.

== College career ==
After high school, Tulowitzki enrolled at California State University, Long Beach, where he played college baseball for the Long Beach State Dirtbags for three seasons. Tulowitzki had a .962 career fielding percentage. Offensively, in 155 career games, he had a batting average of .310, with 20 home runs, 117 runs batted in (RBIs), 37 doubles, and a .491 slugging percentage. He also accumulated 31 multi-hit games in his collegiate career. Baseball America rated him as having the top arm and as the best defensive shortstop in the Big West Conference. Tulowitzki was a two-time All-Big West selection (second team in 2003 and first team in 2004) and a two-time All-Regional Tournament selection, earning Most Outstanding Player (MOP) honors in 2004. In 2004, he was selected for the United States collegiate national team and helped lead Team USA to a gold medal in the World University Baseball Championship.

== Professional career ==
=== Draft and minor leagues ===
The Colorado Rockies chose Tulowitzki with the seventh overall pick in the first round of the 2005 Major League Baseball draft. He received a $2.3 million signing bonus from the Rockies. He made his professional debut with the Modesto Nuts of the Class A-Advanced California League in 2005, and batted .266 in 22 games. In 2006, Tulowitzki played for the Tulsa Drillers of the Class AA Texas League. He had a .291 batting average, 13 home runs, and 61 RBIs in 104 games. Though he had a knee injury in June, he appeared in the 2006 All-Star Futures Game.

=== Colorado Rockies (2006–2015) ===
==== 2006–2008 ====
The Rockies promoted Tulowitzki to the major leagues on August 30, 2006. He made his major league debut that day against the New York Mets. He had four at-bats and went hitless with three strikeouts. Tulowitzki made it to the big leagues after playing just 126 minor league games. He collected his first Major League hit, an infield single off Óliver Pérez of the Mets, on August 31. Tulowitzki hit his first MLB home run on September 4, off Woody Williams of the San Diego Padres, in a 7–5 loss. He posted a .240 batting average with one home run and six RBIs in 25 games during the 2006 season.

Tulowitzki entered spring training prior to the 2007 season competing with incumbent Rockies shortstop Clint Barmes for the starting role. After a spring that saw Tulowitzki win the team's spring training MVP award, along with Barmes struggling offensively, Tulowitzki began the season as the Rockies' starting shortstop. On April 29, 2007, Tulowitzki turned the 13th unassisted triple play in MLB history, during a 9–7 home victory at Coors Field over the Atlanta Braves.

As a rookie, Tulowitzki established himself as a Gold Glove-caliber shortstop. He led all MLB shortstops in fielding percentage (.987), putouts (262), total chances (834), assists (561), and double plays turned (114; two more than Jack Wilson, in 233 more innings). He also ranked first in range factor (5.39) and second in zone rating (.866). Tulowitzki's .987 fielding percentage set an MLB single-season record by a rookie shortstop. He was also a major contributor in the Rockies' MLB-record .98925 fielding percentage for one season. Philadelphia Phillies shortstop Jimmy Rollins won the Gold Glove Award, despite the fact that Tulowitzki had a better fielding percentage (.987 to .985), zone rating, and range factor, and more total chances, putouts, and assists, and turned four more double plays in 66 1/3 fewer innings, than Rollins. They each had 11 errors, but Tulowitzki's came on 834 total chances, compared to Rollins' 717. Tulowitzki did, however, win the Fielding Bible Award at shortstop, which is awarded to the shortstop who a panel of national sports writers, scouts, and sports radio talk show hosts view as the best defensive shortstop in Major League Baseball.

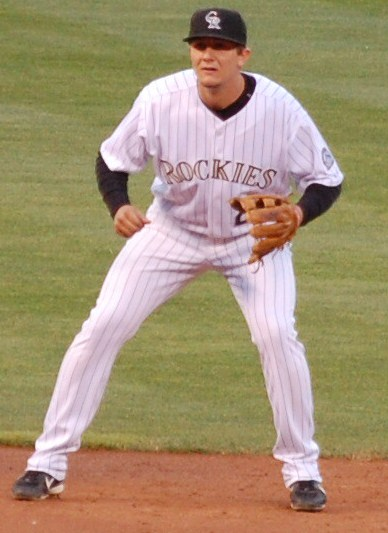
Troy Tulowitzki about to field his position (shortstop)

Tulowitzki was named the NL Rookie of the Month for August. On September 10, 2007, Tulowitzki hit his 20th home run of the season, which set the record for most home runs in a single season by a National League rookie shortstop. The previous record was 19, held by Ernie Banks. Tulowitzki hit his first career grand slam on September 29, 2007, in an 11–1 home win over the Arizona Diamondbacks, off of Dustin Nippert. He ended with 24 home runs on the season.

In the 2007 season, Tulowitzki ranked first among NL rookies in at bats (609), plate appearances (678), games (155), hits (177), doubles (33), runs (104), total bases (292), walks (57) and RBIs (99; two ahead of Ryan Braun, in 158 more at bats than Braun). Tulowitzki's 99 RBIs led all National League shortstops (he was three short of a tie for the MLB lead, held by Detroit Tigers shortstop Carlos Guillén). He set an MLB single-season record in RBIs for a rookie shortstop. He finished second behind Braun in OBP (.359). He was third behind Braun and Hunter Pence in batting average (.291), slugging percentage (.479), OPS (.838) and triples (5). Tulowitzki was also third behind Braun and Chris Young in home runs (24) and extra base hits (62), and tied for ninth in stolen bases (7).

Tulowitzki tied Young, Rajai Davis and Norris Hopper for the lead among all NL rookies in caught stealing (6), was second to Carlos Ruiz in grounding into double plays (14, which was one more — with 158 more at bats — than third place Braun) and second behind Young in strikeouts (130; leading all NL shortstops). However, Tulowitzki had the third lowest strikeout ratio (21.3%) out of all rookies with at least 400 at-bats, behind Kevin Kouzmanoff (19.4%) and Pence (20.8%). He batted .320 with a .554 slugging percentage and 15 home runs at mile-high Coors Field, but hit only .256 with a .393 slugging percentage and nine home runs in away games. However, one of the reasons for any substantial differences in home and road splits for Rockies batters is that they have to make adjustments in how they see pitches away from Coors Field — particularly breaking balls, such as sliders and curveballs — since those pitches act differently at Coors Field than on the road.

Team veterans alerted Tulowitzki every time Braun, his chief rival for rookie of the year honors, hit a home run.

Tulowitzki came in second in the race for National League Rookie of the Year. The award was voted on by 32 members of the Baseball Writers' Association of America, two from each National League city. Braun beat Tulowitzki, 128 points to 126 points, which was the closest voting in the NL since the current system was adopted in 1980. Tulowitzki also lost to Braun in the vote for the 2007 NL Sporting News Rookie of the Year Award, which was voted on by 488 major league players and 30 managers. He lost out to Braun for the 2007 Baseball America Rookie of the Year Award, in the vote for the 2007 Players Choice NL Most Outstanding Rookie by their fellow major league players, Fans voted Tulowitzki the This Year in Baseball Rookie of the Year, with 27.6% of the vote, ahead of Boston Red Sox second baseman Dustin Pedroia (26.3%) and Braun (22.3%). Tulowitzki was selected to the 2007 Topps Major League Rookie All-Star Team.

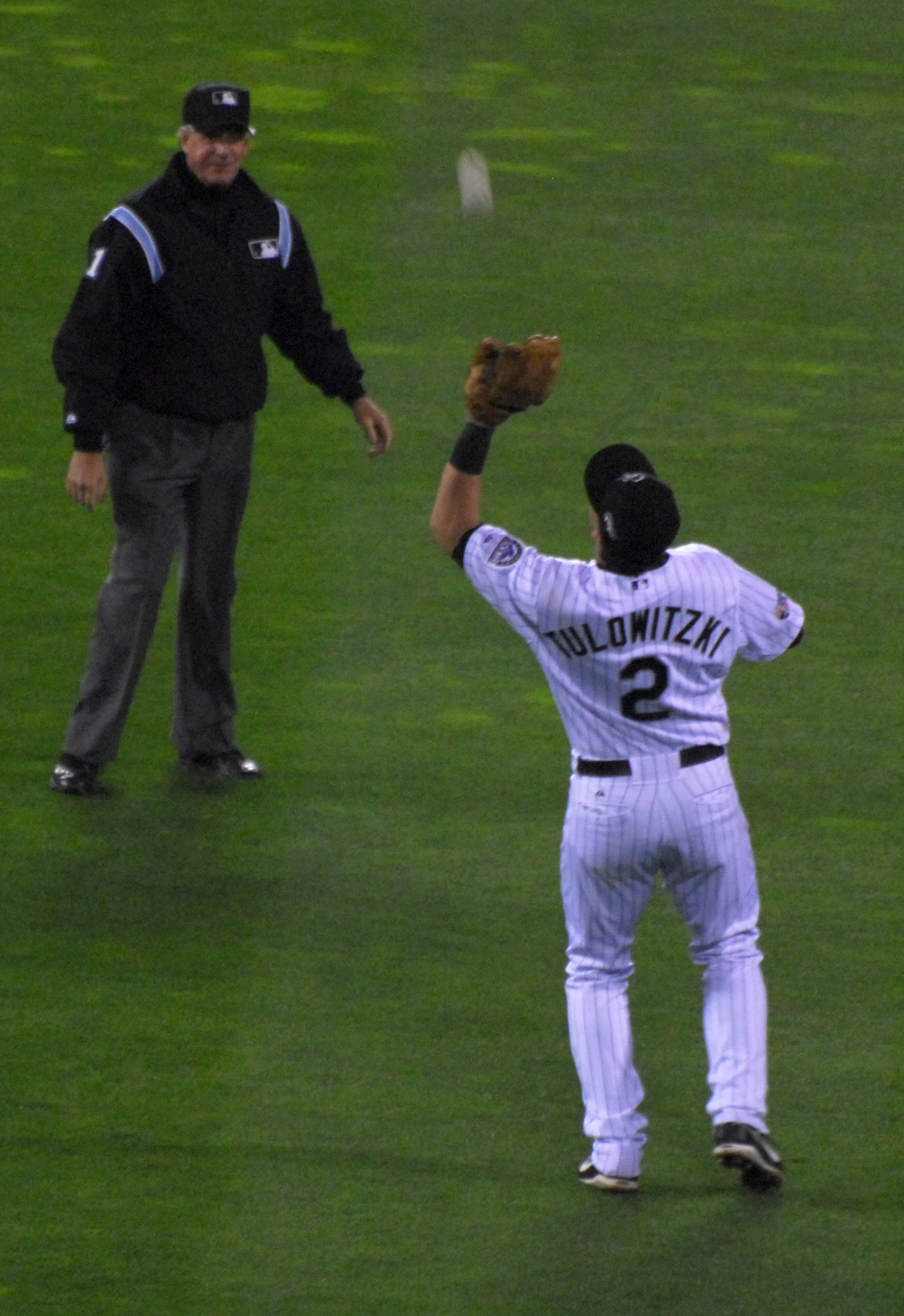
Tulowitzki catching a pop-up in game four of the 2007 World Series

On October 1, 2007, in the one-game Wild Card tie-breaker against the San Diego Padres, Tulowitzki went 4-for-7 with three extra-base hits and scored the tying run in the bottom of the 13th inning. The Rockies won the game 9–8 and entered the playoffs as the NL wild card team. They faced the Philadelphia Phillies in the National League Division Series. On October 4, 2007, in the second game of the series, Tulowitzki and left fielder Matt Holliday hit back-to-back first-pitch homers in the first inning to begin a 10–5 win, and the Rockies headed to Denver with a 2–0 lead in the series. The Rockies went on to complete a three-game sweep of the Phillies, and advanced to the National League Championship Series, in which they swept the Arizona Diamondbacks in four games. Colorado then played the Boston Red Sox in the World Series, which was the first ever World Series appearance in Rockies history. Boston swept Colorado in four games. Tulowitzki batted .195 in the postseason, with a .267 on-base percentage and 15 strikeouts in 41 at-bats.

On January 23, 2008, Tulowitzki signed a six-year, $31-million contract extension with the Rockies. The deal, which also included a club option for 2014, was the largest-ever contract for a player with less than two years experience until Ryan Braun signed an eight-year, $45-million contract extension with the Brewers on May 15, 2008.

On April 29, 2008, in a 3–2 road win over the San Francisco Giants, Tulowitzki tore a left quadriceps tendon during a defensive play in the first inning. He returned to the Rockies, starting at shortstop, on June 20, in a 7–2 home loss against the New York Mets. On July 5, 2008, Tulowitzki went back on the disabled list after cutting his right palm in the previous day's 18–17 home win over the Florida Marlins. The injury occurred in the bottom of the seventh inning when Tulowitzki slammed a maple bat into the ground in frustration. The incident took place after he was taken out of the game in that same inning; however, he noted that the frustration leading up to his injury wasn't due to being taken out, saying, "I was a little bit frustrated, not at the move. If anything, I thought it was the right move. I came in the hallway, grabbed a bat, hit it on the ground and the bat exploded in my hand and cut open my palm running up to my index finger." The cut required 16 stitches, but no damage was done to any tendons or nerves. Tulowitzki returned to the Rockies' lineup, starting at shortstop, on July 21, 2008, in a 16–10 home loss against the Los Angeles Dodgers. He recorded a career-high five hits during the game, as he went 5-for-5 with one RBI. After returning on July 21 he has had six multi-hit games in his past eight games. In 38 games prior to July 21, Tulowitzki had six multi-hit games. Tulowitzki ended the 2008 season with a .263 batting average, eight home runs, and 46 RBIs in 101 games.

==== 2009–2011 ====
On August 10, 2009, Tulowitzki hit for the cycle as part of an 11–5 home win over the Chicago Cubs. He also had a career-high seven RBIs, which tied for the third-most RBIs in MLB history in a game for a player who hit for the cycle. Tulowitzki became the fifth Rockies player to hit for the cycle. He also was the second player in MLB history to hit for the cycle and record an unassisted triple play in a career. Tulowitzki hit a career-high 32 home runs during the season and had a .552 slugging percentage, both of which led all MLB shortstops. He was second in RBIs (92), triples (9), walks (73) and on-base plus slugging percentage (.930). He finished fifth in voting by the Baseball Writers' Association of America for National League MVP.

On June 17, 2010, Tulowitzki fractured his wrist after being hit by a pitch from Minnesota Twins reliever Alex Burnett. He was placed on the disabled list the following day.

On July 4, 2010, Tulowitzki was one of two Rockies, along with starting pitcher Ubaldo Jiménez, selected as a National League All-Star to play in the 2010 Major League Baseball All-Star Game at Angel Stadium of Anaheim. It was Tulowitzki's first All-Star appearance, but due to being on the disabled list since June 18 with a fractured wrist, he was replaced by New York Mets shortstop José Reyes. In September, Tulowitzki hit 14 home runs from September 3 through the 18th, garnering him back-to-back NL Player of the Week honors for September 6–12 and 13–19. He also earned his first National League Player of the Month award for his efforts during the month of September, in which he led all MLB players with 15 home runs, 40 RBI, 30 runs scored and an .800 slugging percentage. Only Babe Ruth had just as many or more home runs (17) and RBIs (43) during that month in MLB history.

Tulowitzki finished the 2010 season leading all MLB shortstops in home runs (27), RBIs (95), batting average (.315), on-base percentage (.381), slugging percentage (.568) and on-base plus slugging percentage (.949). He placed fifth in voting for National League MVP for the second consecutive season. Tulowitzki picked up his first Silver Slugger Award for his offensive prowess. On the defensive side, he had the best fielding percentage (.984) and range factor (5.06) among all shortstops in the National League. He earned his second Fielding Bible Award and first Gold Glove at shortstop. He was also ESPN's 2010 Web Gem champion.

On November 29, 2010, Tulowitzki agreed to sign a six-year extension on top of the three years, with a fourth option year, remaining on his contract. The six-year extension was worth around $120 million, making it the second-largest contract ever signed by a Rockies player (behind Todd Helton's nine-year $141.5 million contract).

Tulowitzki was elected by his fellow players as a National League reserve for the 2011 All-Star Game in Phoenix, Arizona, but after an injury to starter José Reyes (who was chosen by fans), Tulowitzki became the NL's starting shortstop. He had one hit during the game, which was a single. Tulowitzki won his second consecutive (third overall) Fielding Bible Award, as the best fielding shortstop in MLB. He also received his second consecutive Gold Glove and Silver Slugger Award.

==== 2012–2015 ====
On April 1, 2012, during a spring training game against the Cleveland Indians, Tulowitzki was hit by a pitch on the arm by former teammate Ubaldo Jiménez. Both Tulowitzki and Jiménez came close to each other while the benches cleared. Jiménez received a five-game suspension and an undisclosed fine. As the season progressed, Tulowitzki injured his left groin on May 30, during a game against the Houston Astros. After going on the disabled list, he aggravated the injury while on a rehab assignment with the Colorado Springs Sky Sox, and underwent surgery to remove scar tissue in the middle of June. He hoped to return for the end of the season, playing a few games for the Rockies' Double-A affiliate the Tulsa Drillers, but ultimately did not return to the major league side that year. For the season, was limited to 47 games, in which he batted .287 with eight home runs and 27 RBIs.

On June 13, 2013, Tulowitzki suffered a fractured right rib in a 5–4 loss to the Nationals. He was placed on the 15-day disabled list and missed 25 games. Despite the injury, Tulowitzki was selected for the 2013 Major League Baseball All-Star Game. Teammates Carlos González and Michael Cuddyer were also selected, and all three players were in the starting lineup for the National League. Tulowitzki hit .312 in 126 games in 2013, with 25 home runs and 82 RBIs.

Tulowitzki started 2014 by batting .364 in April with seven home runs, nine doubles, and 22 RBIs. His hot start earned him the NL Player of the Month honors for April. On May 3, Tulowitzki singled for his 1,000th career hit in a game against the New York Mets. He injured his left hip during a July 19 game, and underwent labral repair surgery on August 15, which ended his season. Tulowitzki finished the campaign with a .340 batting average in 91 games played. Despite his injury-shortened season, he hit 21 home runs with 58 RBI.

Tulowitzki made his fifth All-Star team in 2015 as a replacement for the injured Dee Gordon. He batted .300 with 12 home runs and 53 RBIs in 87 games with the Rockies before being traded.

=== Toronto Blue Jays (2015–2017) ===
==== Rest of 2015 ====
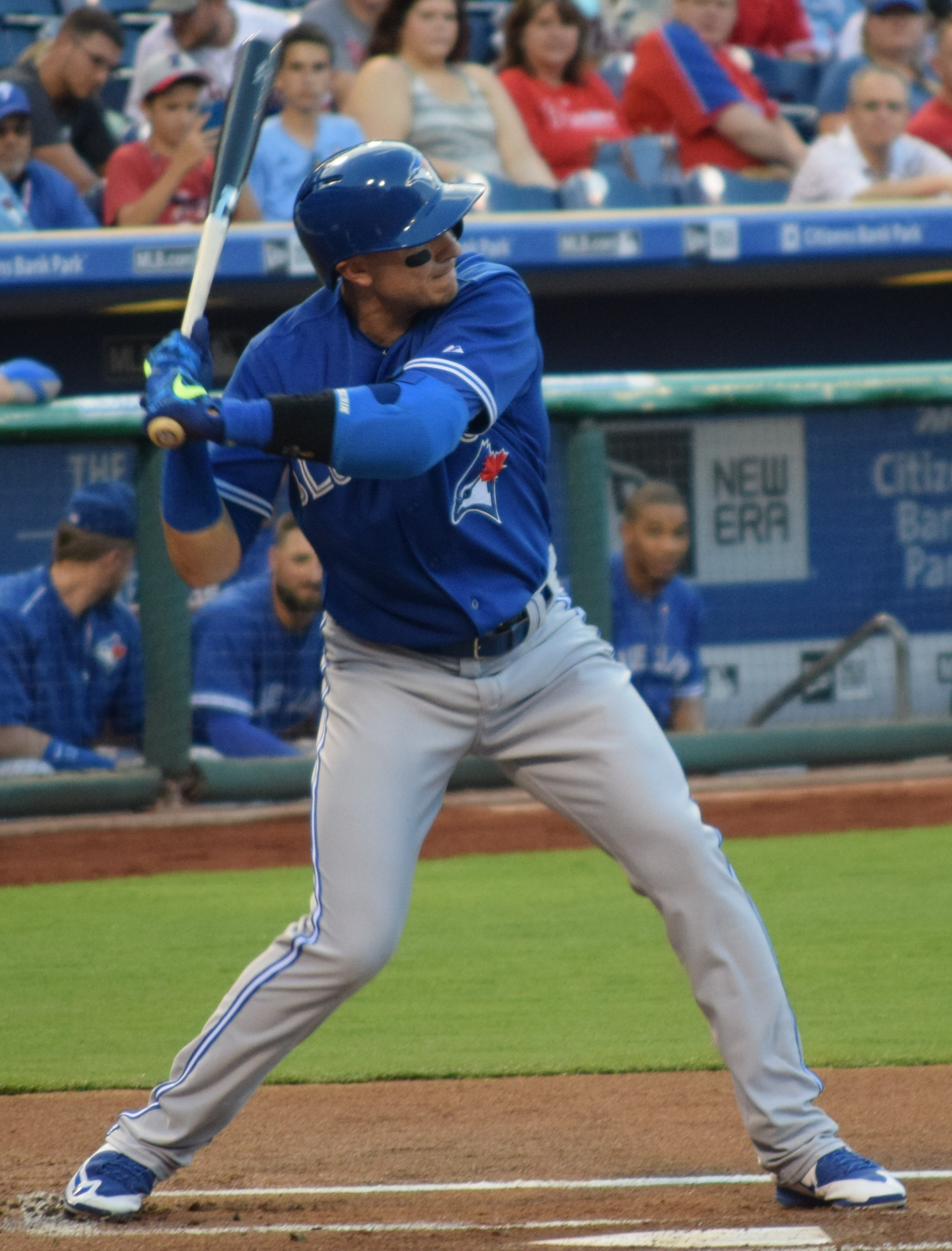
Tulowitzki batting on August 19, 2015

On July 28, 2015, Tulowitzki was traded, along with teammate LaTroy Hawkins, to the Toronto Blue Jays in exchange for José Reyes, Jeff Hoffman, Miguel Castro and Jesús Tinoco. Upon being informed of the trade during the middle of the ninth inning of a game at the Chicago Cubs, as Blue Jays and Rockies management had kept negotiations secret from the media, Tulowitzki reportedly yelled at Rockies general manager Jeff Bridich and vowed never to speak to him or other members of the Rockies front office. Tulowitzki expressed mixed emotions about the trade, but stated, "I get the chance to play for a contender, and maybe this will revive my career a little bit."

Tulowitzki made his debut with the Blue Jays on July 29, and went 3-for-5 with a home run, two doubles, three RBIs and three runs scored. During a game against the New York Yankees on September 12, Tulowitzki collided with teammate Kevin Pillar while backpedaling to catch a fly ball in centerfield, and had to leave the game. He was expected to be out for a minimum of 2–3 weeks due to a cracked shoulder blade. Tulowitzki returned to the lineup shortly before the end of the season after missing 18 games, and in total, appeared in 41 games for the Blue Jays in 2015, batting .239 with five home runs and 17 RBIs. The Blue Jays had a record of 50–51 and stood at fourth place in the AL East, but Tulowitzki's arrival helped the Jays go 43–18 for the rest of the regular season to capture the AL East Division title and earn their first playoff berth since 1993.

Tulowitzki played in all 5 games of the 2015 American League Division Series, batting .095 with one home run and four RBIs. In the third game of the 2015 American League Championship Series, Tulowitzki hit a three-run home run and was later ejected, becoming the first American League player to be ejected from a postseason game since Dwight Gooden in 1998. The Blue Jays won the game, 11–8. The Jays advanced to the American League Championship Series, which was won by the Kansas City Royals in six games.

==== 2016–2018 ====
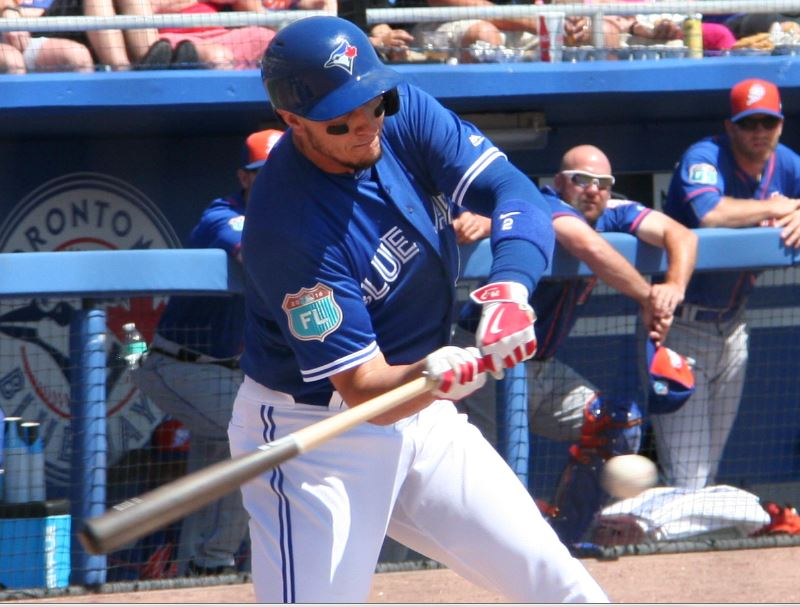
Tulowitzki about to hit a pitch during Spring Training 2016

On May 13, 2016, Tulowitzki hit his 200th career home run in a win over the Texas Rangers. On May 28, he was placed on the 15-day disabled list due to a right quad strain. He was reactivated on June 18, having missed 20 games due to the injury. Tulowitzki struggled in 2016, batting a career low .254 in 131 games, though he also hit 24 home runs with 79 RBIs.

Tulowitzki was placed on the 10-day disabled list on April 22, 2017, after suffering a hamstring injury. He returned to the lineup on May 26 after missing 31 games. On July 29, Tulowitzki was placed back on the disabled list with a sprained right ankle, which he injured running to first base. He was later diagnosed with ligament damage. On August 9, he was moved to the 60-day disabled list, ruling him out for the season. In 66 games, Tulowitzki hit .249 with seven home runs and 26 RBIs.

Early in 2018 spring training, it was announced that Tulowitzki had a bone spur in his right ankle, and that he would miss the start of the Grapefruit League season. On March 4, John Gibbons stated Tulowitzki was unlikely to be ready for Opening Day. Tulowitzki did not appear in any spring training games, and was placed on the 60-day disabled list to begin the year. On March 30, it was announced that his bone spurs required surgery. He missed the entire 2018 season. On December 11, 2018, Tulowitzki was released by the Blue Jays. The Blue Jays still owed $38 million on the two remaining years of Tulowitzki's contract.

=== New York Yankees (2019) ===
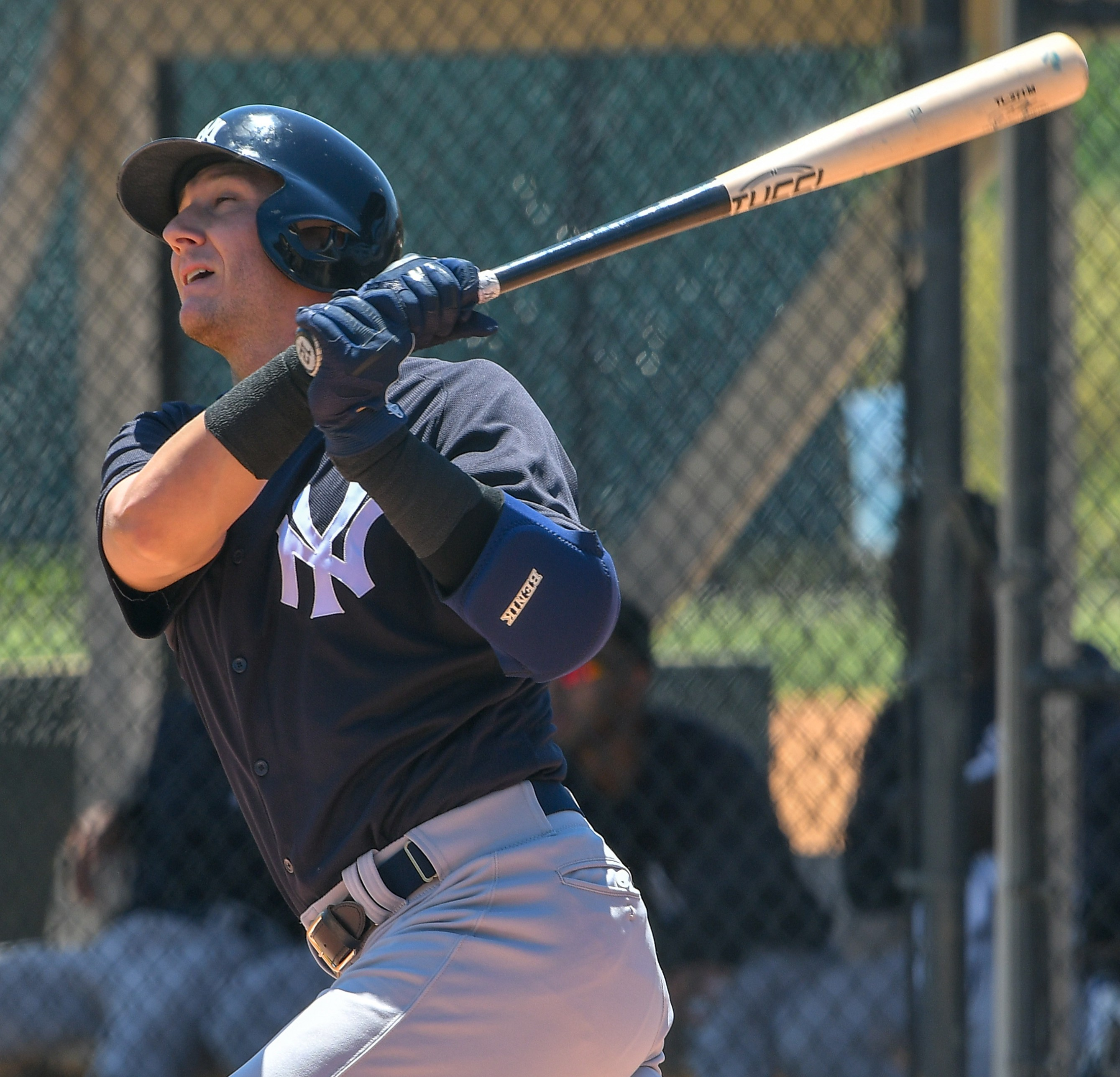
Tulowitzki with the Yankees in April 2019

On January 4, 2019, Tulowitzki signed a one-year contract with the New York Yankees. They paid him the major league minimum salary of $555,000 and the contract included a no-trade clause. He won the starting shortstop job with Didi Gregorius injured for the start of the season.

He hit his first home run as a Yankee and also his last professional home run, a solo shot in the bottom of the 9th inning, against Baltimore Orioles' and former Yankees left-handed reliever Richard Bleier on March 30, 2019.

After playing in five games to begin the season, he went on the IL with a left calf strain. On June 7, he was transferred to the 60-day injured list.

On July 25, Tulowitzki announced his retirement from Major League Baseball through a statement by the Yankees.

=== Career statistics ===
In 1291 games over 13 seasons, Tulowitzki posted a .290 batting average (1391-for-4804) with 762 runs scored, 264 doubles, 24 triples, 225 home runs, 780 RBI, 57 stolen bases, 511 walks, .361 on-base percentage, and .495 slugging percentage. Defensively, he recorded a .985 fielding percentage playing every inning of his MLB career at shortstop. He is virtually tied with Omar Vizquel for highest all-time career fielding percentage as a shortstop. In 35 postseason games, he hit just .213 with 4 home runs and 22 RBI but handled 146 total chances (58 putouts, 88 assists) without an error for a perfect 1.000 fielding percentage in postseason play.

== Coaching career ==
Troy Tulowitzki
Current position
- Title: Assistant Coach
- Team: Texas
- Conference: SEC

Biographical details
- Born: October 10, 1984 (age 42); Santa Clara, California, U.S.

Coaching career (HC unless noted)
- 2020–2022: Texas (assistant)
- 2025–present: Texas (assistant)

Administrative career (AD unless noted)
- 2024: Texas (Dir. PD)

Upon retiring as a player, Tulowitzki was hired by the Texas Longhorns as an assistant coach. With the Longhorns, he specialized as a hitting and infield coach. In 2021, he coached the USA Baseball collegiate baseball team. He briefly decided to leave the Longhorns after four seasons with the team, but rejoined after coach Jim Schlossnagle was hired and the hitting coach spot became available.

== Personal life ==
Tulowitzki is of Polish descent. He has a sister, Tiffany, who plays softball, and a brother, Tyler, who played baseball for San Francisco State University.

Tulowitzki's favorite player growing up was Derek Jeter. His jersey number with the Rockies and Blue Jays was No. 2, due to his admiration of Jeter.

In November 2009, Tulowitzki married his high school sweetheart, Danyll Gammon, in Portola Valley, California. In January 2014, the Tulowitzkis welcomed a son. They reside in Austin, Texas.

== Awards and honors ==
- 5× National League All-Star selection (2010, 2011, 2013, 2014, 2015)
- 2× National League Gold Glove: Shortstop (2010, 2011)
- 2× National League Silver Slugger Award: Shortstop (2010, 2011)
- National League Player of the Month (September 2010)
- 4× National League Player of the Week (August 6–12, 2007, September 14–20, 2009, September 6–12, 2010, September 13–19, 2010)
- 3× Fielding Bible Award: Shortstop (2007, 2010, 2011)
- This Year in Baseball Rookie of the Year (2007)
- Topps Major League Rookie All-Star Team: Shortstop (2007)
- National League Rookie of the Month (August 2007)
- Colorado Rockies Minor League Player of the Year (2006)
- All-Star Futures Game (2006)
- Big West Conference All-Star: Shortstop (2004, 2005)
- Palo Alto Regional MVP: 2004 NCAA Division I baseball tournament

== See also ==
- List of largest sports contracts
- List of Major League Baseball players to hit for the cycle
- List of Major League Baseball career home run leaders

Awards and achievements
Preceded by Francisco Liriano	This Year in Baseball Rookie of the Year; 2007	Succeeded by Evan Longoria
Preceded by Ryan Braun	National League Rookie of the Month; August 2007	Succeeded by James Loney
Preceded by Melky Cabrera	Hitting for the cycle August 10, 2009	Succeeded by Félix Pie
