= Omar Quintanilla =

American baseball player (born 1981)

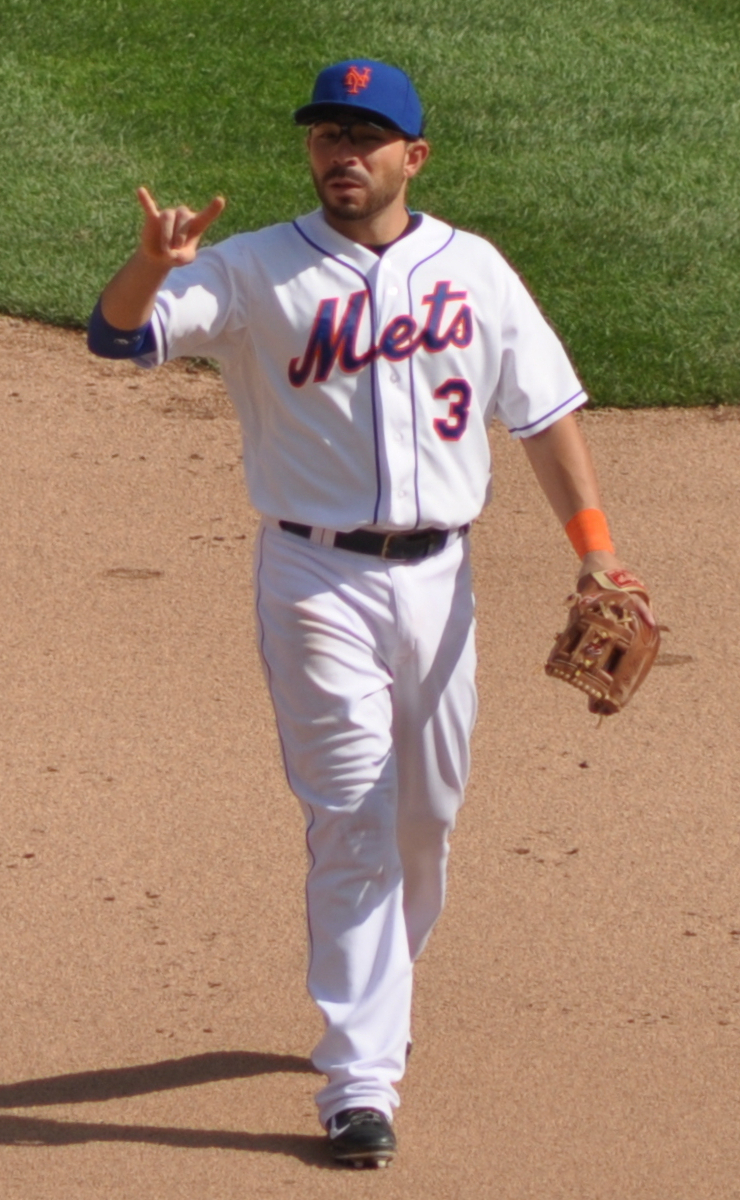
- Quintanilla with the New York Mets
- Second baseman / Shortstop
- Born: October 24, 1981 (age 45); El Paso, Texas, U.S.
- Batted: Left Threw: Right

MLB debut
- July 31, 2005, for the Colorado Rockies

Last MLB appearance
- May 7, 2014, for the New York Mets

MLB statistics
- Batting average: .220
- Home runs: 8
- Runs batted in: 74
- Stats at Baseball Reference

Teams
- Colorado Rockies (2005–2009); Texas Rangers (2011); New York Mets (2012); Baltimore Orioles (2012); New York Mets (2013–2014)

Omar Quintanilla (born October 24, 1981) is an American former professional baseball infielder. He played in Major League Baseball (MLB) for the Colorado Rockies (2005–2009), Texas Rangers (2011), New York Mets (2012, 2013–2014), and Baltimore Orioles (2012).

== Early life ==
Quintanilla attended Socorro High School in El Paso, Texas, where he played with teammate DR Melo. Quintanilla led the city of El Paso in home runs, RBI, and was elected to the Texas All-State shortstop. After graduating, he received a scholarship to the University of Texas, Austin, where he played for the Texas Longhorns baseball team. Quintanilla played second base, third base, and shortstop, and appeared in two national championship games, winning one. In 2002, he played collegiate summer baseball for the Cotuit Kettleers of the Cape Cod Baseball League.

== Professional career ==
=== Oakland Athletics ===
Quintanilla was drafted by the Oakland Athletics in the first round (33rd overall) of the 2003 Major League Baseball draft. In 2003, he played for the Vancouver Canadians of the Low-A Northwest League and High-A Modesto A's of the High-A California League, batting .358 in 40 games. Quintanilla started 2004 with Modesto as the Athletics' seventh ranked prospect and after hitting .315 received a late-season promotion to the Midland RockHounds for the Double-A Texas League. He began 2005 with Midland as the A's 8th ranked prospect.

=== Colorado Rockies ===
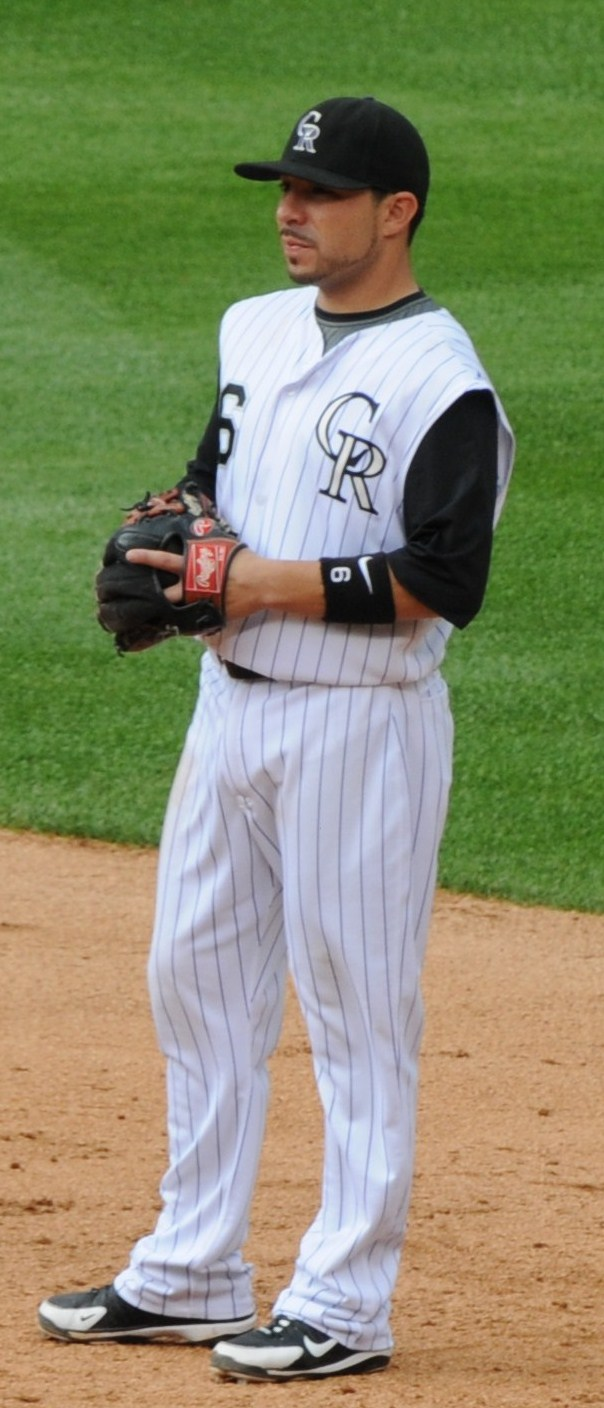
Quintanilla with the Colorado Rockies in 2008

On July 15, 2005, Quintanilla was traded along with outfielder Eric Byrnes to the Colorado Rockies in exchange for pitchers Joe Kennedy and Jay Witasick. The Rockies subsequently assigned him to the Colorado Springs Sky Sox of the Triple-A Pacific Coast League (PCL). and promoted him to the majors in late July. He made his debut on July 31 and went 1–3. In each of the next three seasons, Quintanilla began the season with Triple-A Colorado Springs and was promoted to the majors at least once each season. In limited at-bats, he had his highest batting average in 2008 at .238.

The Office of the Commissioner of Baseball announced August 11, 2010, that Quintanilla had received a 50-game suspension after testing positive for Methylhexaneamine, a performance-enhancing substance, in violation of the Minor League Drug Prevention and Treatment Program.

=== Texas Rangers ===
On December 4, 2010, Quintanilla signed a minor league contract with the Texas Rangers. On July 8, 2011, he had his contract purchased by Texas after hitting .298 in 51 games with Round Rock Express of the PCL. On September 1, Quintanilla was removed from the 40-man roster and sent outright to Round Rock, but rejected the assignment and elected free agency. Overall with the Rangers, he hit .045 in 11 games, with two RBI.

=== New York Mets ===
On January 3, 2012, Quintanilla signed a minor league contract with the New York Mets. On May 29, Quintanilla's contract was purchased by the New York Mets from Buffalo Bisons Triple-A International League after hitting .282 in 48 games. He first saw big-league action that same night, going 3-for-4 with 2 doubles in his debut against the Philadelphia Phillies at Citi Field. On June 1, Quintanilla started at shortstop on the first ever no-hitter in New York Mets history thrown by Johan Santana, as the team shut out the St Louis Cardinals 8–0. He was designated for assignment on July 17.

=== Baltimore Orioles ===
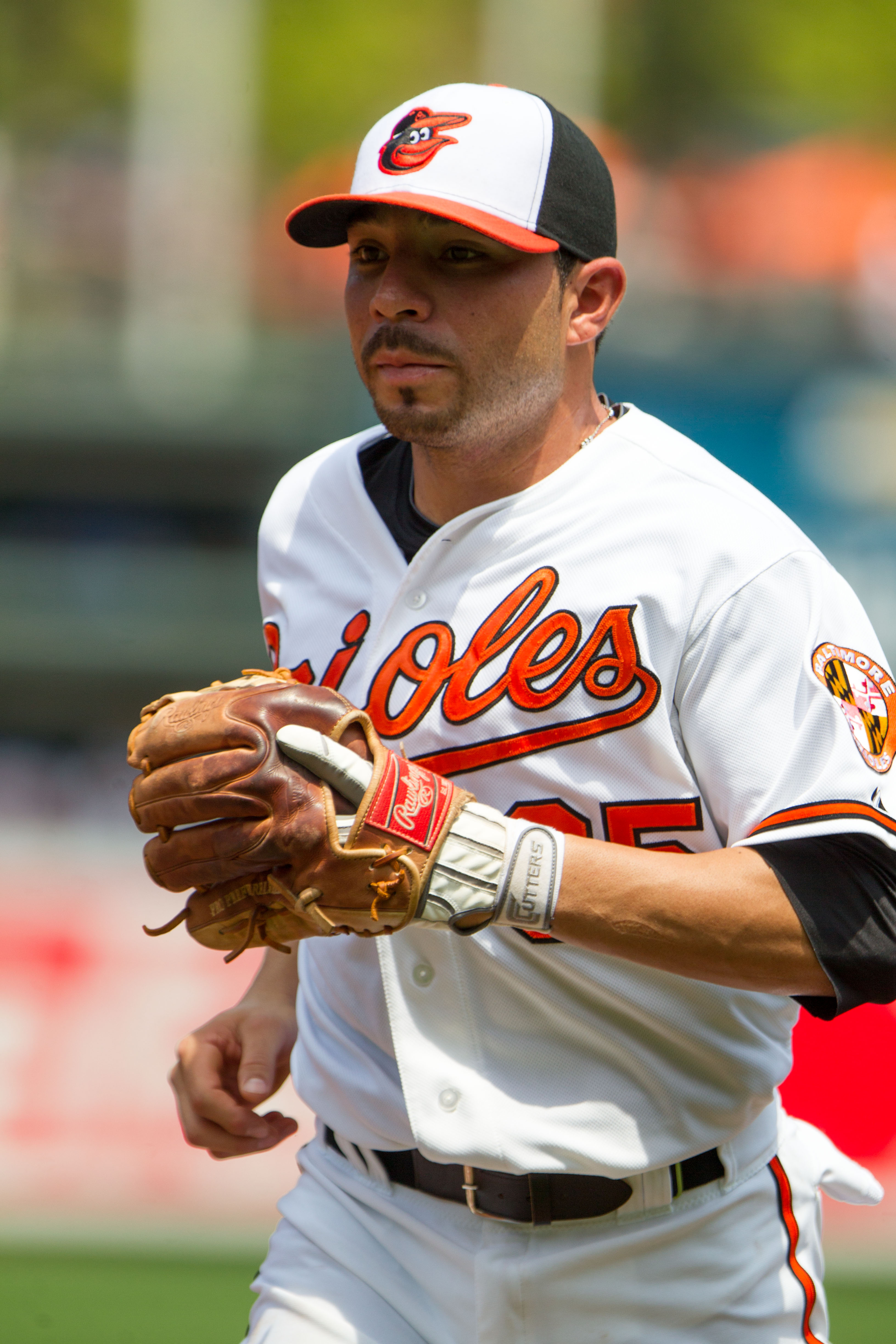
Quintanilla playing for the Baltimore Orioles in 2012

On July 20, 2012, Quintanilla was traded to the Baltimore Orioles in exchange for financial considerations. In 36 appearances for Baltimore, he primarily played 2nd base, and batted .232/.284/.354 with three home runs and 12 RBI.

=== New York Mets (second stint) ===
On January 5, 2013, Quintanilla signed a minor league contract with the New York Mets that included an invitation to spring training. His contract was purchased and he was subsequently called up on May 30, when shortstop Ruben Tejada was placed on the 15-day disabled list. In 95 appearances for the Mets, Quintanilla batted .222/.306/.283 with two home runs, 21 RBI, and two stolen bases. He became a free agent on December 2, after being non-tendered.

On January 18, 2014, Quintanilla re-signed with the Mets organization on a minor league contract. On March 29, the Mets selected Quintanilla's contract after he made the team's Opening Day roster. In 15 games for New York, he went 6-for-29 (.207) with 3 RBI. On May 8, Quintanilla was designated for assignment by the Mets. He elected free agency on October 1.

=== Colorado Rockies (second stint) ===
On January 30, 2015, Quintanilla signed a minor league contract with the Colorado Rockies. He was released on June 15, after appearing in only two games for the High-A Modesto Nuts.

=== Toros de Tijuana ===
On December 2, 2015, Quintanilla signed with the Toros de Tijuana of the Mexican League. In 7 games for Tijuana in 2016, he went 5-for-21 (.238) with one home run, three RBI, and one stolen base.

Quintanilla played in 2 games for the Toros in 2017, going 0-for-2 with 1 walk. He became a free agent following the season.
