= Jayson Nix =

American baseball player (born 1982)

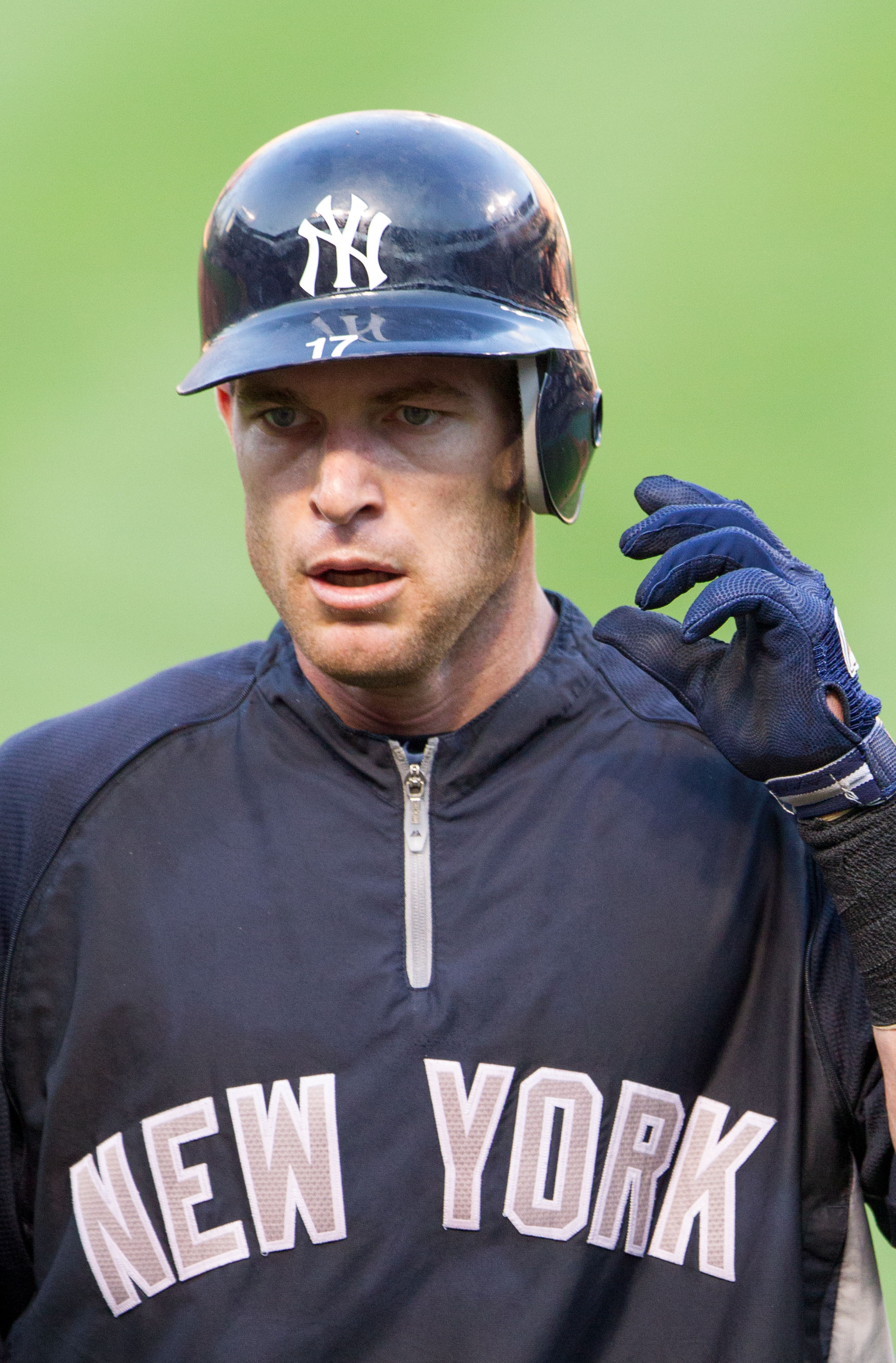
- Nix with the New York Yankees in 2012
- Infielder / Coach
- Born: August 26, 1982 (age 44); Dallas, Texas, U.S.
- Batted: Right Threw: Right

MLB debut
- April 1, 2008, for the Colorado Rockies

Last MLB appearance
- September 30, 2014, for the Kansas City Royals

MLB statistics
- Batting average: .212
- Home runs: 38
- Runs batted in: 130
- Stats at Baseball Reference

Teams
- As player: Colorado Rockies (2008); Chicago White Sox (2009–2010); Cleveland Indians (2010); Toronto Blue Jays (2011); New York Yankees (2012–2013); Philadelphia Phillies (2014); Pittsburgh Pirates (2014); Kansas City Royals (2014); As coach: Los Angeles Angels (2024–2025)

Career highlights and awards
- Baseball World Cup MVP (2007)
Medals
Men's baseball
Representing United States
Olympic Games
Bronze medal – third place	2008 Beijing	National Team
Baseball World Cup
Gold medal – first place	2007 Tianmu	National Team

Jayson Truitt Edward Nix (born August 26, 1982) is an American former professional baseball utility player. He played in Major League Baseball (MLB) for the Colorado Rockies, Chicago White Sox, Cleveland Indians, Toronto Blue Jays, New York Yankees, Philadelphia Phillies, Pittsburgh Pirates, and Kansas City Royals.

His older brother, Laynce Nix, also played in MLB.

== Early life ==
Nix was born in Dallas, Texas, and still makes his offseason home there. He attended Midland High School in Midland, Texas.

== Professional career ==
The Colorado Rockies selected Nix as a sandwich pick (44th overall) between the first and second rounds of the 2001 Major League Baseball draft as compensation for not signing their first round pick in the 2000 Major League Baseball draft (Matt Harrington).

=== Colorado Rockies ===
Nix began the 2008 season as the Colorado Rockies starting second baseman but over the next month, he saw his playing time diminish. On April 26, 2008, Nix was designated for assignment. He had played in 17 games and batted .111 with no home runs. On April 30 he cleared waivers and was sent outright to Triple-A.

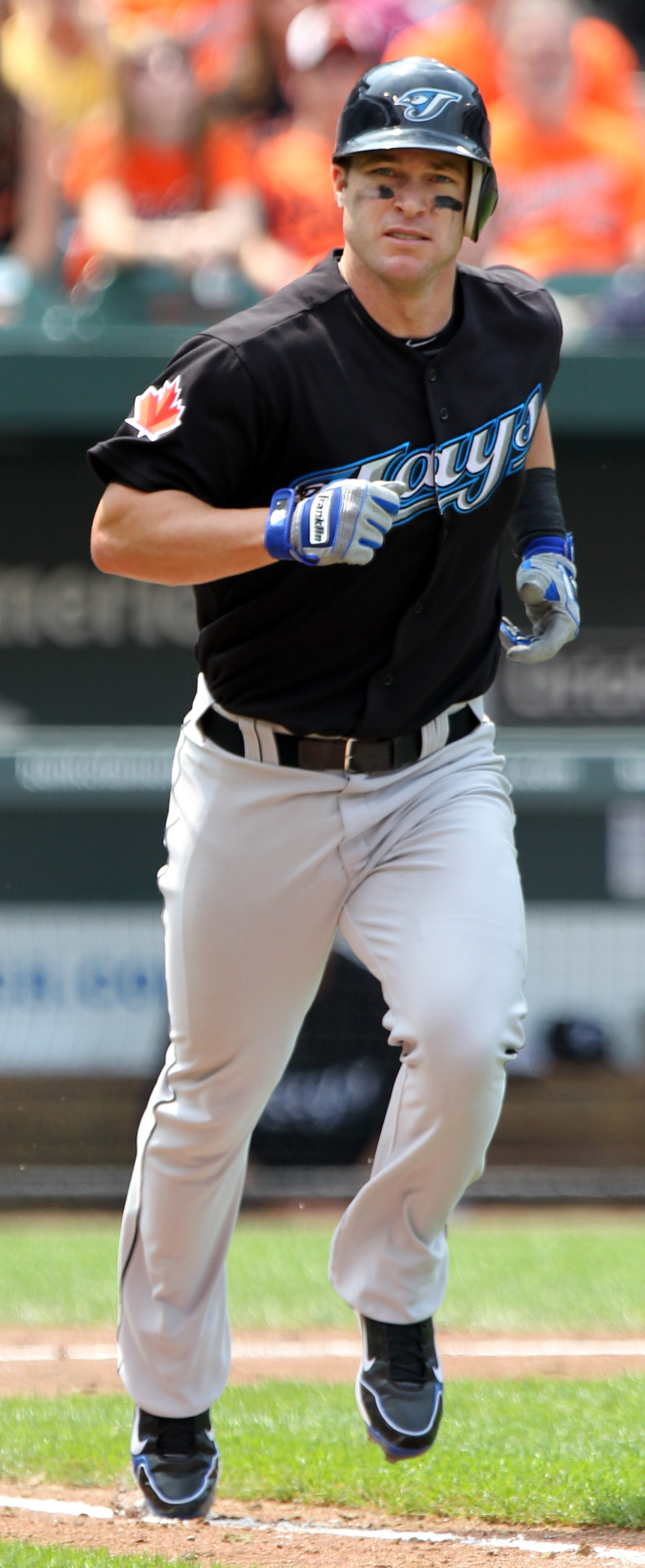
Nix while with the Toronto Blue Jays in 2011.

Nix was batting .300 with 17 home runs and 49 RBI for the Sky Sox in 2008 when his minor league season ended as a result of his being selected for the 2008 USA Olympic Baseball Team.

In the team's third game at the Olympics, against Cuba, Nix hit a solo home run in the eighth inning. While leading off the eleventh inning with runners on first and second as per Olympic rules, Nix fouled a ball off his left eye. He left the game for the hospital and missed the rest of the Beijing Games. Team USA lost, 5–4, to the defending champions in eleven innings.

=== Chicago White Sox ===
On October 28, 2008, Nix signed as a free agent with the Chicago White Sox. On May 7, 2009, Nix hit his 1st career home run off of Armando Galarraga. He followed with his second career home run just five days later. On May 26, Nix homered twice against the Los Angeles Angels of Anaheim. On the same day, his brother, Laynce homered against the Houston Astros. On May 30, 2010 Nix hit his first career grand slam against the Tampa Bay Rays.

On June 18, 2010, he was designated for assignment to make room for prospect infielder Dayán Viciedo.

=== Cleveland Indians ===
On June 24, 2010, Nix was claimed off waivers by the Cleveland Indians, and the team designated Shane Lindsay for assignment to make room for him. Jensen Lewis and Luis Valbuena were sent down to Triple A Columbus.

=== Toronto Blue Jays ===
On March 29, 2011, Nix was traded to the Toronto Blue Jays for future cash considerations. He made his debut on April 2 against the Minnesota Twins, hitting a home run. On April 22 Nix was slid into by Rays second baseman Sean Rodriguez and left the game with a left leg injury. He was placed on the 15-day disabled list for a left leg contusion on April 23. He returned from the disabled list on May 18, playing against the Tampa Bay Rays. He was designated for assignment on July 2. He became a free agent at season's end.

=== New York Yankees ===
Nix signed a minor league contract with the New York Yankees on November 23, 2011. He also received an invitation to spring training.

Nix was called up on May 3, 2012 by the Yankees. Nix filled in as a backup infielder for the Yankees and started several games at shortstop and third base filling in for Derek Jeter and Alex Rodriguez.

Nix was the final out of the 2012 American League Championship Series popping up to first baseman Prince Fielder as the Yankees were swept and eliminated by the Detroit Tigers in 4 games. Nix was placed on the 15-day disabled list on July 3, 2013, due to a hamstring strain. On August 21, Nix was hit by an R. A. Dickey knuckleball and immediately removed from the game with what was later determined to be a broken left hand. On August 22, Nix was placed on the 15-day disabled list. On September 1, 2013 he was transferred to the 60-day disabled list. After the season, Nix was non-tendered by the Yankees, making him a free agent.

=== Philadelphia Phillies ===
On January 9, 2014, Nix signed a minor league deal with the Tampa Bay Rays. He was traded to the Philadelphia Phillies for cash considerations on March 28, 2014. He was outrighted to the Lehigh Valley IronPigs on May 12, but refused the assignment on May 13 and became a free agent.

=== Tampa Bay Rays ===
On May 16, 2014, Nix signed a minor league deal with the Tampa Bay Rays. He was to report to the Triple-A Durham Bulls, and would be able to opt out of the contract if not on the major league roster by July 15. Nix was released on August 1, 2014.

=== Pittsburgh Pirates ===
On August 3, 2014, Nix was signed by the Pittsburgh Pirates. Nix was designated for assignment by the Pirates on August 25, 2014.

=== Kansas City Royals ===
On August 28, Nix was claimed off waivers by the Kansas City Royals.

=== Baltimore Orioles ===
On February 17, 2015, Nix signed a minor league contract with the Baltimore Orioles.

=== Return to Philadelphia Phillies ===
On May 16, 2015, Nix was traded to the Philadelphia Phillies for cash considerations. He was released on June 23.

== International career ==
Nix played on the United States national baseball team at the IBAF 2007 Baseball World Cup. He hit .387 over the course of the tournament, with nine runs scored, six RBI, two home runs, 13 putouts, 26 assists, and one error. Nix was also named to the tournament all-star team at second base, along with teammate Colby Rasmus (outfield). He won the USA Baseball Richard W. "Dick" Case Player of the Year Award in 2007.

== Post-playing career ==
=== Los Angeles Angels ===
On February 25, 2022, the Los Angeles Angels promoted Nix to minor league assistant field coordinator after serving as a coach for the Arizona Complex League Angels in 2021. In January 2024, Nix joined the Angels' coaching staff as an assistant coach. He was not retained following the 2025 season.

=== Chicago White Sox ===
On January 22, 2026, Nix was announced as the manager for the Kannapolis Cannon Ballers, the Single-A affiliate of the Chicago White Sox.
