= 2008 Los Angeles Dodgers season =

2008 Los Angeles Dodgers
- National League West champions
- League: National League
- Division: West
- Ballpark: Dodger Stadium
- City: Los Angeles
- Record: 84–78 (.519)
- Divisional place: 1st
- Owners: Frank McCourt
- President: Jamie McCourt
- General managers: Ned Colletti
- Managers: Joe Torre
- Television: FSN Prime Ticket; KCAL (9); Vin Scully, Charley Steiner, Steve Lyons
- Radio: KABC; Vin Scully, Rick Monday, Charley Steiner KHJ; Jaime Jarrín, Pepe Yñiguez, Fernando Valenzuela

The 2008 Los Angeles Dodgers season was the 119th season for the Los Angeles Dodgers franchise in Major League Baseball (MLB), their 51st season in Los Angeles, California, and their 47th season playing their home games at Dodger Stadium.

The Dodgers celebrated their Golden Anniversary in Southern California under new manager Joe Torre as they won the National League West for the first time since 2004, and returned to the postseason after missing the playoffs in 2007. The Dodgers did not peak until September when the won 17–8, which was highlighted by the acquisition of superstar outfielder Manny Ramirez. Ramirez hit .396 with 17 HRs in 53 games after the trade on July 31. They swept the Chicago Cubs in the NLDS to advance to the NLCS. It was their first playoff series win since 1988 when they went on to win the World Series. However, they lost to the Philadelphia Phillies in five games in the NLCS.

== Season standings ==
=== National League West ===
NL West
| Team | W | L | Pct. | GB | Home | Road |
|---|---|---|---|---|---|---|
| Los Angeles Dodgers | 84 | 78 | .519 | — | 48‍–‍33 | 36‍–‍45 |
| Arizona Diamondbacks | 82 | 80 | .506 | 2 | 48‍–‍33 | 34‍–‍47 |
| Colorado Rockies | 74 | 88 | .457 | 10 | 43‍–‍38 | 31‍–‍50 |
| San Francisco Giants | 72 | 90 | .444 | 12 | 37‍–‍44 | 35‍–‍46 |
| San Diego Padres | 63 | 99 | .389 | 21 | 35‍–‍46 | 28‍–‍53 |

=== Record vs. opponents ===
2008 National League record Source: MLB Standings Grid – 2008
| Team | AZ | ATL | CHC | CIN | COL | FLA | HOU | LAD | MIL | NYM | PHI | PIT | SD | SF | STL | WAS | AL |
|---|---|---|---|---|---|---|---|---|---|---|---|---|---|---|---|---|---|
| Arizona | – | 3–5 | 2–4 | 2–4 | 15–3 | 2–7 | 4–2 | 8–10 | 2–5 | 3–3 | 3–4 | 4–3 | 10–8 | 11–7 | 3–4 | 4–2 | 6–9 |
| Atlanta | 5–3 | – | 0–6 | 3–3 | 4–3 | 10–8 | 3–3 | 4–2 | 3–6 | 11–7 | 4–14 | 2–5 | 5–1 | 2–5 | 2–5 | 6–12 | 8–7 |
| Chicago | 4–2 | 6–0 | – | 8–7 | 5–1 | 4–3 | 8–9 | 5–2 | 9–7 | 4–2 | 3–4 | 14–4 | 5–2 | 4–3 | 9–6 | 3–3 | 6–9 |
| Cincinnati | 4–2 | 3–3 | 7–8 | – | 1–5 | 6–2 | 3–12 | 1–7 | 10–8 | 3–4 | 3–5 | 6–9 | 4–3 | 5–1 | 5–10 | 4–3 | 9–6 |
| Colorado | 3–15 | 3–4 | 1–5 | 5–1 | – | 5–3 | 3–3 | 8–10 | 4–3 | 3–6 | 0–5 | 5–2 | 9–9 | 11–7 | 3–4 | 4–3 | 7–8 |
| Florida | 7–2 | 8–10 | 3–4 | 2–6 | 3–5 | – | 4–2 | 3–4 | 5–1 | 8–10 | 10–8 | 3–2 | 4–2 | 3–3 | 2–5 | 14–3 | 5–10 |
| Houston | 2–4 | 3–3 | 9–8 | 12–3 | 3–3 | 2–4 | – | 4–3 | 7–8 | 5–2 | 3–4 | 8–8 | 3–3 | 7–1 | 7–8 | 4–2 | 7–11 |
| Los Angeles | 10–8 | 2–4 | 2–5 | 7–1 | 10–8 | 4–3 | 3–4 | – | 4–2 | 3–4 | 4–4 | 5–2 | 11–7 | 9–9 | 2–4 | 3–3 | 5–10 |
| Milwaukee | 5–2 | 6–3 | 7–9 | 8–10 | 3–4 | 1–5 | 8–7 | 2–4 | – | 2–4 | 1–5 | 14–1 | 4–3 | 6–0 | 10–5 | 6–2 | 7–8 |
| New York | 3–3 | 7–11 | 2–4 | 4–3 | 6–3 | 10–8 | 2–5 | 4–3 | 4–2 | – | 11–7 | 4–3 | 2–5 | 5–1 | 4–3 | 12–6 | 9–6 |
| Philadelphia | 4–3 | 14–4 | 4–3 | 5–3 | 5–0 | 8–10 | 4–3 | 4–4 | 5–1 | 7–11 | – | 4–2 | 4–2 | 3–3 | 5–4 | 12–6 | 4–11 |
| Pittsburgh | 3–4 | 5–2 | 4–14 | 9–6 | 2–5 | 2–3 | 8–8 | 2–5 | 1–14 | 3–4 | 2–4 | – | 3–4 | 4–2 | 10–7 | 3–4 | 6–9 |
| San Diego | 8–10 | 1–5 | 2–5 | 3–4 | 9–9 | 2–4 | 3–3 | 7–11 | 3–4 | 5–2 | 2–4 | 4–3 | – | 5–13 | 1–6 | 5–1 | 3–15 |
| San Francisco | 7–11 | 5–2 | 3–4 | 1–5 | 7–11 | 3–3 | 1–7 | 9–9 | 0–6 | 1–5 | 3–3 | 2–4 | 13–5 | – | 4–3 | 7–0 | 6–12 |
| St. Louis | 4–3 | 5–2 | 6–9 | 10–5 | 4–3 | 5–2 | 8–7 | 4–2 | 5–10 | 3–4 | 4–5 | 7–10 | 6–1 | 3–4 | – | 5–1 | 7–8 |
| Washington | 2–4 | 12–6 | 3–3 | 3–4 | 3–4 | 3–14 | 2–4 | 3–3 | 2–6 | 6–12 | 6–12 | 4–3 | 1–5 | 0–7 | 1–5 | – | 8–10 |

== Opening Day starters ==
Opening Day starters
| Name | Position |
|---|---|
| Rafael Furcal | Shortstop |
| Andre Ethier | Left fielder |
| Matt Kemp | Right fielder |
| Jeff Kent | Second baseman |
| Andruw Jones | Center fielder |
| Russell Martin | Catcher |
| James Loney | First baseman |
| Blake DeWitt | Third baseman |
| Brad Penny | Starting pitcher |

=== Notable transactions ===
- June 6, 2008, Acquired Ángel Berroa from the Kansas City Royals for Juan Rivera and cash.
- July 28, 2008, Acquired Casey Blake from the Cleveland Indians for Carlos Santana and Jon Meloan.
- July 31, 2008, Acquired Manny Ramirez from the Boston Red Sox in a 3-team trade, Andy LaRoche and Bryan Morris went to the Pittsburgh Pirates.
- August 19, 2008, Acquired Greg Maddux from the San Diego Padres for two players to be named later or cash considerations.

== 2008 roster ==
2008 Los Angeles Dodgers
Roster
| Pitchers: 97 Joe Beimel; 58 Chad Billingsley; 43 Yhency Brazobán; 51 Jonathan Broxton; 57 Scott Elbert; 49 Brian Falkenborg; 54 Jason Johnson; 54,22 Clayton Kershaw; 56 Hong-Chih Kuo; 18 Hiroki Kuroda; 21 Esteban Loaiza; 23 Derek Lowe; 36 Greg Maddux; 52 James McDonald; 61 Chan Ho Park; 31 Brad Penny; 45 Scott Proctor; 44 Takashi Saito; 50 Eric Stults; 37 Tanyon Sturtze; 38 Ramón Troncoso; 47 Cory Wade | Catchers: 36,28 Danny Ardoin; 26 Gary Bennett; 49 A. J. Ellis; 55 Russell Martin; Infielders: 13 Ángel Berroa; 30 Casey Blake; 33 Blake DeWitt; 15 Rafael Furcal; 5 Nomar Garciaparra; 14,60 Chin-Lung Hu; 12 Jeff Kent; 28 Andy LaRoche; 7 James Loney; 57 Luis Maza; 14 Pablo Ozuna; 22,21 Mark Sweeney | Outfielders: 16 Andre Ethier; 25 Andruw Jones; 27 Matt Kemp; 9 Juan Pierre; 99 Manny Ramirez; 17 Jason Repko; 13 Terry Tiffee; 49 Delwyn Young | Manager: 6 Joe Torre; Coaches: 10 Larry Bowa (third base); 35 Mariano Duncan (1st base); 41 Mike Easler (hitting); 40 Rick Honeycutt (pitching); 48 Ken Howell (bullpen); 8 Don Mattingly (hitting); 11 Manny Mota; 46 Bob Schaefer (bench) |

== Game log ==
2008 Game Log
March/April (14–13)

| # | Date | Opponent | Score | Win | Loss | Save | Attendance | Record |
|---|---|---|---|---|---|---|---|---|
| 1 | March 31 | Giants | 5–0 | Penny (1–0) | Zito (0–1) | | 56,000 | 1–0 |
| 2 | April 1 | Giants | 3–2 | Saito (1–0) | Yabu (0–1) | | 44,054 | 2–0 |
| 3 | April 2 | Giants | 2–1 | Lincecum (1–0) | Loaiza (0–1) | Wilson (1) | 43,217 | 2–1 |
| 4 | April 4 | @ Padres | 7–1 | Kuroda (1–0) | Thatcher (0–1) | | 42,474 | 3–1 |
| 5 | April 5 | @ Padres | 4–1 | Peavy (2–0) | Penny (1–1) | | 38,819 | 3–2 |
| 6 | April 6 | @ Padres | 3–2 | Broxton (1–0) | Hoffman (0–2) | Saito (1) | 44,165 | 4–2 |
| 7 | April 7 | @ Diamondbacks | 9–3 | Haren (1–0) | Loaiza (0–2) | | 49,507 | 4–3 |
| 8 | April 8 | @ Diamondbacks | 10–5 | Davis (1–1) | Billingsley (0–1) | | 28,973 | 4–4 |
| 9 | April 9 | @ Diamondbacks | 4–3 | Owings (2–0) | Kuroda (0–1) | Lyon (1) | 23,331 | 4–5 |
| 10 | April 11 | Padres | 7–5 | Peavy (3–0) | Penny (1–2) | Hoffman (3) | 54,052 | 4–6 |
| 11 | April 12 | Padres | 11–1 | Lowe (1–0) | Young (1–1) | | 54,955 | 5–6 |
| 12 | April 13 | Padres | 1–0 | Maddux (2–0) | Billingsley (0–2) | Hoffman (4) | 47,357 | 5–7 |
| 13 | April 14 | Pirates | 6–4 | Yates (2–0) | Saito (1–1) | Capps (4) | 37,334 | 5–8 |
| 14 | April 15 | Pirates | 11–2 | Loaiza (1–2) | Morris (0–2) | | 37,896 | 6–8 |
| 15 | April 16 | Pirates | 8–1 | Penny (2–2) | Maholm (0–2) | | 53,629 | 7–8 |
| 16 | April 18 | @ Braves | 6–1 | Ohman (1–0) | Lowe (1–1) | | 38,250 | 7–9 |
| 17 | April 19 | @ Braves | 4–1 | James (1–1) | Billingsley (0–3) | Acosta (1) | 40,451 | 7–10 |
| 18 | April 20 | @ Braves | 6–1 | Jurrjens (2–2) | Kuroda (1–2) | | 36,772 | 7–11 |
| 19 | April 21 | @ Reds | 9–3 | Penny (3–2) | Belisle (0–1) | Park (1) | 14,446 | 8–11 |
| 20 | April 22 | @ Reds | 8–1 | Vólquez (3–0) | Kuo (0–1) | | 14,763 | 8–12 |
| 21 | April 23 | Diamondbacks | 8–3 | Lowe (2–1) | Haren (3–1) | Saito (2) | 42,590 | 9–12 |
| 22 | April 24 | Diamondbacks | 6–4 | González (1–1) | Billingsley (0–4) | Lyon (6) | 38,350 | 9–13 |
| 23 | April 25 | Rockies | 8–7 (13) | Park (1–0) | Buchholz (1–2) | | 53,205 | 10–13 |
| 24 | April 26 | Rockies | 11–3 | Penny (4–2) | Redman (2–2) | | 50,469 | 11–13 |
| 25 | April 27 | Rockies | 3–2 (10) | Beimel (1–0) | Corpas (0–2) | | 50,670 | 12–13 |
| 26 | April 29 | @ Marlins | 7–6 | Beimel (2–0) | Gregg (3–1) | Saito (3) | 11,334 | 13–13 |
| 27 | April 30 | @ Marlins | 13–1 | Billingsley (1–4) | Olsen (3–1) | | 10,792 | 14–13 |

May (13–15)

| # | Date | Opponent | Score | Win | Loss | Save | Attendance | Record |
|---|---|---|---|---|---|---|---|---|
| 28 | May 1 | @ Marlins | 5–3 | Beimel (3–0) | Gregg (3–2) | Saito (4) | 15,556 | 15–13 |
| 29 | May 2 | @ Rockies | 11–6 | Penny (5–2) | Francis (0–3) | | 30,291 | 16–13 |
| 30 | May 3 | @ Rockies | 12–7 | Kuo (1–1) | de la Rosa (0–1) | | 38,597 | 17–13 |
| 31 | May 4 | @ Rockies | 7–2 | Cook (5–1) | Lowe (2–2) | Buchholz (1) | 43,726 | 17–14 |
| 32 | May 5 | Mets | 5–1 | Billingsley (2–4) | Pérez (2–3) | | 44,181 | 18–14 |
| 33 | May 6 | Mets | 5–4 | Kuo (2–1) | Figueroa (2–2) | Saito (5) | 43,927 | 19–14 |
| 34 | May 7 | Mets | 12–1 | Maine (4–2) | Penny (5–3) | | 40,696 | 19–15 |
| 35 | May 9 | Astros | 7–1 | Moehler (1–0) | Lowe (2–3) | | 52,658 | 19–16 |
| 36 | May 10 | Astros | 5–0 | Sampson (2–3) | Billingsley (2–5) | | 45,212 | 19–17 |
| 37 | May 11 | Astros | 8–5 | Geary (1–1) | Broxton (1–1) | Valverde (8) | 40,217 | 19–18 |
| 38 | May 13 | @ Brewers | 5–3 | Villanueva (2–4) | Penny (5–4) | Gagné (10) | 26,465 | 19–19 |
| 39 | May 14 | @ Brewers | 6–4 | Broxton (2–1) | Mota (1–2) | Saito (6) | 27,562 | 20–19 |
| 40 | May 15 | @ Brewers | 7–2 | Billingsley (3–5) | Sheets (4–1) | | 30,444 | 21–19 |
| 41 | May 16 | @ Angels | 4–2 | Saunders (7–1) | Kuroda (1–3) | Rodríguez (17) | 44,047 | 21–20 |
| 42 | May 17 | @ Angels | 6–3 | Kuo (3–1) | Santana (6–1) | | 43,906 | 22–20 |
| 43 | May 18 | @ Angels | 10–2 | Weaver (3–5) | Lowe (2–4) | | 44,007 | 22–21 |
| 44 | May 19 | Reds | 6–5 | Saito (2–1) | Weathers (1–3) | | 34,669 | 23–21 |
| 45 | May 20 | Reds | 4–1 | Billingsley (4–5) | Belisle (1–4) | Saito (7) | 34,306 | 24–21 |
| 46 | May 21 | Reds | 5–2 | Kuroda (2–3) | Cueto (2–5) | Saito (8) | 33,224 | 25–21 |
| 47 | May 23 | Cardinals | 2–1 | Wainwright (4–2) | Lowe (2–5) | Franklin (3) | 52,281 | 25–22 |
| 48 | May 24 | Cardinals | 4–0 | Lohse (4–2) | Penny (5–5) | | 44,785 | 25–23 |
| 49 | May 25 | Cardinals | 4–3 (10) | Saito (3–1) | Parisi (0–1) | | 46,566 | 26–23 |
| 50 | May 26 | @ Cubs | 3–1 | Dempster (6–2) | Billingsley (4–6) | Wood (11) | 41,583 | 26–24 |
| 51 | May 27 | @ Cubs | 3–1 | Gallagher (2–1) | Kuroda (2–4) | Wood (12) | 39,894 | 26–25 |
| 52 | May 28 | @ Cubs | 2–1 (10) | Howry (1–2) | Park (1–1) | | 39,945 | 26–26 |
| 53 | May 29 | @ Mets | 8–4 | Vargas (2–2) | Penny (5–6) | | 52,886 | 26–27 |
| 54 | May 30 | @ Mets | 9–5 | Park (2–1) | Heilman (0–2) | | 52,176 | 27–27 |
| 55 | May 31 | @ Mets | 3–2 | Sánchez (2–0) | Broxton (2–2) | Wagner (11) | 53,528 | 27–28 |

June (11–16)

| # | Date | Opponent | Score | Win | Loss | Save | Attendance | Record |
|---|---|---|---|---|---|---|---|---|
| 56 | June 1 | @ Mets | 6–1 | Santana (7–3) | Kuroda (2–5) | | 50,263 | 27–29 |
| 57 | June 2 | Rockies | 8–2 | Lowe (3–5) | Reynolds (0–3) | | 39,098 | 28–29 |
| 58 | June 3 | Rockies | 3–0 | Francis (2–5) | Penny (5–7) | Fuentes (7) | 38,548 | 28–30 |
| 59 | June 4 | Rockies | 2–1 | Cook (8–3) | Kershaw (0–1) | Fuentes (8) | 36,393 | 28–31 |
| 60 | June 5 | Cubs | 5–4 | Howry (2-2) | Saito (3–2) | Wood (17) | 44,988 | 28–32 |
| 61 | June 6 | Cubs | 3–0 | Kuroda (3–5) | Gallagher (3–2) | | 52,484 | 29–32 |
| 62 | June 7 | Cubs | 7–3 | Lowe (4–5) | Zambrano (8–2) | | 50,020 | 30–32 |
| 63 | June 8 | Cubs | 3–1 | Marquis (4–3) | Penny (5–8) | Wood (18) | 49,994 | 30–33 |
| 64 | June 10 | @ Padres | 7–2 | Proctor (1–0) | Hampson (0–1) | | 26,860 | 31–33 |
| 65 | June 11 | @ Padres | 4–1 | Wolf (5–4) | Billingsley (4–7) | Hoffman (15) | 29,218 | 31–34 |
| 66 | June 12 | @ Padres | 9–0 | Peavy (5–3) | Kuroda (3–6) | | 36,354 | 31–35 |
| 67 | June 13 | @ Tigers | 5–0 | Galarrage (6–2) | Lowe (4–6) | Dolsi (2) | 40,430 | 31–36 |
| 68 | June 14 | @ Tigers | 12–7 | Bonine (1–0) | Penny (5–9) | | 42,348 | 31–37 |
| 69 | June 15 | @ Tigers | 5–4 | Robertson (5–6) | Park (2–2) | Jones (12) | 41,189 | 31–38 |
| 70 | June 17 | @ Reds | 3–1 | Billingsley (5–7) | Cueto (5–7) | Saito (9) | 26,906 | 32–38 |
| 71 | June 18 | @ Reds | 6–1 | Lowe (5–6) | Arroyo (4–6) | | 20,055 | 33–38 |
| 72 | June 19 | @ Reds | 7–4 | Stults (1–0) | Harang (3–10) | Saito (10) | 30,136 | 34–38 |
| 73 | June 20 | Indians | 6–4 (10) | Borowski (1–2) | Saito (3–3) | Kobayashi (4) | 50,667 | 34–39 |
| 74 | June 21 | Indians | 7–2 (11) | Kobayashi (4–3) | Wade (0–1) | | 45,036 | 34–40 |
| 75 | June 22 | Indians | 4–3 | Billingsley (6–7) | Byrd (3–8) | Saito (11) | 39,993 | 35–40 |
| 76 | June 24 | White Sox | 6–1 | Buehrle (5–6) | Lowe (5–7) | | 43,900 | 35–41 |
| 77 | June 25 | White Sox | 5–0 | Stults (2–0) | Floyd (8–4) | | 40,162 | 36–41 |
| 78 | June 26 | White Sox | 2–0 | Danks (5–4) | Kershaw (0–2) | Jenks (17) | 37,956 | 36–42 |
| 79 | June 27 | Angels | 6–0 | Park (3–2) | Saunders (11–4) | | 50,419 | 37–42 |
| 80 | June 28 | Angels | 1–0 | Billingsley (7–7) | Weaver (7–8) | Saito (12) | 55,784 | 38–42 |
| 81 | June 29 | Angels | 1–0 | Lackey (6–1) | Lowe (5–8) | Rodríguez (32) | 48,155 | 38–43 |
| 82 | June 30 | @ Astros | 4–1 | Oswalt (7–8) | Stults (2–1) | Valverde (22) | 28,827 | 38–44 |

July (16–10)

| # | Date | Opponent | Score | Win | Loss | Save | Attendance | Record |
|---|---|---|---|---|---|---|---|---|
| 83 | July 1 | @ Astros | 7–6 (11) | Park (4–2) | Wright (3–3) | Saito (13) | 31,914 | 39–44 |
| 84 | July 2 | @ Astros | 4–1 | Kuroda (4–6) | Hernández (0–2) | | 34,058 | 40–44 |
| 85 | July 3 | @ Astros | 5–2 | Billingsley (8–7) | Backe (5–9) | Saito (14) | 35,696 | 41–44 |
| 86 | July 4 | @ Giants | 10–7 | Lowe (6–8) | Matos (0–1) | Saito (15) | 40,447 | 42–44 |
| 87 | July 5 | @ Giants | 5–2 | Zito (4–12) | Falkenborg (0–1) | Wilson (24) | 40,741 | 42–45 |
| 88 | July 6 | @ Giants | 5–3 | Falkenborg (1–1) | Cain (5–7) | Saito (16) | 39,290 | 43–45 |
| 89 | July 7 | Braves | 3–0 | Kuroda (5–6) | Campillo (3–4) | | 39,896 | 44–45 |
| 90 | July 8 | Braves | 9–3 | Jurrjens (9–4) | Billingsley (8–8) | | 39,702 | 44–46 |
| 91 | July 9 | Braves | 2–1 | Lowe (7–8) | Hudson (9–7) | Saito (17) | 39,815 | 45–46 |
| 92 | July 10 | Marlins | 5–4 (11) | Nelson (2–0) | Falkenborg (1–2) | Gregg (18) | 40,417 | 45–47 |
| 93 | July 11 | Marlins | 3–1 | Volstad (2–0) | Stults (2–2) | Gregg (19) | 49,545 | 45–48 |
| 94 | July 12 | Marlins | 5–3 (11) | Waechter (1–2) | Troncoso (0–1) | Gregg (20) | 55,220 | 45–49 |
| 95 | July 13 | Marlins | 9–1 | Billingsley (9–8) | Miller (5–9) | | 42,213 | 46–49 |
| 96 | July 18 | @ Diamondbacks | 8–7 (11) | Wade (1–1) | Slaten (0–3) | Broxton (1) | 38,561 | 47–49 |
| 97 | July 19 | @ Diamondbacks | 3–2 | Haren (9–5) | Billingsley (9–9) | Lyon (20) | 41,458 | 47–50 |
| 98 | July 20 | @ Diamondbacks | 6–5 | Troncoso (1–1) | Lyon (2–4) | Broxton (2) | 39,217 | 48–50 |
| 99 | July 21 | @ Rockies | 16–10 | Falkenborg (2–2) | Wells (1–2) | | 38,291 | 49–50 |
| 100 | July 22 | @ Rockies | 10–1 | Jiménez (6–9) | Kershaw (0–3) | | 41,567 | 49–51 |
| 101 | July 23 | @ Rockies | 5–3 | Rusch (4–3) | Kuroda (5–7) | Fuentes (17) | 36,305 | 49–52 |
| 102 | July 25 | Nationals | 3–2 | Billingsley (10–9) | Lannan (6–10) | Broxton (3) | 47,313 | 50–52 |
| 103 | July 26 | Nationals | 6–0 | Lowe (8–8) | Pérez (3–8) | | 42,122 | 51–52 |
| 104 | July 27 | Nationals | 2–0 | Kershaw (1–3) | Bergmann (1–8) | Broxton (4) | 38,660 | 52–52 |
| 105 | July 28 | Giants | 7–6 | Correia (2–5) | Kuroda (5–8) | Wilson (28) | 37,483 | 52–53 |
| 106 | July 29 | Giants | 2–0 | Johnson (1–0) | Cain (6–9) | Broxton (5) | 40,110 | 53–53 |
| 107 | July 30 | Giants | 4–0 | Billingsley (11–9) | Sánchez (8–7) | | 41,282 | 54–53 |
| 108 | July 31 | Diamondbacks | 2–1 | Webb (15–4) | Lowe (8–9) | Lyon (23) | 42,440 | 54–54 |

August (13–16)

| # | Date | Opponent | Score | Win | Loss | Save | Attendance | Record |
|---|---|---|---|---|---|---|---|---|
| 109 | August 1 | Diamondbacks | 2–1 | Johnson (9–7) | Park (4–3) | Lyon (24) | 55,239 | 54–55 |
| 110 | August 2 | Diamondbacks | 4–2 | Kuroda (6–8) | Petit (1–2) | Park (2) | 54,544 | 55–55 |
| 111 | August 3 | Diamondbacks | 9–3 | Wade (2–1) | Davis (4–6) | | 52,972 | 56–55 |
| 112 | August 5 | @ Cardinals | 6–4 (11) | García (1–1) | Johnson (1–1) | | 40,773 | 56–56 |
| 113 | August 6 | @ Cardinals | 9–6 | Piñeiro (4–5) | Lowe (8–10) | Perez (1) | 42,581 | 56–57 |
| 114 | August 7 | @ Cardinals | 4–1 | Kershaw (2–3) | Lohse (13–4) | Broxton (6) | 40,500 | 57–57 |
| 115 | August 8 | @ Giants | 6–2 | Penny (6–9) | Zito (6–14) | Broxton (7) | 40,142 | 58–57 |
| 116 | August 9 | @ Giants | 3–2 (10) | Walker (4–6) | Broxton (2–3) | | 41,963 | 58–58 |
| 117 | August 10 | @ Giants | 5–4 | Taschner (3–1) | Kuo (3–2) | | 41,804 | 58–59 |
| 118 | August 11 | Phillies | 8–6 | Lowe (9–10) | Kendrick (10–6) | Broxton (8) | 45,547 | 59–59 |
| 119 | August 12 | Phillies | 4–3 | Kuo (4–2) | Romero (4–4) | | 47,586 | 60–59 |
| 120 | August 13 | Phillies | 7–6 | Broxton (3–3) | Condrey (3–3) | | 45,786 | 61–59 |
| 121 | August 14 | Phillies | 3–1 | Kuroda (7–8) | Myers (5–10) | Kuo (1) | 51,060 | 62–59 |
| 122 | August 15 | Brewers | 5–3 | Billingsley (12–9) | Parra (9–6) | Broxton (9) | 44,547 | 63–59 |
| 123 | August 16 | Brewers | 4–3 (10) | Torres (6–3) | Broxton (3–4) | Riske (2) | 52,889 | 63–60 |
| 124 | August 17 | Brewers | 7–5 | Beimel (4–0) | Villanueva (4–6) | | 45,267 | 64–60 |
| 125 | August 19 | Rockies | 8–3 | Jiménez (9–11) | Kuroda (7–9) | | 46,687 | 64–61 |
| 126 | August 20 | Rockies | 4–3 | Buchholz (6–3) | Broxton (3–5) | Fuentes (24) | 48,183 | 64–62 |
| 127 | August 21 | Rockies | 3–1 | Lowe (10–10) | de la Rosa (6–7) | Broxton (10) | 44,885 | 65–62 |
| 128 | August 22 | @ Phillies | 8–1 | Kendrick (11–7) | Maddux (6–10) | | 42,620 | 65–63 |
| 129 | August 23 | @ Phillies | 9–2 | Hamels (11–8) | Kershaw (2–4) | | 45,019 | 65–64 |
| 130 | August 24 | @ Phillies | 5–2 (11) | Durbin (5–2) | Beimel (4–1) | | 43,039 | 65–65 |
| 131 | August 25 | @ Phillies | 5–0 | Myers (7–10) | Billingsley (12–10) | | 40,873 | 65–66 |
| 132 | August 26 | @ Nationals | 2–1 | Balester (3–6) | Lowe (10–11) | Hanrahan (5) | 26,110 | 65–67 |
| 133 | August 27 | @ Nationals | 5–4 | Redding (9–8) | Maddux (6–11) | Hanrahan (6) | 22,907 | 65–68 |
| 134 | August 28 | @ Nationals | 11–2 | Lannan (8–12) | Kershaw (2–5) | | 26,338 | 65–69 |
| 135 | August 29 | @ Diamondbacks | 9–3 | Davis (6–8) | Kuroda (7–10) | | 32,610 | 65–70 |
| 136 | August 30 | @ Diamondbacks | 6–2 | Billingsley (13–10) | Haren (14–7) | | 49,045 | 66–70 |
| 137 | August 31 | @ Diamondbacks | 8–1 | Lowe (11–11) | Webb (19–6) | | 43,456 | 67–70 |

September (17–8)

| # | Date | Opponent | Score | Win | Loss | Save | Attendance | Record |
|---|---|---|---|---|---|---|---|---|
| 138 | September 1 | Padres | 5–2 | Maddux (7–11) | Young (4–5) | Broxton (11) | 44,087 | 68–70 |
| 139 | September 2 | Padres | 8–4 | Kershaw (3–5) | Baek (4–10) | | 39,330 | 69–70 |
| 140 | September 3 | Padres | 6–4 | Kuroda (8–10) | LeBlanc (0–1) | Broxton (12) | 48,822 | 70–70 |
| 141 | September 5 | Diamondbacks | 7–0 | Lowe (12–11) | Haren (14–8) | | 52,270 | 71–70 |
| 142 | September 6 | Diamondbacks | 7–2 | Billingsley (14–10) | Webb (19–7) | | 47,543 | 72–70 |
| 143 | September 7 | Diamondbacks | 5–3 | Kuo (5–2) | Rauch (4–6) | Broxton (13) | 54,137 | 73–70 |
| 144 | September 8 | @ Padres | 4–0 | Baek (5-10) | Maddux (7–12) | | 25,942 | 73–71 |
| 145 | September 9 | @ Padres | 6–2 | Beimel (5–1) | Bell (6–6) | | 26,614 | 74–71 |
| 146 | September 10 | @ Padres | 7–2 | Lowe (13–11) | Estes (2–2) | | 27,208 | 75–71 |
| 147 | September 12 | @ Rockies | 7–2 | Billingsley (15–10) | Francis (4–10) | | 30,147 | 76–71 |
| 148 | September 13 | @ Rockies | 5–1 | Kershaw (4–5) | de la Rosa (8–8) | | 40,291 | 77–71 |
| 149 | September 14 | @ Rockies | 1–0 (10) | Corpas (3–3) | Kuo (5–3) | | 28,910 | 77–72 |
| 150 | September 15 | @ Pirates | 8–2 | Kuroda (9–10) | Ohlendorf (1–3) | | 13,147 | 78–72 |
| 151 | September 16 | @ Pirates | 6–2 | Lowe (14–11) | Karstens (2–6) | | 12,741 | 79–72 |
| 152 | September 17 | @ Pirates | 15–8 | Grabow (6–3) | Elbert (0–1) | | 11,883 | 79–73 |
| 153 | September 18 | @ Pirates | 4–3 (12) | Proctor (2–0) | Hansen (2–7) | Broxton (14) | 12,709 | 80–73 |
| 154 | September 19 | Giants | 7–1 | Zito (10–16) | Maddux (7–13) | | 55,589 | 80–74 |
| 155 | September 20 | Giants | 10–7 | Saito (4–3) | Walker (4–8) | | 55,724 | 81–74 |
| 156 | September 21 | Giants | 1–0 (11) | Romo (3–1) | Saito (4–4) | Wilson (40) | 55,294 | 81–75 |
| 157 | September 23 | Padres | 10–1 | Billingsley (16–10) | LeBlanc (1–2) | | 48,905 | 82–75 |
| 158 | September 24 | Padres | 12–4 | Kershaw (5–5) | Ekstrom (0–1) | | 44,776 | 83–75 |
| 159 | September 25 | Padres | 7–5 | Peavy (10–11) | Stults (2–3) | Hoffman (29) | 52,569 | 83–76 |
| 160 | September 26 | @ Giants | 6–5 (10) | Walker (5–8) | Johnson (1–2) | | 33,920 | 83–77 |
| 161 | September 27 | @ Giants | 2–1 | Maddux (8–13) | Cain (8–14) | Saito (18) | 38,673 | 84–77 |
| 162 | September 28 | @ Giants | 3–1 | Lincecum (18–5) | Park (4–4) | Wilson (41) | 39,167 | 84–78 |

=== Playoffs ===
2008 Post-Season
National League Division Series (3–0)

| Game | Date | Opponent | Score | Win | Loss | Save | Attendance | Series |
|---|---|---|---|---|---|---|---|---|
| 1 | October 1 | @ Cubs | 7–2 | Lowe (1–0) | Dempster (0–1) | | 42,099 | 1–0 |
| 2 | October 2 | @ Cubs | 10–3 | Billingsley (1–0) | Zambrano (0–1) | | 42,136 | 2–0 |
| 3 | October 4 | Cubs | 3–1 | Kuroda (1–0) | Harden (0–1) | Broxton (1) | 56,000 | 3–0 |

National League Championship Series (1–4)

| Game | Date | Opponent | Score | Win | Loss | Save | Attendance | Series |
|---|---|---|---|---|---|---|---|---|
| 1 | October 9 | @ Phillies | 3–2 | Hamels (1–0) | Lowe (0–1) | Lidge (1) | 45,839 | 0–1 |
| 2 | October 10 | @ Phillies | 8–5 | Myers (1–0) | Billingsley (0–1) | Lidge (2) | 45,883 | 0–2 |
| 3 | October 12 | Phillies | 7–2 | Kuroda (1–0) | Moyer (0–1) | | 56,800 | 1–2 |
| 4 | October 13 | Phillies | 7–5 | Madson (1–0) | Wade (0–1) | Lidge (3) | 56,800 | 1–3 |
| 5 | October 15 | Phillies | 5–1 | Hamels (2–0) | Billingsley (0–2) | | 56,800 | 1–4 |

== Player stats ==
Note: Team batting and pitching leaders in each category are in bold.

=== Batting ===
Note: G = Games played; AB = At bats; R = Runs; H = Hits; 2B = Doubles; 3B = Triples; HR = Home runs; RBI = Runs batted in; TB = Total bases; BB = Walks; SO = Strikeouts; SB = Stolen bases; OBP = On-base percentage; SLG = Slugging; Avg. = Batting average

| Player | G | AB | R | H | 2B | 3B | HR | RBI | TB | BB | SO | SB | OBP | SLG | AVG |
|---|---|---|---|---|---|---|---|---|---|---|---|---|---|---|---|
| Matt Kemp | 155 | **606** | **93** | **176** | **38** | 5 | 18 | 76 | **278** | 46 | **153** | 35 | .340 | .459 | .290 |
| James Loney | **161** | 595 | 66 | 172 | 35 | **6** | 13 | **90** | 258 | 45 | 85 | 7 | .338 | .434 | .289 |
| Russell Martin | 155 | 553 | 87 | 155 | 25 | 0 | 13 | 69 | 219 | **90** | 83 | 18 | **.385** | .396 | .280 |
| Andre Ethier | 141 | 525 | 90 | 160 | **38** | 5 | **20** | 77 | 268 | 59 | 88 | 6 | .375 | **.510** | **.305** |
| Jeff Kent | 121 | 440 | 42 | 123 | 23 | 1 | 12 | 59 | 184 | 25 | 52 | 0 | .327 | .418 | .280 |
| Juan Pierre | 119 | 375 | 44 | 106 | 10 | 2 | 1 | 28 | 123 | 22 | 24 | **40** | .327 | .328 | .283 |
| Blake DeWitt | 117 | 368 | 45 | 97 | 13 | 2 | 9 | 52 | 141 | 45 | 68 | 3 | .344 | .383 | .264 |
| Ángel Berroa | 84 | 226 | 26 | 52 | 13 | 1 | 1 | 16 | 70 | 20 | 41 | 0 | .304 | .310 | .230 |
| Casey Blake | 58 | 211 | 25 | 53 | 12 | 1 | 10 | 23 | 97 | 16 | 52 | 1 | .313 | .460 | .251 |
| Andruw Jones | 75 | 209 | 21 | 33 | 8 | 1 | 3 | 14 | 52 | 27 | 76 | 0 | .256 | .249 | .158 |
| Manny Ramirez | 53 | 187 | 36 | 74 | 14 | 0 | 17 | 53 | 139 | 35 | 38 | 2 | .489 | .743 | .396 |
| Nomar Garciaparra | 55 | 163 | 24 | 43 | 9 | 0 | 8 | 28 | 76 | 15 | 11 | 1 | .326 | .466 | .264 |
| Rafael Furcal | 36 | 143 | 34 | 51 | 12 | 2 | 5 | 16 | 82 | 20 | 17 | 8 | .439 | .573 | .357 |
| Delwyn Young | 83 | 126 | 10 | 31 | 9 | 0 | 1 | 7 | 43 | 14 | 34 | 0 | .321 | .341 | .246 |
| Chin-Lung Hu | 65 | 116 | 16 | 21 | 2 | 2 | 0 | 9 | 27 | 11 | 23 | 2 | .252 | .233 | .181 |
| Mark Sweeney | 98 | 92 | 2 | 12 | 3 | 0 | 0 | 5 | 15 | 15 | 28 | 0 | .250 | .163 | .130 |
| Luis Maza | 45 | 79 | 7 | 18 | 1 | 0 | 1 | 4 | 22 | 5 | 11 | 0 | .282 | .278 | .228 |
| Andy LaRoche | 27 | 59 | 6 | 12 | 1 | 0 | 2 | 6 | 19 | 10 | 7 | 0 | .319 | .322 | .203 |
| Danny Ardoin | 24 | 51 | 3 | 12 | 1 | 0 | 1 | 4 | 16 | 2 | 10 | 1 | .278 | .314 | .235 |
| Pablo Ozuna | 36 | 32 | 6 | 7 | 0 | 1 | 1 | 3 | 12 | 1 | 5 | 1 | .242 | .375 | .219 |
| Gary Bennett | 10 | 21 | 1 | 4 | 1 | 0 | 1 | 4 | 8 | 2 | 0 | 0 | .261 | .381 | .190 |
| Jason Repko | 22 | 18 | 0 | 3 | 1 | 0 | 0 | 0 | 4 | 2 | 9 | 1 | .250 | .222 | .167 |
| Terry Tiffee | 6 | 4 | 0 | 1 | 0 | 0 | 0 | 0 | 1 | 0 | 0 | 0 | .400 | .250 | .250 |
| A. J. Ellis | 4 | 3 | 1 | 0 | 0 | 0 | 0 | 0 | 0 | 0 | 2 | 0 | .000 | .000 | .000 |
| Pitcher totals | 162 | 304 | 15 | 39 | 2 | 0 | 0 | 16 | 41 | 16 | 115 | 0 | .171 | .135 | .128 |
| **Team totals** | **162** | **5506** | **700** | **1455** | **271** | **29** | **137** | **659** | **2195** | **543** | **1032** | **126** | **.333** | **.399** | **.264** |

=== Pitching ===
Note: G = Games played; GS = Games started; IP = Innings pitched; W = Wins; L = Losses; SV = Saves; ERA = Earned run average; BB = Walks; SO = Strikeouts; H = Hits; R = Runs; ER = Earned runs

| Player | G | GS | IP | W | L | SV | ERA | BB | SO | H | R | ER |
|---|---|---|---|---|---|---|---|---|---|---|---|---|
| Derek Lowe | 34 | **34** | **211.0** | 14 | **11** | 0 | 3.24 | 45 | 147 | **194** | 84 | **76** |
| Chad Billingsley | 35 | 32 | 200.2 | **16** | 10 | 0 | **3.14** | **80** | **201** | 188 | 76 | 70 |
| Hiroki Kuroda | 31 | 31 | 183.1 | 9 | 10 | 0 | 3.73 | 42 | 116 | 181 | **85** | **76** |
| Clayton Kershaw | 22 | 21 | 107.2 | 5 | 5 | 0 | 4.26 | 52 | 100 | 109 | 51 | 51 |
| Chan Ho Park | 54 | 5 | 95.1 | 4 | 4 | 2 | 3.40 | 36 | 79 | 97 | 43 | 36 |
| Brad Penny | 19 | 17 | 94.2 | 6 | 9 | 0 | 6.27 | 42 | 51 | 112 | 68 | 66 |
| Hong-Chih Kuo | 42 | 3 | 80.0 | 5 | 3 | 1 | 2.14 | 21 | 96 | 60 | 21 | 19 |
| Cory Wade | 55 | 0 | 71.1 | 2 | 1 | 0 | 2.27 | 15 | 51 | 51 | 22 | 18 |
| Jonathan Broxton | 70 | 0 | 69.0 | 3 | 5 | 14 | 3.13 | 27 | 88 | 54 | 29 | 24 |
| Joe Beimel | **71** | 0 | 49.0 | 5 | 1 | 0 | 2.02 | 21 | 32 | 50 | 11 | 11 |
| Takashi Saito | 45 | 0 | 47.0 | 4 | 4 | **18** | 2.49 | 16 | 60 | 40 | 14 | 13 |
| Greg Maddux | 7 | 7 | 40.2 | 2 | 4 | 0 | 5.09 | 4 | 18 | 43 | 25 | 23 |
| Scott Proctor | 41 | 0 | 38.2 | 2 | 0 | 0 | 6.05 | 24 | 46 | 41 | 30 | 26 |
| Eric Stults | 7 | 7 | 38.2 | 2 | 3 | 0 | 3.49 | 13 | 30 | 38 | 18 | 15 |
| Ramón Troncoso | 32 | 0 | 38.0 | 1 | 1 | 0 | 4.26 | 12 | 38 | 37 | 19 | 18 |
| Jason Johnson | 16 | 2 | 29.1 | 1 | 2 | 0 | 4.26 | 12 | 20 | 32 | 19 | 17 |
| Esteban Loaiza | 7 | 3 | 24.0 | 1 | 2 | 0 | 5.63 | 5 | 9 | 24 | 15 | 15 |
| Scott Elbert | 10 | 0 | 24.0 | 0 | 1 | 0 | 12.00 | 4 | 8 | 9 | 8 | 8 |
| Brian Falkenborg | 16 | 0 | 11.2 | 2 | 2 | 0 | 6.17 | 4 | 9 | 11 | 8 | 8 |
| James McDonald | 4 | 0 | 6.0 | 0 | 0 | 0 | 0.00 | 1 | 2 | 5 | 0 | 0 |
| Yhency Brazobán | 2 | 0 | 3.0 | 0 | 0 | 0 | 6.00 | 3 | 3 | 4 | 2 | 2 |
| Tanyon Sturtze | 3 | 0 | 2.1 | 0 | 0 | 0 | 0.00 | 1 | 1 | 1 | 0 | 0 |
| **Team totals** | **162** | **162** | **1447.1** | **84** | **78** | **35** | **3.68** | **480** | **1205** | **1381** | **648** | **591** |

== 2008 National League Division Series ==
The Dodgers advanced to the 2008 NLDS to play the Central Division champion Chicago Cubs. They wound up sweeping the Cubs in three games, taking the first two at Wrigley Field and then ending the series in Game 3 at home. This was the Dodgers first post season series victory since the 1988 World Series and first post season sweep since the 1963 World Series.

=== Game 1, October 1 ===
Wrigley Field in Chicago

| Team | 1 | 2 | 3 | 4 | 5 | 6 | 7 | 8 | 9 | R | H | E |
|---|---|---|---|---|---|---|---|---|---|---|---|---|
| Los Angeles | 0 | 0 | 0 | 0 | 4 | 0 | 1 | 1 | 1 | 7 | 8 | 1 |
| Chicago | 0 | 2 | 0 | 0 | 0 | 0 | 0 | 0 | 0 | 2 | 9 | 1 |
WP: Derek Lowe (1-0) LP: Ryan Dempster (0-1); Home runs: LAD: James Loney (1), Manny Ramírez (1), Russell Martin (1); CHC: Mark DeRosa (1)

=== Game 2, October 2 ===
Wrigley Field in Chicago

| Team | 1 | 2 | 3 | 4 | 5 | 6 | 7 | 8 | 9 | R | H | E |
|---|---|---|---|---|---|---|---|---|---|---|---|---|
| Los Angeles | 0 | 5 | 0 | 0 | 1 | 0 | 1 | 2 | 1 | 10 | 12 | 0 |
| Chicago | 0 | 0 | 0 | 0 | 0 | 0 | 1 | 0 | 2 | 3 | 8 | 4 |
WP: Chad Billingsley (1-0) LP: Carlos Zambrano (0-1); Home runs: LAD: Manny Ramírez (2); CHC: None

=== Game 3, October 4 ===
Dodger Stadium in Los Angeles

| Team | 1 | 2 | 3 | 4 | 5 | 6 | 7 | 8 | 9 | R | H | E |
|---|---|---|---|---|---|---|---|---|---|---|---|---|
| Chicago | 0 | 0 | 0 | 0 | 0 | 0 | 0 | 1 | 0 | 1 | 8 | 1 |
| Los Angeles | 2 | 0 | 0 | 0 | 1 | 0 | 0 | 0 | X | 3 | 6 | 0 |
WP: Hiroki Kuroda (1-0) LP: Rich Harden (0-1) Sv: Jonathan Broxton (1)

== 2008 National League Championship Series ==
The Dodgers advanced to the NLCS for the first time since 1988 to play the Philadelphia Phillies, in the fourth National League Championship Series meeting between the two teams.

=== Game 1, October 9 ===
Citizens Bank Park in Philadelphia

| Team | 1 | 2 | 3 | 4 | 5 | 6 | 7 | 8 | 9 | R | H | E |
|---|---|---|---|---|---|---|---|---|---|---|---|---|
| Los Angeles | 1 | 0 | 0 | 1 | 0 | 0 | 0 | 0 | 0 | 2 | 7 | 1 |
| Philadelphia | 0 | 0 | 0 | 0 | 0 | 3 | 0 | 0 | X | 3 | 7 | 0 |
WP: Cole Hamels (1-0) LP: Derek Lowe (0-1) Sv: Brad Lidge (1); Home runs: LAD: None; PHI: Chase Utley (1), Pat Burrell (1)

=== Game 2, October 10 ===
Citizens Bank Park in Philadelphia

| Team | 1 | 2 | 3 | 4 | 5 | 6 | 7 | 8 | 9 | R | H | E |
|---|---|---|---|---|---|---|---|---|---|---|---|---|
| Los Angeles | 0 | 1 | 1 | 3 | 0 | 0 | 0 | 0 | 0 | 5 | 8 | 1 |
| Philadelphia | 0 | 4 | 4 | 0 | 0 | 0 | 0 | 0 | X | 8 | 11 | 1 |
WP: Brett Myers (1-0) LP: Chad Billingsley (0-1) Sv: Brad Lidge (2); Home runs: LAD: Manny Ramírez (1); PHI: None

=== Game 3, October 12 ===
Dodger Stadium in Los Angeles

| Team | 1 | 2 | 3 | 4 | 5 | 6 | 7 | 8 | 9 | R | H | E |
|---|---|---|---|---|---|---|---|---|---|---|---|---|
| Philadelphia | 0 | 1 | 0 | 0 | 0 | 0 | 1 | 0 | 0 | 2 | 7 | 0 |
| Los Angeles | 5 | 1 | 0 | 1 | 0 | 0 | 0 | 0 | X | 7 | 10 | 0 |
WP: Hiroki Kuroda (1-0) LP: Jamie Moyer (0-1); Home runs: PHI: None; LAD: Rafael Furcal (1)

=== Game 4, October 13 ===
Dodger Stadium in Los Angeles

| Team | 1 | 2 | 3 | 4 | 5 | 6 | 7 | 8 | 9 | R | H | E |
|---|---|---|---|---|---|---|---|---|---|---|---|---|
| Philadelphia | 2 | 0 | 0 | 0 | 0 | 1 | 0 | 4 | 0 | 7 | 12 | 1 |
| Los Angeles | 1 | 0 | 0 | 0 | 2 | 2 | 0 | 0 | 0 | 5 | 11 | 0 |
WP: Ryan Madson (1-0) LP: Cory Wade (0-1) Sv: Brad Lidge (3); Home runs: PHI: Shane Victorino (1), Matt Stairs (1); LAD: Casey Blake (1)

=== Game 5, October 15 ===
Dodger Stadium in Los Angeles

| Team | 1 | 2 | 3 | 4 | 5 | 6 | 7 | 8 | 9 | R | H | E |
|---|---|---|---|---|---|---|---|---|---|---|---|---|
| Philadelphia | 1 | 0 | 2 | 0 | 2 | 0 | 0 | 0 | 0 | 5 | 8 | 0 |
| Los Angeles | 0 | 0 | 0 | 0 | 0 | 1 | 0 | 0 | 0 | 1 | 7 | 3 |
WP: Cole Hamels (2-0) LP: Chad Billingsley (0-2); Home runs: PHI: Jimmy Rollins (1); LAD: Manny Ramírez (2)

== 2008 Awards ==
- 2008 Major League Baseball All-Star Game
  - Russell Martin reserve
- Gold Glove Award
  - Greg Maddux
- Player of the Month
  - Manny Ramirez August
- Player of the Week
  - Matt Kemp April 28 – May 4
  - Andre Ethier September 1–7

== 2008 Minor League Teams ==
| Level | Team | League | Manager | W | L | Position |
|---|---|---|---|---|---|---|
| AAA | Las Vegas 51s | Pacific Coast League | Lorenzo Bundy | 75 | 69 | 2nd in PCL Pacific South, 8 1/2 GB |
| AA | Jacksonville Suns | Southern League | John Shoemaker | 35 | 35 | 4th in SOU South (2nd half), 8 1/2 GB |
| High A | Inland Empire 66ers | California League | John Valentin | 38 | 34 | 3rd in CAL South (2nd half), 3 GB |
| A | Great Lakes Loons | Midwest League | Juan Bustabad | 24 | 46 | Last in MID Eastern, 19 GB |
| Rookie | Ogden Raptors | Pioneer League | Mike Brumley | 22 | 12 | 2nd in PIO South, 3 GB |
| Rookie | Gulf Coast Dodgers | Gulf Coast League | Jeff Carter | 30 | 26 | 3rd in GCL East, 3 1/2 GB |
| Rookie | DSL Dodgers | Dominican Summer League | Pedro Mega | 27 | 44 | 11th in DSL B.C. South, 23 1/2 GB |

== Major League Baseball draft ==
The Dodgers selected 45 players in this draft. Of those, eleven of them would eventually play Major League baseball.

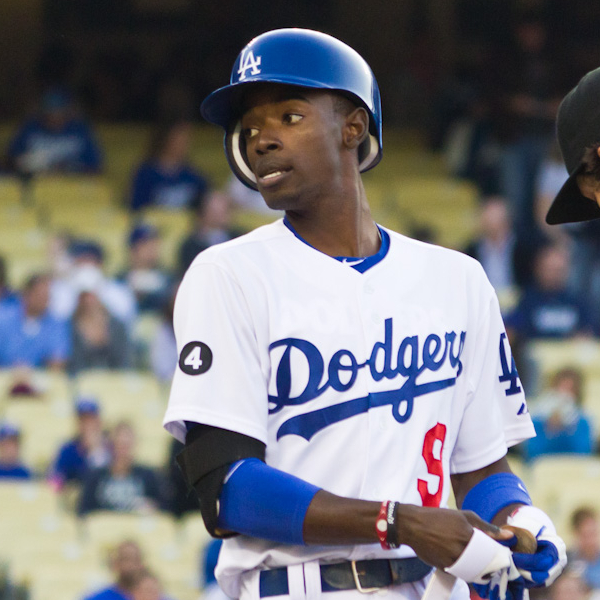
Dee Gordon was selected in the fourth round of the 2008 draft.

The first round pick was right handed pitcher Ethan Martin from Stephens County School in Toccoa, Georgia. He was traded to the Philadelphia Phillies in 2012 (along with this year's second round pick, pitcher Josh Lindblom) and made his Major league debut for the Phillies in 2013. The fourth round pick, shortstop Dee Gordon became an All-Star as the Dodgers second baseman in 2014, when he also led the league in steals.

2008 draft picks

| Round | Name | Position | School | Signed | Career span | Highest level |
|---|---|---|---|---|---|---|
| 1 | Ethan Martin | RHP | Stephens County School | Yes | 2009–2015 | MLB |
| 2 | Josh Lindblom | RHP | Purdue University | Yes | 2008–2022 | MLB |
| 3 | Kyle Russell | OF | University of Texas at Austin | Yes | 2008–2013 | AAA |
| 4 | Dee Gordon | SS | Seminole Community College | Yes | 2008–2022 | MLB |
| 5 | John Michael Redding | RHP | Florida College | Yes | 2008–2013 | AA |
| 6 | Tony Delmonico | SS | Florida State University | Yes | 2008–2015 | A+ |
| 7 | Cole St. Clair | LHP | Rice University | Yes | 2008–2012 | AAA |
| 8 | Nick Buss | OF | University of Southern California | Yes | 2008–2018 | MLB |
| 9 | Steven Caseres | 1B | James Madison University | Yes | 2008–2012 | A+ |
| 10 | Chris Joyce | LHP | Dos Pueblos High School | No; Reds-2011 | 2011–2012 | A+ |
| 11 | Nathan Eovaldi | RHP | Alvin High School | Yes | 2008–present | MLB |
| 12 | Austin Yount | 3B | Stanford University | Yes | 2008–2011 | A+ |
| 13 | Lenell McGee | OF | Oakton Community College | Yes | 2008–2010 | A |
| 14 | Clay Calfee | OF | Angelo State University | Yes | 2008–2011 | A+ |
| 15 | Albie Goulder | 1B | Louisiana Tech University | Yes | 2008 | Rookie |
| 16 | Kyle Conley | OF | University of Washington | No; Cardinals-2009 | 2009–2012 | AA |
| 17 | Daniel Coulombe | LHP | Chaparral High School | No; Dodgers-2012 | 2012–present | MLB |
| 18 | Allen Webster | RHP | McMichael High School | Yes | 2008–2019 | MLB |
| 19 | David Rollins | LHP | First Baptist Academy | No; Blue Jays-2011 | 2011–2018 | MLB |
| 20 | Zack Cox | 3B | Pleasure Ridge Park High School | No; Cardinals-2010 | 2010–2017 | AAA |
| 21 | Dave Sever | RHP | St. Louis University | No; Blue Jays-2009 | 2009–2010 | A |
| 22 | Matt Smith | RHP | Wichita State University | Yes | 2008–2014 | A+ |
| 23 | Brian Ruggiano | 2B | Texas A&M University | Yes | 2008–2011 | A |
| 24 | Fabian Feliciano | LHP | Puerto Rico Baseball Academy | Yes | 2008–2014 | A |
| 25 | Jerry Sands | OF | Catawba College | Yes | 2008–2021 | MLB |
| 26 | Cody Weiss | RHP | Parkland High School | No; Mariners-2011 | 2011–2012 | A- |
| 27 | Clayton Allison | RHP | California State University, Fresno | Yes | 2008 | AA |
| 28 | Jordan Roberts | LHP | Embry–Riddle Aeronautical University | Yes | 2008–2013 | A+ |
| 29 | Jonathan Runnels | LHP | Rice University | Yes | 2008–2010 | Rookie |
| 30 | Garett Green | 2B | San Diego State University | Yes | 2008–2009 | AAA |
| 31 | Matt Magill | RHP | Royal High School | Yes | 2008–2020 | MLB |
| 32 | Shan Sullivan | 3B | Angelo State University | Yes | 2008–2009 | Rookie |
| 33 | Melvin Ray | OF | North Florida Christian High School | Yes | 2008–2010 | Rookie |
| 34 | Andrew Darwin | OF | San Jacinto High School | No | | |
| 35 | Adam Westmoreland | LHP | Brookland-Cayce High School | No; Marlins-2013 | 2013 | Rookie |
| 36 | Jake New | OF | Tennessee Technological University | Yes | 2008 | Rookie |
| 37 | Will Clinard | RHP | East Robertson High School | No; Tigers-2012 | 2012 | AA |
| 38 | Tommy Nurre | 1B | Miami University of Ohio | No; Reds-2009 | 2009–2010 | A |
| 39 | Matt Murray | RHP | Owen J. Roberts High School | No; Royals-2011 | 2011–2016 | AAA |
| 40 | Jimmy Parque | OF | Skyline Junior College | No; Cardinals-2013 | 2012–2013 | A+ |
| 41 | Jett Bandy | C | Thousand Oaks High School | No; Angels-2011 | 2011–2021 | MLB |
| 42 | Adam Moskowitz | 2B | Valley High School | No | | |
| 43 | Greg Zebrack | OF | Campbell Hall School | No; Nationals-2013 | 2013–2014 | A |
| 44 | Matthew Reed | LHP | West Stanley High School | No | | |
| 45 | Ryan Arp | C | University of Iowa | Yes | 2008–2009 | AAA |
