= 2008 National League Championship Series =

Team (Wins)	Managers	Season
Philadelphia Phillies (4)	Charlie Manuel	92–70 (.568), GA: 3
Los Angeles Dodgers (1)	Joe Torre	84–78 (.519), GA: 2
- Dates: October 9–15
- MVP: Cole Hamels (Philadelphia)
- Umpires: Mike Reilly (crew chief), Jerry Meals, Mike Everitt, Ted Barrett, Mike Winters, Gary Cederstrom

Broadcast
- Television: Fox; RSN; NASN; Five; ESPN Latin America
- TV announcers: Joe Buck and Tim McCarver (Fox)
- Radio: ESPN
- Radio announcers: Dan Shulman, Steve Phillips (Games 1–2), and Orel Hershiser (Games 3–5)
- NLDS: Los Angeles Dodgers over Chicago Cubs (3–0); Philadelphia Phillies over Milwaukee Brewers (3–1)

The 2008 National League Championship Series (NLCS) was the best-of-seven playoff series pitted the second-seeded Philadelphia Phillies against the third-seeded Los Angeles Dodgers for the National League pennant. Philadelphia held home field advantage for this series due to their better regular-season record. The teams split their season series, with the home team sweeping their two four-game series in August.

This series marked the first postseason meeting for the Phillies and Dodgers since the 1983 NLCS, which Philadelphia won 3–1 en route to a loss to Baltimore in the World Series. It also marked the first NLCS for both teams since the Division Series was instituted in 1995. Overall, this was the fourth time these two teams had met in the postseason. Prior to the 1983 NLCS, the Dodgers had defeated the Phillies 3–1 in the NLCS during both the 1977 and 1978 post-seasons.

The series opened on Thursday, October 9, 2008, at Citizens Bank Park in Philadelphia, with the series being telecast on Fox.

The Phillies won the series, four games to one. They would go on to defeat the Tampa Bay Rays in the World Series in five games.

== Background ==
The Philadelphia Phillies (92–70, NL East Champions) featured an experienced line-up and stellar defense, to go with a capable pitching staff. Statistical leaders in batting for the 2008 team included center fielder Shane Victorino (batting average, .293), first baseman Ryan Howard (home runs, 48; runs batted in, 146), and second baseman Chase Utley (runs scored, 113). For their accomplishments, Howard won the Josh Gibson Award for the National League, and Utley won his third consecutive Silver Slugger Award. Pitching leaders included left-handed starting pitcher Cole Hamels (innings pitched, 227), left-hander starter Jamie Moyer (wins, 16), and right-handed relief pitcher Brad Lidge (saves, 41). Like the 2007 Phillies, the 2008 team took advantage of another New York Mets' September collapse.

The Los Angeles Dodgers (84–78, NL West Champions) were at .500 with 108 games played on July 31. On that day, they traded for left fielder Manny Ramirez. The trade deadline move gave Los Angeles arguably the best-right handed hitter in Major League Baseball and a dominant force in the middle of their lineup. Ramirez hit .396 with 17 home runs in 53 games after the trade while the Dodgers clinched the National League West title with four days left in the regular season for their third playoff appearance in the past five seasons. To go along with Ramirez, youth was featured throughout the Dodgers line-up, such as All-Star catcher Russell Martin, first baseman James Loney, right fielder Andre Ethier, center fielder Matt Kemp, and third baseman Blake DeWitt. Los Angeles was hot coming into the NLCS, having won 17–8 games in September and sweeping the Cubs in the NLDS.

== Summary ==
=== Philadelphia Phillies vs. Los Angeles Dodgers ===
Philadelphia won the series, 4–1.

Game	Date	Score	Location	Time	Attendance
1	October 9	Los Angeles Dodgers – 2, Philadelphia Phillies – 3	Citizens Bank Park	2:36	45,839
2	October 10	Los Angeles Dodgers – 5, Philadelphia Phillies – 8	Citizens Bank Park	3:33	45,883
3	October 12	Philadelphia Phillies – 2, Los Angeles Dodgers – 7	Dodger Stadium	2:57	56,800
4	October 13	Philadelphia Phillies – 7, Los Angeles Dodgers – 5	Dodger Stadium	3:44	56,800
5	October 15	Philadelphia Phillies – 5, Los Angeles Dodgers – 1	Dodger Stadium	3:14	56,800

== Game summaries ==
=== Game 1 ===
October 9, 2008 8:23 pm (EDT) at Citizens Bank Park in Philadelphia, Pennsylvania 70 °F (21 °C), mostly cloudy
Team	1	2	3	4	5	6	7	8	9	R	H	E
Los Angeles	1	0	0	1	0	0	0	0	0	2	7	1
Philadelphia	0	0	0	0	0	3	0	0	X	3	7	0
WP: Cole Hamels (1–0) LP: Derek Lowe (0–1) Sv: Brad Lidge (1); Home runs: LAD: None; PHI: Chase Utley (1), Pat Burrell (1); Attendance: 45,839; Boxscore

Derek Lowe and Cole Hamels faced each other at Citizens Bank Park for Game 1. In the first inning, Manny Ramírez missed a home run by mere feet to center field and settled for an RBI double to give LA a 1–0 lead, and later in the fourth, Matt Kemp scored on a sacrifice fly by Blake DeWitt. However, in the sixth inning, as Lowe was rolling, a throwing error by Rafael Furcal put Shane Victorino on second base, apparently breaking the momentum for Lowe, who, on the next pitch, surrendered a game-tying two-run home run to Chase Utley. After a Ryan Howard groundout, Pat Burrell homered to left and put the Phillies out front 3–2, and that would prove to be the final score. Brad Lidge tossed a perfect ninth for the save.

=== Game 2 ===
October 10, 2008 4:35 pm (EDT) at Citizens Bank Park in Philadelphia, Pennsylvania 73 °F (23 °C), sunny
Team	1	2	3	4	5	6	7	8	9	R	H	E
Los Angeles	0	1	1	3	0	0	0	0	0	5	8	1
Philadelphia	0	4	4	0	0	0	0	0	X	8	11	1
WP: Brett Myers (1–0) LP: Chad Billingsley (0–1) Sv: Brad Lidge (2); Home runs: LAD: Manny Ramírez (1); PHI: None; Attendance: 45,883; Boxscore

Philadelphia starting pitcher Brett Myers surprisingly batted 3-for-3 with three RBIs as the Phillies' hot bats chased Dodgers starter Chad Billingsley in the third inning. Billingsley was also criticized for not retaliating for inside pitching by Myers, a response that would have to wait until Game 3 by Dodgers starter Hiroki Kuroda. The Phillies batted through their whole lineup in both the second and third innings, scoring four runs in each. In the second, the Dodgers had runners on second and third with nobody out, but only scored once on a groundout by Blake DeWitt. In the bottom half, Billingsley struck out Pat Burrell and Jayson Werth, but then proceeded to give up five consecutive hits, which included an RBI double by Carlos Ruiz, an RBI single by Myers, and a two-run single by Shane Victorino, giving the Phillies a 4–1 lead. The Dodgers cut their deficit in half in the third with James Loney's RBI single, but the Phillies' offense continued to explode in the bottom half. They loaded the bases with nobody out off Billingsley, leading to a two-run single by Myers and Billingsley getting replaced by Chan Ho Park, who then surrendered a two-run triple to Victorino, increasing Philadelphia's lead to 8–2. Manny Ramírez cut Los Angeles' deficit to 8–5 with a three-run home run off Myers in the fourth, but this proved to be the last scoring play, as the defenses took over the rest of the game. In the seventh, Casey Blake was robbed of a potential two-run double by a leaping Victorino at the left center field wall. Four Phillies relievers pitched scoreless baseball in four innings of work with Brad Lidge remaining perfect in save opportunities in the regular season and postseason. Earlier in the day, Phillies manager Charlie Manuel learned that his mother died, and after the game, Victorino learned that his grandmother died the same day.

=== Game 3 ===
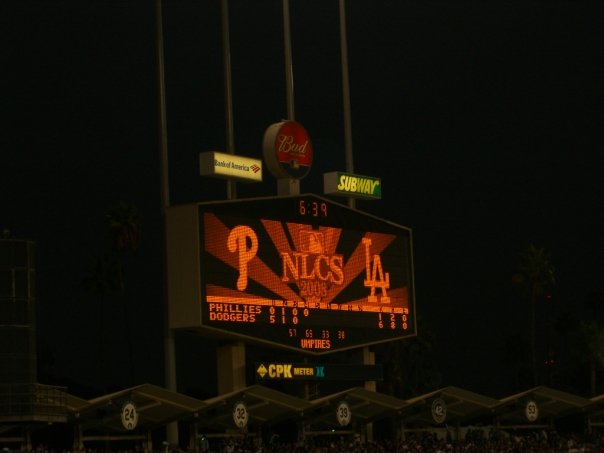
NLCS 2008 Game 3 between the Los Angeles Dodgers and the Philadelphia Phillies played at Dodger Stadium

October 12, 2008 5:24 pm (PDT) at Dodger Stadium in Los Angeles, California 65 °F (18 °C), clear
Team	1	2	3	4	5	6	7	8	9	R	H	E
Philadelphia	0	1	0	0	0	0	1	0	0	2	7	0
Los Angeles	5	1	0	1	0	0	0	0	X	7	10	0
WP: Hiroki Kuroda (1–0) LP: Jamie Moyer (0–1); Home runs: PHI: None; LAD: Rafael Furcal (1); Attendance: 56,800; Boxscore

The first game at Dodger Stadium in the series saw a dramatic benches-clearing incident in the third inning, after Los Angeles starter Hiroki Kuroda threw a fastball over the head of Shane Victorino. This came in apparent retaliation for Phillies starter Jamie Moyer hitting Dodgers catcher Russell Martin in the knee in the first inning and reliever Clay Condrey nearly hitting Martin again in the second, which came after Brett Myers nearly hit Martin and threw behind Manny Ramírez in Game 2. In a wild first inning, the Dodgers scored five runs on Ramírez and Casey Blake's RBI singles and a bases-clearing triple by Blake DeWitt. The Phillies responded in the second with an RBI single by Pedro Feliz, but the Dodgers got that run back in the bottom half on Rafael Furcal's solo home run, which was his first since May 5, increasing their lead to 6–1 and forcing Moyer to leave the game after just 1 1/3 innings. The Dodgers added a run in the fourth on Nomar Garciaparra's RBI single, but Pat Burrell delivered an RBI single of his own for the Phillies in the seventh, making the final score 7–2 in favor of Los Angeles and cutting Philadelphia's lead in the series to 2–1. In the third inning confrontation, only words were exchanged and nobody was ejected, but four players, including Kuroda and Victorino, along with three coaches, were later fined for their involvement in the incident. The attendance was 56,800, an all-time Dodger Stadium record.

=== Game 4 ===
October 13, 2008 5:24 pm (PDT) at Dodger Stadium in Los Angeles, California 70 °F (21 °C), clear
Team	1	2	3	4	5	6	7	8	9	R	H	E
Philadelphia	2	0	0	0	0	1	0	4	0	7	12	1
Los Angeles	1	0	0	0	2	2	0	0	0	5	11	0
WP: Ryan Madson (1–0) LP: Cory Wade (0–1) Sv: Brad Lidge (3); Home runs: PHI: Shane Victorino (1), Matt Stairs (1); LAD: Casey Blake (1); Attendance: 56,800; Boxscore

Game 4 was a seesaw battle between the two teams. The Phillies struck first; Derek Lowe, who started on three days' rest, gave up back-to-back singles to Jimmy Rollins and Jayson Werth to start the game, leading to an RBI double by Chase Utley and an RBI groundout by Ryan Howard, giving Philadelphia an early 2–0 lead. In the bottom of the inning, James Loney hit an RBI double off the center field wall to score Rafael Furcal and cut the lead in half. Phillies starter Joe Blanton began strong, but in the fifth inning, he surrendered an RBI single to Manny Ramírez and an RBI groundout to Russell Martin, giving the Dodgers their first lead of the game, 3–2, and forcing Charlie Manuel to go to his bullpen. In the sixth, the Los Angeles bullpen faltered first when Clayton Kershaw allowed Howard and Pat Burrell to reach base with one out, and Chan Ho Park threw a wild pitch to score Howard and tie the game. The Dodgers immediately took the lead back in the bottom of the sixth, when Chad Durbin gave up a leadoff home run to Casey Blake, then allowed the next two batters aboard with nobody out. Scott Eyre relieved Durbin, but then allowed Furcal to reach on a throwing error by Howard, allowing Juan Pierre to score. After Eyre retired Andre Ethier and intentionally walked Ramírez to load the bases with one out, Ryan Madson relieved Eyre and induced a line drive double play ball from Martin, which was caught by Utley, who stumbled to second base to tag Furcal out, keeping the Los Angeles lead at 5–3. In the eighth, the Dodgers' bullpen completely fell apart. Cory Wade surrendered a game-tying two-run home run to Shane Victorino that landed in the visitor's bullpen. Jonathan Broxton came in after Carlos Ruiz singled off Wade and promptly gave up another two-run homer to pinch-hitter Matt Stairs, the veteran's first career postseason homer, putting the Phillies back in front with a 7–5 lead. Brad Lidge then came in and pitched his first save of 2008 that consisted of more than three outs, his 49th consecutive save.

=== Game 5 ===
October 15, 2008 5:23 pm (PDT) at Dodger Stadium in Los Angeles, California 76 °F (24 °C), mostly cloudy
Team	1	2	3	4	5	6	7	8	9	R	H	E
Philadelphia	1	0	2	0	2	0	0	0	0	5	8	0
Los Angeles	0	0	0	0	0	1	0	0	0	1	7	3
WP: Cole Hamels (2–0) LP: Chad Billingsley (0–2); Home runs: PHI: Jimmy Rollins (1); LAD: Manny Ramírez (2); Attendance: 56,800; Boxscore

Any chance of the Dodgers rallying in the series was quickly dashed as Jimmy Rollins began Game 5 with a leadoff home run off Chad Billingsley, who, in his second bad outing of the series, was knocked out of the game in the third inning after giving up back-to-back RBI singles to Ryan Howard and Pat Burrell. The Phillies added two more runs in the fifth off Greg Maddux when Rafael Furcal committed three errors (two on the same play), allowing Chase Utley and Howard to score. Manny Ramírez, in another strong performance, got the Dodgers on the board with a solo home run in the sixth, but Los Angeles never threatened after that, and the Phillies won the game 5–1, the series 4–1, and their first pennant since 1993. Winning pitcher Cole Hamels was named the series MVP after winning both of his starts with 13 strikeouts, three earned runs off 11 hits, and a 1.93 ERA in 14 total innings pitched.

== Composite box ==
2008 NLCS (4–1): Philadelphia Phillies over Los Angeles Dodgers

Team	1	2	3	4	5	6	7	8	9	R	H	E
Philadelphia Phillies	3	5	6	0	2	4	1	4	0	25	45	2
Los Angeles Dodgers	7	2	1	5	2	3	0	0	0	20	43	5
Total attendance: 262,122 Average attendance: 52,424
