= Matt Stairs =

Canadian baseball player (born 1968)

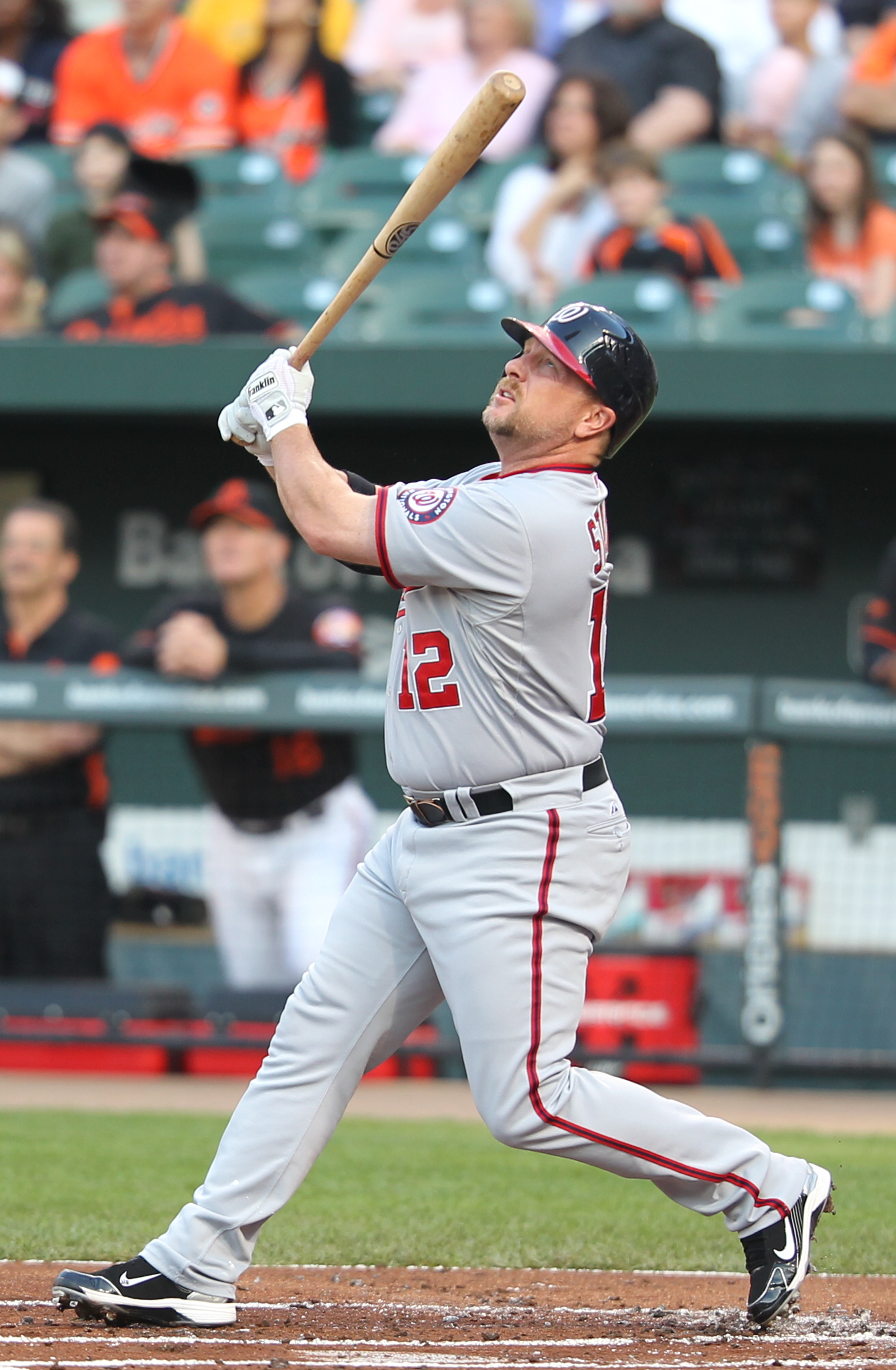
- Stairs with the Washington Nationals in 2011
- Outfielder / Designated hitter / First baseman
- Born: February 27, 1968 (age 58); Saint John, New Brunswick, Canada
- Batted: Left Threw: Right

Professional debut
- MLB: May 29, 1992, for the Montreal Expos
- NPB: June 15, 1993, for the Chunichi Dragons

Last appearance
- NPB: October 18, 1993, for the Chunichi Dragons
- MLB: July 22, 2011, for the Washington Nationals

MLB statistics
- Batting average: .262
- Home runs: 265
- Runs batted in: 899

NPB statistics
- Batting average: .250
- Home runs: 6
- Runs batted in: 23
- Stats at Baseball Reference

Teams
- As player: Montreal Expos (1992–1993); Chunichi Dragons (1993); Boston Red Sox (1995); Oakland Athletics (1996–2000); Chicago Cubs (2001); Milwaukee Brewers (2002); Pittsburgh Pirates (2003); Kansas City Royals (2004–2006); Texas Rangers (2006); Detroit Tigers (2006); Toronto Blue Jays (2007–2008); Philadelphia Phillies (2008–2009); San Diego Padres (2010); Washington Nationals (2011); As coach: Philadelphia Phillies (2017); San Diego Padres (2018)

Career highlights and awards
- World Series champion (2008); MLB record 23 career pinch-hit home runs

Member of the Canadian

Baseball Hall of Fame
- Induction: 2015

Matthew Wade Stairs (born February 27, 1968) is a Canadian former professional baseball outfielder, first baseman, and designated hitter, who holds the record for most pinch-hit home runs in Major League Baseball (MLB) history with 23. His pinch-hit home run in the eighth inning of Game 4 in the 2008 National League Championship Series off the Los Angeles Dodgers reliever Jonathan Broxton was called "one of the most memorable home runs in Phillies history".

In his career, Stairs played for more teams than any position player in MLB history (12—technically 13 teams, but 12 franchises, as he played for the Montreal Expos and Washington Nationals); Edwin Jackson and Rich Hill hold the record for pitchers and all players at 14. Additionally, he is one of only four Canadians to have played for both the Toronto Blue Jays and Montreal Expos, the others being Denis Boucher, Rob Ducey, and Shawn Hill.

He was the second Canadian-born player ever to hit more than thirty-five home runs in a season, and only the second to hit more than 25 home runs and drive in more than 100 runs in back-to-back seasons. He ranks either first or second in power hitting categories for Canadian major leaguers. Stairs also holds the all-time MLB record of home runs hit as a pinch-hitter with 23. His ability to pinch hit made him a valuable asset to several teams and earned him the nickname "Matt Stairs – Professional Hitter". Stairs, Larry Walker, Justin Morneau, Jason Bay, and Joey Votto are the only Canadian MLB players to hit at least 200 career home runs. On February 4, 2015, Stairs was elected to the Canadian Baseball Hall of Fame.

== Early life ==
Born in Saint John and raised in Tay Creek, New Brunswick, Stairs showed athletic ability at an early age, playing Beaver League baseball a year before his age eligibility; he also excelled in hockey. After playing Bantam & Midget baseball at age 16 and 17, he played for the local Marysville Royals of the New Brunswick Senior Baseball League and was voted "Rookie of The Year" in 1984 and the league's Most Valuable Player in 1985. He was also named Nova Scotia Senior Baseball League MVP in 1987 and '88 while playing for the Fredericton Schooners.

He attended the National Baseball Institute (NBI) in Vancouver, British Columbia, for one year and played for Canada at the 1987 World Amateur Championships in Italy where he was named to the "World All-Star" team. In 1988, he joined the Canadian Junior National team after graduating from Fredericton High School. From there he went on to play for the Canadian Olympic Team at the 1988 Summer Olympics in Seoul, South Korea.

== Minor league career ==
On January 17, 1989, Stairs was signed as an international free agent by the Montreal Expos. Stairs was then assigned to low single-A Jamestown Expos where he played second and third base. He played Double-A ball in Harrisburg, Pennsylvania for the Harrisburg Senators, where he led the league in hitting and was voted the Eastern League's 1991 Most Valuable Player. In 1992 and 1993, he moved up to Triple-A (Indianapolis and Ottawa, respectively), with only brief appearances in the majors. Over his career, Stairs has played for six other minor league teams: The Indianapolis Indians (Triple-A) in 1992, the Ottawa Lynx (Triple-A) in 1993, the New Britain Red Sox (Double-A) in 1994, the Pawtucket Red Sox (Triple-A) in 1995, the Edmonton Trappers (Triple-A) in 1996 and a few rehab games for the Nashville Sounds (Triple-A) in 2003. His totals in the minors include a .291 batting average with 46 home runs and 237 RBI.

On June 8, 1993, Stairs' contract was purchased by the Chunichi Dragons of the NPB. He played 60 games for the Dragons that season, hitting .250, with six home runs and 23 RBI in 142 at-bats.

== Major league career ==
=== Montreal Expos ===
Stairs began his Major League career in 1992 with the Montreal Expos, with whom he played sporadically throughout the season. On December 15, 1993, he was re-signed as a free agent by Montreal. He ended up only playing in 19 games for the Expos from 1992 to 1993. Stairs was sold on February 18, 1994, to the Boston Red Sox and assigned to the Double-A New Britain Red Sox for the 1994 season, where he batted .309 with nine home runs and 61 RBI in 93 games.

=== Boston Red Sox ===
He started the 1995 season with the Pawtucket farm club until being called up to the major leagues in June 1995. He played in 39 games for the Red Sox, hitting .261 with a home run and 17 RBI. At the end of the season, he accepted an offer to play with the Oakland Athletics after becoming a free agent.

=== Oakland Athletics ===
Stairs had the best years of his career playing for the Athletics. He was called up from Triple-A Edmonton after compiling a .344 average with eight home runs and 41 RBI over the first 51 games in the International League. He played mostly in right field and as a designated hitter, alongside superstars Rickey Henderson, Mark McGwire, and Jose Canseco, throughout his tenure in Oakland.

In his July 5, 1996, debut with Oakland, Stairs tied a major league record with six runs batted in during one inning. That first inning performance included a grand slam and a two-run single (subsequently broken by Fernando Tatís in 1999). In 1999, he finished 17th in the American League in the MVP race with a .258 batting average, 38 home runs and 102 RBI in 146 games.

After five seasons with the Athletics, during which he hit 122 home runs and drove in 315 RBI, he was traded on November 20, 2000, to the Chicago Cubs for minor league pitcher Eric Ireland. The trade was largely seen as a cost-cutting move by the cash-strapped Athletics—Stairs was set to earn $3.2 million for the 2001 season, and his production had dropped in 2000, hitting just .227 with 21 home runs and 81 RBI.

=== Chicago Cubs ===
On December 19, 2000, Stairs agreed to a one-year, $3.2 million contract with the Cubs to avoid arbitration. He served as the first baseman for the Cubs in 2001. Stairs had an OBP of .358 and batted .250 with 17 home runs and 61 RBI in 128 games. He then became a free agent after the season.

=== Milwaukee Brewers ===
On January 25, 2002, Stairs signed a one-year, $500,000 contract with the Milwaukee Brewers for the 2002 season. In 2002, Stairs had a similar season to the previous one with the Cubs. He finished the season with 16 home runs and 41 RBI in 107 games, but still had a low batting average, hitting .244.

=== Pittsburgh Pirates ===
On December 16, 2002, Stairs agreed to a one-year, $900,000 contract with the Pittsburgh Pirates. 2003 was a strong year for Stairs. He finished the year batting .292 with 20 home runs and 57 RBI in 128 games while playing as a first baseman and outfielder. Stairs' 2003 season included a three-game series back in Canada against the Blue Jays. In the three games at Rogers Centre (then called the Skydome), Stairs had five hits in eight at-bats, which included two long home runs.

=== Kansas City Royals ===
On December 9, 2003, Stairs signed a one-year deal with the Kansas City Royals. He went on to enjoy three solid years with the Royals, hitting 39 home runs in his two-and-a-half years in Kansas City. Despite being on one of the worst teams in baseball, Stairs helped some of the younger players like John Buck and David DeJesus adjust to the majors. On July 31, 2006, at the trade deadline, Stairs was dealt to the Texas Rangers for Joselo Díaz.

=== Texas Rangers ===
The Rangers hoped that Stairs could provide some veteran leadership on their club, but he just played in 26 games, batting .210 with three home runs and 11 RBI before being waived by the Rangers. He was picked up off waivers by the Detroit Tigers on September 15, 2006.

=== Detroit Tigers ===
On the day he was claimed, he immediately went to Detroit, arriving at Comerica Park halfway through the game and immediately taking Marcus Thames's place in the lineup. The Tigers picked up Stairs in hopes that his experience could help them hold their division lead. The Tigers lost their division lead on the final day of the season, but still clinched the Wild Card. In 14 games with the Tigers, Stairs batted .244 with two home runs and 8 RBI. Since he was acquired after August 31, the deadline for playoff eligible players, he was unable to play for the Tigers during the playoffs. The Tigers went on to win the AL Pennant and lost in the World Series to the St. Louis Cardinals. He did not re-sign with the Tigers following the season.

=== Toronto Blue Jays ===
On December 7, 2006, Stairs and the Toronto Blue Jays agreed to a one-year minor-league contract with an invitation to spring training. He made the team and saw significant playing time as the fourth outfielder, replacing Lyle Overbay at first base during Overbay's time on the DL. The 2007 season rejuvenated Stairs' career, due to increased playing time following injuries to Reed Johnson and Overbay. Unexpectedly playing every day, he performed well above expectations, providing consistency at the plate and a valuable veteran presence in the Toronto dugout; team manager John Gibbons publicly stated, "I don't know where we'd be without him." As of September 4, Stairs had the highest slugging average on the Jays at .606 and the highest batting average at .312.

On August 8, 2007, Stairs became the first Toronto Blue Jays player to hit five consecutive doubles in five at-bats, and the first Major Leaguer to double in five straight at-bats in 14 years since Charles Johnson accomplished the feat in 1993. As of September 8, 2007, Stairs was playing well for the Blue Jays, with a team-leading .315 average on the season and a .989 OPS. He finished the season batting .289 with 21 home runs and 64 RBIs.

On November 2, 2007, Stairs and the Blue Jays agreed on a two-year, $3.25 million contract, which included a $1.25 million signing bonus and a $1 million base salary in each of the two seasons. With performance bonuses, Stairs could make as much as $3.5 million based on plate appearances.

Though his age and increasingly poor speed earned him a reputation as a defensive liability in the outfield, he still possessed a strong throwing arm, and was considered a perfectly capable fielder at first. In 2008, Stairs initially platooned in left field with Shannon Stewart; however, upon the club's release of Frank Thomas on April 20 Stairs became the everyday DH for the ball club, although was later designated for assignment on August 28, 2008.

=== Philadelphia Phillies ===
On August 30, 2008, Stairs was traded to the Philadelphia Phillies for Fabio Castro.

Stairs hit his first career postseason home run on October 13, 2008, in Game 4 of the 2008 National League Championship Series against the Los Angeles Dodgers off Jonathan Broxton, allowing the Phillies to take the lead and win the game.

He won the first World Series ring of his 16-year career on October 29, 2008, when the Phillies won the series against the Rays, four games to one. On April 12, 2009, Stairs' game-winning home run against the Colorado Rockies was the last home run called by broadcaster Harry Kalas, who died unexpectedly less than 24 hours later.

Stairs faced Broxton again in the ninth inning of Game 4 of the 2009 NLCS rematch between the Phillies and Dodgers at Citizens Bank Park in Philadelphia. Broxton pitched around Stairs, walking him on four pitches. The Phillies won the game later in the inning on a walk-off double by Jimmy Rollins, on which Stairs' pinch runner Eric Bruntlett scored. In the 2009 season, he once again made it to the World Series, but the Phillies lost to the New York Yankees in six games.

During his time with the team, T-shirts were marketed which touched on Stairs' pinch-hitting prowess in clutch situations. They used a warning which can be found in many elevators: "In Case of Emergency, Use Stairs."

=== San Diego Padres ===
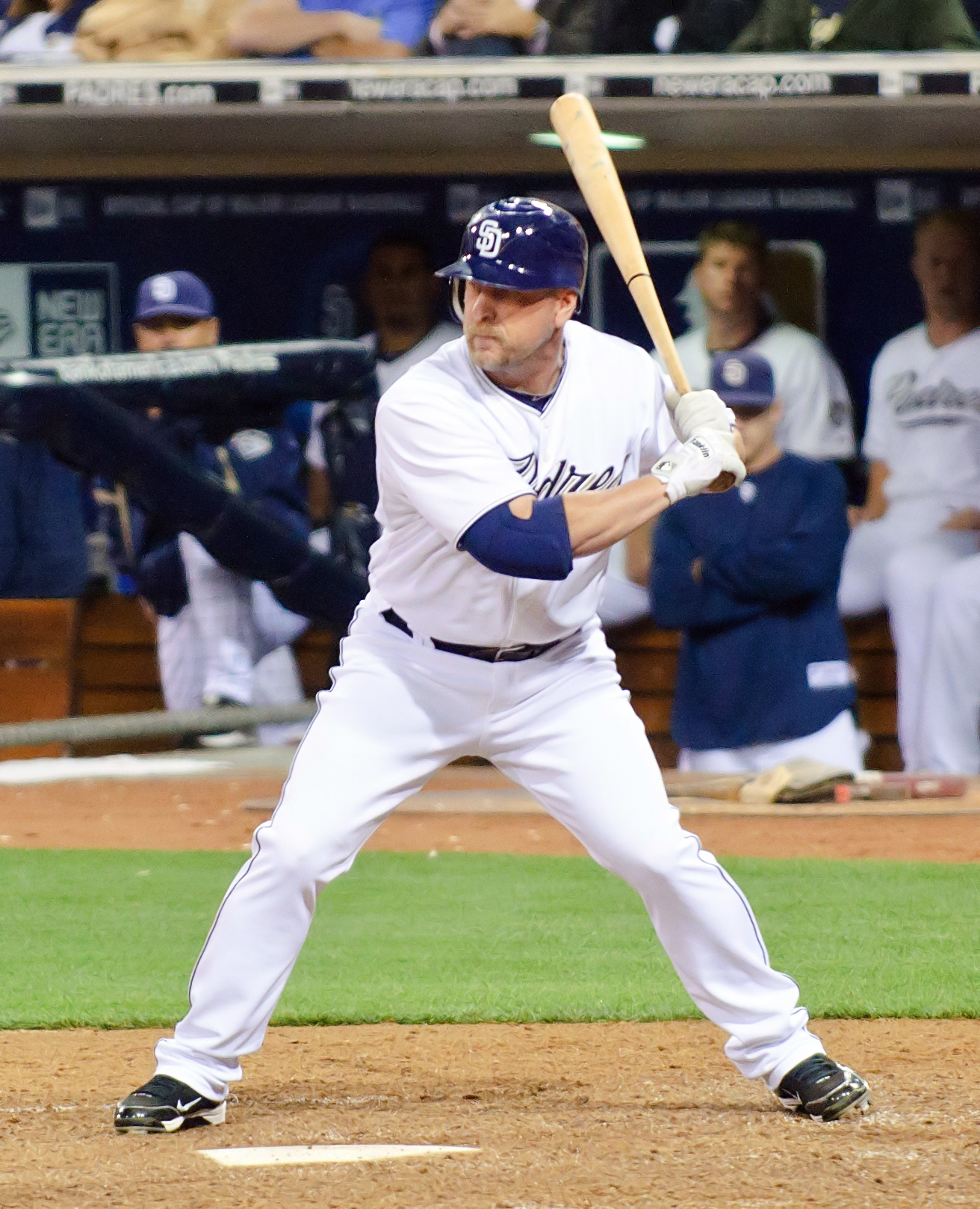
Stairs batting for the San Diego Padres in 2010.

On January 23, 2010, Stairs agreed to a minor league contract with the San Diego Padres with an invite to spring training hoping to crack their 25-man roster out of spring as a left-handed bat off the bench. During the offseason, he lost nearly 40 pounds, which helped him make the team out of spring training. When he joined the Padres, he became the only player in MLB history to play for all four of the 1969 expansion teams (the Padres, Royals, Expos, and Brewers). On August 21, Stairs hit his 21st home run as a pinch hitter to break a tie with Cliff Johnson for the Major League record.

=== Washington Nationals ===
On December 14, 2010, the Washington Nationals signed Stairs to a non-guaranteed minor league contract, which included an invitation to Major League Spring training. After spring training, he was placed on the 25-man roster and went north with the team. Mostly used as a pinch hitter, with four appearances at first base, in 65 at-bats he had 10 hits and two RBIs. He was designated for assignment on July 27, 2011. He was released on August 1 and announced his retirement two days later.

== Coaching career ==
On November 2, 2016, Stairs was hired as the hitting coach for the Philadelphia Phillies.

On October 30, 2017, Stairs was hired as the hitting coach for the San Diego Padres. He was fired after one season.

In 2024, Stairs was hired to the Okotoks Dawgs Baseball Club as the program’s Academy Coaching Staff as the Dawgs Hitting Coordinator.

== Career perspective ==
Noted baseball analysts Bill James and Joe Posnanski have theorized that Stairs is probably a far more talented hitter than his career stats suggest. Stairs didn't have 500 plate appearances until age 30, at which point he had recorded 100 RBI seasons and an adjusted OPS of over 130 two years in a row—and never exceeded 500 plate appearances again after three straight seasons of 500 or more from 1998–2000. James contends, "You put him in the right park, right position early in his career ... he's going to hit a LOT of bombs." Possibly, Posnanski contends, enough to have been worthy of Hall of Fame consideration.

== Other work and personal life ==
In January 2012, Stairs accepted a job with the NESN sports news station to work as a Boston Red Sox studio analyst. On February 11, 2014, the Phillies announced that Stairs and fellow former-Phillie Jamie Moyer would join the team's television broadcasting crew as color analysts, following the dismissal of Gary Matthews and Chris Wheeler. Stairs worked with play-by-play commentator Tom McCarthy and in-game reporter Gregg Murphy, and occasionally with Ben Davis, before moving to the Phillies' dugout as the team's hitting coach starting with the 2017 season.

He is married to Lisa Astle of Fredericton with whom he has three daughters, Nicole, Alicia and Chandler. He lives in Fredericton and was named coach of the Fredericton High School ice hockey team in 2012, a job he had often referred to as his dream.

Stairs was inducted into the New Brunswick Sports Hall of Fame in June 2012.

On June 15, 2015, Stairs was inducted into the Canadian Baseball Hall of Fame.

In November 2016, Stairs was among those nominated and placed on the 2017 ballot for the Baseball Hall of Fame; he did not receive enough votes to appear on future ballots.

== See also ==
- List of Major League Baseball career home run leaders

Awards and achievements
Preceded by Jamie Moyer	Oldest Player in the National League; 2011	Succeeded by Jamie Moyer
