= Chad Billingsley =

American baseball player (born 1984)

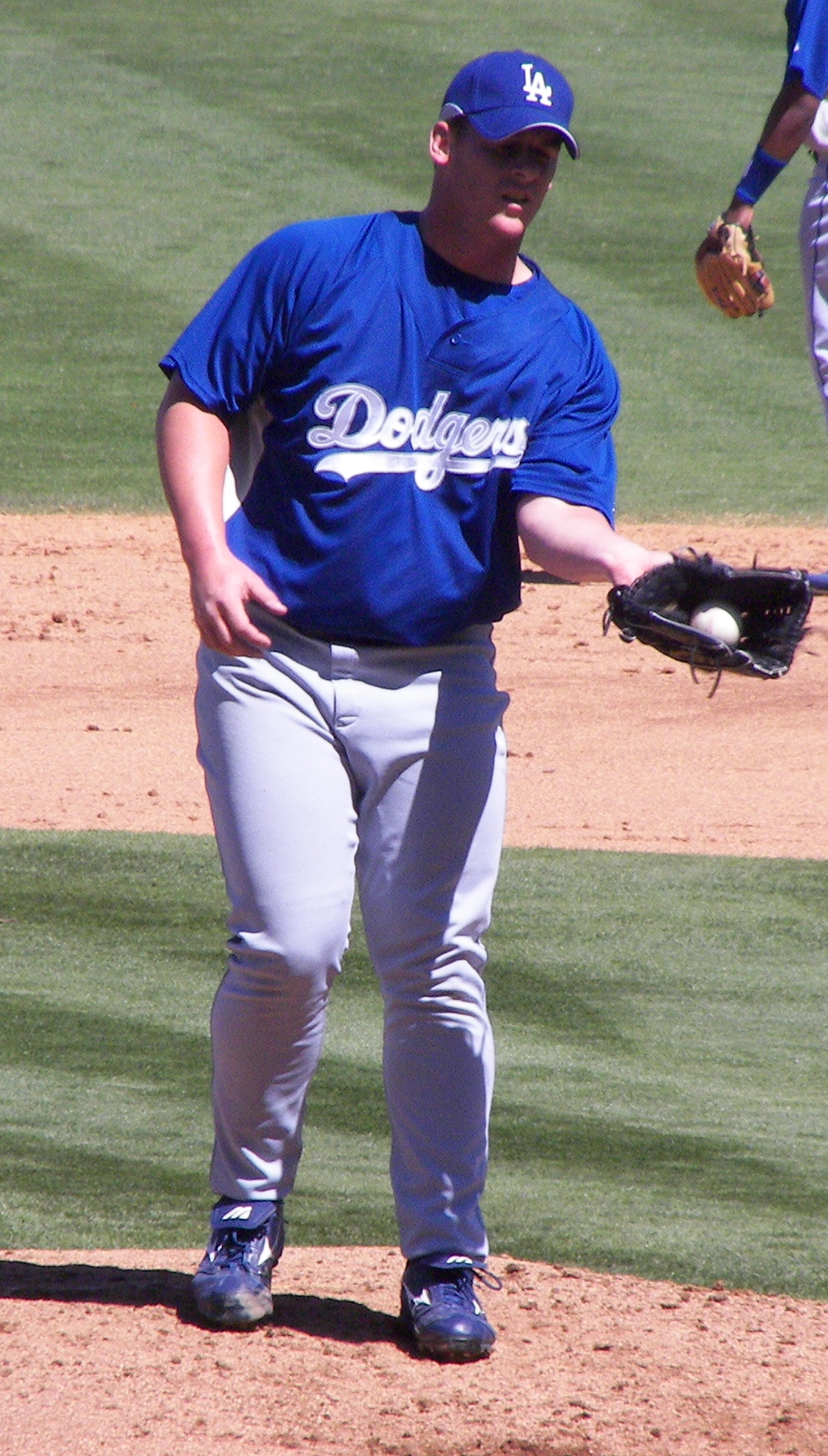
- Billingsley with the Los Angeles Dodgers
- Pitcher
- Born: July 29, 1984 (age 42); Defiance, Ohio, U.S.
- Batted: Right Threw: Right

MLB debut
- June 15, 2006, for the Los Angeles Dodgers

Last MLB appearance
- July 18, 2015, for the Philadelphia Phillies

MLB statistics
- Win–loss record: 83–64
- Earned run average: 3.72
- Strikeouts: 1,052
- Stats at Baseball Reference

Teams
- Los Angeles Dodgers (2006–2013); Philadelphia Phillies (2015)

Career highlights and awards
- All-Star (2009)
Medals
Men's baseball
Representing United States
World Junior Baseball Championship
Bronze medal – third place	2002 Sherbrooke	Team

Chad Ryan Billingsley (born July 29, 1984) is an American former professional baseball right-handed starting pitcher. He played in Major League Baseball (MLB) for the Los Angeles Dodgers from 2006 through 2013 and Philadelphia Phillies in 2015. He was a National League (NL) All-Star in 2009.

== Early life ==
Billingsley attended Defiance High School in Defiance, Ohio, and played for the school's baseball team. Billingsley was a high school teammate of Major League pitcher Jon Niese. He was named to the Rawlings All-American first team in his junior year as a utility player and as a pitcher in his senior year. As a senior in 2003, Billinglsey posted a 1.21 earned-run average and 138 strikeouts in 69 innings. He also had a .383 batting average with 93 runs batted in and 24 home runs as a senior. Billingsley finished high school with a state-record 502 strikeouts.

He also played American Legion Baseball in Ohio and was named the organization's Graduate of the Year for 2013.

He pitched three games and went 3–0 with a 2.45 ERA for Team USA, which won the bronze medal in the 2002 World Junior Baseball Championship in Sherbrooke, Quebec.

He committed to attend the University of South Carolina.

== Draft and minor leagues ==
The Los Angeles Dodgers selected Billingsley in the first round, with the 24th overall selection, in the 2003 Major League Baseball draft. He signed with the Dodgers, receiving a signing bonus of $1.375 million.

Billingsley pitched in 2003 for the Ogden Raptors of the Rookie-level Pioneer League, compiling a record of 5–4 with a 2.83 ERA. He went 7–4 with a 2.35 ERA for the Vero Beach Dodgers of the Class A-Advanced Florida State League in 2004, before being promoted to the Jacksonville Suns of the Class AA Southern League, where he pitched through 2005. He was 13–6 with a 3.51 ERA for Jacksonville in 2005. He started 2006 with the Las Vegas 51s of the Class AAA Pacific Coast League before being promoted to the Dodgers. According to Baseball America, Billingsley was the number one prospect in the Dodgers organization prior to being recalled to the major league roster in June 2006.

== Major leagues ==
=== Los Angeles Dodgers ===
Billingsley made his Major League Baseball debut with the Los Angeles Dodgers on June 15, 2006, against the San Diego Padres at Petco Park in San Diego, California. In his debut, Billingsley started on the mound, pitched 5 1/3 innings and surrendered 6 hits and 2 runs while striking out three. He even knocked in two runs in his first official at-bat (hit by pitch in his first plate appearance) to help his cause. His debut was considered a success as the Dodgers went on to defeat the Padres 7–3 (although Billingsley did not get credited with the win). Billingsley remained in the starting rotation for the rest of the season, but started 2007 in the bullpen. He pitched well in relief and was returned to the starting rotation on June 21 after season-ending surgery placed Jason Schmidt on the disabled list.

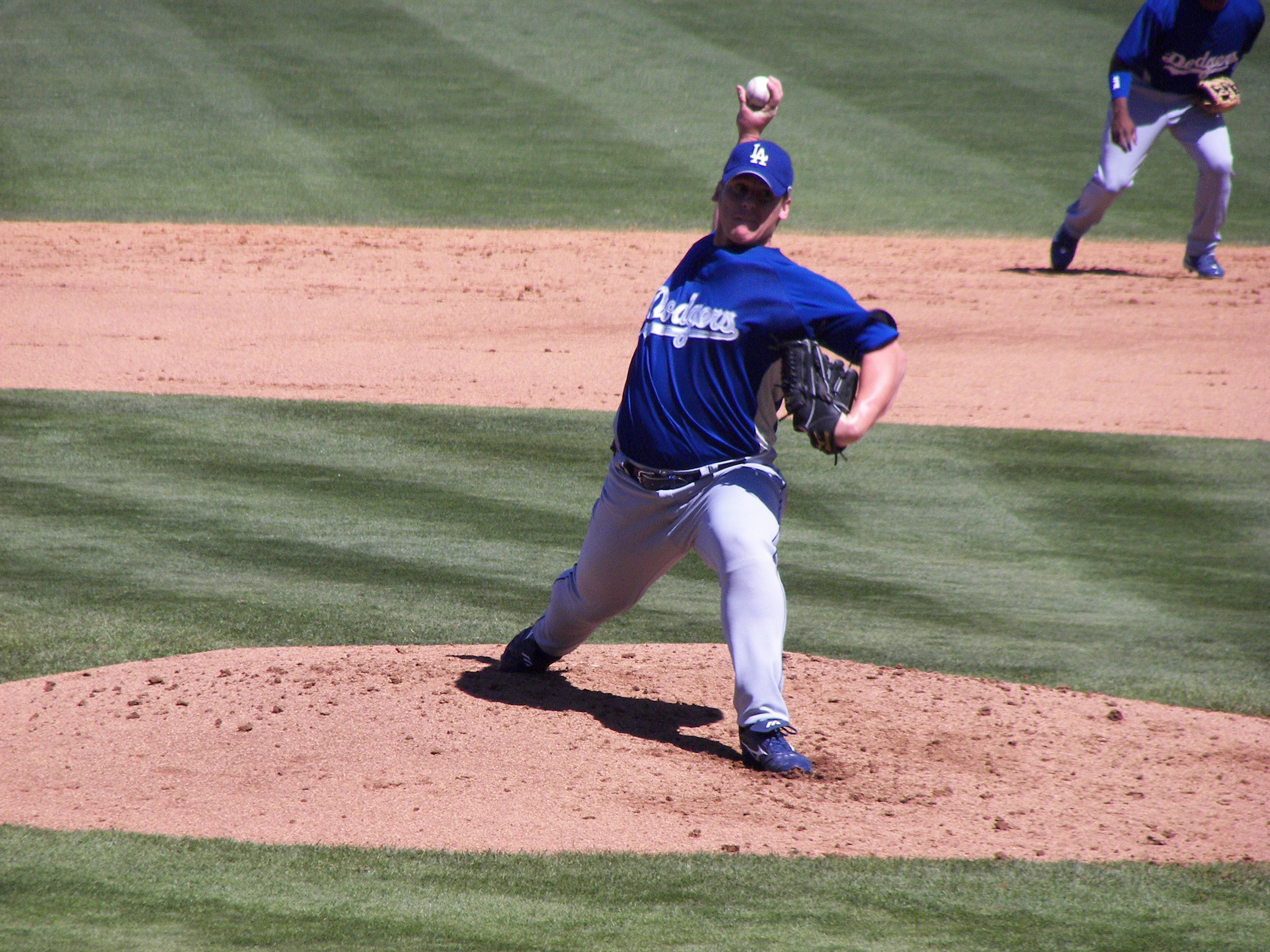
Billingsley in spring 2007

In 2008, Billingsley elevated to one of the top pitchers in the National League while demonstrating his potential as an ace. He finished the year with a 16–10 record, was 5th in the NL (and 9th in the majors) with 201 strikeouts, and recorded an ERA of 3.14 and a WHIP of 1.34 in 200.2 innings pitched. Billingsley pitched his first career complete game shutout against the San Francisco Giants on July 30, 2008, allowing five hits and recording eight strikeouts without allowing a walk. On September 6, Billingsley faced Arizona ace Brandon Webb and helped to hold him off long enough for a Manny Ramirez homer, and a 7–2 win, his 14th of the season.

Billingsley also started 3 postseason games for the Dodgers in 2008. In his first postseason appearance, Billingsley pitched a strong 6 2/3 innings, while allowing just one run against the Chicago Cubs. The Dodgers won the game 10–3. However, in his next two starts, Billingsley was not nearly as effective. Lasting only 2 1/3 innings, Billingsley was torched for 8 runs (7 earned) in an 8–5 loss to the Philadelphia Phillies in Game 2 and 2 2/3 innings, while giving up 3 earned runs, in Game 5 of the 2008 NLCS. He received some criticism for not brushing back (i.e., pitching far inside) to Phillies batters when Dodgers hitters were knocked down several times.

On November 21, 2008, Billingsley slipped on ice outside his South Heidelberg Township home, and suffered a spiral fracture of the fibula in his left leg. However, the injury was healed by the time spring training began.

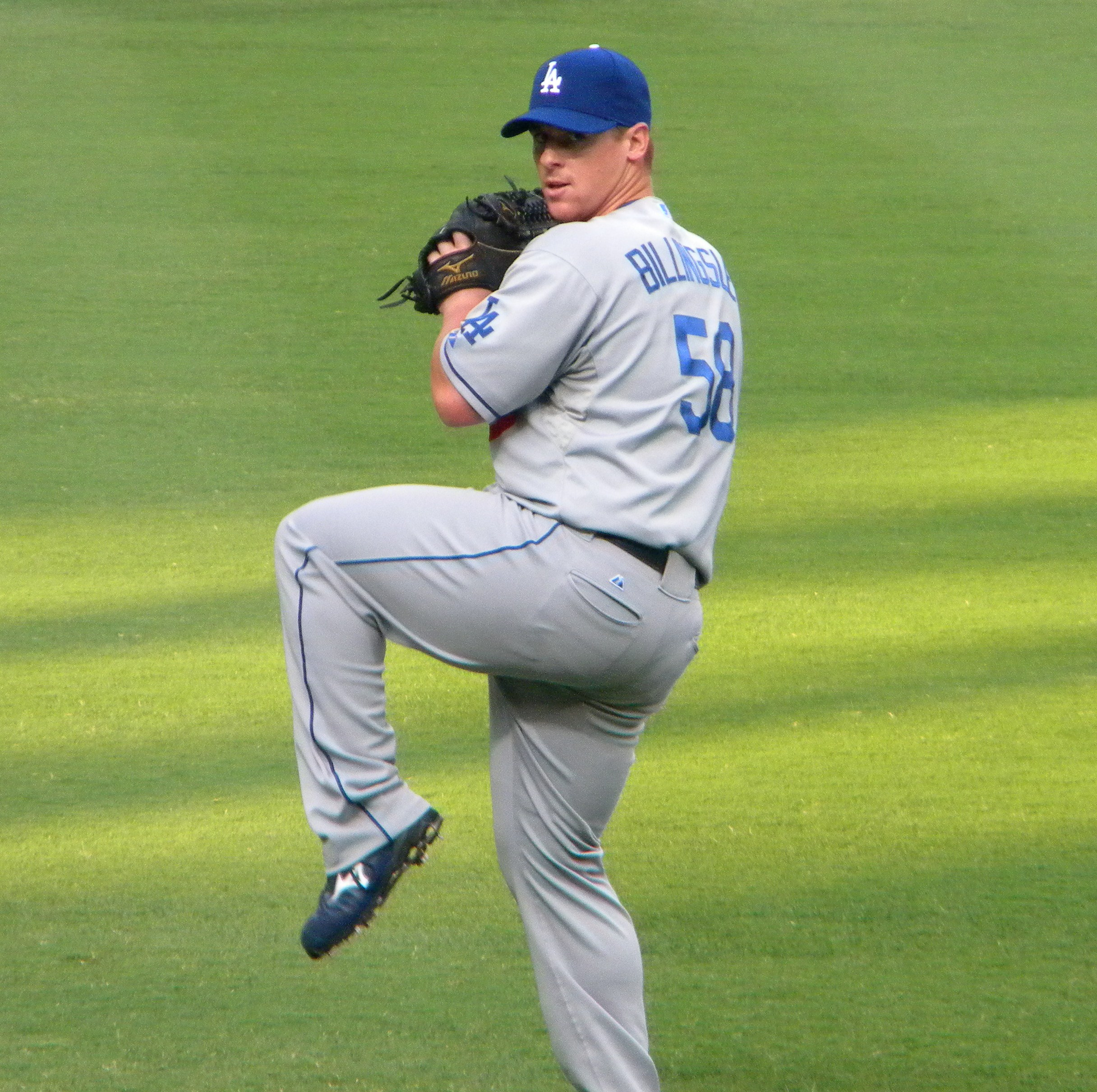
Billingsley warming up before a game against the Atlanta Braves

In 2009, Billingsley started well, winning his first five decisions and posted a 7-inning, 11-strikeout performance against the San Francisco Giants on April 13. On July 5, 2009, Billingsley hit his first career home run off Josh Banks in a 7–6 Dodgers win against the San Diego Padres. He was selected to the 2009 National League All-Star Team. However, he struggled in the second half of the season and finished the year 12–11 with a 4.03 ERA in 32 starts and pitched out of the bullpen in the playoffs.

In 2010, he had a solid season, finishing 12–11 with a 3.57 ERA in 31 starts and also pitched one complete game shutout, on July 21 against the San Francisco Giants.

Billingsley signed a 3-year $35 million extension during spring training in 2011. The season, however, was a disappointment. With an 11–11 record, it was the first season he failed to finish with a winning record. His ERA was 4.21 (the highest of his career), and his 152 strikeouts were the fewest since becoming a full-time starter in 2008.

In a loss to the Arizona Diamondbacks on July 7, 2012, Billingsley recorded his 1,000th strikeout and in doing so, became the 12th Dodgers pitcher to reach the milestone. Billingsley finished the 2012 season with a 10–9 record and 3.55 ERA in 25 starts. On September 5, 2012, it was announced that Billingsley had a partial tear in his ulnar collateral ligament, the type that usually requires Tommy John surgery. Billingsley was shut down for the rest of the 2012 season.

Rather than undergoing off-season surgery and missing the entire 2013 season, Billingsley chose to try to treat the injury with platelet-rich plasma injections. However, after just 2 starts in 2013 he felt pain in the elbow again. An MRI revealed that the tear had returned. Billingsley underwent Tommy John surgery on April 24 and missed the rest of the 2013 season.

Billingsley rehabbed his injury in an attempt to return in 2014, but after a couple of minor league rehab starts he experienced some discomfort in his elbow. An MRI revealed that he had torn his flexor tendon in the elbow and he was shut down again.

Later in 2014, Billingsley underwent a season-ending surgery to repair this same torn flexor tendon. The Dodgers declined his 2015 option on October 31, 2014, making him a free agent.

=== Philadelphia Phillies ===
On January 29, 2015, Billingsley signed a one-year deal with the Philadelphia Phillies. He began the 2015 season on the 15-day disabled list to recover from his previous elbow surgery and made his debut with the Phillies on May 5, 2015. He became a free agent following the season.

== Pitching style ==
Billingsley was a versatile pitcher, throwing four pitches with regularity and another two infrequently. He led with a four-seam fastball at 90–93 mph and a sinker at 90–92 mph. He featured a cut fastball in the upper 80s, an occasional slider in the mid 80s, a changeup in the mid-high 80s, and a curveball that is usually in the upper 70s. (Occasionally, he threw it as slowly as 65 mph, so that it resembled an eephus pitch.) Billingsley typically worked right-handed hitters with all of his pitches except for his slider and changeup. Against lefties, he used the changeup more frequently. He used his curveball in many two-strike counts once he established the strike zone with fastballs.

== Post-playing career ==
In January 2018, Billingsley was named head baseball coach at Conrad Weiser High School in Pennsylvania. Billingsley resigned from the position in June 2021 (can't be verified).
