= James Loney =

American baseball player (born 1984)

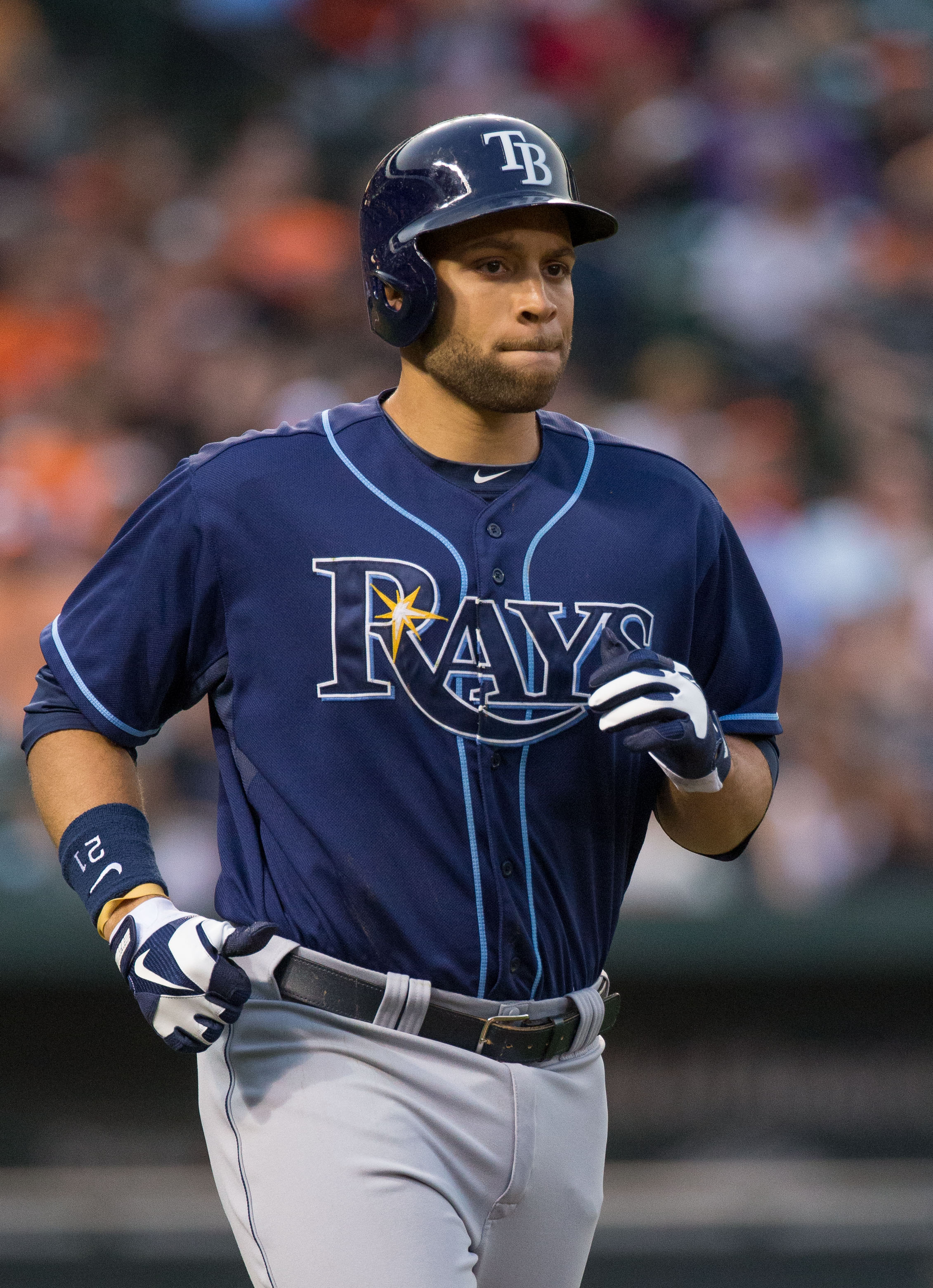
- Loney with the Tampa Bay Rays in 2013
- First baseman
- Born: May 7, 1984 (age 42); Houston, Texas, U.S.
- Batted: Left Threw: Left

Professional debut
- MLB: April 4, 2006, for the Los Angeles Dodgers
- KBO: July 27, 2017, for the LG Twins

Last appearance
- MLB: October 2, 2016, for the New York Mets
- KBO: August 25, 2017, for the LG Twins

MLB statistics
- Batting average: .284
- Home runs: 108
- Runs batted in: 669

KBO statistics
- Batting average: .278
- Home runs: 3
- Runs batted in: 12
- Stats at Baseball Reference

Teams
- Los Angeles Dodgers (2006–2012); Boston Red Sox (2012); Tampa Bay Rays (2013–2015); New York Mets (2016); LG Twins (2017)

James Anthony Loney (born May 7, 1984) is an American former professional baseball first baseman. He played in Major League Baseball (MLB) for the Los Angeles Dodgers, Boston Red Sox, Tampa Bay Rays, and New York Mets, and in the KBO League for the LG Twins.

== Early career ==
James Anthony Loney was born on May 7, 1984, in Houston, Texas, to Marion, known as Tony, and Annie (née Pavelchak) Loney (1958–2023). His father, who is African-American was a computer programmer and software consultant and his mother, who was Polish-American worked as a teacher. Loney has a younger brother named Anthony.

Loney played baseball on a team sponsored by the Reviving Baseball in Inner Cities program and was coached at Elkins High School by Matt Carpenter's father Rick. In Loney's senior year, his high school team was ranked first in the nation by Baseball America and won the 5A state championship. Loney contributed a 12–1 record with a 1.52 ERA and 120 strikeouts as a pitcher that season, as well as a .500 batting average, eight home runs, 38 runs scored and 58 runs batted in. He was named to the Texas Sports Writers Association 5A all-state team at the end of the 2002 baseball season, as well as Powerade and Gatorade Player of the Year.

Much of the professional interest in Loney centered on his pitching ability, but he was drafted by the Los Angeles Dodgers in the first round, #19 overall, of the 2002 Major League Baseball draft as a position player. He had signed with Baylor University to play college baseball, but opted to sign a pro contract.

== Professional career ==
=== Los Angeles Dodgers ===
Loney began his professional career in 2002 with the Great Falls Dodgers, where he hit .371 and was named the top prospect in the Pioneer League by Baseball America. Loney also appeared in 17 games that year for Single-A Vero Beach, batting .299. He returned to Vero Beach for 2003, and in 125 games he hit .276 with 7 homers and 46 RBIs. He was listed #34 on the 2003 edition of Baseball America's Top 100 Prospects list.

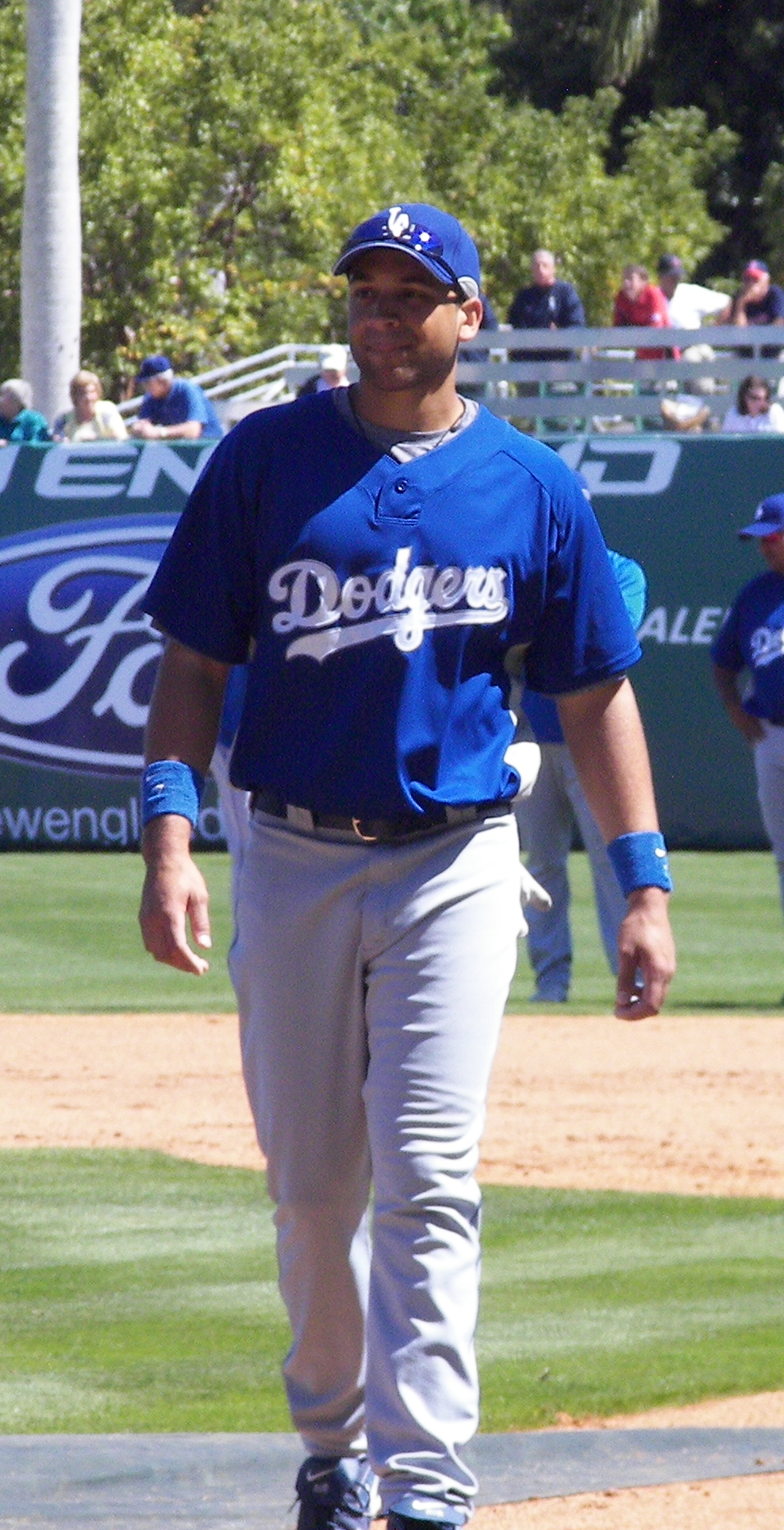
Loney during 2007 spring training in Florida.

In 2004, Loney was highly ranked for his defensive ability in the Arizona Fall League and made the All-Prospect Team voted on by league managers and coaches. However, he had an injury plagued season at Double-A Jacksonville and fell to #42 on Baseball America's prospect list. In 2005, Loney led the Southern League Champion Jacksonville Suns in hits and total bases. That season, he was ranked #62 on Baseball America's list of top prospects.

In 2006, Loney led all of baseball with a .380 average while playing for the Triple-A Las Vegas 51s. He was named the Dodgers Minor League Player of the Year and was chosen as first-team Triple-A All-Star First Baseman by Baseball America.

==== Major Leagues ====
Loney made his major league debut with the Dodgers on April 4, 2006, against the Atlanta Braves after starting Dodgers first baseman Nomar Garciaparra was placed on the disabled list. Loney collected a single in his first major league at bat, against John Smoltz.

On September 28, in a game against the Colorado Rockies, Loney went 4 for 5 with 9 runs batted in, which tied a 56-year Dodgers franchise record for RBI in a single game, held by Gil Hodges. Loney went 3-for-4 with three RBI in game three of the National League Division Series against the New York Mets.

Loney started the 2007 season at Triple-A Las Vegas after the Dodgers re-signed Garciaparra. On June 10, 2007, Loney was recalled to the Dodgers. He took over the first base job, with Garciaparra moving to third base.

Loney hit nine home runs in September 2007, setting a Dodgers record for home runs by a rookie in a calendar month that he shares with Joc Pederson (May 2015). Loney was named the National League Rookie of the Month for September and finished sixth in the voting for the 2007 NL Sporting News Rookie of the Year Award.

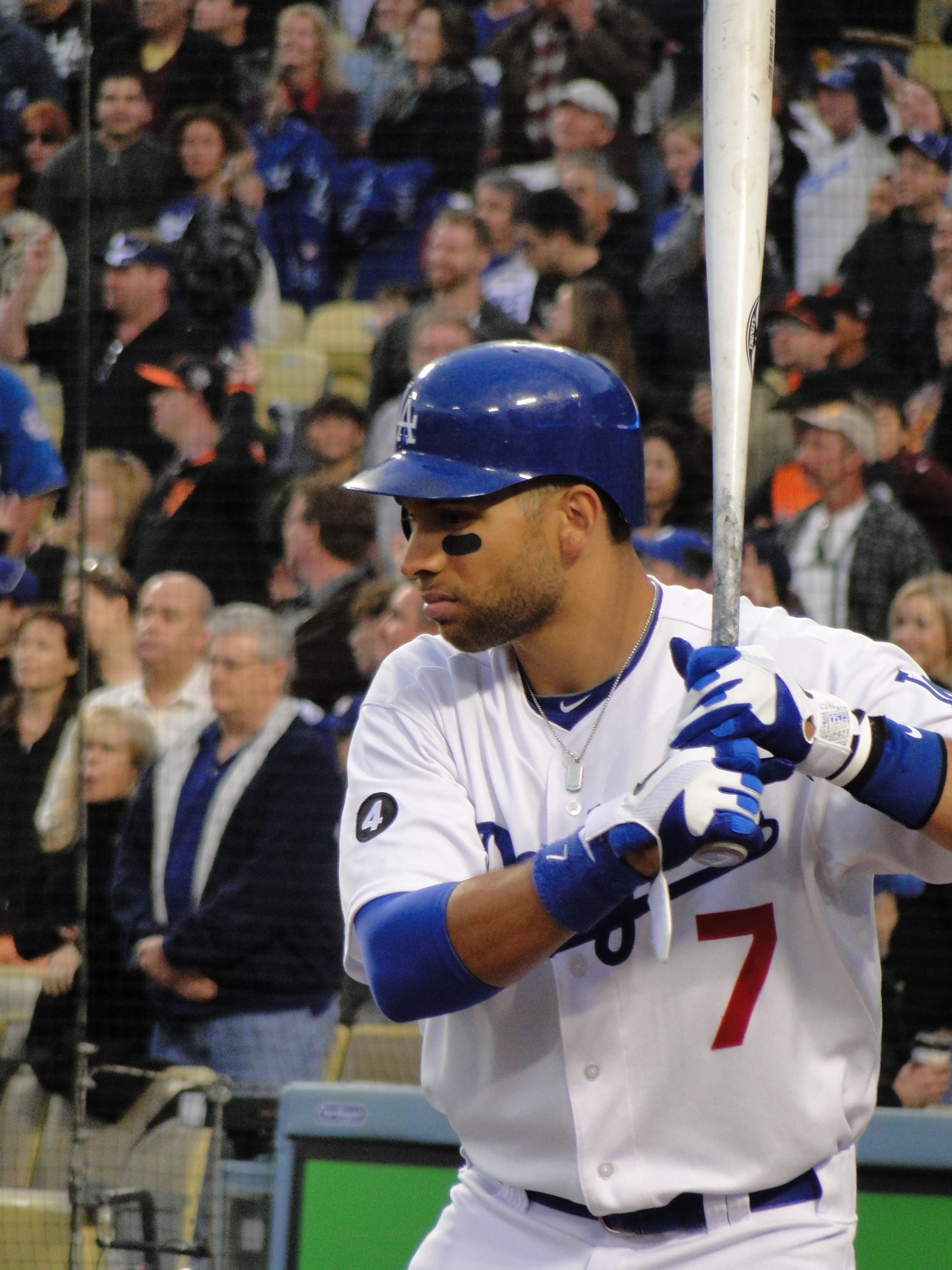
Loney in the on-deck circle at Dodger Stadium, 2011.

Loney was a unanimous selection to the 2007 Topps Major League Rookie All-Star Team. The selection was the result of the 49th annual Topps balloting of major league managers.

Loney began the season as the starting first baseman and had a 15-game hitting streak. He finished the season batting .289 with 13 HR and 90 RBIs. Loney led the team in runs batted in consistently for the entire year. On October 1, 2008, in Game 1 of the National League Division Series, Loney hit a grand slam off of Chicago Cubs pitcher Ryan Dempster as the Dodgers went on to win the game 7–2.

Loney turned in numbers in 2009 similar to his 2008 numbers, hitting .281 with 13 home runs in 158 games as the team's starting first baseman. On January 19, 2010, Loney agreed to a new 1-year contract that substantially increased his salary from $465,000 to $3.1 million. In 160 games in 2010, he hit 10 home runs and 88 RBI, while batting .268, his poorest stats since he joined the team.

On September 16, 2011, Loney hit a three-run pinch hit home run in his only plate appearance and the following day hit another three-run homer. He set a career high with five hits on September 18, helping the Dodgers win three straight games against the Pittsburgh Pirates. Loney finished the season by hitting .288 with 12 home runs, though his RBI total of 65 was the lowest since his rookie season.

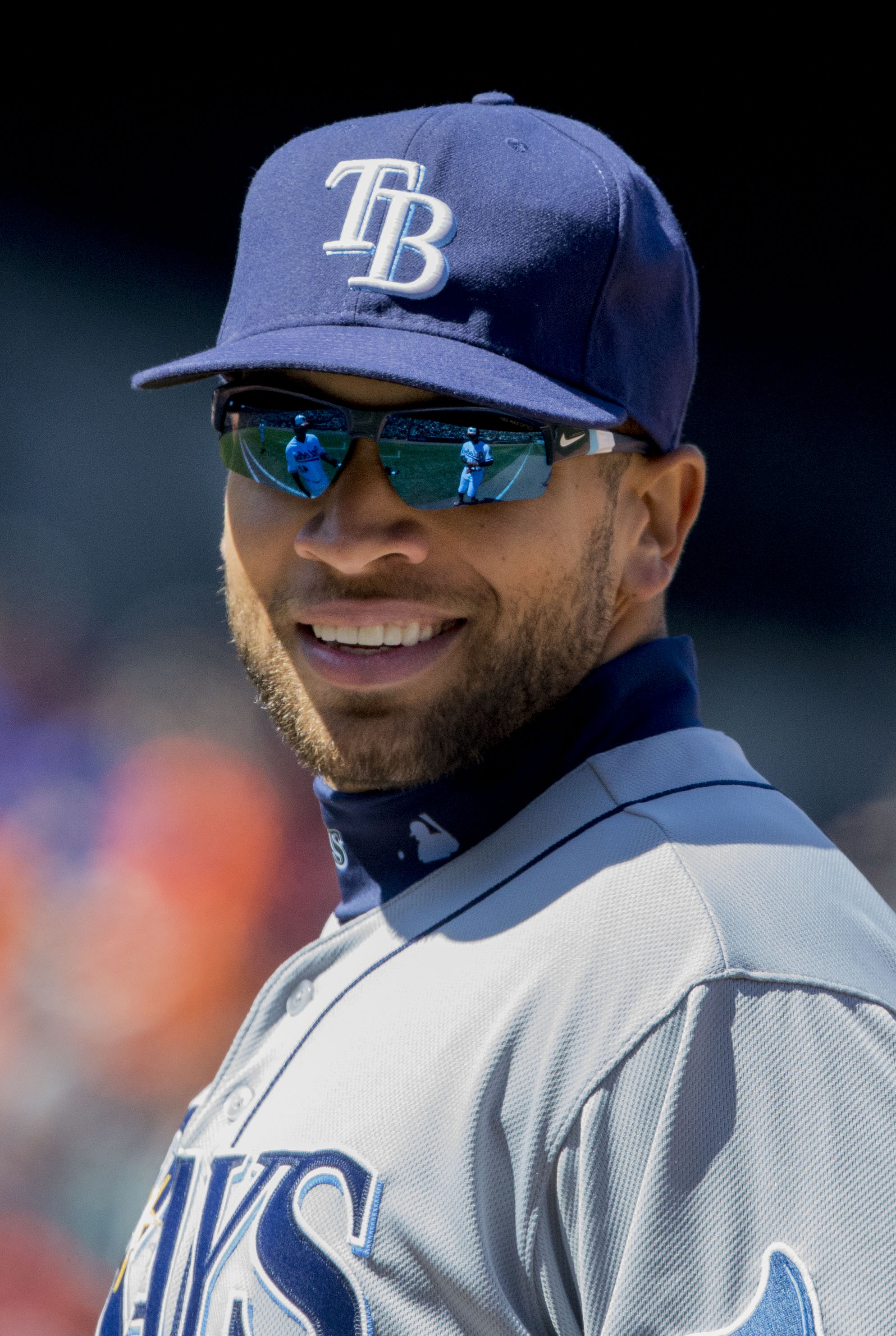
Loney with the Rays in 2014.

In 2012, Loney continued his downward career slide, hitting .254 with only 4 homers and 33 RBI in 114 games with the Dodgers. Around mid-season he started platooning at first base with Juan Rivera.

=== Boston Red Sox ===
On August 25, 2012, he was traded to the Boston Red Sox (along with Iván DeJesús, Jr., Allen Webster, Jerry Sands and Rubby De La Rosa) for Adrián González, Josh Beckett, Carl Crawford and Nick Punto and $11 million in cash. He played in 30 games with the Red Sox and hit .240.

=== Tampa Bay Rays ===
On December 6, 2012, Loney finalized a one-year $2 million deal with the Tampa Bay Rays. On July 23, 2013, Loney collected his 1,000th career hit in a game versus his former team, the Boston Red Sox. The contract wound up being a good deal for Loney and the Rays, as he hit .299 with 13 home runs and 75 RBIs, his best numbers since his rookie season in 2007. On December 13, 2013, Loney and the Rays agreed to a three-year contract worth $21 million. His numbers dipped a bit in 2014, as he hit .290 with 9 home runs and 69 RBIs, but he had 600 at-bats in a season for the first time in his career.

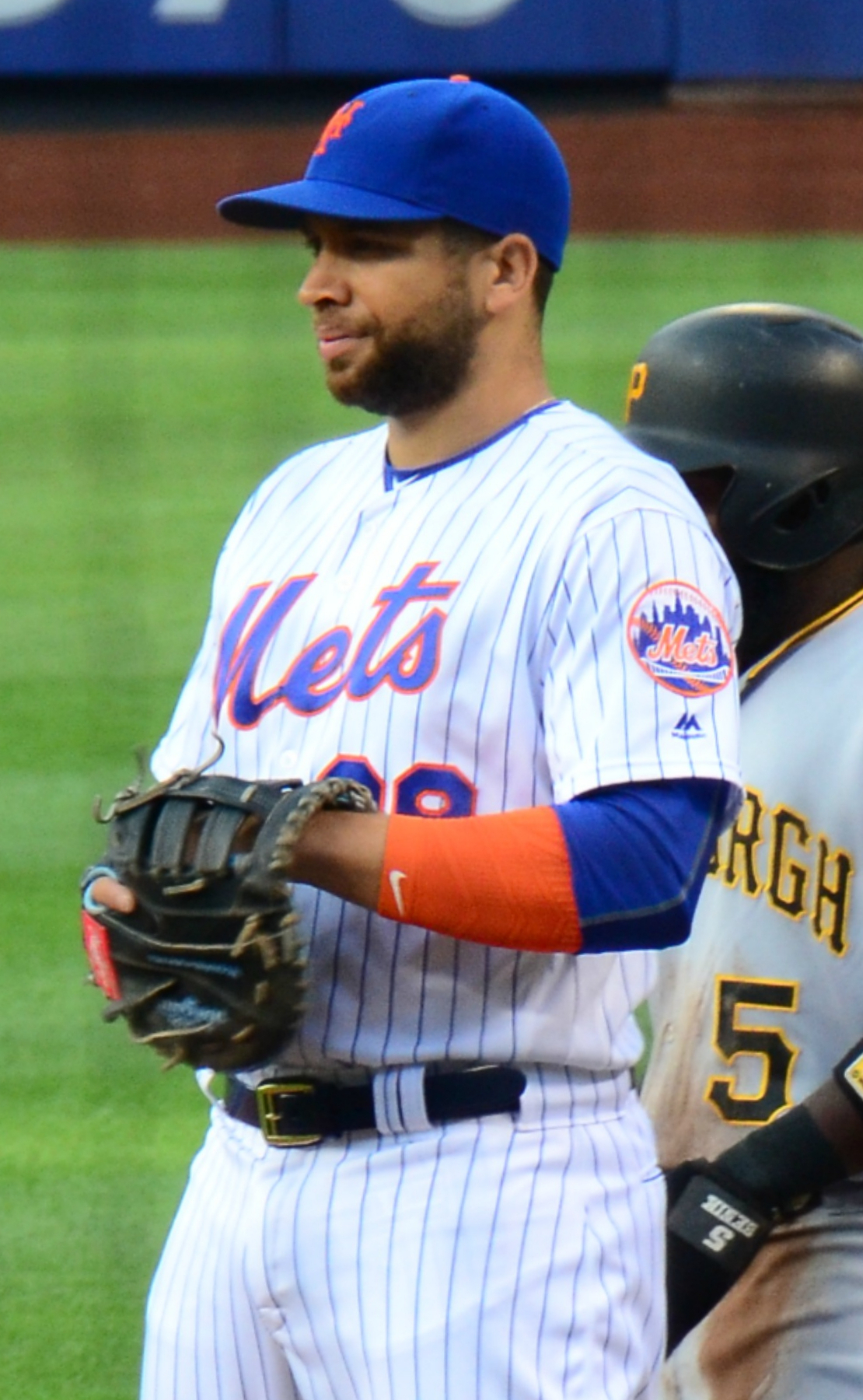
Loney with the Mets in 2016

Loney was limited to 104 games in 2015 because of injuries. He only slashed .280/.322/.357 for his lowest OPS since 2012, in addition to a drop in defensive value to a −5.4 UZR/150 at first base. On March 30, 2016, Loney was informed that he would not be listed on the Rays Opening Day roster. On April 3, the Rays released Loney, eating the entirety of the $8 million owed to him for the 2016 season.

=== San Diego Padres ===
On April 7, 2016, Loney signed a minor league deal with the San Diego Padres. He played in 43 games for the AAA El Paso Chihuahuas, including one appearance as a relief pitcher.

=== New York Mets ===
On May 28, 2016, Loney was traded to the New York Mets for cash considerations. Loney played in 100 games with the Mets, making 88 starts. He became a free agent at the end of the season.

=== Texas Rangers ===
On January 24, 2017, Loney signed a minor league contract with the Texas Rangers that included an invitation to spring training. The Rangers released Loney on March 27, 2017.

=== Detroit Tigers ===
On April 12, 2017, Loney signed a minor league contract with the Detroit Tigers. He was released by Detroit on May 7, 2017, after batting .229 in 16 games with the Toledo Mud Hens, Detroit's AAA affiliate.

=== Atlanta Braves ===
The Braves signed Loney to a minor league deal on May 18, 2017. Loney was released on May 22, 2017, following the Braves acquisition of first-baseman Matt Adams from the St. Louis Cardinals

=== LG Twins ===
Loney signed with the LG Twins of the KBO League for a $350,000 contract on July 18, 2017. After playing in 23 games, the Twins demoted Loney to the minor league. He opted to leave South Korea and return to the United States rather than report.

=== Sugar Land Skeeters ===
On February 5, 2019, Loney signed with the Sugar Land Skeeters of the Atlantic League of Professional Baseball. He was announced as an infielder, pitcher, and player-coach for the team. However, just 11 games into the season on May 7, Loney announced his retirement from professional baseball. In 11 games he hit .278/.357/.333 with 0 home runs and 3 RBIs. In 1 game 1 innings of relief he gave up 2 hits 1 earned run (9.00 ERA) with 1 strikeout.

== Personal life ==
He married his ex-wife Nadia, an Iranian American, in 2013 and they have two sons.
