= 2007 San Diego Padres season =

2007 San Diego Padres
- League: National League
- Division: West
- Ballpark: Petco Park
- City: San Diego, California
- Record: 89–74 (.546)
- Divisional place: 3rd
- Owners: John Moores
- General managers: Kevin Towers
- Managers: Bud Black
- Television: 4SD; Matt Vasgersian, Mark Grant, Tony Gwynn; Cablemas (Spanish)
- Radio: XX Sports Radio; Ted Leitner, Jerry Coleman, Andy Masur; XEMO-AM (Spanish)

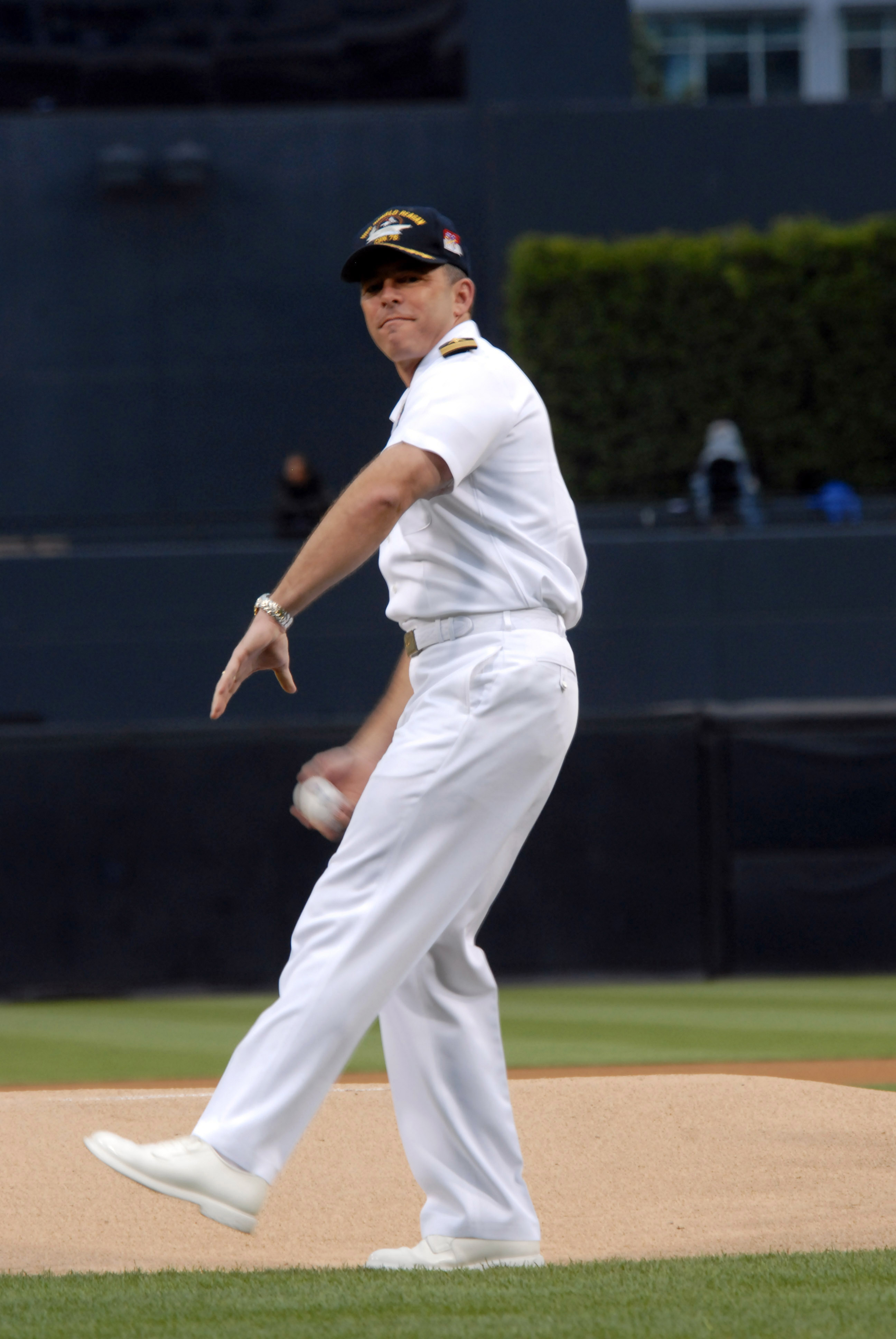
Terry B. Kraft, commanding officer of USS Ronald Reagan, throws out the ceremonial first pitch prior to a 2007 game honoring the ship.

The 2007 San Diego Padres season was the 39th season in franchise history. It began with the Padres' attempt to win a third consecutive National League West title. After finishing the regular season with 89 wins and 73 losses, they were in a tie with the Colorado Rockies for both the NL wild card and second place in the NL West, they were defeated in a tie-breaker which placed them third overall in the division and out of playoff competition.

The 2007 Padres 9.6% defensive caught stealing percentage is the lowest by a team in MLB history.

== Offseason ==
- November 8, 2006: Kevin Kouzmanoff was traded by the Cleveland Indians with Andrew Brown to the San Diego Padres for Josh Barfield.
- December 20, 2006: Marcus Giles was signed as a free agent with the San Diego Padres.
- January 3, 2007: Pete LaForest was signed as a free agent with the San Diego Padres.

== Regular season ==
=== Season standings ===
==== National League West ====
NL West
Team	W	L	Pct.	GB	Home	Road
Arizona Diamondbacks	90	72	.556	—	50‍–‍31	40‍–‍41
Colorado Rockies	90	73	.552	½	51‍–‍31	39‍–‍42
San Diego Padres	89	74	.546	1½	47‍–‍34	42‍–‍40
Los Angeles Dodgers	82	80	.506	8	43‍–‍38	39‍–‍42
San Francisco Giants	71	91	.438	19	39‍–‍42	32‍–‍49

==== Record vs. opponents ====
2007 National League record Source: MLB Standings Grid – 2007
Team	AZ	ATL	CHC	CIN	COL	FLA	HOU	LAD	MIL	NYM	PHI	PIT	SD	SF	STL	WAS	AL
Arizona	—	4–2	4–2	2–4	8–10	6–1	5–2	8–10	2–5	3–4	5–1	5–4	10–8	10–8	4–3	6–1	8–7
Atlanta	2–4	—	5–4	1–6	4–2	10–8	3–3	4–3	5–2	9–9	9–9	5–1	5–2	4–3	3–4	11–7	4–11
Chicago	2–4	4–5	—	9–9	5–2	0–6	8–7	2–5	9–6	2–5	3–4	8–7	3–5	5–2	11–5	6–1	8–4
Cincinnati	4–2	6–1	9–9	—	2–4	4–3	4–11	2–4	8–7	2–5	2–4	9–7	2–4	4–3	6–9	1–6	7-11
Colorado	10–8	2–4	2–5	4–2	—	3–3	3–4	12–6	4–2	4–2	4–3	4–3	11–8	10–8	3–4	4–3	10–8
Florida	1–6	8–10	6–0	3–4	3–3	—	2–3	4–3	2–5	7–11	9–9	3–4	3–4	1–6	2–4	8–10	9–9
Houston	2–5	3–3	7–8	11–4	4–3	3-2	—	4–3	5–13	2–5	3–3	5–10	4–3	2–4	7–9	2–5	9–9
Los Angeles	10–8	3–4	5–2	4–2	6–12	3–4	3–4	—	3–3	5–5	4–2	5–2	8–10	10–8	3–3	5–1	5–10
Milwaukee	5–2	2–5	6–9	7–8	2–4	5–2	13–5	3–3	—	2–4	3–4	10–6	2–5	4–5	7–8	4–2	8–7
New York	4–3	9–9	5–2	5–2	2–4	11–7	5–2	5–5	4–2	—	6–12	4–2	2–4	4–2	5–2	9–9	8–7
Philadelphia	1-5	9–9	4–3	4–2	3–4	9–9	3–3	2–4	4–3	12–6	—	4–2	4–3	4–4	6–3	12–6	8–7
Pittsburgh	4–5	1–5	7–8	7–9	3–4	4–3	10–5	2–5	6–10	2–4	2–4	—	1–6	4–2	6–12	4–2	5–10
San Diego	8–10	2–5	5–3	4–2	8–11	4–3	3–4	10–8	5–2	4–2	3–4	6–1	—	14–4	3–4	4–2	6–9
San Francisco	8–10	3–4	2–5	3–4	8–10	6–1	4–2	8–10	5–4	2–4	4–4	2–4	4–14	—	4–1	3–4	5–10
St. Louis	3–4	4–3	5–11	9–6	4–3	4-2	9–7	3–3	8–7	2–5	3–6	12–6	4–3	1–4	—	1–5	6–9
Washington	1–6	7–11	1–6	6–1	3–4	10-8	5–2	1–5	2–4	9–9	6–12	2–4	2–4	4–3	5–1	—	9–9

=== Roster ===
2007 San Diego Padres
Roster
Pitchers: 21,42 Heath Bell; 26 Doug Brocail; 41 Kevin Cameron; 40 Jack Cassel; 57 Justin Germano; 45 Justin Hampson; 52 Clay Hensley; 51 Trevor Hoffman; 49 Wilfredo Ledezma; 38 Scott Linebrink; 30 Greg Maddux; 43 Cla Meredith; 44 Jake Peavy; 57,77 Aaron Rakers; 40 Royce Ring; 54 Tim Stauffer; 50 Joe Thatcher; 39 Mike Thompson; 33 Brett Tomko; 33 David Wells; 32 Chris Young	Catchers: 28 Josh Bard; 4 Michael Barrett; 14 Rob Bowen; 53 Pete Laforest; Infielders: 27 Geoff Blum; 34 Russell Branyan; 2 Morgan Ensberg; 22 Marcus Giles; 23 Adrián González; 3 Khalil Greene; 16 Chase Headley; 5 Kevin Kouzmanoff; 13 Óscar Robles; 11 Craig Stansberry	Outfielders: 7 Hiram Bocachica; 15 Milton Bradley; 25,42 Mike Cameron; 12 Brady Clark; 9 José Cruz Jr.; 24 Brian Giles; 14 Scott Hairston; 7 Jason Lane; 10 Rob Mackowiak; 18 Paul McAnulty; 8 Terrmel Sledge; Other batters: 1 Drew Macias; 26 Colt Morton; 9 Brian Myrow	Manager: 20 Bud Black; Coaches: 48 Darrel Akerfelds (bullpen); 36 Darren Balsley (pitching); 16 Craig Colbert (bench); 47 Glenn Hoffman (third base); 29 Wally Joyner (hitting); 17 Bobby Meacham (first base); 11 Merv Rettenmund (hitting)

== Player stats ==
Note: Team batting and pitching leaders are in bold.

=== Batting ===
==== Starters by position ====
Note: Pos = Position; G = Games played; AB = At bats; H = Hits; Avg. = Batting average; HR = Home runs; RBI = Runs batted in

Pos	Player	G	AB	H	Avg.	HR	RBI
C	Josh Bard	118	389	111	.285	5	51
1B	Adrián González	**161**	**646**	**182**	**.282**	**30**	**100**
2B	Marcus Giles	116	420	96	.229	4	39
SS	Khalil Greene	153	611	155	.254	27	97
3B	Kevin Kouzmanoff	145	484	133	.275	18	74
LF	Termel Sledge	100	200	42	.210	7	23
CF	Mike Cameron	151	571	138	.242	21	78
RF	Brian Giles	121	483	131	.271	13	51

==== Other batters ====
Note: G = Games played; AB = At bats; H = Hits; Avg. = Batting average; HR = Home runs; RBI = Runs batted in

Player	G	AB	H	Avg.	HR	RBI
Geoff Blum	122	330	83	.252	5	33
José Cruz Jr.	91	256	60	.234	6	21
Milton Bradley	42	144	45	.313	11	30
Michael Barrett	44	133	30	.226	0	12
Russell Branyan	61	122	24	.197	7	19
Scott Hairston	31	87	25	.287	8	20
Rob Bowen	30	82	22	.268	2	11
Hiram Bocachica	27	63	15	.238	1	2
Morgan Ensberg	30	58	13	.224	4	8
Rob Mackowiak	28	56	11	.196	0	2
Brady Clark	21	49	15	.306	0	6
Paul McAnulty	20	40	8	.200	1	5
Oscar Robles	24	26	6	.231	0	2
Pete LaForest	10	25	9	.360	1	3
Chase Headley	8	18	4	.222	0	0
Brian Myrow	12	10	1	.100	0	1
Craig Stansberry	11	7	2	.286	0	1
Jason Lane	3	2	0	.000	0	0
Colt Morton	1	1	0	.000	0	0
Drew Macias	1	0	0	----	0	0

=== Pitching ===
==== Starting pitchers ====
Note: G = Games pitched; IP = Innings pitched; W = Wins; L = Losses; ERA = Earned run average; SO = Strikeouts

Player	G	IP	W	L	ERA	SO
Jake Peavy	34	**223.1**	**19**	6	**2.54**	**240**
Greg Maddux	34	198.0	14	**11**	4.14	104
Chris Young	30	173.0	9	8	3.12	167
Justin Germano	26	133.1	7	10	4.46	78
David Wells	22	118.2	5	8	5.54	63
Tim Stauffer	2	7.2	0	1	21.13	6

==== Other pitchers ====
Note: G = Games pitched; IP = Innings pitched; W = Wins; L = Losses; ERA = Earned run average; SO = Strikeouts

Player	G	IP	W	L	ERA	SO
Clay Hensley	13	50.0	2	3	6.84	30
Brett Tomko	7	27.1	2	1	4.61	26
Jack Cassel	6	22.2	1	1	3.97	11

==== Relief pitchers ====
Note: G = Games pitched; W = Wins; L = Losses; SV = Saves; ERA = Earned run average; SO = Strikeouts

Player	G	W	L	SV	ERA	SO
Trevor Hoffman	61	4	5	**42**	2.98	44
Heath Bell	**81**	6	4	2	2.02	102
Cla Meredith	80	5	6	0	3.50	59
Doug Brocail	67	5	1	0	3.05	43
Kevin Cameron	48	2	0	0	2.79	50
Scott Linebrink	44	3	3	1	3.80	25
Justin Hampson	39	2	3	0	2.70	34
Joe Thatcher	22	2	2	0	1.29	16
Royce Ring	15	1	0	0	3.60	17
Wil Ledezma	9	0	0	0	6.28	16
Mike Thompson	7	0	1	0	6.89	5
Aaron Rakers	1	0	0	0	0.00	0

== Wild Card tie-breaker ==
The Padres ended tied with the Colorado Rockies for both second place in the NL West as well as the National League Wild Card. A tie-breaker was played on October 1, 2007 in Denver to determine which team would continue on to post-season play. The game lasted 13 innings through four hours and 40 minutes. The Rockies won the Wild Card spot with a final score of 9 to 8, and the Padres' season was over.

== Transactions ==
September 4, 2007: Pete LaForest was selected off waivers by the Philadelphia Phillies from the San Diego Padres.

=== Game log ===
2007 game log
April

#	Date	Opponent	Score	Win	Loss	Save	Attendance	Record
1	April 3	@ Giants	7–0	Peavy (1-0)	Zito (0-1)		42,773	1-0
2	April 4	@ Giants	5–3	Meredith (1-0)	Hennessey (0-1)	Hoffman (1)	39,938	2-0
3	April 5	@ Giants	5–3	Morris (1-0)	Hensley (0-1)	Benítez (1)	37,914	2-1
4	April 6	Rockies	4–3	Hirsh (1-0)	Maddux (0-1)	Fuentes (1)	44,267	2-2
5	April 7	Rockies	3–2	Hoffman (1-0)	Corpas (0-1)		40,504	3-2
6	April 8	Rockies	2–1 (10)	Linebrink (1-0)	Hawkins (0-2)		27,086	4-2
7	April 9	Giants	1–0	Young (1-0)	Cain (0-1)	Hoffman (2)	31,388	5-2
8	April 10	Giants	6–5	Morris (2-0)	Hensley (0-2)	Benítez (2)	28,878	5-3
9	April 11	Giants	4–0	Maddux (1-1)	Lowry (0-2)		31,568	6-3
10	April 13	@ Dodgers	9–1	Lowe (2-1)	Wells (0-1)		49,090	6-4
11	April 14	@ Dodgers	7–2	Peavy (2-0)	Schmidt (1-2)		55,942	7-4
12	April 15	@ Dodgers	9–3	Wolf (2-1)	Young (1-1)		55,298	7-5
13	April 16	@ Cubs	12–4	Marquis (1-1)	Hensley (0-3)		32,126	7-6
14	April 17	@ Cubs	4–3 (14)	Brocail (1-0)	Ohman (0-1)	Hoffman (3)	36,021	8-6
15	April 18	D-backs	5–2 (12)	Peña (1-1)	Thompson (0-1)	Valverde (7)	26,872	8-7
16	April 19	D-backs	11–6	Peavy (3-0)	Hernández (1-1)		32,224	9-7
17	April 20	@ Rockies	11–1	Young (2-1)	Fogg (0-1)		22,338	10-7
18	April 21	@ Rockies	7–3	Hensley (1-3)	Francis (1-2)		22,795	11-7
19	April 22	@ Rockies	4–2	Hirsh (2-1)	Maddux (1-2)	Fuentes (4)	25,746	11-8
20	April 24	@ D-backs	10–5	Wells (1-1)	Johnson (0-1)	Hoffman (4)	19,508	12-8
21	April 25	@ D-backs	3–2	Peña (2-1)	Hoffman (1-1)		18,307	12-9
22	April 26	@ D-backs	7–4	Hernández (2-1)	Young (2-2)	Valverde (8)	16,792	12-10
23	April 27	Dodgers	6–5	Seánez (1-0)	Hoffman (1-2)	Saito (7)	44,035	12-11
24	April 28	Dodgers	3–2	Maddux (2-2)	Tomko (0-2)	Hoffman (5)	42,385	13-11
25	April 29	Dodgers	5–4 (17)	Billingsley (1-0)	Hampson (0-1)		44,028	13-12
26	April 30	Nationals	3–2	Patterson (1-4)	Peavy (3-1)	Cordero (4)	19,769	13-13

May

#	Date	Opponent	Score	Win	Loss	Save	Attendance	Record
27	May 1	Nationals	3–0	Young (3-2)	Hill (2-3)	Hoffman (6)	19,438	14-13
28	May 2	Nationals	7–3	Brocail (2-0)	Chico (2-3)		22,153	15-13
29	May 4	@ Marlins	5–4	Tankersley (1-0)	Linebrink (1-1)	Owens (4)	24,691	15-14
30	May 5	@ Marlins	7–6 (12)	Hampson (1-1)	Gardner (0-2)	Hoffman (7)	21,381	16-14
31	May 6	@ Marlins	3–1	Peavy (4-1)	Olsen (3-2)	Hoffman (8)	15,310	17-14
32	May 7	@ Braves	4–2	Young (4-2)	James (3-3)	Hoffman (9)	19,189	18-14
33	May 8	@ Braves	3–2	González (2-0)	Bell (0-1)	Soriano (3)	21,748	18-15
34	May 9	@ Braves	3–2	Smoltz (5-1)	Meredith (1-1)	Soriano (4)	36,523	18-16
35	May 10	@ Braves	5–3	Hudson (4-1)	Wells (1-2)	Soriano (5)	28,799	18-17
36	May 11	Cardinals	7–0	Peavy (5-1)	Wells (1-7)		38,901	19-17
37	May 12	Cardinals	5–0	Looper (5-2)	Young (4-3)		44,082	19-18
38	May 13	Cardinals	3–0	Germano (1-0)	Reyes (0-6)	Hoffman (10)	36,616	20-18
39	May 14	Reds	7–1	Maddux (3-2)	Belisle (3-3)		20,262	21-18
40	May 15	Reds	2–1 (12)	Weathers (1-2)	Bell (0-2)		26,694	21-19
41	May 16	Reds	3–2	Hoffman (2-2)	Arroyo (2-4)		23,856	22-19
42	May 18	@ Mariners	8–1	Young (5-3)	Batista (3-4)		39,531	23-19
43	May 19	@ Mariners	7–4	Ramírez (4-2)	Maddux (3-3)	Putz (10)	34,287	23-20
44	May 20	@ Mariners	2–1	Germano (2-0)	Hernández (2-2)	Hoffman (11)	38,844	24-20
45	May 22	Cubs	5–1	Peavy (6-1)	Hill (4-4)	Hoffman (12)	26,192	25-20
46	May 23	Cubs	2–1	Wells (2-2)	Marshall (0-1)	Hoffman (13)	27,535	26-20
47	May 24	Cubs	3–1	Howry (2-3)	Meredith (1-2)	Dempster (10)	32,258	26-21
48	May 25	Brewers	8–6	Maddux (4-3)	Bush (3-5)	Linebrink (1)	32,130	27-21
49	May 26	Brewers	6–3	Germano (3-0)	Vargas (3-1)	Hoffman (14)	35,975	28-21
50	May 27	Brewers	3–0	Peavy (7-1)	Suppan (6-5)	Hoffman (15)	41,246	29-21
51	May 29	@ Pirates	4–1	Gorzelanny (6-3)	Wells (2-3)	Torres (12)	15,794	29-22
52	May 30	@ Pirates	9–0	Young (6-3)	Maholm (2-7)		12,734	30-22
53	May 31	@ Pirates	4–2 (11)	Meredith (3-2)	Sharpless (0-1)	Hoffman (16)	14,966	31-22

June

#	Date	Opponent	Score	Win	Loss	Save	Attendance	Record
54	June 1	@ Nationals	4–3 (10)	Rauch (3-1)	Meredith (2-3)		22,354	31-23
55	June 2	@ Nationals	11–3	Germano (4-0)	Speigner (1-2)		21,635	32-23
56	June 3	@ Nationals	7–3	Wells (3-3)	Simontacchi (2-4)		26,967	33-23
57	June 5	Dodgers	1–0	Linebrink (2-1)	Seánez (2-1)	Hoffman (17)	31,703	34-23
58	June 6	Dodgers	5–2	Maddux (5-3)	Wolf (7-4)	Hoffman (18)	31,541	35-23
59	June 7	Dodgers	6–5	Hampson (2-1)	Broxton (2-2)		40,631	36-23
60	June 8	Mariners	6–5 (11)	O'Flaherty (2-0)	Meredith (2-4)	Putz (16)	44,325	36-24
61	June 9	Mariners	6–5	Green (1-1)	Brocail (2-1)	Putz (17)	37,178	36-25
62	June 10	Mariners	4–3	Batista (7-4)	Hoffman (2-3)	Putz (18)	35,950	36-26
63	June 12	@ Devil Rays	11–4	Fossum (4-6)	Meredith (2-5)		12,870	36-27
64	June 13	@ Devil Rays	9–0	Peavy (8-1)	Jackson (0-8)		12,020	37-27
65	June 14	@ Devil Rays	7–1	Germano (5-0)	Howell (1-1)		19,270	38-27
66	June 15	@ Cubs	4–1	Lilly (5-4)	Wells (3-4)	Dempster (15)	40,479	38-28
67	June 16	@ Cubs	1–0	Bell (1-2)	Zambrano (7-6)	Hoffman (19)	41,632	39-28
68	June 17	@ Cubs	11–3	Maddux (6-4)	Hill (5-5)		40,964	40-28
69	June 19	Orioles	12–6	Peavy (9-1)	Trachsel (5-5)		38,181	41-28
70	June 20	Orioles	7–1	Guthrie (4-1)	Germano (5-1)		26,931	41-29
71	June 21	Orioles	6–3	Bédard (5-4)	Wells (3-5)		40,680	41-30
72	June 22	Red Sox	2–1	Matsuzaka (9-5)	Maddux (6-4)	Papelbon (17)	44,405	41-31
73	June 23	Red Sox	6–1	Young (7-3)	Wakefield (7-8)		44,457	42-31
74	June 24	Red Sox	4–2	Beckett (11-1)	Peavy (9-2)	Papelbon (18)	44,449	42-32
75	June 25	@ Giants	4–3 (11)	Chulk (3-2)	Hampson (2-2)		41,140	42-33
76	June 26	@ Giants	3–2 (10)	Meredith (3-5)	Messenger (1-2)	Hoffman (20)	41,329	43-33
77	June 27	@ Giants	4–2	Maddux (7-4)	Cain (2-9)	Hoffman (21)	42,527	44-33
78	June 29	@ Dodgers	7–6	Young (8-3)	Kuo (1-4)	Hoffman (22)	52,050	45-33
79	June 30	@ Dodgers	3–1 (12)	Ring (1-0)	Tomko (1-6)	Hoffman (23)	53,769	46-33

July

#	Date	Opponent	Score	Win	Loss	Save	Attendance	Record
80	July 1	@ Dodgers	5–0	Billingsley (5-0)	Germano (5-2)		48,632	46-34
81	July 2	Marlins	3–1	Wells (4-5)	Mitre (2-4)	Hoffman (24)	25,857	47-34
82	July 3	Marlins	6–4	Miller (3-0)	Maddux (7-5)	Gregg (16)	34,488	47-35
83	July 4	Marlins	1–0	Bell (2-2)	Lindstrom (1-3)		27,491	48-35
84	July 5	Marlins	3–2	Kim (4-4)	Peavy (9-3)	Gregg (17)	32,496	48-36
85	July 6	Braves	7–4	Carlyle (3-2)	Germano (5-3)		37,526	48-37
86	July 7	Braves	8–5	Bell (3-2)	Yates (2-1)	Hoffman (25)	41,419	49-37
87	July 8	Braves	5–4	Davies (4-7)	Maddux (7-6)		41,026	49-38
88	July 13	@ D-backs	8–3	Davis (6-10)	Maddux (7-7)		30,981	49-39
89	July 14	@ D-backs	5–4	Lyon (6-3)	Linebrink (2-2)	Valverde (27)	36,833	49-40
90	July 15	@ D-backs	4–0	Germano (6-3)	Webb (8-7)		30,343	50-40
91	July 16	Mets	5–1	Wells (5-5)	Sosa (7-4)		35,802	51-40
92	July 17	Mets	7–0	Hernández (6-4)	Peavy (9-4)		31,660	51-41
93	July 18	Mets	5–4	Linebrink (3-2)	Smith (2-1)	Hoffman (26)	32,524	52-41
94	July 19	Phillies	1–0	Young (9-3)	Hamels (11-5)	Hoffman (27)	30,885	53-41
95	July 20	Phillies	7–3	Eaton (9-6)	Germano (6-4)	Alfonseca (7)	36,113	53-42
96	July 21	Phillies	12–4	Moyer (8-8)	Wells (5-6)		40,917	53-43
97	July 22	Phillies	9–0	Durbin (2-2)	Peavy (9-5)		37,986	53-44
98	July 23	@ Rockies	7–5	Buchholz (5-3)	Linebrink (3-3)	Corpas (5)	31,047	53-45
99	July 24	@ Rockies	5–3	Bell (4-2)	Ramírez (2-2)	Hoffman (28)	37,127	54-45
100	July 25	@ Rockies	10–2	Cook (7-6)	Germano (6-5)		28,162	54-46
101	July 26	@ Astros	7–1	Rodríguez (7-9)	Wells (5-7)		33,718	54-47
102	July 27	@ Astros	9–4	Peavy (10-5)	Williams (5-12)		39,996	55-47
103	July 28	@ Astros	3–1	Oswalt (10-6)	Maddux (7-8)	Lidge (6)	42,651	55-48
104	July 29	@ Astros	18–11	Brocail (3-1)	Jennings (2-7)		39,350	56-48
105	July 31	D-backs	4–0	Webb (10-8)	Germano (6-6)		32,086	56-49

August

#	Date	Opponent	Score	Win	Loss	Save	Attendance	Record
106	August 1	D-backs	9–5 (11)	Valverde (1-3)	Bell (4-3)		30,416	56-50
107	August 2	D-backs	11–0	Peavy (11-5)	Petit (2-3)		37,119	57-50
108	August 3	Giants	4–3 (10)	Bell (5-3)	Taschner (2-1)		43,523	58-50
109	August 4	Giants	3–2 (12)	Meredith (4-5)	Messenger (1-4)		42,497	59-50
110	August 5	Giants	5–4	Brocail (4-1)	Chulk (4-3)	Hoffman (29)	42,438	60-50
111	August 6	@ Cardinals	10–5	Looper (9-9)	Wells (5-8)		42,743	60-51
112	August 7	@ Cardinals	4–0	Peavy (12-5)	Reyes (1-11)		42,846	61-51
113	August 8	@ Cardinals	2–1	Wells (5-13)	Maddux (7-9)	Isringhausen (22)	42,138	61-52
114	August 9	@ Cardinals	5–0	Piñeiro (2-2)	Young (9-4)		42,848	61-53
115	August 10	@ Reds	12–7 (11)	Cameron (1-0)	Weathers (2-4)		21,594	62-53
116	August 11	@ Reds	8–3	Livingston (3-2)	Hampson (2-3)		27,381	62-54
117	August 12	@ Reds	10–4	Peavy (13-5)	Arroyo (5-13)		31,297	63-54
118	August 14	Rockies	8–0	Maddux (8-9)	Francis (13-6)		32,049	64-54
119	August 15	Rockies	3–0	Jiménez (2-2)	Meredith (4-6)	Corpas (10)	36,864	64-55
120	August 16	Rockies	11–9	Hensley (2-3)	Affeldt (4-3)	Hoffman (30)	28,198	65-55
121	August 17	Astros	3–1	Williams (7-12)	Bell (5-4)	Lidge (10)	32,063	65-56
122	August 18	Astros	3–2	Borkowski (3-3)	Germano (6-7)	Lidge (11)	44,272	65-57
123	August 19	Astros	5–3	Maddux (9-9)	Albers (3-6)	Hoffman (31)	37,628	66-57
124	August 21	@ Mets	7–6	Wagner (2-1)	Hoffman (2-4)		48,592	66-58
125	August 22	@ Mets	7–5	Peavy (14-5)	Lawrence (1-1)	Hoffman (32)	50,060	67-58
126	August 23	@ Mets	9–8 (10)	Hoffman (3-4)	Heilman (7-6)	Bell (1)	50,078	68-58
127	August 24	@ Phillies	14–3	Maddux (10-9)	Moyer (11-10)		39,023	69-58
128	August 25	@ Phillies	4–3	Bell (6-4)	Myers (2-5)	Hoffman (33)	37,957	70-58
129	August 26	@ Phillies	14–2	Kendrick (7-3)	Stauffer (0-1)	Ennis (1)	39,362	70-59
130	August 27	D-backs	3–1	Peavy (15-5)	Hernández (9-9)	Hoffman (34)	25,763	71-59
131	August 28	D-backs	6–4	Germano (7-7)	Webb (14-9)	Hoffman (35)	23,006	72-59
132	August 29	D-backs	3–1	Cameron (2-0)	Slaten (3-2)	Bell (2)	29,021	73-59
133	August 30	D-backs	8–7	Davis (12-11)	Young (9-5)	Valverde (41)	28,554	73-60
134	August 31	Dodgers	6–4	Brocail (5-1)	Seánez (6-3)	Hoffman (36)	44,324	74-60

September

#	Date	Opponent	Score	Win	Loss	Save	Attendance	Record
135	September 1	Dodgers	7–0	Peavy (16-5)	Lowe (11-12)		42,605	75-60
136	September 2	Dodgers	5–0	Billingsley (10-4)	Germano (7-8)		40,776	75-61
137	September 3	@ D-backs	10–2	Maddux (11-9)	Owings (6-8)		30,531	76-61
138	September 4	@ D-backs	9–1	Davis (13-11)	Young (9-6)		26,063	76-62
139	September 5	@ D-backs	9–6	Hernández (10-9)	Peavy (16-6)	Valverde (42)	28,065	76-63
140	September 7	@ Rockies	10–4	Herges (4-0)	Germano (7-9)		27,247	76-64
141	September 8	@ Rockies	3–1	Maddux (12-9)	Francis (15-7)	Hoffman (37)	30,429	77-64
142	September 9	@ Rockies	4–2	Fogg (9-9)	Young (9-7)	Corpas (14)	20,260	77-65
143	September 11	@ Dodgers	9–4	Peavy (17-6)	Loaiza (2-1)		51,620	78-65
144	September 12	@ Dodgers	6–1	Billingsley (11-4)	Germano (7-10)		43,699	78-66
145	September 13	@ Dodgers	6–3	Wells (8-8)	Maddux (12-10)	Saito (38)	44,496	78-67
146	September 14	Giants	5–4 (10)	Hoffman (4-4)	Giese (0-1)		32,053	79-67
147	September 15	Giants	6–0	Tomko (3-11)	Cain (7-15)		41,554	80-67
148	September 16	Giants	5–1	Peavy (18-6)	Lincecum (7-5)		34,000	81-67
149	September 17	Pirates	3–0	Cassel (1-0)	Van Benschoten (0-6)	Hoffman (38)	33,557	82-67
150	September 18	Pirates	5–3	Maddux (13-10)	Gorzelanny (14-8)	Hoffman (39)	30,629	83-67
151	September 19	Pirates	5–3	Meredith (5-6)	Capps (4-7)		26,354	84-67
152	September 20	Pirates	6–3	Tomko (4-11)	Morris (9-11)	Hoffman (40)	27,020	85-67
153	September 21	Rockies	2–1 (14)	Herges (5-1)	Thatcher (0-1)		31,288	85-68
154	September 22	Rockies	6–2	Speier (2-1)	Cassel (1-1)		35,020	85-69
155	September 23	Rockies	7–3	Francis (17-8)	Maddux (13-11)		37,984	85-70
156	September 24	@ Giants	9–4	Zito (10-13)	Young (9-8)		35,650	85-71
157	September 25	@ Giants	6–4	Thatcher (1-1)	Wilson (1-2)	Hoffman (41)	35,524	86-71
158	September 26	@ Giants	11–3	Peavy (19-6)	Misch (0-4)		42,926	87-71
159	September 27	@ Brewers	9–5	Thatcher (2-1)	Gallardo (9-5)		34,918	88-71
160	September 28	@ Brewers	6–3	Maddux (14-11)	Vargas (11-6)	Hoffman (42)	38,135	89-71
161	September 29	@ Brewers	4–3 (11)	Stetter (1-0)	Thatcher (2-2)		40,946	89-72
162	September 30	@ Brewers	11–6	Suppan (12-12)	Tomko (4-12)		42,415	89-73

October

#	Date	Opponent	Score	Win	Loss	Save	Attendance	Record
163	October 1	@ Rockies	9–8 (13)	Ortiz (5-4)	Hoffman (4-5)		48,404	89-74

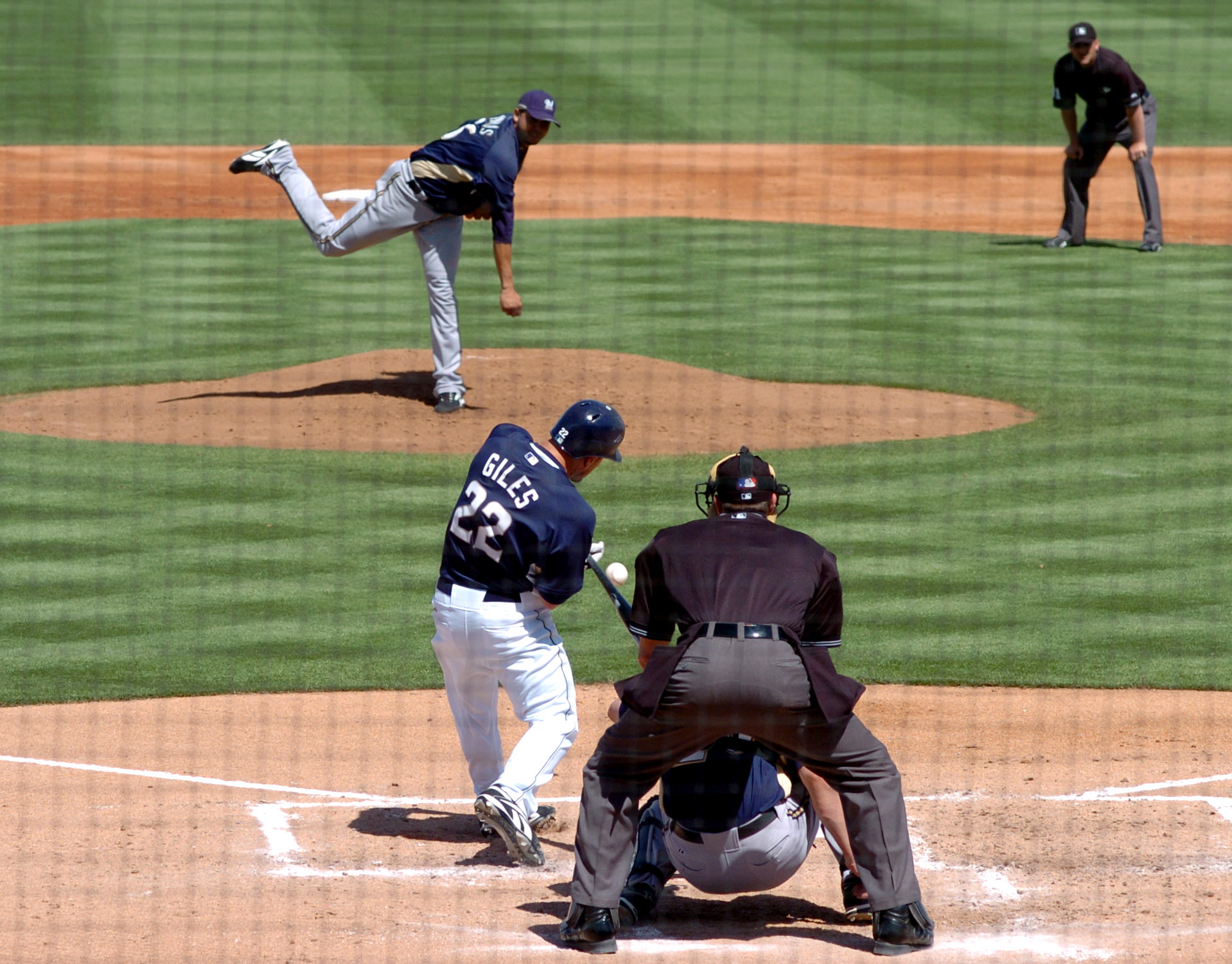
March 21 spring training game against the Milwaukee Brewers at the Peoria Sports Complex in Arizona.

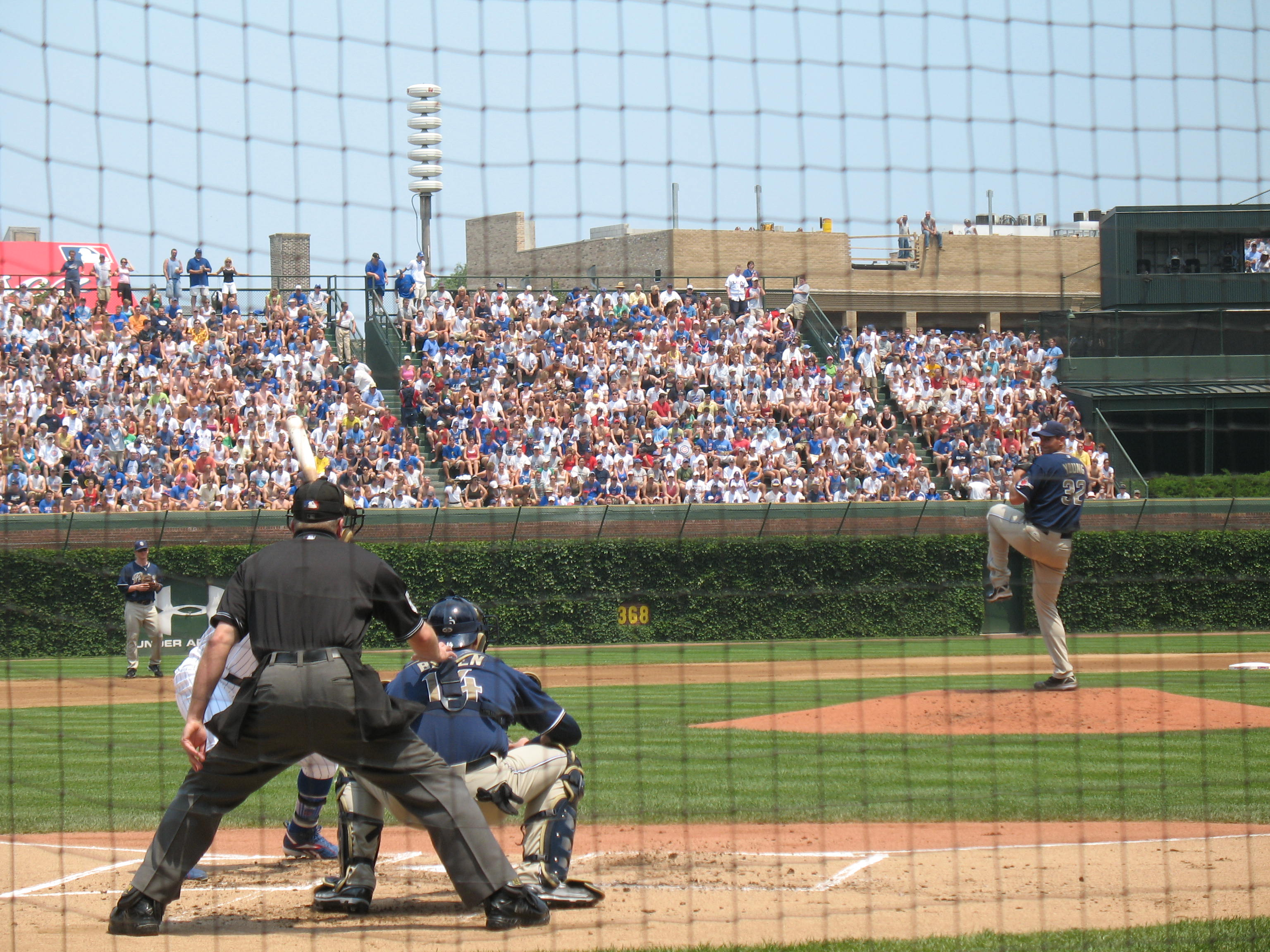
Chris Young pitching against the Cubs at Wrigley Field on June 16; he was working on a no-hitter but was later ejected from the game after he and Derrek Lee got into a fight that turned into a bench-clearing altercation.

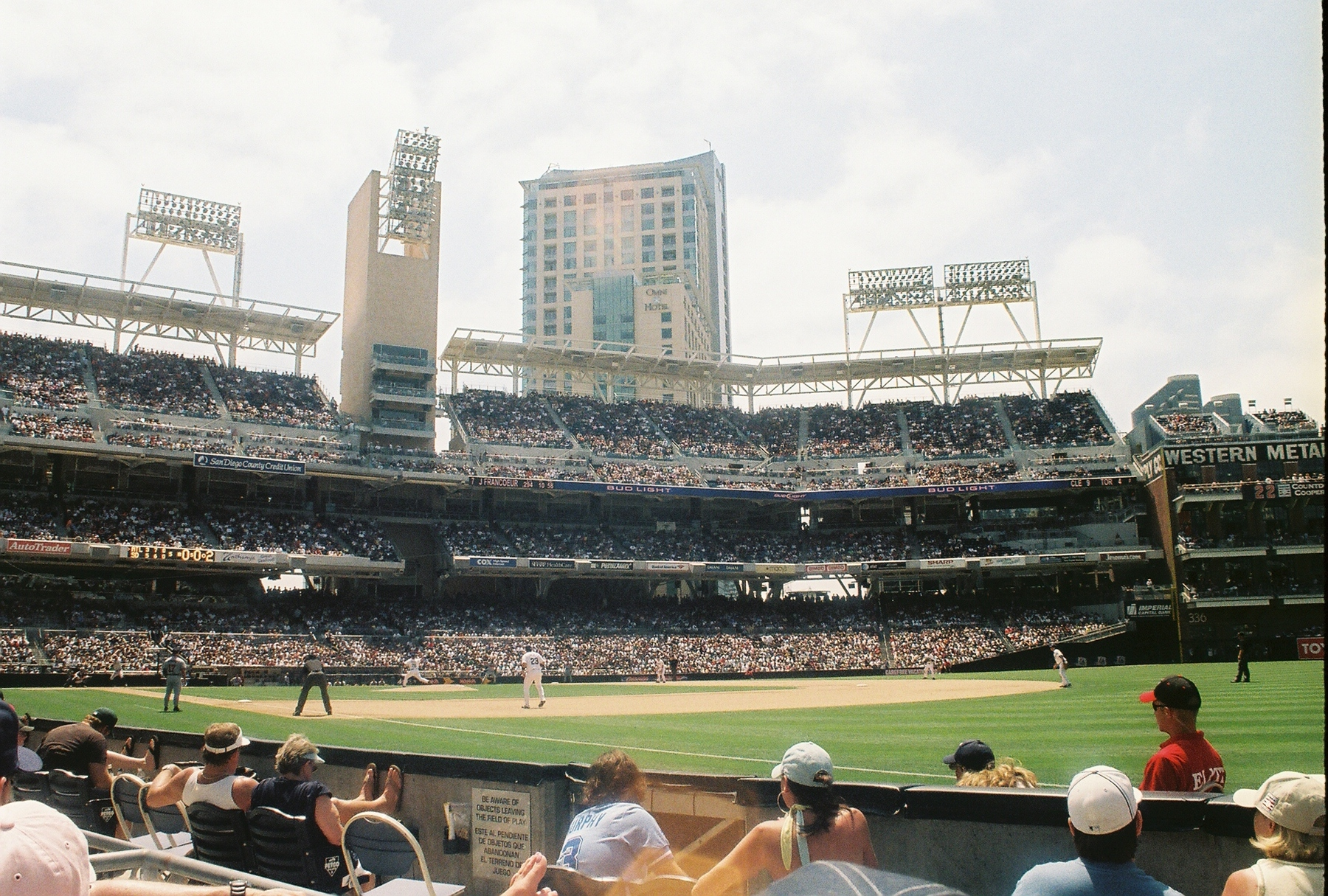
Doug Brocail of the Padres throws a pitch to Jeff Francoeur of the Braves on July 7 at Petco Park.

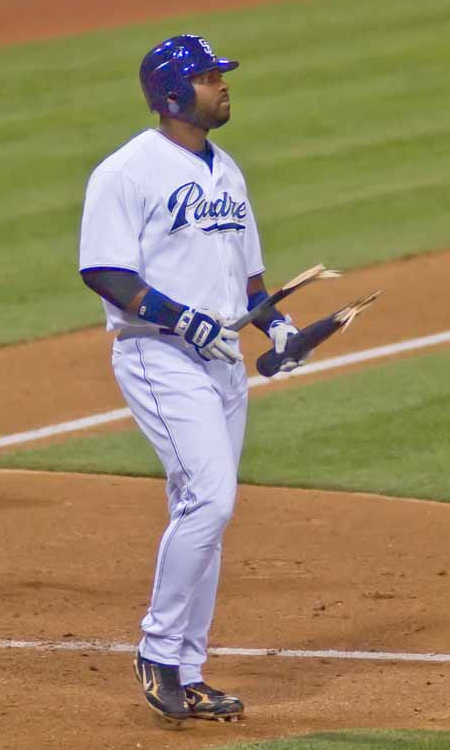
Milton Bradley on August 28, after striking out and deliberately breaking his bat.

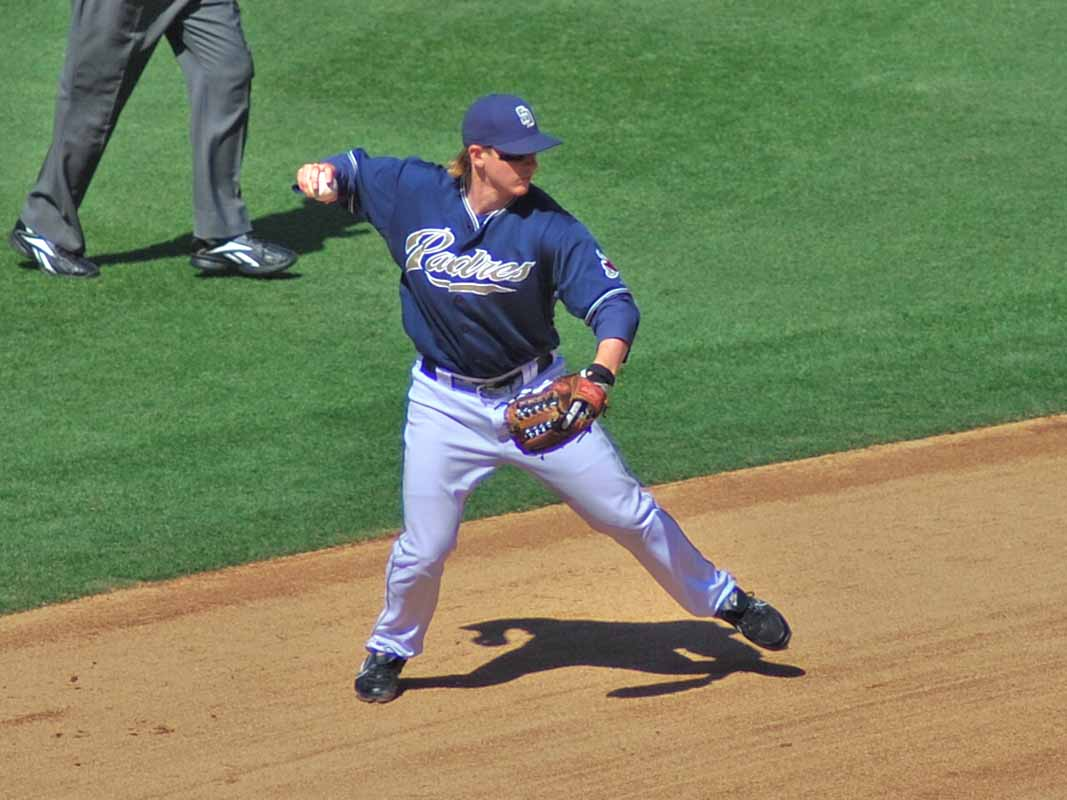
Khalil Greene on September 16, in a game against the Giants.

== Farm system ==
Level	Team	League	Manager
AAA	Portland Beavers	Pacific Coast League	Rick Renteria
AA	San Antonio Missions	Texas League	Randy Ready
A	Lake Elsinore Storm	California League	Carlos Lezcano
A	Fort Wayne Wizards	Midwest League	Doug Dascenzo
A-Short Season	Eugene Emeralds	Northwest League	Greg Riddoch
Rookie	AZL Padres	Arizona League	Tony Muser

LEAGUE CHAMPIONS: San Antonio
