= Darren Balsley =

Baseball coach

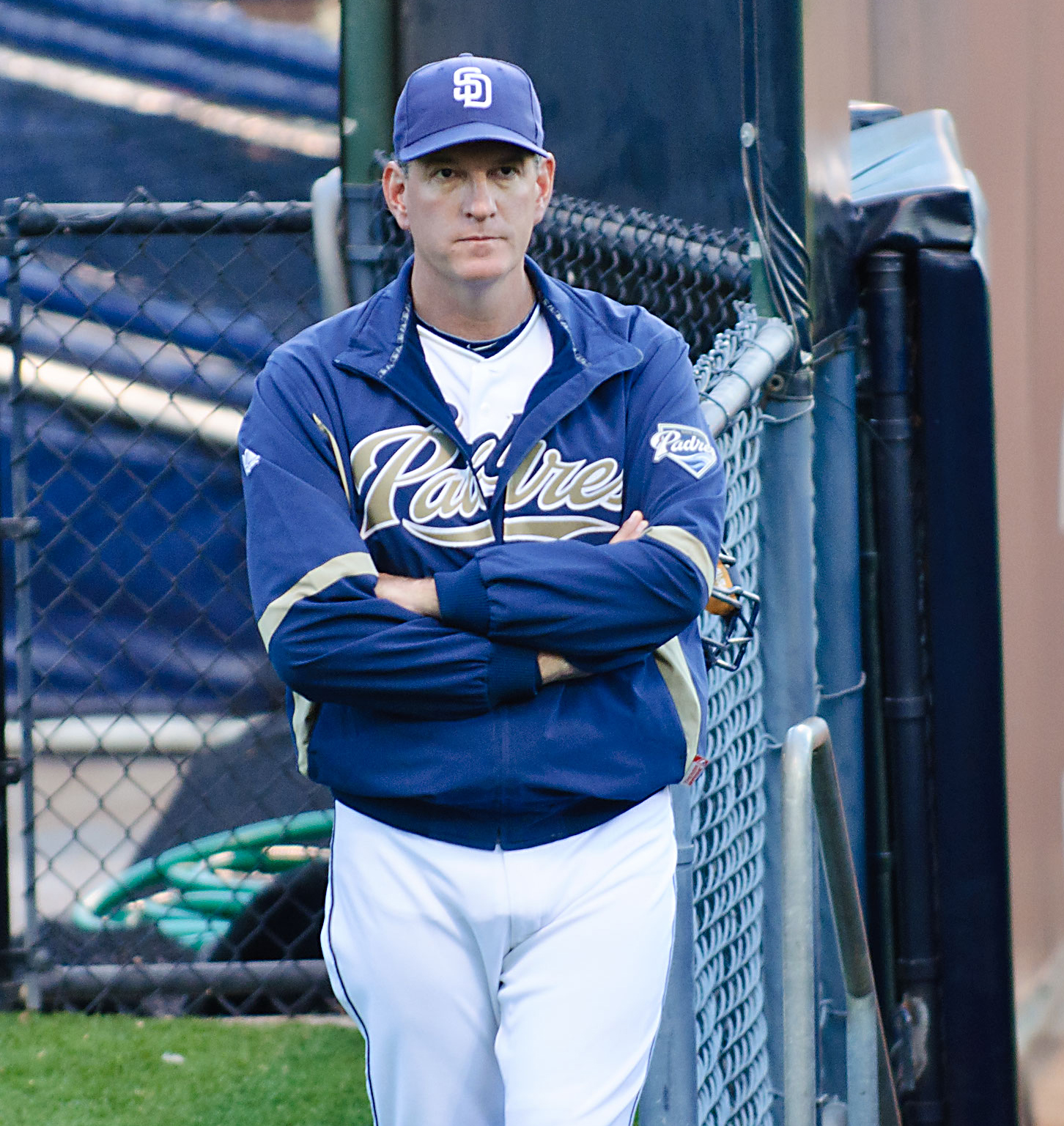
In the Padres bullpen 07/27/2010.

Darren Balsley (born October 27, 1964) is an American baseball coach. He was the pitching coach of the San Diego Padres of Major League Baseball from 2003 to 2019.

Balsley was a minor-league pitcher before he decided to go into coaching. He went to Mount Carmel High School in San Diego and attended Palomar College. He had been in this role since May 17, 2003. Under his tutelage, the Padres pitching has greatly improved, with the team ERA going from 4.87 in 2003 to a Major-League best 3.70 in 2007 and again Major-League leading best 3.07 ERA in 2010. Many pitchers have gone on to have some of the best years of their careers under his coaching. These players include Heath Bell, Jake Peavy, Cla Meredith, Chris Young, Akinori Otsuka, and Kevin Cameron.
