= Shawn Estes =

American baseball player (born 1973)

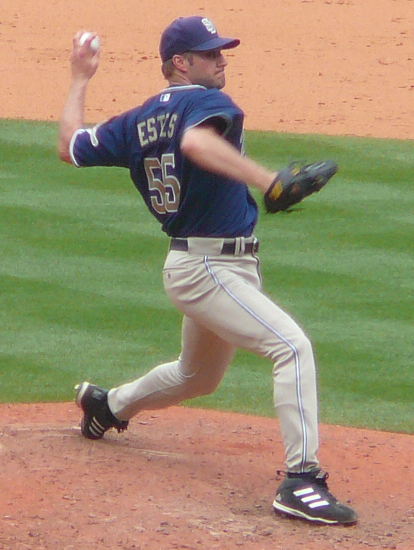
- Estes with the Padres in 2008
- Pitcher
- Born: February 18, 1973 (age 53); San Bernardino, California, U.S.
- Batted: Right Threw: Left

MLB debut
- September 16, 1995, for the San Francisco Giants

Last MLB appearance
- September 24, 2008, for the San Diego Padres

MLB statistics
- Win–loss record: 101–93
- Earned run average: 4.71
- Strikeouts: 1,210
- Stats at Baseball Reference

Teams
- San Francisco Giants (1995–2001); New York Mets (2002); Cincinnati Reds (2002); Chicago Cubs (2003); Colorado Rockies (2004); Arizona Diamondbacks (2005); San Diego Padres (2006, 2008)

Career highlights and awards
- All-Star (1997); San Francisco Giants Wall of Fame

Aaron Shawn Estes (born February 18, 1973) is an American former professional baseball pitcher who played 14 seasons in Major League Baseball (MLB). He played in MLB for the San Francisco Giants, New York Mets, Cincinnati Reds, Chicago Cubs, Colorado Rockies, Arizona Diamondbacks, and San Diego Padres.

== Early life ==
Aaron Shawn Estes was born on February 18, 1973, in San Bernardino, California. Estes attended Douglas High School in Minden, Nevada. As a senior in 1991, he was named Gatorade's Nevada State Baseball Player of the Year and finished with a 0.79 earned run average and 141 strikeouts in 61 2/3 innings pitched. At the plate, he hit .488 with eight home runs. He would go on to be enshrined in the Nevada Interscholastic Activities Association Hall of Fame in 2016.

Estes initially committed to play college baseball at Stanford University but instead signed with the Seattle Mariners after being selected in the first round of the 1991 MLB draft.

== Professional career ==
=== Minor leagues ===
Estes began his professional career with the Bellingham Mariners in "A" ball in 1991. He then played with the Appleton Foxes, Arizona League Mariners and Wisconsin Timber Rattlers from 1992 to 1995. The Mariners traded Estes to the San Francisco Giants on May 21, 1995, for Salomón Torres.

The Giants moved Estes through their farm system rapidly during the 1995 season, sending him to the Burlington Bees, San Jose Giants and Shreveport Captains.

=== San Francisco Giants (1995–2001) ===
Estes made his Major League debut with the Giants on September 16, 1995, working 5.1 innings as a starter against the Pittsburgh Pirates. He allowed five earned runs and collected the loss. He was 0–3 in three starts for the Giants that September.

Estes returned to the minors to start the 1996 season with the Phoenix Firebirds, but was recalled to the Majors to start a game against the rival Los Angeles Dodgers on July 13. Estes worked seven shutout innings to record his first career victory.

Estes had his best season as a professional in 1997, when he went 19–5 with a 3.18 ERA for the Giants. He was selected to the NL All-Star team during this season. He also had four career home runs and 28 RBIs, including a grand slam in 2000.

On May 24, 2000, Estes became the first pitcher in Giants' franchise history to hit a grand slam since Monte Kennedy in 1949.

=== New York Mets (2002) ===
The Giants traded Estes to the New York Mets on December 16, 2001, for Desi Relaford and Tsuyoshi Shinjo. The Mets signed him to a $6.2 million contract, avoiding arbitration. On June 15, 2002, Estes found himself at the center of a controversy when he started against the New York Yankees against Roger Clemens. In 2000, Clemens had beaned Mets catcher Mike Piazza, followed by the incident in Game 2 of the 2000 World Series in which Clemens threw a broken bat at Piazza. With the fans standing in anticipation of the showdown, Estes' first pitch was a fastball that was about a foot behind Clemens. Estes would hit a two-run homer off Clemens in the fifth inning of the eventual 8-0 Mets win, setting off a loud roar from the sellout crowd of 54,347 and derisive chants of "Ro-ger! Ro-ger!"

Estes would ultimately start 23 games for the Mets, with a record of 4-9 and a 4.55 ERA, before he was traded again on August 15 to the Cincinnati Reds for Brady Clark, Raul González, Elvin Andújar and Pedro Feliciano.

=== Cincinnati Reds (2002) ===
He pitched in six games for the Reds, finishing 1–3 with a 7.71 ERA.

=== Chicago Cubs (2003) ===
Estes signed a 1-year deal with the Cubs in 2003. He was pulled from the starting rotation in early September due to his struggles on the mound and the birth of his son. However, on September 24 with the Cubs holding a one-game lead over the Houston Astros, Estes pitched a complete-game shutout en route to an 8–0 win. Three days later, the Cubs clinched the division. He ultimately finished the season with an 8–11 record and 5.73 ERA in 28 starts.

=== Colorado Rockies (2004) ===
Estes signed a minor league deal with the Colorado Rockies in 2004. He was the Rockies' Opening Day starter, besting Randy Johnson in a 6–2 victory, pitching 7 innings while allowing just 2 runs on 2 hits.

Estes enjoyed his first winning season since the year 2000, finishing the season with a 15–8 record in 34 starts, despite his 5.84 ERA being the highest among qualified starters.

=== Arizona Diamondbacks (2005) ===
Estes again signed a one-year deal with the Arizona Diamondbacks in 2005. He was placed on the DL in July with a stress fracture in his left ankle. His season was cut short and he finished the season with a record of (7-8, 4.80 in 21 starts).

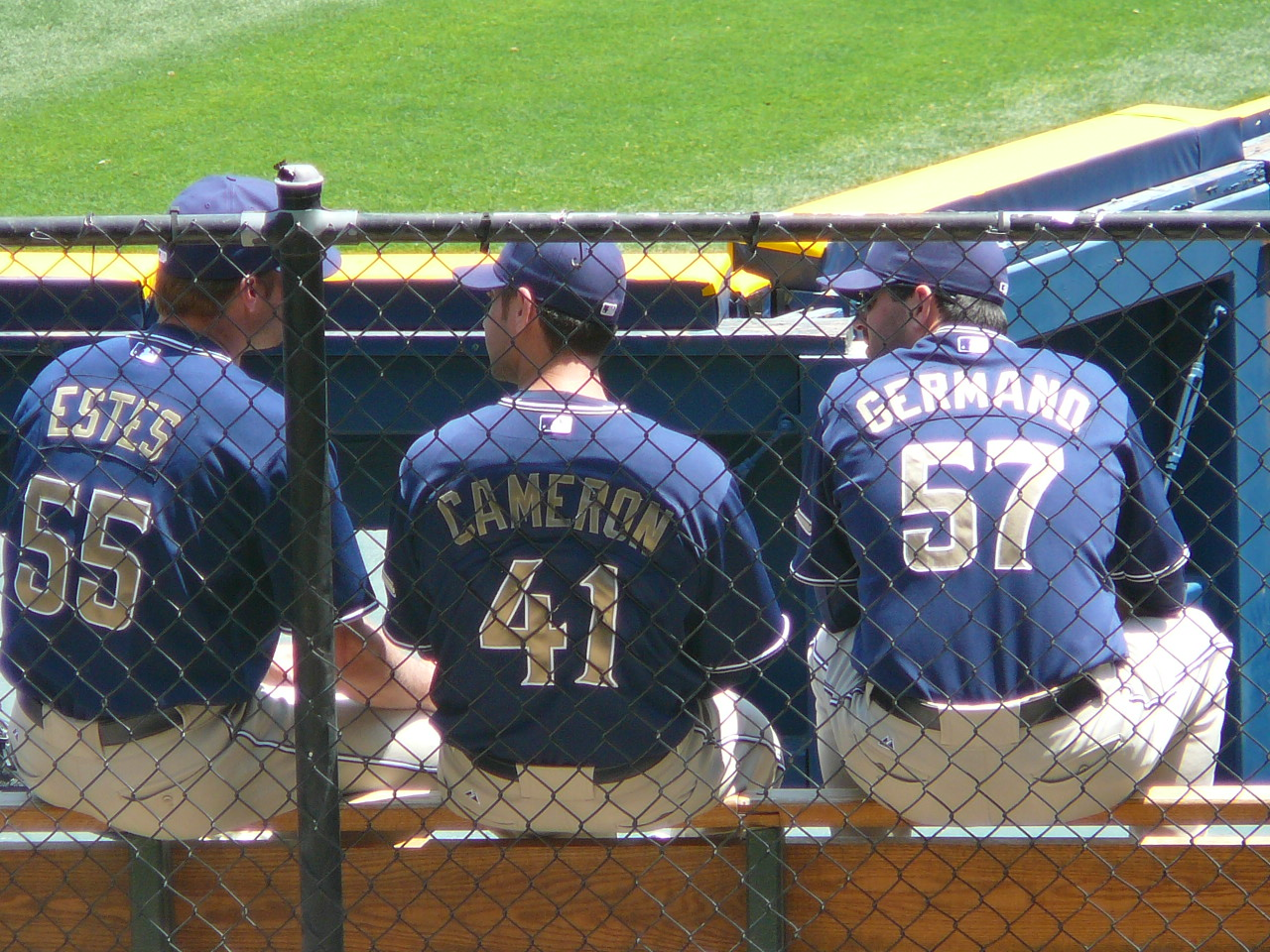
Estes (left) with fellow Padres pitchers Kevin Cameron and Justin Germano, in 2008.

=== San Diego Padres (2006, 2008) ===
Estes signed a one-year deal with the San Diego Padres for the 2006 season but made only one start before he was lost for the season due to Tommy John surgery.

Estes began his 2007 comeback with minor league appearances in Single-A, though he was soon promoted to Triple-A Portland. After his first start in Portland, Estes reaggravated his injured pitching elbow. He was placed on the disabled list retroactive to August 6.

On May 8, 2008, Estes finally returned to the Majors after missing most of the previous two seasons with injuries. He started eight games for the Padres in 2008, finishing 2–3 with a 4.74 ERA. The Padres chose not to re-sign him after the season.

=== Los Angeles Dodgers ===
On January 9, 2009, Estes signed a one-year minor league deal with the Los Angeles Dodgers with an invitation to spring training. He was expected to compete for the fifth starter position but pitched poorly in spring training games and was released on March 22. However, after thinking about his options, he decided to stay with the Dodgers and report to minor league camp to attempt to transition into a situational reliever The Dodgers assigned Estes to the AAA Albuquerque Isotopes to open the season, where he was 3–4 with a 3.08 ERA in 13 starts before announcing his retirement because he did not want to pitch in Triple-A.

=== Washington Nationals ===
On February 6, 2010, Estes signed a minor league contract with the Washington Nationals. On March 11, 2010, the Nationals released him. After his release from the Nationals, he retired from baseball.

== Life after baseball ==
On July 31, 2010, Estes was honored with a plaque on the Giants Wall of Fame along with former teammate Rich Aurilia. Estes and Aurilia serve as co-hosts of Giants pregame and postgame shows on NBC Sports Bay Area. He is also an occasional fill-in analyst on Giants road game broadcasts, working alongside Duane Kuiper and Dave Flemming. Estes previously did television color commentary for the Reno Aces of the Pacific Coast League.

== Personal life ==
Estes is married to Nathalie Evashevski Estes. They have four children, Jackson, Cody, Avery, and Asher and live in Arizona.
