= Craig Stansberry =

American baseball player (born 1982)

- Infielder
- Born: March 8, 1982 (age 44); Dammam, Saudi Arabia
- Batted: Right Threw: Right

MLB debut
- August 25, 2007, for the San Diego Padres

Last MLB appearance
- July 10, 2009, for the San Diego Padres

MLB statistics
- Batting average: .333
- Home runs: 0
- Runs batted in: 3
- Stats at Baseball Reference

Teams
- San Diego Padres (2007–2009)

Craig Leo Stansberry (born March 8, 1982) is an American former professional Major League Baseball infielder.

Stansberry was the first player in Major League Baseball history to have been born in Saudi Arabia. In 2013, Alex Wilson became the second.

== Career ==
Although he was born in Saudi Arabia, Stansberry only lived there for about a month. His father spent three years there working for a building materials company.

Stansberry attended Plano Senior High School in Texas and went on to play one year at Rice University in which he hit .309 with six home runs and 56 RBI in 70 games. He also helped the Owls win the College World Series championship in his only year at Rice. He was then drafted by the Pittsburgh Pirates in the 5th round (135th overall) in the 2003 Major League Baseball draft, and then signed by scout Tom Barnard. After four seasons in the Pirates organization, he was claimed off waivers by the San Diego Padres on December 20, 2006.

Stansberry began the 2007 season for the Portland Beavers, the Padres Triple-A team. He was called up on August 25, 2007, when everyday second baseman Marcus Giles went on the disabled list. He was batting .273 with 14 home runs and ten steals in 124 games for the Beavers at the time of his call-up. Stansberry made his major league debut on that same day as a pinch hitter. He singled in his first major league at bat off Philadelphia Phillies relief pitcher J. C. Romero.

In 2008, Stansberry played in the first Major League baseball game held in China when the Los Angeles Dodgers played the San Diego Padres in Beijing, China.

In October 2009, Stansberry was granted free agency, but re-signed with the Padres, spending the 2010 season back with the Beavers. On September 1, 2010, Stansberry broke the record for most games played with the Portland Beavers. He also set club records for most hits, doubles, and walks He ended the 2010 season with 531 games played with Portland.

== See also ==
- List of countries with their first Major League Baseball player
