= Justin Germano =

American baseball player (born 1982)

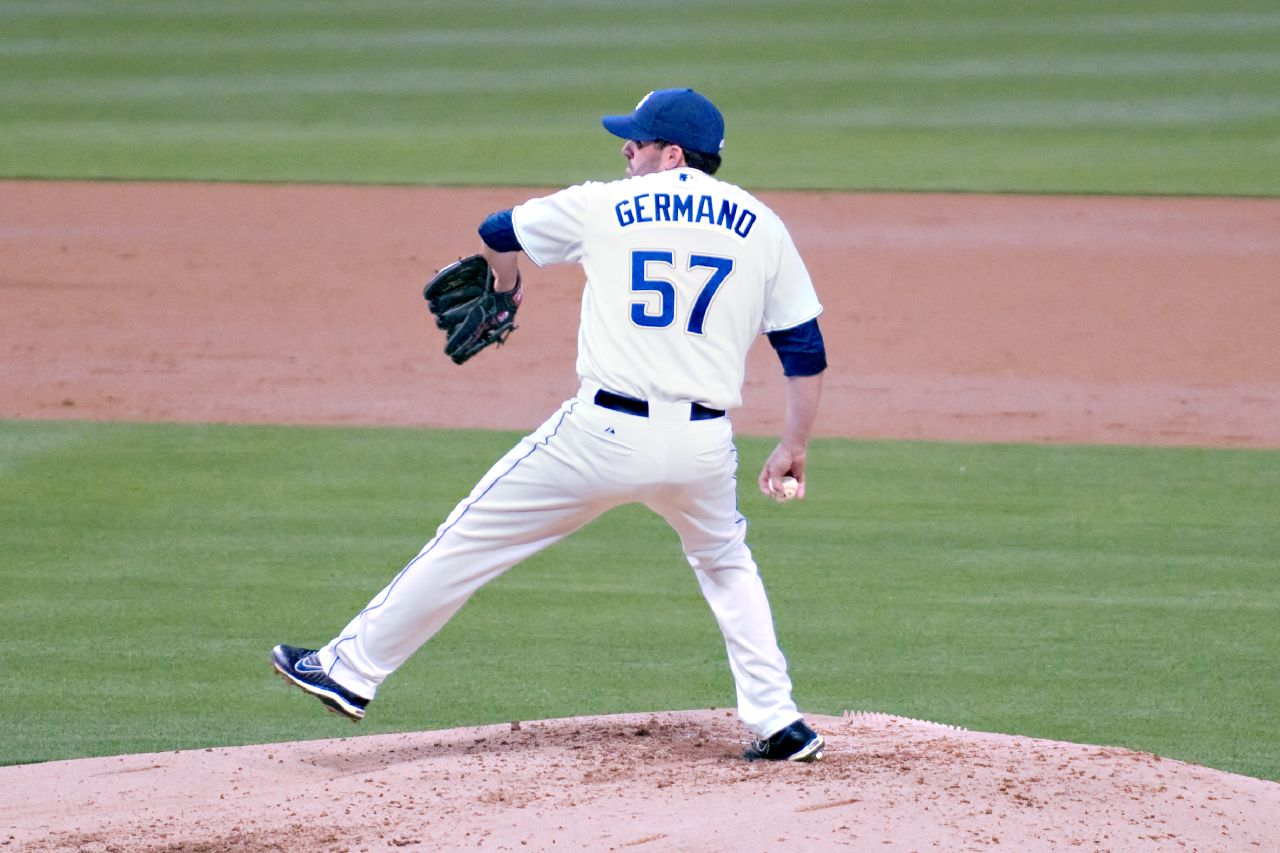
- Germano with the San Diego Padres.
- Pitcher
- Born: August 6, 1982 (age 43); Pasadena, California, U.S.
- Batted: Right Threw: Right

Professional debut
- MLB: May 22, 2004, for the San Diego Padres
- NPB: April 3, 2009, for the Fukuoka SoftBank Hawks
- KBO: August 18, 2011, for the Samsung Lions

Last appearance
- NPB: October 23, 2009, for the Fukuoka SoftBank Hawks
- MLB: May 13, 2014, for the Texas Rangers
- KBO: October 2, 2015, for the KT Wiz

MLB statistics
- Win–loss record: 10–30
- Earned run average: 5.40
- Strikeouts: 209

NPB statistics
- Win–loss record: 5–4
- Earned run average: 4.38
- Strikeouts: 42

KBO statistics
- Win–loss record: 8–7
- Earned run average: 4.01
- Strikeouts: 69
- Stats at Baseball Reference

Teams
- San Diego Padres (2004); Cincinnati Reds (2006); San Diego Padres (2007–2008); Fukuoka SoftBank Hawks (2009); Cleveland Indians (2010–2011); Samsung Lions (2011); Boston Red Sox (2012); Chicago Cubs (2012); Toronto Blue Jays (2013); Texas Rangers (2014); KT Wiz (2015)

Career highlights and awards
- Korean Series champion (2011)

Justin William Germano (born August 6, 1982) is an American former professional baseball pitcher. He played in Major League Baseball (MLB) for the San Diego Padres, Cincinnati Reds, Cleveland Indians. Boston Red Sox, Chicago Cubs, Toronto Blue Jays, and Texas Rangers. He also played in Nippon Professional Baseball (NPB) for the Fukuoka SoftBank Hawks, and in the KBO League for the Samsung Lions and KT Wiz.

== Early life ==
Germano is from Claremont, California, where he broke Mark McGwire's Claremont Little League record for most home runs in a season. He graduated from Claremont High School in 2000.

== Professional career ==
=== San Diego Padres ===
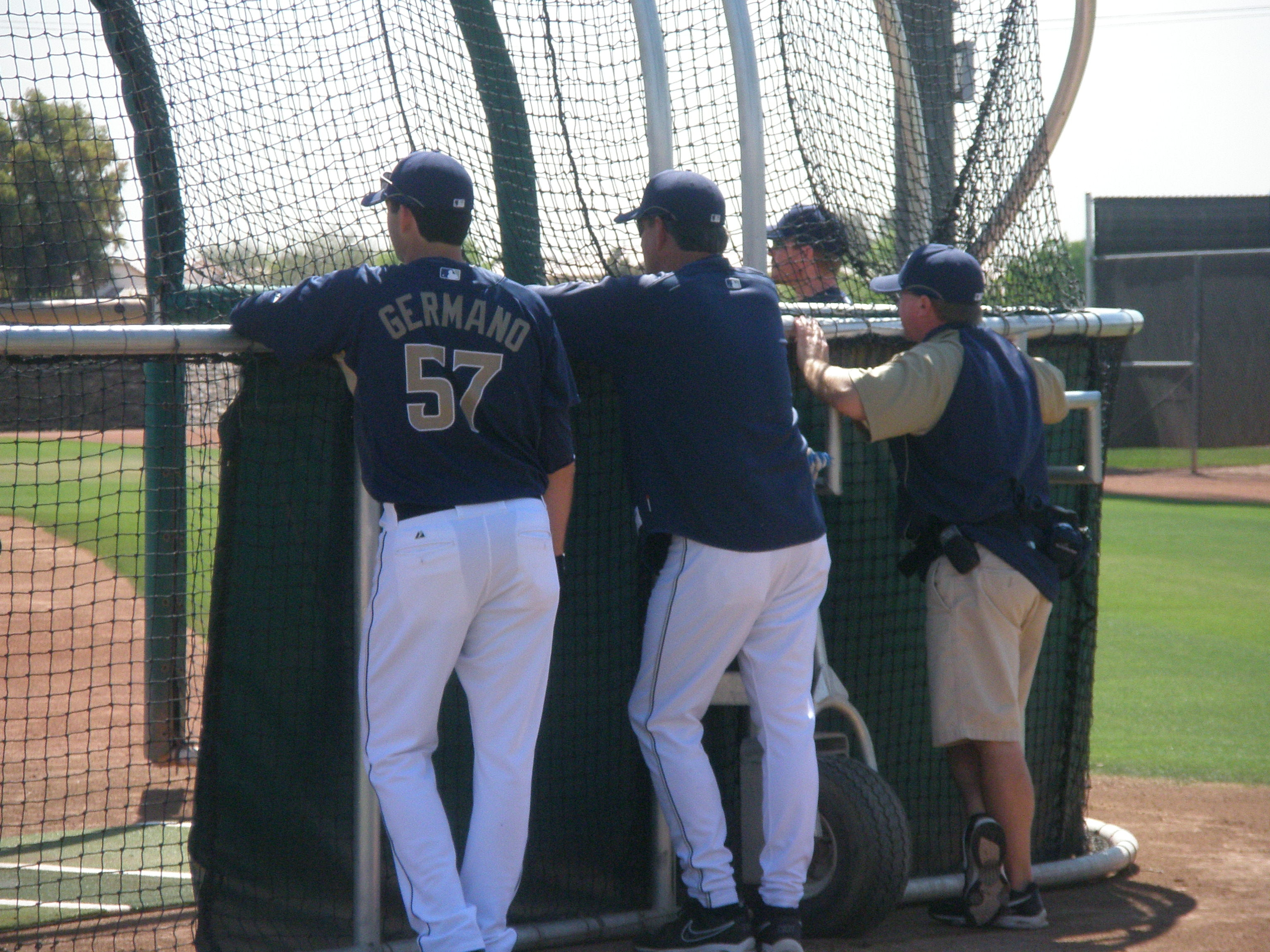
Germano (left) during 2008 Spring training

He was drafted in 2000 by the San Diego Padres. Germano made his major league debut with the San Diego Padres on May 22, 2004, getting the win as the starting pitcher against the Philadelphia Phillies. He pitched five innings, allowing five hits, four runs (three of them on a three-run home run by Chase Utley in the third inning), four walks, and five strikeouts. As a hitter, he would have two at-bats and went hitless.

=== Cincinnati Reds ===
On July 23, 2005, Germano and Travis Chick were traded to the Cincinnati Reds in exchange for Joe Randa. He made 8 starts down the stretch for the Triple–A Louisville Bats, posting a 3–2 record and 4.01 ERA with 38 strikeouts across 49 2/3 innings pitched. Germano returned to Louisville in 2006, registering an 8–6 record and 3.69 ERA with 67 strikeouts over 117 innings of work.

=== Philadelphia Phillies ===
On July 31, 2006, Germano was traded to the Philadelphia Phillies in exchange for Rhéal Cormier. He made 6 starts for the Triple–A Scranton/Wilkes-Barre Red Barons, compiling a 2–0 record and 2.82 ERA with 25 strikeouts across 38 1/3 innings pitched.

=== San Diego Padres (second stint) ===
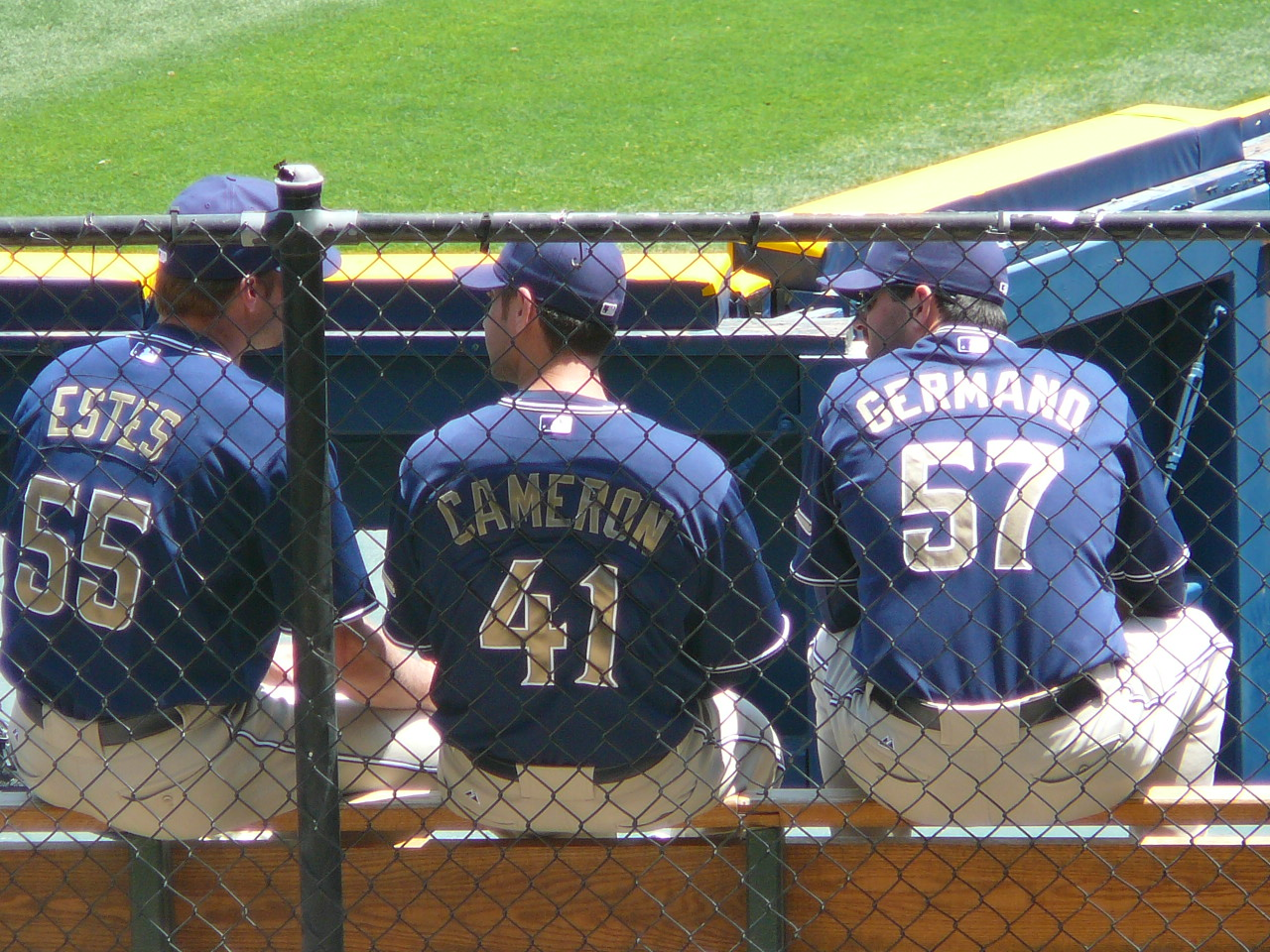
Germano (right) with fellow Padres pitchers Shawn Estes and Kevin Cameron in 2008.

On March 19, 2007, Germano was claimed off waivers by the San Diego Padres. He made 23 starts for the Padres in 2007, where he went 7–10 with a 4.46 ERA with 78 strikeouts across 133 1/3 innings pitched.

Germano is the first ever MLB pitcher to throw a major league pitch in China, starting for an exhibition game as the Padres starter against the Los Angeles Dodgers. The ball from that first pitch now resides in the Hall of Fame in Cooperstown, New York.

=== Fukuoka SoftBank Hawks ===
Just after the 2008 season ended, the Fukuoka SoftBank Hawks signed Germano as a free agent. Despite pitching well in spring training and not giving up a single run, Germano did not win a spot on SoftBank's Opening Day roster, as the Hawks were at the limit of foreign players on the roster (Chris Aguila, Kameron Loe, D.J. Houlton, and Brian Falkenborg). However, with Aguila and Loe failing to play well, Germano's chance came during Interleague play. Germano's first start came against the Hiroshima Carp, Germano was credited with the complete-game victory, giving up only two hits.

He continued to pitch well throughout the season. Germano finished the season with a 5–4 record and a 4.38 ERA. In September it was revealed that Germano had been pitching with an inflamed Achilles tendon, and was knocked out for the rest of the season and the playoffs.

The Hawks stated that they intended to bring Germano back after the offseason started, However, he turned it down, stating he wanted to return to pitch in the States.

=== Cleveland Indians ===
On March 17, 2010, Germano signed a minor league contract with the Cleveland Indians. On July 30, Germano was called up by the Cleveland Indians to join their bullpen ahead of the team's upcoming game against the Toronto Blue Jays.

Germano was designated for assignment by the Indians on May 19, 2011, to make room on the active roster for Luis Valbuena. On July 26, Germano threw a perfect game while on assignment with the Indians' Triple–A affiliate, the Columbus Clippers. He threw 60 strikes in 95 pitches to help lead the Clippers to a 3–0 victory over the Syracuse Chiefs. This was the first perfect game in Clippers history, and only the fifth to be thrown in the history of the International League.

=== Samsung Lions ===
Germano was sold to the Samsung Lions of the KBO League on August 5, 2011.

=== Boston Red Sox ===
On January 10, 2012, Germano signed a minor league contract with the Boston Red Sox. He also received an invitation to spring training. On July 3, after he exercised his opt-out clause, Germano was called up to the majors to replace Clayton Mortensen, who was optioned to the minors earlier in the day. In his 2012 debut, Germano pitched 5 2/3 scoreless innings of relief in a game against the New York Yankees on July 7. He was designated for assignment on July 13.

=== Chicago Cubs ===
Germano was traded to the Chicago Cubs on July 19, for cash considerations. Germano posted a 6.75 ERA in 13 appearances (12 starts) with the Cubs. On October 30, Germano elected free agency after being outrighted the previous week.

=== Toronto Blue Jays ===
Germano signed a minor league deal with a Spring training invitation with the Blue Jays on November 9, 2012. Germano started the 2013 season with the Triple-A Buffalo Bisons. He was called up to the Blue Jays on April 27. He appeared in one game with Toronto before being designated for assignment on May 3 to make room for Ricky Romero on the 25 man roster. On May 4, the Blue Jays announced that Germano had cleared waivers, and been assigned back to the Bisons. He became a free agent on October 1. In 25 games for Buffalo (24 starts), he went 8–9 with 13 quality starts and a 4.47 ERA, striking out 103 in 151 innings.

=== Texas Rangers ===
On December 18, 2013, Germano signed a minor league contract with the Texas Rangers with an invite to spring training. He was assigned to the Triple-A Round Rock Express. The Rangers selected his contract from Round Rock on May 8. He was designated for assignment on May 14, and assigned outright to Round Rock on May 16.

=== Los Angeles Dodgers ===
On August 15, 2014, he was traded to the Los Angeles Dodgers for future considerations and assigned to the Triple–A Albuquerque Isotopes. He appeared in three games, with two starts, and was 1–1 with a 9.88 ERA with Albuquerque. Germano elected free agency on October 12.

=== Seattle Mariners ===
On December 4, 2014, Germano signed a minor league contract with the Seattle Mariners. In 18 games (11 starts) for the Triple–A Tacoma Rainiers, he posted a 7–3 record and 2.83 ERA with 65 strikeouts across 89 innings pitched. Germano was released by the Mariners organization on July 1, 2015.

=== KT Wiz ===
On July 1, 2015, Germano signed a contract with the KT Wiz of the KBO League.

=== T & A San Marino ===
Germano spent his 2016 season, his last in professional baseball, with T & A San Marino of the Italian Baseball League.
