= Brian Giles =

American baseball player (born 1971)

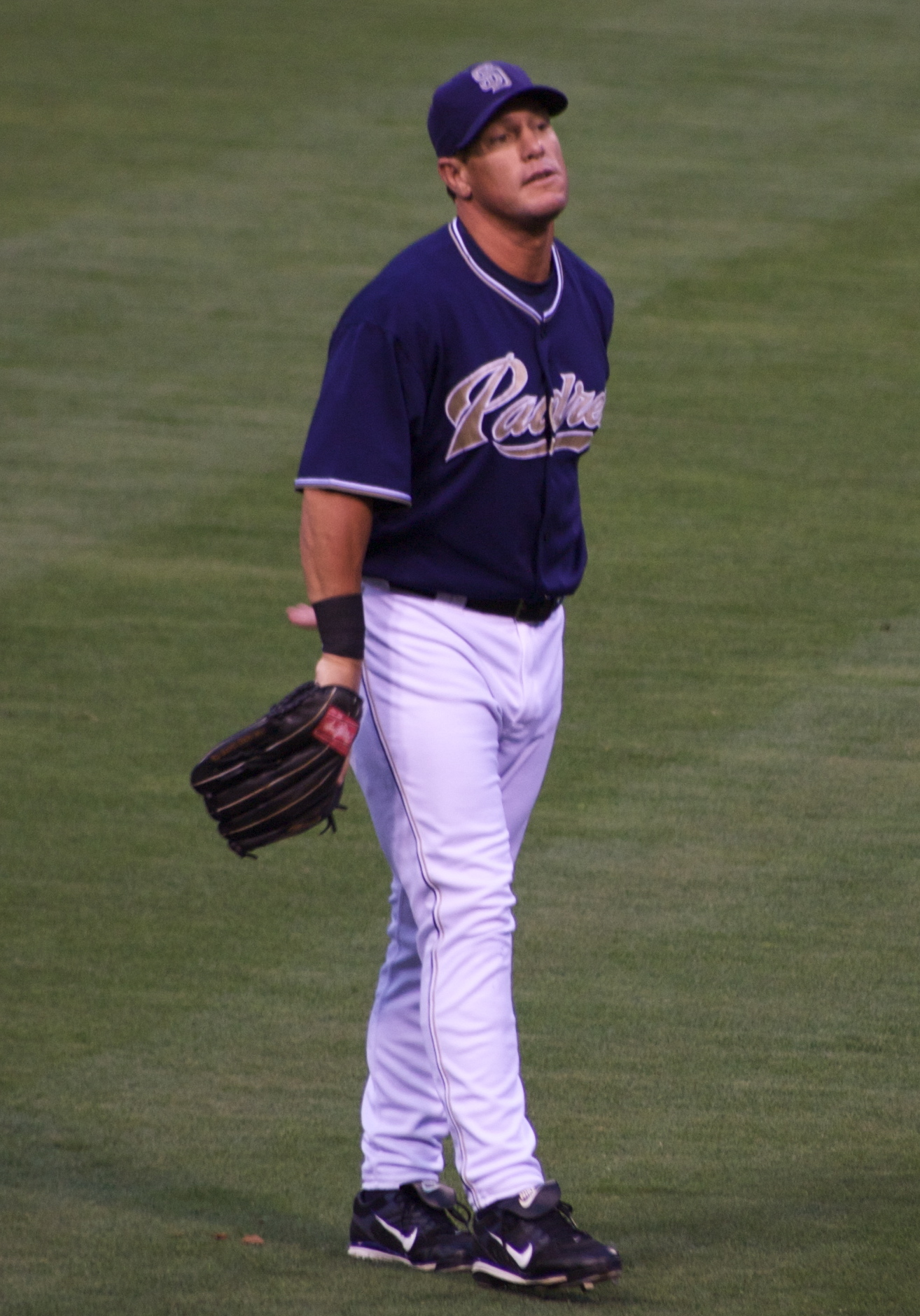
- Giles with the San Diego Padres in 2008
- Outfielder
- Born: January 20, 1971 (age 55); El Cajon, California, U.S.
- Batted: Left Threw: Left

MLB debut
- September 16, 1995, for the Cleveland Indians

Last MLB appearance
- June 18, 2009, for the San Diego Padres

MLB statistics
- Batting average: .291
- Home runs: 287
- Runs batted in: 1,078
- Stats at Baseball Reference

Teams
- Cleveland Indians (1995–1998); Pittsburgh Pirates (1999–2003); San Diego Padres (2003–2009)

Career highlights and awards
- 2× All-Star (2000, 2001)

Brian Stephen Giles (born January 20, 1971) is an American former Major League Baseball outfielder. During his career he played for the Cleveland Indians, Pittsburgh Pirates and San Diego Padres. The left-handed Giles was a two-time All-Star and had a career line of .291/.400/.502 with 287 home runs, 411 doubles, 1,078 runs batted in (RBI), and 1,183 walks in 1,847 games.

His younger brother, Marcus Giles, is a former Major League infielder who was most notable for playing with the Atlanta Braves organization. Marcus and Brian played together on the 2007 San Diego Padres.

== Professional career ==
=== Cleveland Indians ===
Giles was born in El Cajon, California, and attended Granite Hills High School. He was drafted by the Cleveland Indians in the 17th round of the 1989 Major League Baseball draft. By 1994, Giles had worked his way up to Triple-A, where he batted .313 for Charlotte making the International League All-Star team. In 1995, Giles was again in Triple-A, where he batted .310 for Buffalo and made his major league debut as a September callup on September 16 (where he would bat .556 in nine at-bats with the Indians). He was also an American Association All-Star. Giles hit .355 in 51 games for the Indians in 1996 and hit .314 in 83 games with Buffalo, again making the American Association All-Star team. In 1997, Giles established himself as a major league regular, playing 130 games for the Indians and 112 games in 1998.

=== Pittsburgh Pirates ===
On November 18, 1998, he was traded to the Pittsburgh Pirates for pitcher Ricardo Rincón.

In 1999 with the Pirates, Giles emerged as a power-hitting outfielder who also hit for average and showed plate discipline. He began a streak of hitting at least 35 home runs for four straight seasons, during which he batted no lower than .298 and was named Pittsburgh Pirates Player of the Year each year.

Giles led the 2000 club in doubles, triples, home runs, RBIs and walks. His 123 RBIs were eight shy of Paul Waner's club record of 131 set in 1927. He became the first Pirate ever to hit at least .300 with 30 plus home runs and 100 plus RBIs in back-to-back seasons, he became the third player in club history with 100 runs, 100 RBIs and 100 walks in the same season, after Barry Bonds in 1992 and Ralph Kiner from 1948–51. His 114 walks were the most by a Pirate since 1992, Bonds drew 127 walks. Giles' 74 home runs in two seasons with the club represent the most in back-to-back seasons since Willie Stargell hit 77 in 1972–73. He was named National League Player-of-the-Week after hitting .400 with two doubles, three home runs and 12 RBIs between May 2 and May 7 and shared player of the week honors with Colorado's Todd Helton after hitting .523 with three doubles, one triple, three home runs, eight RBIs and six runs scored between August 12 and August 20. Giles was named to the All-Star team for the first time in his career. He finished ninth in voting among National League outfielders.

In 2001 Giles established career highs in games played, at bats, runs and hits. He tied career highs in doubles, triples and stolen bases. At the end of the season he ranked tenth among NL players in runs (116), on-base percentage (.404), and slugging percentage (.590). His runs total was the highest by a Pirate since Ralph Kiner in 1951. He led the Pirates in batting, home runs and walks. He tied Dave Parker's club record for most total bases, 340, by a left-handed hitter. Giles hit his 100th career home run as a member of the Pirates on August 9; he is one of 17 players to homer 100 times as a Pirate. He was selected to play in the All-Star Game for the second consecutive year.

In 2002, Giles drew a career-high 135 walks, ranking him second in the National League behind San Francisco's Barry Bonds, who led with 198. He also established the club record for most base on balls in a season by a left-handed batter. His .450 on-base percentage tied him for the second-best mark in the majors, he also ranked second in the league in slugging percentage with .622, sixth in home runs, second with 80 extra-base hits ranked second behind San Francisco's Jeff Kent, tied for second in the league with 13 outfield assists and also finished third in the NL with 24 intentional walks. He homered once every 13.1 at bats, the third-best ratio in the league behind Bonds' 8.8 and Sammy Sosa's 11.3.

=== San Diego Padres ===
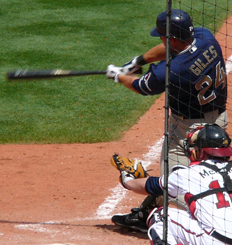
Giles in 2007.

On August 26, 2003, he was traded to his hometown San Diego Padres for Jason Bay, Óliver Pérez, and minor leaguer Corey Stewart.

Giles continued to be a patient and reliable hitter in San Diego, leading the majors with 119 walks in 2005. From 2004–2006, Giles played in over 150 games each season for the Padres, but in 2006, his batting average dropped to a career-low .263. On May 14, 2006, he drew five walks in a game, one shy of the record of six. In 2007, joined by his brother Marcus, signed as a free agent to be the starting second baseman, Giles batted .271, but missed time with an injured knee.

In 2008, Giles, in the third and final guaranteed year of his contract with the Padres, vetoed a potential trade to Boston, citing a desire to remain close to his family. In 2008, 58% of his strikeouts were "looking", by far the highest percentage in the major leagues.

In 2009, through July 1 Giles had the lowest batting average (.191), slugging percentage (.271), and OPS (.548) in the major leagues. However, he went on the disabled list soon afterward with an arthritic right knee and missed the rest of the season.

=== Retirement ===
On February 7, 2010, Giles signed a minor league contract with the Los Angeles Dodgers and received an invitation to spring training. However, after playing in just two spring training games as a designated hitter, he announced his retirement on March 11, 2010.

== Domestic abuse ==
Giles was sued by his former girlfriend for more than $10 million. She alleged Giles broke an oral and/or implied agreement that he would take care of her for an indefinite period of time. She alleged Giles began abusing her in 2002, and battered her while she was pregnant with Giles' child, and caused her to have a miscarriage. She dropped the allegations that Giles caused the miscarriage before the trial began. A jury found that both Giles and his girlfriend, Cheri Olvera, committed acts of domestic violence against each other but that there were no damages. The jury also refused to award damages on Olvera's contract claim, finding that Olvera's alleged terms were not clear enough so that both Olvera and Giles could understand what each was required to do. Instead, the jury found that Olvera must return the $107,000 engagement ring Giles provided to her or pay the $107,000 as damages. Following Giles' dispute with Olvera and given the nature of the court case, Giles' endorsement contract with Nair Hair Removal products was terminated. In August 2018 the San Diego Padres cut ties with Brian Giles and his brother Marcus, in both cases over domestic violence issues.

== See also ==
- List of Major League Baseball career home run leaders
- List of Major League Baseball career doubles leaders
- List of Major League Baseball career bases on balls leaders
- List of Major League Baseball career runs scored leaders
- List of Major League Baseball ultimate grand slams
