= Marcus Giles =

American baseball player (born 1978)

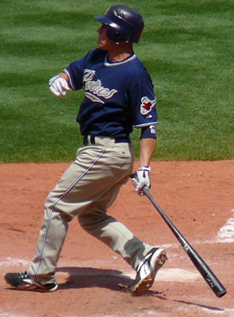
- Giles with the San Diego Padres in 2007
- Second baseman
- Born: May 18, 1978 (age 48); San Diego, California, U.S.
- Batted: Right Threw: Right

MLB debut
- April 17, 2001, for the Atlanta Braves

Last MLB appearance
- September 28, 2007, for the San Diego Padres

MLB statistics
- Batting average: .277
- Home runs: 76
- Runs batted in: 333
- Stats at Baseball Reference

Teams
- Atlanta Braves (2001–2006); San Diego Padres (2007)

Career highlights and awards
- All-Star (2003)

Marcus William Giles (born May 18, 1978) is an American former Major League Baseball player. He was a second baseman and batted right-handed. His older brother, Brian Giles, was an outfielder who also played in the Major Leagues. Marcus and Brian played together on the 2007 San Diego Padres.

== Career ==
Giles was selected by the Atlanta Braves in the 53rd round of the 1996 Major League Baseball draft and made his major league debut in 2001. He hit a grand slam for his first career home run off Mike Hampton of the Colorado Rockies. He became the first Braves player in 24 years to have his first MLB home run be a grand slam. Despite usually having success during his opportunities in majors, he spent the next two years shuttling between Atlanta and their Triple-A affiliate in Richmond. In 2002, his year was marred by a severe ankle sprain in May, and the death of his premature daughter, Lundyn Mae. Giles lost his second base starting job to the injury and, shortly after returning, was demoted to Richmond. He did not play in Atlanta again until August.

In 2003, Giles was given the starting job for good, and proceeded to put up such impressive numbers that he was selected to play in the 2003 All-Star Game. Unfortunately, he suffered a concussion the week prior to the game when Chicago Cubs pitcher Mark Prior collided with him on the basepaths. After missing about a week with the injury, Giles returned to the lineup in top form. He finished the 2003 season with 49 doubles, breaking the Braves record for doubles in a season. Giles had the best range factor among NL second baseman and was third among all NL position players in wins above replacement (as calculated by Baseball Reference).

In 2004, Giles was poised to wage a campaign similar to 2003 but, on May 15, 2004, against the Milwaukee Brewers, while drifting way back into center field to catch a pop fly, he collided with center fielder Andruw Jones. Giles suffered a broken collarbone, a concussion, and a bruised right wrist and did not play again until July 15, 2004, missing 52 games.

Giles avoided fluke injuries in 2005 and was able to again be a consistent contributor for the Braves. He doubled 45 times (second most in the National League), scored a career high 104 runs, and was 16 for 19 in stolen base attempts.

With the departure of shortstop Rafael Furcal in late 2005, the Braves moved Giles to the lead-off position in the lineup for the 2006 season. By the end of the season, Giles had become vocal in his objections over batting leadoff. His .262 average was his lowest since becoming a starter.

Giles was hospitalized in Philadelphia on September 2, 2006, after experiencing pain in his chest and abdomen. On September 3, he was sent back to Atlanta to undergo a cardiovascular test. Giles told the Atlanta Journal-Constitution that he may have a damaged heart valve. On September 4, however, it was determined that his heart was perfectly healthy, and he was instead diagnosed with acid reflux, which is not as serious. He rejoined the team in New York City that evening.

In a cost-cutting measure, and due to a decline of production, the Braves non-tendered Giles on December 12, making him a free agent.

He signed a one-year deal with the Padres before the 2007 season, but did not live up to expectations and was waived on October 26, 2007.

Due to a poor performance in 2007, Giles could not get a major league contract and settled for a minor league deal with the Colorado Rockies. However, the Rockies released him before the start of the season. Giles then agreed to terms with the Los Angeles Dodgers on a minor league contract, but had a change of heart on his way to report to the Dodgers' Triple-A affiliate in Las Vegas and turned down the deal.

On January 6, 2009, he signed a minor league contract with the Philadelphia Phillies. He did not make the team, and was released on March 30.

In 792 games over seven seasons, Giles compiled a .277 batting average (813-for-2934) with 468 runs, 187 doubles, 16 triples, 76 home runs, 333 RBI, 70 stolen bases, 318 bases on balls, .353 on-base percentage and .429 slugging percentage. He finished his career with a .981 fielding percentage. In 25 postseason games, he hit .217 (20-for-92) with 15 runs, 3 doubles, 2 home runs, 6 RBI and 7 walks.

== Personal life ==
Giles and his ex-wife, Tracy, have 3 daughters.
