= Justin Hampson =

American baseball player (born 1980)

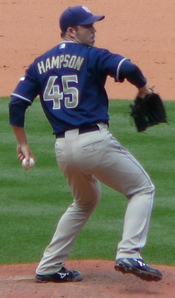
- During his tenure with the San Diego Padres
- Pitcher
- Born: May 24, 1980 (age 46); Belleville, Illinois, U.S.
- Batted: Left Threw: Left

MLB debut
- September 10, 2006, for the Colorado Rockies

Last MLB appearance
- October 2, 2012, for the New York Mets

MLB statistics
- Win–loss record: 5-4
- Earned run average: 3.23
- Strikeouts: 66
- Stats at Baseball Reference

Teams
- Colorado Rockies (2006); San Diego Padres (2007–2008); New York Mets (2012)

Justin Michael Hampson (born May 24, 1980) is an American former professional baseball pitcher. He played in Major League Baseball (MLB) for the Colorado Rockies, San Diego Padres and New York Mets.

== Career ==
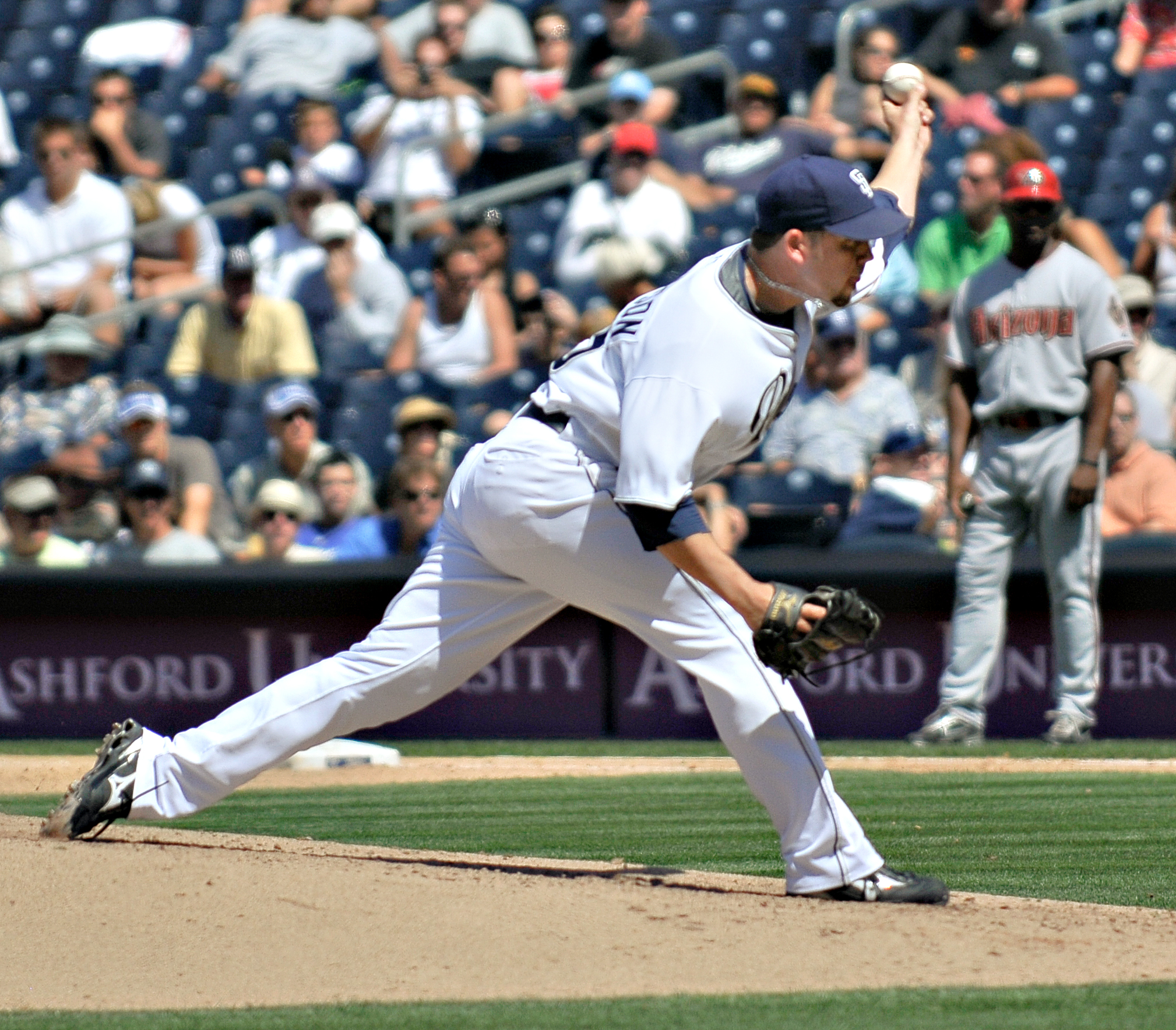
Hampson in 2007.

=== Colorado Rockies ===
Drafted by the Colorado Rockies in the 28th round of the 1999 MLB amateur draft, Hampson made his Major League Baseball debut with the Colorado Rockies on September 10, 2006.

=== San Diego Padres ===
On August 10, 2008, Hampson pitched a scoreless fifth, sixth and seventh innings for the win after starter Chris Young gave up 7 runs in four innings in a 16–7 win over the Rockies. Hampson was released by the Padres on April 1, 2009.

=== Oakland Athletics ===
On May 27, 2009, Hampson signed a Minor League contract with the Oakland Athletics.

=== Independent baseball ===
Hampson pitched for the York Revolution and Long Island Ducks in 2010.

=== New York Mets ===
On February 16, 2011, Hampson signed a minor league contract with the New York Mets. On June 25, 2012, he was called up by the Mets after Vinny Rottino was designated for assignment. However, on July 4, he was designated for assignment after just three relief appearances. He was called up again September 4 along with five other players as part of the Mets' September callups and proceeded to pitch in 10 games over the remainder of the season, yielding two runs in 8 2/3 innings. Following the season, Hampson was outrighted off the Mets' 40-man roster, and he declared free agency. He signed a minor league contract with the Mets on February 18, 2013.
