= Drew Macias =

American baseball player (born 1983)

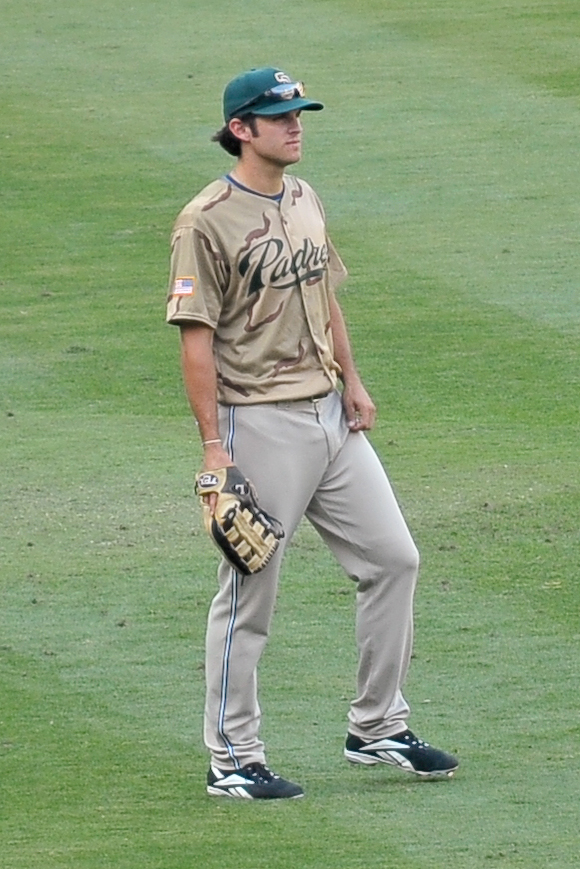
- Macias with the San Diego Padres
- Outfielder
- Born: March 7, 1983 (age 42); Fontana, California, U.S.
- Batted: Left Threw: Left

MLB debut
- September 29, 2007, for the San Diego Padres

Last appearance
- October 4, 2009, for the San Diego Padres

MLB statistics
- Batting average: .198
- Home runs: 3
- Runs batted in: 12
- Stats at Baseball Reference

Teams
- San Diego Padres (2007–2009)

Andres Apolonio "Drew" Macias (born March 7, 1983) is an American former professional baseball outfielder. Macias made his MLB debut in 2007 for the San Diego Padres.

Macias attended Chaffey College and was drafted in the 35th round by the Padres in the 2002 Major League Baseball draft and signed on May 18, 2003.

== Professional career ==
=== San Diego Padres ===
Macias batted .251 with 10 doubles, four triples, two home runs and 13 RBIs in 61 games with Rookie-Level Idaho Falls Chukars in 2003. He was tied for fourth in the Pioneer League in stolen bases with 15. He led the team in hits, triples, steals, runs scored, sacrifices, games and at-bats. He was promoted to the Class-A Fort Wayne TinCaps on August 31 and made his season finale that night going 0-2.

In 2004 Macias played his first full season at Class-A Fort Wayne where he appeared in 129 games, batting .266 with 18 doubles, five triples, eight home runs and 55 RBIs. He led the Wizards in sacrifices with four while ranking second in triples, sacrifice flies, with six, and games played. Hit .321 with runners in scoring position.

Macias posted a .289 batting average with 23 doubles, six triples, six home runs and 66 RBIs in 128 games at Class-A Advanced Lake Elsinore in 2005. He established career highs in average, hits, doubles, triples, RBIs, runs scored and at-bats.

He moved up to Double-A in 2006 with the Mobile Bay Bears and hit .256 with 7 homers, and was named to the Southern League All-Star team. He was promoted to the Triple-A Portland Beavers in 2007 and hit .282, and was called up to San Diego on September 27, after injuries to Milton Bradley and Mike Cameron left the Padres thin in the outfield.

In 2008, Macias went back to Double-A with the San Antonio Missions, where he hit .288, scored 92 runs, and drew a career high 83 walks. Macias was again called up to San Diego on September 6, 2008 and was impressive in his first major league start in the outfield, chalking up 3 hits in 5 at-bats, 2 RBIs and a home run into the right field bleachers for his first major league hit.

Macias split the 2009 season between the Triple-A Portland Beavers and the Padres. With the Beavers he hit .232 with five home runs 27 RBIs and five steals. With the Padres he hit .197 with one home runs, seven RBIs and eight runs.

=== Arizona Diamondbacks ===
Macias was signed to a minor league contract which included an invitation to spring training by the Arizona Diamondbacks on December 4, 2009.

=== Return to San Diego ===
After starting 2011 with the independent Camden Riversharks, Macias signed a minor league contract with the Padres in August.

=== Los Angeles Angels of Anaheim ===
On January 11, 2012, Macias signed a minor league deal with the Los Angeles Angels of Anaheim that included an invitation to spring training.

He was released by the Angles March 29, 2012 and is signed with the Camden Riversharks.
