= Brady Clark =

American baseball player (born 1973)

- Outfielder
- Born: April 18, 1973 (age 53); Portland, Oregon, U.S.
- Batted: Right Threw: Right

MLB debut
- September 3, 2000, for the Cincinnati Reds

Last MLB appearance
- April 22, 2008, for the New York Mets

MLB statistics
- Batting average: .277
- Home runs: 36
- Runs batted in: 210
- Stats at Baseball Reference

Teams
- Cincinnati Reds (2000–2002); New York Mets (2002); Milwaukee Brewers (2003–2006); Los Angeles Dodgers (2007); San Diego Padres (2007); New York Mets (2008)

Brady William Clark (born April 18, 1973) is an American former Major League Baseball outfielder. Brady is a class of 1991 graduate of Sunset High School in Beaverton, Oregon, and 1996 graduate of the University of San Diego, where he played college baseball for the Toreros from 1992 to 1995. He was named to the All-West Coast Conference Team in 1995.

== Cincinnati Reds ==
Clark was signed as an undrafted free agent by the Cincinnati Reds in 1996 after graduating from college. He began his professional career with the Class-A Burlington Bees in 1997, hitting .325 with 11 homers and 31 steals and being selected to the Midwest League All-Star team.

He played for the Double-A Chattanooga Lookouts in 1998-1999. In 1999, he hit .326 with 17 homers and 25 steals. He was honored with a selection as a Double-A All-Star, Southern League All-Star, and Southern League Most Valuable Player.

Clark played for the Triple-A Louisville RiverBats in 2000 and 2001.

Clark made his major league debut on September 3, 2000, as a pinch hitter against the Montreal Expos and he recorded his first big league hit on September 13 against Félix Heredia of the Chicago Cubs. His first home run was against Chicago White Sox pitcher Mark Buehrle as the leadoff hitter in the 1st inning on June 13, 2001.

On September 18, 2001, in the first game back after MLB paused following the attacks of September 11, Clark hit a walk-off two-run single with two outs in the bottom of the ninth to help defeat the Chicago Cubs.

== New York Mets (1st time) ==
Clark was traded by the Reds to the New York Mets on August 15, 2002, for Shawn Estes. He played in 10 games for the Mets, primarily as a pinch hitter in 2002, getting 5 hits in 12 at-bats. He played a couple spring training games before being sent down.

== Milwaukee Brewers ==
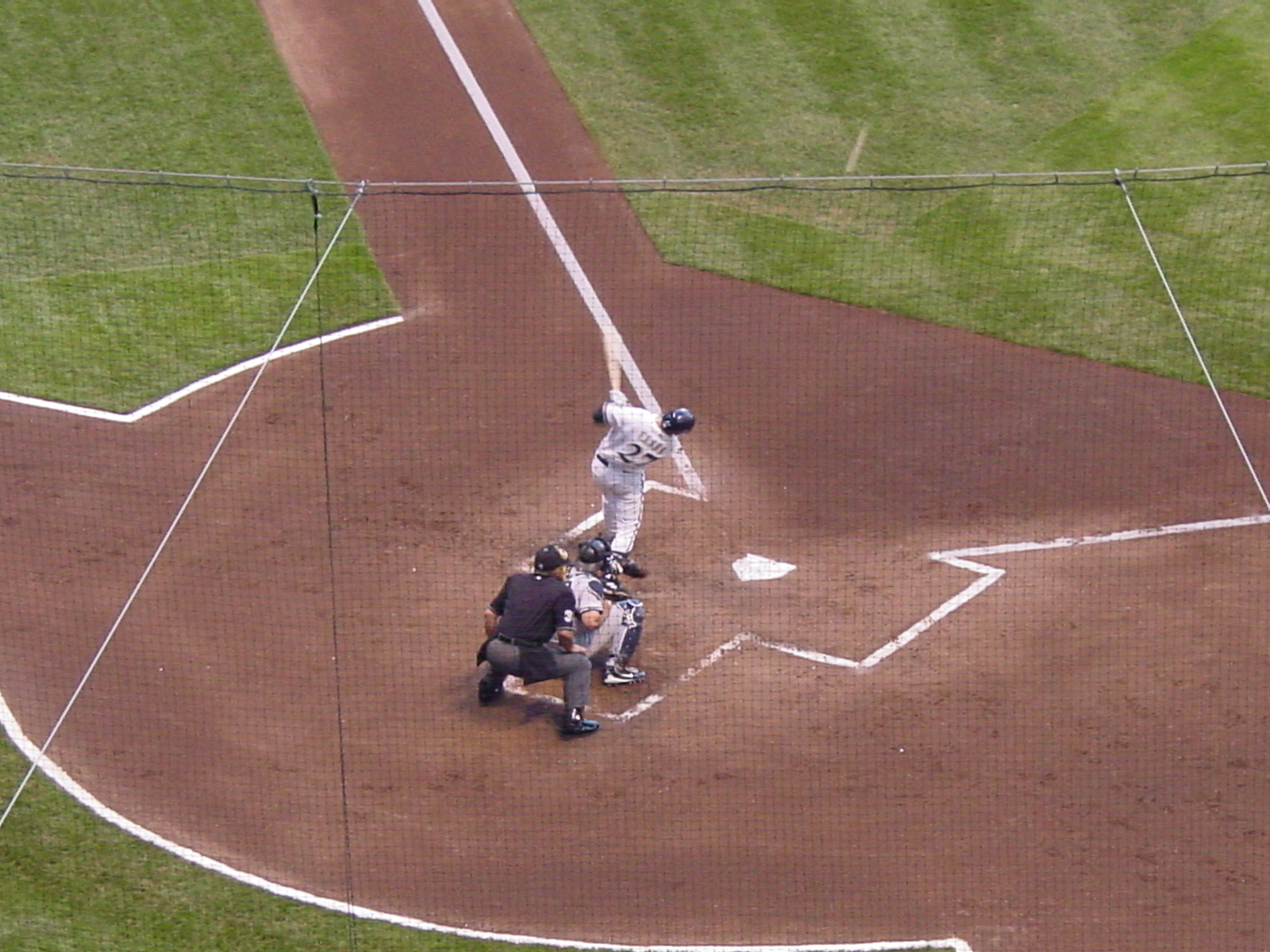
Brady Clark blasting a hit to left field against the New York Yankees at Miller Park on June 6, 2005

He was claimed off waivers by the Milwaukee Brewers from the New York Mets in 2003. Following the 2004 season the Brewers traded starting center fielder Scott Podsednik for Carlos Lee, clearing the way for Brady Clark to become the starting center fielder. Clark made the most of the opportunity in 2005 with a team leading batting average of .306 with 94 runs scored. Clark established career highs in batting average, hits, runs scored, doubles, home runs, RBI, sacrifice hits, hit by pitches, and singles in 145 games played in the 2005 season.

Following Clark's breakout 2005 season, the Brewers and Clark entered into contract negotiations. In a deal to avoid an arbitration hearing on February 8, 2006, at 9:30 a.m., Clark and the Brewers agreed to a one-year, $3.2 million contract after a long negotiation process at 1:45 a.m., with under eight hours before the hearing was scheduled to begin. After announcing the original deal that morning, the sides would agree to a two-year, $7 million deal later in the day with just one phone call.

== Los Angeles Dodgers ==
On March 26, 2007, Clark and cash considerations were traded to the Los Angeles Dodgers for Elmer Dessens. Clark made his Dodgers debut on April 2, 2007, at Miller Park, his former home ballpark when he played with the Brewers. Entering the game in the 6th inning, Clark recorded a 9th inning, one-out double, one of only two Dodger hits on the day off Brewers ace Ben Sheets.

He saw limited playing time with the Dodgers, primarily as a defensive replacement/pinch runner and was eventually released on June 20, 2007.

== Boston Red Sox ==
Brady Clark was signed to a minor league deal by the Boston Red Sox on July 26, 2007. He requested and had his release from Boston granted on August 6, 2007, after little over a week with their Triple-A club in Pawtucket.

== San Diego Padres ==
Clark was signed to a minor league deal by the San Diego Padres after being granted his release from the Red Sox on August 6, 2007. He was playing with the Portland Beavers, the Triple-A affiliate of the Padres in the Pacific Coast League, until the Padres called Clark up when the rosters expanded on September 1. On October 1, 2007, Clark played in a one-game Wild Card playoff against the Colorado Rockies. He went 1–4 with one RBI, which came off a fielder's choice. He left the game in the top of the 10th inning for pinch hitter, Terrmel Sledge.

Clark was released by the Padres following the season on October 4, 2007.

== New York Mets (2nd time) ==
Clark became a New York Met for the second time, signing a minor league contract in February 2008. Mets starters' injuries combined with a solid spring training won Clark a spot on the Mets opening day roster. However, he was designated for assignment a month into the season when Moisés Alou returned from an injury. He then joined the Mets' Triple-A Club, the New Orleans Zephyrs, but played only 8 games before getting injured and missing the rest of the season. He became a free agent at the end of the season.

== Chicago White Sox ==
On February 1, 2010, Clark signed a minor league contract with the Chicago White Sox.

== Retirement ==
Clark retired after not making the team out of spring training. In 2015, he joined the Dodgers organization as an outfield/baserunning coordinator.
