= Cla Meredith =

American baseball player (born 1983)

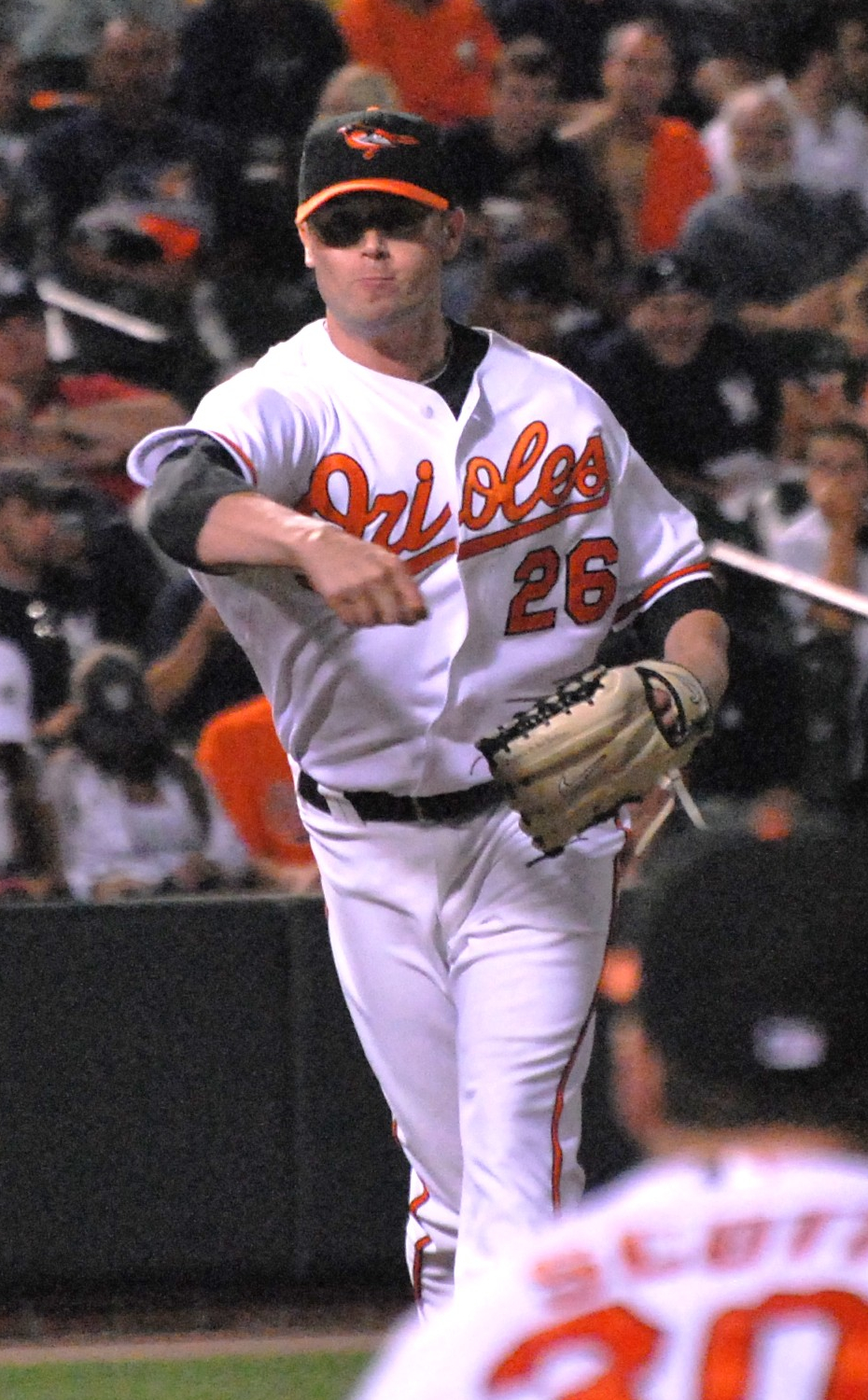
- Meredith with the Baltimore Orioles in 2009
- Relief pitcher
- Born: June 4, 1983 (age 43); Richmond, Virginia, U.S.
- Batted: Right Threw: Right

MLB debut
- May 8, 2005, for the Boston Red Sox

Last MLB appearance
- May 27, 2010, for the Baltimore Orioles

MLB statistics
- Win–loss record: 14–14
- Earned run average: 3.62
- Strikeouts: 189
- Stats at Baseball Reference

Teams
- Boston Red Sox (2005); San Diego Padres (2006–2009); Baltimore Orioles (2009–2010)

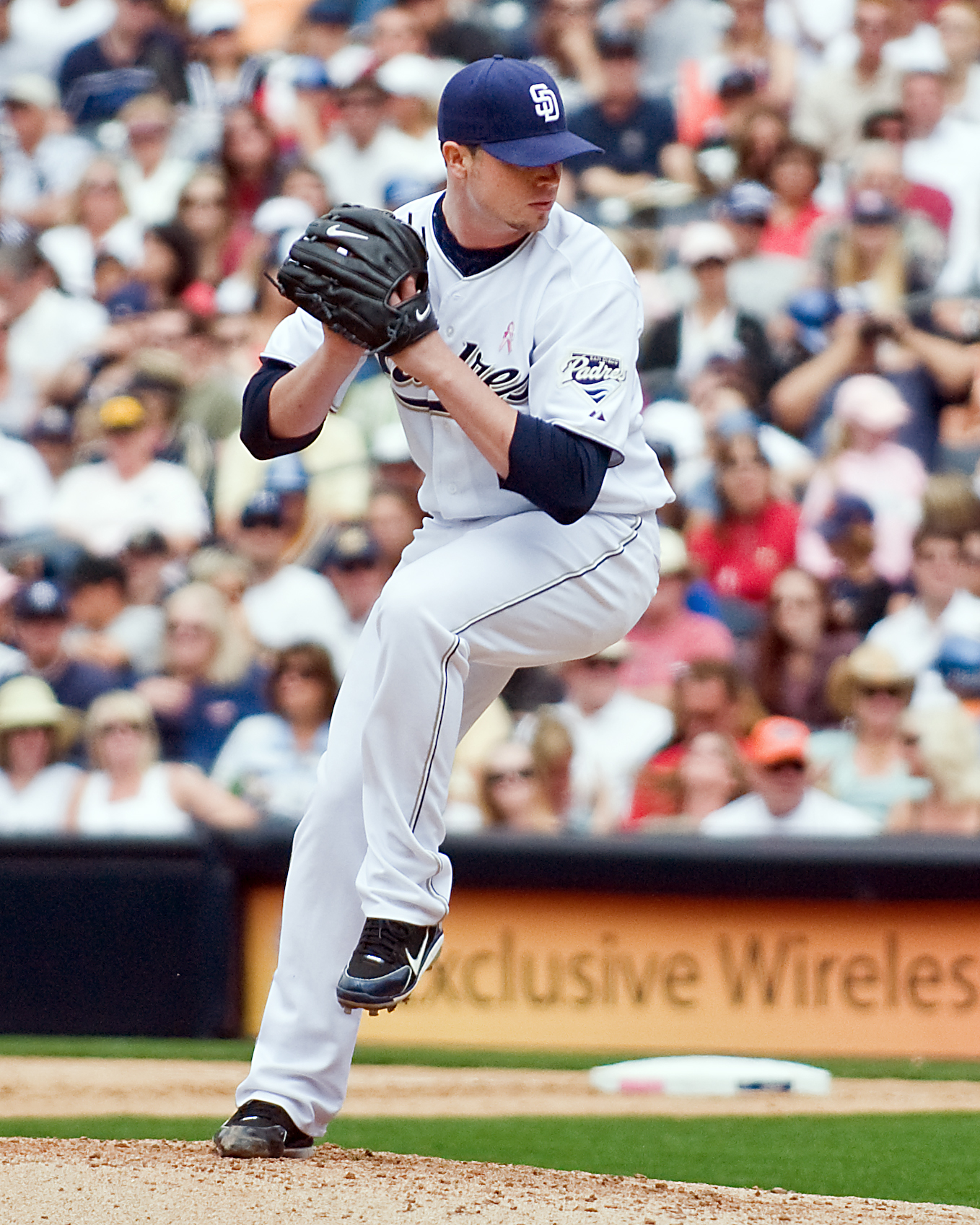
Meredith pitching for the San Diego Padres in 2008.

Olise Cla Meredith III (/ˈkleɪ/; born June 4, 1983), nicknamed "the Claw", is an American former professional baseball relief pitcher. He played in Major League Baseball (MLB) for the Boston Red Sox, San Diego Padres, and Baltimore Orioles.

== Collegiate career ==
Meredith attended Virginia Commonwealth University and played on their baseball team. Meredith was used almost exclusively as a reliever. He put up his best numbers in 2003, going 6-0 with a school record 1.19 ERA, which was 2nd best in the NCAA Division I. Meredith posted 8 saves that year, with 70 strikeouts, and only 16 walks. He is also VCU's all time ERA leader at 2.52.

== Professional career ==
=== Boston Red Sox ===
Meredith was drafted in the 6th round (185th overall) 2004 Major League Baseball draft by the Boston Red Sox after his junior year at VCU. He started his pro career with their Single-A affiliate the Augusta GreenJackets. In 13 games, he gave up no runs and saved six games, while striking out 18 and walking three.

He was promoted to Sarasota of the Florida State League after his performance in Augusta and put up a 0-2 record with a 2.20 ERA in 16 games with 12 saves, 16 strikeouts and only three walks. In 2005, he pitched 15 innings over 12 games for the Portland Sea Dogs without giving up an earned run, striking out 12 while walking three.

He made his major league debut on May 8, 2005 against Seattle. Meredith walked two batters before allowing a grand slam to Richie Sexson.

=== San Diego Padres ===
On May 1, 2006, Meredith was traded to the Padres, along with then-Red Sox backup catcher Josh Bard, for catcher Doug Mirabelli. Meredith earned a win in his first appearance for San Diego on May 13, 2006, starting off a record-setting rookie campaign. His 1.07 ERA and .170 batting average against led the National League (minimum 50 innings pitched).

He did not surrender a run in 28 consecutive appearances, a span of 33 2/3 innings from July 18 through September 12. That streak set a franchise record, eclipsing Randy Jones' 30-inning scoreless streak. The 33 2/3 scoreless innings also tied Orel Hershiser's mark in 1984 for the second-longest streak by a rookie since 1970. It now stands as the second-longest scoreless stretch by a rookie relief pitcher in the live-ball era (1920). Meredith's Padres record stood for 20 years, when it was broken by reliever Mason Miller in 2026.

=== Baltimore Orioles ===
In July 2009, Meredith was traded to the Baltimore Orioles for infielder Oscar Salazar.

On December 12, 2009, Meredith avoided arbitration and agreed to a one-year contract with the Baltimore Orioles.

On April 25, 2010, Meredith recorded the only save of his MLB career during a Orioles extra inning win over the Red Sox.

After getting sent down on June 22, 2010, he was designated for assignment to make room for recently acquired Jake Fox.

=== Washington Nationals ===
The Washington Nationals signed Meredith to a minor league contract that included an invitation to spring training on February 2, 2011. He was released prior to the start of the season on March 27.

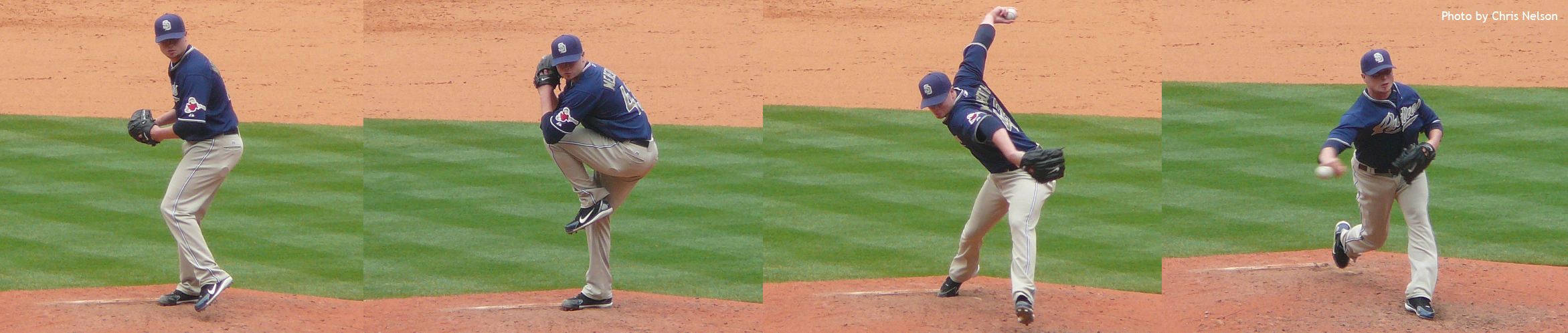
Meredith's pitching motion.

== Post-baseball ==
Meredith currently resides in Richmond, Virginia with his wife Natalie and 3 children. He is a professional firefighter for Henrico County.
