= Kevin Cameron (baseball) =

American baseball player (born 1979)

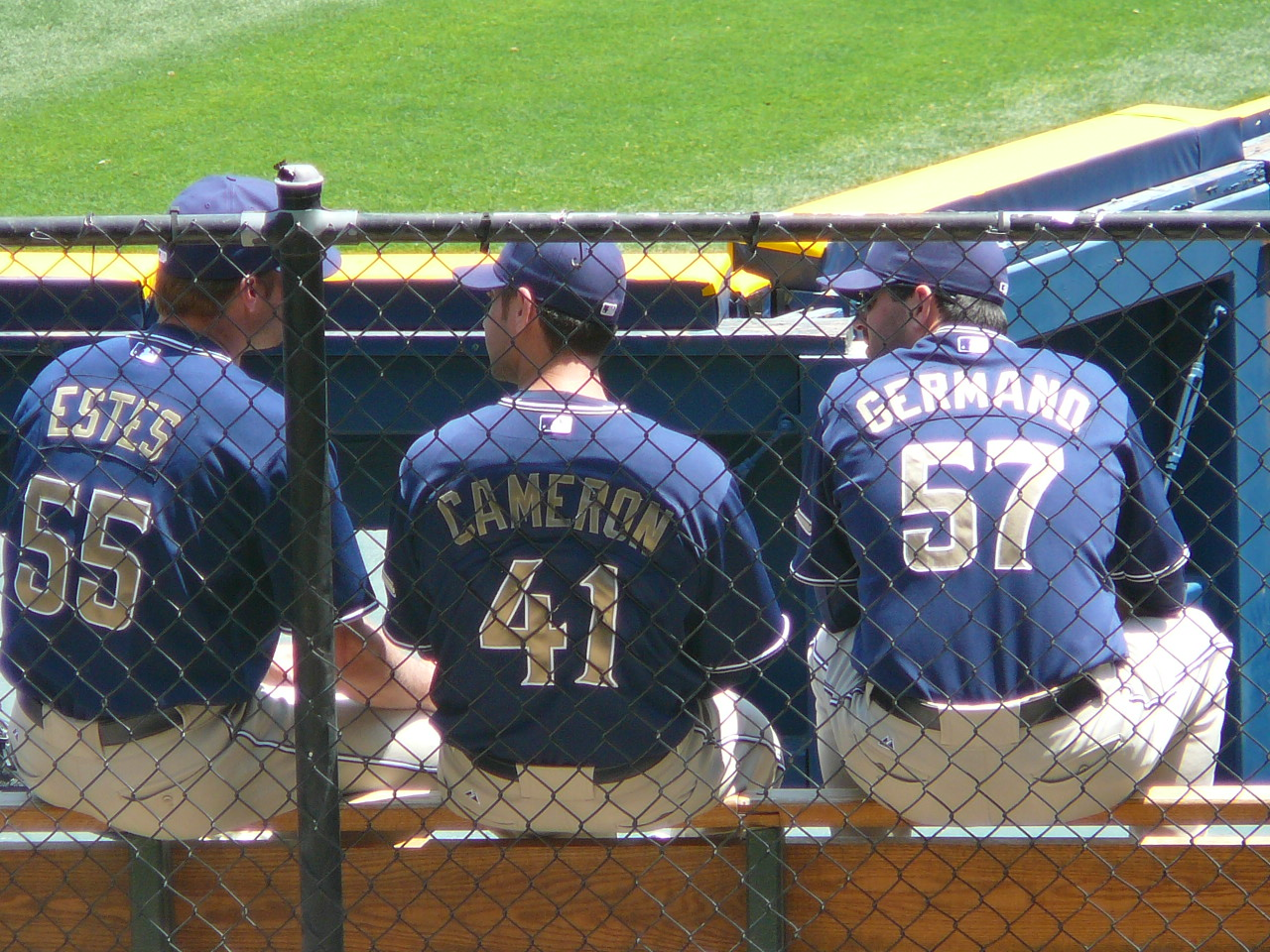
- Cameron (center) with fellow Padres pitchers Shawn Estes and Justin Germano, in 2008
- Pitcher
- Born: December 15, 1979 (age 46); Joliet, Illinois, U.S.
- Batted: Right Threw: Right

MLB debut
- April 5, 2007, for the San Diego Padres

Last MLB appearance
- June 1, 2009, for the Oakland Athletics

MLB statistics
- Win–loss record: 2–0
- Earned run average: 3.02
- Strikeouts: 70
- Stats at Baseball Reference

Teams
- San Diego Padres (2007–2008); Oakland Athletics (2009)

Kevin John Cameron (born December 15, 1979) is an American former professional baseball pitcher. He played in Major League Baseball (MLB) for the San Diego Padres and Oakland Athletics.

== Early life ==
Cameron is a graduate of Joliet Catholic High School. Cameron played for the Georgia Tech baseball team.

== Baseball career ==
He was acquired by the San Diego Padres from the Minnesota Twins as a Rule 5 Draft choice. Cameron made his major league debut on April 5, 2007. His first season was exceptional serving as a middle reliever; he logged 58 innings over 48 appearances with a 2.79 ERA.

On December 1, 2008, Cameron signed a contract with the Oakland Athletics and was invited to spring training.

He was granted free agency on October 15, 2009. On January 11, 2010, Cameron signed a contract with the San Francisco Giants but never played a game for the team.
