= 2008 Chicago Cubs season =

2008 Chicago Cubs
- National League Central champions
- League: National League
- Division: Central
- Ballpark: Wrigley Field
- City: Chicago
- Record: 97–64 (.595)
- Divisional place: 1st
- Owners: Tribune Company
- General managers: Jim Hendry
- Managers: Lou Piniella
- Television: CSN Chicago; WGN America; WGN-TV; CSN Chicago Plus (CLTV); WCIU-TV (Len Kasper, Bob Brenly, Cory Provus)
- Radio: WGN (AM) 720 (Pat Hughes, Ron Santo, Cory Provus)
- Stats: ESPN.com; Baseball Reference

The 2008 Chicago Cubs season was the 137th season of the Chicago Cubs franchise, the 133rd in the National League and the 93rd at Wrigley Field. The season began at home on March 31 against the Milwaukee Brewers. The Cubs were champions of the National League Central for the second year in a row, accumulating 97 regular season wins—the most since 1945. It was the first time since 1908 that the Cubs made postseason appearances in consecutive seasons.

At the All-Star break in July, the Cubs led the NL Central and were tied with the Los Angeles Angels of Anaheim for the best record in the major leagues. They tied a National League record with eight players selected to the All-Star team.

On September 20, the Cubs clinched the NL Central championship with a 5–4 win over the St. Louis Cardinals. Despite their regular season success, the team did not advance past the first round of the playoffs; they were swept 3–0 by the Los Angeles Dodgers in the NLDS.

Lou Piniella, in his second year as the Cubs' manager, won the National League's Manager of the Year Award in 2008. In addition, catcher Geovany Soto won the 2008 National League Rookie of the Year Award.

== Regular season ==
=== Game log ===
2008 Game Log (97–64)
March: 0–1 (Home: 0–1; Away: 0–0 )

#	Date	Opponent	Score	Win	Loss	Save	Attendance	Record	Box
1	March 31	Brewers	4–3 (10)	Gagné (1-0)	**Howry** (0-1)	Riske (1)	41,089	0-1	

April: 17–9 (Home: 11–4; Away: 6–5 )

#	Date	Opponent	Score	Win	Loss	Save	Attendance	Record	Box
2	April 2	Brewers	8–2	Suppan (1-0)	**Lilly** (0-1)		39,468	0-2	
3	April 3	Brewers	6–2	**Dempster** (1-0)	Bush (0-1)	**Wood** (1)	37,973	1-2	
4	April 4	Astros	4–3	Wright (1-0)	**Lieber** (0-1)	Valverde (1)	37,812	1-3	
5	April 5	Astros	9–7	**Hart** (1-0)	Oswalt (0-2)	**Wood** (2)	40,707	2-3	
6	April 6	Astros	3–2	**Zambrano** (1-0)	Villarreal (0-2)	**Wood** (3)	40,929	3-3	
7	April 7	@ Pirates	10–8 (12)	**Lieber** (1-1)	Meek (0-1)	**Mármol** (1)	37,491	4-3	
8	April 9	@ Pirates	6–4 (15)	**Hart** (2-0)	Dumatrait (0-1)	**Marshall** (1)	9,735	5-3	
9	April 10	@ Pirates	7–3	**Lieber** (2-1)	Morris (0-1)		9,798	6-3	
10	April 11	@ Phillies	5–3	Myers (1-1)	**Zambrano** (1-1)	Lidge (2)	37,368	6-4	
11	April 12	@ Phillies	7–1	Hamels (2-1)	**Lilly** (0-2)		45,072	6-5	
12	April 13	@ Phillies	6–5 (10)	**Wood** (1-0)	Seánez (0-1)	**Howry** (1)	40,095	7-5	
13	April 15	Reds	9–5	**Dempster** (2-0)	Harang (1-2)		39,130	8-5	
14	April 16	Reds	12–3	**Zambrano** (2-1)	Fogg (1-2)		40,099	9-5	
15	April 17	Reds	9–2	Vólquez (2-0)	**Lilly** (0-3)		39,534	9-6	
16	April 18	Pirates	3–2	**Hill** (1-0)	Snell (2-1)	**Wood** (4)	39,118	10-6	
17	April 19	Pirates	13–1	**Marquis** (1-0)	Gorzelanny (1-2)		40,298	11-6	
18	April 20	Pirates	13–6	**Dempster** (3-0)	Duke (0-1)		41,405	12-6	
19	April 21	Mets	7–1	**Zambrano** (3-1)	Maine (1-2)		40,582	13-6	
20	April 22	Mets	8–1	**Lilly** (1-3)	Figueroa (1-1)		40,503	14-6	
21	April 23	@ Rockies	7–6 (10)	**Wood** (2-0)	Wells (1-1)	**Mármol** (2)	36,864	15-6	
22	April 24	@ Rockies	4–2	Cook (3-1)	**Hart** (2-1)	Fuentes (1)	32,791	15-7	
23	April 25	@ Nationals	5–3	Rauch (2-0)	**Howry** (0-2)		35,154	15-8	
24	April 26	@ Nationals	7–0	**Zambrano** (4-1)	Chico (0-5)		35,188	16-8	
25	April 27	@ Nationals	2–0	Lannan (2-2)	**Lilly** (1-4)	Rauch (4)	33,795	16-9	
26	April 29	Brewers	10–7	Sheets (4-0)	**Marquis** (1-1)	Gagné (8)	39,543	16-10	
27	April 30	Brewers	19–5	**Dempster** (4-0)	Suppan (1-1)		39,908	17-10	

May: 18–11 (Home: 14–3; Away: 4–8 )

#	Date	Opponent	Score	Win	Loss	Save	Attendance	Record	Box
28	May 1	Brewers	4–3	Shouse (2-0)	**Wood** (2-1)	Gagné (9)	40,849	17-11	
29	May 2	@ Cardinals	5–3 (11)	Villone (1-0)	**Fox** (0-1)		45,077	17-12	
30	May 3	@ Cardinals	9–3	**Lilly** (2-4)	Lohse (3-1)		46,792	18-12	
31	May 4	@ Cardinals	5–3	Wellemeyer (3-1)	**Marquis** (1-2)	Isringhausen (10)	44,969	18-13	
32	May 5	@ Reds	5–3	Cueto (2-3)	**Dempster** (4-1)	Cordero (5)	20,289	18-14	
33	May 6	@ Reds	3–0	**Zambrano** (5-1)	Harang (1-5)	**Wood** (5)	21,153	19-14	
34	May 7	@ Reds	9–0	Vólquez (5-1)	**Lieber** (2-2)		28,418	19-15	
35	May 9	D-backs	3–1	**Lilly** (3-4)	Haren (4-2)	**Wood** (6)	40,236	20-15	
36	May 10	D-backs	7–2	**Eyre** (1-0)	Qualls (0-4)		41,597	21-15	
37	May 11	D-backs	6–4	**Mármol** (1-0)	Peña (0-1)	**Wood** (7)	39,740	22-15	
38	May 12	Padres	12–3	**Zambrano** (6-1)	Wolf (2-3)		39,528	23-15	
39	May 13	Padres	4–3	Estes (1-0)	**Marquis** (1-3)	Hoffman (7)	40,028	23-16	
40	May 14	Padres	8–5	**Lilly** (4-4)	Peavy (4-3)		39,650	24-16	
41	May 15	Padres	4–0	**Dempster** (5-1)	Maddux (3-4)	**Wood** (8)	40,629	25-16	
42	May 16	Pirates	7–4	**Gallagher** (1-0)	Gorzelanny (3-4)	**Wood** (9)	40,537	26-16	
43	May 17	Pirates	7–6	Marte (3-0)	**Mármol** (1-1)	Capps (10)	41,686	26-17	
44	May 18	Pirates	4–3	**Marquis** (2-3)	Dumatrait (1-2)	**Wood** (10)	41,321	27-17	
45	May 19	@ Astros	7–2	**Lilly** (5-4)	Moehler (1-1)		32,458	28-17	
46	May 20	@ Astros	4–2	Sampson (3-3)	**Dempster** (5-2)	Valverde (13)	33,339	28-18	
47	May 21	@ Astros	5–3	Chacón (0-1)	**Gallagher** (1-1)	Valverde (14)	33,251	28-19	
48	May 23	@ Pirates	12–3	**Zambrano** (7-1)	Duke (2-3)		32,656	29-19	
49	May 24	@ Pirates	5–4 (14)	Grabow (4-1)	**Wuertz** (0-1)		29,929	29-20	
50	May 25	@ Pirates	6–5 (11)	Marte (4-0)	**Lieber** (2-3)		29,415	29-21	
51	May 26	Dodgers	3–1	**Dempster** (6-2)	Billingsley (4-6)	**Wood** (11)	41,583	30-21	
52	May 27	Dodgers	3–1	**Gallagher** (2-1)	Kuroda (2-4)	**Wood** (12)	39,894	31-21	
53	May 28	Dodgers	2–1 (10)	**Howry** (1-2)	Park (1-1)		39,945	32-21	
54	May 29	Rockies	8–4	**Wuertz** (1-1)	Herges (2-2)		39,851	33-21	
55	May 30	Rockies	10–9	**Eyre** (2-0)	Corpas (0-3)	**Wood** (13)	39,686	34-21	
56	May 31	Rockies	5–4	**Dempster** (7-2)	Rusch (1-3)	**Mármol** (3)	41,529	35-21	

June: 15–12 (Home: 8–2; Away: 7–10 )

#	Date	Opponent	Score	Win	Loss	Save	Attendance	Record	Box
57	June 1	Rockies	5–3	**Gallagher** (3-1)	Jiménez (1-6)	**Wood** (14)	41,730	36-21	
58	June 2	@ Padres	7–6	**Zambrano** (8-1)	Baek (0-2)	**Wood** (15)	30,259	37-21	
59	June 3	@ Padres	9–6	**Marquis** (3-3)	Corey (1-1)	**Wood** (16)	24,477	38-21	
60	June 4	@ Padres	2–1	Bell (3-3)	**Lilly** (5-5)	Hoffman (12)	25,258	38-22	
61	June 5	@ Dodgers	5–4	**Howry** (2-2)	Saito (3-2)	**Wood** (17)	44,988	39-22	
62	June 6	@ Dodgers	3–0	Kuroda (3-5)	**Gallagher** (3-2)		52,484	39-23	
63	June 7	@ Dodgers	7–3	Lowe (4-5)	**Zambrano** (8-2)		50,020	39-24	
64	June 8	@ Dodgers	3–1	**Marquis** (4-3)	Penny (5-8)	**Wood** (18)	49,994	40-24	
65	June 10	Braves	10–5	**Lilly** (6-5)	Glavine (2-3)		41,624	41-24	
66	June 11	Braves	7–2	**Dempster** (8-2)	Bennett (0-4)		41,497	42-24	
67	June 12	Braves	3–2 (11)	**Wood** (3-1)	Acosta (3-5)		41,517	43-24	
68	June 13	@ Blue Jays	3–2	Burnett (6-6)	**Gallagher** (3-3)	Ryan (14)	27,803	43-25	
69	June 14	@ Blue Jays	6–2	**Marquis** (5-3)	Halladay (8-6)		34,048	44-25	
70	June 15	@ Blue Jays	7–4	**Lilly** (7-5)	Litsch (7-3)		40,738	45-25	
71	June 17	@ Rays	3–2	Balfour (1-0)	**Cotts** (0-1)	Percival (16)	31,607	45-26	
72	June 18	@ Rays	5–4	Sonnanstine (8-3)	**Zambrano** (8-3)	Percival (17)	31,496	45-27	
73	June 19	@ Rays	8–3	Balfour (2-0)	**Mármol** (1-2)		34,441	45-28	
74	June 20	White Sox	4–3	**Wood** (4-1)	Linebrink (2-2)		41,106	46-28	
75	June 21	White Sox	11–7	**Marquis** (6-3)	Contreras (6-6)	**Wood** (19)	41,021	47-28	
76	June 22	White Sox	7–1	**Dempster** (9-2)	Vázquez (7-6)		41,034	48-28	
77	June 24	Orioles	7–5	Guthrie (4-7)	**Marshall** (0-1)	Sherrill (26)	41,357	48-29	
78	June 25	Orioles	7–4	**Lilly** (8-5)	Albers (3-3)	**Wood** (20)	40,754	49-29	
79	June 26	Orioles	11–4	Liz (2-0)	**Marquis** (6-4)		41,670	49-30	
80	June 27	@ White Sox	10–3	Contreras (7-6)	**Dempster** (9-3)		39,132	49-31	
81	June 28	@ White Sox	6–5	Thornton (4-1)	**Mármol** (1-3)	Jenks (18)	39,143	49-32	
82	June 29	@ White Sox	5–1	Buehrle (6-6)	**Marshall** (0-2)		39,573	49-33	
83	June 30	@ Giants	9–2	**Lilly** (9-5)	Zito (3-12)		35,311	50-33	

July: 15–11 (Home: 6–4; Away: 9–7 )

#	Date	Opponent	Score	Win	Loss	Save	Attendance	Record	Box
84	July 1	@ Giants	2–1	Cain (5-6)	**Marquis** (6-5)	Wilson (23)	33,858	50-34	
85	July 2	@ Giants	6–5	**Mármol** (2-3)	Walker (3-4)	**Wood** (21)	41,345	51-34	
86	July 3	@ Giants	8–3	Lincecum (10-1)	**Gallagher** (3-4)		40,511	51-35	
87	July 4	@ Cardinals	2–1	**Zambrano** (9-3)	Looper (9-6)	**Wood** (22)	46,450	52-35	
88	July 5	@ Cardinals	5–4	McClellan (1-3)	**Wood** (4-2)		46,865	52-36	
89	July 6	@ Cardinals	7–1	**Marshall** (1-2)	Wellemeyer (7-4)		46,752	53-36	
90	July 8	Reds	7–3	**Dempster** (10-3)	Harang (3-11)		41,360	54-36	
91	July 9	Reds	5–1	**Zambrano** (10-3)	Cueto (7-9)	**Wood** (23)	41,605	55-36	
92	July 10	Reds	12–7	Arroyo (7-7)	**Lilly** (9-6)		41,459	55-37	
93	July 11	Giants	3–1	**Howry** (3-2)	Walker (3-5)	**Wood** (24)	41,605	56-37	
94	July 12	Giants	8–7 (11)	**Marshall** (2-2)	Wilson (0-2)		41,555	57-37	
95	July 13	Giants	4–2	Lincecum (11-2)	**Dempster** (10-4)	Wilson (25)	41,574	57-38	
96	July 18	@ Astros	2–1	Geary (2-1)	**Howry** (3-3)		42,368	57-39	
97	July 19	@ Astros	4–1	Rodríguez (5-3)	**Zambrano** (10-4)	Valverde (25)	43,129	57-40	
98	July 20	@ Astros	9–0	**Dempster** (11-4)	Backe (6-10)		41,461	58-40	
99	July 21	@ D-backs	2–0	Johnson (7-7)	**Harden** (5-2)	Qualls (2)	34,627	58-41	
100	July 22	@ D-backs	9–2	Petit (1-1)	**Marquis** (6-6)		35,337	58-42	
101	July 23	@ D-backs	10–6	**Lilly** (10-6)	Davis (3-5)		37,301	59-42	
102	July 24	Marlins	6–3	**Zambrano** (11-4)	Olsen (6-5)	**Mármol** (4)	41,482	60-42	
103	July 25	Marlins	3–2	Miller (3-2)	**Howry** (3-4)	Gregg (21)	41,570	60-43	
104	July 26	Marlins	3–2 (12)	Miller (4-2)	**Gaudin** (5-4)	Gregg (22)	41,471	60-44	
105	July 27	Marlins	9–6	**Gaudin** (6-4)	Hendrickson (7-8)	**Samardzija** (1)	41,017	61-44	
106	July 28	@ Brewers	6–4	**Gaudin** (7-4)	Torres (5-3)	**Mármol** (5)	45,311	62-44	
107	July 29	@ Brewers	7–1	**Zambrano** (12-4)	Sheets (10-4)		45,069	63-44	
108	July 30	@ Brewers	7–2	**Dempster** (12-4)	Parra (9-4)		44,871	64-44	
109	July 31	@ Brewers	11–4	**Harden** (6-2)	Bush (5-9)		45,346	65-44	

August: 20–8 (Home: 12–7; Away: 8–1 )

#	Date	Opponent	Score	Win	Loss	Save	Attendance	Record	Box
110	August 1	Pirates	3–0	Karstens (1-0)	**Marquis** (6-7)	Grabow (1)	41,340	65-45	
111	August 2	Pirates	5–1	**Lilly** (11-6)	Maholm (7-7)		41,426	66-45	
112	August 3	Pirates	8–5	**Gaudin** (8-4)	Hansen (1-4)	**Mármol** (6)	41,200	67-45	
113	August 4	Astros	2–0 (8)	Moehler (7-4)	**Dempster** (12-5)	Hawkins (1)	40,867	67-46	
114	August 5	Astros	11–7	**Howry** (4-4)	Sampson (5-4)		40,416	68-46	
115	August 6	Astros	11–4	**Marquis** (7-7)	Backe (6-11)		41,107	69-46	
116	August 8	Cardinals	3–2 (11)	**Howry** (5-4)	Franklin (4-5)		41,539	70-46	
117	August 9	Cardinals	12–3	Wellemeyer (9-4)	**Zambrano** (12-5)		41,436	70-47	
118	August 10	Cardinals	6–2	**Dempster** (13-5)	Carpenter (0-1)		41,268	71-47	
--	August 12	@ Braves	Postponed (rain) Rescheduled for August 13						
119	August 13	@ Braves	10–2	**Marquis** (8-7)	Morton (3-6)		27,220	72-47	
120	August 13	@ Braves	8–0	**Harden** (7-2)	Campillo (7-5)		33,714	73-47	
121	August 14	@ Braves	11–7	**Lilly** (12-6)	Glavine (2-4)		36,365	74-47	
122	August 15	@ Marlins	6–5	**Gaudin** (9-4)	Gregg (6-5)	**Wood** (25)	28,163	75-47	
123	August 16	@ Marlins	2–1	Sánchez (2-2)	**Marshall** (2-3)	Gregg (27)	39,124	75-48	
124	August 17	@ Marlins	9–2	**Dempster** (14-5)	Pinto (2-5)		19,085	76-48	
125	August 19	Reds	5–0	**Harden** (8-2)	Cueto (8-12)		41,208	77-48	
126	August 20	Reds	2–1	Arroyo (11-10)	**Lilly** (12-7)	Cordero (24)	40,509	77-49	
127	August 21	Reds	3–2	**Zambrano** (13-5)	Fogg (2-6)	**Wood** (26)	40,370	78-49	
128	August 22	Nationals	13–5	Lannan (7-12)	**Cotts** (0-2)		40,513	78-50	
129	August 23	Nationals	9–2	**Dempster** (15-5)	Pérez (5-10)		40,708	79-50	
130	August 24	Nationals	6–1	**Harden** (9-2)	Bergmann (2-10)		40,682	80-50	
131	August 25	@ Pirates	12–3	**Lilly** (13-7)	Karstens (2-3)		14,454	81-50	
132	August 26	@ Pirates	14–9	**Marshall** (3-3)	Hansen (1-5)		17,929	82-50	
133	August 27	@ Pirates	2–0	**Marquis** (9-7)	Duke (4-13)	**Wood** (27)	15,260	83-50	
134	August 28	Phillies	6–4	**Howry** (6-4)	Durbin (5-3)	**Wood** (28)	40,362	84-50	
135	August 29	Phillies	3–2	**Samardzija** (1-0)	Condrey (3-4)	**Mármol** (7)	40,844	85-50	
136	August 30	Phillies	5–2	Myers (8-10)	**Lilly** (13-8)	Lidge (32)	41,511	85-51	
137	August 31	Phillies	5–3	Moyer (12-7)	**Marshall** (3-4)	Lidge (33)	41,544	85-52	

September: 12–12 (Home: 4–5; Away: 8–7 )

#	Date	Opponent	Score	Win	Loss	Save	Attendance	Record	Box
138	September 1	Astros	3–0	Oswalt (13-9)	**Marquis** (9-8)	Valverde (38)	40,670	85-53	
139	September 2	Astros	9–7 (11)	Wright (4-3)	**Wood** (4-3)	Valverde (39)	39,846	85-54	
140	September 3	Astros	4–0	Wolf (9-11)	**Dempster** (15-6)		40,163	85-55	
141	September 5	@ Reds	10–2	Arroyo (14-10)	**Lilly** (13-9)		31,213	85-56	
142	September 6	@ Reds	14–9	**Marquis** (10-8)	Cueto (8-13)		41,204	86-56	
143	September 7	@ Reds	4–3	Cordero (5-4)	**Wood** (4-4)		37,540	86-57	
144	September 9	@ Cardinals	4–3	Perez (3-2)	**Mármol** (2-4)		43,806	86-58	
145	September 10	@ Cardinals	4–3	**Lilly** (14-9)	Looper (12-12)	**Wood** (29)	43,955	87-58	
146	September 11	@ Cardinals	3–2	**Harden** (9-2)	Wellemeyer (12-7)	**Wood** (30)	44,155	88-58	
--	September 12	@ Astros	Postponed (Hurricane Ike) Rescheduled for September 15 @ Milwaukee						
--	September 13	@ Astros	Postponed (Hurricane Ike) Rescheduled for September 29, if necessary						
147	September 14	@ Astros at Miller Park	5–0	**Zambrano** (14-5)	Wolf (10-12)		23,441	89-58	
148	September 15	@ Astros at Miller Park	6–1	**Lilly** (15-9)	Moehler (11-7)		15,158	90-58	
149	September 16	Brewers	5–4	**Dempster** (16-6)	Sabathia (15-8)	**Wood** (31)	40,738	91-58	
150	September 17	Brewers	6–2	DiFelice (1-0)	**Marquis** (10-9)		41,200	91-59	
151	September 18	Brewers	7–6	**Wood** (5-4)	Villanueva (4-7)		40,678	92-59	
152	September 19	Cardinals	12–6	Wainwright (10-3)	**Zambrano** (14-6)		40,972	92-60	
153	September 20	Cardinals	5–4	**Lilly** (16-9)	Piñeiro (6-7)	**Wood** (32)	41,597	93-60	
154	September 21	Cardinals	5–1	**Dempster** (17-6)	Looper (12-14)		40,551	94-60	
155	September 22	@ Mets	9–5	**Marquis** (11-9)	Niese (1-1)	**Wood** (33)	51,137	95-60	
156	September 23	@ Mets	6–2	Santana (15-7)	**Gaudin** (9-5)	Ayala (9)	50,615	95-61	
157	September 24	@ Mets	9–6	**Howry** (7-4)	Ayala (2-10)	**Wood** (34)	54,416	96-61	
158	September 25	@ Mets	7–6	Smith (6-3)	**Hart** (2-2)		51,174	96-62	
159	September 26	@ Brewers	5–1	McClung (6-6)	**Marshall** (3-5)		44,084	96-63	
160	September 27	@ Brewers	7–3	**Lilly** (17-9)	Sheets (13-9)		45,288	97-63	
161	September 28	@ Brewers	3–1	Sabathia (17-10)	**Howry** (7-5)		45,299	97-64	
162	September 29	@ Astros	Cancelled due to the Astros being eliminated from playoff contention and the Cubs having already won the NL Central.						

Legend: = Win = Loss = Postponement/Cancellation
Bold = Cubs team member

=== Season standings ===
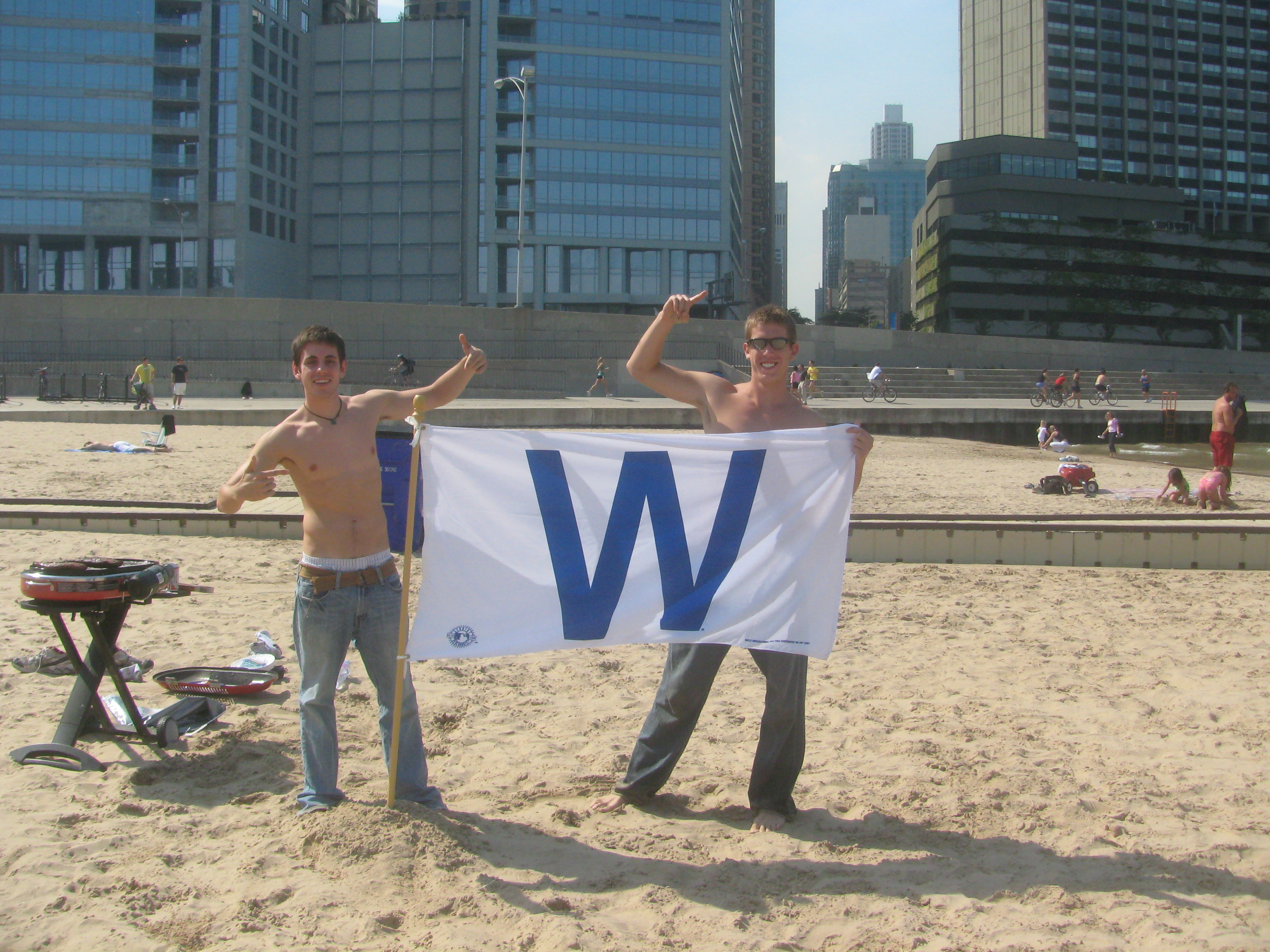
With the magic number at 1, fans had their "Cubs Win" flags flying in Chicago.

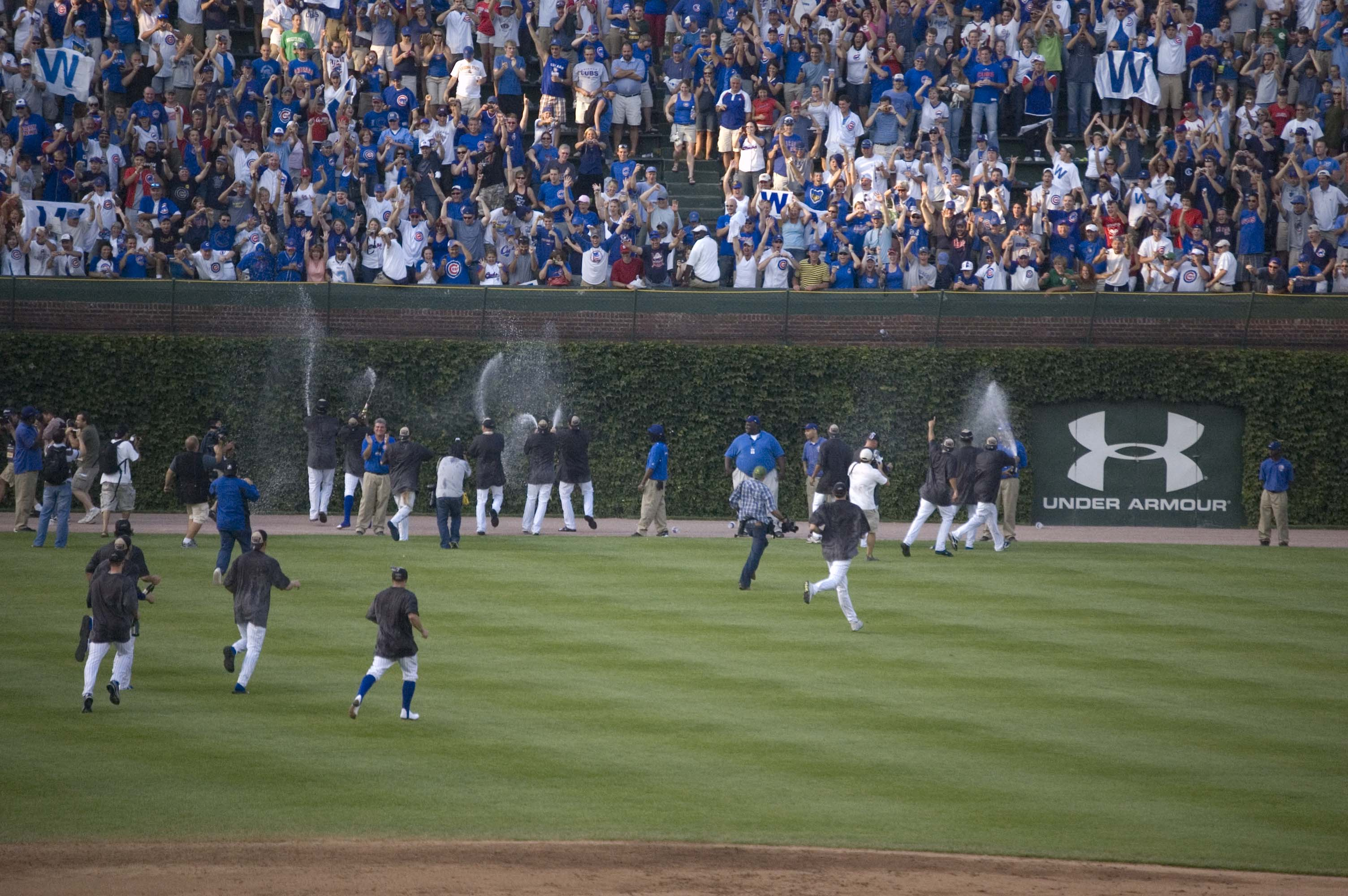
The Cubs and fans celebrate the 2008 National League Central Division championship. A few Cubs Win flags are visible.

==== National League Central ====
NL Central
Team	W	L	Pct.	GB	Home	Road
Chicago Cubs	97	64	.602	—	55‍–‍26	42‍–‍38
Milwaukee Brewers	90	72	.556	7½	49‍–‍32	41‍–‍40
Houston Astros	86	75	.534	11	47‍–‍33	39‍–‍42
St. Louis Cardinals	86	76	.531	11½	46‍–‍35	40‍–‍41
Cincinnati Reds	74	88	.457	23½	43‍–‍38	31‍–‍50
Pittsburgh Pirates	67	95	.414	30½	39‍–‍42	28‍–‍53

==== Record vs. opponents ====
2008 National League record Source: MLB Standings Grid – 2008
Team	AZ	ATL	CHC	CIN	COL	FLA	HOU	LAD	MIL	NYM	PHI	PIT	SD	SF	STL	WAS	AL
Arizona	–	3–5	2–4	2–4	15–3	2–7	4–2	8–10	2–5	3–3	3–4	4–3	10–8	11–7	3–4	4–2	6–9
Atlanta	5–3	–	0–6	3–3	4–3	10–8	3–3	4–2	3–6	11–7	4–14	2–5	5–1	2–5	2–5	6–12	8–7
Chicago	4–2	6–0	–	8–7	5–1	4–3	8–9	5–2	9–7	4–2	3–4	14–4	5–2	4–3	9–6	3–3	6–9
Cincinnati	4–2	3–3	7–8	–	1–5	6–2	3–12	1–7	10–8	3–4	3–5	6–9	4–3	5–1	5–10	4–3	9–6
Colorado	3–15	3–4	1–5	5–1	–	5–3	3–3	8–10	4–3	3–6	0–5	5–2	9–9	11–7	3–4	4–3	7–8
Florida	7–2	8–10	3–4	2–6	3–5	–	4–2	3–4	5–1	8–10	10–8	3–2	4–2	3–3	2–5	14–3	5–10
Houston	2–4	3–3	9–8	12–3	3–3	2–4	–	4–3	7–8	5–2	3–4	8–8	3–3	7–1	7–8	4–2	7–11
Los Angeles	10–8	2–4	2–5	7–1	10–8	4–3	3–4	–	4–2	3–4	4–4	5–2	11–7	9–9	2–4	3–3	5–10
Milwaukee	5–2	6–3	7–9	8–10	3–4	1–5	8–7	2–4	–	2–4	1–5	14–1	4–3	6–0	10–5	6–2	7–8
New York	3–3	7–11	2–4	4–3	6–3	10–8	2–5	4–3	4–2	–	11–7	4–3	2–5	5–1	4–3	12–6	9–6
Philadelphia	4–3	14–4	4–3	5–3	5–0	8–10	4–3	4–4	5–1	7–11	–	4–2	4–2	3–3	5–4	12–6	4–11
Pittsburgh	3–4	5–2	4–14	9–6	2–5	2–3	8–8	2–5	1–14	3–4	2–4	–	3–4	4–2	10–7	3–4	6–9
San Diego	8–10	1–5	2–5	3–4	9–9	2–4	3–3	7–11	3–4	5–2	2–4	4–3	–	5–13	1–6	5–1	3–15
San Francisco	7–11	5–2	3–4	1–5	7–11	3–3	1–7	9–9	0–6	1–5	3–3	2–4	13–5	–	4–3	7–0	6–12
St. Louis	4–3	5–2	6–9	10–5	4–3	5–2	8–7	4–2	5–10	3–4	4–5	7–10	6–1	3–4	–	5–1	7–8
Washington	2–4	12–6	3–3	3–4	3–4	3–14	2–4	3–3	2–6	6–12	6–12	4–3	1–5	0–7	1–5	–	8–10

=== Rally songs ===
In 2007, Ernie Banks had requested that Evanston, Illinois native Eddie Vedder write the Cubs a song, and in August 2008 Vedder recorded "All the Way", which was released on September 18, 2008. During the season, a new version of "Go, Cubs, Go" was recorded and released by the Manic Sewing Circle, although the original 1984 Steve Goodman version became the official Cubs victory song.

== Playoffs ==
=== NLDS vs. Los Angeles Dodgers ===
The Chicago Cubs were eliminated from the playoffs after Los Angeles won the series, 3-0.

==== Game 1, October 1 ====
Wrigley Field in Chicago

Team	1	2	3	4	5	6	7	8	9	R	H	E
Los Angeles	0	0	0	0	4	0	1	1	1	7	8	1
Chicago	0	2	0	0	0	0	0	0	0	2	9	1
WP: Derek Lowe (1–0) LP: Ryan Dempster (0–1); Home runs: LAD: James Loney (1), Manny Ramírez (1), Russell Martin (1); CHC: Mark DeRosa (1); Attendance: 42,099

==== Game 2, October 2 ====
Wrigley Field in Chicago

Team	1	2	3	4	5	6	7	8	9	R	H	E
Los Angeles	0	5	0	0	1	0	1	2	1	10	12	0
Chicago	0	0	0	0	0	0	1	0	2	3	8	4
WP: Chad Billingsley (1–0) LP: Carlos Zambrano (0–1); Home runs: LAD: Manny Ramírez (2); CHC: None; Attendance: 42,136

==== Game 3, October 4 ====
Dodger Stadium in Los Angeles

Team	1	2	3	4	5	6	7	8	9	R	H	E
Chicago	0	0	0	0	0	0	0	1	0	1	8	1
Los Angeles	2	0	0	0	1	0	0	0	X	3	6	0
WP: Hiroki Kuroda (1–0) LP: Rich Harden (0–1) Sv: Jonathan Broxton (1); Home runs: CHC: None; LAD: None; Attendance: 56,000

The Cubs' Game 3 loss to the Dodgers marked the franchise's ninth consecutive post-season defeat, dating back to the 2003 NLCS.

== Roster ==
2008 Chicago Cubs
Roster
Pitchers: 58 José Ascanio; 48 Neal Cotts; 46 Ryan Dempster; 47 Scott Eyre; 44 Chad Fox; 36 Sean Gallagher; 57 Chad Gaudin; 37 Ángel Guzmán; 40 Rich Harden; 22 Kevin Hart; 53 Rich Hill; 62 Bob Howry; 32 Jon Lieber; 30 Ted Lilly; 49 Carlos Mármol; 21 Jason Marquis; 45 Sean Marshall; 63 Carmen Pignatiello; 29 Jeff Samardzija; 36 Randy Wells; 34 Kerry Wood; 43 Michael Wuertz; 38 Carlos Zambrano	Catchers: 24 Henry Blanco; 55 Koyie Hill; 18 Geovany Soto; Infielders: 5 Ronny Cedeño; 7 Mark DeRosa; 17 Mike Fontenot; 25 Derrek Lee; 27 Casey McGehee; 16 Aramis Ramírez; 2 Ryan Theriot; 33 Daryle Ward; Outfielders: 15 Jim Edmonds; 1 Kosuke Fukudome; 6 Micah Hoffpauir; 9 Reed Johnson; 19 Matt Murton; 4 Eric Patterson; 20 Félix Pie; 12 Alfonso Soriano	Manager: 41 Lou Piniella; Coaching Staff: 59 Iván DeJesús (special asst); 28 Gerald Perry (hitting); 8 Mike Quade (third base); 50 Larry Rothschild (pitching); 39 Matt Sinatro (first base); 35 Lester Strode (bullpen); 3 Alan Trammell (bench)

== Player stats ==
=== Batting ===
Note: G = Games played; AB = At bats; H = Hits; Avg. = Batting average; HR = Home runs; RBI = Runs batted in

Player	G	AB	H	Avg.	HR	RBI
Derrek Lee	155	623	181	.291	20	90
Alfonso Soriano	109	453	127	.280	29	75
Ryan Theriot	149	580	178	.307	1	38
Aramis Ramírez	149	554	160	.289	27	111
Mark DeRosa	149	505	144	.285	21	87
Kosuke Fukudome	150	501	129	.257	10	58
Geovany Soto	141	494	141	.285	23	86
Reed Johnson	109	333	101	.303	6	50
Jim Edmonds	85	250	64	.256	19	49
Mike Fontenot	119	243	74	.305	9	40
Ronny Cedeño	99	216	58	.269	2	28
Henry Blanco	58	120	35	.292	3	12
Daryle Ward	89	102	22	.216	4	17
Félix Pie	43	83	20	.241	1	10
Micah Hoffpauir	33	73	25	.342	2	8
Matt Murton	19	40	10	.250	0	6
Eric Patterson	13	38	9	.237	1	7
Casey McGehee	9	24	4	.167	0	5
Koyie Hill	10	21	2	.095	0	1
Pitcher totals	161	335	68	.203	6	33
Team totals	161	5588	1552	.278	184	811

=== Pitching ===
Note: W = Wins; L = Losses; ERA = Earned run average; G = Games pitched; GS = Games started; SV = Saves; IP = Innings pitched; R = Runs allowed; ER = Earned runs allowed; BB = Walks allowed; K = Strikeouts

Player	W	L	ERA	G	GS	SV	IP	R	ER	BB	K
José Ascanio	0	0	7.94	6	0	0	5.2	5	5	4	3
Neal Cotts	0	2	4.29	50	0	0	35.2	17	17	13	43
Ryan Dempster	17	6	2.96	33	33	0	206.2	75	68	76	187
Scott Eyre	2	0	7.15	19	0	0	11.1	9	9	4	14
Chad Fox	0	1	5.40	3	0	0	3.1	2	2	3	1
Sean Gallagher	3	4	4.45	12	10	0	58.2	31	29	22	49
Chad Gaudin	4	2	6.26	24	0	0	27.1	20	19	10	27
Ángel Guzmán	0	0	5.59	6	1	0	9.2	6	6	4	10
Rich Harden	5	1	1.77	12	12	0	71.0	15	14	30	89
Kevin Hart	2	2	6.51	21	0	0	27.2	24	20	18	23
Rich Hill	1	0	4.12	5	5	0	19.2	9	9	18	15
Bob Howry	7	5	5.35	72	0	1	70.2	44	42	13	59
Jon Lieber	2	3	4.05	26	1	0	46.2	24	21	6	27
Ted Lilly	17	9	4.09	34	34	0	204.2	97	93	64	184
Carlos Mármol	2	4	2.68	82	0	7	87.1	30	26	41	114
Jason Marquis	11	9	4.53	29	28	0	167.0	88	84	70	91
Sean Marshall	3	5	3.86	34	7	1	65.1	29	28	23	58
Carmen Pignatiello	0	0	13.50	2	0	0	0.2	1	1	2	0
Jeff Samardzija	1	0	2.28	26	0	1	27.2	7	7	15	25
Randy Wells	0	0	0.00	3	0	0	4.1	0	0	2	1
Kerry Wood	5	4	3.26	65	0	34	66.1	25	24	18	84
Michael Wuertz	1	1	3.63	45	0	0	44.2	23	18	20	30
Carlos Zambrano	14	6	3.91	30	30	0	188.2	88	82	72	130
Team totals	97	64	3.87	161	161	44	1450.2	669	624	548	1264

== 2007 post-season changes ==
=== Trades ===
November 12, 2007	To Detroit Tigers Jacque Jones	To Chicago Cubs Omar Infante
November 13, 2007	To Minnesota Twins Craig Monroe	To Chicago Cubs Clay Rapada
December 4, 2007	To Atlanta Braves Will Ohman; Omar Infante	To Chicago Cubs José Ascanio
December 6, 2007	To Tampa Bay Rays Cash considerations	To Chicago Cubs Tim Lahey
January 5, 2008	To New York Mets Ángel Pagán	To Chicago Cubs Ryan Meyers; Corey Coles
July 8, 2008	To Oakland Athletics Sean Gallagher; Matt Murton; Eric Patterson; Josh Donaldson	To Chicago Cubs Rich Harden; Chad Gaudin

=== Free agent acquisitions ===
Player	Former team	Contract Terms
Kosuke Fukudome	Chunichi Dragons	4 years, $48 million
Jon Lieber	Philadelphia Phillies	1 year, $3.5 million
Reed Johnson	Toronto Blue Jays	1 year, $1.3 million
Jim Edmonds	San Diego Padres	1 year, $280,000

=== Players lost to free agency ===
Player	New team
Jason Kendall	Milwaukee Brewers
Cliff Floyd	Tampa Bay Rays
Mark Prior	San Diego Padres
Steve Trachsel	Baltimore Orioles
Wade Miller	Toronto Blue Jays

=== Other news ===
- On November 20, 2007, John McDonough stepped down as team president to join the Chicago Blackhawks.
- On April 23, 2008, the Chicago Cubs recorded their 10,000th victory in franchise history with a 7-6 victory in 10 innings over the Colorado Rockies. They were just the second team to complete this feat behind the San Francisco Giants.
- On September 14, 2008 Carlos Zambrano threw the first no-hitter for the Cubs since Milt Pappas threw his on September 2, 1972. Zambrano threw the no-hitter against the Houston Astros in a game played at Miller Park in Milwaukee. It was the first no-hitter recorded at a neutral site in baseball history. The game was moved due to the damage Hurricane Ike caused.

== Farm system ==
Level	Team	League	Manager
AAA	Iowa Cubs	Pacific Coast League	Pat Listach
AA	Tennessee Smokies	Southern League	Buddy Bailey
A	Daytona Cubs	Florida State League	Jody Davis
A	Peoria Chiefs	Midwest League	Ryne Sandberg
A-Short Season	Boise Hawks	Northwest League	Tom Beyers
Rookie	AZL Cubs	Arizona League	Franklin Font

LEAGUE CHAMPIONS: Daytona
