= Matt Murton =

American baseball player (born 1981)

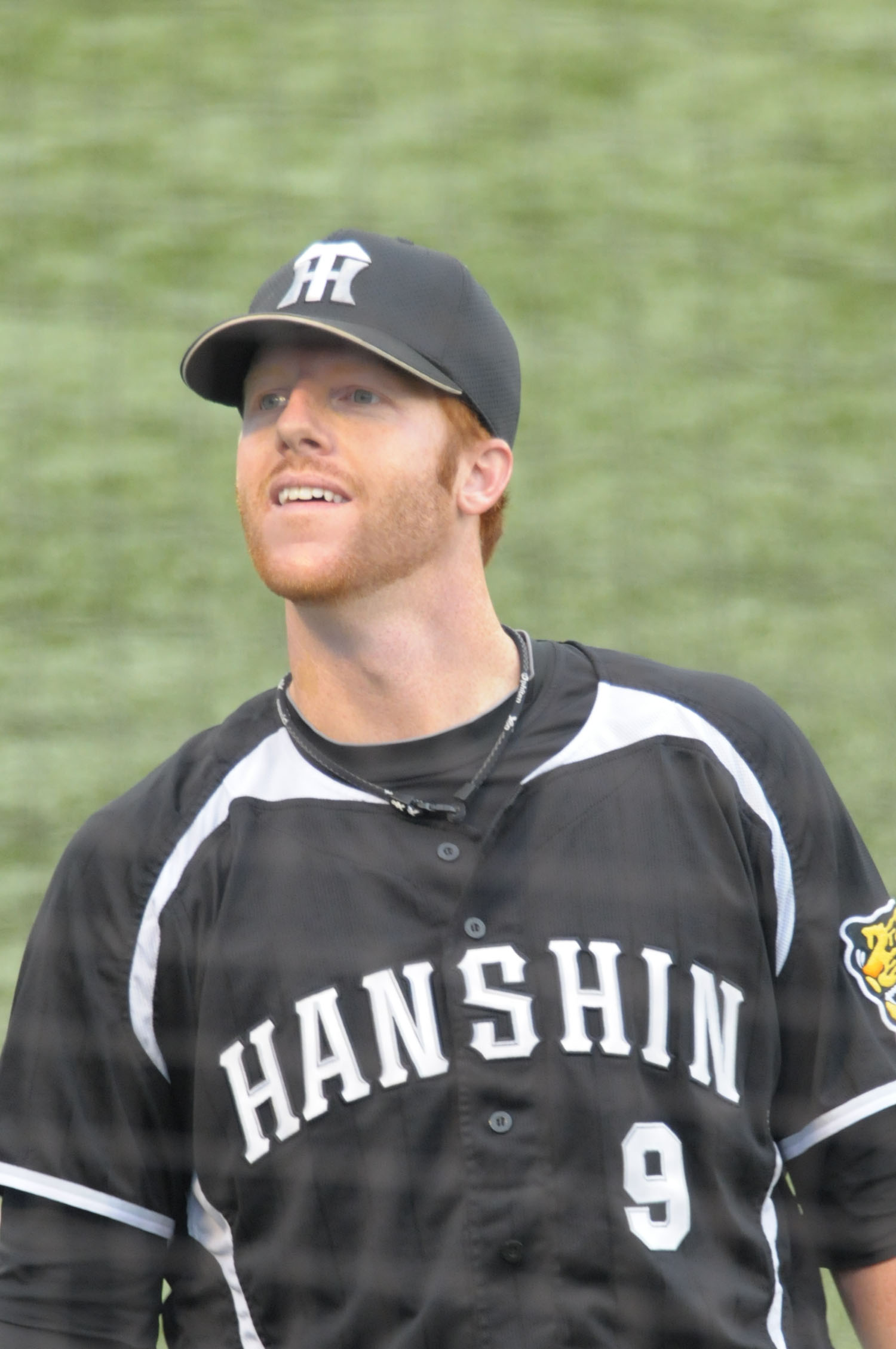
- Murton with the Hanshin Tigers in 2012
- Outfielder
- Born: October 3, 1981 (age 44); Fort Lauderdale, Florida, U.S.
- Batted: Right Threw: Right

Professional debut
- MLB: July 8, 2005, for the Chicago Cubs
- NPB: March 26, 2010, for the Hanshin Tigers

Last appearance
- MLB: October 4, 2009, for the Colorado Rockies
- NPB: October 4, 2015, for the Hanshin Tigers

MLB statistics
- Batting average: .286
- Home runs: 29
- Runs batted in: 112

NPB statistics
- Batting average: .310
- Home runs: 77
- Runs batted in: 417
- Stats at Baseball Reference

Teams
- Chicago Cubs (2005–2008); Oakland Athletics (2008); Colorado Rockies (2009); Hanshin Tigers (2010–2015)

Career highlights and awards
- 4× Best Nine Award (2010, 2011, 2013, 2014); 4× NPB All-Star (2010, 2011, 2013, 2014); CL Batting champion (2014)

Matthew Henry Murton (born October 3, 1981) is an American former professional baseball outfielder. He played in Major League Baseball (MLB) for the Chicago Cubs, Oakland Athletics, and Colorado Rockies. Murton also played in Nippon Professional Baseball (NPB) for the Hanshin Tigers.

== Baseball career ==
=== Amateur ===
In 2001 and 2002, Murton played collegiate summer baseball for the Wareham Gatemen of the Cape Cod Baseball League (CCBL). Murton led the Gatemen to the league title in both seasons, being named the league's MVP in 2001, and in 2002 batting .400 and winning the league's all-star home run derby. He was inducted into the CCBL Hall of Fame in 2008.

=== Boston Red Sox ===
Murton was drafted out of Georgia Tech baseball in the supplemental first round of the 2003 MLB draft by the Boston Red Sox. Murton played a total of 155 games in the Red Sox organization for the Lowell Spinners and the Sarasota Red Sox.

=== Chicago Cubs ===
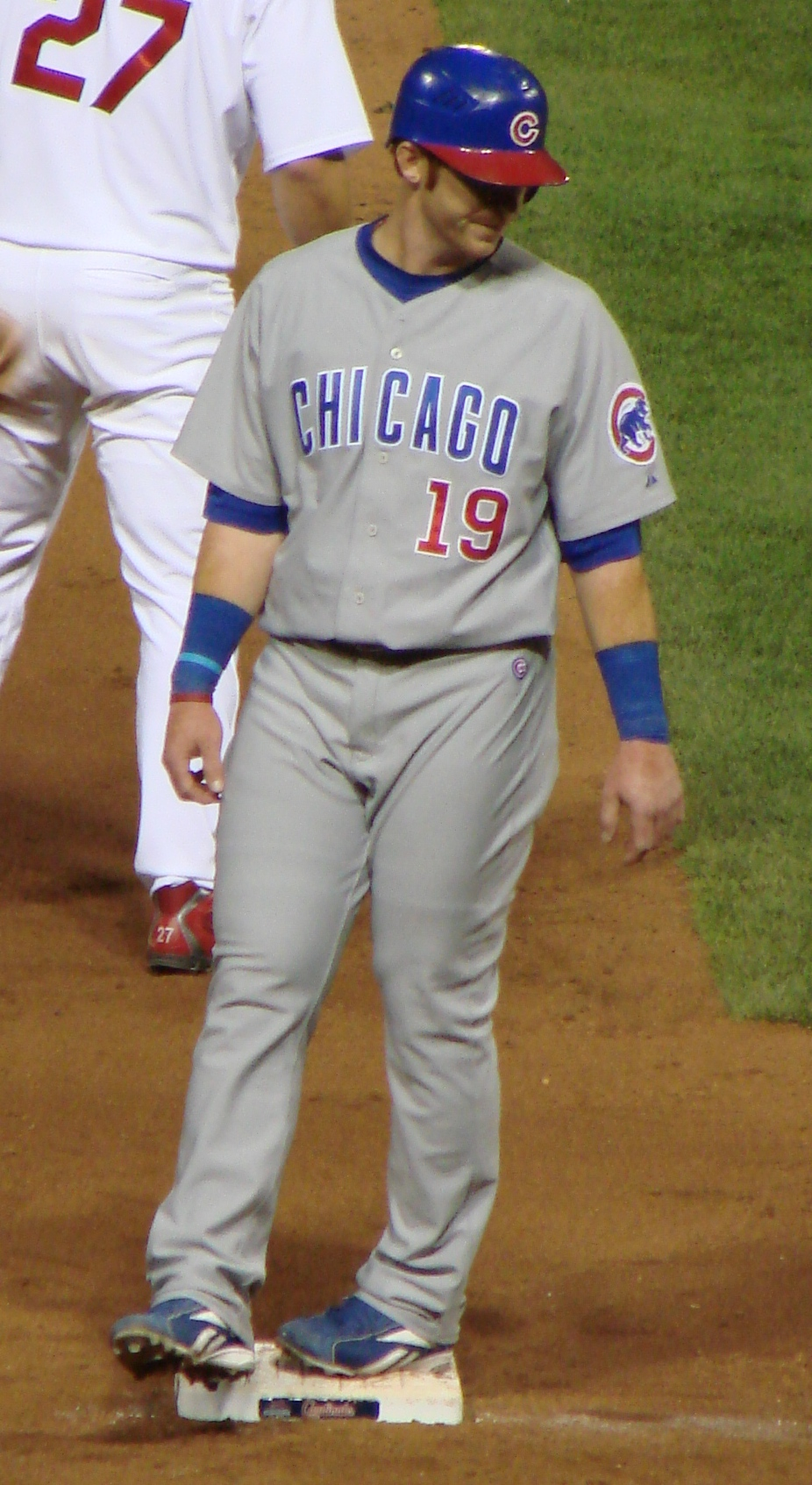
Murton with the Cubs

Murton was acquired at the 2004 trading deadline by the Chicago Cubs along with Red Sox star shortstop and fellow former Georgia Tech Yellow Jacket Nomar Garciaparra as part of a four-team blockbuster deal. He spent the rest of the year with the Class A-Advanced Daytona Cubs.

He started 2005 with the Double-A West Tenn Diamond Jaxx, but was called up to the major leagues for the first time on July 8, along with Adam Greenberg, to replace the struggling Corey Patterson and Jason Dubois. On the same day, he went 2-for-2 with a walk and a sacrifice fly against the Florida Marlins in his major league debut. He continued his success in the majors over the rest of the season, hitting .321 with two stolen bases, seven home runs, and an on-base percentage of .386 in 51 games in 2005.

In 2006, Murton became the Cubs' starting left fielder. On August 3, 2006, Murton went 4-for-4 with 4 doubles and 5 RBIs in game 2 of a doubleheader against the Arizona Diamondbacks, matching a major league record for doubles in a single game. He finished the year with the second-highest mark on the team in batting average, at .297, with 13 home runs and 62 runs batted in.

For 2007, Murton saw his playing time reduced when the Cubs signed Cliff Floyd to play in left field. When center fielder Alfonso Soriano switched back to left field in April, Murton switched to right field. On June 13, after hitting only one home run with eight RBIs in limited playing time, Murton was optioned to Triple-A to make room for left-handed pitcher Clay Rapada.

On July 27, 2007, Murton was called back up to the major leagues, along with pitcher Rocky Cherry, with his first start coming on July 30.

In 2008, Murton saw his playing time diminish even further, playing in just nineteen games, and recording only 42 plate appearances in the first three months of the season for the Cubs. In those 42 plate appearances, he managed only two hits, and spent most of the first half of the season in the minors.

=== Oakland Athletics ===
On July 8, 2008, Murton was traded along with Cubs prospects Josh Donaldson, Eric Patterson, and Sean Gallagher to the Oakland Athletics for pitchers Rich Harden and Chad Gaudin.

=== Colorado Rockies ===
On February 4, 2009, Murton was traded to the Colorado Rockies for infielder Corey Wimberly. When stepping to the plate at Rockies home games, the song "Strong Tower" by Kutless was played over the speaker system.

=== Hanshin Tigers ===
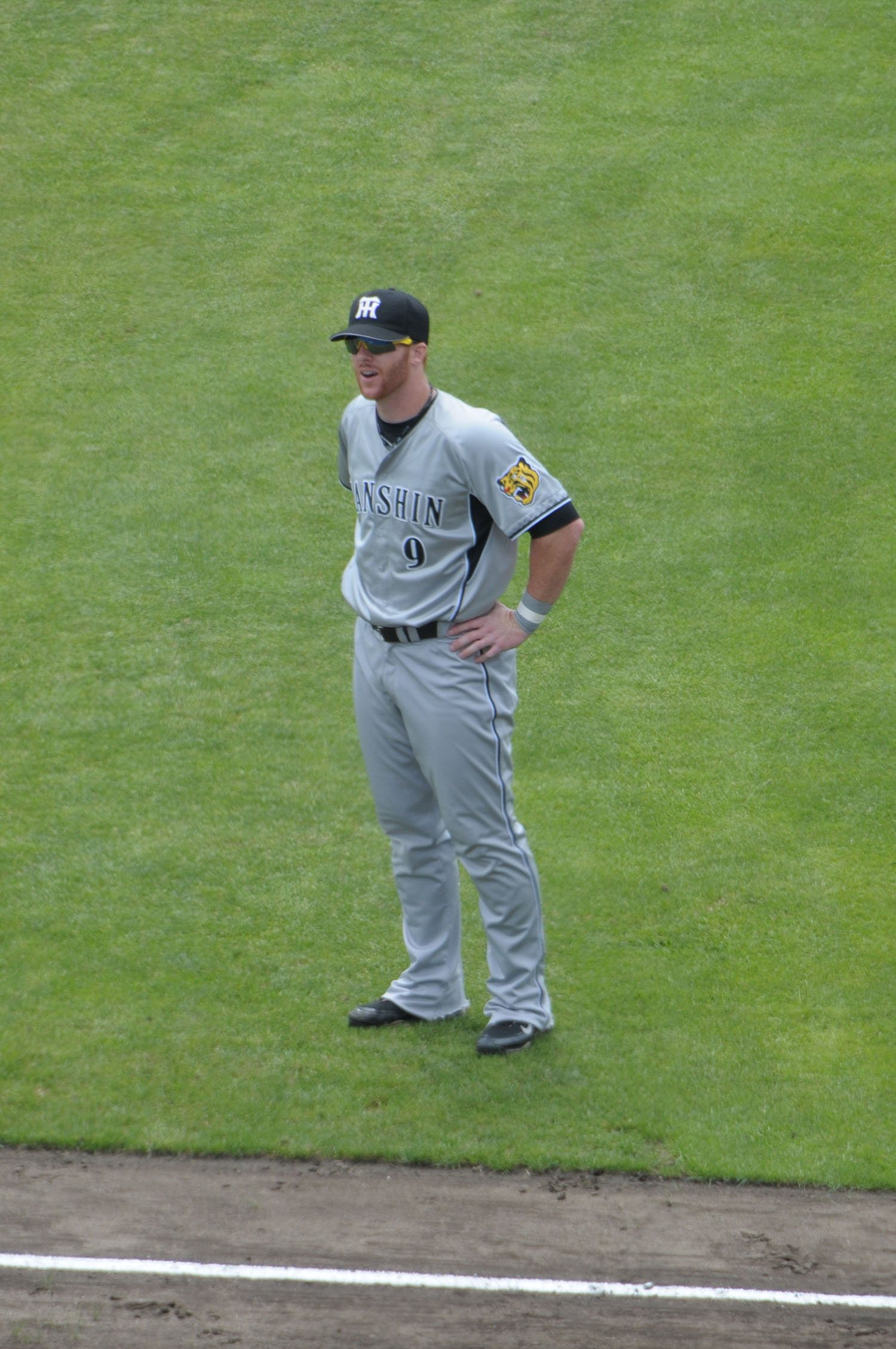
Murton with the Hanshin Tigers

On December 4, 2009, Murton was released by the Rockies, who sold his contract to the Hanshin Tigers of Japan's Nippon Professional Baseball.

In Murton's rookie season with the Hanshin Tigers he became only the fourth player in Nippon Professional Baseball history to have a 200-hit season. On October 5, 2010, Murton broke the NPB single- season hit record of 210, set by Ichiro Suzuki in 1994 (in 130 games), getting his 211th hit in game #142. He finished his first season in Japan with 214 hits, a .349 batting average, 17 home runs and 91 RBIs.

Murton's single-season hits record was eclipsed in 2015 by Shogo Akiyama of the Seibu Lions, who recorded 216 hits in 143 games.

Murton played six seasons for the Hanshin Tigers, with a .310 career batting average and 1,020 hits. In 2015, Murton became the 16th foreign player to achieve 1,000 career hits in NPB.

=== Chicago Cubs ===
On February 16, 2016, Murton returned to MLB and signed a minor league contract with the Chicago Cubs organization. In 76 games for the Triple–A Iowa Cubs, he batted .314/.349/.398 with two home runs and 37 RBI. Murton elected free agency following the season on November 7.

=== Detroit Tigers ===
On February 20, 2017, Murton signed a minor league contract with the Detroit Tigers. The Tigers released him on April 18, 2017.

== Post-playing career ==
On March 9, 2018, Murton retired and became an assistant in the Chicago Cubs front office.

On February 5, 2024, the Philadelphia Phillies announced Murton would serve as a minor league hitting advisor.
