= Harrison High School (Georgia) =

Public high school in Georgia, US

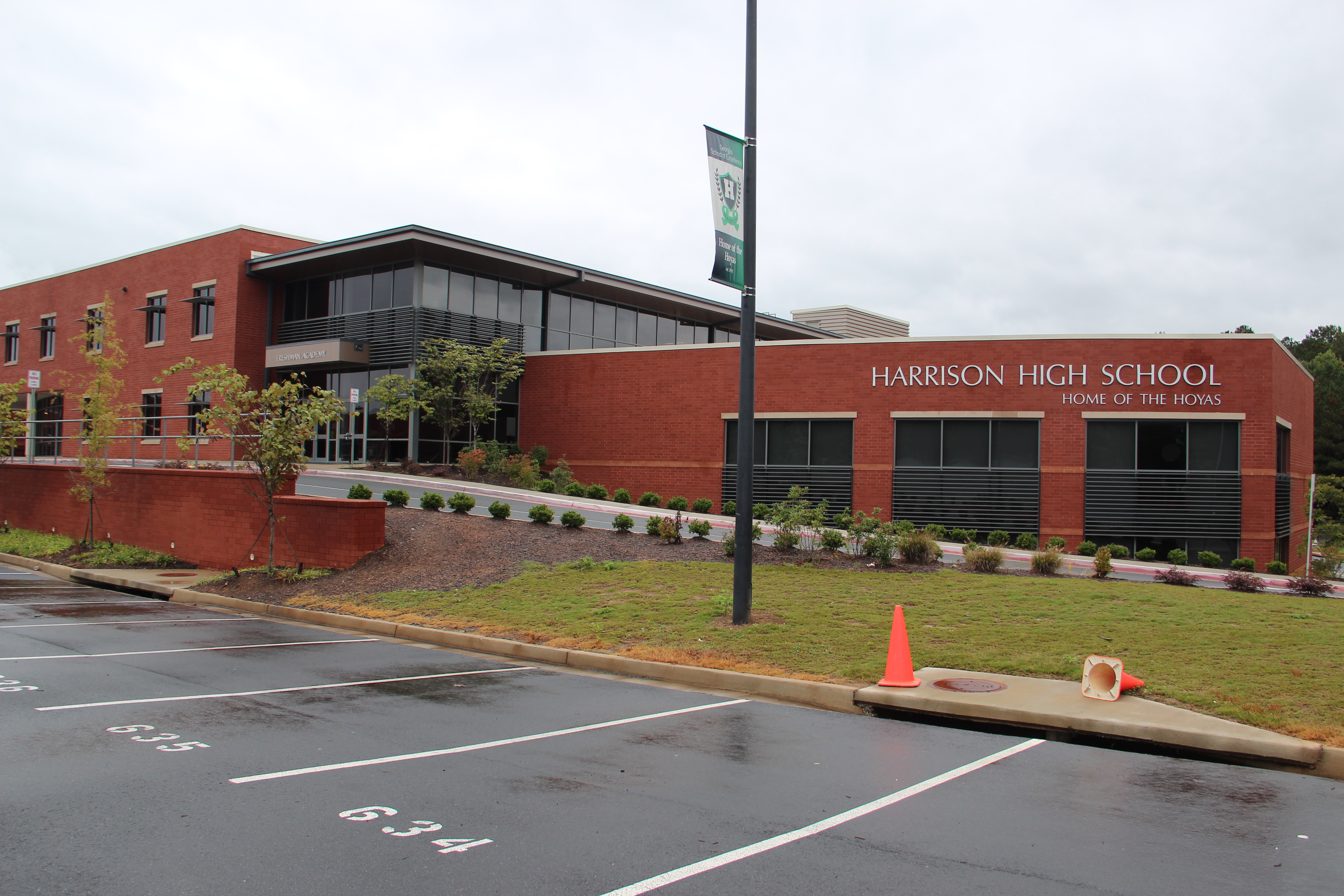

Location
- 4500 Due West Road; Kennesaw, Georgia 30152; United States; 33°58′01″N 84°40′59″W

Information
- Type: Public
- Established: 1991; 35 years ago
- School district: Cobb County School District
- Principal: Dr. Jeff Milton
- Staff: 112.70 (FTE)
- Grades: 9–12
- Enrollment: 2,170 (2023–2024)
- Student to teacher ratio: 19.25
- Colors: Kelly green, white, and navy
- Nickname: Hoyas
- Website: https://www.cobbk12.org/harrison

Carl Harrison High School, commonly known simply Harrison, is a grades 9–12 public high school in unincorporated Cobb County, Georgia, United States, with a Kennesaw post office address.

== History ==
The school was named for Carl J. Harrison, a member of the Cobb County Board of Education, a member of the Georgia House of Representatives, elected in 1975, and later a Senator in the Georgia State Senate, elected in 1983.

The 2011 movie,The 5th Quarter, was based on true events that occurred in 2006, in which a member of Harrison High School's Football team was killed in a car accident due to careless driving from classmates.

== Sports and clubs ==
=== Music ===
The Harrison High School Marching Band took part in the Macy's Thanksgiving Day Parade in 2009 and 2016.

== Notable alumni ==
- Darvin Adams (2008) – Canadian Football League (CFL) wide receiver
- Joe Bendik – Major League Soccer (MLS) goalkeeper
- Bradford Cox – Rock Musician (Deerhunter and Atlas Sound) and Actor (Dropped Out)
- Adam Everett (1995) – Major League Baseball (MLB) player
- Justin Fields (2018) – National Football League (NFL) quarterback
- Paul Oliver (2003) – NFL safety
- Corey Patterson (1998) – MLB player
- Eric Patterson (2001) – MLB player
- Brian Rogers (2000) – MLB relief pitcher
- Ollie Schniederjans – PGA Tour and Korn Ferry Tour golfer
- Ali Vitali – journalist, television analyst
- Andrew Wilson (2000) – college basketball coach
