= Don Patterson (defensive back) =

American football player (born 1957)

No. 43, 21
- Position: Cornerback

Personal information
- Born: October 31, 1957 (age 69); Gray, Georgia, U.S.
- Listed height: 5 ft 11 in (1.80 m)
- Listed weight: 175 lb (79 kg)

Career information
- High school: Jones County (Gray)
- College: Georgia Tech
- NFL draft: 1979: undrafted

Career history
- Atlanta Falcons (1979)*; Detroit Lions (1979); New York Giants (1980); New Orleans Saints (1981)*
- * Offseason or practice squad member only

Career NFL statistics
- Games played: 5
- Stats at Pro Football Reference

Don Patterson (born October 31, 1957) is an American former professional football player who was a cornerback for two seasons with the Detroit Lions and New York Giants of the National Football League (NFL). He played college football for the Georgia Tech Yellow Jackets.

His sons, Eric Patterson and Corey Patterson are both former Major League Baseball outfielders. Eric played for the Chicago Cubs, Oakland Athletics, Boston Red Sox, and the San Diego Padres. Corey played for the Cubs, Baltimore Orioles, Cincinnati Reds, Washington Nationals, Milwaukee Brewers, Toronto Blue Jays, and the St. Louis Cardinals.
