= Eric Patterson (baseball) =

American baseball player (born 1983)

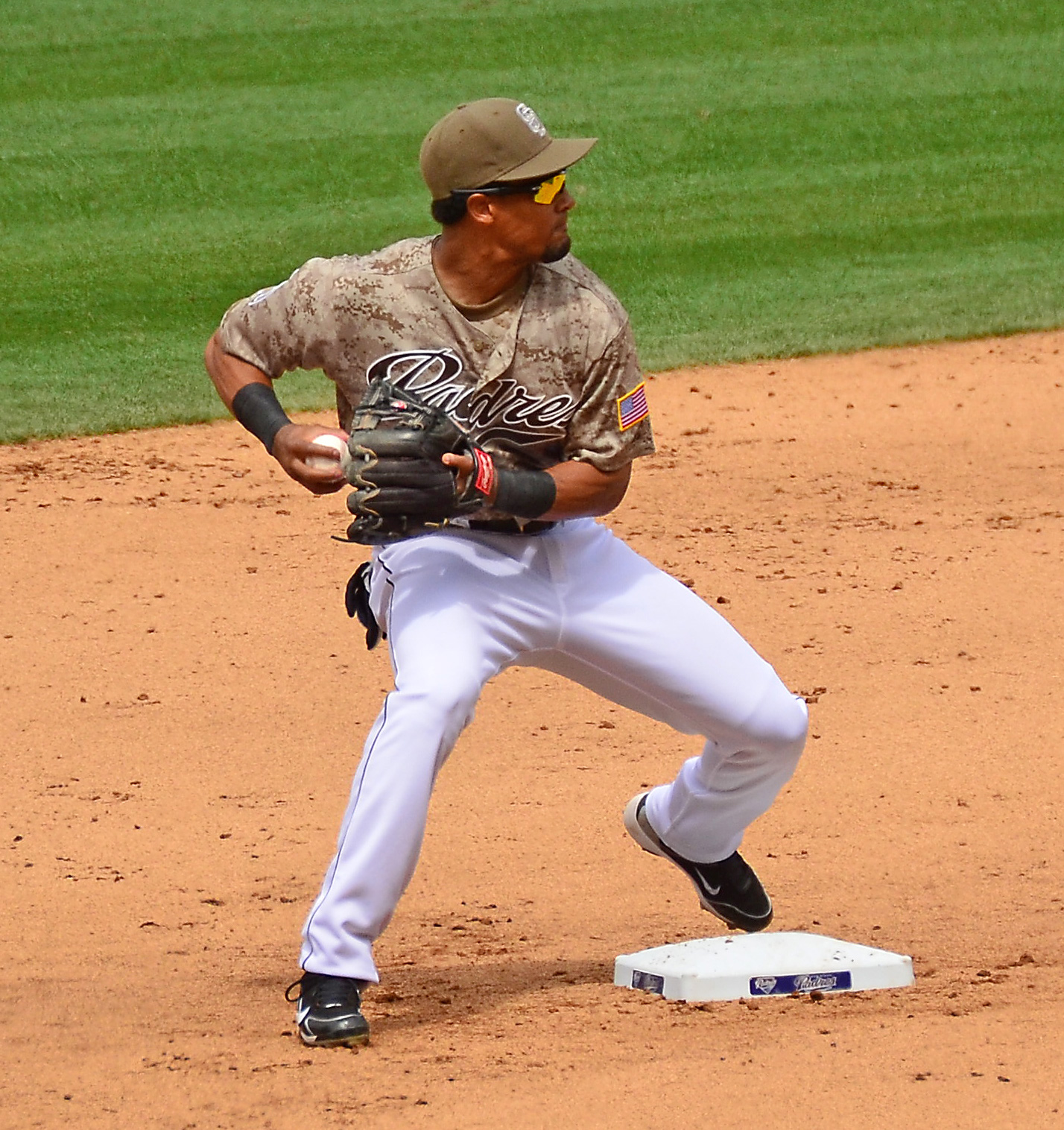
- Patterson with the San Diego Padres in 2011
- Left fielder / Second baseman
- Born: April 8, 1983 (age 43); Tallahassee, Florida, U.S.
- Batted: Left Threw: Right

MLB debut
- August 6, 2007, for the Chicago Cubs

Last MLB appearance
- June 8, 2011, for the San Diego Padres

MLB statistics
- Batting average: .217
- Home runs: 10
- Runs batted in: 50
- Stats at Baseball Reference

Teams
- Chicago Cubs (2007–2008); Oakland Athletics (2008–2010); Boston Red Sox (2010); San Diego Padres (2011)
Medals
Men's baseball
Representing United States
Pan American Games
Silver medal – second place	2003 Santo Domingo	Team

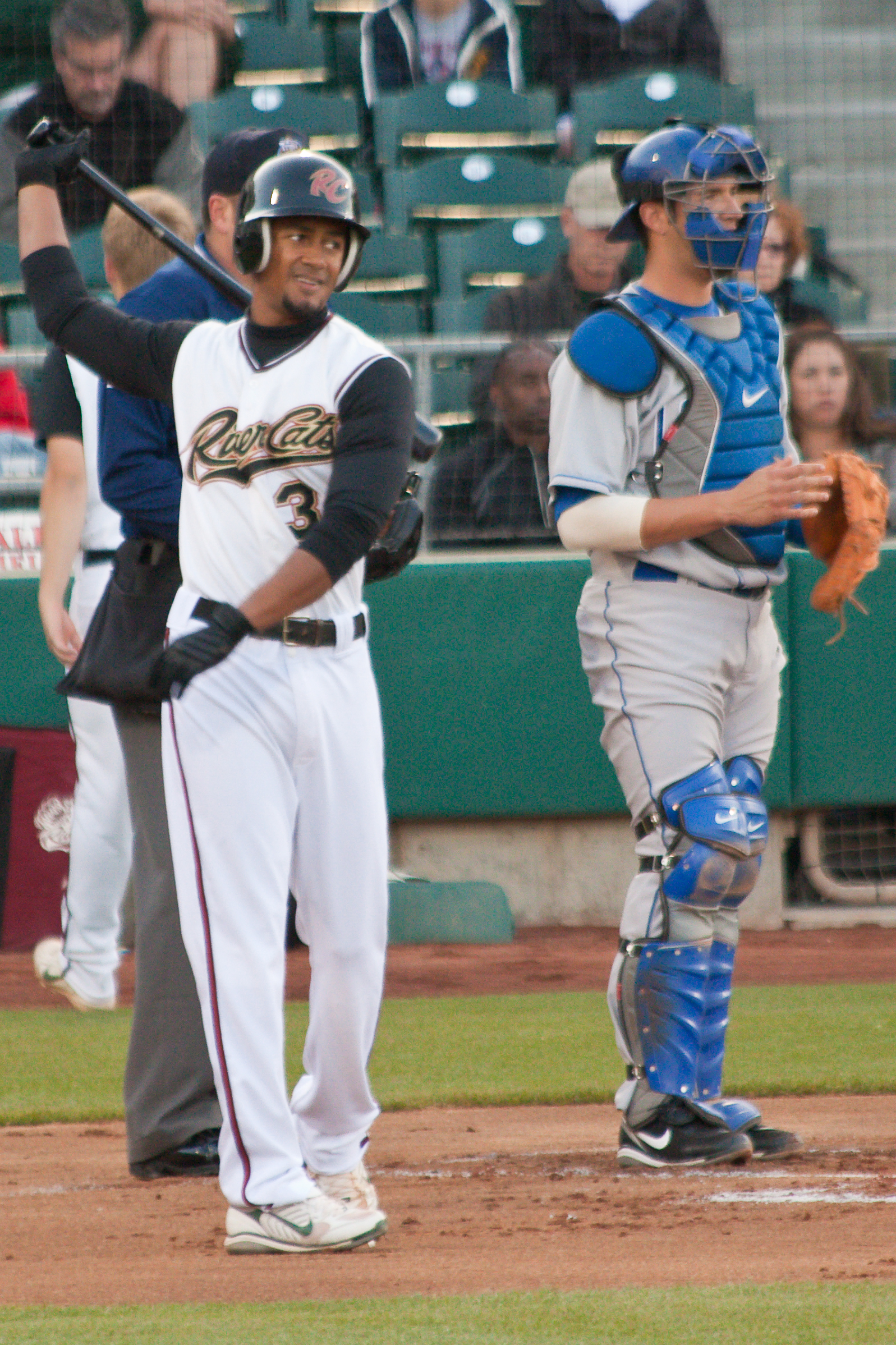
Patterson (left) batting for the Sacramento River Cats, Triple-A affiliates of the Oakland Athletics, in 2009

Eric Scott Patterson (born April 8, 1983) is an American former professional baseball left fielder and second baseman. He played in Major League Baseball (MLB) for the Chicago Cubs, Oakland Athletics, Boston Red Sox, and San Diego Padres. He is currently the manager for the Indianapolis Indians, the Triple-A affiliate of the Pittsburgh Pirates.

== Baseball career ==
=== Amateur ===
Although Patterson originally was drafted by the Colorado Rockies in the 23rd round of the 2001 MLB draft out of Harrison High School in Kennesaw, Georgia, he did not sign and went on instead to attend the Georgia Institute of Technology. With the Yellow Jackets, Patterson was named an Atlantic Coast Conference All-Star three times (2002–2004) and an All-American twice (in 2002 on the Freshman 1st Team, and in 2004 on the 3rd team). He was named to the USA Baseball team twice, in 2002 and 2003.

=== Chicago Cubs ===
Patterson was selected in the 8th round of the 2004 MLB draft by the Chicago Cubs.

Patterson played in the 2006 All-Star Futures Game in Pittsburgh, and was ranked the sixth-best prospect in the Cubs organization by Baseball America prior to the 2007 season. Patterson made his MLB debut with the Chicago Cubs on August 6, 2007. He collected his first major league hit on August 7, by singling against Woody Williams in a game against the Houston Astros. On June 22, 2008, Patterson hit the first home run of his career.

=== Oakland Athletics ===
On July 8, 2008, Patterson was traded along with pitcher Sean Gallagher, outfielder Matt Murton, and catcher Josh Donaldson to the Oakland Athletics in exchange for pitchers Rich Harden and Chad Gaudin.

On June 22, 2010, Patterson was designated for assignment to make way for Coco Crisp on the A's roster.

=== Boston Red Sox ===
On June 26, 2010, Patterson was traded to the Boston Red Sox for pitcher Fabian Williamson, after Dustin Pedroia was placed on the disabled list having sustained a nondisplaced fracture of the navicular bone on his left foot. He played a career-high 90 games in 2010, split equally between Oakland and Boston.

=== San Diego Padres ===
On December 16, 2010, Patterson was traded to the San Diego Padres to complete the deal that sent Adrián González to the Boston Red Sox for Casey Kelly, Anthony Rizzo, and Reymond Fuentes. He was designated for assignment on June 9. He was released by San Diego on December 15, 2011.

=== Detroit Tigers ===
On December 16, 2011, Patterson signed a minor league contract with the Detroit Tigers. In 64 appearances for the Triple-A Toledo Mud Hens, he batted .244/.365/.317 with two home runs, 23 RBI, and 13 stolen bases. Patterson was released by the Tigers organization on June 17, 2012.

=== York Revolution ===
Patterson began the 2013 season with the York Revolution of the Atlantic League of Professional Baseball.

=== Milwaukee Brewers ===
On July 12, 2013, the Milwaukee Brewers signed Patterson and assigned him to their Triple-A affiliate, the Nashville Sounds.

=== Chicago White Sox ===
On January 10, 2014, Patterson signed a minor league contract with the Chicago White Sox organization. He was released prior to the start of the season on March 20.

=== York Revolution (second stint) ===
Patterson signed with the York Revolution of the Atlantic League of Professional Baseball for the 2015 season. He became a free agent after the 2015 season.

== Coaching career ==
=== Chicago Cubs organization ===
Patterson was named hitting coach of the Iowa Cubs, the Triple-A affiliate of the Chicago Cubs, for the 2023 season. He was named as Iowa's bench coach for the 2024 season.

=== Pittsburgh Pirates organization ===
On January 31, 2025, the Pittsburgh Pirates hired Patterson to serve as the bench coach for their Triple-A affiliate, the Indianapolis Indians. In 2026, Patterson was named as the manager of the Indianapolis Indians the Pirates Triple-A affiliate.

== Personal life ==
Patterson's older brother—Corey, also drafted by the Cubs—was also an outfielder in the MLB. His father, Don, was a defensive back for two years in the National Football League (NFL).
