= Rich Harden =

Canadian baseball player (born 1981)

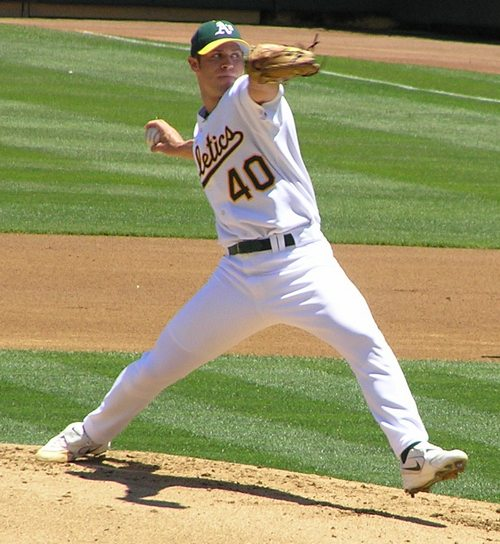
- Harden with the Oakland Athletics
- Pitcher
- Born: November 30, 1981 (age 44); Victoria, British Columbia, Canada
- Batted: Left Threw: Right

MLB debut
- July 21, 2003, for the Oakland Athletics

Last MLB appearance
- September 25, 2011, for the Oakland Athletics

MLB statistics
- Win–loss record: 59–38
- Earned run average: 3.76
- Strikeouts: 949
- Stats at Baseball Reference

Teams
- Oakland Athletics (2003–2008); Chicago Cubs (2008–2009); Texas Rangers (2010); Oakland Athletics (2011)

Member of the Canadian

Baseball Hall of Fame
- Induction: 2023

James Richard Harden (born November 30, 1981) is a Canadian former professional baseball pitcher. He pitched for the Oakland Athletics, Chicago Cubs, and Texas Rangers of Major League Baseball.

== Early years ==
Harden attended Claremont Secondary School in Victoria, British Columbia. He was a childhood friend and neighbor of Olympic diver Riley McCormick. Harden was drafted by the Seattle Mariners in the 38th round of the 1999 Major League Baseball draft, but instead attended Central Arizona College, from where he graduated in 2001. While there he played baseball alongside future MLB All-Star second baseman Ian Kinsler.

He led all NJCAA Division I pitchers with 127 strikeouts in 2001, and his ERA of 2.14 was the 5th lowest in the nation. In his first professional season as a 19-year-old with the Vancouver Canadians in Single-A, Harden had a 2–4 record in 18 games (14 starts), a 3.39 ERA, allowed only 47 hits and struck out 100 batters in 74 innings.

== Professional career ==
=== Draft and minor leagues ===
Harden was drafted by the Athletics in the 17th round of the 2000 Major League Baseball draft, and signed by the team on May 28, 2001, shortly after graduating.

In 2002, Harden began the year with the Single-A Visalia Oaks of the California League and was very impressive in 12 starts, as he had a 4–3 record with an ERA of 2.91, and struck out 85 batters in 68 innings. Halfway through the 2002 season, Harden was promoted to the Double-A Midland RockHounds of the Texas League, where he continued his impressive season, earning a record of 8–3, with an ERA of 2.95 in 16 starts. He also struck out 102 batters in 85 innings. His combined 2002 stats were 12–6, 2.93 ERA, 187 strikeouts and 75 walks in 153 innings.

Harden began the 2003 season with Midland, and in 2 games, he had a 2–0 record and pitched 13 perfect innings, striking out 17 along the way. He was then promoted to the Triple-A Sacramento River Cats of the Pacific Coast League, where he pitched very well. In 16 games, 14 of which he started, Harden went 9–4 with an ERA of 3.15. Overall, Harden finished with a combined 11–4 record, 2.74 ERA, 107 strikeouts and 35 walks in 102 innings in the minor leagues during the 2003 season. He was then promoted to the Oakland Athletics in July 2003.

=== Oakland Athletics (2003–2008) ===
Harden made his major league debut on July 21, 2003, against the Kansas City Royals. He held the Royals to only one run on four hits in seven innings, earning a no decision. Through Harden's first five starts, he had a 3–1 record, with an ERA of 1.69. In his next two, he allowed six runs in four innings against the Toronto Blue Jays on August 21, and then eight runs in 2.2 innings on August 26 against the Boston Red Sox. He finished the season with a 5–4 record and an ERA of 4.46. Harden pitched in two games in relief with the Athletics in their Division Series matchup with the Red Sox. In his playoff debut on October 1, Harden earned the win, pitching a scoreless inning. However in his second appearance, he pitched only 1/3 of an inning, and allowed two runs and was tagged with the loss.

Harden began the 2004 season with the Sacramento River Cats, coming out of spring training as the A's 5th starter. But the Athletics had two off days in the first eight days of the season, and they optioned him down to get a start in the minor leagues. He pitched in one game, losing 5–3 to the Edmonton Trappers. The Athletics called him up on April 10, and he put together a very solid season with an 11–7 record and an ERA of 3.99. Harden compiled an 8–2 record and an ERA of 3.49 after the All-Star break. He ranked 8th in the AL with 167 strikeouts, and was tied for 7th with 81 walks. Harden allowed just 16 home runs in 189.2 innings, an average of 0.76 per nine innings, which was tied for 4th lowest in the American League. He threw the fastest fastball of all major league starters, averaging 94.3 miles per hour.

In 2005, Harden began the season with the Athletics, but was sidelined with an oblique injury, and missed more than a month. Harden came back and pitched a two-hit game against the Texas Rangers on July 14, in which he allowed no runs for 7+ innings. One month later on August 14, Harden allowed only one hit, but received a no decision, en route to a 2–1 loss against the Minnesota Twins. On August 19, Harden had a 10–5 record with an ERA of 2.63, until he injured his right shoulder, sidelining him until September 25, by which time the Athletics were already out of the playoff hunt. Harden appeared in three games late in the season, pitching 5 innings of shutout ball, striking out seven and walking one. He finished the year with a 10–5 win–loss record, an ERA of 2.57 and 121 strikeouts in 128 innings. He allowed only seven HR's all season long, and despite the injuries, he emerged as the ace of the Oakland Athletics pitching staff.

In 2006, Harden had two lengthy stints on the DL, spending most of the season there. He came back from the DL on September 21, 2006, for a short but outstanding start, going 3 innings allowing a run and recording 7 strikeouts, while finishing the season with a 4–0 record.

He started off the 2007 season with a win against the Seattle Mariners, going 7 innings, striking out 7, and allowing two walks and two hits, before returning to the DL, on April 23.

After another injury-plagued season, Harden started off the 2008 season with a strong start against the Boston Red Sox, pitching six strong innings and giving up a run and three hits while walking three and striking out nine batters. However, after his second start, he was again placed on the disabled list. Harden was activated on May 11 and struggled in his return allowing 8 hits and 5 runs in 3.2 innings and earning a no decision. In Harden's next start against his former teammate Tim Hudson and the Atlanta Braves, he pitched 7 innings only allowing 4 hits and a run while earning the win. In this start against the Braves on May 17, Harden also achieved his first major league hit.

On June 8, 2008, he became the 38th major-league pitcher to throw an immaculate inning, strike out all three batters on nine total pitches, occurring in the first inning of a game against the Los Angeles Angels of Anaheim.

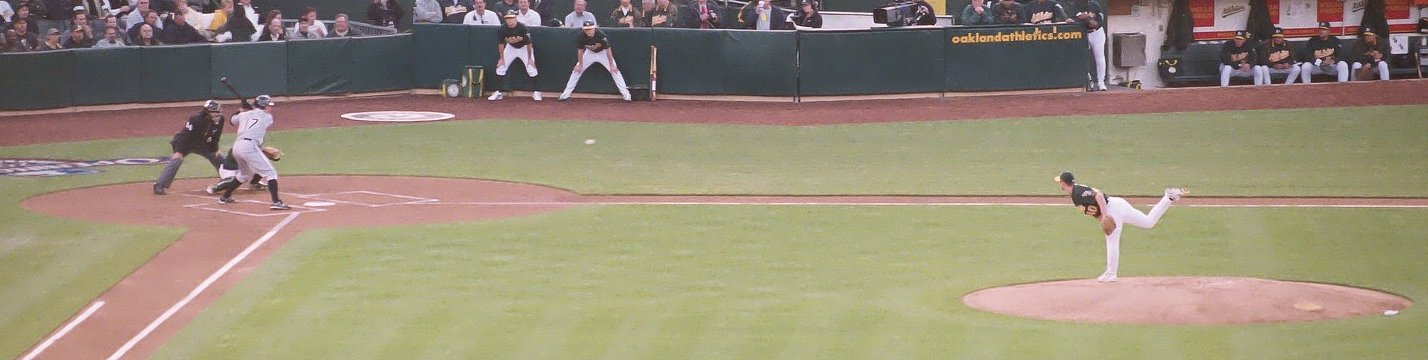
Rich Harden pitches to Darin Erstad of the Chicago White Sox during Oakland's home opener, 2007.

=== Chicago Cubs (2008–2009) ===
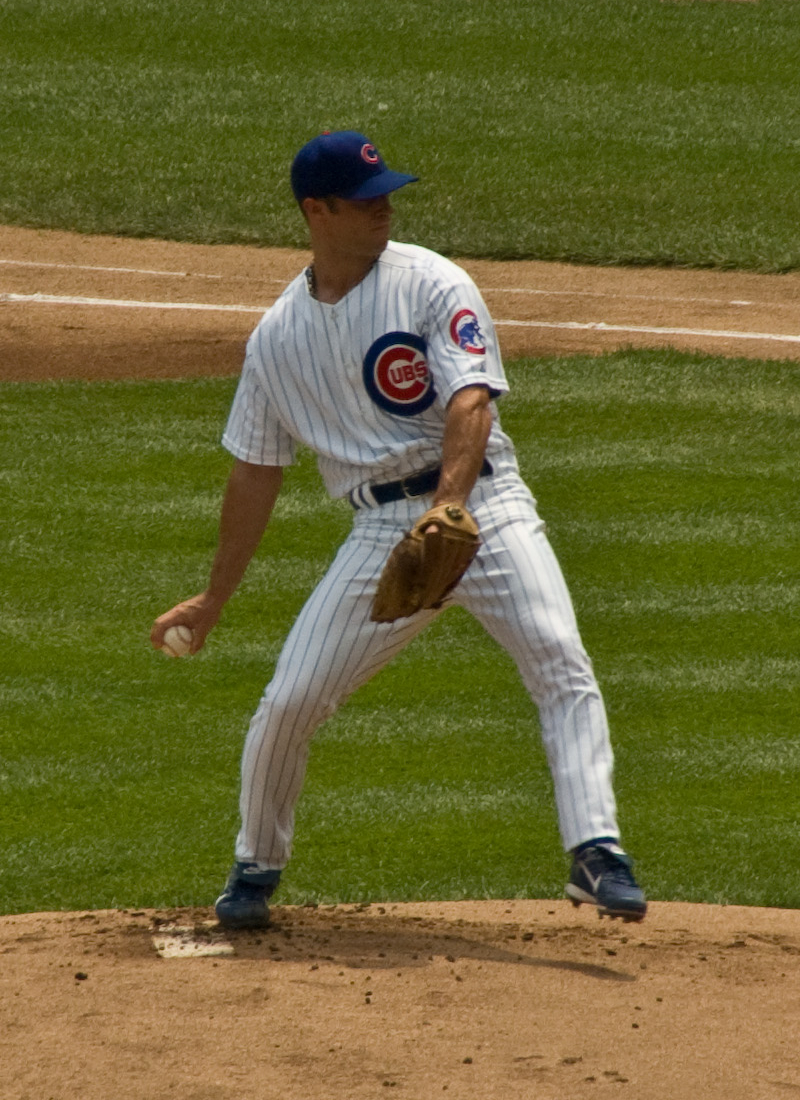
Harden pitching for the Cubs in 2008

Harden was traded to the Chicago Cubs on July 8, 2008, in a six-player deal. The Cubs traded Matt Murton, Eric Patterson, Sean Gallagher, and Josh Donaldson to Oakland for Harden and Chad Gaudin. He made his Cubs debut on July 12, against the San Francisco Giants, leaving the game with a 7–0 lead after pitching 5 1/3 scoreless inning and striking out 10. Though the Cubs won 8–7, Harden earned a no decision after Carlos Mármol was unable to hold a five-run lead in the ninth. Harden registered ten strikeouts and allowed only one run in both of his following starts, but was not able to earn a win. He finally recorded his first win as a Cub on July 31, 2008, against the Milwaukee Brewers. At this point, Harden had the highest winning percentage among all starting pitchers over the last three years, with a record of 15–4 (.789). On October 8, 2008, the Cubs picked up the $7 million option in Harden's contract for the 2009 season. He had a 9–9 record in 2009. He became a free agent following the season.

=== Texas Rangers (2010) ===
On December 10, 2009, Harden signed with the Texas Rangers to a one year, $6.5 million contract, with a mutual option for 2011. Harden struggled in 2010 with a 5.68 ERA through 13 starts. He threw more pitches per inning than any starter in the league. He was put on the DL in June with a gluteal strain and returned to the rotation on July 31, pushing Scott Feldman to the bullpen. On August 23, 2010, the Texas Rangers combined for 8 1/3 innings of no-hit ball on the Minnesota Twins, in which Rich Harden pitched 6 2/3 innings but was pulled after throwing 111 pitches. Neftalí Feliz eventually gave up the first hit for the Twins with one out in the ninth, a single to catcher Joe Mauer. Texas won the game, 4–0. He was designated for assignment on October 6. On October 8, Harden was released by the Texas Rangers after being left off the postseason roster. The Rangers were playing the Tampa Bay Rays in the ALDS at the time. Harden finished 2009 with a 5–5 record and a 5.58 ERA.

=== Oakland Athletics (second stint) (2011) ===
On December 21, 2010, Harden rejoined the Athletics on a one-year contract. On July 30, 2011, Oakland agreed to trade Harden to the Boston Red Sox in exchange for Triple-A first baseman Lars Anderson and a player to be named later. That deal, however, fell through after the Red Sox front office reviewed Harden's medical records and determined that it was unlikely he would make it through the season without injury. Harden remained with the Athletics through the next day's non-waiver trade deadline. He finished the year at 4–4 over fifteen games with a 5.12 ERA but a high 9.91 strikeouts per nine innings. The Athletics declined arbitration at the end of the season.

During the 2011–12 off-season, Harden underwent shoulder surgery and spent the entire 2012 season on free agency without signing for a team or playing a single game.

=== Minnesota Twins (2013) ===
After a one year hiatus from baseball due to recovering from shoulder surgery, Harden signed a minor league contract with the Minnesota Twins on December 21, 2012. Harden was released on July 27, 2013 without pitching for the Twins or their minor league affiliates.

== Pitching style ==
Harden threw four pitches: a fastball, a changeup, a splitter, and a slider. Harden's fastball typically reached speeds of 92–96 miles per hour (mph) and on occasion broke 100 mph. Because of the grip he used, his splitter often acted much like a knuckleball because it was difficult to predict what it would do, resulting in it often being referred to as the "ghost pitch". Former Oakland Athletics catcher Adam Melhuse coined the term "spluckle" (a combination of splitter and knuckleball) to refer to this innovative pitch.

Harden was well known for his ability to strike out batters. With the exception of his 2010 season with the Texas Rangers, he struck out over a quarter of batters he faced after 2006. His swinging strike rate of 13 percent was highest of all major league starters from 2008 to mid-2010. His career swinging strike rate was 12.5 percent, third highest among pitchers who threw at least 700 innings from 2003 to 2011.
