= Chad Gaudin =

American baseball player (born 1983)

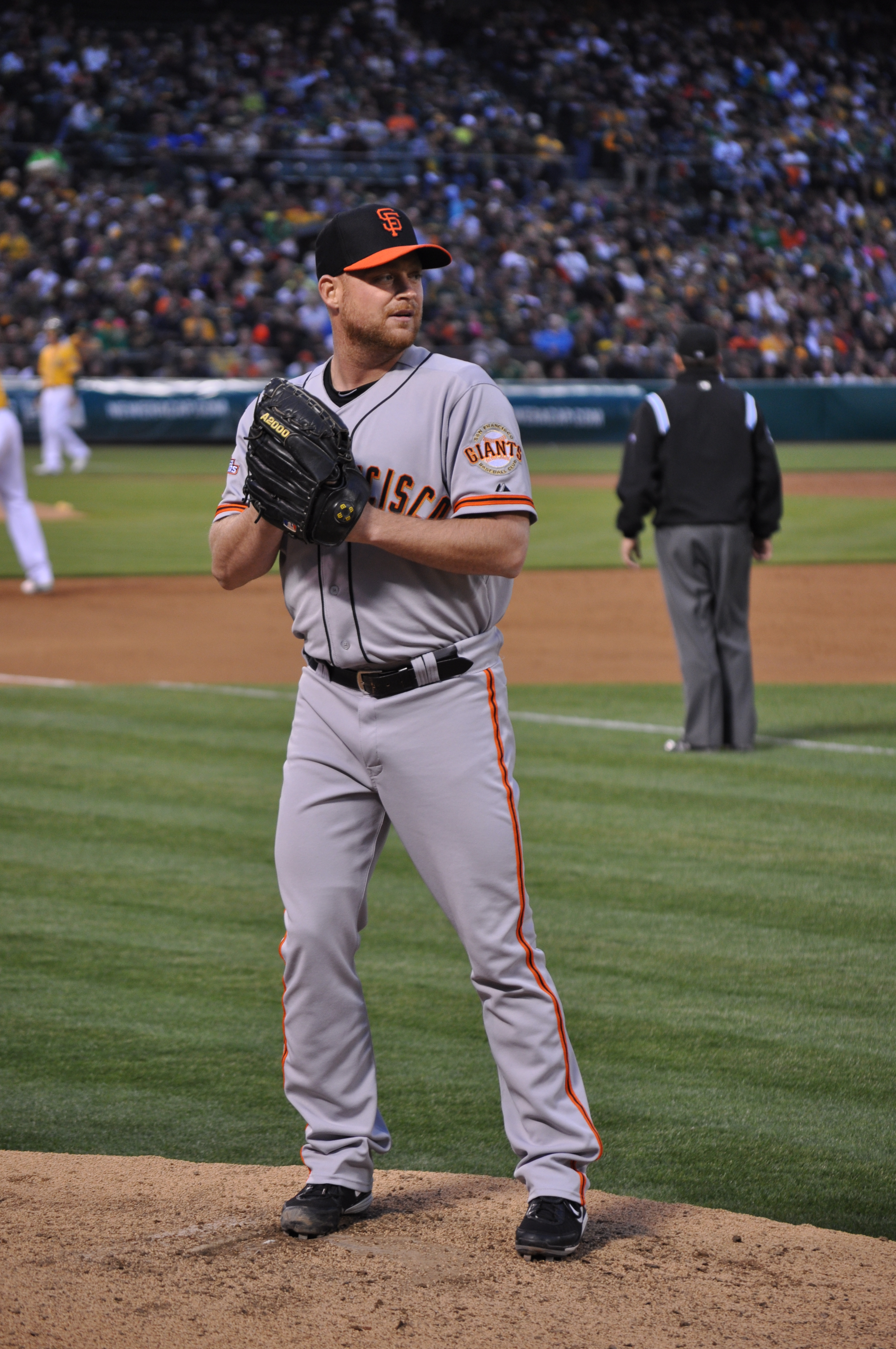
- Gaudin with the San Francisco Giants
- Pitcher
- Born: March 24, 1983 (age 43); New Orleans, Louisiana, U.S.
- Batted: Right Threw: Right

MLB debut
- August 1, 2003, for the Tampa Bay Devil Rays

Last MLB appearance
- August 16, 2013, for the San Francisco Giants

MLB statistics
- Win–loss record: 45–44
- Earned run average: 4.44
- Strikeouts: 673
- Stats at Baseball Reference

Teams
- Tampa Bay Devil Rays (2003–2004); Toronto Blue Jays (2005); Oakland Athletics (2006–2008); Chicago Cubs (2008); San Diego Padres (2009); New York Yankees (2009); Oakland Athletics (2010); New York Yankees (2010); Washington Nationals (2011); Miami Marlins (2012); San Francisco Giants (2013)

Career highlights and awards
- World Series champion (2009)

Chad Edward Gaudin (/ɡoʊˈdæn/; born March 24, 1983) is an American former professional baseball pitcher. He has been used as both a starting pitcher and a reliever throughout his career, functioning as a "swingman."

Gaudin has pitched in Major League Baseball (MLB) for the Tampa Bay Devil Rays, Toronto Blue Jays, Oakland Athletics, Chicago Cubs, San Diego Padres, New York Yankees, Washington Nationals, Miami Marlins, and San Francisco Giants.

== High school ==
Gaudin attended Crescent City Baptist High School in Metairie, Louisiana. He earned All-State and district MVP in his junior and senior years. He committed to Louisiana State University in November 2000. In 2001, he struck out 203 batters in 89 innings to win The Times-Picayune Player of the Year honors.

== Professional career ==
=== Tampa Bay Devil Rays ===
Gaudin was selected by the Tampa Bay Devil Rays out of high school in the 34th round (1009th overall pick) of the 2001 Major League Baseball draft. He signed on August 23, 2001, and did not play professionally until 2002. That year, he maintained a 2.26 ERA in 119.1 innings as a starter and reliever for the Single-A Charleston RiverDogs.

Before the 2003 season, Baseball America ranked him as the 20th best prospect in the Devil Rays system. He worked 14 games as a starter for the Bakersfield Blaze in High-A before making it up to Double-A. On July 15, in his first start for the Orlando Rays, Gaudin pitched a seven-inning perfect game in the first half of a doubleheader. On the road against the Jacksonville Suns, he struck out nine batters on just 78 pitches, retiring all 21 batters he faced. (Two 7-inning games is the standard for a doubleheader in most minor leagues; Major League Baseball would later amend a rule recognizing only efforts of at least nine innings as official perfect games.) Gaudin made only two more starts and posted an 0.47 ERA for Orlando before the Devil Rays called him up to the majors.

Gaudin made his major league debut on August 1, allowing one run in 2.1 innings against the Kansas City Royals that day. At the time of his debut, he was 20 years and 130 days, making him the youngest Devil Ray to debut to that point. He posted a very respectable 2–0 record and 3.60 ERA in 15 appearances (including three starts) in 2003 for the Devil Rays.

In 2004, Devil Rays manager Lou Piniella used Gaudin out of the bullpen in order to face tough right-handed batters. He made four starts in the month of June, including a start on June 22 where he walked four in the first inning before being pulled. Overall, Gaudin went 1–2 with a 4.85 ERA in 26 appearances while splitting time with the Triple-A Durham Bulls.

=== Toronto Blue Jays ===
On December 12, 2004, Gaudin was traded to the Toronto Blue Jays for backup catcher Kevin Cash. He spent most of the season with the Syracuse SkyChiefs in Triple-A, posting a 9–8 record with a 3.35 ERA in 150.1 innings. In five appearances (three starts) with the Blue Jays, he was just 1–3 while allowing 19 runs on 31 hits (six home runs) in 13 innings.

=== Oakland Athletics ===
On December 5, 2005, he was traded to the Oakland Athletics for a player to be named later, who later turned out to be outfielder Dustin Majewski.

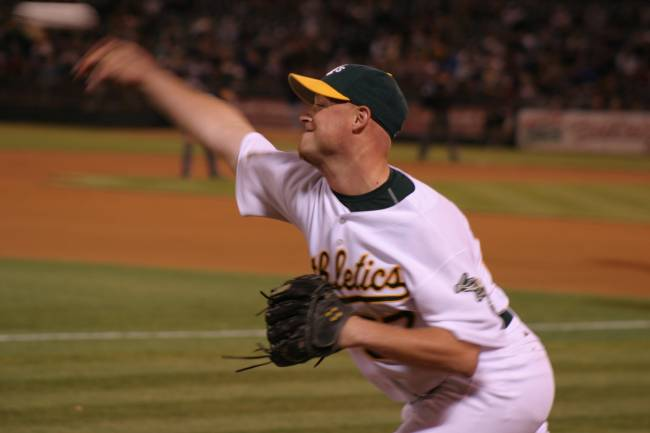
Gaudin with the Oakland Athletics in 2006.

Gaudin began the 2006 season in Triple-A with the Sacramento River Cats. He posted a 0.36 ERA in 4 starts for the River Cats and was promoted to the majors on April 21 to pitch out of the bullpen. He pitched in relief for the rest of the season with the Athletics, posting a 3.09 ERA in 64 innings.

In 2007, Gaudin was put in the rotation when veteran Esteban Loaiza started the season on the disabled list. He pitched to a 2.88 ERA in the first half of the season. On June 30, he and Rich Harden threw a one-hitter against the New York Yankees. His excellent performance as a starter resulted in the media considering him part of the new 'Big Three' that included Dan Haren and Joe Blanton. However, Gaudin had a 6.30 ERA after the All-Star break.

In December 2007, Gaudin underwent surgery to repair a labrum tear in his hip and remove the sesamoid bone in his right big toe. He returned to pitching again by March 2008, putting him just two weeks behind the other pitchers. However, he ultimately started the season on the disabled list and was due to miss additional time before a rash of injuries forced the A's to activate Gaudin a week early. He posted a 3.75 ERA through six starts, but was moved to the bullpen, on May 7, in favor of Rich Harden. He then held a 3.38 ERA in 26.2 innings as a reliever.

=== Chicago Cubs ===
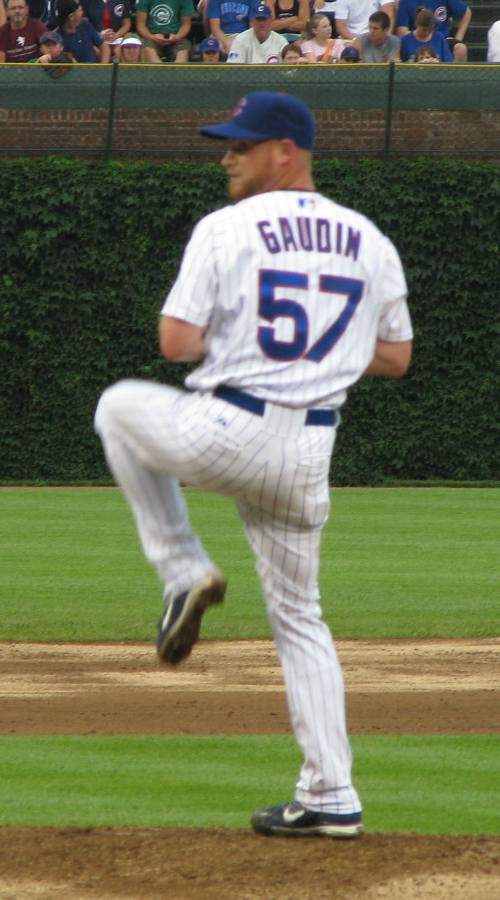
Gaudin with the Chicago Cubs in 2008.

On July 8, 2008, Gaudin was dealt, along with Rich Harden, to the Chicago Cubs in exchange for Sean Gallagher, Matt Murton, Eric Patterson, and minor league catcher Josh Donaldson.

Despite posting a 4-2 record, Gaudin pitched poorly for the Cubs, pitching to a 6.26 ERA in 27.1 innings. He missed several weeks to a sore back between August and September. Gaudin was released by the Cubs on April 5, 2009, after he pitched poorly in spring training.

=== San Diego Padres ===
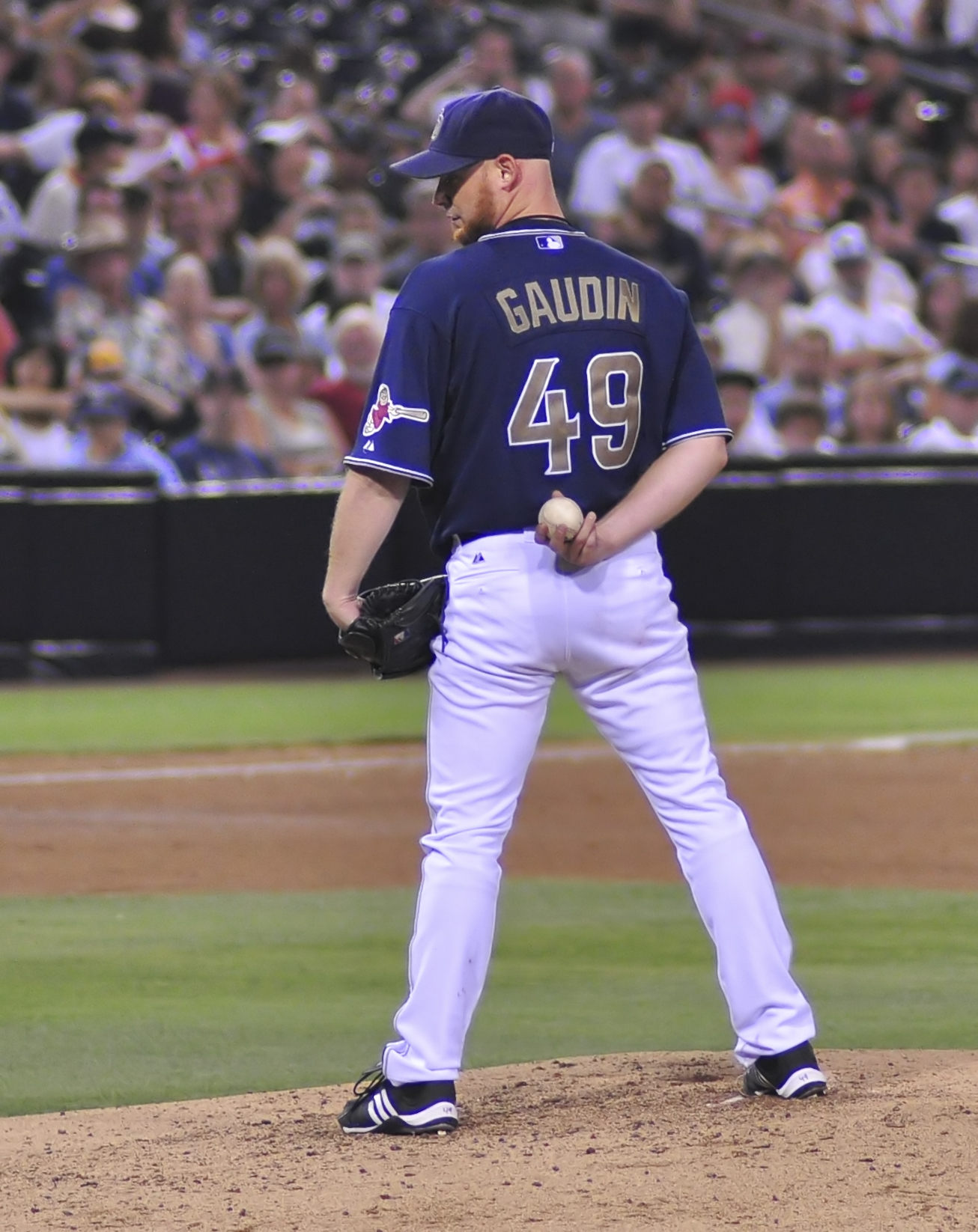
Gaudin with the San Diego Padres in 2009.

The San Diego Padres signed him to a minor league contract on April 12. He was assigned to their Triple-A team, the Portland Beavers on April 14. After two starts with the Beavers, he was called up to the majors to start against the Colorado Rockies on April 28. He allowed three hits and four walks while striking out five over five innings in a 4–3 Padres win. He was named National League Player of the Week, alongside Hanley Ramirez, for the week of June 28 after allowing just two runs and striking out 20 in 15 innings over two starts. Through 19 starts and 1 relief appearance, Gaudin was 4-10 with a 5.13 ERA and 105 strikeouts in 105.1 innings pitched.

=== New York Yankees ===
On August 6, 2009, Gaudin was traded to the New York Yankees for a player to be named later. The Padres later agreed to cash considerations, believe to be $100,000. With the Yankees, Gaudin filled a valuable role as a spot starter and relief pitcher. He recorded a 3.43 ERA, making six starts and five relief appearances. Gaudin was included on the Yankees postseason roster. He received a championship ring after the Yankees won the 2009 World Series against the Philadelphia Phillies.

Gaudin entered spring training in 2010 as a contender for the fifth spot in the rotation. He was released by the Yankees on March 25, after Phil Hughes won the fifth starter role.

=== Oakland Athletics (second stint) ===
On March 28, 2010, Gaudin signed a major league deal with the Oakland Athletics. He allowed 17 earned runs on 27 hits over 17.1 innings out of the bullpen and was designated for assignment on May 17. Gaudin was released on May 21.

=== New York Yankees (second stint) ===
On May 26, 2010, Gaudin re-signed with the Yankees to serve as a long reliever while Alfredo Aceves remained on the disabled list. He pitched in 30 games with a 1-2 record and a 4.50 ERA. Gaudin was ultimately left off the Yankees playoff roster. On November 2, he was outrighted to the minor leagues and elected free agency.

=== Washington Nationals ===
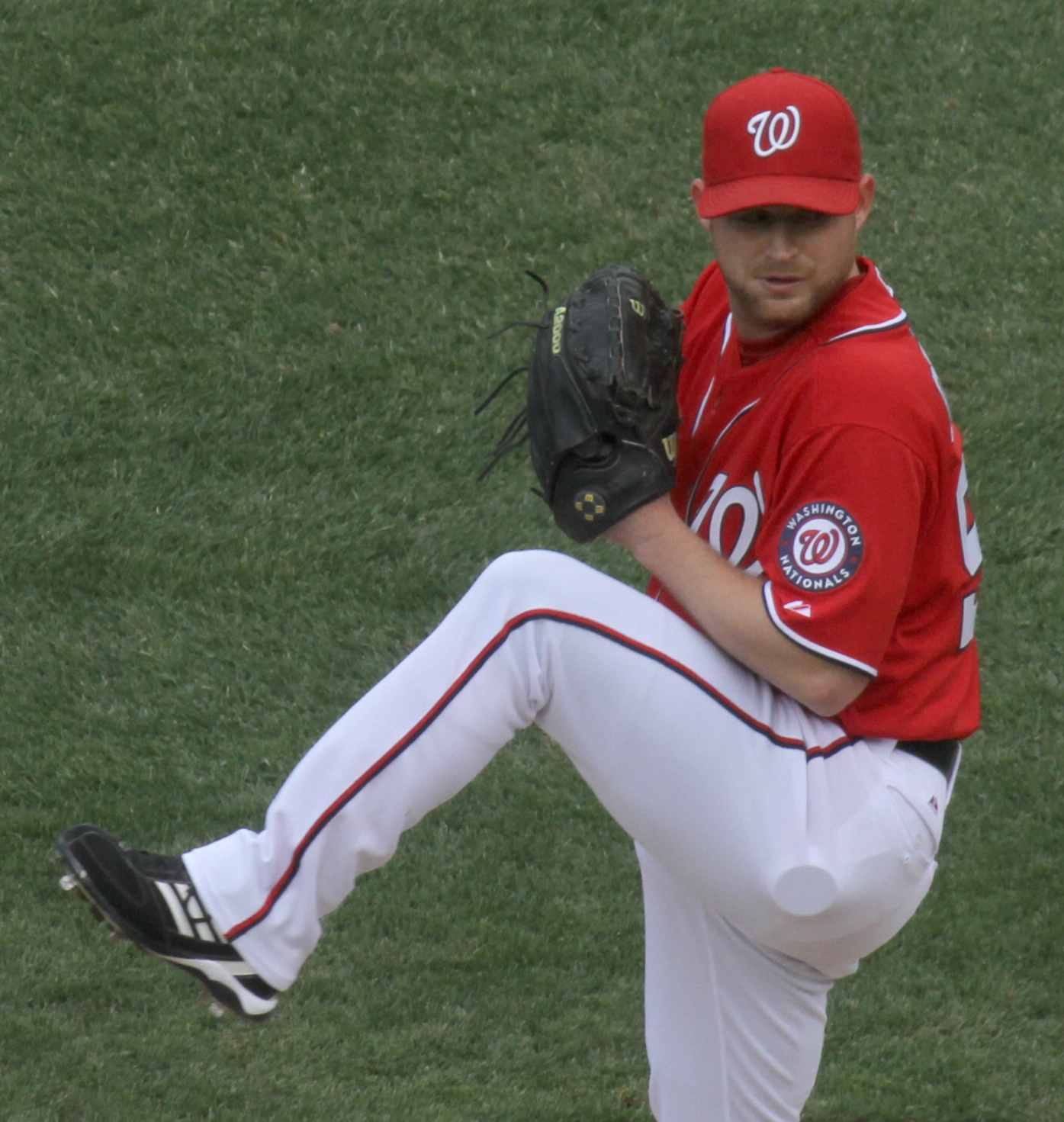
Gaudin with the Washington Nationals.

On December 17, Gaudin signed a minor-league contract with the Washington Nationals. He was included on the team's opening day roster. Gaudin made 10 appearances for the Nationals, recording a 6.48 ERA in 8 1/3 innings before hitting the disabled list with shoulder inflammation on April 27. He was designated for assignment on July 19 and released on July 21.

=== Toronto Blue Jays (second stint) ===
Gaudin signed a minor league contract with the Toronto Blue Jays on August 5. He went 2–3 with a 6.14 ERA in six starts for the Las Vegas 51s in Triple-A. He elected free agency on November 2.

=== Miami Marlins ===
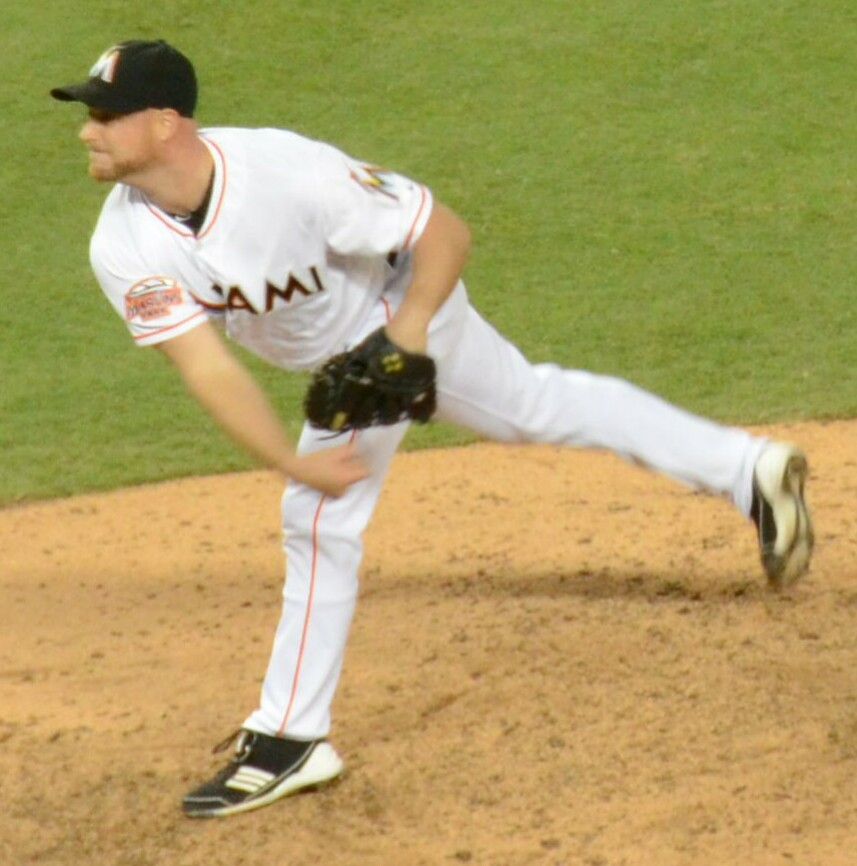
Gaudin pitching for the Miami Marlins in 2012

On January 4, 2012, Gaudin signed a minor league contract with the Miami Marlins and received an invite to spring training. He was included on the team's opening day roster and spent the year in the bullpen as the team's long reliever. He finished the year with a 4.45 ERA in 69.1 innings across 46 appearances. He became a free agent after the season.

=== San Francisco Giants ===
Gaudin signed a minor league deal with the San Francisco Giants on December 13, 2012. On March 26, 2013, it was reported that Gaudin had his contract purchased and had been added to the Major League roster as the final piece of the bullpen. The San Jose Mercury News reported that "Gaudin will be the long man and a swing man of sorts, capable of pitching several innings at a time or even spot-starting."

Gaudin pitched to a 2.05 ERA in 30.2 innings out of the bullpen through the end of May. He was then put into the rotation to replace an injured Ryan Vogelsong. After four starts in June, Gaudin was placed on the disabled list after he was hit in the elbow with a batted ball on June 20. His season ended prematurely when he was again placed on the disabled list on August 20 with carpal tunnel syndrome. Overall, he made 12 starts for the Giants, finishing with a 5–2 record and 3.06 ERA, while striking out 88 batters in 97 innings.

=== Philadelphia Phillies ===
Gaudin signed a minor league deal with the Philadelphia Phillies on January 21, 2014. The Phillies released him on February 13 when he failed a physical. Gaudin underwent a procedure to relieve pressure on a nerve in his neck and missed the entire 2014 season.

=== Los Angeles Dodgers ===
On February 25, 2015, Gaudin signed a minor league contract with the Los Angeles Dodgers. He battled a recurring bout of nerve irritation during spring training and did not make the club, instead he was shut down for a period to recover. He wound up undergoing carpal tunnel release surgery and spent the entire season rehabbing in Arizona. He elected free agency on November 6.

=== Pericos de Puebla ===
On April 1, 2016, Gaudin signed with the Pericos de Puebla of the Mexican Baseball League (LMB). He served as the team's closer, pitching to a 1.64 ERA with 33 saves—a team record—in 44 innings. He saved seven more games in the playoffs and was on the mound when the Pericos won the Mexican League Championship Series.

=== Acereros de Monclova ===
On February 21, 2017, Gaudin, along with Daric Barton, Manny Rodriguez, Nyjer Morgan, Rodolfo Amador, and Willy Taveras were traded to the Acereros de Monclova in exchange for RHP Joaquín Lara. Gaudin maintained a 2.93 ERA with 29 saves in 43 innings and was an All-Star. He was released on April 14, 2018.

=== Leones de Yucatán ===
On April 23, 2018, Gaudin signed with the Leones de Yucatán of the Mexican Baseball League. He was part of the team's championship run that year where he appeared in 22 games 23.2 inning of relief going 1-2 with a 3.04 ERA with 15 strikeouts and 12 saves. In 2019, he missed time due to a back injury and appeared in 12 games 14.2 innings of relief going 1-1 with a 4.91 ERA with 10 strikeouts and 4 saves. He was released on January 11, 2020.

== Pitching style ==
Gaudin works with four pitches. His main one is a four-seam fastball at 90–93 mph. He also has a two-seamer at 89–92, a slider at 79–82, and a changeup at 86–89. His slider is mainly used against right-handed hitters (especially with two strikes), while his changeup is used almost exclusively against lefties. Gaudin was known for his impressive slider, which he initially learned to throw in Little League.

== Personal life ==
Gaudin is married to Syndal Gorden since January 29, 2011. The couple appeared on an episode of House Hunters.

Syndal chose her wedding gown on an episode of Say Yes to the Dress entitled The Group Calls It. She was accompanied to Kleinfeld's by Yankee wives Amber (Mrs. C.C.) Sabathia and Karen (Mrs. A.J.) Burnett and a friend, Tara Neal, who picked her dress for her. When the episode was aired, Gaudin was with the Nationals.

In July 2013, it was reported that Gaudin had been charged with lewdness stemming from an incident in January. While in the emergency room of Desert Springs Hospital, it was alleged that Gaudin groped a woman while she was lying on a gurney. In September he pleaded no contest to a reduced charge of disorderly conduct and was sentenced to 100 hours of community service and impulse control counselling.
