= Corey Patterson =

American baseball player (born 1979)

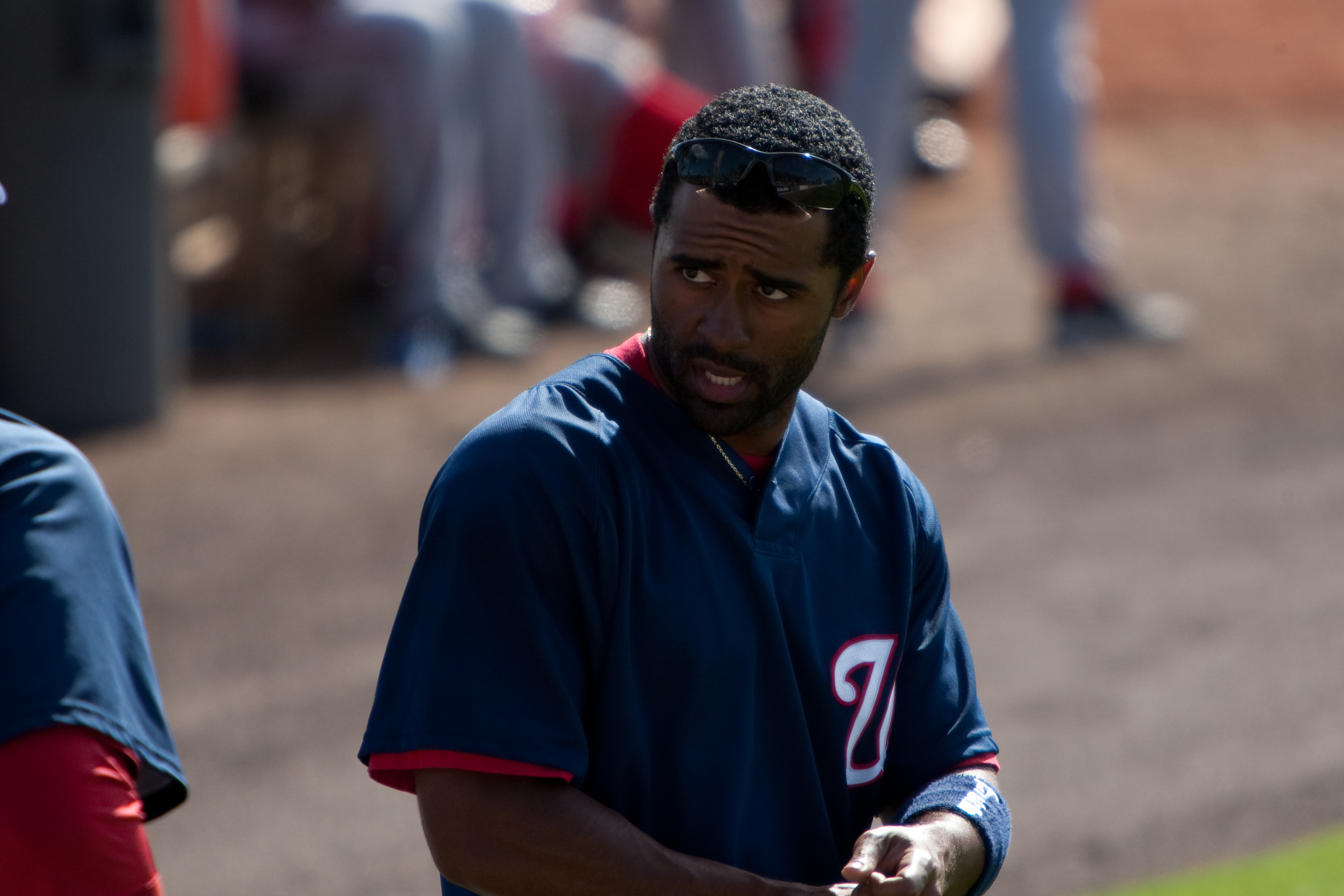
- Patterson with the Washington Nationals in 2009
- Center fielder
- Born: August 13, 1979 (age 47); Atlanta, Georgia, U.S.
- Batted: Left Threw: Right

MLB debut
- September 18, 2000, for the Chicago Cubs

Last MLB appearance
- September 27, 2011, for the St. Louis Cardinals

MLB statistics
- Batting average: .252
- Home runs: 118
- Runs batted in: 431
- Stats at Baseball Reference

Teams
- Chicago Cubs (2000–2005); Baltimore Orioles (2006–2007); Cincinnati Reds (2008); Washington Nationals (2009); Milwaukee Brewers (2009); Baltimore Orioles (2010); Toronto Blue Jays (2011); St. Louis Cardinals (2011)

Donald Corey Patterson (born August 13, 1979) is an American former professional baseball center fielder. He debuted with the Chicago Cubs in Major League Baseball in 2000 after being a first-round draft pick in 1998 and top prospect. After playing with the Cubs through 2005, Patterson played for six other MLB teams, playing multiple seasons for only the Baltimore Orioles. He was the head coach for the Brookhaven Bucks in the collegiate Sunbelt Baseball League from 2015 to 2026, winning the league championship in 2018 and 2019.

== Amateur career ==
Patterson attended Harrison High School in Kennesaw, Georgia, and helped Harrison win the Georgia state championship as a senior in 1998, batting .528 with 22 home runs, 61 RBI, and 38 stolen bases in 38 games. Patterson was named to the first-team All-America team by Baseball America and USA Today. He was selected by USA Baseball as its Amateur Player of the Year. He shared the National High School Baseball Coaches Association Player of the Year award with Drew Henson and Gerald Laird. Patterson was also named a Baseball America second-team selection after his junior season.

== Professional career ==
=== Chicago Cubs ===
Patterson was selected by the Chicago Cubs as the third overall pick in the 1998 Major League Baseball draft. He signed a five-year, $3.7 million contract that was the largest draft contract in history. He made his professional debut in 1999 with the Lansing Lugnuts of the Class-A Midwest League and won the league's Prospect of the Year Award after leading the circuit in slugging percentage (.592), extra base hits (72) and triples (17). He also batted .320 with 20 homers and 79 RBI, and was named to the league's all-star team both at mid-season and postseason. Baseball America named Patterson the league's top prospect. After the 1999 season, he played in the Arizona Fall League and was that league's youngest player. He batted .368 with 4 home runs, 24 RBI, and 8 stolen bases in 35 games, and was named to the league's all-star team.

In 2000, Patterson was promoted to the Double-A West Tenn Diamond Jaxx of the Southern League. He was named to the league's mid-season and postseason all-star team, and was named the league's top prospect by Baseball America. Patterson batted .268 with 22 home runs and 82 RBI, finishing second in the league in home runs.

After playing in the 2000 Southern League playoffs, Patterson was called up from the minors to play for the Cubs. He made his major league debut on September 18, 2000, against the Milwaukee Brewers. The next day, Patterson recorded his first major league hit, a home run off Juan Acevedo. He finished the 2000 season with seven hits in 42 at bats and two home runs.

Patterson did not start playing a full major league season until 2002, when he finished with a .253 batting average. In 2003, he batted .298 with 55 RBI in only 83 games before suffering a torn ACL while running to first on a base hit against the St. Louis Cardinals on July 6. The injury ended Patterson's 2003 campaign.

Patterson played 157 games in 2004, with a .266 batting average, 24 home runs, and 72 RBI in 631 at-bats. His on-base plus slugging of .771, while below the major league average, was his best of the eight MLB seasons in which he played more than 83 games.

On July 7, 2005, Patterson was sent down to the Triple-A Iowa Cubs. The demotion came after the Cubs had lost a season-high eight games in a row. He had lost the starting center field role to Jerry Hairston Jr. Patterson was back up with the major league team on August 9, after his one-month stint in Triple-A.

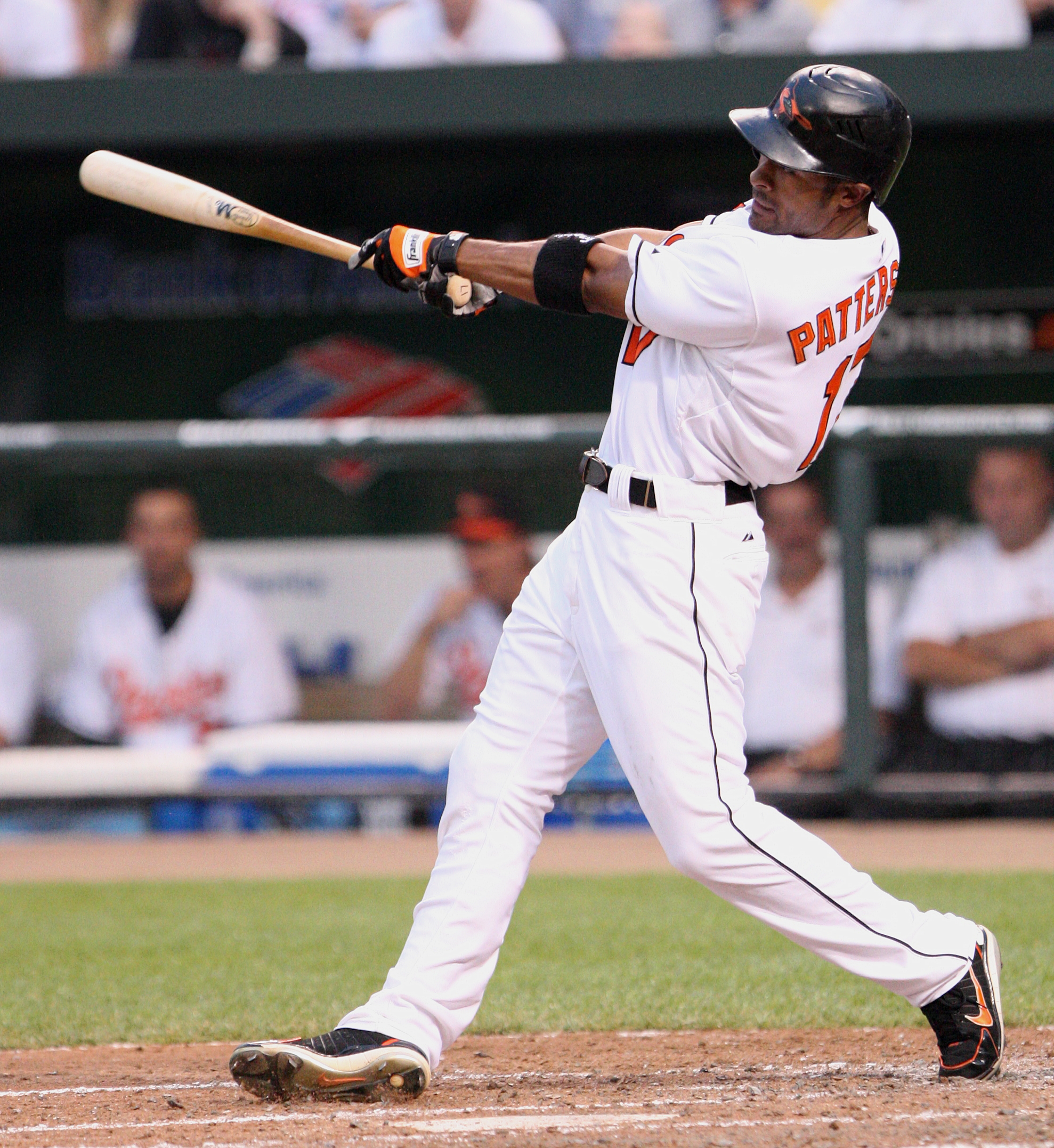
Patterson batting for the Orioles in 2007.

=== Baltimore Orioles ===
Patterson was traded by the Cubs to the Orioles on January 9, 2006, for minor league players Nate Spears and Carlos Perez. On February 10, 2007, Patterson signed a 1-year deal worth $4.3 million to avoid arbitration. In his first of two years with the Orioles, he batted .276 with 16 home runs and 53 RBI. He also stole 45 bases, which ranked third in the American League. Patterson's contract was not renewed after the 2007 season.

=== Cincinnati Reds ===
On March 3, 2008, the Cincinnati Reds signed Patterson to a minor league contract. At the end of Spring training, he was added to the 40-man roster. Dusty Baker, manager of the Reds and Patterson's manager in Chicago, was instrumental in signing Patterson. Baker often voiced his opinion on Patterson saying he thought Patterson is still a developing player.

Patterson was invited to the Reds' spring training camp, and he started the 2008 season in center field for Cincinnati. Platooning with utility man Ryan Freel, Patterson began the season well. Gradually his average deteriorated, culminating in an 0-for-8 performance during Cincinnati's 18-inning loss to San Diego on May 25. The following day top outfield prospect Jay Bruce was called up from the Triple-A Louisville Bats to start in center field, demoting Patterson to the Reds' bench. On May 28, Patterson accepted a reassignment to Triple-A Louisville. The demotion lasted only one week, however, when Patterson was recalled to replace Freel, who went to the disabled list with a strained right hamstring on June 4. Patterson ended the season with a .205 batting average and .238 OBP.

=== Washington Nationals ===
On December 18, 2008, Patterson signed a minor league contract with an invitation to spring training with the Washington Nationals.

Due to Josh Willingham being placed on the bereavement list, Patterson had his contract purchased from the Triple-A Syracuse Chiefs on June 13, 2009. He hit .302, with six home runs and 23 RBIs in a 39 games with the Chiefs, but hit only .133 with 2 stolen bases in 5 games for the Nationals. He was reassigned to Triple-A on June 20. He was released by the Nationals on July 29.

=== Milwaukee Brewers ===
Patterson signed a minor league contract with the Milwaukee Brewers on August 1, 2009. Patterson hit well with the Triple-A Nashville Sounds, batting .331 with a .963 OPS over 29 games and 124 at-bats. However, he struggled with the parent club, where his BA, OBP, and SLG were all .071 over 11 games and 14 at-bats.

=== Seattle Mariners ===
Patterson signed a minor league contract with the Seattle Mariners on December 9, 2009. However, he opted out of his contract on March 31, 2010, after being informed he had not made the major league team.

=== Baltimore Orioles (second stint) ===
On April 21, 2010, Corey agreed to re-join the Orioles on a 1-year minor league deal. He was promoted to the Orioles on May 12. On July 9, Patterson hit his first career grand slam against the Texas Rangers. It was a remarkable feat as Patterson faced the season's eventual saves leader and rookie of the year, the hard-throwing Neftalí Feliz, with a 2–2 count and two outs in the top of the 9th inning representing the tying run. Patterson drilled his pitch over the right field fence to tie the game at 6.

=== Toronto Blue Jays ===
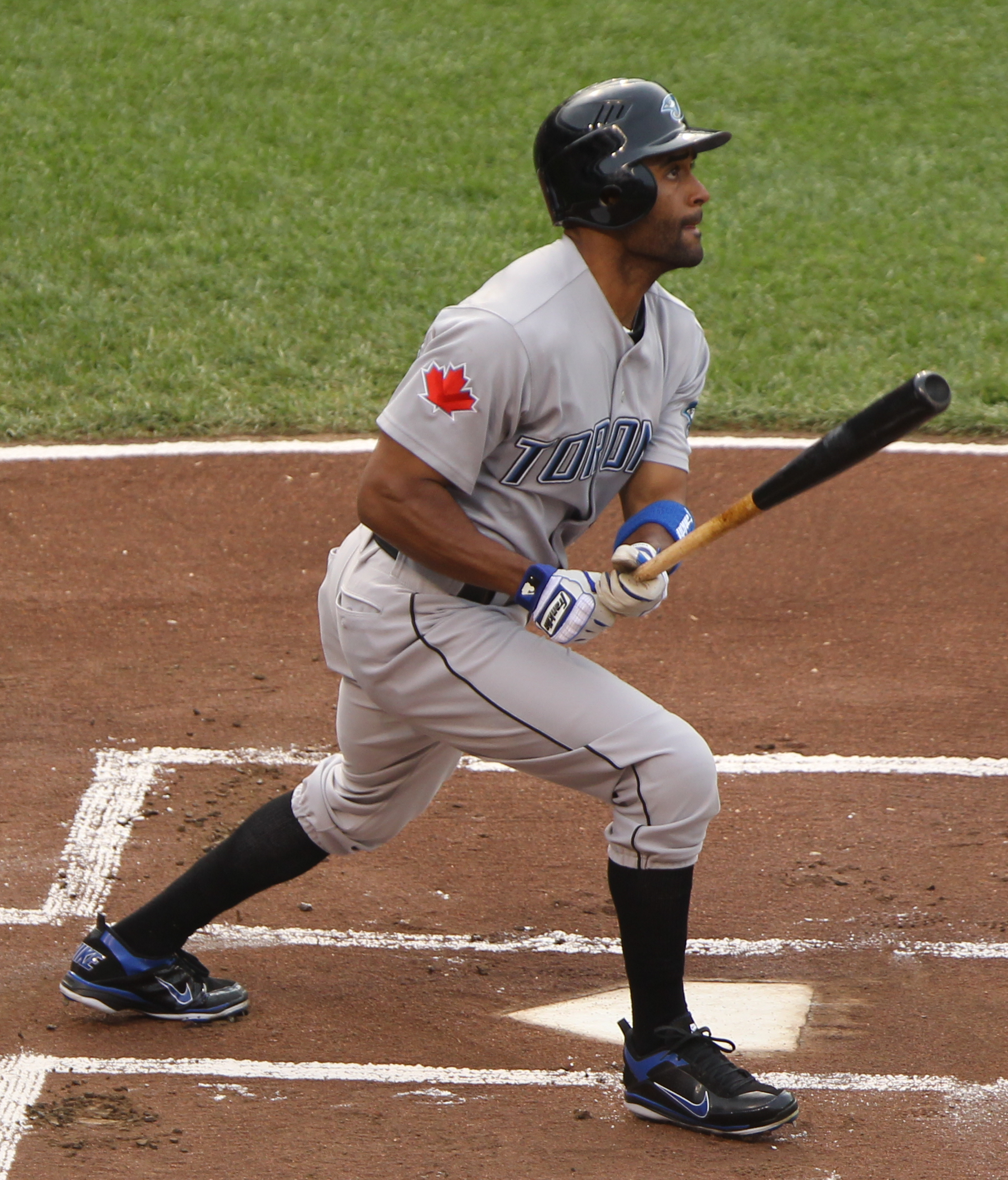
Patterson with the Blue Jays

On December 21, 2010, Patterson signed a minor league contract with an invitation to spring training with the Toronto Blue Jays. He began the season on the Major League roster, but on the disabled list because of a head injury. Patterson made his regular season debut as a Blue Jay on April 11, 2011, against the Seattle Mariners, hitting a home run and finishing the night 2-for-4 with 2 RBI

=== St. Louis Cardinals ===
On July 27, 2011, Patterson was traded to the St. Louis Cardinals with Octavio Dotel, Marc Rzepczynski, and Edwin Jackson for Colby Rasmus, P. J. Walters, Trever Miller and Brian Tallet. In his final major league action, Patterson batted .157 with 4 doubles in 44 games for St. Louis to close out the 2011 season.

=== Milwaukee Brewers (second stint) ===
On January 30, 2012, Patterson signed a minor league contract to return to the Brewers organization. He played 117 games for Triple-A Nashville, batting .251 with 39 RBI in 390 plate appearances. For the first season since his major league debut, he did not play in the major leagues.

=== New York Mets ===
Patterson signed a minor league contract with the New York Mets in February 2013. The Mets released Patterson in March 2013.

=== Seattle Mariners (second stint) ===
Patterson signed a minor league contract with the Seattle Mariners on April 30, 2013, but was released on June 6, after hitting only .175 in 19 games for the Triple-A Tacoma Rainiers.

=== New York Yankees ===
Patterson signed a minor league deal with the New York Yankees on June 21, 2013. He elected free agency on November 4.

== Post-playing career and personal life ==
After retiring as a player, Patterson became the manager of the collegiate summer baseball Brookhaven Bucks in the Sunbelt Baseball League in 2015. He won league titles in 2018 and 2019.

Patterson is the older brother of infielder Eric Patterson and the son of former NFL defensive back Don Patterson. Patterson committed to play college football as a wide receiver for the Georgia Tech Yellow Jackets before signing with the Cubs.

== See also ==
- List of Major League Baseball career stolen bases leaders
