= Sean Gallagher (baseball) =

American baseball player (born 1985)

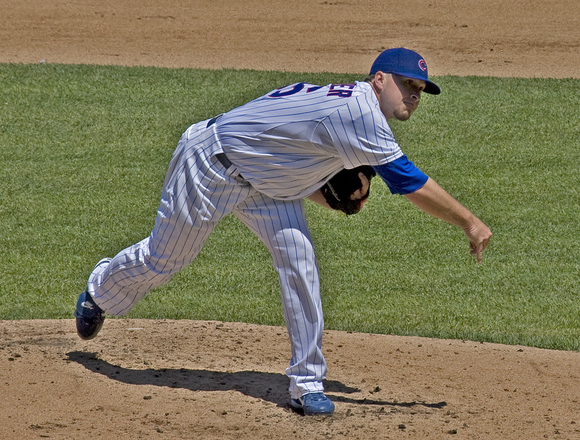
- Gallagher with the Chicago Cubs
- Pitcher
- Born: December 30, 1985 (age 40); Boston, Massachusetts, U.S.
- Batted: Right Threw: Right

MLB debut
- June 9, 2007, for the Chicago Cubs

Last MLB appearance
- October 3, 2010, for the Pittsburgh Pirates

MLB statistics
- Win–loss record: 10–10
- Earned run average: 5.64
- Strikeouts: 165
- Stats at Baseball Reference

Teams
- Chicago Cubs (2007–2008); Oakland Athletics (2008–2009); San Diego Padres (2009–2010); Pittsburgh Pirates (2010)

Sean Patrick Gallagher (born December 30, 1985) is an American former professional baseball pitcher. He played in Major League Baseball (MLB) for the Chicago Cubs, Oakland Athletics, San Diego Padres, and Pittsburgh Pirates.

== Professional career ==
=== Chicago Cubs ===
Gallagher was drafted by the Chicago Cubs in the 12th round of the 2004 Major League Baseball draft. In his first pro season, he went 1–2 with a 3.12 ERA over 10 games in with the Arizona League Cubs. Gallagher allowed 19 runs, 12 earned, on 38 hits in 34 2/3 innings, striking out 44 and walking 11.

In 2005 Gallagher was selected as the Cubs minor league pitcher of the year. He played for the Peoria Chiefs and made the Midwest League All-Star Game and was voted by Baseball America as having the best breaking ball in the Midwest League. He went 14–5 with a 2.71 ERA in 26 games for Peoria, allowing 53 runs, 44 earned, on 107 hits over 146 innings. Gallagher struck out 139 and walked 55. He ranked first in the league in wins with 14, third in ERA with a 2.71 clip and fourth in strikeouts with 139. Gallagher also started one game for the Class-A Advanced Daytona Cubs, scattering one earned run on six hits over five innings and striking out seven.

Gallagher split time between the Double-A West Tenn Diamond Jaxx and Class-A Advanced Daytona. He went 7–5 with a 2.71 ERA, 30 runs, 26 earned, on 74 hits over 86 1/3 innings while striking out 91 and walking 55 with West Tenn. He also went 4–0 with a 2.30 ERA, 24 runs, 20 earned, on 75 hits in 78 1/3 innings while striking out 80 and walking 21 with Daytona.

Gallagher made his major league debut on June 9, 2007, against the Atlanta Braves. During the week of April 20 – 27, 2008, Gallagher was named the Pacific Coast League pitcher of the week. The Cubs called him up to take the place of Rich Hill in their starting rotation after Hill struggled early in 2008.

=== Oakland Athletics ===
On July 8, 2008, Gallagher was traded from the Chicago Cubs as part of a six-player trade that saw the Cubs acquire Rich Harden and Chad Gaudin from the Oakland Athletics. With the A's he went 2–3 with a 5.88 ERA in 11 starts.

He went 1–2 with an 8.16 ERA in 14 1/3 innings pitched in six games, two starts with the A's in 2009.

=== San Diego Padres ===
On July 28, 2009, it was announced that he will be sent to the San Diego Padres as the player to be named later in the trade for Scott Hairston. On September 7, he made his Padres debut. He went 2–0 in eight relief appearances for the Padres in '09.

On July 1, 2010, Gallagher was designated for assignment after Matt Stairs and Tim Stauffer were activated from the 15-Day disabled list.

=== Pittsburgh Pirates ===
On July 7, 2010, Pittsburgh Pirates acquired Gallagher from the Padres for cash considerations. After the season, the Pirates outrighted Gallagher off of the 40-man roster to Triple-A, but invited him to 2011 spring training. He spent the entire season with the Triple-A Indianapolis Indians.

=== Cincinnati Reds ===
Gallagher signed a minor league contract with the Cincinnati Reds on December 9, 2011. He spent the year with the Triple-A Louisville Bats, where in 26 starts, he went 10–9 with a 4.92 ERA, striking out 84 in 139 innings.

=== Sugar Land Skeeters ===
On April 3, 2013, Gallagher signed with the Sugar Land Skeeters of the independent Atlantic League of Professional Baseball, where he made 4 starts before his contract was purchased by the Rockies.

=== Colorado Rockies ===
Gallagher signed a minor league contract with the Colorado Rockies on May 14, 2013. He was assigned to the Double-A Tulsa Drillers, where he made 12 starts, going 4–5 with a 3.00 ERA and 50 strikeouts before being promoted to the Triple-A Colorado Springs Sky Sox on July 26. Marshall made 7 starts with Colorado Springs. In 23 overall starts in 2013, he went 6–8 with a 3.95 ERA, striking out 79 in 114 innings pitched. Marshall elected free agency on November 4.

=== Sugar Land Skeeters (second stint) ===
Gallagher returned to the Sugar Land Skeeters of the Atlantic League of Professional Baseball for the 2014 season. In 13 games (12 starts) for Sugar Land, he compiled a 3–4 record and 4.98 ERA with 33 strikeouts across 68 2/3 innings pitched.

Gallagher made 27 starts for the Skeeters during the 2015 season, registering a 6–9 record and 3.51 ERA with 128 strikeouts over 159 innings of work. He 27 starts for Sugar Land in 2016 as well, posting a 10–8 record and 3.79 ERA with 112 strikeouts across 154 1/3 innings pitched. Marshall became a free agent following the season.

== Post-playing career ==
After his stint with the Skeeters, Gallagher served as a scout for the Kansas City Royals from 2016 through 2018. From 2020 to 2022, he was the Director of Pitching at the 180 Performance Center. According to his personal website, he is currently a private pitching instructor in Cedar Park, Texas.
