= 2008 Atlanta Braves season =

2008 Atlanta Braves
- League: National League
- Division: East
- Ballpark: Turner Field
- City: Atlanta
- Record: 72–90 (.444)
- Divisional place: 4th
- Owners: Liberty Media; John Malone
- General managers: Frank Wren
- Managers: Bobby Cox
- Television: SportsSouth; FSN South; WPCH-TV (Peachtree TV); Skip Caray through August 2, Pete Van Wieren, Chip Caray, Joe Simpson, Jon Sciambi, John Smoltz,
- Radio: 94.9 FM WUBL; 640 AM WGST; Skip Caray through August 2, Pete Van Wieren, Chip Caray, Joe Simpson, Mark Lemke

The 2008 Atlanta Braves season was the 43rd in Atlanta and the 138th overall. The Braves attempted to reclaim a postseason berth for the first time since 2005. They were once again skippered by Bobby Cox, now in his 19th season (of his second stint) managing Atlanta. As a result of John Schuerholz taking the position of team president, the Braves entered the offseason with Frank Wren as their general manager.

The team wore a patch on the right sleeve "BEACH" in honor of former Braves player and bench coach Jim Beauchamp, who had died after the previous season ended.

2008 saw the departure of two of the team's longtime radio and television announcers. Skip Caray died on August 3, while Pete van Wieren announced his retirement on October 21. Both men had been broadcasting for the team since 1976.

== Offseason ==
=== October ===
- October 25: Claimed RHP Chris Resop off waivers from the Los Angeles Angels of Anaheim and designated RHP Chad Paronto for assignment.
- October 29: Acquired OF Gorkys Hernández and RHP Jair Jurrjens from the Detroit Tigers in exchange for SS Édgar Rentería and cash considerations. Sent RHP Chad Paronto outright to Triple-A Richmond. He refused the assignment, becoming a free agent.

=== November ===
- November 16: Acquired OF Josh Anderson from the Houston Astros in exchange for RHP Óscar Villarreal.
- November 19: Signed Tom Glavine to a one-year, $8 million contract.
- November 20: Designated INF Pete Orr for assignment. Orr was later released by the organization on November 28.
- November 30: Designated RHP Lance Cormier for assignment.

=== December ===
- December 4: Acquired LHP Will Ohman and INF Omar Infante from the Chicago Cubs in exchange for RHP José Ascanio.
- December 4: Designated OF Willie Harris for assignment. Harris was released and became a free agent on December 12.
- December 17: Signed C Javy López to a minor-league contract and an invitation to spring training.

=== January ===
- January 14: Acquired CF Mark Kotsay from the Oakland Athletics in exchange for RHP Joey Devine and minor league RHP Jamie Richmond.
- January 17: Acquired LHP Jeff Ridgway from the Tampa Bay Rays in exchange for utility infielder Willy Aybar and minor league infielder Chase Fontaine.

=== March ===
- March 22: Javy López announces he will retire after being told he will not make the opening day roster.
- March 26: Tyler Yates traded to the Pittsburgh Pirates in exchange for minor league pitcher Todd Redmond.
- March 28: Rubén Gotay claimed off of waivers from the New York Mets.
- March 31: Scott Spiezio signed to minor league contract. Released April 12.

=== May ===
- May 5: Acquired utility-man Greg Norton from the Seattle Mariners for cash considerations.

== Regular season ==
=== Season standings ===
==== National League East ====
NL East
Team	W	L	Pct.	GB	Home	Road
Philadelphia Phillies	92	70	.568	—	48‍–‍33	44‍–‍37
New York Mets	89	73	.549	3	48‍–‍33	41‍–‍40
Florida Marlins	84	77	.522	7½	45‍–‍36	39‍–‍41
Atlanta Braves	72	90	.444	20	43‍–‍38	29‍–‍52
Washington Nationals	59	102	.366	32½	34‍–‍46	25‍–‍56

==== Record vs. opponents ====
2008 National League record Source: MLB Standings Grid – 2008
Team	AZ	ATL	CHC	CIN	COL	FLA	HOU	LAD	MIL	NYM	PHI	PIT	SD	SF	STL	WAS	AL
Arizona	–	3–5	2–4	2–4	15–3	2–7	4–2	8–10	2–5	3–3	3–4	4–3	10–8	11–7	3–4	4–2	6–9
Atlanta	5–3	–	0–6	3–3	4–3	10–8	3–3	4–2	3–6	11–7	4–14	2–5	5–1	2–5	2–5	6–12	8–7
Chicago	4–2	6–0	–	8–7	5–1	4–3	8–9	5–2	9–7	4–2	3–4	14–4	5–2	4–3	9–6	3–3	6–9
Cincinnati	4–2	3–3	7–8	–	1–5	6–2	3–12	1–7	10–8	3–4	3–5	6–9	4–3	5–1	5–10	4–3	9–6
Colorado	3–15	3–4	1–5	5–1	–	5–3	3–3	8–10	4–3	3–6	0–5	5–2	9–9	11–7	3–4	4–3	7–8
Florida	7–2	8–10	3–4	2–6	3–5	–	4–2	3–4	5–1	8–10	10–8	3–2	4–2	3–3	2–5	14–3	5–10
Houston	2–4	3–3	9–8	12–3	3–3	2–4	–	4–3	7–8	5–2	3–4	8–8	3–3	7–1	7–8	4–2	7–11
Los Angeles	10–8	2–4	2–5	7–1	10–8	4–3	3–4	–	4–2	3–4	4–4	5–2	11–7	9–9	2–4	3–3	5–10
Milwaukee	5–2	6–3	7–9	8–10	3–4	1–5	8–7	2–4	–	2–4	1–5	14–1	4–3	6–0	10–5	6–2	7–8
New York	3–3	7–11	2–4	4–3	6–3	10–8	2–5	4–3	4–2	–	11–7	4–3	2–5	5–1	4–3	12–6	9–6
Philadelphia	4–3	14–4	4–3	5–3	5–0	8–10	4–3	4–4	5–1	7–11	–	4–2	4–2	3–3	5–4	12–6	4–11
Pittsburgh	3–4	5–2	4–14	9–6	2–5	2–3	8–8	2–5	1–14	3–4	2–4	–	3–4	4–2	10–7	3–4	6–9
San Diego	8–10	1–5	2–5	3–4	9–9	2–4	3–3	7–11	3–4	5–2	2–4	4–3	–	5–13	1–6	5–1	3–15
San Francisco	7–11	5–2	3–4	1–5	7–11	3–3	1–7	9–9	0–6	1–5	3–3	2–4	13–5	–	4–3	7–0	6–12
St. Louis	4–3	5–2	6–9	10–5	4–3	5–2	8–7	4–2	5–10	3–4	4–5	7–10	6–1	3–4	–	5–1	7–8
Washington	2–4	12–6	3–3	3–4	3–4	3–14	2–4	3–3	2–6	6–12	6–12	4–3	1–5	0–7	1–5	–	8–10

=== Roster ===
2008 Atlanta Braves
Roster
Pitchers: 46 Manny Acosta; 30 Jeff Bennett; 56 Blaine Boyer; 26 Francisley Bueno; 38 Buddy Carlyle; 33 Matt DeSalvo; 34 Elmer Dessens; 47 Tom Glavine; 51 Mike Gonzalez; 32 Mike Hampton; 15 Tim Hudson; 36 Chuck James; 65 Jorge Julio; 49 Jair Jurrjens; 50 Charlie Morton; 58 Peter Moylan; 48 Vladimir Núñez; 13 Will Ohman; 61 James Parr; 48 Chris Resop; 37 Jo-Jo Reyes; 40 Jeff Ridgway; 34 Royce Ring; 29 John Smoltz; 39 Rafael Soriano; 48 Phil Stockman; 54 Julián Tavárez	Catchers: 16 Brian McCann; 27 Corky Miller; 18 Clint Sammons; Infielders: 19 Yunel Escobar; 8 Rubén Gotay; 2 Kelly Johnson; 10 Chipper Jones; 22 Casey Kotchman; 1 Brent Lillibridge; 14 Martín Prado; 24 Mark Teixeira	Outfielders: 24 Josh Anderson; 18 Gregor Blanco; 23 Matt Diaz; 7 Jeff Francoeur; 4 Omar Infante; 11 Mark Kotsay; 20 Greg Norton; 26 Jason Perry; Other batters: 5 Brayan Peña	Manager: 6 Bobby Cox; Coaches: 52 Chino Cadahia (bench); 17 Glenn Hubbard (first base); 45 Roger McDowell (pitching); 9 Terry Pendleton (hitting); 12 Eddie Pérez (bullpen); 43 Brian Snitker (third base)

=== Game log ===
Legend
Braves Win	Braves Loss	Game postponed

2008 Regular Season Game Log
March (0–2)

#	Date	Opponent	Score	Win	Loss	Save	Attendance	Time	Record	TV	Radio
1	March 30	@ Nationals	2–3	Rauch (1–0)	Moylan (0–1)		39,389	2:22	0–1	ESPN	WGST/WUBL
2	March 31	Pirates	11–12 (12)	Osoria (1–0)	Boyer (0–1)		45,269	4:28	0–2	WPCH	WGST/WUBL

April (12–13)

#	Date	Opponent	Score	Win	Loss	Save	Attendance	Time	Record	TV	Radio
3	April 2	Pirates	10–2	Jurrjens (1–0)	Gorzelanny (0–1)		17,893	2:57	1–2	FSN South	WGST/WUBL
4	April 3	Pirates	3–4 (12)	Yates (1–0)	Resop (0–1)	Capps (1)	19,240	3:21	1–3	SportsSouth	WGST/WUBL
—	April 4	Mets	Rescheduled for May 20						1–3		
6	April 5	Mets	11–5	Hudson (1–0)	Maine (0–1)		36,130	3:27	2–3	FOX	WGST/WUBL
7	April 6	Mets	3–1	Smoltz (1–0)	Santana (1–1)	Soriano (1)	39,414	2:35	3–3	SportsSouth	WGST/WUBL
8	April 7	@ Rockies	1–2	Herges (1–0)	Boyer (0–2)	Corpas (2)	24,304	2:05	3–4	SportsSouth	WGST/WUBL
9	April 8	@ Rockies	3–4	Jiménez (1–1)	Jurrjens (1–1)	Corpas (3)	24,640	2:24	3–5	SportsSouth	WGST/WUBL
10	April 9	@ Rockies	6–12	Redman (1–1)	James (0–1)		23,210	2:44	3–6	FSN South	WGST/WUBL
—	April 10	@ Rockies	Rescheduled for June 16						3–6		
12	April 11	@ Nationals	3–0	Hudson (2–0)	Chico (0–2)	Moylan (1)	28,051	2:15	4–6	SportsSouth	WGST/WUBL
13	April 12	@ Nationals	10–2	Smoltz (2–0)	Lannan (0–2)		32,532	2:44	5–6	SportsSouth	WGST/WUBL
14	April 13	@ Nationals	4–5	Redding (2–1)	Bennett (0–1)	Rauch (2)	29,151	3:06	5–7	SportsSouth	WGST/WUBL
15	April 15	@ Marlins	0–4	Olsen (2–0)	Jurrjens (1–2)		10,462	2:36	5–8	SportsSouth	WGST/WUBL
16	April 16	@ Marlins	5–6	Hendrickson (3–1)	Hudson (2–1)	Gregg (3)	10,712	2:41	5–9	FSN South	WGST/WUBL
17	April 17	@ Marlins	8–0	Smoltz (3–0)	Nolasco (1–1)		11,237	2:53	6–9	SportsSouth	WGST/WUBL
18	April 18	Dodgers	6–1	Ohman (1–0)	Lowe (1–1)		38,250	3:03	7–9	WPCH	WGST/WUBL
19	April 19	Dodgers	4–1	James (1–1)	Billingsley (0–3)	Acosta (1)	40,451	2:40	8–9	FOX	WGST/WUBL
20	April 20	Dodgers	6–1	Jurrjens (2–2)	Kuroda (1–2)		36,772	3:11	9–9	SportsSouth	WGST/WUBL
21	April 21	Nationals	7–3	Hudson (3–1)	Chico (0–4)		16,706	2:50	10–9	SportsSouth	WGST/WUBL
22	April 22	Nationals	0–6	Lannan (1–2)	Smoltz (3–1)		23,482	2:48	10–10	SportsSouth	WGST/WUBL
23	April 23	Marlins	2–7	Miller (1–2)	Bennett (0–1)		19,852	3:05	10–11	FSN South	WGST/WUBL
24	April 24	Marlins	7–4	James (2–1)	Badenhop (0–2)	Acosta (2)	19,903	2:34	11–11	SportsSouth	WGST/WUBL
25	April 25	@ Mets	6–3	Jurrjens (3–2)	Pelfrey (2–1)		52,495	3:06	12–11	WPCH	WGST/WUBL
26	April 26	@ Mets	3–4	Maine (2–2)	Hudson (3–2)	Wagner (5)	51,339	2:56	12–12	SportsSouth	WGST/WUBL
27	April 27	@ Mets	3–6	Figueroa (2–1)	Smoltz (3–2)	Wagner (6)	53,487	2:46	12–13	SportsSouth	WGST/WUBL
28	April 29	@ Nationals	3–6	Rivera (2–1)	Boyer (0–3)	Rauch (5)	25,285	2:43	12–14	SportsSouth	WGST/WUBL
29	April 30	@ Nationals	2–3	Rivera (3–1)	Acosta (0–1)		29,473	3:17	12–15	SportsSouth	WGST/WUBL

May (17–12)

#	Date	Opponent	Score	Win	Loss	Save	Attendance	Time	Record	TV	Radio
30	May 2	Reds	2–0	Hudson (4–2)	Vólquez (4–1)		32,057	2:21	13–15	WPCH	WGST/WUBL
31	May 3	Reds	9–1	Reyes (1–0)	Belisle (1–2)		37,969	2:58	14–15	WPCH	WGST/WUBL
32	May 4	Reds	14–7	Ring (1–0)	Arroyo (1–4)		33,750	3:16	15–15	SportsSouth	WGST/WUBL
33	May 6	Padres	5–3	Jurrjens (4–2)	Young (2–3)	Bennett (1)	21,657	2:42	16–15	SportsSouth	WGST/WUBL
34	May 7	Padres	5–2	Hudson (5–2)	Wolf (2–2)	Acosta (2)	25,194	2:22	17–15	FSN South	WGST/WUBL
35	May 8	Padres	5–4	Acosta (1–1)	Thatcher (0–4)		28,337	3:19	18–15	SportsSouth	WGST/WUBL
36	May 9	@ Pirates	2–3	Grabow (2–1)	Bennett (0–2)		21,050	2:55	18–16	SportsSouth	WGST/WUBL
37	May 10	@ Pirates	2–5	Gorzelanny (3–3)	James (2–2)	Capps (9)	28,141	2:10	18–17	SportsSouth	WGST/WUBL
–	May 11	@ Pirates	Rescheduled for May 12						18–17		
39	May 12	@ Pirates	0–5	Duke (2–2)	Jurrjens (4–3)				18–18	SportsSouth	WGST/WUBL
38	May 12	@ Pirates	8–1	Hudson (6–2)	Van Benschoten (0–1)		16,669	2:40	19–18	SportsSouth	WGST/WUBL
40	May 13	@ Phillies	4–5	Kendrick (3–2)	Reyes (0–1)	Lidge (10)	44,101	2:41	19–19	SportsSouth	WGST/WUBL
41	May 14	@ Phillies	8–6	Glavine (1–1)	Myers (2–4)	Boyer (1)	36,001	2:51	20–19	FSN South	WGST/WUBL
42	May 15	@ Phillies	0–5	Hamels (5–3)	James (2–3)		34,120	2:13	20–20	SportsSouth	WGST/WUBL
43	May 16	Athletics	3–2	Acosta (2–1)	Embree (1–2)		31,004	3:02	21–20	WPCH	WGST/WUBL
44	May 17	Athletics	4–5	Harden (2–0)	Hudson (6–3)		38,324	2:49	21–21	WPCH	WGST/WUBL
45	May 18	Athletics	5–2	Reyes (2–1)	Duchscherer (3–3)		31,025	2:47	22–21	SportsSouth	WGST/WUBL
5	May 20	Mets	6–1	Glavine (2–1)	Maine (5–3)		26,873	2:44	23–21	WPCH	WGST/WUBL
46	May 20	Mets	6–2	Campillo (1–0)	Vargas (0–2)	Acosta (3)	25,590	2:30	24–21	SportsSouth	WGST/WUBL
47	May 21	Mets	11–4	Jurrjens (5–3)	Pelfrey (2–5)		30,335	3:14	25–21	FSN South	WGST/WUBL
48	May 22	Mets	4–2	Hudson (7–3)	Santana (5–3)	Ohman (1)	30,348	2:21	26–21	WPCH	WGST/WUBL
49	May 23	D-backs	1–11	Davis (2–1)	Reyes (2–2)		27,263	2:33	26–22	WPCH	WGST/WUBL
50	May 24	D-backs	3–1	Boyer (1–3)	Slaten (0–1)		36,263	2:39	27–22	FOX	WGST/WUBL
51	May 25	D-backs	3–9	Owings (6–2)	Glavine (2–2)		35,628	3:24	27–23	SportsSouth	WGST/WUBL
52	May 26	D-backs	7–3	Acosta (3–1)	Webb (9–2)		29,635	3:07	28–23	SportsSouth	WGST/WUBL
53	May 27	@ Brewers	2–3	Torres (4–1)	Bennett (0–3)		28,872	2:26	28–24	SportsSouth	WGST/WUBL
54	May 28	@ Brewers	0–1	Suppan (3–4)	Reyes (2–3)	Torres (4)	31,612	2:15	28–25	FSN South	WGST/WUBL
55	May 29	@ Brewers	8–1	Campillo (2–0)	McClung (2–2)		33,334	2:56	29–25	SportsSouth	WGST/WUBL
56	May 30	@ Reds	2–3 (11)	Mercker (1–0)	Ring (1–1)		37,015	3:07	29–26	SportsSouth	WGST/WUBL
57	May 31	@ Reds	7–8 (10)	Cordero (2–0)	Acosta (3–2)		38,585	3:43	29–27	FOX	WGST/WUBL

June (11–16)

#	Date	Opponent	Score	Win	Loss	Save	Attendance	Time	Record	TV	Radio
58	June 1	@ Reds	2–6	Cueto (4–5)	Hudson (7–4)		35,942	2:42	29–28	SportsSouth	WGST/WUBL
59	June 2	Marlins	7–5 (10)	Ohman (2–0)	Kensing (3–1)		20,896	3:01	30–28	SportsSouth	WGST/WUBL
60	June 3	Marlins	5–4	Ohman (3–0)	Lindstrom (1–0)	Soriano (2)	25,476	2:59	31–28	WPCH	WGST/WUBL
61	June 4	Marlins	4–6	Miller (2–2)	Acosta (3–3)	Gregg (11)	26,917	3:00	31–29	WPCH	WGST/WUBL
62	June 5	Marlins	7–5	Jurrjens (6–3)	Nolasco (5–4)	Soriano (3)	27,238	2:53	32–29	WPCH	WGST/WUBL
63	June 6	Phillies	3–4 (10)	Gordon (5–2)	Acosta (3–4)	Lidge (16)	34,074	3:36	32–30	WPCH	WGST/WUBL
64	June 7	Phillies	2–6	Romero (4–1)	Reyes (2–4)		43,854	3:02	32–31	WPCH	WGST/WUBL
65	June 8	Phillies	3–6	C. Durbin (2–1)	Boyer (1–4)	Lidge (17)	33,370	3:09	32–32	SportsSouth	WGST/WUBL
66	June 10	@ Cubs	5–10	Lilly (6–5)	Glavine (2–3)		41,624	2:50	32–33	WPCH	WGST/WUBL
67	June 11	@ Cubs	2–7	Dempster (8–2)	Bennett (0–4)		41,497	2:25	32–34	FSN South	WGST/WUBL
68	June 12	@ Cubs	2–3 (11)	Wood (3–1)	Acosta (3–5)		41,517	3:22	32–35	WPCH	WGST/WUBL
69	June 13	@ Angels	5–2	Reyes (3–4)	Garland (6–4)	Bennett (2)	43,919	2:17	33–35	SportsSouth	WGST/WUBL
70	June 14	@ Angels	9–4	Morton (1–0)	Santana (8–3)		43,894	3:00	34–35	SportsSouth	WGST/WUBL
71	June 15	@ Angels	0–2	Saunders (10–3)	Campillo (2–1)	Rodríguez (28)	43,723	2:14	34–36	ESPN	WGST/WUBL
11	June 16	@ Rockies	7–1	Jurrjens (7–3)	Jiménez (1–7)		25,120	3:02	35–36	SportsSouth	WGST/WUBL
72	June 17	@ Rangers	5–7	Padilla (9–3)	Hudson (7–5)	Wilson (14)	33,558	2:40	35–37	WPCH	WGST/WUBL
73	June 18	@ Rangers	5–2	Bennett (1–4)	Wilson (0–2)	González (1)	38,545	2:50	36–37	FSN South	WGST/WUBL
74	June 19	@ Rangers	4–5	Wright (4–2)	Boyer (1–5)		28,853	3:04	36–38	WPCH	WGST/WUBL
75	June 20	Mariners	2–10	Rowland-Smith (1–1)	Campillo (2–2)		40,268	2:53	36–39	WPCH	WGST/WUBL
76	June 21	Mariners	5–4	Boyer (2–5)	Batista (3–9)		47,158	3:10	37–39	WPCH	WGST/WUBL
77	June 22	Mariners	8–3	Hudson (8–5)	Silva (3–9)		30,965	2:25	38–39	SportsSouth	WGST/WUBL
78	June 23	Brewers	1–4	Sheets (9–1)	Reyes (3–5)		25,661	2:14	38–40	FSN South	WGST/WUBL
79	June 24	Brewers	3–4	Bush (4–7)	Morton (1–1)	Torres (13)	29,224	2:31	38–41	WPCH	WGST/WUBL
80	June 25	Brewers	4–2	Campillo (3–2)	Suppan (4–6)	González (2)	34,829	2:29	39–41	WPCH	WGST/WUBL
81	June 27	@ Blue Jays	4–0	Jurrjens (8–3)	McGowan (6–6)		24,282	2:33	40–41	SportsSouth	WGST/WUBL
82	June 28	@ Blue Jays	5–9	Parrish (1–0)	Hudson (8–6)		28,518	2:58	40–42	SportsSouth	WGST/WUBL
83	June 29	@ Blue Jays	0–1	Burnett (8–7)	Reyes (3–6)	Ryan (16)	30,514	2:35	40–43	SportsSouth	WGST/WUBL

July (10–15)

#	Date	Opponent	Score	Win	Loss	Save	Attendance	Time	Record	TV	Radio
84	July 1	Phillies	3–8	Kendrick (8–3)	Morton (1–2)		29,206	3:07	40–44	WPCH	WGST/WUBL
85	July 2	Phillies	3–7	Eaton (3–6)	Campillo (3–3)		30,138	3:14	40–45	FSN South	WGST/WUBL
86	July 3	Phillies	1–4	Hamels (9–5)	Jurrjens (8–4)	Gordon (2)	28,805	2:21	40–46	WPCH	WGST/WUBL
87	July 4	Astros	6–2	Hudson (9–6)	Moehler (4–4)		48,045	2:34	41–46	WPCH	WGST/WUBL
88	July 5	Astros	1–6	Sampson (4–3)	Reyes (3–7)		37,049	2:32	41–47	WPCH	WGST/WUBL
89	July 6	Astros	7–6 (17)	Ring (2–1)	Byrdak (2–1)		24,169	5:35	42–47	SportsSouth	WGST/WUBL
90	July 7	@ Dodgers	0–3	Kuroda (5–6)	Campillo (3–4)		39,896	2:03	42–48	SportsSouth	WGST/WUBL
91	July 8	@ Dodgers	9–3	Jurrjens (9–4)	Billingsley (8–8)		39,702	3:03	43–48	SportsSouth	WGST/WUBL
92	July 9	@ Dodgers	1–2	Lowe (7–8)	Hudson (9–7)	Saito (17)	39,815	2:00	43–49	FSN South	WGST/WUBL
93	July 11	@ Padres	0–4	Peavy (7–5)	Reyes (3–8)	Hoffman (17)	40,232	2:29	43–50	SportsSouth	WGST/WUBL
94	July 12	@ Padres	4–1	Morton (2–2)	Maddux (3–8)	González (3)	42,438	2:53	44–50	SportsSouth	WGST/WUBL
95	July 13	@ Padres	12–3	Campillo (4–4)	Wolf (6–9)		31,347	2:26	45–50	SportsSouth	WGST/WUBL
–	July 15	2008 Major League Baseball All-Star Game in New York									
96	July 18	Nationals	7–6	Hudson (10–7)	Redding (7–4)	González (4)	39,861	2:32	46–50	WPCH	WGST/WUBL
97	July 19	Nationals	2–8	Lannan (6–9)	Jurrjens (9–5)		43,285	2:46	46–51	WPCH	WGST/WUBL
98	July 20	Nationals	6–15	Pérez (3–7)	Reyes (3–9)		29,320	3:25	46–52	SportsSouth	WGST/WUBL
99	July 21	@ Marlins	4–0	Campillo (5–4)	Volstad (2–1)		14,155	2:24	47–52	SportsSouth	WGST/WUBL
100	July 22	@ Marlins	0–4	VandenHurk (1–1)	Morton (2–3)		14,721	2:33	47–53	SportsSouth	WGST/WUBL
101	July 23	@ Marlins	9–4	Hudson (11–7)	Nolasco (10–6)		16,068	2:52	48–53	FSN South	WGST/WUBL
102	July 25	@ Phillies	8–2	Jurrjens (10–5)	Kendrick (8–5)		45,114	2:50	49–53	WPCH	WGST/WUBL
103	July 26	@ Phillies	9–10	Eaton (4–8)	Boyer (2–6)	Lidge (23)	45,107	3:12	49–54	FOX	WGST/WUBL
104	July 27	@ Phillies	10–12	Condrey (3–2)	Tavárez (0–3)	Lidge (24)	45,096	3:16	49–55	SportsSouth	WGST/WUBL
105	July 28	Cardinals	3–12	Looper (10–8)	Morton (2–4)		28,705	2:52	49–56	SportsSouth	WGST/WUBL
106	July 29	Cardinals	3–8	Franklin (4–4)	Soriano (0–1)		29,541	3:08	49–57	WPCH	WGST/WUBL
107	July 30	Cardinals	2–7	Thompson (4–2)	Jurrjens (10–6)	Villone (1)	35,257	3:18	49–58	FSN South	WGST/WUBL
108	July 31	Cardinals	9–4	Bennett (2–4)	Piñeiro (3–5)		40,653	2:44	50–58	WPCH	WGST/WUBL

August (9–20)

#	Date	Opponent	Score	Win	Loss	Save	Attendance	Time	Record	TV	Radio
109	August 1	Brewers	0–9	Suppan (6–7)	James (2–4)		32,238	2:44	50–59	WPCH	WGST/WUBL
110	August 2	Brewers	2–4	Sabathia (11–8)	Morton (2–5)	Torres (21)	42,096	2:32	50–60	FOX	WGST/WUBL
111	August 3	Brewers	5–0	Campillo (6–4)	Sheets (10–5)		29,177	2:34	51–60	SportsSouth	WGST/WUBL
112	August 4	@ Giants	2–4	Cain (7–9)	Jurrjens (10–7)	Wilson (31)	37,473	2:40	51–61	SportsSouth	WGST/WUBL
113	August 5	@ Giants	11–4	Hampton (1–0)	Sánchez (8–8)		36,098	2:55	52–61	SportsSouth	WGST/WUBL
114	August 6	@ Giants	2–3	Lincecum (12–3)	James (2–5)	Wilson (32)	39,955	2:14	52–62	FSN South	WGST/WUBL
115	August 7	@ D-backs	6–4	Morton (3–5)	Petit (1–3)	Gonzalez (5)	27,798	2:49	53–62	SportsSouth	WGST/WUBL
116	August 8	@ D-backs	11–6	Campillo (7–4)	Davis (4–7)	Bennett (3)	27,977	3:05	54–62	SportsSouth	WGST/WUBL
117	August 9	@ D-backs	11–4	Jurrjens (11–7)	Haren (12–6)		36,269	3:16	55–62	SportsSouth	WGST/WUBL
118	August 10	@ D-backs	1–6	Webb (17–4)	Hampton (1–1)		35,862	2:29	55–63	SportsSouth	WGST/WUBL
–	August 12	Cubs	Rescheduled for August 13						55–63		
119	August 13	Cubs	2–10	Marquis (8–7)	Morton (3–6)		27,220	3:24	55–64	WPCH	WGST/WUBL
120	August 13	Cubs	0–8	Harden (7–2)	Campillo (7–5)		33,714	2:53	55–65	FSN South	WGST/WUBL
121	August 14	Cubs	7–11	Lilly (12–6)	Glavine (2–4)		36,365	3:10	55–66	FSN South	WGST/WUBL
122	August 15	Giants	1–5	Cain (8–9)	Jurrjens (11–8)		30,682	2:44	55–67	WPCH	WGST/WUBL
123	August 16	Giants	11–5	Hampton (2–1)	Palmer (0–1)		41,893	3:18	56–67	WPCH	WGST/WUBL
124	August 17	Giants	1–3	Lincecum (13–3)	Morton (3–7)	Wilson (33)	30,503	3:04	56–68	SportsSouth	WGST/WUBL
125	August 18	Giants	0–5	Zito (7–15)	Campillo (7–6)		18,113	2:33	56–69	SportsSouth	WGST/WUBL
126	August 19	@ Mets	3–7	Heilman (3–7)	Bennett (2–5)		50,589	2:57	56–70	WPCH	WGST/WUBL
127	August 20	@ Mets	3–6	Pelfrey (12–8)	Jurrjens (11–9)		50,178	2:08	56–71	FSN South	WGST/WUBL
128	August 21	@ Mets	4–5	Ayala (2–8)	Núñez (0–1)		51,952	2:58	56–72	WPCH	WGST/WUBL
129	August 22	@ Cardinals	3–18	Wainwright (7–3)	Morton (3–8)	Piñeiro (1)	43,926	3:08	56–73	SportsSouth	WGST/WUBL
130	August 23	@ Cardinals	8–4	Carlyle (1–0)	McClellan (2–6)	Gonzalez (6)	44,074	3:13	57–73	FOX	WGST/WUBL
131	August 24	@ Cardinals	3–6	Looper (12–10)	Reyes (3–10)	Perez (5)	43,361	2:35	57–74	SportsSouth	WGST/WUBL
132	August 26	Marlins	10–9	Ohman (4–0)	Gregg (6–7)		17,539	3:31	58–74	SportsSouth	WGST/WUBL
133	August 27	Marlins	1–4	Johnson (4–0)	Hampton (2–2)		19,755	2:16	58–75	FSN South	WGST/WUBL
134	August 28	Marlins	4–2	Morton (4–8)	Sánchez (2–3)	Gonzalez (7)	20,155	2:27	59–75	SportsSouth	WGST/WUBL
135	August 29	@ Nationals	3–7	Pérez (6–10)	Campillo (7–7)	Hanrahan (7)	22,737	2:59	59–76	SportsSouth	WGST/WUBL
136	August 30	@ Nationals	8–9 (10)	Shell (1–1)	Núñez (0–2)		30,326	3:46	59–77	SportsSouth	WGST/WUBL
137	August 31	@ Nationals	4–8	Mock (1–3)	Dessens (0–1)		31,090	2:48	59–78	SportsSouth	WGST/WUBL

September (13–12)

#	Date	Opponent	Score	Win	Loss	Save	Attendance	Time	Record	TV	Radio
138	September 1	@ Marlins	3–4	Lindstrom (3–2)	Gonzalez (0–1)		12,209	2:44	59–79	SportsSouth	WGST/WUBL
139	September 2	@ Marlins	16–14	Julio (1–0)	Lindstrom (3–3)	Gonzalez (8)	14,092	3:44	60–79	SportsSouth	WGST/WUBL
140	September 3	@ Marlins	3–5	Waechter (4–2)	Ohman (4–1)	Nelson (1)	11,211	2:48	60–80	FSN South	WGST/WUBL
141	September 4	Nationals	2–0	Parr (1–0)	Martis (0–1)	Gonzalez (9)	18,708	2:31	61–80	FSN South	WGST/WUBL
142	September 5	Nationals	10–5	Jurrjens (12–9)	Bergmann (2–11)		25,064	2:55	62–80	WPCH	WGST/WUBL
143	September 6	Nationals	5–8 (10)	Hanrahan (6–3)	Gonzalez (0–2)	Shell (2)	34,369	2:53	62–81	SportsSouth	WGST/WUBL
144	September 7	Nationals	4–7 (14)	Shell (2–1)	Bennett (2–6)		30,753	4:34	62–82	SportsSouth	WGST/WUBL
145	September 9	Rockies	5–4 (10)	Tavárez (1–3)	Buchholz (6–6)		21,821	3:10	63–82	WPCH	WGST/WUBL
146	September 10	Rockies	9–5	Bennett (3–6)	Vizcaíno (1–1)		19,693	3:05	64–82	FSN South	WGST/WUBL
147	September 11	Rockies	8–4	Jurrjens (13–9)	Rusch (5–5)		20,039	2:50	65–82	WPCH	WGST/WUBL
–	September 12	@ Mets	Rescheduled for September 13						65–82		
149	September 13	@ Mets	3–2	Ridgway (1–0)	Schoeneweis (2–4)	Gonzalez (10)			66–82	FOX	WGST/WUBL
148	September 13	@ Mets	0–5	Niese (1–0)	Reyes (3–11)		54,705	2:44	66–83		WGST/WUBL
150	September 14	@ Mets	7–4	Julio (2–0)	Ayala (2–9)	Gonzalez (11)	56,039	3:29	67–83	SportsSouth	WGST/WUBL
151	September 16	Phillies	7–8	Madson (4–2)	Gonzalez (0–3)	Lidge (37)	30,319	3:41	67–84	SportsSouth	WGST/WUBL
152	September 17	Phillies	1–6	Happ (1–0)	Jurrjens (13–10)		32,821	2:49	67–85	FSN South	WGST/WUBL
153	September 18	Phillies	3–4	Hamels (14–9)	Hampton (2–3)	Lidge (38)	39,070	2:42	67–86	WPCH	WGST/WUBL
154	September 19	Mets	5–9	Feliciano (3–4)	Tavárez (1–4)		42,803	3:25	67–87	WPCH	WGST/WUBL
155	September 20	Mets	4–2	Campillo (8–7)	Martínez (5–6)	Gonzalez (12)	50,124	2:38	68–87	SportsSouth	WGST/WUBL
156	September 21	Mets	7–6	Julio (3–0)	Schoeneweis (2–5)	Gonzalez (13)	49,222	3:20	69–87	SportsSouth	WGST/WUBL
157	September 22	@ Phillies	2–6	Eyre (5–0)	Bennett (3–7)		36,796	2:37	69–88	WPCH	WGST/WUBL
158	September 23	@ Phillies	3–2	Hampton (3–3)	Hamels (14–10)	Gonzalez (14)	39,322	2:46	70–88	WPCH	WGST/WUBL
159	September 24	@ Phillies	10–4	Carlyle (2–0)	Myers (10–13)		41,430	3:16	71–88	FSN South	WGST/WUBL
160	September 26	@ Astros	4–5	Valverde (6–3)	Tavárez (1–5)		33,477	2:57	71–89	SportsSouth	WGST/WUBL
161	September 27	@ Astros	11–5	Núñez (1–2)	Backe (9–14)		37,491	2:57	72–89	SportsSouth	WGST/WUBL
162	September 28	@ Astros	1–3	Rodríguez (10–7)	Hampton (3–5)	Valverde (45)	37,113	2:19	72–90	SportsSouth	WGST/WUBL

== Player stats ==
=== Batting ===
Note: G = Games played; AB = At Bats; R = Runs scored; H = Hits; 2B = Doubles; 3B = Triples; HR = Home runs; RBI = Runs batted in; AVG = Batting average; SB = Stolen bases

Player	G	AB	R	H	2B	3B	HR	RBI	AVG	SB
Jeff Francoeur	155	599	70	143	33	3	11	71	.239	0
Kelly Johnson	150	547	86	157	39	6	11	71	.239	11
Brian McCann	145	509	68	153	42	1	23	87	.301	5
Gregor Blanco	144	430	52	108	14	4	1	38	.251	13
Yunel Escobar	136	514	71	148	24	2	10	60	.288	2
Chipper Jones	128	439	82	160	24	1	22	75	.364	4
Greg Norton	111	171	27	42	10	0	7	31	.246	0
Mark Teixeira	103	381	63	108	27	0	20	78	.283	0
Omar Infante	96	317	45	93	24	3	3	40	.293	0
Mark Kotsay	88	318	39	92	17	3	6	37	.289	2
Rubén Gotay	88	102	10	24	5	0	2	8	.235	1
Will Ohman	80	0	0	0	0	0	0	0	.000	0
Martin Prado	78	228	36	73	18	4	2	33	.320	3
Blaine Boyer	72	2	0	0	0	0	0	0	.000	0
Jeff Bennett	68	9	0	2	1	0	0	1	.222	0
Buddy Carlyle	45	9	1	2	0	0	0	0	.222	0
Casey Kotchman	43	152	18	36	4	1	2	20	.237	0
Matt Diaz	43	135	9	33	2	0	2	14	.244	4
Manny Acosta	43	5	0	0	0	0	0	0	.000	0
Brandon Jones	41	116	16	31	10	1	1	17	.267	1
Josh Anderson	40	136	21	40	7	1	3	12	.294	10
Royce Ring	39	0	0	0	0	0	0	0	.000	0
Jorge Campillo	38	45	4	8	1	0	0	2	.178	0
Julián Tavárez	0	0	0	0	0	0	0	0	.000	0
Jair Jurrjens	36	58	7	6	0	1	0	0	.103	0
Mike Gonzalez	34	1	0	0	0	0	0	0	.000	0
Corky Miller	31	60	4	5	0	0	1	5	.083	0
Brent Lillibridge	29	80	9	16	6	1	1	8	.200	2
Clint Sammons	23	54	2	8	0	0	1	4	.148	0
Vladimir Nunez	23	1	0	0	0	0	0	0	.000	0
Jo-Jo Reyes	22	30	2	4	2	0	0	2	.133	0
Tim Hudson	21	41	2	6	1	0	0	2	.146	0
Chris Resop	16	0	0	0	0	0	0	0	.000	0
Charlie Morton	14	17	0	1	1	0	0	0	.059	0
Brayan Peña	14	14	3	4	1	0	0	0	.286	0
Tom Glavine	14	19	2	2	0	0	0	1	.105	0
Rafael Soriano	14	0	0	0	0	0	0	0	.000	0
Mike Hampton	13	24	3	5	2	0	0	4	.208	0
Jorge Julio	12	0	0	0	0	0	0	0	.000	0
Jeff Ridgway	8	0	0	0	0	0	0	0	.000	0
Peter Moylan	7	0	0	0	0	0	0	0	.000	0
Chuck James	7	8	0	0	0	0	0	0	.000	0
James Parr	6	8	1	2	1	0	0	0	.250	0
Phil Stockman	6	0	0	0	0	0	0	0	.000	0
John Smoltz	6	8	0	0	0	0	0	1	.000	0
Elmer Dessens	4	0	0	0	0	0	0	0	.000	0
Jason Perry	4	17	0	2	0	1	0	1	.118	0
Matt DeSalvo	2	0	0	0	0	0	0	0	.000	0
Francisley Bueno	1	0	0	0	0	0	0	0	.000	0
Team totals	162	5604	753	1514	316	33	130	721	.270	58

=== Pitching ===
Note: W = Wins; L = Losses; ERA = Earned run average; G = Games pitched; GS = Games started; SV = Saves; IP = Innings pitched; R = Runs allowed; ER = Earned runs allowed; BB = Walks allowed; K = Strikeouts

Player	W	L	ERA	G	GS	SV	IP	R	ER	BB	K
Manny Acosta	3	5	3.57	46	0	3	53.0	25	21	26	31
Jeff Bennett	3	7	3.70	72	4	3	97.1	44	40	47	68
Blaine Boyer	2	6	5.88	76	0	1	72.0	51	47	25	67
Jorge Campillo	8	7	3.91	39	25	0	158.2	74	69	38	107
Buddy Carlyle	2	0	3.59	45	0	0	62.2	26	25	26	59
Tom Glavine	2	4	5.54	13	13	0	63.1	40	39	37	37
Mike Gonzalez	0	3	4.28	36	0	14	33.2	21	16	14	44
Mike Hampton	3	4	4.85	13	13	0	78.0	45	42	28	38
Tim Hudson	11	7	3.17	23	22	0	142.0	53	50	40	85
Chuck James	2	5	9.10	7	7	0	29.2	30	30	20	22
Jair Jurrjens	13	10	3.68	23	23	0	144.1	87	77	51	139
Charlie Morton	4	8	6.15	16	15	0	74.2	56	51	41	48
Peter Moylan	0	1	1.59	7	0	1	5.2	1	1	1	5
Vladimir Núñez	1	2	3.86	23	0	0	32.2	14	14	19	24
Will Ohman	4	1	3.68	83	0	1	58.2	27	24	22	53
Chris Resop	0	1	5.89	16	0	0	18.1	12	12	10	13
Jo-Jo Reyes	3	11	5.81	23	22	0	113.0	77	73	52	78
James Parr	1	0	4.84	5	5	0	22.1	13	12	9	14
Jeff Ridgway	1	0	3.72	10	0	0	9.2	4	4	1	8
Royce Ring	2	1	8.46	42	0	0	22.1	25	21	10	16
John Smoltz	3	2	2.57	6	5	0	28.0	8	8	8	36
Rafael Soriano	0	1	2.57	14	0	3	14.0	5	4	9	16
Phil Stockman	0	0	0.00	6	0	0	7.1	0	0	4	9
Julián Tavárez	1	4	4.71	43	0	0	42.0	30	22	19	45
Team totals	72	90	4.47	118	162	26	1048.2	519	714	586	1076

Source:2008 Atlanta Braves at Baseball Reference

== Farm system ==
Level	Team	League	Manager
AAA	Richmond Braves	International League	Dave Brundage
AA	Mississippi Braves	Southern League	Phillip Wellman
A	Myrtle Beach Pelicans	Carolina League	Rocket Wheeler
A	Rome Braves	South Atlantic League	Randy Ingle
Rookie	Danville Braves	Appalachian League	Paul Runge
Rookie	GCL Braves	Gulf Coast League	Luis Ortiz

LEAGUE CHAMPIONS: Mississippi
