= Vladimir Núñez =

Cuban baseball player (born 1975)

- Pitcher
- Born: March 15, 1975 (age 51); Havana, Cuba
- Batted: Right Threw: Right

MLB debut
- September 11, 1998, for the Arizona Diamondbacks

Last MLB appearance
- September 18, 2009, for the Atlanta Braves

MLB statistics
- Win–loss record: 21–34
- Earned run average: 4.83
- Strikeouts: 327
- Stats at Baseball Reference

Teams
- Arizona Diamondbacks (1998–1999); Florida Marlins (1999–2003); Colorado Rockies (2004); Atlanta Braves (2008–2009)

Vladimir Núñez Zarabaza (born March 15, 1975) is a Cuban former professional baseball relief pitcher. He is currently the pitching coach for the Gulf Coast League Braves of the Gulf Coast League. He played in Major League Baseball for the Arizona Diamondbacks, Florida Marlins, Colorado Rockies, and Atlanta Braves.

== Professional career ==
=== Atlanta Braves ===
On July 7, 2008, the Atlanta Braves purchased Núñez's contract from Triple-A Richmond after pitchers Manny Acosta and Jeff Bennett were placed on the disabled list. He made his Braves debut and first major league appearance since 2004 that night against the Los Angeles Dodgers, tossing a scoreless eighth inning with one strikeout. He re-signed with the Braves on November 25, 2008.

On October 12, 2009, the Atlanta Braves outrighted Núñez to the Gwinnett Braves and he elected free agency.

=== Coaching career ===
Núñez retired following the 2010 season and accepted the role of pitching coach for the Gulf Coast League Braves. After this he started coaching at his own organization as a head coach and pitching expert.

== See also ==
- List of baseball players who defected from Cuba
