= Pac-12 Conference Freshman of the Year =

Pac-12 Conference Freshman of the Year may refer to:

- Pac-12 Conference Men's Basketball Freshman of the Year
- Pac-12 Conference Offensive Freshman of the Year, one of the annual Pac-12 Conference football individual awards
- Pac-12 Conference Defensive Freshman of the Year, one of the annual Pac-12 Conference football individual awards

== See also ==
- Pac-12 Conference baseball awards, which includes a Newcomer of the Year award
