= Brent Lillibridge =

American baseball player (born 1983)

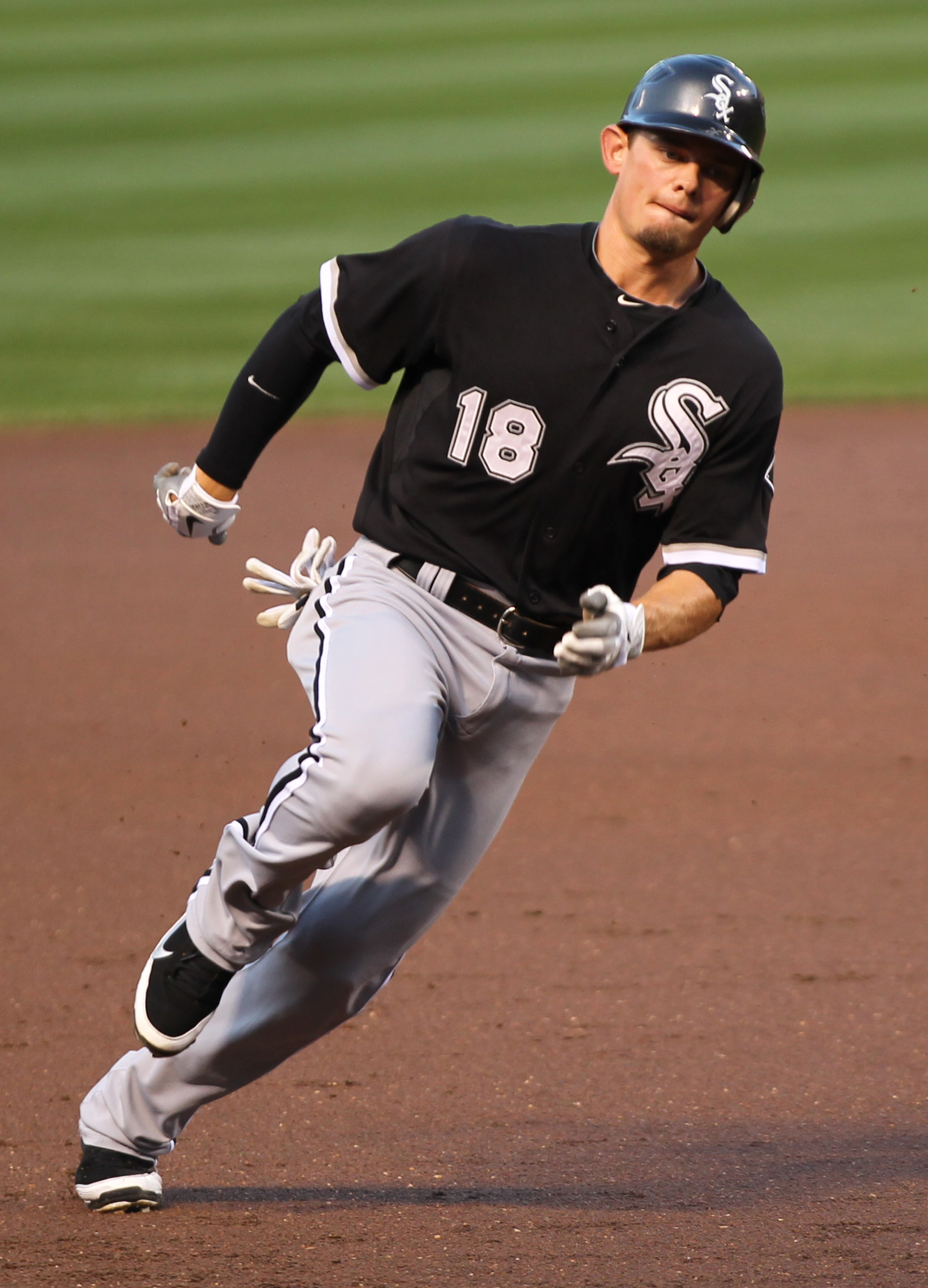
- Lillibridge with the Chicago White Sox in 2011
- Utility player
- Born: September 18, 1983 (age 43); Everett, Washington, U.S.
- Batted: Right Threw: Right

MLB debut
- April 26, 2008, for the Atlanta Braves

Last MLB appearance
- August 4, 2013, for the New York Yankees

MLB statistics
- Batting average: .205
- Home runs: 19
- Runs batted in: 71
- Stats at Baseball Reference

Teams
- Atlanta Braves (2008); Chicago White Sox (2009–2012); Boston Red Sox (2012); Cleveland Indians (2012); Chicago Cubs (2013); New York Yankees (2013)
Medals
Men's baseball
Representing United States
Pan American Games
| Silver medal – second place | 2003 Santo Domingo | Team competition |

Brent Stuart Lillibridge (born September 18, 1983) is an American former professional baseball utility player. He played in Major League Baseball (MLB) for the Atlanta Braves, Chicago White Sox, Boston Red Sox, Cleveland Indians, Chicago Cubs, and New York Yankees. He was known for his versatile playing skills and defensive prowess in the outfield. As a utility player, he started at every position except pitcher and catcher in his career.

== Amateur career ==
Lillibridge attended Henry M. Jackson High School in Mill Creek, Washington.

Lillibridge played college baseball for the Washington Huskies for three seasons and was named to the All-Pac-10 Conference Team three times. In 2004, he played collegiate summer baseball with the Harwich Mariners of the Cape Cod Baseball League.

== Professional career ==
=== Pittsburgh Pirates ===
The Pittsburgh Pirates selected Lillibridge in the fourth round, with the 121st overall selection, of the 2005 MLB draft.

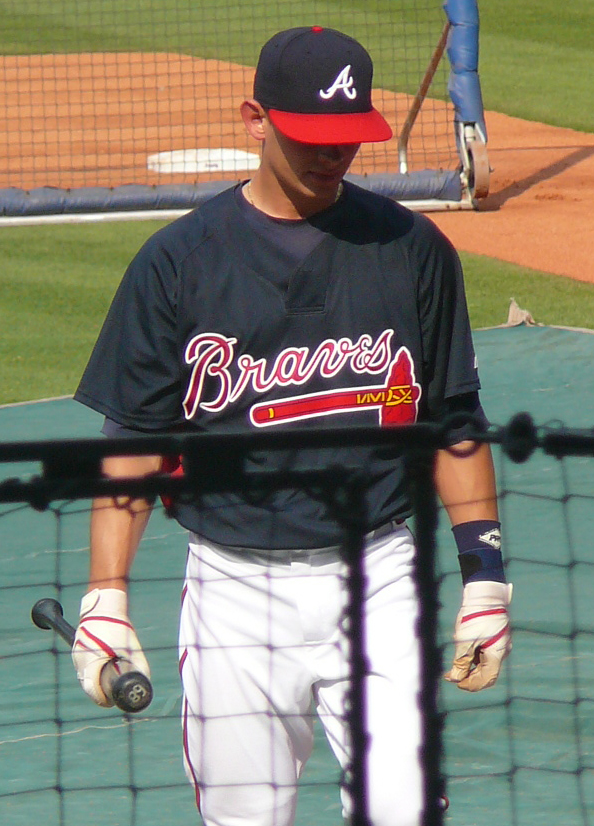
Lillibridge with Atlanta in 2008

=== Atlanta Braves ===
On January 17, 2007, the Pirates traded Lillibridge with Mike Gonzalez to the Atlanta Braves for Adam LaRoche and Jamie Romak.

Lillibridge began the 2008 season in Triple-A for the Richmond Braves. He played 19 games and batted .195 with one home run before his contract was purchased on April 26, 2008. He made his major league debut on that same day against the New York Mets and had four at bats and struck out three times. He doubled for his first major league hit on June 25 at Toronto. On July 12, in a game against the San Diego Padres at Petco Park, Lillibridge hit his first major league home run against relief pitcher Joe Thatcher.

=== Chicago White Sox ===
On December 4, 2008, the Braves traded Lillibridge, Tyler Flowers, Jon Gilmore, and Santos Rodriguez to the Chicago White Sox for Javier Vázquez and Boone Logan.

On April 11, 2011, Lillibridge hit a fifth-inning home run off Dallas Braden. It was the 10,000th home run hit by the White Sox in their 112-year history. Lillibridge garnered media coverage after he made two back-to-back, game-saving and game-ending defensive catches while playing right field on April 26 against the New York Yankees in Yankee Stadium.

=== Boston Red Sox ===
On June 24, 2012, Lillibridge was traded to the Boston Red Sox with Zach Stewart for Kevin Youkilis and cash. The Red Sox designated him for assignment on July 16.

=== Cleveland Indians ===
Boston traded Lillibridge to the Cleveland Indians on July 24, 2012 for minor league pitcher José De La Torre. On November 20, Lillibridge was sent outright to the Triple-A Columbus Clippers. Lillibridge declined the assignment to Columbus and was granted free agency on November 26.

=== Chicago Cubs ===
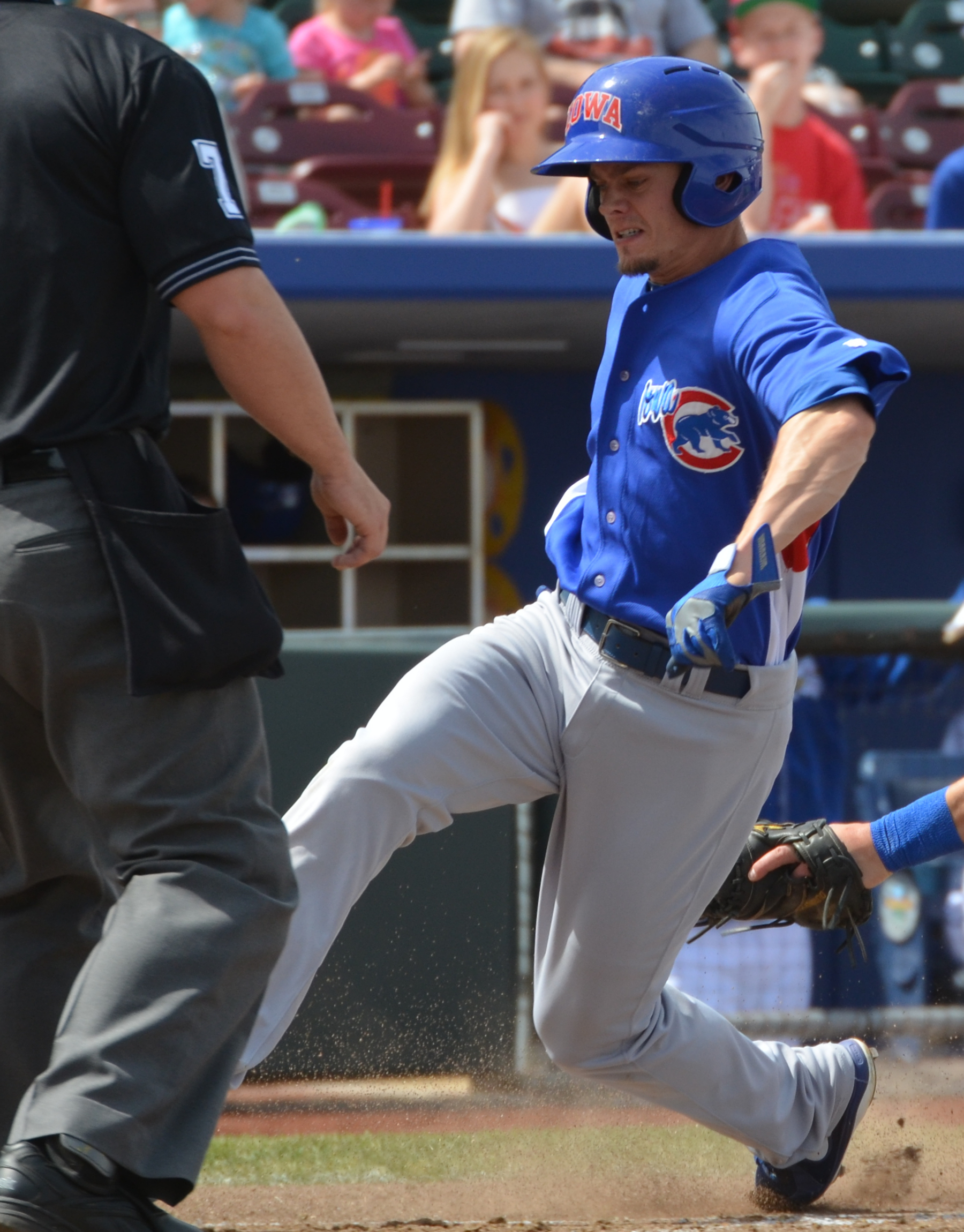
Lillibridge with the Iowa Cubs in 2013

On January 10, 2013, Lillibridge signed a minor league contract with the Chicago Cubs. On March 31, the Cubs added Lillibridge to their major league active roster. He was designated for assignment on April 16. On April 19, Lillibridge cleared waivers and was assigned to the Triple-A Iowa Cubs of the Pacific Coast League.

=== New York Yankees ===
On June 21, 2013, Lillibridge was traded to the New York Yankees for cash. The Yankees promoted Lillibridge to the major leagues when they placed Derek Jeter on the disabled list on July 19. He was designated for assignment to make room for the activation of Alex Rodriguez on August 5. He was outrighted from the 40-man roster and optioned to Triple-A on August 9. He declared free agency on October 1.

=== Texas Rangers ===
Lillibridge signed a minor league contract with the Texas Rangers on December 12, 2013. He was assigned to the minor league camp on March 22, 2014, failing to make the Rangers' Opening Day roster. He became a free agent after the 2014 season and had chosen to retire by the start of the 2015 season.

== Personal life ==
Lillibridge and his wife have three children. Lillibridge is a Christian, and his invitation to baseball player Steven Souza Jr. to attend church with him led to Souza's baptism.

Lillibridge's younger brother Kiel was his teammate with the Washington Huskies in 2005.

As of 2025, Lillibridge is one of the owners of a batting cage and baseball and softball training company in Washington state.
