= Blaine Boyer =

American baseball player (born 1981)

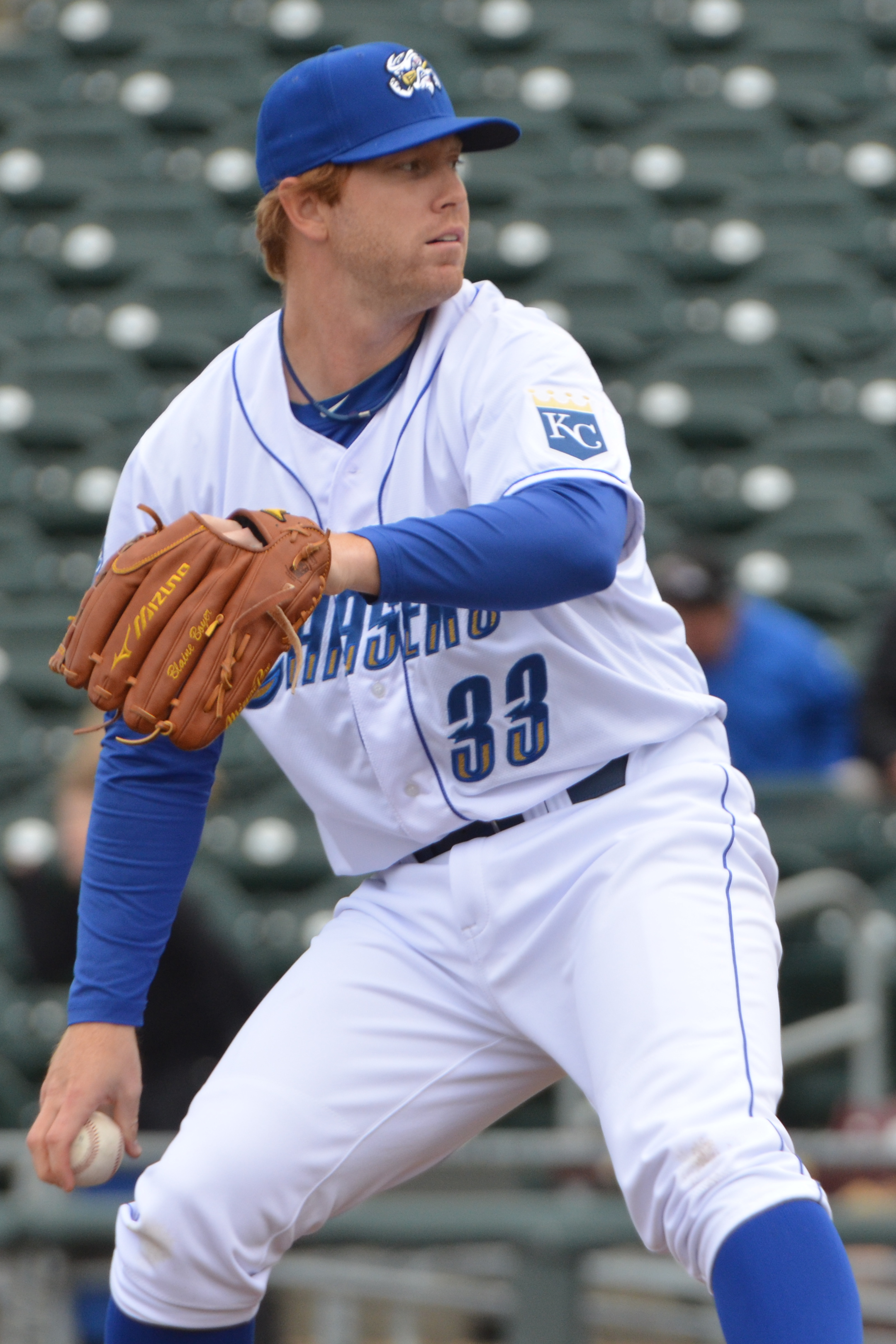
- Boyer pitching for the Omaha Storm Chasers in 2013
- Pitcher
- Born: July 11, 1981 (age 45); Atlanta, Georgia, U.S.
- Batted: Right Threw: Right

Professional debut
- MLB: June 12, 2005, for the Atlanta Braves
- NPB: June 23, 2013, for the Hanshin Tigers

Last appearance
- MLB: August 14, 2018, for the Kansas City Royals
- NPB: 2013, for the Hanshin Tigers

MLB statistics
- Win–loss record: 17–27
- Earned run average: 4.55
- Strikeouts: 292

NPB statistics
- Win–loss record: 3–1
- Earned run average: 2.67
- Strikeouts: 21
- Stats at Baseball Reference

Teams
- Atlanta Braves (2005–2009); St. Louis Cardinals (2009); Arizona Diamondbacks (2009–2010); New York Mets (2011); Hanshin Tigers (2013); San Diego Padres (2014); Minnesota Twins (2015); Milwaukee Brewers (2016); Boston Red Sox (2017); Kansas City Royals (2018)

Blaine Thomas Boyer (born July 11, 1981) is an American former professional baseball pitcher. He played in Major League Baseball (MLB) for the Atlanta Braves, St. Louis Cardinals, Arizona Diamondbacks, New York Mets, Minnesota Twins, San Diego Padres, Milwaukee Brewers, Boston Red Sox, and Kansas City Royals. He also played in Nippon Professional Baseball (NPB) for the Hanshin Tigers.

== Baseball career ==
=== Early career ===
Boyer attended George Walton Comprehensive High School in Marietta, Georgia. The Atlanta Braves selected him in the third round of the 2000 Major League Baseball draft. His first season of pro baseball was with the rookie league team the Gulf Coast Braves, where he went 1–3 with a 2.51 earned run average (ERA).

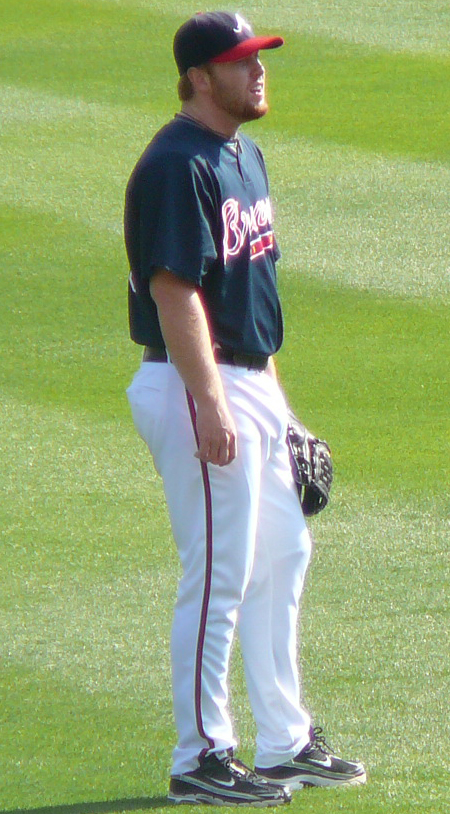
Boyer with the Atlanta Braves in 2008

Boyer went 4–5 with a 4.52 ERA and 57 strikeouts with the Danville Braves in 2001. The next year, he played with the Class A team the Macon Braves and led the bullpen with 73 strikeouts.

In 2003, Boyer stayed with the Macon Braves when they moved to Rome. That year he finished fifth in the league in wins with 12, and led the team in wins. He finished the year with a 12–8 record and a 3.69 ERA. He also recorded a minor-league career-high 115 strikeouts.

In 2004, Boyer played with Class A Myrtle Beach. He led the Carolina League with 154 innings pitched and was selected to the Carolina League All-Star team. He was elected the Carolina League Pitcher of the Week for the week of May 3 by The Sports Network.

=== Atlanta Braves ===
On June 12, 2005, Boyer was called up to the major leagues directly from the AA Mississippi Braves, and made his debut that day against the Oakland Athletics. He went 4–1 with a 2.05 ERA in 23 games at Atlanta's home field, Turner Field. In Boyer's first season, playing for the Atlanta Braves as a midseason call-up, he went 4–2 with a 3.11 ERA in 37.2 innings. The following two seasons, he spent the majority of the time in the minors, collecting just 7 appearances total.

On May 14, 2008, Boyer pitched 1.1 innings to record his first Major League save, against the Philadelphia Phillies. He played a career high 76 games, posting an ERA of 5.88 in 72 innings. He was designated for assignment the following season.

=== St.Louis Cardinals ===
On April 20, 2009, Boyer was traded to the St. Louis Cardinals for Brian Barton. On June 4, Boyer was designated for assignment. In 15 games for the Cardinals, he had a 4.41 ERA.

=== Arizona Diamondbacks ===
On June 8, 2009, Boyer was claimed by the Arizona Diamondbacks. He pitched stellar for the D'Backs for the remainder of the 2009 season, posting a 2.68 ERA in 30 games. He remained with the team the following season, appearing in 54 games.

=== New York Mets ===
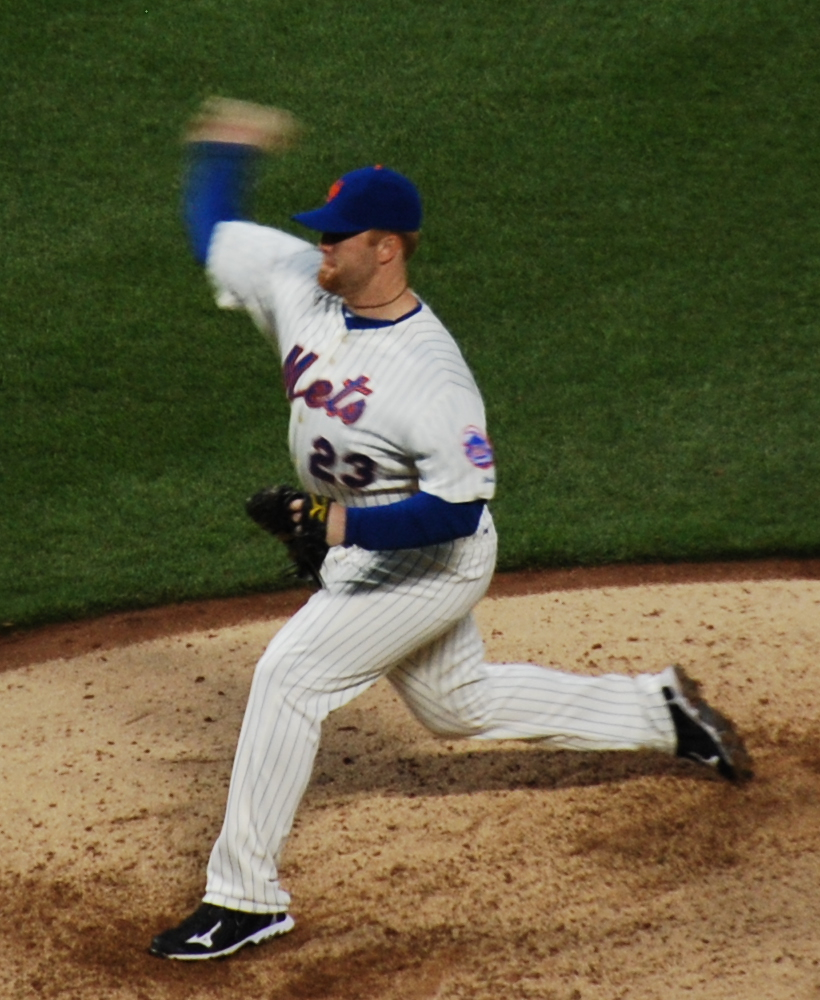
Boyer pitching for the New York Mets in 2011

Boyer signed a minor league contract with the New York Mets on January 21, 2011. The deal included an invitation to spring training. On April 10, 2011, Boyer was designated for assignment.

=== Pittsburgh Pirates ===
Boyer signed a minor league contract with the Pittsburgh Pirates on April 20, 2011. He was released on June 18.

=== St. Louis Cardinals (second stint) ===
Boyer signed a minor league contract with the St. Louis Cardinals on July 5, 2011. He was assigned to the Triple-A Memphis Redbirds. He was released on August 13, after allowing 26 runs in 16 innings for Memphis.

=== Kansas City Royals ===
Boyer retired from baseball in 2012. He returned to baseball the next year, when he signed a minor league contract with the Kansas City Royals on January 3, 2013. He was released in May.

=== Hanshin Tigers ===
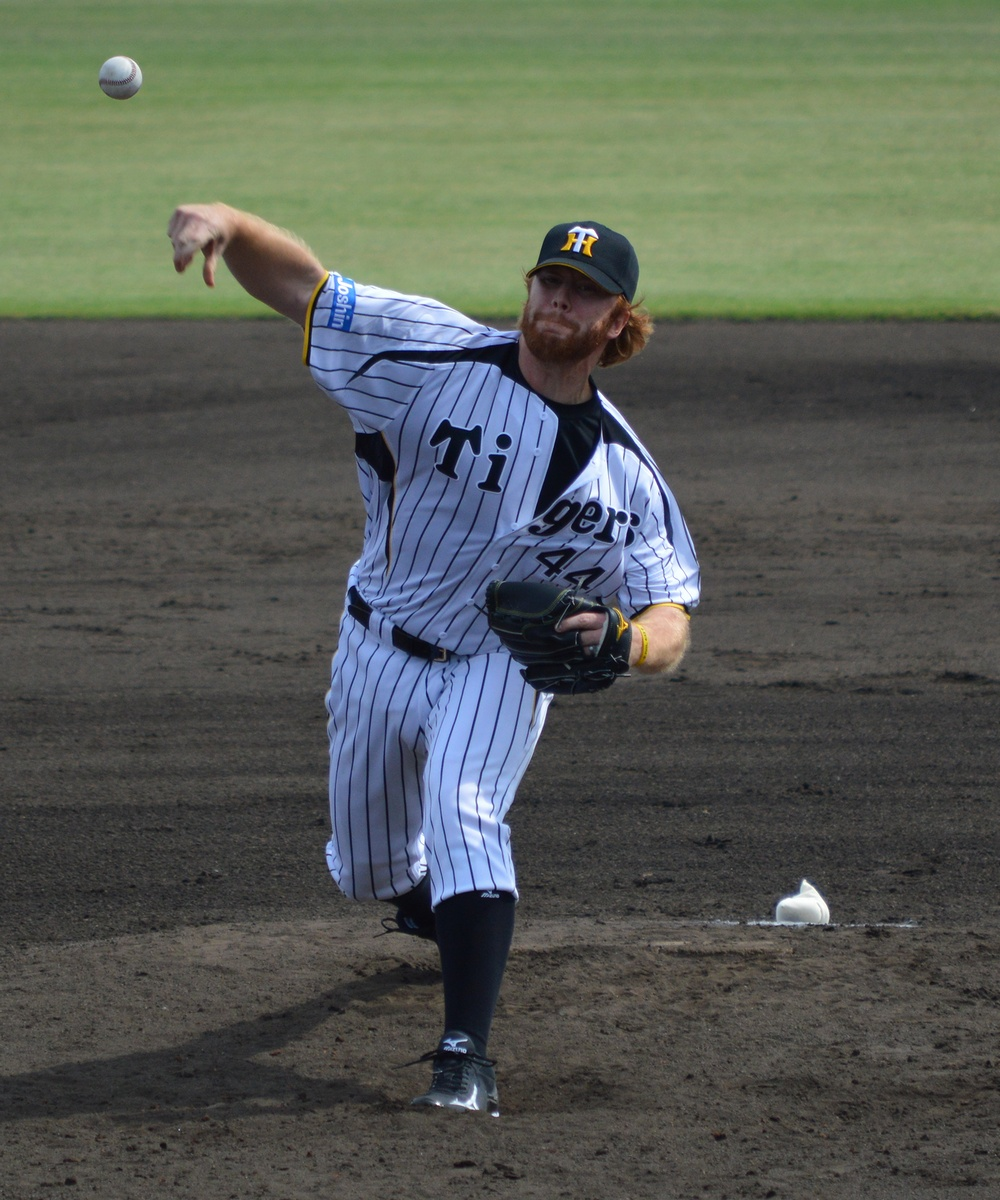
Boyer pitching for the Hanshin Tigers in 2013

On May 21, 2013, Boyer signed with the Hanshin Tigers of Nippon Professional Baseball after his release from Kansas City.

=== San Diego Padres ===
Boyer signed a minor league deal with the San Diego Padres on January 9, 2014. His contract was selected from the Triple-A El Paso Chihuahuas on May 22. He was designated for assignment on May 25, and outrighted back to El Paso on May 27. He was called back up on June 15. He became a free agent after the season. For the Padres, he ended with a 3.57 ERA in 40 1/3.

=== Minnesota Twins ===
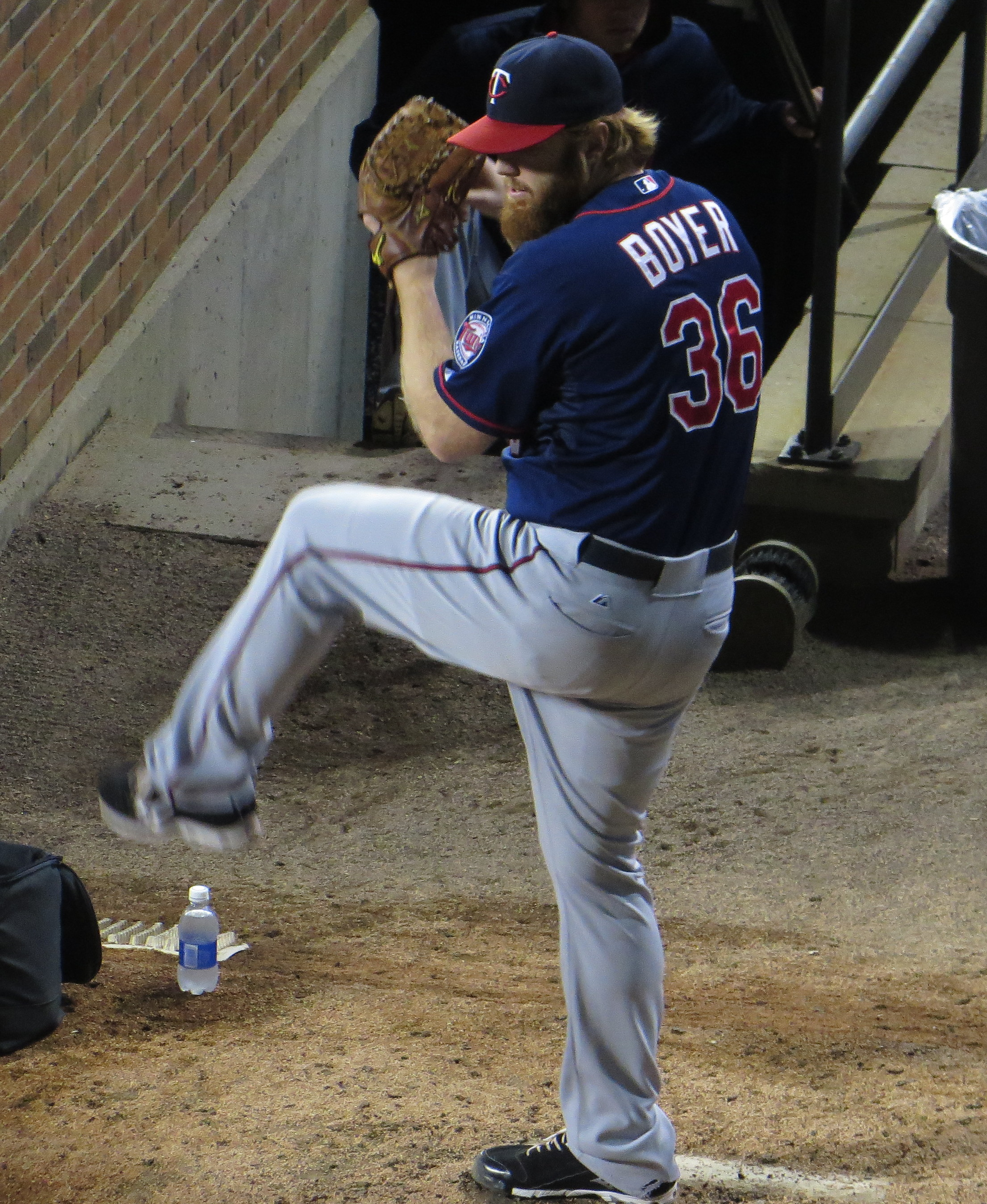
Boyer with the Minnesota Twins in 2015

On January 7, 2015, Boyer signed a minor league contract with the Minnesota Twins. The team announced that Boyer had made the Opening Day roster on March 30. For the entire season, Boyer posted a career low 2.49 ERA in 68 games for the Twins.

=== Milwaukee Brewers ===
On February 12, 2016, Boyer signed a minor league contract with the Milwaukee Brewers with an invitation to spring training, and made the Opening Day roster with a contract worth $950,000. He appeared In 61 games for the Brewers, posting an ERA of 3.95 with a 2–4 record.

=== Return to Atlanta ===
On January 17, 2017, Boyer signed a minor league contract with the Atlanta Braves. He was released on March 25.

=== Boston Red Sox ===
On April 3, 2017, Boyer signed a minor league deal with the Boston Red Sox. The Red Sox called up Boyer on May 28 2017. In 32 games for Boston, he was 1–1 in 41 1/3.

=== Return to Kansas City ===
On February 7, 2018, Boyer signed a minor league deal with the Kansas City Royals. His contract was purchased by the Royals on March 29, 2018. He appeared in 21 games, going 2–1 with a 12.05 ERA, before he was released on August 15, 2018.

== Personal life ==
Boyer is married to Ginsey, with whom he has two sons. In November 2015, working with non-profit group The Exodus Road, Boyer spent ten days undercover with former MLB first baseman (and his former Braves teammate) Adam LaRoche, helping to identify and rescue underage sex slaves in Southeast Asia.
