= Chris Resop =

American baseball player (born 1982)

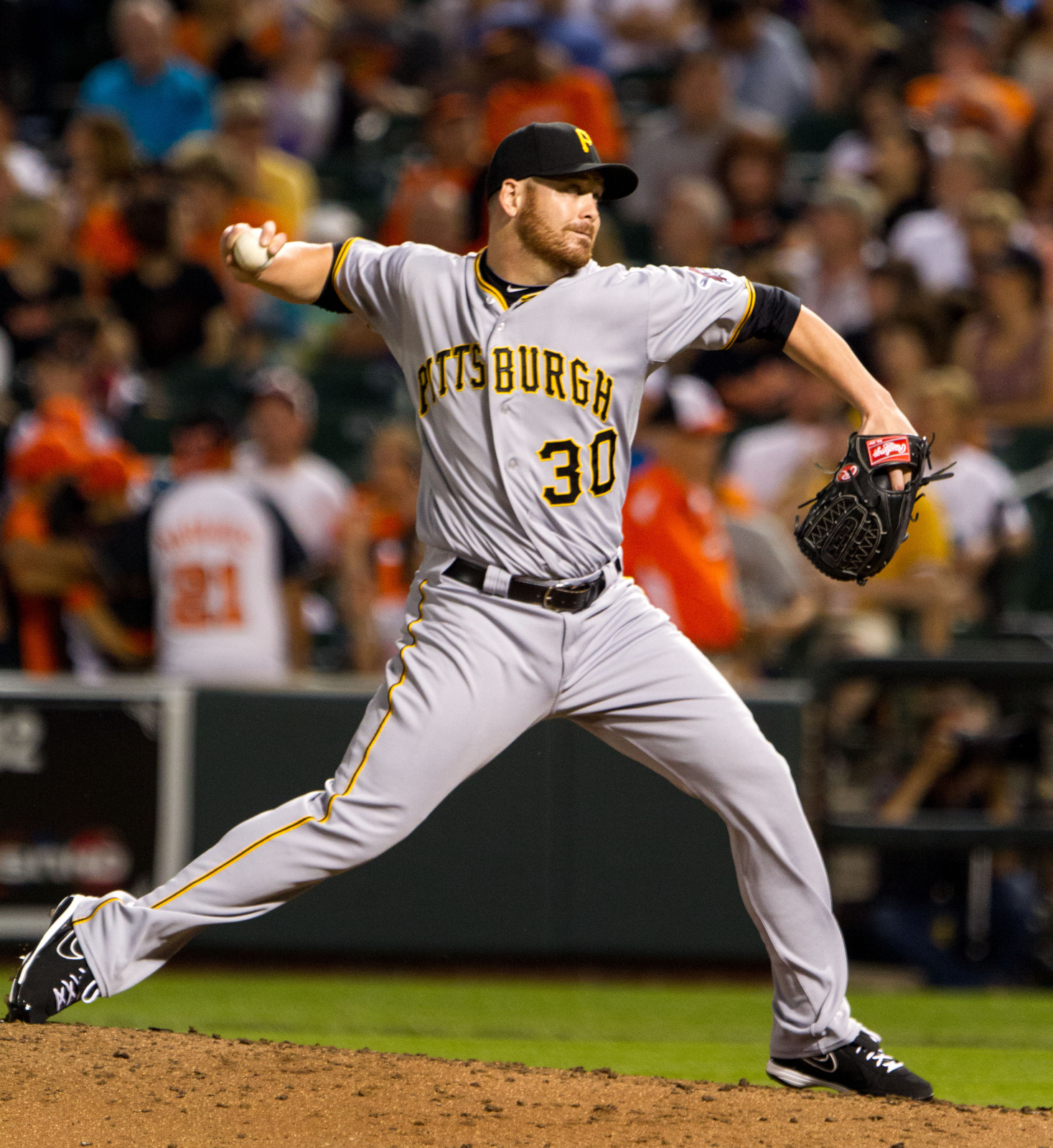
- Resop with the Pittsburgh Pirates in 2012
- Pitcher
- Born: November 4, 1982 (age 43); Naples, Florida, U.S.
- Batted: Right Threw: Right

Professional debut
- MLB: June 28, 2005, for the Florida Marlins
- NPB: 2008, for the Hanshin Tigers

Last appearance
- MLB: May 14, 2013, for the Oakland Athletics
- NPB: 2008, for the Hanshin Tigers

MLB statistics
- Win–loss record: 10–12
- Earned run average: 4.62
- Strikeouts: 204

NPB statistics
- Win–loss record: 0–2
- Earned run average: 6.75
- Strikeouts: 6
- Stats at Baseball Reference

Teams
- Florida Marlins (2005–2006); Los Angeles Angels of Anaheim (2007); Atlanta Braves (2008); Hanshin Tigers (2008); Atlanta Braves (2010); Pittsburgh Pirates (2010–2012); Oakland Athletics (2013)

Christopher Paul Resop (born November 4, 1982) is an American former professional baseball right-handed pitcher. He has since entered a career as a real estate professional.

== Early life ==
Resop graduated from Barron G. Collier High School in 2001.

== Professional career ==
=== Florida Marlins ===
Resop, was drafted by the Florida Marlins in the 4th round of the 2001 Major League Baseball draft.

In 2005, Resop made his major league debut. He continued to play for the Marlins in 2006.

=== Los Angeles Angels of Anaheim ===
He was traded to the Los Angeles Angels of Anaheim for Kevin Gregg on December 20, 2006.

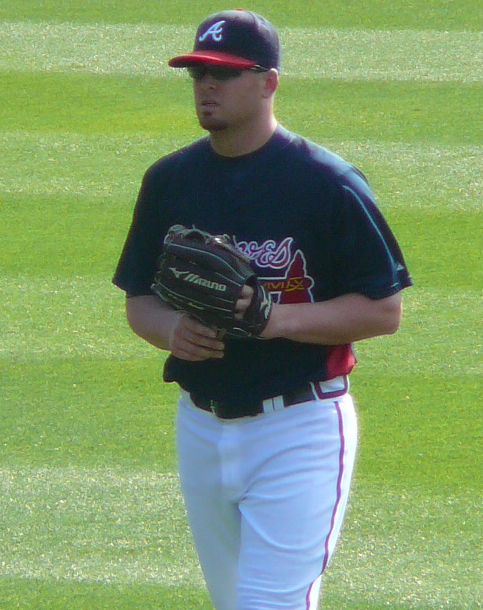
Resop with the Atlanta Braves in 2008.

=== Atlanta Braves ===
Resop was claimed off waivers by the Atlanta Braves on October 25, 2007.

In an extra-inning game against the Pittsburgh Pirates on April 3, 2008, Resop pitched a third of an inning and allowed two walks in the top of the 10th inning. Manager Bobby Cox then brought in left-handed pitcher Royce Ring to face left-handed batter Adam LaRoche and substituted Resop for Matt Diaz in left field. After Ring struck out LaRoche, Gregor Blanco came in to play left and Resop returned to the mound in place of Ring. He subsequently allowed an RBI single to Xavier Nady and earned the loss as the Pirates won 4–3.

On May 28, Resop was designated for assignment by the Braves. He was later assigned to the Richmond Braves of the International League.

=== Hanshin Tigers ===
On July 7, the Braves sold Resop's contract to the Hanshin Tigers of the Japanese Central League.

=== Return to Braves ===
Resop re-signed with the Braves prior to the 2010 season.

He was called up on June 15, 2010, after 13 starts in Triple A. In 73.1 innings, he recorded a 1.84 ERA while allowing 46 hits, 27 walks, and striking out 81 batters. He held batters to a .183 average.

=== Pittsburgh Pirates ===
On August 4, 2010, Resop was claimed off waivers by the Pittsburgh Pirates.

=== Oakland Athletics ===
On November 30, 2012, Resop was traded to the Oakland Athletics for Zach Thornton. He was designated for assignment on May 17, 2013.

=== Boston Red Sox ===
Resop signed a minor league deal with the Boston Red Sox in January 2014. On April 1, 2014, he was assigned to AAA Pawtucket Red Sox. He was released on July 1, 2014.

== Real estate career ==
After his retirement from baseball, Resop became involved in the real estate industry, initially working as an agent for William Raveis Real Estate in 2014. In 2017 he helped establish a new division of the company in Naples, Florida. This included a concierge service for professional athletes that are recently traded and new to their team's city. The division was named the Sports + Entertainment Division, and in 2019 Resop became the first official realtor of the Boston Red Sox. He then started his own company The Resop Team, which he runs with his wife Kara. Resop is the company's Managing Director. Later, he became the Managing Partner of The Agency in Naples, Florida, a boutique brokerage specializing in luxury real estate. In April 2025, Resop represented the buyer in the sale of a Port Royal estate in Naples, Florida, for $85 million, which set a new record for the highest-priced residential property ever sold in Collier County. Chris Resop is ranked #20 in the nation by sales volume according to the 2025 RealTrends Verified rankings, placing him among the elite real estate professionals in the country. He is also the top-ranked agent within The Agency and has built a reputation as one of the foremost luxury real estate advisors in the United States. (RealTrends Verified)
