= Jeff Ridgway =

American baseball player (born 1980)

- Pitcher
- Born: August 17, 1980 (age 45); Port Angeles, Washington, U.S.
- Batted: Right Threw: Left

MLB debut
- September 17, 2007, for the Tampa Bay Devil Rays

Last MLB appearance
- September 13, 2008, for the Atlanta Braves

MLB statistics
- Win–loss record: 1–0
- Earned run average: 9.90
- Strikeouts: 8
- Stats at Baseball Reference

Teams
- Tampa Bay Devil Rays (2007); Atlanta Braves (2008)

Jeffrey Allen Ridgway (born August 17, 1980) is an American former Major League Baseball player. A pitcher, Ridgway made his Major League Baseball debut with the Tampa Bay Devil Rays on September 17, 2007.

In 2007, Ridgway had an ERA of 189.00. He gave up 7 earned runs in 1/3 of an inning. As of August 2019, Ridgway's 189.00 ERA in 2007 is the highest single-season ERA of any pitcher in MLB history, tied with Joe Cleary's 1945 season and Jack Scheible's 1894 season.

On January 17, 2008, Ridgway was traded to the Atlanta Braves for Willy Aybar and Chase Fontaine. On June 11, 2008, Ridgway was called up after Tom Glavine got injured and was placed on the DL. He made his Atlanta debut the same day and pitched 2 scoreless innings.

On March 30, 2009, Ridgway was released by the Braves.

On December 16, 2009, Ridgway signed a Minor League contract with the Washington Nationals, but never played a game in their farm system.
