= Jason Perry (baseball) =

American baseball player (born 1980)

- Outfielder
- Born: August 18, 1980 (age 46); Fremont, Nebraska, U.S.
- Batted: Left Threw: Right

MLB debut
- July 4, 2008, for the Atlanta Braves

Last MLB appearance
- July 7, 2008, for the Atlanta Braves

MLB statistics
- Batting average: .118
- Home runs: 0
- Runs batted in: 1
- Stats at Baseball Reference

Teams
- Atlanta Braves (2008)

Jason Kyle Perry (born August 18, 1980) is an American former Major League Baseball outfielder who played for the Atlanta Braves in 2008.

== Amateur career ==
A native of Fremont, Nebraska, Perry attended Georgia Tech, and in 2001 he played collegiate summer baseball with the Hyannis Mets of the Cape Cod Baseball League, where he was named a league all-star. He was selected by the Toronto Blue Jays in the 6th round of the 2002 MLB draft.

== Professional career ==
=== Toronto Blue Jays ===
Perry played for the Blue Jays organization until June 23, 2003, when he was traded to the Oakland Athletics for John-Ford Griffin.

=== Oakland Athletics ===
For the next five years, Perry would play in the Athletics minor leagues. His best season was in 2004 for the Single-A Modesto A's where he had a .338 batting average, 24 home runs, and 80 RBI in 83 games. In 2005, he was named to the Texas League's All-star team as the DH. On June 14, 2007, Perry was traded to the Detroit Tigers for Jack Hannahan.

=== Detroit Tigers ===
In 16 games for the Tigers' Triple-A affiliate, the Toledo Mud Hens, Perry struggled with a .184 batting average, but did hit two home runs. The Tigers released him during 2008 spring training.

=== Atlanta Braves ===
Signed by his hometown Braves (Perry was born in Nebraska, but grew up in nearby Jonesboro, Georgia), Perry was promoted to the major league club from Triple-A Richmond on July 4, 2008, to replace struggling outfielder Jeff Francoeur, who was optioned to Double-A Mississippi. Before his promotion, Perry had hit .309 with 18 homers between Mississippi and Richmond in 2008. The move reunited him with former Georgia Tech teammate Mark Teixeira. Perry made his major league debut that night against the Houston Astros, starting in Francoeur's usual right field spot. In his first MLB at bat, Perry hit an RBI triple off Astros starter Brian Moehler. The hit made him the first player in Atlanta history to triple in his first at-bat.

=== Tampa Bay Rays ===
On May 6, 2009, Perry was signed by the Tampa Bay Rays to a minor league contract and was assigned to Double-A Montgomery.
