= Jorge Campillo =

Mexican baseball player (born 1978)

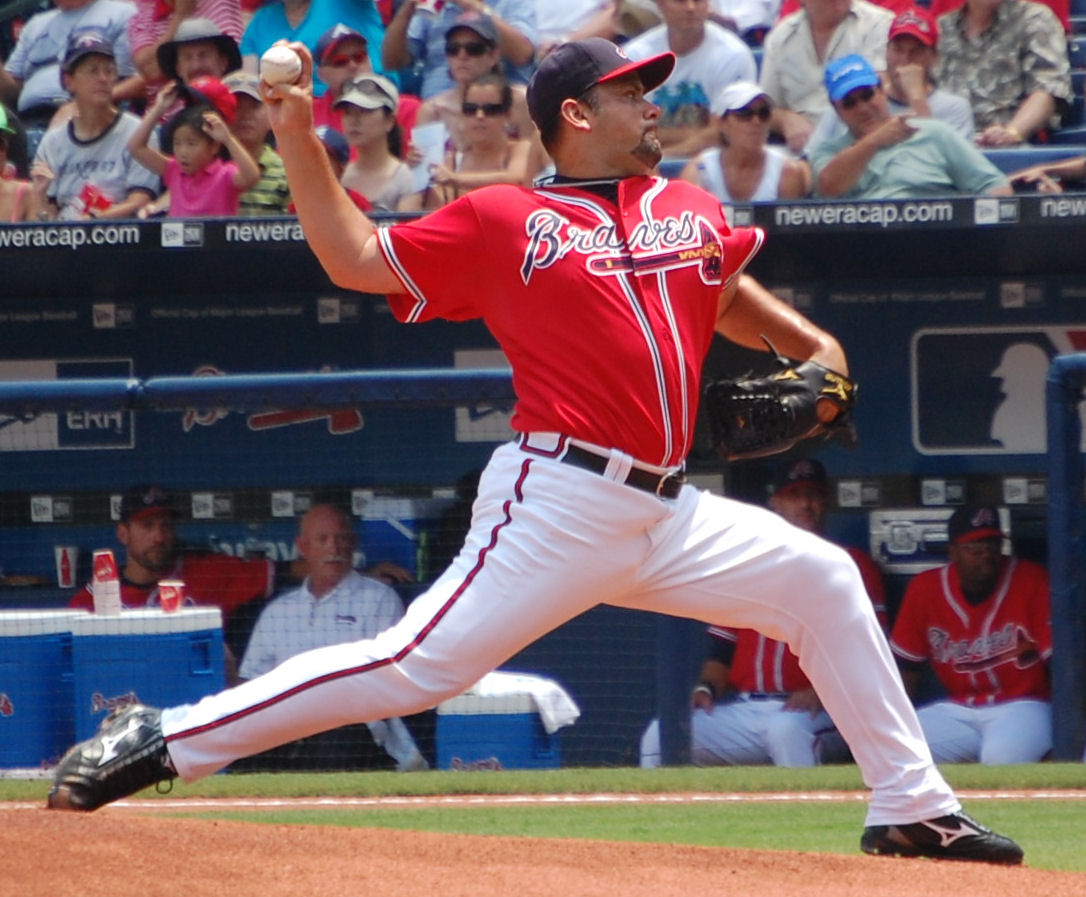
- Campillo pitching for the Atlanta Braves in 2008
- Pitcher
- Born: August 10, 1978 (age 48); Tijuana, Mexico
- Batted: Right Threw: Right

MLB debut
- May 20, 2005, for the Seattle Mariners

Last MLB appearance
- May 28, 2009, for the Atlanta Braves

MLB statistics
- Win–loss record: 9–7
- Earned run average: 4.23
- Strikeouts: 121
- Stats at Baseball Reference

Teams
- Seattle Mariners (2005–2007); Atlanta Braves (2008–2009)
Medals
Men's baseball
Representing Mexico
Pan American Games
Bronze medal – third place	2007 Rio de Janeiro	Team

Jorge "Popeye" Campillo Hidalgo (born August 10, 1978) is a Mexican former right-handed pitcher.

== Career ==
=== Atlanta Braves ===
Campillo was signed as an undrafted free agent by the Atlanta Braves on February 14, 1996.

=== Seattle Mariners ===
Campillo was released by the Braves after the 1996 season and signed with a team in the Mexican Pacific League. The Mariners acquired his rights and signed him on March 26, 2005.

He made his major league debut in 2005 with the Seattle Mariners, playing in two games during the season. After leaving a game in 2005 with an injury, Campillo required Tommy John surgery and subsequently missed most of the 2006 season. After rehabbing, Campillo made a rocky first post-surgery appearance with the Mariners in late 2006, after the team purchased his contract from Triple-A Tacoma. He became a free agent after the 2006 season, but was re-signed to a minor league contract by the Mariners.

Campillo played Winter Ball prior to the 2007 season, when he very successfully headlined the Triple-A Tacoma Rainiers' starting rotation. His recovery complete, Campillo led the Pacific Coast League in ERA. After the end of the minor league season, he was recalled to Seattle, where Campillo made several successful appearances out of the Mariner bullpen.

=== Second stint with Braves ===
Campillo became a free agent after the season. On December 17, 2007, Campillo signed with the Atlanta Braves to a minor league contract with an invitation to spring training.

Campillo did not make the 2008 opening day roster but soon received a callup on April 10. He made his Braves debut on April 13 in a relief appearance against the Washington Nationals. Campillo made his first start as an Atlanta Brave on May 20, 2008. He pitched 6 innings and was credited with a win.

On October 12, 2009, the Atlanta Braves outrighted him to the Gwinnett Braves and he elected free agency.

=== Kansas City Royals ===
On November 19, 2009, Campillo signed a minor-league contract with the Kansas City Royals. He was released on June 27, 2010.

=== Tigres de Quintana Roo ===
On March 17, 2011, Campillo signed with the Tigres de Quintana Roo of the Mexican League in 20 games (17 starts) he threw 80.2 innings going 3-7 with a 5.58 ERA with 47 strikeouts and 1 save. He became a free agent following the 2012 season in which he made 21 starts throwing 108.1 innings going 10-6 with a 4.07 ERA and 63 strikeouts.
