= Mike Gonzalez (pitcher) =

American baseball player (born 1978)

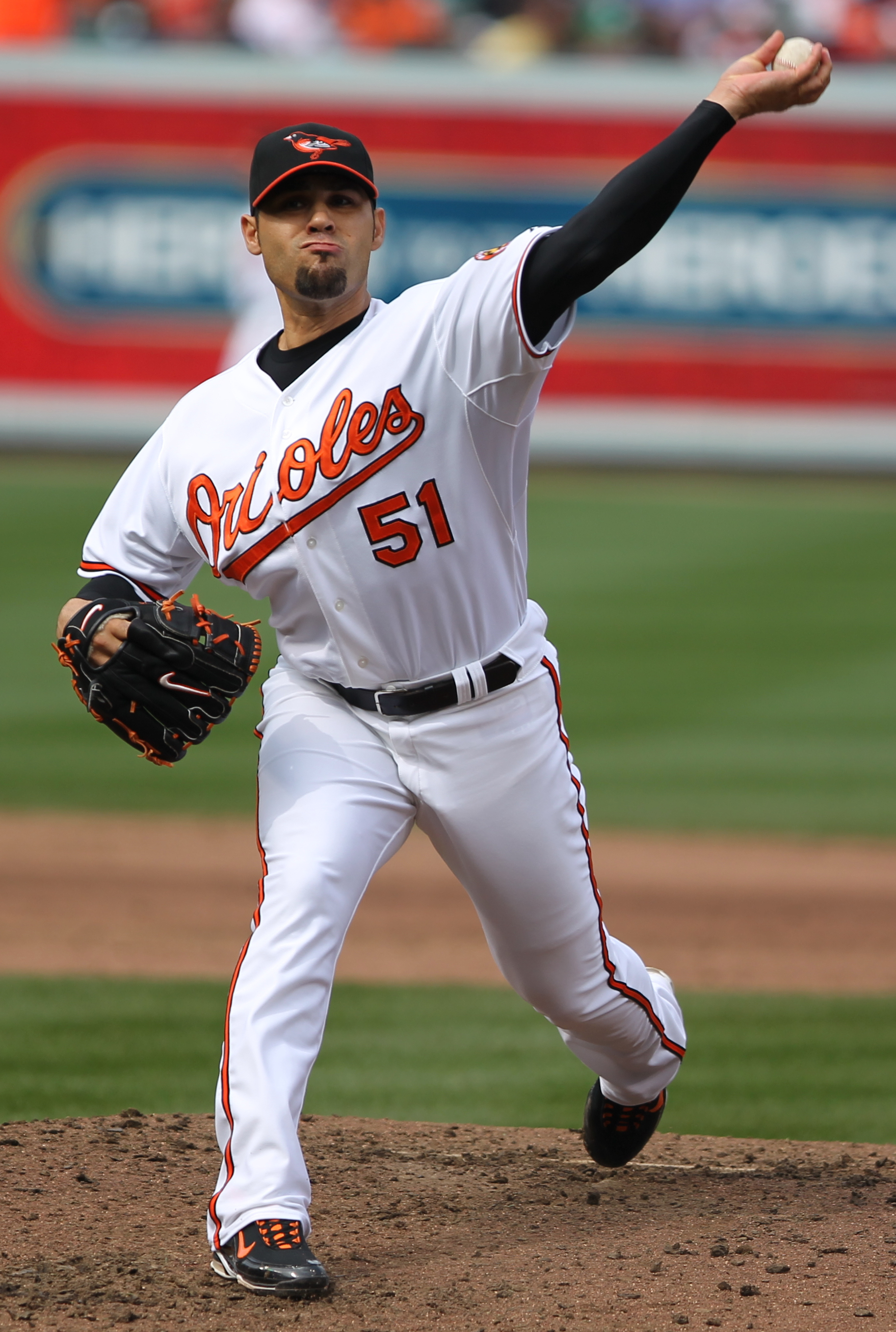
- Gonzalez with the Baltimore Orioles
- Pitcher
- Born: May 23, 1978 (age 48); Corpus Christi, Texas, U.S.
- Batted: Right Threw: Left

MLB debut
- August 11, 2003, for the Pittsburgh Pirates

Last MLB appearance
- September 28, 2013, for the Milwaukee Brewers

MLB statistics
- Win–loss record: 17–24
- Earned run average: 3.14
- Strikeouts: 511
- Stats at Baseball Reference

Teams
- Pittsburgh Pirates (2003–2006); Atlanta Braves (2007–2009); Baltimore Orioles (2010–2011); Texas Rangers (2011); Washington Nationals (2012); Milwaukee Brewers (2013)

Michael Vela Gonzalez (born May 23, 1978) is an American former professional baseball pitcher. He played in Major League Baseball (MLB) for the Pittsburgh Pirates, Atlanta Braves, Baltimore Orioles, Texas Rangers, Washington Nationals, and Milwaukee Brewers.

== Professional career ==
=== Pittsburgh Pirates ===
Gonzalez was traded twice prior to his MLB debut. First, on July 22, 2003, where he was traded by the Pittsburgh Pirates with Scott Sauerbeck to the Boston Red Sox for Brandon Lyon and Anastacio Martinez. Second, on July 31, he was traded back to Pittsburgh with Freddy Sanchez and cash for Brandon Lyon, Anastacio Martinez and Jeff Suppan. Gonzalez made 16 appearances for the Pirates during his rookie campaign, struggling to an 0–1 record and 7.56 ERA with six strikeouts across 8 1/3 innings pitched.

Gonzalez made 47 appearances out of the bullpen for Pittsburgh during the 2004 season, registering a 3–1 record and 1.25 ERA with 55 strikeouts over 43 1/3 innings of work.

Gonzalez converted all 24 save attempts during the 2006 season, in which he also tallied a 3–4 record and 2.17 ERA with 64 strikeouts. His season ended early because of an elbow injury.

=== Atlanta Braves ===
Gonzalez was traded to the Atlanta Braves with Brent Lillibridge in exchange for Adam LaRoche and Jamie Romak on January 17, 2007.

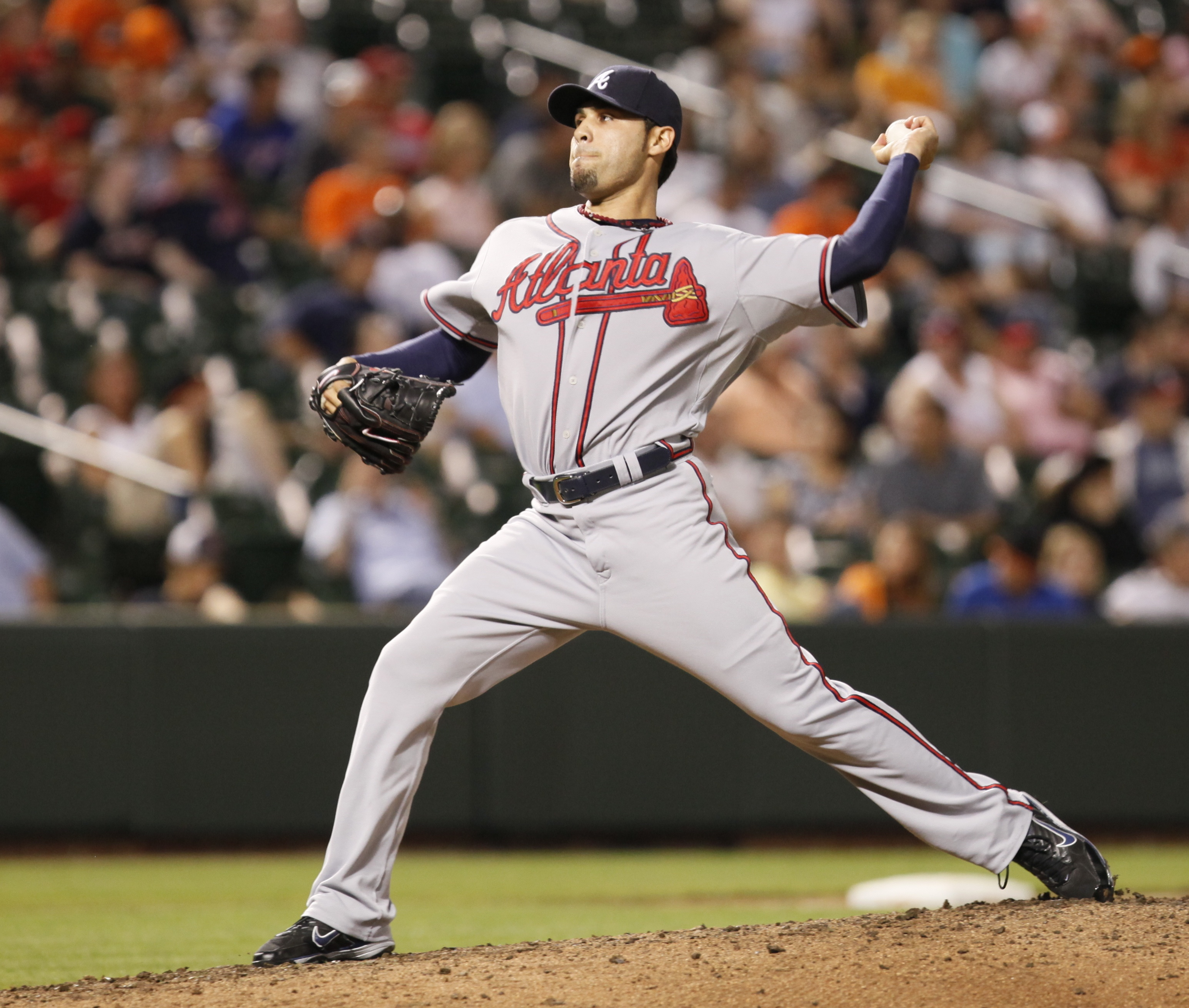
Gonzalez pitching for the Atlanta Braves in 2009.

After experiencing a drop in velocity on his fastball in excess of 10 mph (16 km/h) in a game versus the Washington Nationals, the Braves quickly took precautionary measures and placed him on the disabled list on May 16, with a left elbow strain. After several MRIs showed no damage to his elbow, a more specialized MRI was performed that indeed revealed a slight ligament tear. On May 25, it was announced that his elbow would require Tommy John surgery and, consequently, he would miss at least the rest of the 2007 season, and the first half of the 2008 season. In 17 innings with the Braves prior to the injury, Gonzalez posted a 1.59 ERA with a 2–0 record and two saves.

Gonzalez made his return on June 18, 2008, pitching a perfect 9th inning and recording a save against the Texas Rangers. In 36 outings for the Rangers, he accumulated an 0–3 record and 4.28 ERA with 44 strikeouts and 14 saves over 33 2/3 innings of work.

On January 19, 2009, Gonzalez avoided arbitration and signed a one-year $3.45 million contract. He made 80 appearances for the Braves during the regular season, in which he compiled a 5–4 record and 2.42 ERA with 90 strikeouts and 10 saves across 74 1/3 innings pitched.

=== Baltimore Orioles ===
On December 19, 2009, Gonzalez signed a two-year, $12 million contract with the Baltimore Orioles. Gonzalez underperformed early in 2010, blowing two saves in his first opportunities and hearing boos from the crowd after he blew a save chance in the home opener. On April 14, 2010, Gonzalez was placed on the 15-day disabled list with a strained left shoulder. He finished the year with a 4.01 ERA in 24 2/3 innings over 29 appearances.

=== Texas Rangers ===
On August 31, 2011, Gonzalez was traded to the Texas Rangers in exchange for Pedro Strop. He made seven appearances for the Rangers, registering a 2–2 record and 4.39 ERA with one save and five strikeouts. Gonzalez made his postseason debut with the Rangers in 2011; the team later lost the 2011 World Series to the St. Louis Cardinals.

=== Washington Nationals ===
On May 10, 2012, the Washington Nationals agreed to terms with Gonzalez on a one-year, minor league contract. On June 3, the Nationals selected Gonzalez's contract, adding him to their active roster. He made 47 appearances over the remainder of the season, recording a 3.03 ERA with 39 strikeouts across 35 2/3 innings pitched.

=== Milwaukee Brewers ===
On December 29, 2012, Gonzalez signed with the Milwaukee Brewers on a one-year $2.21 million contract, pending a physical. Gonzalez made 75 relief appearances for the Brewers during the 2013 season, in which he posted an 0–3 record and 4.68 ERA with 60 strikeouts over 50 innings of work.

=== Washington Nationals (second stint) ===
On March 4, 2014, Gonzalez re-signed with the Washington Nationals on a minor league contract. In 21 appearances for the Triple-A Syracuse Chiefs, he posted a 1–1 record and 2.78 ERA with 18 strikeouts and six saves across 22 2/3 innings pitched. Gonzalez was released by the Nationals organization on July 5.

=== Toros de Tijuana ===
On April 8, 2016, Gonzalez signed with the Toros de Tijuana of the Mexican League. In 28 appearances for Tijuana, he logged an 0–2 record and 5.89 ERA with 15 strikeouts across 18 1/3 innings pitched. Gonzalez became a free agent following the season.
