= James Parr (baseball) =

American baseball player (born 1986)

- Pitcher
- Born: February 27, 1986 (age 39); Albuquerque, New Mexico, U.S.
- Batted: Right Threw: Right

MLB debut
- September 4, 2008, for the Atlanta Braves

Last appearance
- May 21, 2009, for the Atlanta Braves

MLB statistics
- Win–loss record: 1-0
- Earned run average: 5.20
- Strikeouts: 26
- Stats at Baseball Reference

Teams
- Atlanta Braves (2008–2009)

James R. Parr (born February 27, 1986) is an American former professional baseball pitcher. He pitched in Major League Baseball for the Atlanta Braves from 2008 to 2009.

== Career ==
=== Atlanta Braves ===
He was drafted in the fourth round, 131st overall pick, out of La Cueva High School in Albuquerque, New Mexico by the Atlanta Braves in the 2004 MLB draft.

On September 4, 2008, Parr made his major league debut for the Braves. Parr pitched 6 innings, allowed no runs on 2 hits, and earned his first major league victory in the Braves 2-0 win against the Washington Nationals.

Atlanta manager Bobby Cox said of his debut, "What a night he had. He's sneaky quick. He doesn't light up the radar gun, but he's got a little looping curve and a changeup. I was impressed. It's a great way to break in."

Having been granted free agency in November 2010.

=== Gary SouthShore RailCats ===
On May 16, 2014, After 4 years of inactivity, Parr signed with the Gary SouthShore RailCats of the American Association of Independent Professional Baseball. In 21 games 24 innings of relief he went 2-2 with a 4.13 ERA with 25 strikeouts and 8 saves.

=== Bridgeport Bluefish ===
On September 5, 2014, Parr was traded to the Bridgeport Bluefish of the Atlantic League of Professional Baseball. In 5 games 9.2 innings of relief he went 1-0 with a 2.79 ERA with 11 strikeouts.

=== Sugar Land Skeeters ===
On March 16, 2015, Parr signed with the Sugar Land Skeeters of the Atlantic League of Professional Baseball. He became a free agent following the season. In 42 games 47 innings of relief he went 2-3 with a 4.40 ERA with 50 strikeouts and 1 save.

In 2016, Parr founded Pro4mer, a business that sought to introduce young athletes to professionals.
