= Jeff Bennett (baseball) =

American baseball player (born 1980)

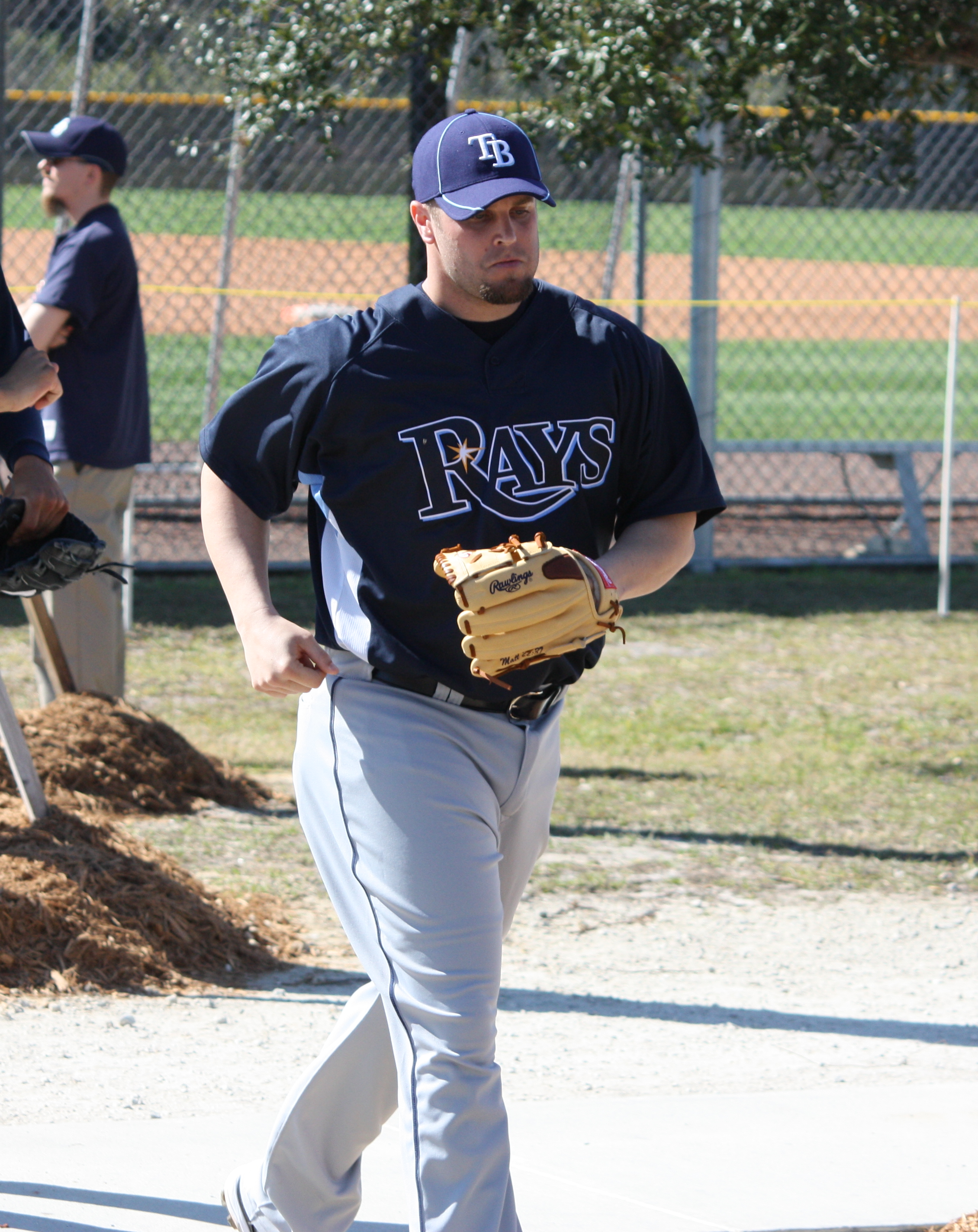
- Bennett with the Tampa Bay Rays
- Pitcher
- Born: June 10, 1980 (age 45); Donelson, Tennessee, U.S.
- Batted: Right Threw: Right

MLB debut
- April 6, 2004, for the Milwaukee Brewers

Last MLB appearance
- October 4, 2009, for the Tampa Bay Rays

MLB statistics
- Win–loss record: 8–17
- Earned run average: 4.30
- Strikeouts: 154
- Stats at Baseball Reference

Teams
- Milwaukee Brewers (2004); Atlanta Braves (2007–2009); Tampa Bay Rays (2009)

David Jeffrey Bennett (born June 10, 1980) is an American former professional baseball pitcher. He played in Major League Baseball (MLB) for four seasons with the Milwaukee Brewers, Atlanta Braves, and Tampa Bay Rays.

== Early life ==
Jeff Bennett grew up in Brush Creek, Tennessee, and was an all-state pitcher for Gordonsville High School. He holds the school's career home run record.

== Baseball career ==
=== Pittsburgh Pirates ===
Bennett was drafted by the Pittsburgh Pirates in the 19th round of the 1998 Major League Baseball draft. He played his first professional season with the Rookie Gulf Coast League Pirates in 1998. In 13 games, he compiled a 2–4 win–loss record with a 4.63 earned run average (ERA). He advanced through the Pirates' minor league system, playing as high as Triple-A with the Nashville Sounds of the Pacific Coast League in 2003.

=== Milwaukee Brewers ===
In December 2003, the Milwaukee Brewers acquired Bennett in the Rule 5 draft from Pittsburgh. He made his major league debut on April 6, 2004, against the St. Louis Cardinals at Busch Memorial Stadium and he gave up 2 hits in 1 1/3 innings. With the Brewers, Bennett went 1–5 with a 4.79 ERA in 60 appearances. He was well known for keeping the brim of his baseball cap almost completely flat and wearing it so low that the bill was slightly above his eyes.

He was granted free agency following the season. Bennett missed the entire 2006 season after undergoing a successful Tommy John surgery.

=== Atlanta Braves ===
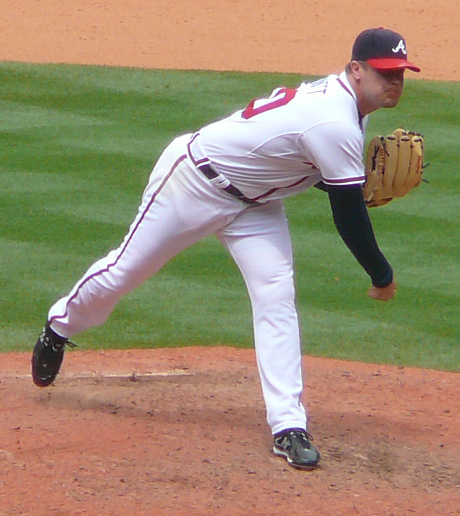
Bennett with Atlanta in 2008

On September 20, 2007, Bennett made his first career start and his first appearance with the Atlanta Braves. Against the Milwaukee Brewers, Bennett went 5 2/3 innings while striking out 8, earning the win. On September 25, Bennett earned a win in relief against the Philadelphia Phillies. He finished the season 2–1 with a 3.46 ERA.

In a relief appearance against the Arizona Diamondbacks on May 24, 2008, Bennett recorded his first major league hit in the fifth inning against pitcher Randy Johnson.

The Braves suspended Bennett's pay on June 25, 2009, the day after he fractured his hand with an angry punch to a clubhouse wall. Bennett filed a grievance with the Major League Baseball Players Association (MLBPA) and continued his rehab assignment at Triple-A Gwinnett. The MLBPA directed the Braves to either repay the suspended funds or grant him free agency. He requested the Braves release him from his contract, and was granted his release on July 30.

=== Tampa Bay Rays ===
Bennett signed with the Tampa Bay Rays on August 1, 2009. In eleven games, all relief appearances, Bennett had a 9.95 ERA. He appeared in three games for the Durham Bulls, the Rays' Triple-A affiliate, before being released on May 13, 2010.

=== Return to the Milwaukee Brewers ===
On May 25, 2010, Bennett signed a minor league contract with the Milwaukee Brewers, and was assigned to Triple-A Nashville. He came on in relief in twelve games, and was released after the season.

=== Arizona Diamondbacks ===
On April 30, 2011, in his first outing after returning from a torn labrum, he struck out two batters in a scoreless inning for the Lancaster Barnstormers of the independent Atlantic League of Professional Baseball. He was signed by the Arizona Diamondbacks and assigned to the Triple-A Reno Aces on June 15. Bennett was released on August 30.

=== Independent leagues ===
From late 2011 through 2013, Bennett played for a number of teams in the Mexican Pacific League, Venezuelan Professional Baseball League, Atlantic League, and Mexican League.

=== Los Angeles Dodgers ===
Bennett signed a minor league deal with the Los Angeles Dodgers on May 16, 2014. He made 21 starts for the Triple-A Albuquerque Isotopes, compiling an 8–6 record with a 3.82 ERA. He made one start in winter ball after the season, managing only one out. After the out, he lost feeling in his pitching hand and took himself out of the game. He decided to retire from baseball the following March.

== Personal life ==
In early 2015, Bennett began giving baseball lessons to local youth athletes in Middle Tennessee near his home in Mt. Juliet. Initially borrowing places to train, his business soon grew large enough to necessitate owning his own facility: Jeff Bennett's Baseball Academy, near Lebanon, Tennessee.

He and his wife have four children.
