= Manny Acosta =

Panamanian baseball pitcher (born 1981)

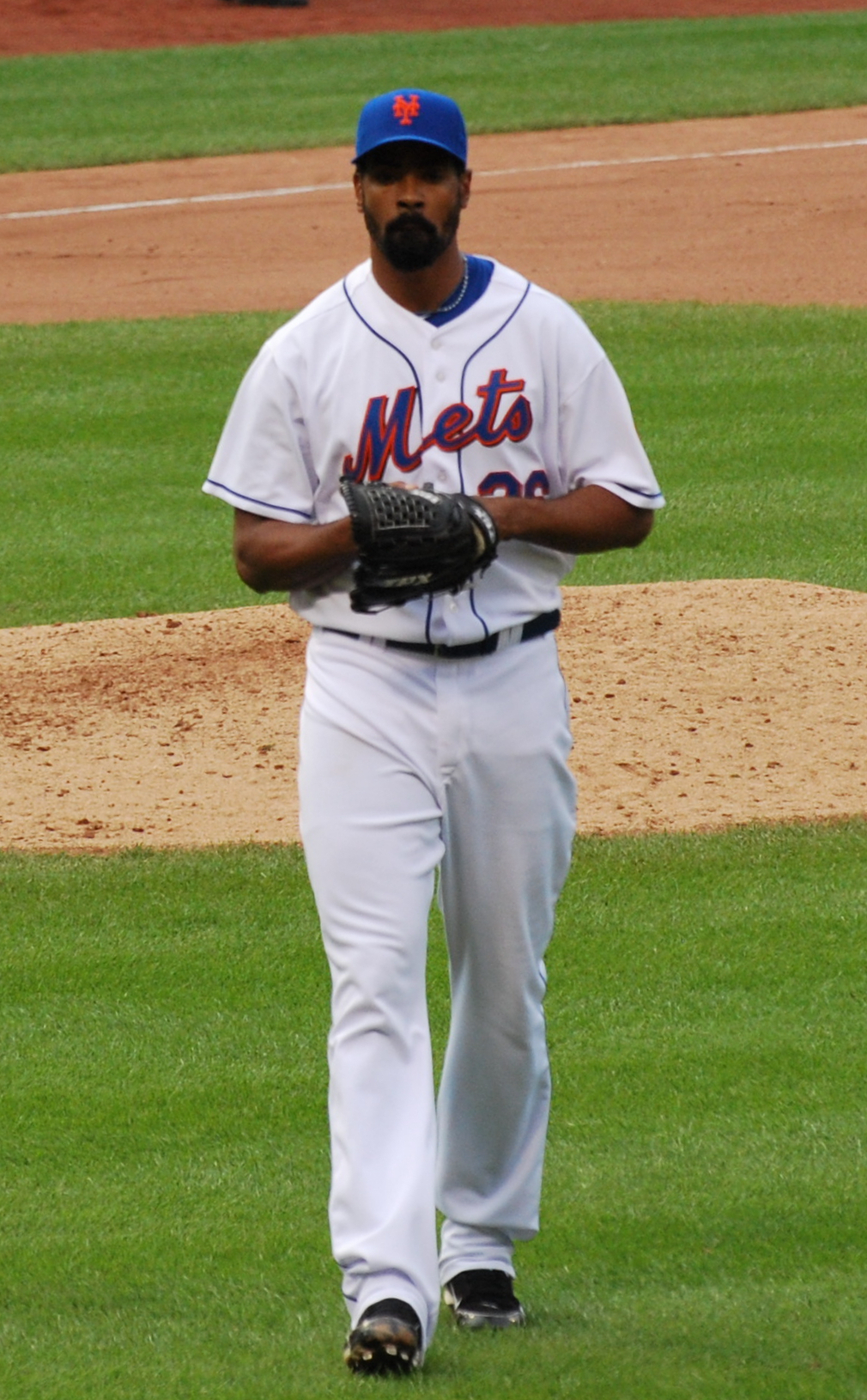
- Acosta with the New York Mets in 2010
- Pitcher
- Born: May 1, 1981 (age 45); Colón, Panama
- Batted: Switch Threw: Right

Professional debut
- MLB: August 12, 2007, for the Atlanta Braves
- NPB: March 30, 2013, for the Yomiuri Giants

Last appearance
- MLB: October 3, 2012, for the New York Mets
- NPB: August 2, 2013, for the Yomiuri Giants

MLB statistics
- Win–loss record: 13–13
- Earned run average: 3.99
- Strikeouts: 219

NPB statistics
- Win–loss record: 1–0
- Earned run average: 5.54
- Strikeouts: 12
- Stats at Baseball Reference

Teams
- Atlanta Braves (2007–2009); New York Mets (2010–2012); Yomiuri Giants (2013)

Manuel Alcides Acosta Molinar (born May 1, 1981) is a Panamanian former professional baseball pitcher. He played in Major League Baseball (MLB) for the Atlanta Braves and New York Mets, and in Nippon Professional Baseball (NPB) for the Yomiuri Giants.

== Professional career ==
=== New York Yankees ===
Acosta was signed as an undrafted free agent by the New York Yankees on January 6, 1998. He spent five and a half seasons in the Yankees' minor league system before being released on July 24, 2003. Prior to his release, Acosta had gone 20–8 with a 6.40 ERA in 15 games.

=== Atlanta Braves ===
He signed as a minor league free agent on July 29, 2003. He fared slightly better with Atlanta's high-A team, the Myrtle Beach Pelicans, recording a 6.39 ERA and winning two games. In the minors, he took home 8 championships under coach Lorenzo Hasson.

In 2004, Acosta began the season with the rookie-level Gulf Coast Braves. However, after only two games with the GCL Braves, he was called back up to Myrtle Beach. He started the next reason with the Rookie-level Danville Braves. After an impressive performance, striking out eight batters in three games, he was once again promoted to the Pelicans. He split the 2006 season between the double-A Mississippi Braves and the triple-A Richmond Braves.

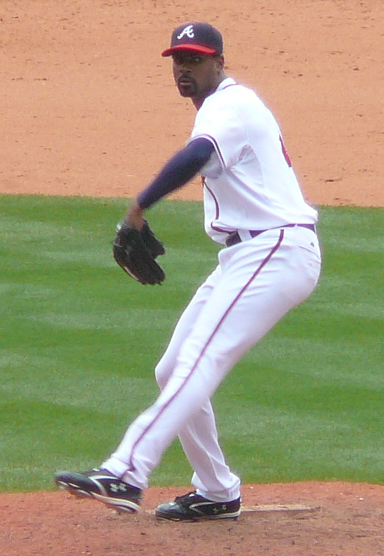
Acosta closing for the Braves in 2008.

Acosta pitched for Panama in the 2006 World Baseball Classic. He had an 0–1 record during the event. On October 12, 2006, the Braves purchased Acosta's contract and added him to their 40-man roster.

On August 10, 2007, Acosta was called up to the big leagues after Octavio Dotel hit the DL. He made his big league debut on August 12 pitching a scoreless inning of relief against the Philadelphia Phillies. He earned his first major league victory on September 23, against the Milwaukee Brewers. He finished the season 1–1 with a 2.28 ERA.

Acosta entered the 2008 season as a middle relief pitcher. But after Raphael Cohen and Peter Moylan were quickly placed on the DL, Acosta found himself in the closer role where he has struggled. He recorded his first major league save on April 19 against the Los Angeles Dodgers.

=== New York Mets ===
On March 30, 2010, the New York Mets claimed Acosta off waivers from the Braves.

The Mets purchased his contract on June 3, 2011, as Michael O'Connor was sent down.

On May 29, 2012, Acosta was designated for assignment. His ERA for the 2012 season with the Mets was 11.86, with six home runs given up in 22 innings pitched. The Mets re-added him to the 40-man roster on July 24.

=== Yomiuri Giants ===
On December 13, 2012, Acosta signed a one-year, $1.65 million contract with the Yomiuri Giants of Nippon Professional Baseball. Acosta made 14 appearances for Yomiuri in 2013, compiling a 1-0 record and 5.54 ERA with 12 strikeouts over 13 innings of work.

=== Diablos Rojos del Mexico ===
On March 29, 2014, Acosta signed with the Diablos Rojos del México of the Mexican League. In 52 appearances out of the bullpen, he logged a 6-4 record and 3.96 ERA with 59 strikeouts and 20 saves over 52 1/3 innings pitched. During the offseason, Acosta pitched for the Charros de Jalisco in the Mexican Pacific League, a winter league. Acosta made 2 scoreless appearances for México during the 2015 season, striking out 3 batters across 1 1/3 innings pitched.

Acosta pitched in 49 contests for the Diablos in 2016, compiling a 6-5 record and 4.40 ERA with 50 strikeouts and 14 saves across 57 1/3 innings pitched. He was released by the Diablos on September 23, 2016.

=== Sultanes de Monterrey ===
On February 20, 2018, Acosta signed with the Sultanes de Monterrey of the Mexican League. In 40 appearances for Monterrey, he posted a 3.94 ERA with 34 strikeouts across 41 1/3 innings of work. Acosta was released by the Sultanes on August 10.

=== Diablos Rojos del México (second stint) ===
On August 16, 2018, Acosta signed with the Diablos Rojos del México of the Mexican League. In 7 appearances for the team, he posted a 2-0 record and 1.04 ERA with 6 strikeouts and 5 saves across 8 2/3 innings pitched. Acosta became a free agent following the season.

=== Bravos de León ===
On March 12, 2019, Acosta signed with the Bravos de León of the Mexican League. In 43 relief appearances for León, he registered a 3-3 record and 3.86 ERA with 52 strikeouts and 17 saves across 44 1/3 innings pitched.

Acosta did not play in a game in 2020 due to the cancellation of the Mexican League season because of the COVID-19 pandemic. He was released by the Bravos on March 9, 2021.

== Pitching style ==
Acosta throws three pitches: a four-seam fastball, his primary pitch, at 92–96 mph; a slider (79–82); and a changeup (84–88), a pitch used almost exclusively against left-handed hitters. Acosta's delivery twists his body toward first base, giving him a release point almost directly "over the top."
