= Pac-12 Conference baseball awards =

At the end of each regular season, the Pac-12 Conference names major award winners in baseball. Currently, it names a Coach, Pitcher, Player, and Newcomer of the Year. The Coach and Player awards date to 1978. From 1978 to 1998, separate awards in both three categories were given in the North and South Divisions. The Pitcher and Newcomer awards were added later.

Through the end of the 2014 season, Arizona State has won 31 major awards, the most of any program. Three other schools have won at least twenty: Oregon State (25), Stanford (22), and USC (20).

== Coach of the Year ==
The Coach of the Year award is given annually to the Pac-12's best head coach, as chosen by a vote of the conference's coaches. It was first presented in 1978. From 1978 and 1998, a Coach of the Year was named in both the North and South Divisions. Since the divisions merged 1999, a single Coach of the Year has been named.

== Pitcher of the Year ==
The Pitcher of the Year award is given annually to the Pac-12's best pitcher, as chosen by a vote of the conference's coaches. From 1991 to 1998, the South Division presented this award while the North did not.

== Player of the Year ==
The Player of the Year award is given annually to the Pac-12's best position player, as chosen by a vote of the conference's coaches. It was first presented in 1978. From 1978 and 1998, a Player of the Year was named in both the North and South Divisions. Since the divisions merged 1999, a single Player of the Year has been named. Both pitchers and position players were eligible for this award through 1990 (in the South) and 1998 (in the North).

== Newcomer of the Year ==
The Newcomer of the Year award is given annually to an outstanding freshman or transfer, as chosen by a vote of the conference's coaches. It was first presented in 2000, then took a year off, but has been presented regularly since 2002. Both pitchers and position players are eligible.
