= 2007 Atlanta Braves season =

2007 Atlanta Braves
- League: National League
- Division: East
- Ballpark: Turner Field
- City: Atlanta
- Record: 84–78 (.519)
- Divisional place: 3rd
- Owners: Liberty Media
- General managers: John Schuerholz
- Managers: Bobby Cox
- Television: FSN South; SportSouth; TBS; Jon Sciambi, Chip Caray, Skip Caray, Pete Van Wieren, Joe Simpson
- Radio: WGST; Jon Sciambi, Chip Caray, Pete Van Wieren, Skip Caray, Joe Simpson, Mark Lemke; WUBL

The 2007 Atlanta Braves season was the 42nd season in Atlanta and the 137th overall. They attempted to recapture the National League East, which they had relinquished in 2006 for the first time since joining the division in 1994. They opened their season with a sweep of the Philadelphia Phillies.

== Offseason ==
=== December ===
- December 3: Signed RHP Tanyon Sturtze to a one-year deal. Sturtze, who had rotator cuff surgery on May 23, 2006, was expected to join the bullpen about a month after the season started.
- December 7: Traded LHP Horacio Ramírez to the Seattle Mariners in exchange for RHP Rafael Soriano. Ramirez, viewed by many within the organization as having great potential, had not lived up to expectations in Atlanta. With this trade, John Schuerholz showed he was going to be aggressive in upgrading the bullpen, a big part of the Braves' struggles in 2006. Soriano owned a 65/21 SO/BB ratio in 60 innings for the Mariners in 2006.
- December 9: Signed OF Willie Harris to a minor league contract and invited him to spring training. At the time, it was assumed that Harris would either be a reserve outfielder in Atlanta or stay in Richmond the entire year. Few people, if any, foresaw the kind of production Harris would have with the Braves after earning playing time due to Ryan Langerhans' departure in a trade with the Oakland Athletics. Many of Harris' previous struggles can be attributed to his playing in the American League, which does not focus as much on "small ball" as the National League. Harris' talents, which center around his speed and his ability to hit for contact, have led him to become a valuable member of the club in 2007.
- December 12: Declined to tender 2007 contract offers to 2B Marcus Giles and RHP Chris Reitsma. Not having received any favorable trade offers for Marcus Giles, the Braves were forced to decline him arbitration, believing that their best option at second base for 2007 was Kelly Johnson, an outfielder in 2005 who did not play at all in 2006 due to Tommy John surgery. Despite many critics' claims that his defense would be abysmal, Johnson has played a fine second base and has proven to be one of the majors' best hitters at his position.
- December 20: Signed UTIL Chris Woodward to a one-year contract. Woodward was expected to be a "super-utility" player for the bench, as he had experience not only at each position in the infield, but had played in the outfield as well.

=== January ===
- January 18: Agreed to terms with OF/1B Craig Wilson on a one-year contract. Wilson was thought mainly to have been added as part of a platoon at first base with rookie Scott Thorman; Thorman is a left-handed batter, while Wilson bats right-handed. He was also available for use as an extra outfielder.
- January 19: Acquired LHP Mike González and nonroster SS Brent Lillibridge from the Pittsburgh Pirates in exchange for 1B Adam LaRoche and nonroster OF Jamie Romak. With Thorman as the heir apparent at first base for the Braves, Schuerholz continued the trend of strengthening the weak bullpen by trading for a reliever in González who, by all accounts, had been a shut-down closer for Pittsburgh in 2006. Notable statistics for González in that year: 64/31 SO/BB ratio, converted all 24 save opportunities, and allowed 1 home run in 54 innings. Lillibridge ranked #93 in Baseball America's Top 100 Prospects list for the 2007 season.

=== March ===
- March 9: Agreed to terms with LHP Mark Redman on a one-year contract. Schuerholz decided to take a chance on free agent Redman, a former All-Star with the Kansas City Royals, to shore up the back end of the rotation.
- March 22: Signed C Brian McCann to a six-year contract with a club option for a seventh season. As is becoming the case ever more frequently with many major league clubs, the Braves opted to lock up a promising young player in McCann with a long-term deal to avoid both arbitration and free agency hassles.
- March 23: Acquired RHP Erik Cordier from the Royals in exchange for INF Tony Peña Jr. Peña was out of options in Atlanta, meaning that if he did not make the Braves' 25-man roster out of Spring training, he would have had to clear waivers to be assigned to the minor leagues. At that point, any other club would have had the opportunity to claim him off waivers. By acquiring Cordier, a once-highly regarded prospect before having Tommy John surgery, the Braves at least gained some value for Peña, who was not likely earn a spot on the 25-man roster.

== Regular season ==
=== Season summary ===
==== April ====
The team had a great April to open the season, finishing the month with a 16–9 record. They also won both series against the rival Mets that month. Three of the four victories in those series were comeback wins. They were 2 games ahead of the Mets for first-place at the end of the month.

==== May ====
The Braves started off the month red-hot by winning 8 of their first 11 games, which included five straight wins from May 8–12. It was their first five-game winning streak since July 2006. The team finished out the month by winning just 6 of their final 17 games, however, which included a sweep at home at the hands of the Phillies (whom they had swept at the beginning of the season). The Braves ended with a .500 record for the month, at 14–14.

==== June ====
Interleague play during mid-June saw the Braves struggle, finishing with an NL-worst 4–11 record. The team lost 7 out of 8 games, including a stretch in which they scored just a single run in a five-game span. On June 24, the Braves fell to .500 for the first time during the season. The month ended on a positive note, however, as the Braves took five straight games from the Washington Nationals and the Florida Marlins. During those five games, the Braves scored 41 runs. The Braves finished the month four games behind the Mets in the divisional standings.

==== July ====
On July 5, Chipper Jones surpassed Dale Murphy for the Atlanta club record of 372 home runs by belting 2 against the Los Angeles Dodgers. The Braves went into the All-Star break with a record of 47–42, 2 games behind the New York Mets. After the break, the Braves swept the Pirates in three games, then were immediately swept by the last-place Cincinnati Reds.

On July 18, Julio Franco was signed as a free agent. On July 21, Willie Harris went 6-for-6 with 6 RBIs to become the seventh player in franchise history to go 6-for-6 in a 14–6 win over the St. Louis Cardinals.

On July 31, the Braves acquired 1B Mark Teixeira and LHP Ron Mahay from the Texas Rangers for C Jarrod Saltalamacchia, SS Elvis Andrus, LHP Matt Harrison, RHP Neftalí Feliz, and LHP Beau Jones. Saltalamacchia, Andrus, and Harrison were rated as the top three prospects in the organization at the start of the season by Baseball America. Later in the day, they acquired RHP Octavio Dotel from the Kansas City Royals for RHP Kyle Davies. In the final deal before the deadline, Atlanta traded LHPs Wilfredo Ledezma and Will Startup to the San Diego Padres for LHP Royce Ring.

==== August ====
The Braves went through a disappointing August going 13–15. They suffered a terrible loss on August 2 losing to the Houston Astros 12–11 in 14 innings in which Édgar Rentería left with an ankle sprain which kept him out for a month. Yunel Escobar took his spot and fared similarly to Rentería and on August 5, he hit a walk-off single against the Colorado Rockies in 10 innings. On August 16, Jeff Francoeur, wore a jersey with his name misspelled on it. The "e" and "u" in his name switched, went 0-for-4 with the Braves in a game against the Giants. At the end of the month, they were 5 1/2 games back of the Mets for first place.

==== September ====
After dropping the first two games of September to the rival New York Mets, the Braves won 14 of their next 20 games to pull within only three games of the wild card. The Braves could not keep up this blistering pace however, dropping four of their last five games, eliminating themselves from playoff contention. The Braves did use the late season roster expansion to bring up young OF prospect Brandon Jones, a possible replacement for outfielder Andruw Jones, whose contract expired in 2007, and won't be renewed because his batting statistics tumbled in 2007. The Braves final game of the season took place on September 30, and the Braves lost to the Houston Astros, 3–0. This was also the final Braves game broadcast nationally by TBS, ending more than 30 years of nationally televised Atlanta Braves baseball.

== Postseason ==
=== October ===
On October 11, John Schuerholz gave up the GM job after 17 years to become team president, signing a four-year contract. The new GM Frank Wren, signed a four-year contract after eight years as Assistant GM.

== Season standings ==
=== National League East ===
NL East
Team	W	L	Pct.	GB	Home	Road
Philadelphia Phillies	89	73	.549	—	47‍–‍34	42‍–‍39
New York Mets	88	74	.543	1	41‍–‍40	47‍–‍34
Atlanta Braves	84	78	.519	5	44‍–‍37	40‍–‍41
Washington Nationals	73	89	.451	16	40‍–‍41	33‍–‍48
Florida Marlins	71	91	.438	18	36‍–‍45	35‍–‍46

=== Record vs. opponents ===
2007 National League record Source: MLB Standings Grid – 2007
Team	AZ	ATL	CHC	CIN	COL	FLA	HOU	LAD	MIL	NYM	PHI	PIT	SD	SF	STL	WAS	AL
Arizona	—	4–2	4–2	2–4	8–10	6–1	5–2	8–10	2–5	3–4	5–1	5–4	10–8	10–8	4–3	6–1	8–7
Atlanta	2–4	—	5–4	1–6	4–2	10–8	3–3	4–3	5–2	9–9	9–9	5–1	5–2	4–3	3–4	11–7	4–11
Chicago	2–4	4–5	—	9–9	5–2	0–6	8–7	2–5	9–6	2–5	3–4	8–7	3–5	5–2	11–5	6–1	8–4
Cincinnati	4–2	6–1	9–9	—	2–4	4–3	4–11	2–4	8–7	2–5	2–4	9–7	2–4	4–3	6–9	1–6	7-11
Colorado	10–8	2–4	2–5	4–2	—	3–3	3–4	12–6	4–2	4–2	4–3	4–3	11–8	10–8	3–4	4–3	10–8
Florida	1–6	8–10	6–0	3–4	3–3	—	2–3	4–3	2–5	7–11	9–9	3–4	3–4	1–6	2–4	8–10	9–9
Houston	2–5	3–3	7–8	11–4	4–3	3-2	—	4–3	5–13	2–5	3–3	5–10	4–3	2–4	7–9	2–5	9–9
Los Angeles	10–8	3–4	5–2	4–2	6–12	3–4	3–4	—	3–3	5–5	4–2	5–2	8–10	10–8	3–3	5–1	5–10
Milwaukee	5–2	2–5	6–9	7–8	2–4	5–2	13–5	3–3	—	2–4	3–4	10–6	2–5	4–5	7–8	4–2	8–7
New York	4–3	9–9	5–2	5–2	2–4	11–7	5–2	5–5	4–2	—	6–12	4–2	2–4	4–2	5–2	9–9	8–7
Philadelphia	1-5	9–9	4–3	4–2	3–4	9–9	3–3	2–4	4–3	12–6	—	4–2	4–3	4–4	6–3	12–6	8–7
Pittsburgh	4–5	1–5	7–8	7–9	3–4	4–3	10–5	2–5	6–10	2–4	2–4	—	1–6	4–2	6–12	4–2	5–10
San Diego	8–10	2–5	5–3	4–2	8–11	4–3	3–4	10–8	5–2	4–2	3–4	6–1	—	14–4	3–4	4–2	6–9
San Francisco	8–10	3–4	2–5	3–4	8–10	6–1	4–2	8–10	5–4	2–4	4–4	2–4	4–14	—	4–1	3–4	5–10
St. Louis	3–4	4–3	5–11	9–6	4–3	4-2	9–7	3–3	8–7	2–5	3–6	12–6	4–3	1–4	—	1–5	6–9
Washington	1–6	7–11	1–6	6–1	3–4	10-8	5–2	1–5	2–4	9–9	6–12	2–4	2–4	4–3	5–1	—	9–9

== Roster ==
2007 Atlanta Braves
Roster
Pitchers: 46 Manny Acosta; 57 José Ascanio; 30 Kevin Barry; 30 Jeff Bennett; 48 Blaine Boyer; 38 Buddy Carlyle; 37 Steve Colyer; 40 Lance Cormier; 26 Kyle Davies; 27 Joey Devine; 26 Octavio Dotel; 51 Mike Gonzalez; 15 Tim Hudson; 36 Chuck James; 49 Wilfredo Ledezma; 50 Anthony Lerew; 49 Ron Mahay; 49 Macay McBride; 58 Peter Moylan; 54 Chad Paronto; 19 Mark Redman; 37 Jo-Jo Reyes; 46 Royce Ring; 29 John Smoltz; 39 Rafael Soriano; 56 Óscar Villarreal; 28 Bob Wickman; 33 Tyler Yates	Catchers: 16 Brian McCann; 27 Corky Miller; 8 Brayan Peña; 18 Jarrod Saltalamacchia; 18 Clint Sammons; Infielders: 19 Yunel Escobar; 14 Julio Franco; 2 Kelly Johnson; 10 Chipper Jones; 4 Pete Orr; 1 Martín Prado; 11 Édgar Rentería; 24 Mark Teixeira; 20 Scott Thorman; 38 Craig Wilson; 5 Chris Woodward	Outfielders: 23 Matt Diaz; 7 Jeff Francoeur; 22 Willie Harris; 25 Andruw Jones; 28 Brandon Jones; 18 Ryan Langerhans	Manager: 6 Bobby Cox; Coaches: 52 Chino Cadahia (bench); 59 Frank Fultz (conditioning); 17 Glenn Hubbard (first base); 45 Roger McDowell (pitching); 9 Terry Pendleton (hitting); 12 Eddie Pérez (bullpen); 43 Brian Snitker (third base)

== Game log ==
2007 Regular Season game log
April (16–9)

#	Date	Time	Opponent	Score	Win	Loss	Save	Attendance	Record	TV	Radio
1	April 2	@ Phillies	5–3 (10)	Wickman (1–0)	Madson (0–1)	Paronto (1)	44,742	2:57	1–0	TBS	WGST/WUBL
2	April 4	@ Phillies	3–2 (11)	McBride (1–0)	Madson (0–2)	Wickman (1)	41,516	3:16	2–0	FSN South	WGST/WUBL
3	April 5	@ Phillies	8–4	James (1–0)	Eaton (0–1)	Soriano (1)	30,062	3:10	3–0	TBS	WGST/WUBL
4	April 6	Mets	1–11	Pérez (1–0)	Redman (0–1)		51,014	2:59	3–1	TBS	WGST/WUBL
5	April 7	Mets	5–3	Smoltz (1–0)	Glavine (1–1)	Wickman (2)	43,156	3:13	4–1	FOX	WGST/WUBL
6	April 8	Mets	3–2	Soriano (1–0)	Heilman (0–1)	Wickman (3)	24,832	2:59	5–1	TBS	WGST/WUBL
7	April 10	Nationals	8–0	Hudson (1–0)	Chico (0–1)		18,396	2:52	6–1	TBS	WGST/WUBL
8	April 11	Nationals	8–3	James (2–0)	Williams (0–2)		15,631	2:47	7–1	FSN South	WGST/WUBL
9	April 12	Nationals	0–2	Colomé (1–0)	Smoltz (1–1)	Cordero (1)	23,897	2:42	7–2	TBS	WGST/WUBL
10	April 13	Marlins	4–11	Willis (3–0)	Redman (0–2)		33,212	2:52	7–3	TBS	WGST/WUBL
–	April 14	Marlins	Rescheduled for June 5						7–3		
12	April 15	Marlins	8–4	Hudson (2–0)	Olsen (2–1)		25,189	2:57	8–3	TBS	WGST/WUBL
13	April 16	@ Nationals	1–5	Chico (1–1)	James (2–1)		16,316	2:35	8–4	SportSouth	WGST/WUBL
14	April 17	@ Nationals	6–4	Smoltz (2–1)	Williams (0–3)	Wickman (4)	17,791	3:10	9–4	SportSouth	WGST/WUBL
15	April 18	Cubs	8–6	Villarreal (1–0)	Eyre (0–1)	Wickman (5)	26,837	3:09	10–4	FSN South	WGST/WUBL
16	April 19	Cubs	0–3	Hill (3–0)	Redman (0–3)	Dempster (3)	31,603	2:27	10–5	TBS	WGST/WUBL
17	April 20	@ Mets	7–3	Hudson (3–0)	Pelfrey (0–1)		47,547	2:55	11–5	TBS	WGST/WUBL
18	April 21	@ Mets	2–7	Pérez (2–1)	James (2–2)		55,143	2:48	11–6	SportSouth	WGST/WUBL
19	April 22	@ Mets	9–6	Yates (1–0)	Heilman (1–2)	Wickman (6)	55,671	3:21	12–6	TBS	WGST/WUBL
20	April 23	@ Marlins	7–8	Willis (4–1)	Davies (0–1)	Pinto (1)	13,227	2:48	12–7	SportSouth	WGST/WUBL
21	April 24	@ Marlins	11–6	Moylan (1–0)	Lindstrom (0–1)		11,507	3:09	13–7	TBS	WGST/WUBL
22	April 25	@ Marlins	3–4	Owens (1–0)	Wickman (1–1)		13,310	2:23	13–8	FSN South	WGST/WUBL
23	April 27	@ Rockies	9–7	James (3–2)	Francis (1–3)	Moylan (1)	25,079	3:09	14–8	TBS	WGST/WUBL
24	April 28	@ Rockies	6–2	Smoltz (3–1)	Hirsh (2–2)		28,178	2:29	15–8	TBS	WGST/WUBL
25	April 29	@ Rockies	7–9 (11)	Bautista (1–0)	Colyer (0–1)		31,445	3:40	15–9	TBS	WGST/WUBL
26	April 30	Phillies	5–2	González (1–0)	Alfonseca (1–1)		20,354	2:24	16–9	SportSouth	WGST/WUBL

May (14–14)

#	Date	Time	Opponent	Score	Win	Loss	Save	Attendance	Record	TV	Radio
27	May 1	Phillies	4–6	Hamels (3–1)	Redman (0–4)	Gordon (5)	19,670	3:18	16–10	FSN South	WGST/WUBL
28	May 2	Phillies	4–3	Paronto (1–0)	García (1–2)	Soriano (2)	23,647	2:49	17–10	FSN South	WGST/WUBL
29	May 4	Dodgers	4–0	Smoltz (4–1)	Tomko (0–3)		38,263	2:39	18–10	TBS	WGST/WUBL
30	May 5	Dodgers	3–6	Lowe (3–3)	Hudson (3–1)	Saito (9)	42,786	2:51	18–11	TBS	WGST/WUBL
31	May 6	Dodgers	6–4	Paronto (2–0)	Tsao (0–1)	González (1)	33,350	2:57	18–12	TBS	WGST/WUBL
32	May 7	Padres	2–4	Young (4–2)	James (3–3)	Hoffman (9)	19,189	3:00	19–12	SportSouth	WGST/WUBL
33	May 8	Padres	3–2	González (2–0)	Bell (0–1)	Soriano (3)	21,748	2:13	20–12	SportSouth	WGST/WUBL
34	May 9	Padres	3–2	Smoltz (5–1)	Meredith (1–1)	Soriano (4)	36,523	2:13	21–12	FSN South	WGST/WUBL
35	May 10	Padres	5–3	Hudson (4–1)	Wells (1–2)	Soriano (5)	28,799	2:39	22–12	TBS	WGST/WUBL
36	May 11	@ Pirates	4–1	Davies (1–1)	Duke (1–4)	González (2)	23,376	2:35	23–12	TBS	WGST/WUBL
37	May 12	@ Pirates	9–2	James (4–3)	Armas (0–3)		34,775	2:19	24–12	SportSouth	WGST/WUBL
38	May 13	@ Pirates	2–13	Snell (3–2)	Lerew (0–1)		19,484	2:45	24–13	TBS	WGST/WUBL
39	May 14	@ Nationals	1–2	Bergmann (1–3)	Smoltz (5–2)	Colomé (1)	18,829	2:08	24–14	SportSouth	WGST/WUBL
40	May 15	@ Nationals	6–2	Hudson (5–1)	Williams (0–5)		21,258	2:40	25–14	SportSouth	WGST/WUBL
41	May 16	@ Nationals	4–6	Traber (1–0)	Davies (1–2)	Rauch (2)	20,329	2:29	25–15	FSN South	WGST/WUBL
42	May 17	@ Nationals	3–4	Chico (3–4)	Paronto (2–1)	Rauch (3)	24,631	2:36	25–16	TBS	WGST/WUBL
–	May 18	@ Red Sox	Rescheduled for May 19						25–16		
43	May 19	@ Red Sox	3–13	Matsuzaka (6–2)	Lerew (0–2)		36,358	3:02	25–17	SportSouth	WGST/WUBL
44	May 19	@ Red Sox	14–0	Smoltz (6–2)	Hansack (0–1)		36,792	3:01	26–17	SportSouth	WGST/WUBL
45	May 20	@ Red Sox	3–6	Gabbard (1–0)	Hudson (5–2)		36,140	3:05	26–18	TBS	WGST/WUBL
46	May 22	Mets	8–1	Davies (2–2)	Sosa (3–1)		32,587	2:29	27–18	TBS	WGST/WUBL
47	May 23	Mets	0–3	Pérez (6–3)	James (4–4)	Wagner (11)	30,489	2:49	27–19	TBS	WGST/WUBL
48	May 24	Mets	2–1	Smoltz (7–2)	Glavine (5–2)	Wickman (7)	36,660	2:33	28–19	TBS	WGST/WUBL
49	May 25	Phillies	3–8	Moyer (5–3)	Hudson (5–3)		35,402	2:58	28–19	SportSouth	WGST/WUBL
50	May 26	Phillies	4–6	Eaton (5–3)	Carlyle (0–1)	Alfonseca (1)	40,122	2:51	28–20	FOX	WGST/WUBL
51	May 27	Phillies	6–13	Hamels (7–2)	Davies (2–3)		38,058	3:05	28–21	TBS	WGST/WUBL
52	May 28	@ Brewers	2–1	James (5–4)	Capuano (5–4)	Wickman (8)	41,139	2:37	29–21	TBS	WGST/WUBL
53	May 29	@ Brewers	4–5	Sheets (5–3)	Moylan (1–1)	Cordero (18)	27,559	3:01	29–22	FSN South	WGST/WUBL
54	May 30	@ Brewers	9–3	Hudson (6–3)	Turnbow (1–3)		32,758	2:44	30–22	TBS	WGST/WUBL

June (13–15)

#	Date	Time	Opponent	Score	Win	Loss	Save	Attendance	Record	TV	Radio
55	June 1	@ Cubs	8–5	Davies (3–3)	Zambrano (5–5)		39,523	2:58	31–22	TBS	WGST/WUBL
56	June 2	@ Cubs	5–3	Yates (2–0)	Ohman (0–3)	Wickman (9)	40,290	2:40	32–22	SportSouth	WGST/WUBL
57	June 3	@ Cubs	1–10	Marshall (1–2)	Cormier (0–1)		40,155	2:36	32–23	TBS	WGST/WUBL
58	June 4	Marlins	4–6	Obermueller (2–3)	Hudson (6–4)	Gregg (8)	22,175	2:44	32–24	SportSouth	WGST/WUBL
11	June 5	Marlins	3–1	Carlyle (1–1)	Pinto (0–3)	Wickman (10)	20,863	2:20	33–24	SportSouth	WGST/WUBL
59	June 5	Marlins	1–5	VandenHurk (1–1)	Smoltz (7–3)		27,072	2:27	33–25	SportSouth	WGST/WUBL
60	June 6	Marlins	4–7	Miller (1–0)	Davies (3–4)	Gregg (9)	28,026	3:10	33–26	FSN South	WGST/WUBL
61	June 7	Cubs	1–2	Hill (5–4)	James (5–5)	Dempster (12)	32,902	2:14	33–27	SportSouth	WGST/WUBL
62	June 8	Cubs	1–9	Marshall (2–2)	Cormier (0–2)		37,123	2:58	33–28	TBS	WGST/WUBL
63	June 9	Cubs	9–5	Moylan (2–1)	Marquis (5–3)		51,816	3:09	34–28	SportSouth	WGST/WUBL
64	June 10	Cubs	5–4	Paronto (3–1)	Dempster (1–3)	Wickman (11)	32,752	3:05	35–28	ESPN	WGST/WUBL
65	June 12	@ Twins	3–7	Slowey (2–0)	Davies (3–5)		25,868	2:39	35–29	SportSouth	WGST/WUBL
66	June 13	@ Twins	0–6	Silva (4–7)	James (5–6)		27,903	2:10	35–30	FSN South	WGST/WUBL
67	June 14	@ Twins	2–3	Reyes (1–1)	Wickman (1–2)		26,714	2:35	35–31	TBS	WGST/WUBL
68	June 15	@ Indians	5–4	Soriano (2–0)	Sabathia (9–2)	Wickman (12)	34,848	2:58	36–31	SportSouth	WGST/WUBL
69	June 16	@ Indians	6–2	Smoltz (8–3)	Byrd (6–3)		35,153	2:48	37–31	FOX	WGST/WBL
70	June 17	@ Indians	2–5	Carmona (8–2)	Davies (3–6)	Borowski (20)	33,429	2:51	37–32	TBS	WGST/WUBL
71	June 18	Red Sox	9–4	James (6–6)	Schilling (6–4)		47,562	3:11	38–32	ESPN	WGST/WUBL
72	June 19	Red Sox	0–4	Beckett (10–1)	Hudson (6–5)		47,910	2:57	38–33	SportSouth	WGST/WUBL
73	June 20	Red Sox	0–11	Tavárez (5–4)	Carlyle (1–2)		49,585	2:46	38–34	FSN South	WGST/WUBL
74	June 22	Tigers	0–5	Rogers (1–0)	Smoltz (8–4)		44,034	2:37	38–35	SportSouth	WGST/WUBL
75	June 23	Tigers	1–2	Verlander (8–2)	Davies (3–7)	Jones (18)	49,074	2:51	38–36	FOX	WGST/WUBL
76	June 24	Tigers	0–5	Miller (3–1)	James (6–7)	Durbin (1)	34,181	2:52	38–37	ESPN	WGST/WUBL
77	June 25	Nationals	4–1	Hudson (7–5)	Bergmann (1–4)	Wickman (13)	25,375	2:29	39–38	SportSouth	WGST/WUBL
78	June 26	Nationals	6–2	Carlyle (2–2)	Bacsik (1–5)	Wickman (14)	22,508	2:39	40–38	SportSouth	WGST/WUBL
79	June 27	Nationals	13–0	Smoltz (9–4)	Bowie (4–3)		29,144	3:08	41–38	FSN South	WGST/WUBL
80	June 29	@ Marlins	12–3	James (7–7)	Johnson (0–3)		17,181	3:16	42–38	SportSouth	WGST/WUBL
81	June 30	@ Marlins	6–5	Hudson (8–5)	Benítez (2–4)	Yates (1)	24,229	3:25	43–38	TBS	WGST/WUBL

July (13–13)

#	Date	Time	Opponent	Score	Win	Loss	Save	Attendance	Record	TV	Radio
82	July 1	@ Marlins	5–6 (10)	Gardner (2–2)	Soriano (2–1)		14,311	3:17	43–39	TBS	WGST/WUBL
83	July 2	@ Dodgers	2–8	Beimel (2–1)	Smoltz (9–5)		40,571	3:03	43–40	SportSouth	WGST/WUBL
84	July 3	@ Dodgers	6–7	Seánez (5–1)	Ledezma (0–1)	Saito (23)	43,052	2:50	43–41	TBS	WGST/WUBL
85	July 4	@ Dodgers	5–2	James (8–7)	Hendrickson (2–4)	Wickman (15)	56,000	3:08	44–41	FSN South	WGST/WUBL
86	July 5	@ Dodgers	8–6	Moylan (3–1)	Stults (0–1)	Wickman (16)	41,052	3:28	45–41	TBS	WGST/WUBL
87	July 6	@ Padres	7–4	Carlyle (3–2)	Germano (5–3)		37,526	2:36	46–41	TBS	WGST/WUBL
88	July 7	@ Padres	5–8	Bell (3–2)	Yates (2–1)	Hoffman (25)	41,419	2:52	46–42	FOX	WGST/WUBL
89	July 8	@ Padres	5–4	Davies (4–7)	Maddux (7–6)		41,026	2:34	47–42	ESPN	WGST/WUBL
–	July 10	2007 Major League Baseball All-Star Game in San Francisco, California									
90	July 13	Pirates	9–1	Hudson (9–5)	Snell (7–6)		38,922	2:28	48–42	TBS	WGST/WUBL
91	July 14	Pirates	5–4	Wickman (2–2)	Chacón (4–2)		44,041	2:54	49–42	SportSouth	WGST/WUBL
92	July 15	Pirates	5–1	Carlyle (4–2)	Maholm (5–12)		30,756	2:17	50–42	TBS	WGST/WUBL
93	July 16	Reds	3–10	Livingston (2–0)	Davies (4–8)		24,442	3:16	50–43	SportSouth	WGST/WUBL
94	July 17	Reds	5–6	Arroyo (4–10)	Reyes (0–1)	Weathers (18)	30,072	2:39	50–44	SportSouth	WGST/WUBL
95	July 18	Reds	4–5 (15)	Gosling (1–0)	Ascanio (0–1)		33,789	4:31	50–45	TBS	WGST/WUBL
96	July 19	Cardinals	10–1	Hudson (10–5)	Maroth (5–5)		41,171	2:32	51–45	FSN South	WGST/WUBL
97	July 20	Cardinals	2–4	Wainwright (9–7)	Soriano (2–2)	Isringhausen (19)	42,712	2:39	51–46	FSN South	WGST/WUBL
98	July 21	Cardinals	14–6	Carlyle (5–2)	Looper (7–8)		53,953	3:22	52–46	SportSouth	WGST/WUBL
99	July 22	Cardinals	2–7 (10)	Isringhausen (4–0)	Yates (2–2)		39,181	3:25	52–47	ESPN	WGST/WUBL
100	July 23	@ Giants	4–2	Smoltz (10–5)	Cain (3–12)	Wickman (17)	42,679	2:40	53–47	SportSouth	WGST/WUBL
101	July 24	@ Giants	7–5 (13)	Moylan (4–1)	Sánchez (1–2)	Yates (2)	43,072	4:08	54–47	TBS	WGST/WUBL
102	July 25	@ Giants	1–2	Lowry (11–7)	James (8–8)	Hennessey (7)	42,834	2:27	54–48	TBS	WGST/WUBL
103	July 26	@ Giants	2–4	Lincecum (6–2)	Carlyle (5–3)	Hennessey (8)	42,366	2:33	54–49	TBS	WGST/WUBL
104	July 27	@ D-backs	7–8 (11)	González (4–2)	Ledezma (0–2)		27,151	3:40	54–50	TBS	WGST/WUBL
105	July 28	@ D-backs	3–4 (10)	Cruz (5–1)	Yates (2–3)		33,664	3:08	54–51	FOX	WGST/WUBL
106	July 29	@ D-backs	14–0	Hudson (11–5)	Hernández (6–7)		30,535	2:34	55–51	TBS	WGST/WUBL
107	July 31	Astros	12–4	James (9–8)	Sampson (7–8)		32,315	2:41	56–51	SportSouth	WGST/WUBL

August (13–15)

#	Date	Time	Opponent	Score	Win	Loss	Save	Attendance	Record	TV	Radio
108	August 1	Astros	12–3	Carlyle (6–3)	Rodríguez (7–10)		30,785	2:52	57–51	FSN South	WGST/WUBL
109	August 2	Astros	11–12 (14)	McLemore (1–0)	Villarreal (1–1)	Moehler (1)	35,659	4:59	57–52	TBS	WGST/WUBL
110	August 3	Rockies	2–9	Francis (12–5)	Smoltz (10–6)		37,481	2:59	57–53	TBS	WGST/WUBL
111	August 4	Rockies	6–4	Hudson (12–5)	Jiménez (1–1)	Wickman (18)	50,647	3:02	58–53	SportSouth	WGST/WUBL
112	August 5	Rockies	6–5 (10)	Villarreal (2–1)	Buchholz (5–4)		37,089	3:28	59–53	TBS	WGST/WUBL
113	August 7	@ Mets	7–3	Carlyle (7–3)	Pérez (10–8)		52,177	2:45	60–53	SportSouth	WGST/WUBL
114	August 8	@ Mets	3–4	Heilman (7–3)	Soriano (2–3)	Wagner (26)	51,749	2:48	60–54	FSN South	WGST/WUBL
115	August 9	@ Mets	7–6	Hudson (13–5)	Maine (12–7)	Villarreal (1)	52,425	3:12	61–54	TBS	WGST/WUBL
116	August 10	@ Phillies	4–5	Hamels (13–5)	Moylan (4–2)	Gordon (6)	40,844	2:24	61–55	TBS	WGST/WUBL
117	August 11	@ Phillies	7–5	Mahay (1–0)	Eaton (9–8)	Wickman (19)	44,948	2:56	62–55	SportSouth	WGST/WUBL
118	August 12	@ Phillies	3–5	Moyer (11–8)	Carlyle (7–4)	Myers (9)	45,053	2:38	62–56	ESPN	WGST/WUBL
119	August 14	Giants	5–4	Wickman (3–2)	Kline (0–2)		36,186	3:00	63–56	SportSouth	WGST/WUBL
120	August 15	Giants	6–3	Hudson (14–5)	Ortiz (2–3)	Wickman (20)	33,841	2:45	64–56	FSN South	WGST/WUBL
121	August 16	Giants	3–9	Lincecum (7–3)	James (9–9)		36,419	2:31	64–57	TBS	WGST/WUBL
122	August 17	D-backs	0–4	Webb (13–8)	Cormier (0–3)		33,248	2:17	64–58	SportSouth	WGST/WUBL
123	August 18	D-backs	6–12	Owings (6–6)	Carlyle (7–5)		48,643	2:41	64–59	SportSouth	WGST/WUBL
124	August 19	D-backs	6–2	Smoltz (11–6)	Petit (2–4)		30,818	2:53	65–59	TBS	WGST/WUBL
125	August 20	@ Reds	14–4	Hudson (15–5)	Dumatrait (0–2)		24,477	2:50	66–59	SportSouth	WGST/WUBL
126	August 21	@ Reds	7–8	Bray (3–0)	Moylan (4–3)	Weathers (26)	21,039	2:40	66–60	SportSouth	WGST/WUBL
127	August 22	@ Reds	2–4	Arroyo (7–13)	Cormier (0–4)	Weathers (27)	22,924	2:36	66–61	FSN South	WGST/WUBL
128	August 23	@ Reds	7–9 (12)	Gosling (2–0)	Wickman (3–3)		22,052	3:46	66–62	SportSouth	WGST/WUBL
129	August 24	@ Cardinals	7–2	Smoltz (12–6)	Wells (6–14)		44,032	2:53	67–62	SportSouth	WGST/WUBL
130	August 25	@ Cardinals	4–5	Springer (7–1)	Hudson (15–6)	Isringhausen (26)	45,441	2:57	67–63	SportSouth	WGST/WUBL
131	August 26	@ Cardinals	1–4	Wainwright (12–9)	Reyes (0–2)	Isringhausen (27)	43,934	2:27	67–64	TBS	WGST/WUBL
132	August 27	@ Marlins	13–2	Cormier (1–4)	Olsen (9–12)		11,716	2:39	68–64	SportSouth	WGST/WUBL
133	August 28	@ Marlins	3–4 (11)	Kim (7–6)	Villarreal (2–2)		11,539	3:12	68–65	SportSouth	WGST/WUBL
134	August 29	@ Marlins	7–4	Carlyle (8–5)	Willis (8–14)	Soriano (6)	12,633	2:52	69–65	FSN South	WGST/WUBL
135	August 31	Mets	1–7	Maine (14–8)	Hudson (15–7)		45,245	2:32	69–66	SportSouth	WGST/WUBL

September (15–12)

#	Date	Time	Opponent	Score	Win	Loss	Save	Attendance	Record	TV	Radio
136	September 1	Mets	1–5	Pelfrey (1–7)	James (9–10)	Feliciano (2)	45,611	2:29	69–67	FOX	WGST/WUBL
137	September 2	Mets	2–3	Glavine (12–6)	Smoltz (12–7)	Wagner (30)	46,242	2:47	69–68	TBS	WGST/WUBL
138	September 3	Phillies	5–1	Cormier (2–4)	Moyer (12–11)		31,592	2:51	70–68	TBS	WGST/WUBL
139	September 4	Phillies	2–5	Lohse (8–12)	Carlyle (8–6)	Myers (14)	22,130	2:57	70–69	SportSouth	WGST/WUBL
140	September 5	Phillies	9–8	Soriano (3–3)	Myers (3–6)		22,115	3:46	71–69	TBS	WGST/WUBL
141	September 7	Nationals	7–1	Smoltz (13–7)	Hanrahan (4–2)		31,116	2:49	72–69	FSN South	WGST/WUBL
142	September 8	Nationals	9–2	James (10–10)	Chico (5–8)		36,940	2:45	73–69	TBS	WGST/WUBL
143	September 9	Nationals	4–7	Bergmann (4–5)	Cormier (2–5)	Cordero (32)	31,582	2:59	73–70	TBS	WGST/WUBL
144	September 10	@ Mets	2–3	Pérez (14–9)	Hudson (15–8)	Wagner (33)	48,557	2:36	73–71	SportSouth	WGST/WUBL
145	September 11	@ Mets	13–5	Moylan (5–3)	Hernández (9–5)		48,732	3:03	74–71	SportSouth	WGST/WUBL
146	September 12	@ Mets	3–4	Mota (2–1)	Acosta (0–1)	Wagner (34)	51,648	2:54	74–72	FSN South	WGST/WUBL
147	September 14	@ Nationals	8–5 (13)	Ascanio (1–1)	Colomé (4–1)		18,568	5:13	75–72	SportSouth	WGST/WUBL
148	September 15	@ Nationals	4–7	Bergmann (5–5)	Cormier (2–6)	Cordero (34)	26,866	2:51	75–73	TBS	WGST/WUBL
149	September 16	@ Nationals	3–0	Hudson (16–8)	Hill (4–4)		23,935	2:24	76–73	TBS	WGST/WUBL
150	September 17	Marlins	11–6	Smoltz (14–7)	Kim (9–7)		20,957	2:51	77–73	SportSouth	WGST/WUBL
151	September 18	Marlins	4–3	Reyes (1–2)	Seddon (0–1)	Soriano (7)	22,076	3:10	78–73	SportSouth	WGST/WUBL
152	September 19	Marlins	5–1	James (11–10)	Barone (1–3)		24,449	2:23	79–73	FSN South	WGST/WUBL
153	September 20	Brewers	3–1	Bennett (1–0)	Suppan (10–12)	Soriano (8)	26,595	2:38	80–73	SportSouth	WGST/WUBL
154	September 21	Brewers	1–4	Linebrink (5–6)	T. Hudson (16–9)	F. Cordero (44)	34,401	3:02	80–74	SportSouth	WGST/WUBL
155	September 22	Brewers	4–3 (11)	Devine (1–0)	McClung (0–1)		42,378	3:28	81–74	FOX	WGST/WUBL
156	September 23	Brewers	7–4	Acosta (1–1)	Vargas (11–5)	Soriano (9)	44,088	3:34	82–74	TBS	WGST/WUBL
157	September 25	@ Phillies	10–6	Bennett (2–0)	Moyer (13–12)		39,129	3:09	83–74	SportSouth	WGST/WUBL
158	September 26	@ Phillies	2–5	Lohse (9–12)	Hudson (16–10)	Myers (20)	36,588	2:32	83–75	SportSouth	WGST/WUBL
159	September 27	@ Phillies	4–6	Kendrick (10–4)	Smoltz (14–8)	Myers (21)	40,589	2:34	83–76	SportSouth	WGST/WUBL
160	September 28	@ Astros	7–2	Reyes (2–2)	Albers (4–11)		43,011	3:00	84–76	SportSouth	WGST/WUBL
161	September 29	@ Astros	2–3	Backe (3–1)	Bennett (2–1)	Lidge (19)	43,624	2:35	84–77	SportSouth	WGST/WUBL
162	September 30	@ Astros	0–3	Paulino (2–1)	Carlyle (8–7)	Borkowski (1)	43,823	2:25	84–78	TBS	WGST/WUBL

- Braves Win
- Braves loss
- Game Postponed

== Player stats ==
=== Batting ===
Note: PA=Plate appearances; AB=At bats; H=Hits; HR=Home runs; RBI=Runs batted in; SB=Stolen bases; AVG=Batting average; OBP=On-base percentage; SLG=Slugging percentage.

Player	PA	AB	H	HR	RBI	SB	AVG	OBP	SLG
Jeff Francoeur	696	642	188	19	105	5	.293	.338	.444
Andruw Jones	659	572	127	26	94	5	.222	.311	.413
Kelly Johnson	608	521	144	16	68	9	.276	.375	.457
Chipper Jones	600	513	173	29	102	5	.337	.425	.604
Brian McCann	552	504	136	18	92	0	.270	.320	.452
Édgar Rentería	543	494	164	12	57	11	.332	.390	.470
Willie Harris	391	344	93	2	32	17	.270	.349	.392
Matt Diaz	384	358	121	12	45	4	.338	.368	.497
Yunel Escobar	355	319	104	5	28	5	.326	.385	.451
Scott Thorman	307	287	62	11	36	1	.216	.258	.394
Mark Teixeira*	240	208	66	17	56	0	.317	.404	.615
Jarrod Saltalamacchia	153	141	40	4	12	0	.284	.333	.411
Chris Woodward	151	136	27	1	8	1	.199	.252	.279
Pete Orr	69	65	13	0	2	1	.200	.235	.215
Martín Prado	62	59	17	0	2	0	.288	.323	.339
Craig Wilson	69	58	10	1	2	0	.172	.304	.259
Ryan Langerhans	52	44	3	0	1	0	.068	.192	.091
Julio Franco	45	40	10	0	8	0	.250	.311	.325
Brayan Peña	33	33	7	1	3	0	.212	.212	.303
Corky Miller	29	27	7	1	4	0	.259	.310	.444
Brandon Jones	21	19	3	0	4	0	.158	.190	.211
Clint Sammons	3	3	2	0	0	0	.667	.667	1.000
Pitcher totals	352	302	45	1	20	64	.149	.179	.179
Team totals	6374	5689	1562	176	781	64	.275	.339	.435

*With Atlanta.

=== Pitching ===
Note: G=Games pitched; GS=Games started; W=Wins; L=Losses; IP=Innings pitched; H/9=Hits per 9 IP; R=Runs allowed; ER=Earned runs allowed; BB/9=Walks per 9 IP; SO/9=Strikeouts per 9 IP; ERA=Earned run average

Player	G	GS	W	L	IP	H/9	R	ER	BB/9	SO/9	ERA
Tim Hudson	34	34	16	10	224 1/3	8.87	87	83	2.13	5.30	3.33
John Smoltz	32	32	14	8	205 2/3	8.58	78	71	2.06	8.62	3.11
Chuck James	30	30	11	10	161 1/3	9.15	77	76	3.24	6.47	4.24
Buddy Carlyle	22	20	8	7	107	9.84	67	62	2.69	6.22	5.21
Peter Moylan	80	0	5	3	90	6.50	27	18	3.10	6.30	1.80
Kyle Davies	17	17	4	8	86	9.63	61	55	4.60	6.17	5.76
Óscar Villarreal	51	0	4	2	76 1/3	8.84	40	36	3.77	6.84	4.24
Rafael Soriano	71	0	3	3	72	5.88	26	24	1.88	8.75	3.00
Tyler Yates	75	0	2	3	66	8.73	44	38	4.23	9.41	5.18
Jo-Jo Reyes	11	10	2	2	50 2/3	9.77	39	35	5.33	4.80	6.22
Lance Cormier	10	9	2	6	45 2/3	11.04	38	36	4.34	5.32	7.09
Bob Wickman	49	0	3	3	43 2/3	9.89	22	19	4.12	7.21	3.92
Chad Paronto	41	0	3	1	40 1/3	10.49	20	16	4.24	3.12	3.57
Ron Mahay	30	0	1	0	28	6.11	8	7	5.14	7.39	2.25
Manny Acosta	21	0	1	1	23 2/3	4.94	6	6	5.32	8.37	2.28
Mark Redman	6	5	0	4	21 2/3	15.78	29	28	4.57	5.40	11.63
Mike González	18	0	2	0	17	7.94	3	3	4.24	6.88	1.59
José Ascanio	13	0	1	1	16	9.56	11	9	3.38	7.31	5.06
Macay McBride	18	0	1	0	15	8.40	9	6	9.00	10.20	4.20
Jeff Bennett	3	2	2	1	13	9.69	5	5	2.08	9.69	3.46
Anthony Lerew	3	3	0	2	11 2/3	10.80	10	10	5.40	6.94	7.71
Wil Ledezma	12	0	0	2	9 1/3	11.6	10	8	3.9	6.8	7.71
Joey Devine	10	0	1	0	8 1/3	7.6	1	1	8.6	7.6	1.08
Octavio Dotel	9	0	0	0	7 2/3	5.9	5	4	1.2	14.1	4.70
Blaine Boyer	5	0	0	0	5 1/3	16.9	3	2	1.7	5.1	3.38
Royce Ring	11	0	0	0	5	3.6	0	0	5.4	7.2	0.00
Steve Colyer	7	0	0	1	3 2/3	22.1	2	2	9.8	9.8	4.91
Kevin Barry	1	0	0	0	2	27.0	5	5	9.0	18.00	22.50
Team totals	162	162	84	78	1456 1/3	8.9	733	665	3.3	6.8	4.11

== Farm system ==
Level	Team	League	Manager
AAA	Richmond Braves	International League	Dave Brundage
AA	Mississippi Braves	Southern League	Phillip Wellman
A	Myrtle Beach Pelicans	Carolina League	Rocket Wheeler
A	Rome Braves	South Atlantic League	Randy Ingle
Rookie	Danville Braves	Appalachian League	Paul Runge
Rookie	GCL Braves	Gulf Coast League	Luis Ortiz

LEAGUE CHAMPIONS: Richmond
