= Liberty Media =

American mass media company

Liberty Media Corporation
- Type: Public
- Traded as: Nasdaq: FWONA (Series A); OTCQB: FWONB (Series B); Nasdaq: FWONK (Series C); Russell 1000 components (FWONA, FWONK)
- ISIN: US5312297717; US5312297634; US5312297550
- Industry: Mass media
- Predecessor: Tele-Communications Inc.
- Founded: 1991; 35 years ago
- Founder: John C. Malone
- Successors: Liberty companies
- Headquarters: Meridian, Colorado, United States (Note: The postal designation of Englewood, a city in neighboring Arapahoe County, is used in the company's mailing address.)
- Area served: Worldwide
- Key people: John C. Malone (Chairman Emeritus); Robert R. Bennett (Chairman); Derek Chang (CEO)
- Products: Film production; TV production; Broadcasting; Cable television; Sport management
- Revenue: ▲US$8.696 billion (2021)
- Operating income: ▲US$1.977 billion (2021)
- Net income: ▲US$744 million (2021)
- Total assets: ▲US$44.351 billion (2021)
- Total equity: ▼US$18.262 billion (2021)
- Subsidiaries: Formula One Group
- Website: libertymedia.com

Liberty Media Corporation (commonly referred to as Liberty Media or just Liberty) is an American mass media company founded by John C. Malone in 1991. The company is notable for its history of diversified media and entertainment investments, its use of tracking stocks, and the creation of numerous descendant companies through asset spin-offs to shareholders. As of 2026, its primary remaining assets are three global motorsport businesses in the form of Formula One, MotoGP, and World Superbikes.

== History ==
=== 1991–1999 ===
Liberty Media began in March 1991 as a spin-off of Tele-Communications Inc. (TCI), a U.S. cable-television group. Peter Barton, hired by TCI's Malone, served as president until retiring in April 1997. The company took over TCI assets considered to have little value, but Barton completed "a deal every ten days for six years" and made the company a big success. Liberty was merged back into TCI in the mid-1990s. In 1995, Liberty Media acquired a 49% ownership stake in the Faith & Values Channel (which would later be known as the Hallmark Channel), and took over operational control of the network, adding more secular and family-oriented programming. It was rebranded as the Odyssey Network in 1996. On March 13, 1998, Liberty Media Group and TCI Group announced the merger of Encore and STARZ! into a single company—Encore Media Group, owned by Liberty. Encore was taking advantage of the growth of digital cable, while TCI, which had previously owned twenty percent of Encore, was more interested in traditional cable.

After U.S. Department of Justice approval that required TCI to sell its 23.5% interest in Sprint Corporation PSC, TCI was acquired by AT&T on March 9, 1999, for approximately $48 billion. Liberty Media merged with TCI Ventures Group LLC (TCIVA), TCI's telephone and Internet businesses, and the resulting company became part of AT&T, giving Liberty Media $5.5 billion to repurchase stock or buy other companies. AT&T bought the other TCI businesses—@Home Corp., National Digital Television Center and Western Tele-Communications Inc.—for $2.5 billion in cash. TCI chairman Malone, who became head of the new company, said buyers would not want all of TCI, but they would be interested in Liberty Media. Malone wanted to start a finance unit similar to GE Capital, which could start new cable or Internet services. TCI had already planned digital cable set-top boxes.

On September 28, 1998, Liberty Media announced the formation of Liberty Interactive, a company which would take advantage of new technologies such as set-top boxes to develop interactive programming. The company would own 86% of TCI Music Inc. (NASDAQ symbol: TUNE/TUNEP). In 1999, E! president and CEO Lee Masters became the company's CEO.

On June 2, 1999, Liberty announced that it would acquire the Associated Group for $2.8 billion.

On September 10, 1999, Liberty Media Group renamed TCI Music to Liberty Digital Inc. (NASDAQ symbol: LDIG), with the new company trading on NASDAQ's National Market tier, after Liberty Media traded most of its Internet content, interactive television assets, and rights to provide AT&T's cable systems with interactive services, in addition to cash and notes valued at $150 million, for TCI Music stock. Masters, who became Liberty Digital's CEO, told The Wall Street Journal that the new company had a value of $1 billion, $650 million of that from the interactive unit of Liberty Media, which had also used the name Liberty Digital. Liberty Digital lost $244 million with revenue of $66 million in 1999, thanks to investments in struggling Internet businesses homegrocer.com, drugstore.com, TiVo and iVillage. In August 2000, the company bought a 50% stake in the Sony Pictures-owned Game Show Network because of its interactive features.

Another new company, Liberty Livewire, was formed in 2000 to hold the companies recently acquired by Liberty Media: Todd-AO (cost $92.5 million), Soundelux (cost $70.3 million) and Four Media (cost $263 million), which all provided post-production services. David Beddow of TCI became CEO.

=== 2000–present ===
Liberty Media's Discovery Channel and QVC continued to do well, but the newer projects had problems and the company's stock price dropped by half. If AT&T agreed to spin off Liberty Media, new deals such as a possible News Corp. purchase of DirecTV would be easier because AT&T would no longer require federal approval to complete such deals. Liberty Media was spun off from AT&T on August 10, 2001. This was one of three possible actions to ensure federal approval of AT&T's $54 billion acquisition of MediaOne Group—the others were selling its 25.5% share of Time Warner Entertainment and dropping 11.8 million cable customers. Also in 2001, Liberty Media acquired the remainder of Liberty Digital and Liberty Satellite & Technology (formerly TCI Satellite). Both companies were independent spinoffs of TCI, though Liberty already owned 90% of both companies after the exchange for Sprint PCS stock. Being independent increased their asset values, but the stock prices of both dropped, negating any benefits.

In June 2002, Liberty Media acquired Wink Communications, a maker of set-top boxes founded by Brian P. Dougherty (of GEOS fame), for $100 million. Liberty Media subsequently spent $5 billion on nine German regional cable networks. Apart from television distribution it held major interests in other groups. For example, it was the largest shareholder in News Corporation (though the founding Murdoch family owns more voting shares), and had a 4% stake in Time Warner. In June 2005, Liberty Media International combined with UnitedGlobalCom, creating Liberty Global. In July 2005, the Discovery networks were spun off as Discovery Holding Company. In May 2006, Time Warner acquired Liberty Media's 50% stake in Court TV, for $735 million. On May 16, 2006, IDT sold its IDT Entertainment division to Liberty Media "for all of Liberty Media's interests in IDT, $186 million in cash and the assumption of existing indebtedness". IDT Entertainment's assets and Starz Entertainment Group's line of premium television channels combined to produce content for all distribution platforms, and IDT Entertainment was later renamed as Starz Media.

Liberty negotiated an asset swap with News Corp. and Time Warner that would give it control of DirecTV and the Atlanta Braves baseball team. On February 12, 2007, a deal was completed with Time Warner, wherein Liberty would receive the Atlanta Braves and a group of craft magazines, along with $1 billion in cash, in exchange for 60 million shares of Time Warner stock (valued at $1.27 billion as of market close on February 12, 2007). The deal was approved by Major League Baseball and then completed on May 16, 2007. On February 20, 2008, the Federal Communications Commission approved the exchange of 16.3% of News Corp. for 38.4% of DirecTV, an $11 billion deal that also gave Liberty sports networks in Denver, Pittsburgh and Seattle plus $550 million in cash.

In April 2007, Liberty completed a purchase of Green Bay, Wisconsin, television station WFRV-TV, and satellite station WJMN-TV in Escanaba, Michigan, which serves the Marquette, Michigan, market. The deal was part of a swap of 7.59 million shares of common stock in CBS, the stations' owner, that was held by Liberty Media; in exchange for the stock, CBS gave Liberty the stations and $170 million in cash. Liberty announced plans in April 2011 to sell WFRV and WJMN to Nexstar Broadcasting Group for $20 million.

On September 3, 2008, Liberty Media decided to initiate the process of spinning off Liberty Entertainment to Liberty Media shareholders, leaving Malone with a majority ownership of the new company. On May 4, 2009, The DirecTV Group Inc. said it would become a part of Liberty's entertainment unit, part of which would then be spun off as a separate company called DirecTV. The new company would also acquire Liberty's 100% interests in the three FSN networks and its 50% interest in GSN. The rest of the unit would be traded as Liberty Starz. Liberty would increase its share of DirecTV from 48 to 54%, with Malone and his family owning 24%. On May 4, 2009, Liberty announced that it would split off Liberty Entertainment, Inc., a subsidiary owning the three Fox Sports Net (FSN) channels (now Root Sports) acquired under the swap with News Corp. and Liberty's 65% interest in GSN, into a separate company that would merge with The DirecTV Group, reducing Liberty owner John Malone's stake in DirecTV to 24%. The merger was completed on November 19, 2009, with The DirecTV Group and Liberty Entertainment becoming subsidiaries of a new company named DirecTV.

On February 17, 2009, Liberty announced that it would invest up to $530 million into the struggling Sirius XM Radio Inc., in a structured deal that would help the satellite radio provider avoid filing bankruptcy protection by meeting its obligations. The deal provided two board seats for Liberty Media, and provided cash for operations and development, with a maturity date of December 2012 for the loan. On March 6, the two companies approved the second part of the deal, with Sirius XM getting $250 million immediately and Liberty receiving 12.5 million shares of preferred stock convertible into a 40% ownership of Sirius XM common stock. On June 16, 2010, Malone exchanged his preferred stock in DirecTV with equivalent amounts of common stock, reducing his voting interest in the company from 24% to 3%, with Malone resigning as chairman and ending his managerial role at DirecTV. That same year, Liberty Media announced that it would spin off Liberty Starz and Liberty Capital and keep Liberty Interactive. The spinoff took the name Liberty CapStarz, but renamed itself Liberty Media in 2011. On the Fortune 500 list 2011, Liberty Media was ranked 224, moving up from 2010 when they were ranked 227.

In May 2011, Liberty announced it was in talks to buy the Barnes & Noble bookstore chain for $1.02 billion. It eventually bought a 16% stake in the form of preferred stock in Barnes & Noble for $204 million. On August 8, 2012, Liberty Media announced that it would spin off Starz into a separate publicly traded company. The spin-off of Starz Inc. was completed on January 15, 2013. The company agreed in March 2013 to pay $2.62 billion for 27.3% of Charter Communications from Apollo Global Management, Oaktree Capital Management and Crestview Partners with the provision that Liberty would not increase its stake past 35% until after January 2016 but no more than 39.99%. By May 1, Liberty completed the transaction and placed four directors on Charter's board.

In 2014, Liberty Media spun off TruePosition and its holdings in Charter Communications into a new company, Liberty Broadband. In late 2016, Liberty Media agreed to buy the Formula One Group for US$4.4 billion (£3.3 billion). The deal was finalized in January 2017 for a total of US$4.6 billion (£3.44 billion).

On November 17, 2022, Liberty Media announced that it would split off the Atlanta Braves and its associated real estate development project, and create a new Liberty Live Group tracking stock to hold Liberty's 35% stake in Live Nation. Liberty Media acquired ticket distributor and hospitality group QuintEvents for $313 million in September 2023.

In December 2023, Liberty Media and SiriusXM agreed to create a new public company, "New SiriusXM", although it would continue to operate under the name and brand SiriusXM. The move was intended to created a simplified ownership structure and greater strategic flexibility. The spin-off was completed on September 9, 2024.

On 1 April 2024, Liberty Media announced its planned acquisition of 84% of Dorna Sports, which own MotoGP and WSBK.

On June 23, 2025, Liberty Media was given the go ahead by the European Commission to acquire Dorna Sports. The deal, completed on July 3, 2025, made Dorna a part of the Formula One Group.

On December 15, 2025 Liberty Media completed the split-off of its Liberty Live Group into a separate publicly traded company, Liberty Live Holdings. Its assets included QuintEvents, the stake in Live Nation Entertainment, and some other minority interests.

== Assets ==
=== Current assets ===
- Formula One Group
- MotoGP Sports Entertainment Group (84%)
- F1 Arcade (24%)
- Griffin Gaming Fund (3%)
- Kroenke Arena Company (7%)
- LV Diamond Property I
- Overtime Sports (7%)

=== Former assets ===
- Atlanta Braves
- Court TV (now TruTV) — this was a 50% stake with Time Warner (now WBD) which bought the other 50% of Court TV on May 12, 2006, for $735 million.
- Two CBS affiliates — WFRV-TV (Channel 5), in Green Bay, Wisconsin, and its semi-satellite, WJMN-TV (Channel 3), in Escanaba, Michigan, (under "WFRV and WJMN Television Station, Inc.") (Sold to Nexstar Broadcasting Group)
- DirecTV Sports Networks: Owners of FSN Pittsburgh, FSN Rocky Mountain/FSN Utah, and FSN Northwest (now AT&T SportsNet)
- Liberty's 48% interest in DirecTV
- Liberty's 50% interest in GSN (Game Show Network)
- FUN Technologies, including Fanball
- Overture Films
- Starz Entertainment (including Starz and Encore)—(75%); The Weinstein Company, (25%) Spun off as Starz Inc. on January 15, 2013. Acquired by Lionsgate on December 8, 2016, but split eight/nine years later.
- Sportsnet (formerly CTV Sportsnet) (20%)—now wholly owned by Canada-based Rogers Media.
- MacNeil/Lehrer Productions (67%) — sold to WETA-TV (DC PBS).
- TruePosition, a company providing law enforcement and security agencies with position data.
- Liberty's 35% interest on BET with Robert Johnson, sold to Viacom (now Paramount Skydance) in 2001, along with Johnson.
- Liberty's 35% interest on Telemundo with Sony Pictures, sold to NBC in 2001.
- SiriusXM (83%) - spun-off in 2024.
- Live Nation Entertainment (30%)
- QuintEvents
- Meyer Shank Racing (30%)
- Associated Partners (33%)
- INRIX (4%)
- Liberty Technology Venture Capital (80%)

== Liberty companies ==
Liberty Media has repeatedly utilized tracking stocks and tax-free Section 355 spin-offs to separate distinct businesses and reduce the conglomerate discount, or to provide shareholders with direct stakes in its investments. This strategy has created a network of independent, publicly traded companies that trace their corporate lineage to Liberty Media and remain intertwined, sharing management and resources. They refer to themselves as the "Liberty family of companies".

The following is a list of companies created by Liberty Media through spin-offs, including their further reorganizations.

- Liberty Media International/Liberty Global (2004)
  - Liberty Latin America (2018)
  - Sunrise (2024)
- Discovery Holding Company (2005) – merged into Discovery (2008) which subsequently acquired WarnerMedia to form Warner Bros. Discovery (2022)
  - Ascent Media (2008) – merged into Monitronics (2019)
- DirecTV (2009) – acquired by AT&T (2015)
- Liberty Interactive/QVC Group (2011) – underwent Chapter 11 bankruptcy restructuring in 2026
  - Liberty TripAdvisor Holdings (2014) – merged into Tripadvisor (2025)
  - CommerceHub (2016) – acquired by GTCR and Sycamore Partners (2018)
  - Liberty Expedia Holdings (2016) – merged into Expedia Group (2019)
  - GCI Liberty (2018) – merged into Liberty Broadband (2020)
- Starz (2013) – acquired by Lionsgate (2016) which subsequently spun-off Lionsgate Studios (2025) and renamed itself Starz Entertainment
- Liberty Broadband (2014) – merged into Charter Communications (2026)
  - Liberty Capital (2025)
- Atlanta Braves (2023)
- SiriusXM (2024)
- Liberty Live Holdings (2025)

== Controversies ==
Liberty Media has come under pressure from People for the Ethical Treatment of Animals (PETA), thanks to GCI company, an Alaska-based subsidiary of Liberty Broadband. GCI is a corporate sponsor of the Iditarod, an Alaskan dogsledding race that has lost multiple participants and sponsorships over the years. More than a dozen companies, including ExxonMobil, Alaska Airlines, and Chrysler, have dropped their Iditarod sponsorships over the years, amidst campaign efforts from PETA showing the conditions endured by dogs during and between races. Animal advocates have made pleas to Liberty Media CEO Greg Maffei to end GCI's Iditarod sponsorship. Maffei has not released a statement on GCI's sponsorship. According to PETA, more than 150 dogs have died while running the Iditarod, and that number does not include dogs they say are killed during the off-season because they aren't fast or fit enough.

== See also ==
- List of Colorado companies
