= R. R. Bennett =

R. R. Bennett may refer to:

- Richard Rodney Bennett (1936–2012), English composer and pianist
- Robert R. Bennett (born 1958), American businessman
- Robert Russell Bennett (1894–1981), American composer and arranger
