= Buddy Carlyle =

American baseball player (born 1977)

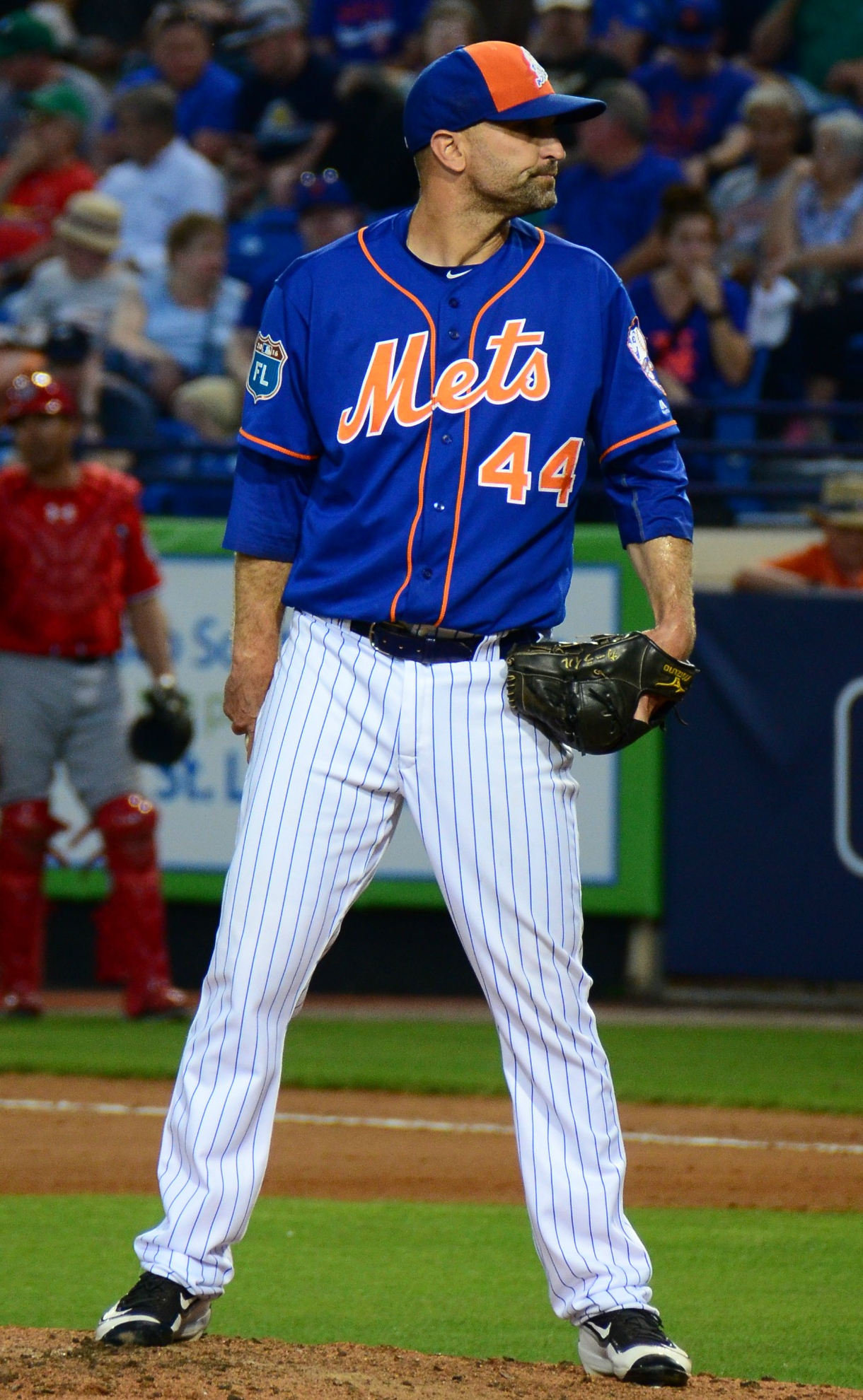
- Carlyle with the New York Mets in 2016
- Pitcher
- Born: December 21, 1977 (age 48); Omaha, Nebraska, U.S.
- Batted: Left Threw: Right

Professional debut
- MLB: August 29, 1999, for the San Diego Padres
- NPB: April 6, 2001, for the Hanshin Tigers
- KBO: May 28, 2006, for the LG Twins

Last appearance
- MLB: May 11, 2015, for the New York Mets
- NPB: August 25, 2010, for the Hokkaido Nippon-Ham Fighters
- KBO: September 28, 2006, for the LG Twins

MLB statistics
- Win–loss record: 13–13
- Earned run average: 5.14
- Strikeouts: 232

KBO statistics
- Win–loss record: 2-6
- Earned run average: 3.25
- Strikeouts: 48

NPB statistics
- Win–loss record: 7-15
- Earned run average: 4.28
- Strikeouts: 138
- Stats at Baseball Reference

Teams
- San Diego Padres (1999–2000); Hanshin Tigers (2001–2002); Los Angeles Dodgers (2005); LG Twins (2006); Atlanta Braves (2007–2009); Hokkaido Nippon-Ham Fighters (2010); New York Yankees (2011); New York Mets (2014–2015)

Earl Lester "Buddy" Carlyle (born December 21, 1977) is an American former professional baseball pitcher and current coach. He played in Major League Baseball (MLB) for the San Diego Padres, Los Angeles Dodgers, Atlanta Braves, New York Yankees, and New York Mets. He also played for in the KBO League for the LG Twins, and in Nippon Professional Baseball (NPB) for the Hanshin Tigers and Hokkaido Nippon-Ham Fighters.

== Early years ==
Born in Omaha, Nebraska, Carlyle attended Bellevue East High School in Bellevue. In addition to baseball, he also lettered in basketball for the Chieftains and graduated in 1996.

== Professional career ==
=== Cincinnati Reds and San Diego Padres ===
Originally selected by the Cincinnati Reds in the second round of the 1996 Major League Baseball draft, Carlyle spent two years in the Reds organization before being traded to the San Diego Padres for Marc Kroon on April 8, 1998. He played for the Mobile BayBears and Las Vegas Stars before making his major league debut on August 29, 1999. In his first year, he appeared in seven games, recording a 1–3 record and a 5.97 ERA while striking out 17 batters.

=== Hanshin Tigers ===
On November 3, 2000, the Padres sold Carlyle's contract to the Hanshin Tigers of Japan's Nippon Professional Baseball. In two seasons with Hanshin, Carlyle went 7–12 with a 4.29 ERA and 124 strikeouts.

=== Kansas City Royals ===
He was picked up by the Kansas City Royals as a free agent after the 2002 season. He split the 2003 season between the Double-A Wichita Wranglers and Triple-A Omaha Royals.

=== New York Yankees ===
He was granted free agency after the season and signed with the New York Yankees on December 23. Playing for Double-A Trenton and Triple-A Columbus, Carlyle compiled a 12–5 record with a 3.19 ERA and 140 strikeouts in 27 games played.

=== Los Angeles Dodgers ===
The Los Angeles Dodgers signed Carlyle for the 2005 season, and invited him to spring training. He began the season on the Dodgers roster, making his first big league appearance since 2000 on April 6. However, he was sent back down to the minors on May 6 and was briefly recalled at the end of May. An appendectomy in June derailed his comeback attempt, shelving him until the end of July, and he spent the rest of the season rehabbing in the minor leagues.

=== Florida Marlins ===
The Florida Marlins signed him on November 10, 2005. Carlyle began 2006 with the Triple-A Albuquerque Isotopes, going 1–3 with a 1.93 ERA and 22 strikeouts in 13 games. He pitched well in April of that year, winning two games and losing none. He won his third game of the season on May 14, but, 4 days later on May 18, he was sold to the LG Twins in Seoul, Korea.

=== Atlanta Braves ===
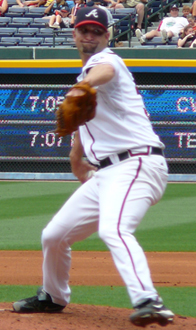
Carlyle pitching for the Atlanta Braves in 2007

On December 14, 2006, the Atlanta Braves invited Carlyle to spring training. He was reassigned to minor league camp on March 30, 2007, but after going 5–2 with a 2.59 ERA and 56 strikeouts in nine games for the Richmond Braves, he was called up to the big leagues on May 25. Carlyle made his Braves debut on May 26, 2007, in a game against the Philadelphia Phillies, a game in which he went four innings, surrendering five earned runs on six hits and allowing two walks. It was his first start in the major leagues since 1999. Carlyle earned his first win of the season and his first since 1999 on June 5, surrendering one hit, a solo home run to Aaron Boone of the Florida Marlins, while going seven innings.

On July 6, 2007, against the Padres, Carlyle tied his career-high with seven strikeouts, set a new career-high with eight innings pitched, and collected his first major league RBI which gave the Braves a 3–2 lead they would not relinquish. In the fourth inning of that game, Carlyle threw an immaculate inning by striking out the side on nine total pitches; it was the 40th time in major-league history that the feat had been accomplished. Reflecting on Carlyle's performance, then Braves manager Bobby Cox noted that "[Carlyle's] sneaky quick. A lot of guys don't have good hacks at him. He gets it by them." He finished his best season with an 8–7 record and a 5.21 ERA.

Carlyle started the 2008 season for the Triple-A Richmond Braves, but was promoted to Atlanta on April 15 with an injury to Peter Moylan. Carlyle ended the season with an ERA of 3.59 with 59 strikeouts in 45 games.

On October 9, 2009, Carlyle was outrighted to the Gwinnett Braves and he elected free agency.

=== Hokkaido Nippon-Ham Fighters ===
Carlyle pitched with the Hokkaido Nippon-Ham Fighters of Nippon Professional Baseball in 2010. Carlyle went 0–3 with a 4.88 ERA over 27.2 innings.

=== New York Yankees (second stint) ===
On December 2, 2010, Carlyle signed a minor league contract with an invitation to spring training with the New York Yankees. He was promoted to the majors on April 22, 2011. Carlyle was designated for assignment on June 29, after pitching 7 2/3 innings for New York, recording a 4.70 ERA. He cleared waivers and was sent outright to the Triple-A Scranton/Wilkes Barre Yankees on July 5. On August 18, Carlyle was released by the Yankees to make room for Raúl Valdés on Triple-A Scranton/Wiles Barre's roster.

=== Atlanta Braves (second stint) ===
Before the 2012 season, Carlyle signed a minor league contract with the Atlanta Braves.

=== Toronto Blue Jays ===
On December 11, 2012, the Toronto Blue Jays announced that Carlyle had been signed to a minor league contract. Carlyle started the 2013 season with the Triple-A Buffalo Bisons.

=== New York Mets ===
On February 18, 2014, Carlyle signed a minor league contract with the New York Mets organization. He was called up to the Mets on May 31, and that same day pitched three innings against the Philadelphia Phillies in an extra-innings game, earning the win. Carlyle was designated for assignment on June 4. He cleared waivers and was sent outright to the Triple-A Las Vegas 51s on June 12. Carlyle was called back up on July 6, as Jon Niese was placed on the disabled list. When Niese returned on July 20, Carlyle was again designated for assignment. He was called up a third time on July 26. Carlyle finished the season 1-1, with a 1.45 ERA in 27 games. On October 31, he was removed from the 40-man roster and sent outright to Las Vegas; Carlyle subsequently rejected the assignment and elected free agency.

Carlyle agreed to another one-year minor league contract with New York on January 5, 2015. Carlyle was placed on the disabled list with back and hamstring tightness on May 14. However, his season ended on July 12, when he got surgery to repair a labrum muscle in his hip. Carlyle finished the season 1–0, with a 5.63 ERA, 1.13 WHIP, six strikeouts, one walk, and one save in 11 games.

Carlyle once again re-signed with the Mets on a minor league contract on December 14, 2015. He was released prior to the start of the season on March 25, 2016.

== Coaching career ==
=== Atlanta Braves ===
The Atlanta Braves hired Carlyle in May of 2016 to serve as a coaching assistant responsible for managing instant replay review.

=== Los Angeles Angels ===
In November 2016, Carlyle was hired by the Los Angeles Angels to serve as the pitching coach for their Double–A affiliate, the Mobile BayBears. After one year in the role, he would serve as the assistant minor league pitching coordinator, and later the primary pitching coordinator. Following the 2023 season, Carlyle was let go by the Angels organization following Troy Percival's criticism of the use of iPads in player development.

=== Tampa Bay Rays ===
On November 16, 2023, Carlyle was hired by the Tampa Bay Rays to hold his previous of minor league pitching coordinator.

== Personal life ==
Carlyle was diagnosed with diabetes in 2009, and does multi-doses with an insulin pen.
