= José Ascanio =

Venezuelan baseball player (born 1985)

- Pitcher
- Born: May 2, 1985 (age 41); Maracay, Aragua, Venezuela
- Batted: Right Threw: Right

MLB debut
- July 13, 2007, for the Atlanta Braves

Last MLB appearance
- June 5, 2011, for the Pittsburgh Pirates

MLB statistics
- Win–loss record: 1–3
- Earned run average: 5.28
- Strikeouts: 41
- Stats at Baseball Reference

Teams
- Atlanta Braves (2007); Chicago Cubs (2008–2009); Pittsburgh Pirates (2009, 2011)

José Eleazar Ascanio (born May 2, 1985) is a Venezuelan former professional baseball pitcher. He played in Major League Baseball (MLB) for the Atlanta Braves, Chicago Cubs, and Pittsburgh Pirates.

== Career ==
=== Atlanta Braves ===
Ascanio was signed as an undrafted free agent in 2001 by Atlanta. He began his professional career with the Gulf Coast League Braves, where he went 4–1 with a 1.37 ERA and 17 strikeouts at age 18. The next year, with the Rome Braves, he went 3–3, with a 3.84 ERA and 64 strikeouts, as well as a career-high 9 saves, in 34 games.

In 2005, he played in 5 games for the Myrtle Beach Pelicans, recording 3 wins, 1 loss, a 6.10 ERA, and a career-low 12 K, before being sidelined with a fractured back injury.

On July 13, 2007, Ascanio was called up by the Braves after Wilfredo Ledezma had trouble getting back to the U.S. after going home to Venezuela during the All-Star break. Ascanio made his debut the same day, pitching the ninth inning of a 9–1 win. Ascanio allowed one run on three hits in his first Major League appearance, striking out two in the process. He was sent down on July 31 and called up again on August 24. He earned his first Major League win on September 14 pitching the last two innings of a 13-inning game. He finished the season 1–1 with a 5.06 ERA.

=== Chicago Cubs ===
On December 4, 2007, Ascanio was traded to the Chicago Cubs in exchange for reliever Will Ohman and infielder Omar Infante.

On May 10, 2009, Ascanio was called up by the Cubs from Triple-A Iowa after possessing a 1.01 ERA in 26 2/3 innings pitched as a starter. He was expected to start in the back of the bullpen. He appeared in 14 games for the Cubs, with a 3.52 ERA.

=== Pittsburgh Pirates ===
On July 30, 2009, Ascanio was traded to the Pittsburgh Pirates with Kevin Hart and Josh Harrison in exchange for John Grabow and Tom Gorzelanny. He appeared in 2 games for the Pirates in 2009 and another 8 in 2011, with a 7.00 ERA. He spent all of 2010 and much of 2011 on the disabled list due to shoulder surgery performed on him late in the 2009 season.

The Pirates designated him for assignment on June 7, 2011.

=== Los Angeles Dodgers ===
Ascanio was signed by the Los Angeles Dodgers to a minor league contract on December 13, 2011. He also received an invitation to spring training. Ascanio failed his physical when he reported for spring training and had his contract voided by the Dodgers.

=== Mexican League ===
Ascanio was assigned to the Diablos Rojos del México in 2013, and was later signed by the Petroleros de Minatitlán. In 2014, he started the season with the Toros de Tijuana and later was assigned to the Acereros de Monclova where he finished the year. He signed with the Guerreros de Oaxaca for the 2015 season, and spent the 2016 and 2017 seasons out of the league. On January 8, 2018, it was announced that Ascanio would return to the Mexican League with the Tecolotes de los Dos Laredos. He was released on April 3, 2018.

=== San Marino ===
Ascanio pitched in twelve games for San Marino of the Italian Baseball League in 2017. He posted a 4.61 ERA and recorded two saves.

After the 2019 season, Ascanio played for Caribes de Anzoátegui of the Liga Venezolana de Béisbol Profesional (LVMP). He has also played for Venezuela in the 2020 Caribbean Series.

After the 2020 season, Ascanio played for Caribes of the LVMP. He has also played for Venezuela in the 2021 Caribbean Series.

=== Caciques de Distrito ===
In July 2025, Ascanio signed with the Caciques de Distrito of the Venezuelan Major League.

== Personal life ==
Ascanio has two children, Jordan and Santiago.

== See also ==
- List of Major League Baseball players from Venezuela
