= Discovery Holding Company =

American media company

- Type: Public
- Traded as: Nasdaq: DISCA; Nasdaq: DISCB
- Industry: Broadcasting & Cable TV
- Predecessor: Liberty Media
- Founded: 2005; 21 years ago
- Defunct: September 18, 2008; 18 years ago
- Fate: Merged operations with Discovery Communications, LLC and Advance/Newhouse Communications
- Successor: Discovery Communications (later Skydance)
- Headquarters: Principal executive offices located at Meridian, Colorado
- Key people: John C. Malone (CEO & chairman); Robert R. Bennett (president and Director)
- Products: Holding Company focused on media
- Revenue: ▼US$6,497 million
- Number of employees: 3,800, essentially all with subsidiaries
- Website: discoveryholding.com (archived)

Discovery Holding Company was an American company headquartered in Meridian, Colorado. The postal designation of nearby Englewood was commonly listed as the company's location in corporate filings and news accounts.

The company used to hold a 66-2/3% ownership stake in Discovery Communications, LLC, and operated Ascent Media and AccentHealth, LLC. On September 17, 2008, Discovery Holdings divested its interest in Ascent Media, and reorganized its remaining businesses around a new publicly traded holding company, Discovery Communications, Inc.

== Corporate governance ==
Members of the board of directors of Discovery Holding included: John C. Malone and Robert R. Bennett. Former CEO John C. Malone is also the chairman of Liberty Media Corporation from which Discovery Holding Company was spun off in 2005.

== Financials ==
Source: SEC filings

- Cash and cash equivalents at March 31, 2007: $150M USD
- Total shareholders’ equity at March 31, 2007: $4,570M USD
- Revenue for 2006: $688M USD
- Net earnings for 2006: -$28M USD

== Holdings ==
Discovery Holding owned the following subsidiary companies until the corporate restructuring completed on September 17, 2008.

- Ascent Media
- 66-2/3% of Discovery Communications, LLC.

== Spin-off and restructuring ==
On December 13, 2007, Discovery Holdings announced a restructuring plan with that being completed on September 17, 2008, with Discovery Holding's Ascent Media business being spun off, and the remaining businesses, Discovery Communications, LLC and Advance/Newhouse Communications, were combined into a new holding company, Discovery Communications, Inc, with the new fully public company and trading on the NASDAQ stock market under the symbols DISCA, DISCB, and DISCK, with the SEC filings being submitted by the Discovery Holding Company.
