= Protect America =

American home security company

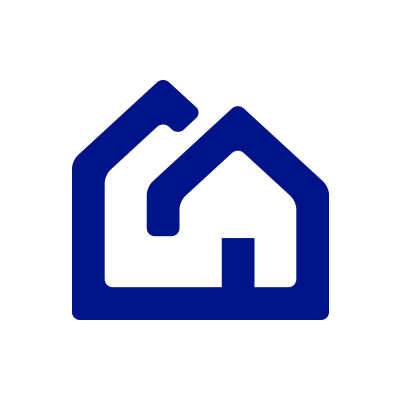
- Type: Private
- Industry: Home security
- Founded: 1992 in Austin, Texas
- Defunct: 2020
- Fate: Acquired by Monitronics
- Successor: Brinks Home Security (2020)
- Headquarters: Austin, Texas
- Area served: United States; Canada
- Key people: Scott Fleming (CEO); Janet Laird (COO); Jared Miller (CFO); Blain Vasek (CTO); Brian Carter (VP); Steve Jones (VP); Ryan Pombrio (VP); Rylan Francis (VP); Aaron Wells (VP)
- Website: protectamerica.com

Protect America was a home security company based in Austin, Texas.

== Company history ==
The company was founded in 1992 by Thad Paschall in Austin, Texas—where it was headquartered. By 2001, the company had installed about 200,000 security systems. In 2010 the company was purchased by Rockbridge Growth Equity LLC from Falcon Investments under advisement from Imperial Capital. The total cost of the company was about $100 million. The company was ranked among SDM Magazine’s top 15 U.S. security system providers as of 2014. In 2012 Protect America expanded into Canada, and had about 400,000 customers. In 2013 the company had 390 employees, adding 67 jobs that year, the 13th most that year in the state of Texas according to Inc. Magazine. Protect America also provides public security system advice on US television networks. In 2020, Protect America was acquired by Brinks Home Security.

== Security systems ==
In 2005, the company produced the first monitored self-installed security system business model. The company also offered mobile apps that allowed customers to interact with their home security systems while away from their residences, called the SMART connect app. Security packages were offered at different pricing, in both hardline and cellular models.

== Philanthropy ==
Protect America has teamed with universities such as Michigan State University and the University of South Alabama to help students provide aid to local area charities. It has also partnered directly with the Austin Police Department, providing financing for police initiatives, including the updating of their security equipment.
