= Robert R. Bennett =

American businessperson

Robert R. Bennett (born 1958) is an American businessman who was the president and director of the Discovery Holding Company from 2005 to 2008 and president and CEO of Liberty Media from 1997 to 2005.

== Early life ==
Bennett obtained a bachelor's degree from Denison University and an MBA from Columbia Business School.
