= Ascent Capital Group =

Ascent Capital Group, Inc.
- Type: Public
- Traded as: Nasdaq: ASCMA; Nasdaq: ASCMB
- Industry: Residential Security Monitoring
- Founded: 1999; 27 years ago
- Defunct: 2019
- Fate: Merged with Monitronics
- Headquarters: Denver, Colorado, United States
- Area served: United States
- Key people: William R. Fitzgerald (chairman); William E. Niles (CEO)
- Revenue: ▲US$311.9M (FY 2011)
- Operating income: ▲US$-28.2M (FY 2011)
- Net income: ▲US$20.6M (FY 2011)
- Total assets: ▼US$1,626M(FY 2011)
- Total equity: ▲US$560M (FY 2011)
- Website: www.ascentcapitalgroupinc.com

Ascent Capital Group, Inc. was a publicly traded holding company whose primary subsidiary was Monitronics. Ascent Media was a wholly owned subsidiary of the Discovery Holding Company (DHC), who spun off Ascent Media as an independent, public company in September 2008.

The company's main activity through its wholly owned subsidiary, Monitronics, was to provide security alarm monitoring services to more than 1 million residential and commercial customers in the United States, Canada and Puerto Rico through its nationwide network of independent dealers.

Ascent Capital Group ceased its business following its merger with Monitronics in 2019.

== History ==
In its past, Ascent Capital Group provided creative and technical services to the media and entertainment industries. Ascent Media was a wholly owned subsidiary of the Discovery Holding Company (DHC), who spun off Ascent Media as an independent, public company in September 2008.

The assets and operations of Ascent Capital Group were composed primarily of the assets and operations of various businesses acquired from 2000 through 2004, including the Todd-AO Corporation, Four Media Company, Video Services Corporation, Group W Network Services, London Playout Centre and the systems integration business of Sony Electronics. The combination and integration of these and other acquired entities allowed AMG to offer integrated outsourcing for the technical and creative requirements of its clients, from content creation and other post-production services to media management and transmission of the final product to broadcast television stations, cable system head-ends and other destinations and distribution points.

- 1999: Ascent Media was formed through the acquisition of three post-production companies: Todd-AO Corporation, Four Media Company, and certain assets of Soundelux Entertainment Group using Liberty Media stock valued at more than $400 million US dollars.
- 2005: Ascent Media formed a deal with Sony Pictures Entertainment to convert Sony's library of more than 4,000 films and many of its vintage TV shows into digital files.
- 2006: Discovery Holding Company acquired AccentHealth and was overseen by Ascent Media.
- 2007: During the fourth quarter of 2007, the Board of Directors of DHC approved a resolution to spin off the capital stock of AMC to the holders of DHC Series A and Series B common stock. Each owner of Series A common stock had 1 vote per share of voting power and Series B common stock owners had 10 votes per share.
- 2008: On September 4, Ascent Media completed the sale of 100% of the ownership interests in AccentHealth to an unaffiliated third party for net cash proceeds of $118,643,000.
- 2008: The AMC Spin Off was completed on September 17. Following the AMC Spin Off, AMC and DHC operated independently, and neither had any stock ownership, beneficial or otherwise, in the other.
- 2008: Ascent Media Group's Creative Sound Services group spun off from Discovery Holding Company to create CSS Studios, LLC, a wholly owned subsidiary of Discovery Communications. This included the assets of Todd-AO, Soundelux, Sound One, POP Sound, Modern Music, Soundelux Design Music Group and The Hollywood Edge.
- 2010: In December, Ascent Media acquired Monitronics, a home security system company.
- 2011: On February 28, Encompass Digital Media, Inc. purchased Ascent Media's global content distribution business, including facilities in New York metro area, Minnesota, Burbank, London and Singapore. On July 7, Ascent Media Corporation merged with its subsidiary, Ascent Capital Group, Inc., for the purpose of changing its name to Ascent Capital Group, Inc.
- 2012: On October 26, Monitronics acquired approximately 93,000 security alarm monitoring subscriber accounts representing $4.4 million of gross recurring monthly revenue from Pinnacle Security for a purchase price of $131 million.
