= Monitronics =

Security company

Monitronics International, Inc.
- Formerly: MONI Smart Security, SafeMart, LiveWatch
- Company type: Public
- Traded as: OTCQX: SCTY
- Industry: Home security services
- Founded: 1994; 32 years ago
- Headquarters: Dallas, Texas
- Key people: William E. Niles (CEO from March 2020)
- Revenue: ▲$505 Million(2019)
- Number of employees: 1,200
- Website: www.brinkshome.com

Monitronics International, Inc. is an American security company that offers home security systems under the name Brink's Home.

== History ==
Monitronics International was founded in Dallas in 1994 to provide alarm monitoring services to U.S. customers and businesses, as well as financing, technical training and product solutions to dealers within the industry. It was funded mostly by ABRY Partners until it was sold to Ascent Media in December 2010. As of 2015, it was the second largest security alarm monitoring company in the United States, behind ADT.

In 2013, MONI purchased Security Networks, a network of about 225 security dealers, for $507 million to diversify its service offerings and enter into the developing and complementary DIY home service category.

In 2015, Monitronics acquired LiveWatch, a Kansas-based company that sold security alarm and home automation systems for DIY installation. The company was founded in 2002 under the name Safemart by Chris Johnson, a former Kansas paramedic. Initially, SafeMart distributed home security products from third-party manufacturers. In 2010, Johnson hired CEO Brad Morehead. By 2015, the company had grown to have 180 employees and had around 200,000 customers in the United States, and was acquired by Monitronics for $67 million.

In 2016, Monitronics International changed its name to Moni; along with it, its logo and other style elements were changed.

In 2018, Brinks re-entered the home security business through a trademark licensing deal, re-creating the "Brinks Home Security" brand.

The trademark deal was done with Moni, a US private company headquartered in Farmers Branch, Texas that sells home security company systems that can be self-installed or professionally installed.

In February 2018, Moni exclusively licensed its trademarks and businesses to Brinks, which resulted in a rebranding of Moni and LiveWatch as Brinks Home Security.

In 2019, Monitronics filed for Chapter 11 bankruptcy.

In June 2020, Moni acquired Protect America for $15 million in upfront costs.

On May 15, 2023, Monitronics filed for Chapter 11 bankruptcy for the second time in four years.
