= Scott Thorman =

Canadian baseball player & coach (born 1982)

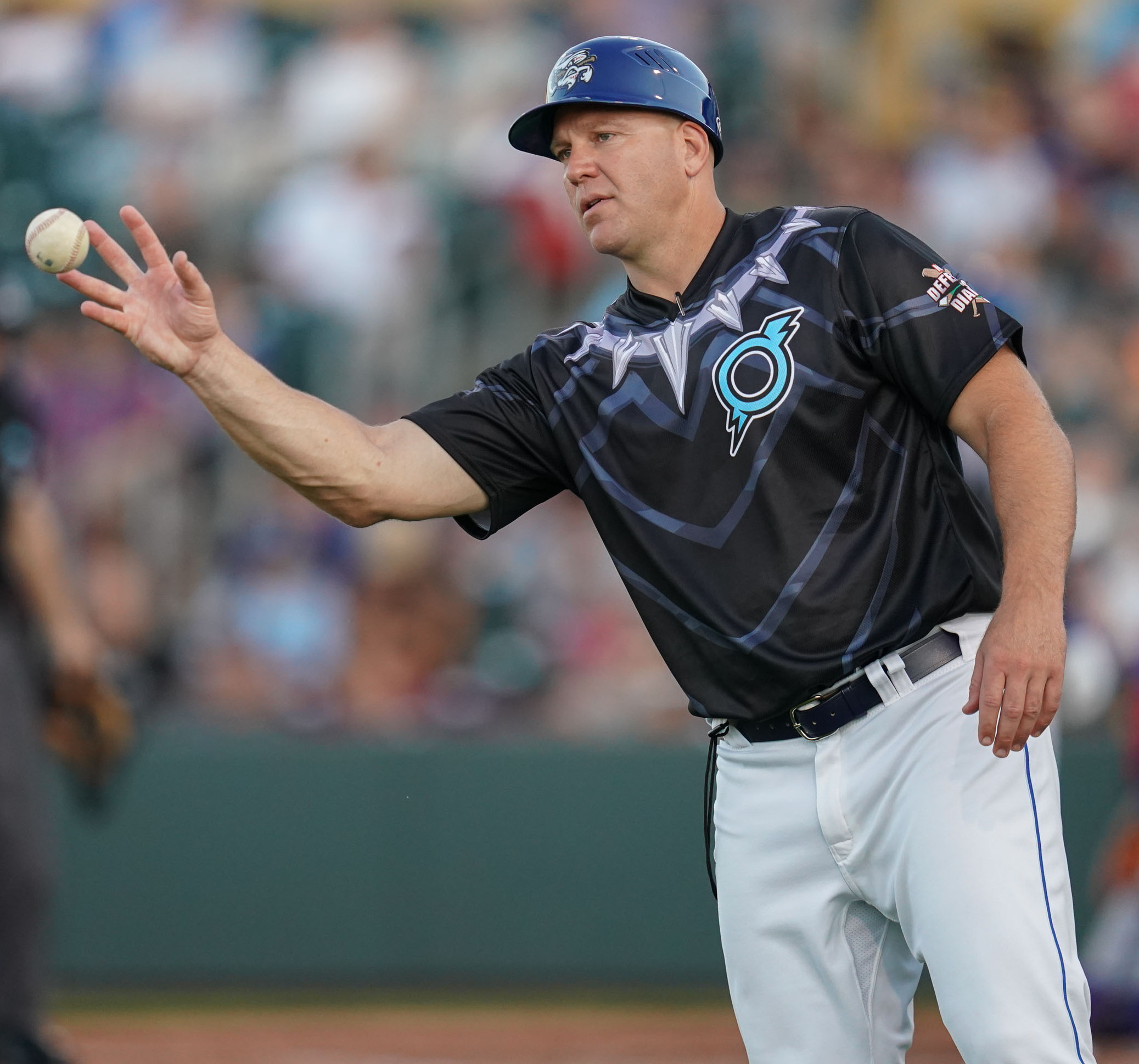
- Thorman with the Omaha Storm Chasers in 2022
- First baseman
- Born: January 6, 1982 (age 44); Cambridge, Ontario, Canada
- Batted: Left Threw: Right

MLB debut
- June 18, 2006, for the Atlanta Braves

Last MLB appearance
- September 30, 2007, for the Atlanta Braves

MLB statistics
- Batting average: .222
- Home runs: 16
- Runs batted in: 50
- Stats at Baseball Reference

Teams
- Atlanta Braves (2006–2007)

Scott Robert Thorman (born January 6, 1982) is a Canadian former first baseman and current coach who is the minor league field coordinator for the Kansas City Royals. In 2022, he was manager of the Omaha Storm Chasers, the Triple-A affiliate of the Royals. He was previously manager of the Northwest Arkansas Naturals, the Royals' Double-A affiliate. Managing the Royals’ former Advanced-A affiliate Wilmington Blue Rocks in 2019, he won the Mills Cup Championship. Thorman was drafted in the first round, 30th overall in the 2000 Major League Baseball draft by the Atlanta Braves. Thorman played for Canada in the inaugural 2006 World Baseball Classic and Thorman also played in the 2009 World Baseball Classic.

== Professional career ==
=== Atlanta Braves ===
Thorman steadily rose through the Braves organization, finishing the 2005 season with their Triple-A team, the Richmond Braves. Thorman made his major league debut on June 18, 2006. Thorman's first major league hit was an RBI single against Scott Downs of the Toronto Blue Jays on June 20, 2006.

Thorman earned his first multi-home run game on May 12, 2007 in a 9–2 win over the Pittsburgh Pirates. On September 22, Thorman hit a pinch-hit game-tying homer with 2 outs in the bottom of the 10th inning against the Milwaukee Brewers. The Braves went on to win the game an inning later.

The Braves sent Thorman outright to the minors on March 28, 2008. Thorman became a free agent at the end of the season.

=== Milwaukee Brewers ===
In December 2008 Thorman was signed to a minor league contract with the Milwaukee Brewers and Thorman received an invitation to Spring training. Thorman was released by the Brewers on April 4, 2009 after the Brewers acquired first baseman Joe Koshansky.

=== Texas Rangers ===
On April 7, 2009, Thorman signed a minor league contract with the Texas Rangers, but was released on April 27. Thorman had hit only .188 with one home run and four RBIs in 11 games with the Triple-A Oklahoma RedHawks before his release.

=== Kansas City Royals ===
Thorman signed a minor league contract with the Kansas City Royals on May 21, 2009. Thorman hit .297 with 19 home runs and 63 RBIs in 97 games with the Triple-A Omaha Royals. On December 11, 2009 Thorman was re-signed by the Royals with an invitation to spring training.

=== Detroit Tigers ===
On December 1, 2010, Thorman signed a minor league contract with the Detroit Tigers and played in 109 games for the Toledo Mud Hens in AAA, hitting .240. He went into coaching not long after.

== Personal life ==
Thorman's father died of cancer when Thorman was 12. Thorman has a wife, Kelly. Thorman also has 3 children.
