= Royce Ring =

American baseball player and coach (born 1980)

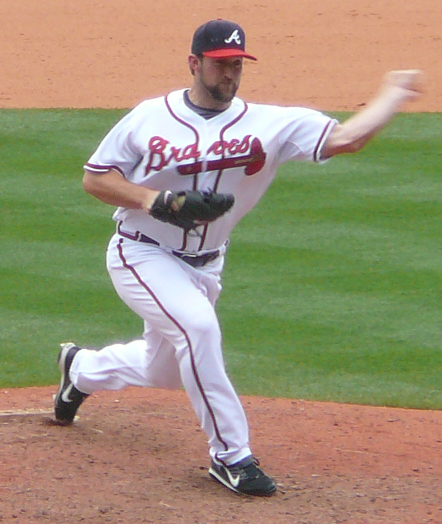
- Ring with the Braves in 2008
- Pitcher
- Born: December 21, 1980 (age 45); La Mesa, California, U.S.
- Batted: Left Threw: Left

MLB debut
- April 29, 2005, for the New York Mets

Last MLB appearance
- October 3, 2010, for the New York Yankees

MLB statistics
- Win–loss record: 3–3
- Earned run average: 5.29
- Strikeouts: 55
- Stats at Baseball Reference

Teams
- New York Mets (2005–2006); San Diego Padres (2007); Atlanta Braves (2007–2008); New York Yankees (2010)

Roger Royce Ring (born December 21, 1980) is an American former professional baseball pitcher and coach. He played in Major League Baseball (MLB) for the New York Mets, San Diego Padres, Atlanta Braves and New York Yankees.

== Amateur career ==
Ring was born in La Mesa, California. He graduated from Monte Vista High School (Spring Valley, California). He was drafted by the Cleveland Indians in the 41st round of the 1999 MLB draft, but did not sign.

He attended San Diego State University, where he became a star closer after dropping 42 pounds in his sophomore year. In 2002, as a junior, Ring went 5-1 with a 1.85 ERA and 17 saves, a mark that stood until Addison Reed recorded 20 in 2009. He was also named a third-team All-American in 2002 and first-team All-Mountain West Conference in 2001 and 2002.

In 2003, Ring was named to the USA Baseball Olympic Qualifying Team ahead of the 2004 Summer Olympics in Athens.

== Professional career ==
=== Chicago White Sox ===
He was selected by the Chicago White Sox as the 18th overall pick in the first round of the 2002 Major League Baseball draft. That year, he pitched to a 3.21 ERA with 31 strikeouts and 11 walks in 24 games between the Arizona League and the High-A Carolina League. In 2003, he pitched for the Birmingham Barons in Double-A, compiling a 2.52 ERA, 19 saves, 44 strikeouts, and 14 walks in 35.2 innings.

=== New York Mets ===
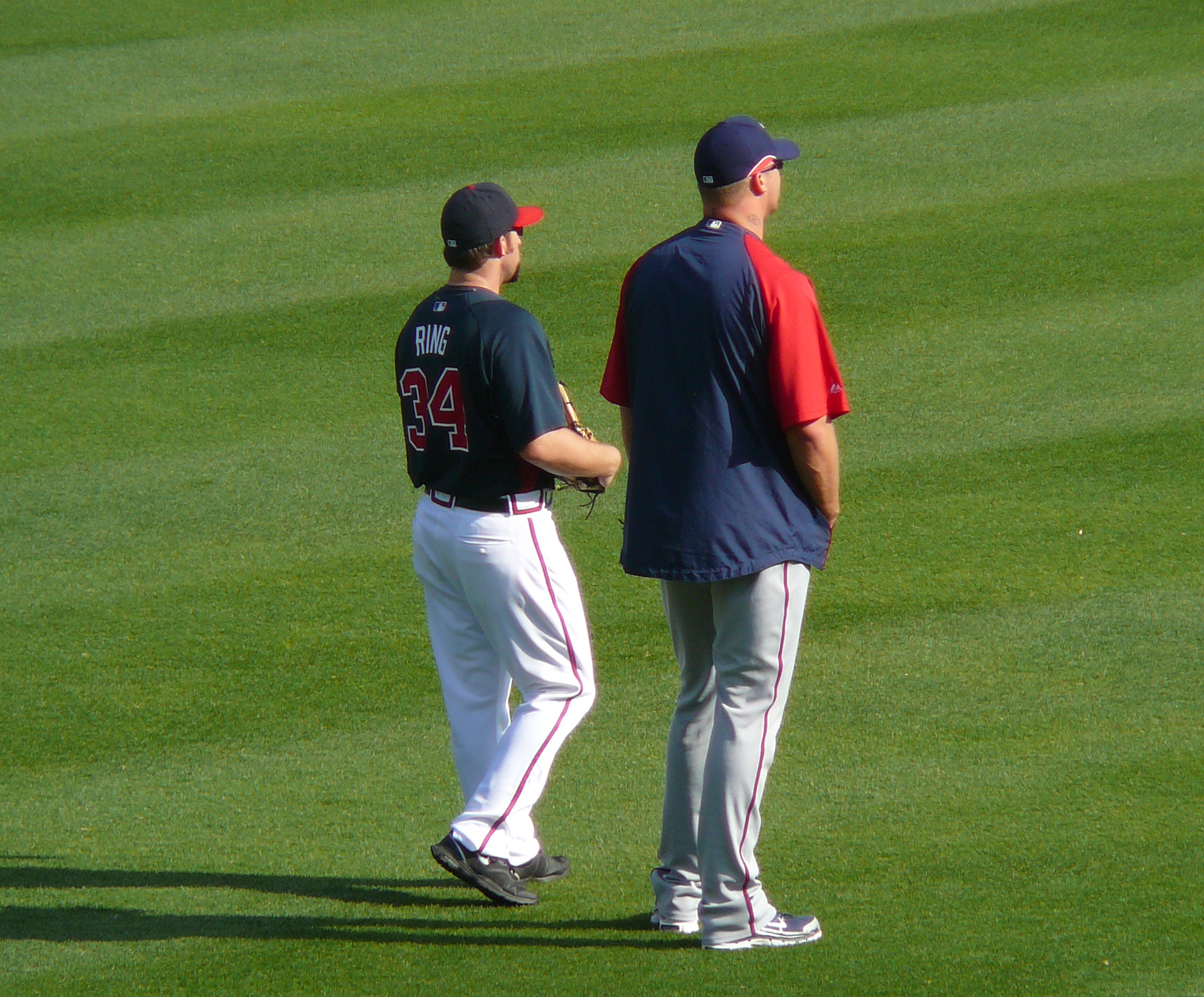
Ring (left) talks with Nationals pitcher Jon Rauch in 2008

In 2003, Ring was acquired by the New York Mets with Edwin Almonte and Andrew Salvo in the trade that sent Roberto Alomar and cash to the White Sox. That year, he participated in the All-Star Futures Game and held a 1.66 ERA in 21.2 innings with the Binghamton Mets.

Ring's performance suffered in the 2004 season, and the Mets made it clear he was no longer considered the team's closer of the future. Instead, he would need to pitch more often and in different situations to be considered for a role in the majors. After posting a 3.63 ERA in 34.2 innings with the Norfolk Tides in Triple-A, he was demoted after the All-Star break. The Mets left him unprotected in the Rule 5 draft that offseason after he gained close to 20 pounds.

However, he lost the excess weight and dropped his arm angle for the 2005 season and saw better results. Back in Triple-A, Ring allowed one run in nine innings and was called up to the big leagues. He made his Major League debut on April 29 against the Washington Nationals. Ring posted a disappointing 5.06 ERA with 10 walks in 10.2 innings for the Mets, but went 3–0 with a 3.26 ERA in 33 games for Triple-A Norfolk.

Fully embracing his role as a situational left, Ring pitched to a 2.97 ERA in 39.1 innings at Triple-A. He was recalled to the big leagues on August 2, 2006. Three weeks later, he was sent back to Norfolk to make room on the 25-man roster for the newly acquired Shawn Green. He later returned to the big league club as a September call up. Ring was included on the team's playoff roster for the 2006 National League Division Series but never entered a game. He was dropped from the roster for the National League Championship Series.

=== San Diego Padres ===
On November 15, 2006, Ring was traded along with Heath Bell to the San Diego Padres for outfielder Ben Johnson and reliever Jon Adkins. After pitching to a 4.91 ERA in seven games that spring, he was cut from major league camp and began the 2007 season in Triple-A. He was first called up to the Padres on April 30 and pitched in 15 games across two stints with the team.

=== Atlanta Braves ===
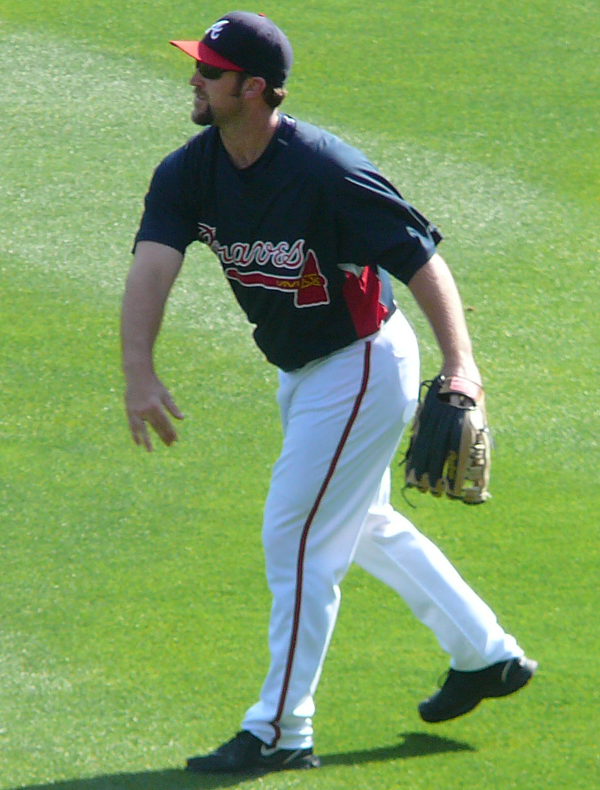
Ring during batting practice with the Braves in 2008

On July 31, 2007, Ring was traded to the Atlanta Braves for Wilfredo Ledezma and pitching prospect Will Startup, then optioned to the Triple-A Richmond Braves. He was called up when the rosters expanded on September 1. In 2008, Ring was included on the Braves opening day roster. After compiling an 8.46 ERA in 22.1 innings, he was designated for assignment on August 2, 2008. He cleared waivers and was assigned to Triple-A Richmond. He became a free agent at the end of the season.

=== St. Louis Cardinals ===
On January 5, 2009, Ring signed a one-year deal with the St. Louis Cardinals. However, he was placed on outright waivers on March 25, and accepted a minor league assignment to Triple-A with the Memphis Redbirds.

=== New York Yankees ===
On January 12, 2010, Ring signed a minor league contract with the New York Yankees, and was invited to spring training. Although he impressed the Yankees in spring training, he was optioned to the Triple-A Scranton/Wilkes-Barre Yankees. Following the completion of the Triple-A season, the Yankees purchased Ring's contract and promoted him to the major leagues. After the season, he was outrighted off the 40-man roster.

=== Seattle Mariners ===
On December 14, 2010, Ring signed a minor league contract with the Seattle Mariners and was invited to spring training. However, he did not make the Mariners out of spring training and was sent to the minors on March 27. He opted out of his contract on July 3 after posting a 6.08 ERA in 27 games.

=== Boston Red Sox ===
Ring signed a minor league contract with the Boston Red Sox on July 20, 2011. Ring pitched in just nine games for Pawtucket.

=== Colorado Rockies ===
Ring signed a minor league deal with the Colorado Rockies on February 22, 2012.

=== Long Island Ducks ===
On May 26, 2013, Ring signed a contract with the Long Island Ducks of the Atlantic League of Professional Baseball.

== Coaching career ==
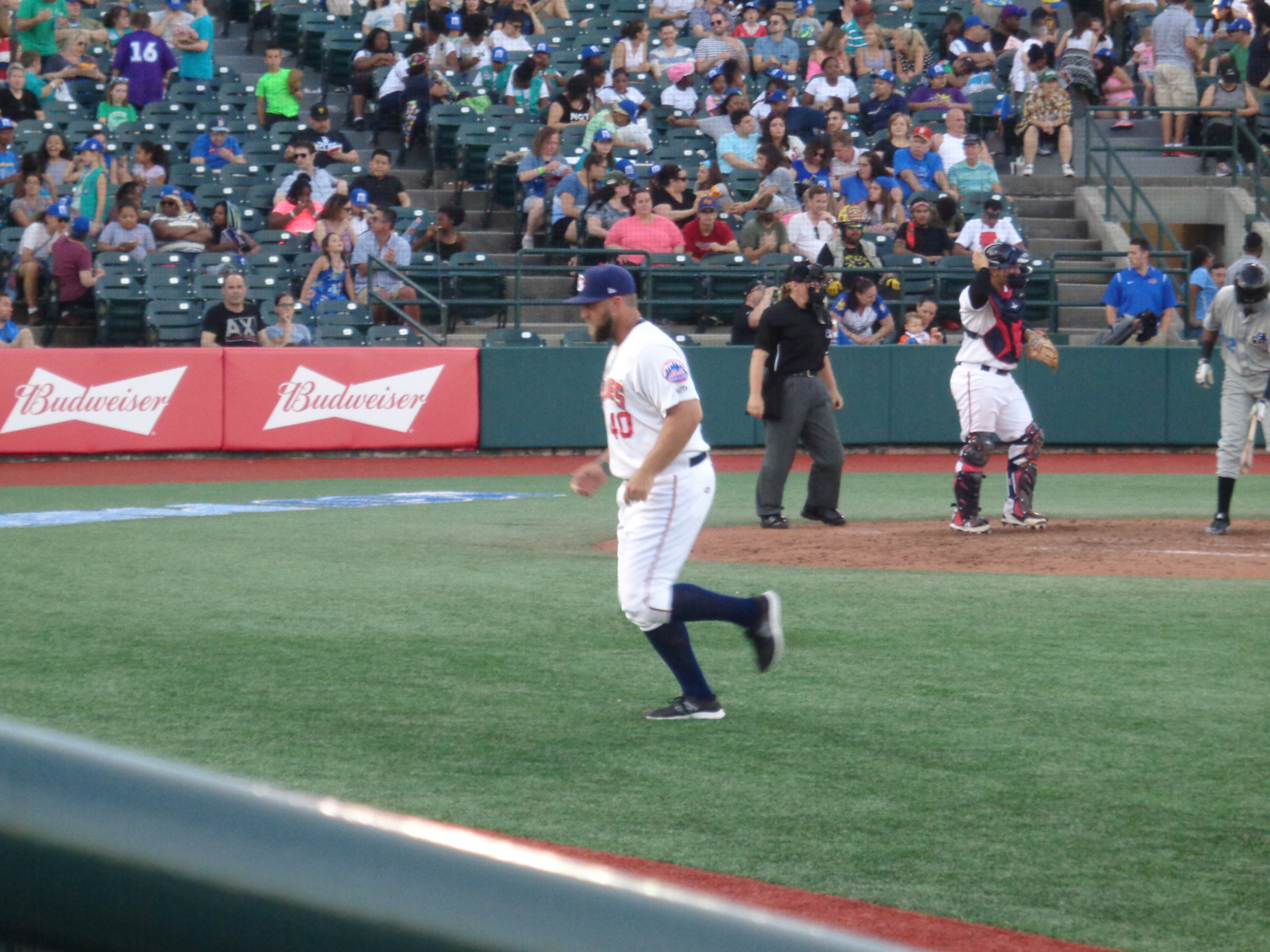
Ring coaching with the Brooklyn Cyclones in 2017

In May 2014 it was announced that Ring was retiring as a player to become the pitching coach for the Gulf Coast Mets, a rookie level minor league team in the New York Mets organization. In 2016, he was named the pitching coach for the Kingsport Mets of the Appalachian League. Ring became the pitching coach for the Short Season A Brooklyn Cyclones in 2017. He was promoted to the Low-A Columbia Fireflies for 2019 and was promoted to the High-A St. Lucie Mets for 2020 before the season was cancelled due to the COVID-19 pandemic. After the MiLB realignment of 2021, Ring was assigned back to the Brooklyn Cyclones, who are now the High-A Affiliate of the New York Mets.

On January 16, 2022, the Lotte Giants of the KBO League hired Ring to serve as the team's pitching coordinator.
