= Brandon Jones (baseball) =

American baseball player (born 1983)

- Left fielder
- Born: December 10, 1983 (age 42); Panama City, Florida, U.S.
- Batted: Left Threw: Right

MLB debut
- September 16, 2007, for the Atlanta Braves

Last MLB appearance
- May 4, 2009, for the Atlanta Braves

MLB statistics
- Batting average: .257
- Home runs: 1
- Runs batted in: 22
- Stats at Baseball Reference

Teams
- Atlanta Braves (2007–2009)

Brandon Lamon Jones (born December 10, 1983) is an American former professional baseball outfielder. He played in Major League Baseball for the Atlanta Braves from 2007 to 2009. Listed at 6-foot-2 and 195 pounds, Jones bats left-handed and throws right-handed.

== Career ==
=== Atlanta Braves ===
Jones was drafted by the Atlanta Braves in the 24th round of the 2003 Major League Baseball draft out of Wewahitchka High School in Wewahitchka, Florida. Entering 2007, he was rated by Baseball America as the number four prospect in the Braves organization. Days after leading the Triple-A Richmond Braves to the 2007 Governors' Cup championship in the International League, Jones made his big league debut on September 16, 2007, going hitless in four at bats. On September 17, Jones collected his first major league RBI. He got his first career base hit on September 28, a double, against the Houston Astros. He returned to Richmond to play in the Triple-A Championship Game, getting one hit in a losing effort. On June 11, 2008, he was recalled by the Braves from Richmond. Jones hit his first major league home run off Los Angeles Angels of Anaheim starter Ervin Santana on June 14. The Braves designated Jones for assignment on January 12, 2010, to open up a roster spot for Eric Hinske.

=== Pittsburgh Pirates ===
On January 19, he was claimed by the Pittsburgh Pirates.

=== Detroit Tigers ===
On August 2, 2010, Jones was traded by the Pirates to the Detroit Tigers for a player to be named later. He was assigned to the Double-A Erie SeaWolves.

=== Milwaukee Brewers ===
On January 4, 2011, Jones signed a minor league contract with the Milwaukee Brewers. He played 68 games for the Double-A Huntsville Stars before being released.

=== Lancaster Barnstormers ===
Jones finished the 2011 season with the Lancaster Barnstormers. In 57 games he hit .268/.350/.361 with 4 home runs, 22 RBIs and 2 stolen bases.

=== Kansas City T-Bones ===
He started the 2012 season with the Kansas City T-Bones of the American Association. In 97 games he hit .326/.393/.524 with 14 home runs, 73 RBIs and 2 stolen bases.

Jones played for Kansas City in the 2013 season as well. In 42 games he struggled immensely hitting .197/.289/.309 with 2 home runs and 14 RBIs.

=== New Jersey Jackals ===
On July 4, 2013, Jones was traded to the New Jersey Jackals of the Can-AM League. In 46 games he hit .263/.335/.343 with 2 home runs, 27 RBIs and 1 stolen base.

=== Sioux Falls Canaries ===
Jones signed with the Sioux Falls Canaries of the American Association for the 2014 season. In 94 games he hit .270/.326/.368 with 6 home runs and 47 RBIs.

=== York Revolution ===
On April 3, 2015, Jones signed with the York Revolution of the Atlantic League of Professional Baseball. He was released on May 20. In 23 games he struggled hitting .218/.322/.333 with 3 home runs, 10 RBIs and 3 stolen bases.

=== Lancaster Barnstormers (second stint) ===
On May 20, 2015, Jones signed with the Lancaster Barnstormers of the Atlantic League of Professional Baseball. In 40 games he hit .257/.311/.329 with 2 home runs, 13 RBIs and 2 stolen bases.

=== Bridgeport Bluefish ===
On July 11, 2015, Jones was traded to the Bridgeport Bluefish. He retired on August 6, 2015. In 22 games he hit .243/.341/.284 with 0 home runs, 5 RBIs and 1 stolen base.
