= Clint Sammons =

American baseball player (born 1983)

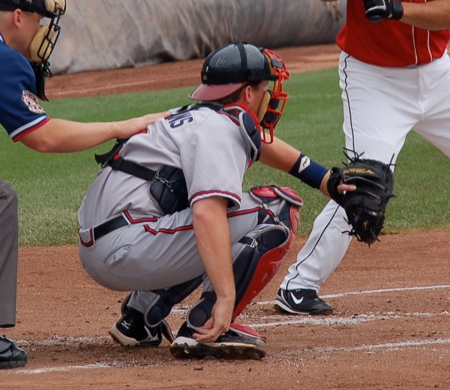
- Sammons with the Gwinnett Braves in 2008
- Catcher
- Born: May 15, 1983 (age 42); Decatur, Georgia, U.S.
- Batted: Right Threw: Right

MLB debut
- September 12, 2007, for the Atlanta Braves

Last MLB appearance
- October 4, 2009, for the Atlanta Braves

MLB statistics
- Batting average: .176
- Home runs: 1
- Runs batted in: 4
- Stats at Baseball Reference

Teams
- Atlanta Braves (2007–2009)

Clint Joseph Sammons (born May 15, 1983) is an American former professional baseball catcher who played in Major League Baseball (MLB) for the Atlanta Braves from 2007 to 2009.

== Amateur career ==
A native of Lilburn, Georgia, Sammons attended Parkview High School, and was selected by the Los Angeles Dodgers in the 43rd round of the 2001 MLB draft. He did not sign with them however, and instead played college baseball at the University of Georgia, where he was starting catcher. In 2003, he played collegiate summer baseball with the Cotuit Kettleers of the Cape Cod Baseball League and was named a league all-star. He was selected by the Braves in the 6th round of the 2004 MLB draft and eventually signed with the Braves.

== Professional career ==
Sammons began his professional career with the Braves Rookie team, the Danville Braves. He played for the Single-A Rome Braves in 2005 and was selected to the South Atlantic League midseason All-Star team. The Braves organization named Sammons as the Rome Braves Player of the Year. In 121 games with the Rome Braves, he batted .286 with 4 home runs. In 2006, he spent the entire season with the Single-A Myrtle Beach Pelicans.

In 2007, he began the season with the Myrtle Beach Pelicans again. After 23 games with the Pelicans, he was promoted to the Double-A Mississippi Braves. He went on the finish the minor league season at Mississippi. On September 11, 2007, the Braves added him to the major league roster as the fourth catcher when they purchased his contract. The next day, he made his major league debut as a defensive replacement. He got his first two Major League hits on September 30, the last day of the season, which included a double. He hit his first Major League home run on July 31, 2008. Sammons became a free agent at the end of the 2009 season. He signed a one-year minor league contract with the Braves for the 2010 season, then signed two one-year, minor league contracts with the Miami Marlins for the 2011–2012 seasons.
