= Will Ohman =

American baseball player & coach (born 1977)

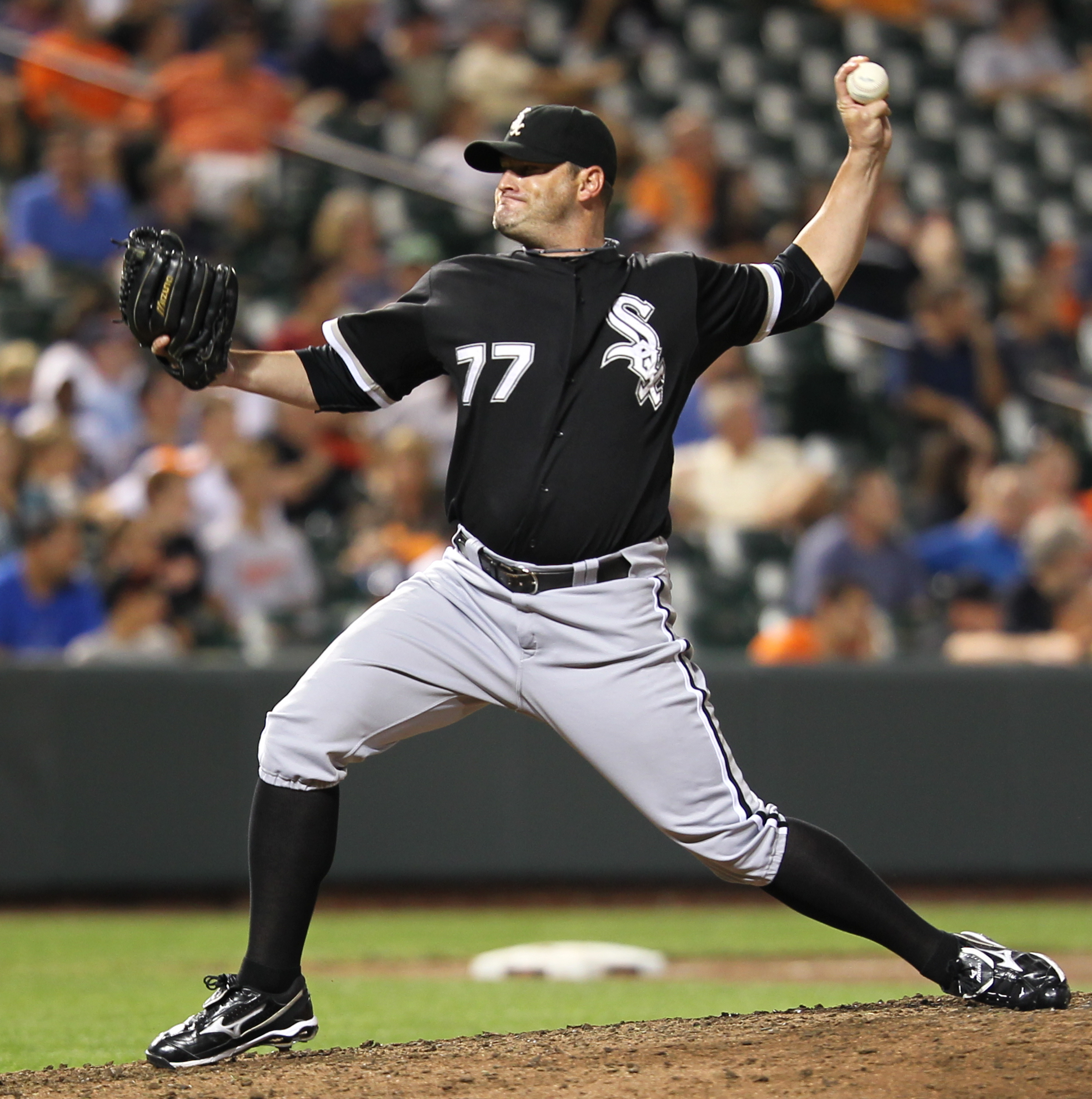
- Ohman with the Chicago White Sox
- Pitcher
- Born: August 13, 1977 (age 49); Frankfurt, West Germany
- Batted: Left Threw: Left

MLB debut
- September 19, 2000, for the Chicago Cubs

Last MLB appearance
- June 27, 2012, for the Chicago White Sox

MLB statistics
- Win–loss record: 12–16
- Earned run average: 4.28
- Strikeouts: 336
- Stats at Baseball Reference

Teams
- Chicago Cubs (2000–2001, 2005–2007); Atlanta Braves (2008); Los Angeles Dodgers (2009); Baltimore Orioles (2010); Florida Marlins (2010); Chicago White Sox (2011–2012)

William McDaniel Ohman (born August 13, 1977) is a German–born American former professional baseball pitcher. He attended Ponderosa High school in Parker, Colorado. He played in Major League Baseball (MLB) for the Chicago Cubs, Atlanta Braves, Los Angeles Dodgers, Baltimore Orioles, Florida Marlins and Chicago White Sox. In January 2018, Ohman was named the pitching coach for the Palm Beach Cardinals.

== College career ==
He played for Pepperdine University in the late 1990s, where he met his wife.

== Professional career ==
=== Chicago Cubs ===
Ohman was selected in the eighth round of the 1998 MLB draft by the Chicago Cubs. He spent all of 1998 and 1999 in the Cubs minor league system.

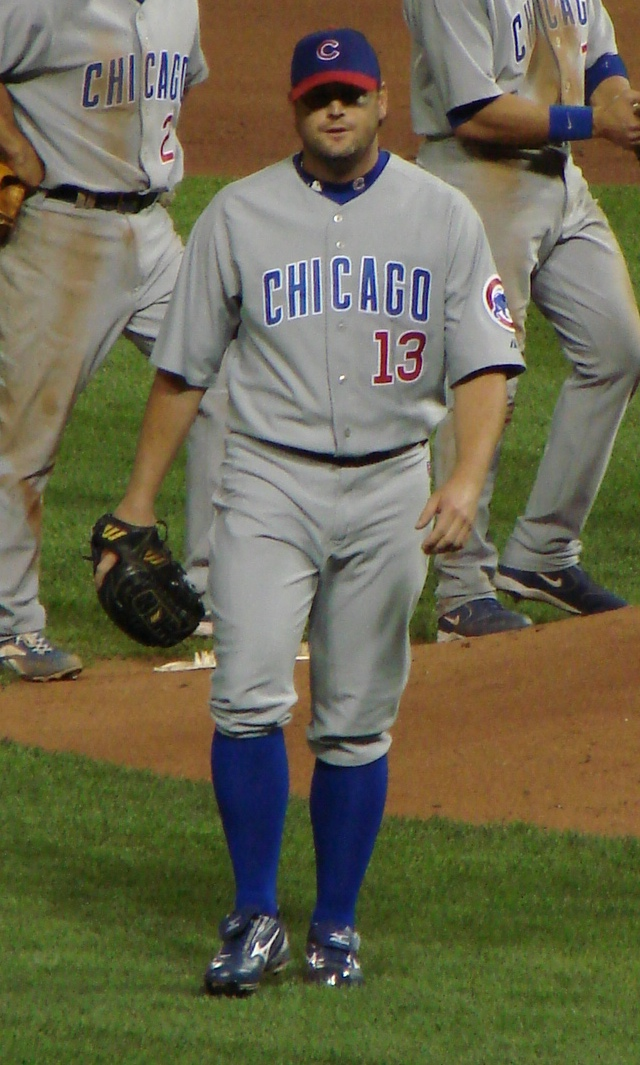
Ohman with the Cubs

Ohman made his major league debut on September 19, 2000 against the Milwaukee Brewers, pitching one scoreless inning of relief. He also pitched for the Cubs in 2001, but had Tommy John surgery in 2002 and did not pitch again until 2004. In 2004, he pitched for the minor league Iowa Cubs and in the following off-season, he was added to the Major League 40 man roster. On April 26, 2005, he was called up from the minors and on the same day, made his major league first pitching appearance since 2001. Ohman also recorded the Opening Day win for the Cubs on April 2, 2006.

=== Atlanta Braves ===
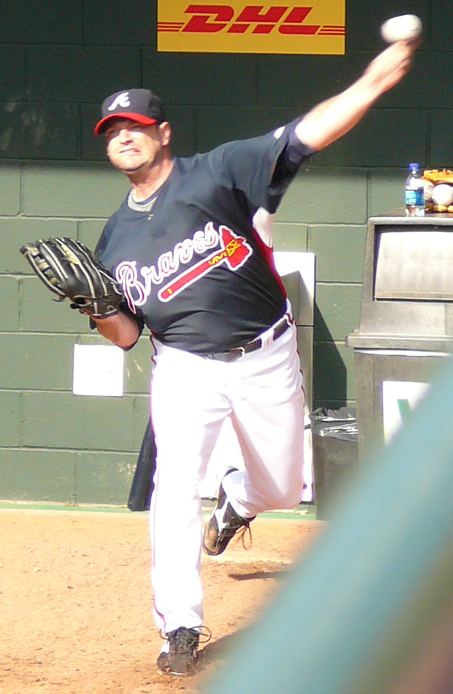
Ohman with the Braves in 2008.

On December 4, 2007, Ohman was traded along with Omar Infante to the Atlanta Braves for José Ascanio. With Atlanta, Ohman enjoyed a successful season out of the Braves' bullpen, appearing in 83 games. He finished the season as one of the team's most successful relievers, with a record of 4-1 and an ERA of 3.68. He became a free agent at the conclusion of the season.

=== Los Angeles Dodgers ===
On March 30, 2009, Ohman signed a minor league contract with the Los Angeles Dodgers, and made the club out of spring training as a situational left-handed reliever.

However, Ohman only made 21 appearances with the Dodgers in 2009 and spent the last four months of the season on the disabled list after suffering a shoulder injury. The Dodgers declined his option on October 16 and he became a free agent.

=== Baltimore Orioles ===
Ohman was invited to the Orioles camp as a non-roster invitee. He made the team on April 3, 2010. He appeared in 51 games for the Orioles, with a 3.30 ERA.

=== Florida Marlins ===
On July 31, 2010, Ohman was dealt to the Florida Marlins in exchange for Rick VandenHurk. He appeared in 17 games for the Marlins, with a 3.00 ERA.

=== Chicago White Sox ===
On January 8, 2011, Ohman agreed to a 2-year, $4 million contract with the Chicago White Sox. He appeared in 59 games in 2011, with a 4.22 ERA. On June 28, 2012, Ohman was designated for assignment after appearing in 32 games with a record of 0-2 and an ERA of 6.41. He was released on July 3.

=== Cincinnati Reds ===
Ohman signed with the Cincinnati Reds on July 21, and was assigned to the Triple-A Louisville Bats.

=== Washington Nationals ===
Ohman signed a minor league contract with the Washington Nationals on February 11, 2013. He was released on March 9, 2013.

=== Coaching career ===
Ohman was named the pitching coach for the Palm Beach Cardinals in 2018.

== Pitching style ==
Ohman's repertoire consisted mainly of four-seam and two-seam fastballs around 88–91 mph, as well as a slider at 79–82. He threw a handful of curveballs and changeups. Half of his pitches with two strikes were sliders.
