= Wil Ledezma =

Venezuelan baseball player (born 1981)

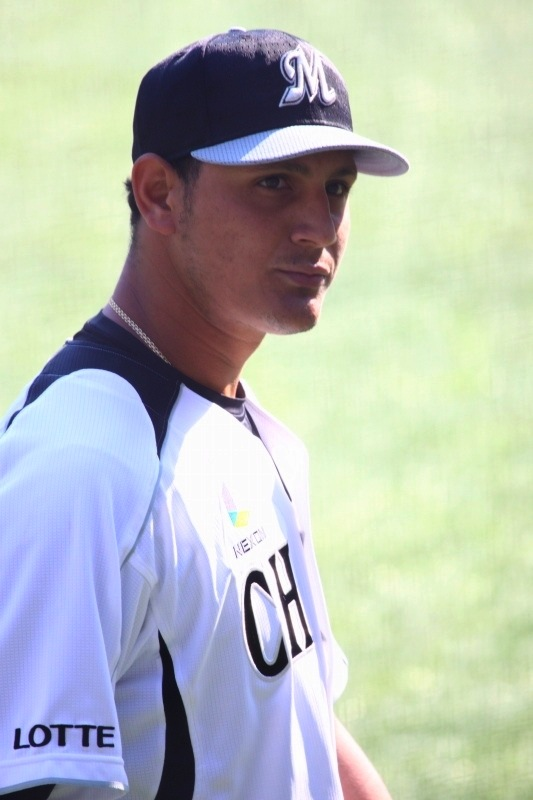
- Ledezma with the Chiba Lotte Marines
- Pitcher
- Born: January 21, 1981 (age 45); Valle de la Pascua, Guárico State, Venezuela
- Batted: Left Threw: Left

Professional debut
- MLB: April 2, 2003, for the Detroit Tigers
- NPB: August 24, 2012, for the Chiba Lotte Marines

Last appearance
- MLB: August 28, 2011, for the Toronto Blue Jays
- NPB: October 8, 2013, for the Chiba Lotte Marines

MLB statistics
- Win–loss record: 15–25
- Earned run average: 5.40
- Strikeouts: 283

NPB statistics
- Win–loss record: 3–3
- Earned run average: 3.69
- Strikeouts: 23
- Stats at Baseball Reference

Teams
- Detroit Tigers (2003–2007); Atlanta Braves (2007); San Diego Padres (2007–2008); Arizona Diamondbacks (2008); Washington Nationals (2009); Pittsburgh Pirates (2010); Toronto Blue Jays (2011); Chiba Lotte Marines (2012–2013)

Wilfredo Jose Ledezma Acosta (born January 21, 1981) is a Venezuelan former professional baseball pitcher. He played in Major League Baseball (MLB) for the Detroit Tigers, Atlanta Braves, San Diego Padres, Arizona Diamondbacks, Washington Nationals, Toronto Blue Jays, and Pittsburgh Pirates, and in Nippon Professional Baseball (NPB) for the Chiba Lotte Marines. He bats and throws left-handed.

== Career ==
=== Boston Red Sox ===
Ledezma was originally signed by the Boston Red Sox as an amateur free agent in 1998. He started his career with the DSL Red Sox in 1998, playing for them one season before joining the GCL Red Sox (1999) and the Augusta Greenjackets (2000). He missed the entire 2001 season due to a stress fracture in his left elbow. In 2002, he returned to Augusta but was shut down for the rest of the season on May 22 due to a lower back strain.

=== Detroit Tigers ===
Ledezma was drafted by the Detroit Tigers in the 2002 Rule 5 draft on December 16, 2002, and made his Major League debut on April 2, 2003, for the Tigers, working two scoreless innings against the Minnesota Twins. His first win came in a two-inning relief appearance on June 4 against the San Diego Padres. He made his first start on July 8 against the Chicago White Sox. Overall, he was in 34 games (8 starts) during his rookie season and finished 3–7 with a 5.79 ERA.

Between 2004 and 2007, he alternated between pitching for the Tigers and for the AA Erie SeaWolves and AAA Toledo Mud Hens. In 2004 with Erie, he was named the Tigers "minor league pitcher of the year" and selected to the Eastern League mid-season all-star team. He pitched in 106 games for Detroit, with a 15–18 record and 5.15 ERA. Ledezma was also the winning pitcher in game 4 of the 2006 American League Championship Series.

=== Atlanta Braves ===
Ledezma was traded from the Tigers to the Atlanta Braves for Macay McBride on June 20, 2007. On July 13, 2007, he was placed on the restricted list. He had gone home to Venezuela during the All-Star break, during which he accidentally damaged his visa and passport in the washing machine. The Braves activated him from the restricted list on July 19, 2007. Ledezma was designated for assignment on July 29 by the Braves. He was 0–2 with a 7.71 ERA in 12 appearances for Atlanta.

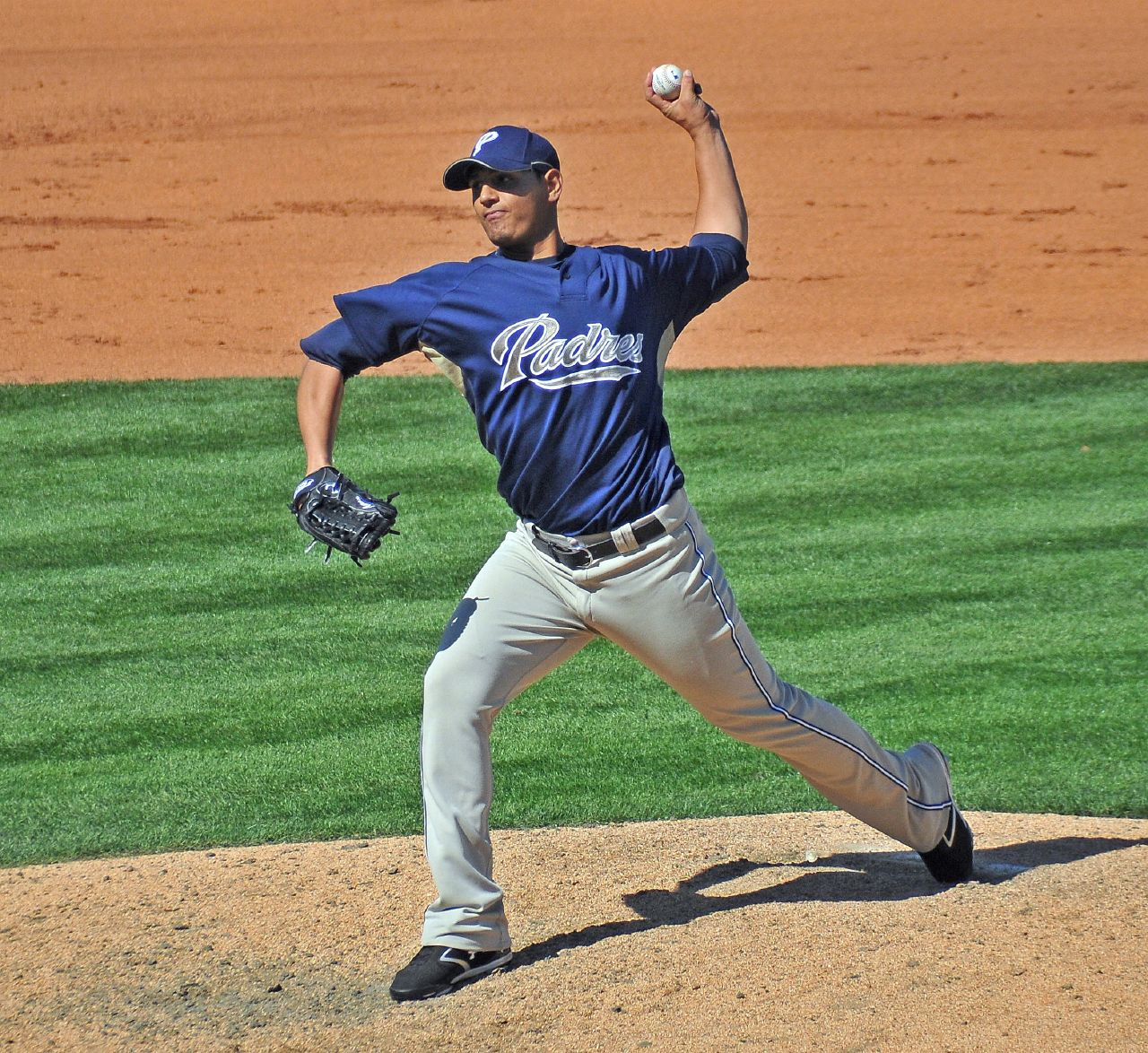
Ledezma on the mound during 2008 spring training.

=== San Diego Padres ===
On July 31, 2007, Ledezma was traded to the San Diego Padres for reliever Royce Ring. He appeared in 9 games with the Padres, with an ERA of 6.28 and also appeared in 11 games for the Triple-A Portland Beavers, where his ERA was 4.41.

=== Arizona Diamondbacks ===
On August 29, 2008, Ledezma was claimed off waivers by the Arizona Diamondbacks and appeared in 3 games for them before he was non-tendered following the season, becoming a free agent.

=== Washington Nationals ===
In January 2009, he signed a minor league contract with the Washington Nationals. He appeared in only 5 games for the Nationals, spending most of his time with the Syracuse Chiefs. He was released on July 6, 2009.

=== Toronto Blue Jays ===
Ledezma signed with the Toronto Blue Jays on August 5, 2009, and pitched in 8 games for the New Hampshire Fisher Cats and 3 for the Dunedin Blue Jays but was never called up to the Majors. In October 2009, he was granted free agency.

=== Pittsburgh Pirates ===
On November 30, 2009, Ledezma signed a minor league contract with the Pittsburgh Pirates, with an invite to Spring training.

On July 27, 2010, he was called up with Steven Jackson to replace Brad Lincoln and Brendan Donnelly. The Pirates designated Ledezma for assignment on December 24, 2010, to clear roster space after signing free agent pitcher Aaron Thompson. He was in 27 games for the Pirates, with an 0–3 record and 6.86 ERA.

=== Toronto Blue Jays ===
On January 5, 2011, Ledezma was claimed off waivers by the Toronto Blue Jays. He began the 2011 season with the Triple-A Las Vegas 51s before having his contract purchased on July 23. Jo-Jo Reyes was designated for assignment to make room on the 40-man roster for Ledezma.

Following a 12–0 loss to the Tampa Bay Rays on August 28 (during which Ledezma pitched the ninth inning and surrendered 6 earned runs on five hits and 3 walks), Ledezma was designated for assignment. Brian Tallet was called up to replace Ledezma. After the 2011 season, he elected for free agency.

=== Los Angeles Dodgers ===
On December 7, 2011, Ledezma signed a minor league contract with the Los Angeles Dodgers that contained an invitation to spring training. The Dodgers assigned him to the Triple-A Albuquerque Isotopes to start the 2012 season. He appeared in 38 games for the Isotopes, posting a 3–3 record and 6.99 ERA. Ledezma was released on July 24, 2012.

=== Chiba Lotte Marines ===
On July 27, 2012, Ledezma signed with the Lotte Marines of the Nippon Professional Baseball. On August 24, he made his NPB debut. On December 1, Ledezma re-signed with Marines. Ledezma recorded a 3.23 ERA in 26 games for Lotte in 2013. On November 25, 2013, Ledezma became a free agent.

=== Detroit Tigers (second stint) ===
Ledezma signed a minor league deal with the Detroit Tigers on March 3, 2014. On March 27, 2014, Ledezma was released by the Tigers organization.

=== Leones de Yucatán ===
On June 13, 2014, Ledezma signed with the Leones de Yucatán of the Mexican League. He recorded a 1.91 ERA in 27 appearances before becoming a free agent after the year.

=== Minnesota Twins ===
On December 23, 2014, Ledezma signed a minor league contract with the Minnesota Twins organization that contained an invitation to spring training. He was released on April 2, 2015.

=== Pericos de Puebla ===
On May 18, 2015, he signed with the Pericos de Puebla of the Mexican Baseball League. In 21 games for Puebla, Ledezma logged a 3–4 record and 3.55 ERA. On December 2, 2015, Ledezma was traded to the Leones de Yucatán. He was released by the team on February 5, 2016. On April 1, Ledezma re-signed with Puebla, and posted a 4.91 ERA in 21 games before being released on May 26.

=== Rojos del Águila de Veracruz ===
On May 27, 2016, Ledezma signed with the Rojos del Águila de Veracruz, where he logged a 2.03 ERA in 30 appearances. He became a free agent after the 2016 season. Ledezma later resigned with the club on June 20, 2017. In 21 games for Veracruz, Ledezma logged a 3.27 ERA with 27 strikeouts. He then became a free agent again following the 2017 season.

=== Piratas de Campeche ===
On March 31, 2019, Ledezma signed with the Piratas de Campeche of the Mexican League. He was released on May 2, 2019.

=== Tecolotes de los Dos Laredos ===
On June 27, 2021, Ledezma signed with the Tecolotes de los Dos Laredos of the Mexican League. On July 13, Ledezma was released by Dos Laredos after recording a 9.00 ERA in 3 appearances.

== See also ==
- List of Major League Baseball players from Venezuela
- Rule 5 draft results
