= Woodsville High School =

Coordinates: 44°08′41″N 72°02′10″W

- 9 High Street; Woodsville, New Hampshire; USA

Information
- Type: Public
- Established: 1896
- Principal: Hayden Coon
- Teaching staff: 22.00 (FTE)
- Grades: 9-12
- Enrollment: 221 (2024-2025)
- Student to teacher ratio: 10.05
- Campus: Small town
- Colors: Dark green and white
- Mascot: Engineers
- Website: www.woodsvillehighschool.com

Woodsville High School, in Woodsville, New Hampshire, is a public secondary school located in the White Mountains of New Hampshire, serving the towns of Haverhill (including North Haverhill, East Haverhill, Woodsville, and Mountain Lakes), Bath, Warren, Piermont, and Benton.

The school is operated by School Administrative Unit 23.

== Notable people ==
=== Alumni ===
- Raymond S. Burton, longest serving member of the New Hampshire Executive Council in state history
- Paul I. LaMott (1917–2011), member of the New Hampshire House of Representatives
- Mike Olsen, NASCAR driver
- Chad Paronto, Major League Baseball player
- Dennis Ruprecht, member of the New Hampshire House of Representatives from 2018-2021
- Bob Smith, Major League Baseball pitcher
- Frank Stoddard, NASCAR crew chief

=== Faculty ===
- Ann Stone Minot, biochemist and physiologist
