= Twin State Mutual Aid Fire Association =

The Twin State Mutual Aid Fire Association ("Twin State") is the dispatch center and coordinating agency for fire and emergency medical services operations in 23 towns in Grafton County, New Hampshire, and Orange County and Caledonia County in Vermont. Dispatching duties are handled by the Grafton County Sheriff's Department stationed in North Haverhill, New Hampshire.

Most of the departments in the Twin State system rely heavily on volunteer fire and EMS personnel, although positions are staffed by full-time members. Some departments like Littleton have a mix of full-time and on-call firefighters, while other departments like Landaff are entirely volunteer.

Private and municipal ambulance services are used in the service area. Two such services are run by Calex Ambulance Service in St. Johnsbury and Woodsville Ambulance in Haverhill. Individual towns contract for their services. Some towns like Lisbon use a Life Squad or FAST (First Aid Stabilization Team) Squad, which is a first responder corps staffed by paid volunteers in addition to the ambulance service. Littleton Regional Hospital runs the Littleton Regional Paramedic service, which provides advanced life support for the greater Littleton area.

All radio dispatches use the frequency 154.4000 under the callsign KSI-676.

== Service area ==
The following towns are served by Twin State Mutual Aid:

New Hampshire

- Bath
- Bethlehem
- Carroll (including Twin Mountain)
- Easton
- Franconia
- Haverhill (including North Haverhill and Woodsville)
- Landaff
- Lincoln
- Lisbon
- Littleton
- Lyman
- Monroe
- Piermont
- Sugar Hill
- Woodstock

Vermont

- Barnet
- Groton
- Newbury (including village of Wells River)
- Ryegate

Some towns like Benton and Lyman do not have their own fire departments and contract with surrounding towns to service their calls.
