= Marie Louise Bjelobrk =

American politician

Member of the New Hampshire House of Representatives from the Grafton 5th district
- Incumbent
- Assumed office December 4, 2024 Serving with Rick Ladd
- Preceded by: Matthew Coulon

Personal details
- Party: Republican
- Spouse: Matthew Dominic Bjelobrk
- Occupation: Physical therapist; politician

Marie Louise Bjelobrk is an American politician, physical therapist, and a practictioner of myofascial release, an alternative medicine therapy. A member of the Republican Party, she serves in the New Hampshire House of Representatives from the Grafton 5th district.

She is a proponent of New Hampshire's school voucher program, known as Education Freedom Accounts. Bjelobrk has said she opposes school funding for diversity, equity, and inclusion programs or "for instruction in critical race theory".

Bjelobrk was formerly known as Marie Louise Francis. She is the owner and the Orthopedic Manual Physical Therapist of North Shore Myofascial Physical Therapy, which had a location in Port Jefferson Station, New York, and now operates as Blackmount Physical Therapy in North Haverhill, New Hampshire. She is the president of Blackmount Physical Therapy, and speaks French. She has been a licensed physical therapist in New York and New Hampshire.

Her husband, Matthew Dominic Bjelobrk, is a former selectman of Haverhill, New Hampshire.

Bjelobrk received the second-most votes in both the 2024 Republican party primary election and the 2024 general election for the two-member Grafton 5th district in the New Hampshire House of Representatives.

== Electoral history ==
New Hampshire House of Representatives general election for the Grafton 5th district, 2024 Source:
Party	Candidate	Votes	%
Republican	Rick Ladd	2,126	31.24
Republican	Marie Louise Bjelobrk	2,088	30.68
Democratic	Rachael Booth	1,375	20.20
Democratic	Dustin Vigneault	1,217	17.88
Total votes		6,806	100

New Hampshire House of Representatives Republican party primary election for the Grafton 5th district, 2024 Source:
Party	Candidate	Votes	%
Republican	Rick Ladd	454	39
Republican	Marie Louise Bjelobrk	411	35
Republican	Greg Mathieson	302	26
Total votes		1,167	100
