= Bedell Covered Bridge =

Bedell Bridge
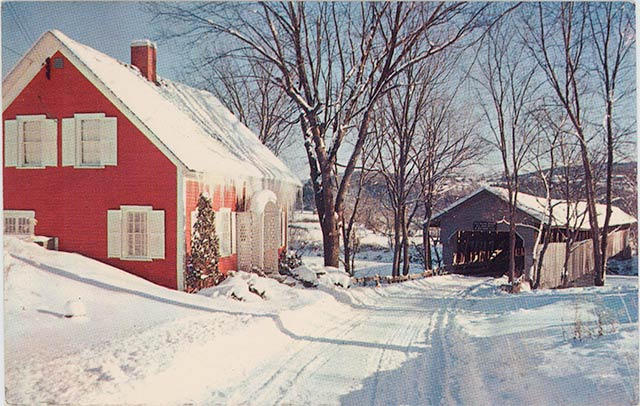
- Former Bedell Bridge from Vermont side, c.1960
- Coordinates: 44°02′43″N 72°04′27″W
- Bedell Covered Bridge
- U.S. National Register of Historic Places
- Location within New Hampshire Location within Vermont Location within the United States
- Nearest city: Newbury, Vermont and Haverhill, New Hampshire
- Coordinates: 44°2′43″N 72°04′27″W
- Area: 1 acre (0.4 ha)
- Architectural style: Burr truss covered bridge
- NRHP reference No.: 75002171
- Added to NRHP: May 28, 1975
- Crosses: Connecticut River
- Locale: Newbury, Vermont and Haverhill, New Hampshire

Characteristics
- Design: Burr truss covered bridge
- Total length: 396 ft (121 m)

History
- Construction end: 1805, 1823, ?, 1866, 1978
- Opened: July 22, 1979
- Closed: 1823, 1841, 1862, July 4, 1866, September 14, 1979

Location
- Interactive map of Bedell Bridge

The Bedell Bridge was a Burr truss covered bridge that spanned the Connecticut River between Newbury, Vermont and Haverhill, New Hampshire. Until its most recent destruction in 1979, it was, with a total length of 382 feet (116 m), the second-longest covered bridge in the United States. (Note: see Cornish–Windsor Covered Bridge) The bridge was divided into two spans of roughly equal length, and rested on a central pier and shore abutments constructed from mortared rough stone. The eastern abutment has been shored up by the addition of a concrete footing. The bridge was 23 feet (7.0 m) wide, with a roadway width of 18.5 feet (5.6 m). Because the state line is the western low-water mark of the Connecticut River, most of the bridge was in New Hampshire; only the western abutment is in Vermont.

The site is now part of the 74-acre (30 ha) Bedell Bridge State Park in Haverhill, New Hampshire.

== History ==
There have been six bridges on this site. The first was built in 1805 and heavily damaged in 1823. Quickly rebuilt that year, it was washed away in 1841. A third bridge was carried away by a spring flood in 1862. The fourth bridge was destroyed in a storm on July 4, 1866, and replaced the same year. This fifth bridge was in service for 92 years, until it was closed to traffic in 1958. It was scheduled for demolition in 1973 due to heavy damage that year.

A "Save the Bedell Bridge Committee" raised $250,000 to rebuild the bridge, which was completed by 1978, and included the establishment of the associated Bedell Bridge State Park in the area of the eastern abutment. The bridge was rededicated on July 22, 1979, only to be blown away again by a windstorm on September 14, 1979 according to the marker on site, see image below. The state park, as well as the abutments and a pier in the river, are all that remain.

When first built, the bridge was in private ownership, and a toll was charged to cross it. In 1916, the towns of Newbury and Haverhill purchased the bridge and eliminated the toll. Ownership of the bridge was transferred to the state of New Hampshire in 1967.

== Image gallery ==
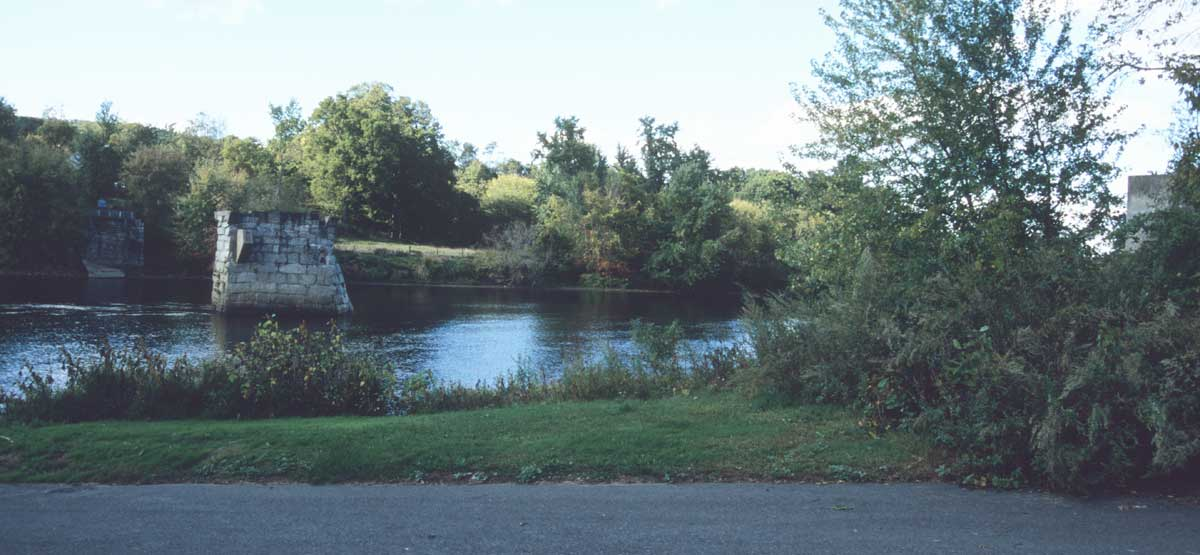
Site of the bridge, with a pier standing alone in the river

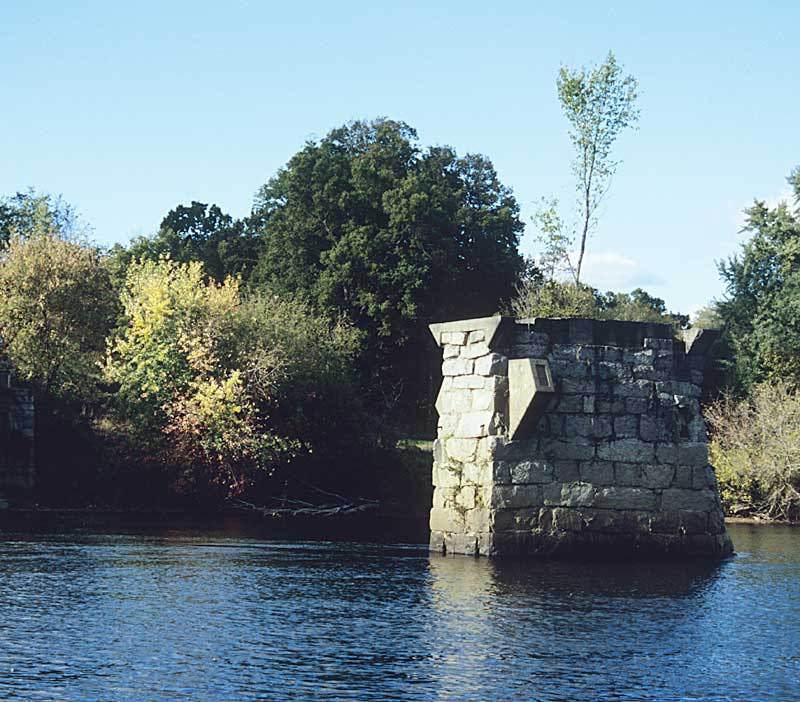
The pier complete with crowning tree.

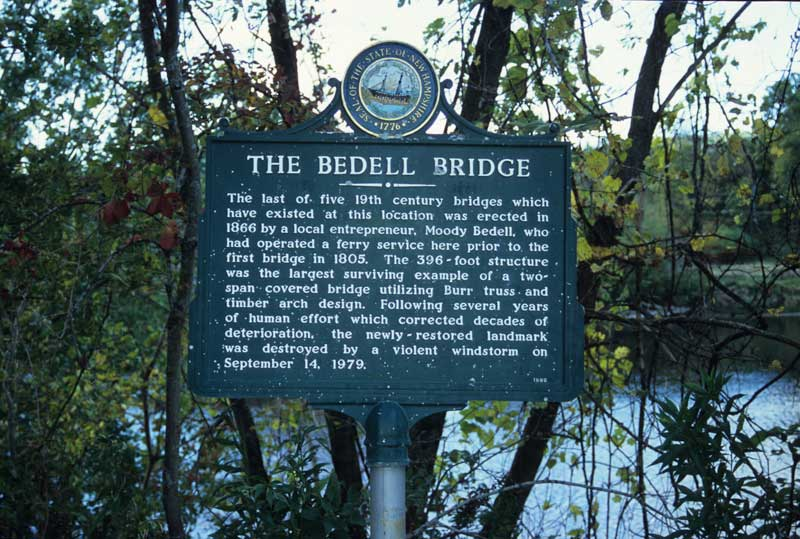
New Hampshire Historical Marker No. 136

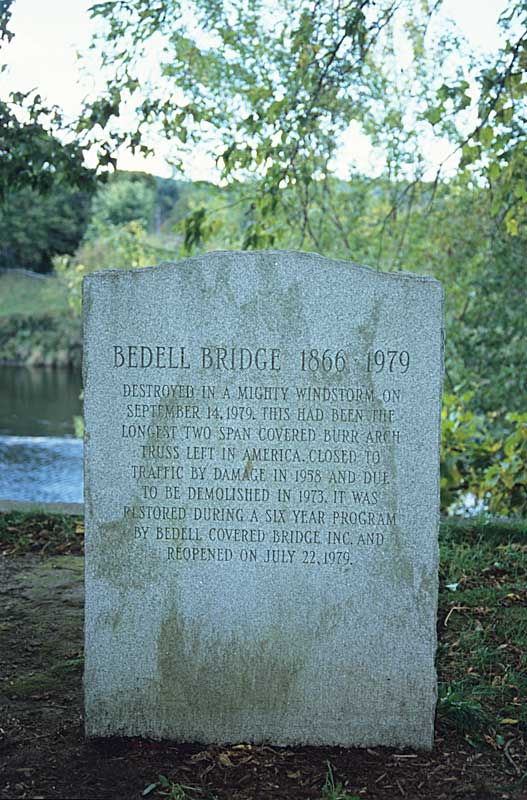
The memorial marker

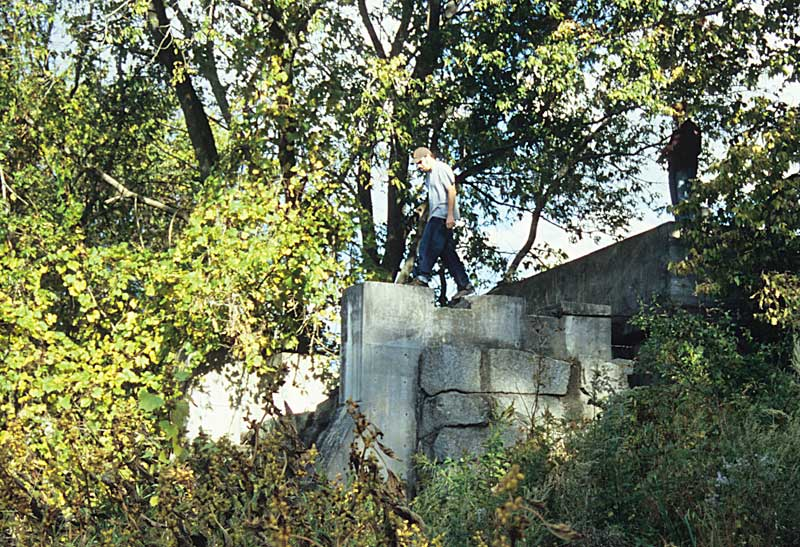
People on the eastern abutment, giving a sense of scale

== See also ==
- List of crossings of the Connecticut River
- List of New Hampshire covered bridges
- List of Vermont covered bridges
- National Register of Historic Places listings in Grafton County, New Hampshire
- National Register of Historic Places listings in Orange County, Vermont
- List of bridges on the National Register of Historic Places in New Hampshire
- List of bridges on the National Register of Historic Places in Vermont
