= Bonnie Ham =

American politician (born 1947)

Member of the New Hampshire House of Representatives from the Grafton 5th district
- In office December 2, 2020 – December 7, 2022
- Preceded by: Jerry M. Stringham
- Succeeded by: Roderick "Rick" Ladd; Matthew Coulon
- In office December 7, 2016 – December 4, 2018
- Preceded by: Edmond D. Gionet
- Succeeded by: Jerry M. Stringham

Member of the New Hampshire House of Representatives from the Grafton 12th district
- In office December 4, 2002 – December 1, 2004
- Preceded by: Paul Mirski
- Succeeded by: District abolished

Member of the New Hampshire House of Representatives from the Grafton 4th district
- In office December 1, 2004 – December 6, 2006
- Preceded by: Herself (2002)
- Succeeded by: Robert Matheson
- In office December 2, 1992 – December 4, 2002
- Preceded by: Roger Stewart
- Succeeded by: Herself (2004)

Personal details
- Born: October 5, 1947 (age 78)
- Party: Republican
- Children: 2
- Education: Plymouth State University

Bonnie D. Ham (born October 5, 1947) is an American politician from the state of New Hampshire. A Republican, Ham most recently represented the 5th Grafton district in the New Hampshire House of Representatives from 2020 to 2022.

Prior to her election to the New Hampshire House of Representatives in 2020, she served two previous stints in the same legislative body from 1992 to 2006 and again from 2016 to 2018. She previously served as a Woodstock Selectman from 1974 to 1992.

New Hampshire House of Representatives
Preceded by Roger Stewart	Member of the New Hampshire House of Representatives from the Grafton 4th district 1992–2002	Succeeded by Herself (2004)
Preceded by Paul Mirski	Member of the New Hampshire House of Representatives from the Grafton 12th district 2002–2004	Succeeded by District abolished
Preceded by Herself (2002)	Member of the New Hampshire House of Representatives from the Grafton 4th district 2004–2006	Succeeded by Robert Matheson
Preceded by Edmond D. Gionet	Member of the New Hampshire House of Representatives from the Grafton 5th district 2016–2018	Succeeded by Jerry M. Stringham
Preceded by Jerry M. Stringham	Member of the New Hampshire House of Representatives from the Grafton 5th district 2020–2022	Succeeded by Roderick "Rick" Ladd; Matthew Coulon
