= Dennis Ruprecht =

American politician (born 1999)

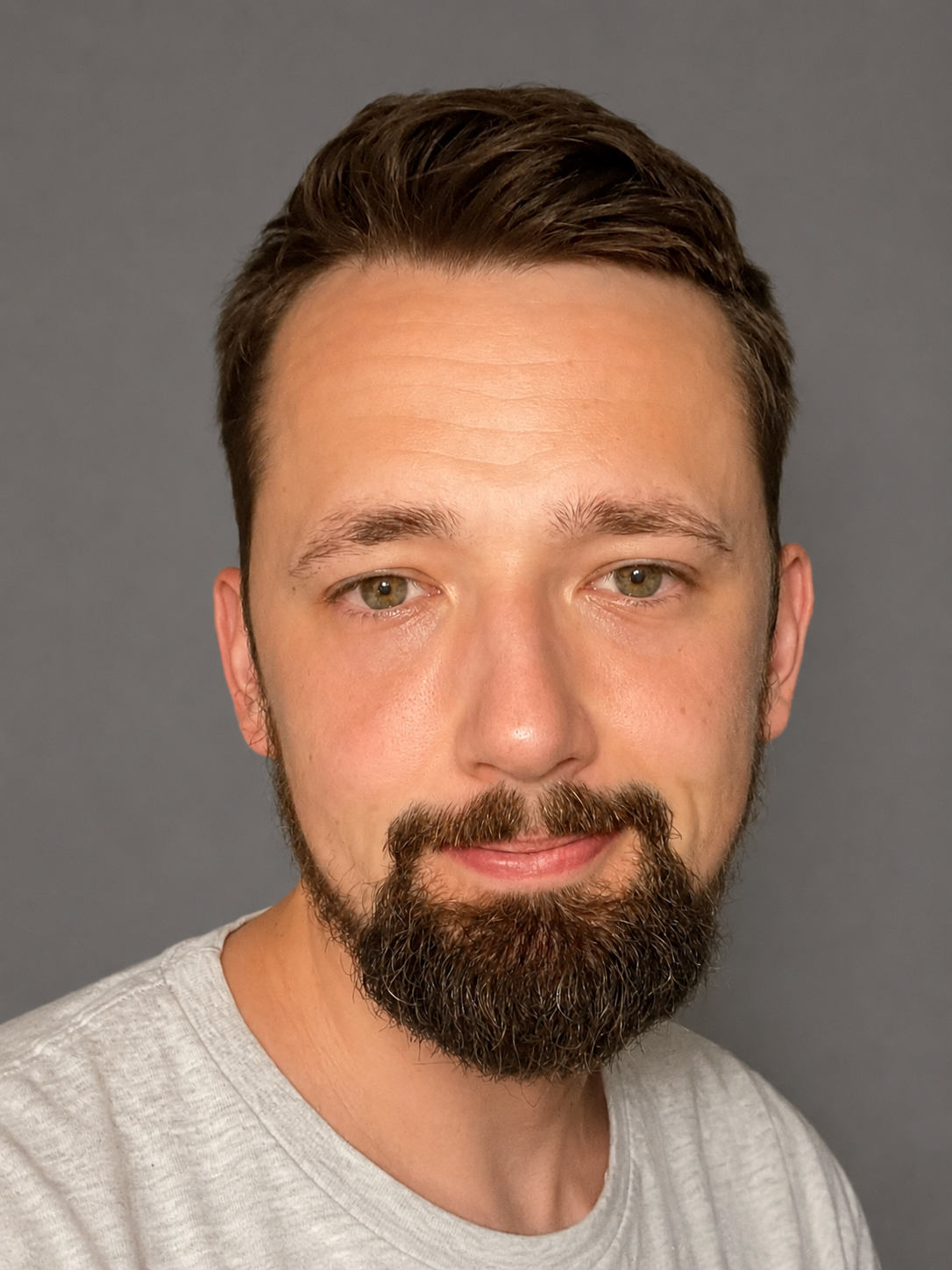
- Ruprecht in 2026

Member of the New Hampshire House of Representatives from the Grafton 3rd district
- In office December 2, 2020 – December 17, 2021
- Preceded by: Susan M. Ford
- Succeeded by: Jerry Stringham

Member of the New Hampshire House of Representatives from the Grafton 15th district
- In office December 5, 2018 – December 2, 2020
- Preceded by: David Binford
- Succeeded by: David Binford

Personal details
- Born: May 15, 1999 (age 27) Littleton, New Hampshire, U.S.
- Party: Independent (2022-Present)
- Other political affiliations: Democratic (2017-2021)
- Education: Plymouth State University (BA)

Dennis Michael Ruprecht Jr. (born May 15, 1999) is a former New Hampshire politician who was a member of the New Hampshire House of Representatives from December 5, 2018, to December 17, 2021. During his time in office he was one of the youngest state legislators in the history of the United States.

== Early life and education ==
Ruprecht was born on May 15, 1999, in Littleton, New Hampshire, and grew up in Bath, New Hampshire. He graduated from Woodsville High School in 2017, and that same year was chosen for the United States Senate Youth Program.

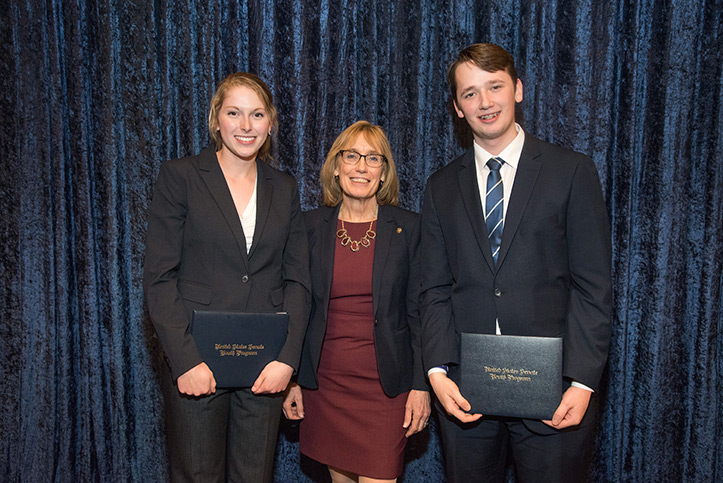
Dennis Ruprecht with Senator Maggie Hassan in the Kennedy Caucus Room for a USSYP Reception

After graduating from Woodsville High School, Ruprecht enrolled at the University of New Hampshire where he was a member of Phi Mu Delta and the UNH Student Senate. Ruprecht then briefly attended Saint Michael's College before transferring to Plymouth State University where he graduated summa cum laude with a Bachelor of Arts in political science in 2021.

== New Hampshire House of Representatives ==
=== Electoral history ===
Ruprecht first ran for election to the New Hampshire House of Representatives to represent the Grafton 15th district in 2018. He won in the general election on November 6, 2018, with 54.8% of the vote. Ruprecht was first elected at the age of 19, and was the youngest currently-serving member of the House at the time that he was sworn in. He credited Senator Bernie Sanders for inspiring him to become involved in politics.

In 2020, Ruprecht was re-elected to the New Hampshire House of Representatives to represent the Grafton 3rd district on November 3, receiving 53.4% of the vote.

=== Tenure ===
Ruprecht served in the New Hampshire House of Representatives from December 5, 2018, until stepping down on December 17, 2021. Ruprecht resigned due to having moved out of his district to Vermont. In 2021 he was selected as a NewDEAL leader.

During the 2019 legislative session, he helped repeal the death penalty in New Hampshire by voting to override a gubernatorial veto of legislation abolishing its use in the state.

Ruprecht was a member of the House Committee on Fish and Game and Marine Resources. He received an “A” rating from the wildlife advocacy group Voices of Wildlife in New Hampshire.

== National politics ==
Ruprecht was an early supporter of Joe Biden during the 2020 Democratic Party presidential primaries having endorsed him in July 2019, months ahead of the New Hampshire presidential primary. Ruprecht was selected as one of seventeen speakers to jointly deliver the keynote address at the 2020 Democratic National Convention.

== Personal life ==
Ruprecht is Roman Catholic. He has resided in both New Hampshire and Vermont.

Party political offices
Preceded by Elizabeth Warren	Keynote Speaker of the Democratic National Convention; 2020; Served alongside: Stacey Abrams, Raumesh Akbari, Colin Allred, Brendan Boyle, Yvanna Cancela, Kathleen Clyde, Nikki Fried, Robert Garcia, Malcolm Kenyatta, Marlon Kimpson, Conor Lamb, Mari Manoogian, Victoria Neave, Jonathan Nez, Sam Park, Randall Woodfin	Succeeded by Angela Alsobrooks
