= Fanny Runnells Poole =

American writer (1863–1940)

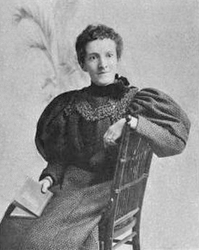
- Photo in New Hampshire women (1895)
- Born: Fanny Huntington Runnells; 1863; Orford, New Hampshire, U.S.
- Died: 1940 (aged 76–77)
- Occupations: Writer, book reviewer
- Spouse: Allan A. Paul Poole (m. 1890)
- Relatives: Samuel Huntington, Daniel Huntington
- Writing career
- Pen name: Fanny H. Runnells Poole
- Language: English
- Notable works: A Bank of Violets : Verses, Mugen : A Book of Verse

Fanny Runnells Poole (née, Runnells; 1863–1940) was an American writer. She was a book reviewer for Home Journal and Town and Country, 1894–8. She was the author of A Bank of Violets (verse), 1895; Three Songs of Love (music), 1906; and Mugen (verse), 1908. She also compiled an unpublished poetical anthology. Poole enjoyed singing, teaching, the care of little children, the culture of flowers, embroidery, and old book and picture collections. But her absorbing passion was poetry.

== Early life and education ==
Fanny (sometimes spelled Fannie) Huntington Runnells was born at Orford, New Hampshire, in 1863. Her parents were Rev. Moses Thurston Runnells, a historian and 23 years pastor of the Congregational Church at Sanbornton, and Fannie Maria Baker Runnells. She was directly descended from the early Huntingtons of Connecticut, including Governor Samuel Huntington, Jedediah Huntington in poetry, and Daniel Huntington in art.

Isolated, to a large degree, from the comradeship of other children, her purest delights were "to wander in the fields, browse at will in her father's library, or pore over her mother's music books at the piano." In her long out-of-door rambles among the birds and flowers, she found it easy to lisp her love of things beautiful in rhyme. By some happy chance, a copy of Palgrave's Golden Treasury was discovered when she was quite young, and she enjoyed it with the peculiar zest of a young and true child of genius. At ten years of age, she had affection for Romeo and Juliet, Rasselas, The Eve of St. Agnes, Wordsworth, Bryant and Tennyson. At thirteen, her verses, heretofore a guarded secret, began to appear in The Granite Monthly, Cottage Hearth, Journal of Education, The Advance, and the Boston Journal. Soon after, she became a student at the Tilton New Hampshire Seminary, 1880–2, where her education, superior to most of her age, was greatly improved by two years of careful work. She then studied music in Boston and New York City, 1883–90.

== Career ==
After several years of music study in Boston, and piano study under her mother's guidance, she taught in Boston, New York, Frankfort, Kentucky, and at the Parkesburg, Pennsylvania Classical Institute. Her repertoire was extensive; Beethoven and Chopin were her especial delight. Indeed, had it not been for her absorbing love for literature she would have chosen the profession of pianist. But the poetry and charm of a quiet life appealed more directly to Poole. Poole was a book reviewer for Town and Country, and the author of Books of Verse.

In June 1895, she published the successful book of verses entitled A Bank of Violets, which secured the favorable consideration of forty reviewers in the United States and England. She received appreciative letters from several of the literati, among them Pierre Loti, Israel Zangwill, and John Gilmer Speed, a grandnephew of John Keats, one of her favorite poets.

== Personal life ==
In 1890 or 1891, she married Allan A. Paul Poole, of London and Boston, a nephew of the English historical painter, Paul Falconer Poole, R. A.

Poole made her home in Roxbury and Dorchester, Massachusetts. She and her children spent some summers near her father's home at Newport, New Hampshire. She died in 1940.

== Selected works ==
=== As Fanny H. Runnells Poole ===
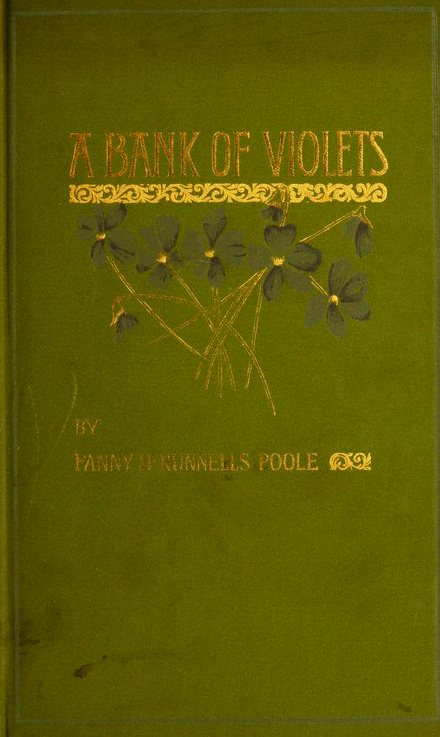
A bank of violets (1895)

- A Bank of Violets : Verses, 1896

=== As Fanny Runnells Poole ===
- Mugen : A Book of Verse, 1907

=== As F. Runnells Poole ===
- A Bank of Violets (verse), 1895; Three Songs of Love (music), 1906; and Mugen (verse), 1908
