= Rick Ladd =

American politician

Rick M. Ladd

Member of the New Hampshire House of Representatives
- Incumbent
- Assumed office December 7, 2022 Serving with Matthew Coulon and Marie Louise Bjelobrk
- Preceded by: Bonnie Ham
- Succeeded by: Greg Mathieson (elect)
- Constituency: Grafton 5th
- In office 2012 – December 7, 2022
- Preceded by: Bob Matheson
- Succeeded by: Heather Baldwin
- Constituency: Grafton 4th
- In office 2008–2012 Serving with Paul Ingbretson
- Succeeded by: Edmond D. Gionet
- Constituency: Grafton 5th

Personal details
- Born: Roderick Merrill Ladd Jr. July 1945 (age 81)
- Party: Republican
- Spouse: Margaret Susie Hodsdon (m. 1968)
- Children: 3
- Education: Vermont Academy; University of Maine (BA); University of Southern Maine (MS)
- Profession: Teacher; principal; politician

Military service
- Allegiance: United States
- Branch/service: United States Army

Roderick Merrill Ladd Jr. is an American politician and retired teacher and school principal. He is a member of the New Hampshire House of Representatives from the Grafton 5th district. As of 2024, he has been elected for nine consecutive terms. He is the chair of the House Education Committee of the New Hampshire House of Representatives. Ladd is a Republican.

== Biography ==
=== Early life and education ===
He attended Vermont Academy, the University of Maine, and the University of Southern Maine. Ladd married Margaret Susie Hodsdon at the Franklin Street Methodist Church in Rumford, Maine, on September 28, 1968. Ladd was stationed at Fort Hood near Killeen, Texas, while an officer in the United States Army.

In 1998, Ladd was named the national distinguished principal of Alaska by the Alaska Council of School Administrators when he was the principal of West Homer Elementary School in Kenai.

=== Political career ===
He was first elected in 2008 after he received the most votes in the general election for the Grafton 5th district in the New Hampshire House of Representatives. Ladd received thirteen more votes than fellow Republican party politician Paul Ingbretson, who was also elected.

Ladd supported Carly Fiorina in the 2016 Republican Party presidential primaries.

In 2024 while an incumbent, he received the most votes in the Republican party primary election for the Grafton 5th district of the New Hampshire House of Representatives. He received the most votes and defeated Rachael Booth and Dustin Vigneault, who both ran uncontested in the Democratic party primary election, in the 2024 general election for the Grafton 5th district. Ladd endorsed Ron DeSantis in the 2024 Republican Party presidential primaries.

He is a member of the New England Board of Higher Education.

== Electoral history ==
New Hampshire House of Representatives general election for the Grafton 5th district, 2024 Source:
Party	Candidate	Votes	%
Republican	Rick Ladd	2,126	31.24
Republican	Marie Louise Bjelobrk	2,088	30.68
Democratic	Rachael Booth	1,375	20.20
Democratic	Dustin Vigneault	1,217	17.88
Total votes		6,806	100

New Hampshire House of Representatives Republican party primary election for the Grafton 5th district, 2024 Source:
Party	Candidate	Votes	%
Republican	Rick Ladd	454	39
Republican	Marie Louise Bjelobrk	411	35
Republican	Greg Mathieson	302	26
Total votes		1,167	100

New Hampshire House of Representatives general election for the Grafton 4th district, 2020 Source:
Party	Candidate	Votes	%
Republican	Rick Ladd	1,405	68.07
Democratic	Don LoCascio	659	31.93
Total votes		2,064	100

New Hampshire House of Representatives general election for the Grafton 5th district, 2008 Source:
Party	Candidate	Votes	%
Republican	Roderick Ladd	1,464	28.03
Republican	Paul Ingbretson	1,451	27.78
Democratic	Charles W. Chandler	1,397	26.75
Democratic	Thomas J. Friel	911	17.44
Total votes		5,223	100
