= Paul I. LaMott =

American politician

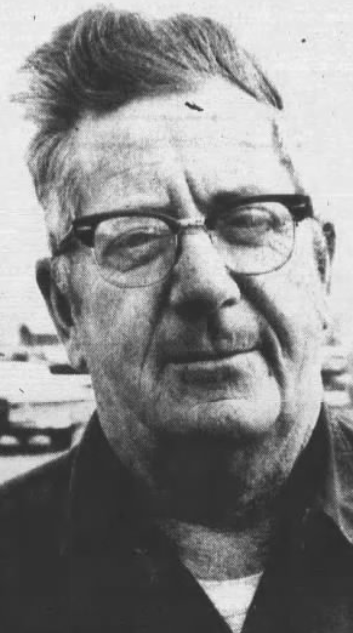
- LaMott in 1981

Member of the New Hampshire House of Representatives
- In office 1961–1963

Member of the New Hampshire House of Representatives from the Grafton 6th district
- In office 1970–1972
- In office 1974–1982

Member of the New Hampshire House of Representatives from the Grafton 5th district
- In office 1982–2000

Personal details
- Born: Paul Irving LaMott; June 20, 1917 Orford, New Hampshire, U.S.
- Died: July 8, 2011 (aged 94) Tilton, New Hampshire, U.S.
- Party: Republican; Democratic

Paul Irving LaMott (June 20, 1917 – July 8, 2011) was an American politician. A member of the Republican Party and the Democratic Party, he served in the New Hampshire House of Representatives from 1961 to 1963, from 1970 to 1972 and from 1974 to 2000.

== Life and career ==
LaMott was born in Orford, New Hampshire, the son of Elwin Albert LaMott and Lela Willis Pike. He attended Woodsville High School, graduating in 1934. After graduating, he served in the United States Army during World War II, which after his discharge, he worked as a mechanical contractor.

LaMott served in the New Hampshire House of Representatives from 1961 to 1963, from 1970 to 1972 and from 1974 to 2000.

== Death ==
LaMott died on July 8, 2011, at the New Hampshire Veterans Home in Tilton, New Hampshire, at the age of 94.
