= Heather Baldwin =

American politician

Member of the New Hampshire House of Representatives from the Grafton 4th district
- Incumbent
- Assumed office December 7, 2022
- Preceded by: Rick Ladd

Personal details
- Party: Democratic

Heather Baldwin is an American politician. She is a member of the New Hampshire House of Representatives from the Grafton 4th district. She is a Democratic party politician.
