= Ann Stone Minot =

American biochemist and physiologist

- Born: April 25, 1894; Woodsville, New Hampshire
- Education: Ph.D.
- Alma mater: Harvard Medical School–Radcliffe College
- Occupations: Medical researcher and instructor

Ann Stone Minot (April 25, 1894 – 1980) was an American biochemist and physiologist.

She was born in Woodsville, New Hampshire, the oldest of six children born to Jonas Minot and Sybil Buck. For their early education, Minot and her siblings attended the Bath Village School, a small three-room schoolhouse. Starting in 1911, Minot matriculated to Smith College with the help of a partial scholarship, where she majored in chemistry and English. She graduated in 1915 with an A.B. degree.

Her first full-time job was as a teacher at Woodsville High School. She was soon hired as a lab assistant at Massachusetts General Hospital, where she remained for five years, acquiring an interest in biochemical and physiological clinical studies. During this period she published eighteen scientific papers, and worked with the biochemical pioneer Willey Denis starting in 1917. In 1920 she returned to school for graduate studies at Radcliffe College, which then functioned as the all-female branch of Harvard College. She investigated lead poisoning for her doctorate, and was awarded a Ph.D. in 1925 with a thesis titled, "Distribution of Lead in the Organism in Acute and Chronic Lead Poisoning".

Following graduation, in 1926 Minot was hired by Dr. Paul D. Lamson as a research associate in the department of pharmacology at Vanderbilt University in Tennessee for a $2,500 annual salary. In 1930 she became an assistant professor of pediatric research at Vanderbilt, investigating the effects of hormones on bone growth and studying fluid balance in infant diarrhea. Her studies led her to an interest in progressive muscle diseases, including myasthenia gravis and muscular dystrophy. In 1938, she became the first to apply guanidine to treat myasthenia gravis. Other topics of research include protein deficiency, Vitamin C deficiency, and tocopherol. She established the Vanderbilt Hospital blood bank in 1940, and it was made her responsibility until 1949 when it was taken over by the Red Cross.

Minot was named associate professor in biochemistry at Vanderbilt in 1943. She remained in pediatric research until 1946, when she became Director of the Clinical Chemistry Lab. In 1948, she was elected to alumni membership of Phi Beta Kappa, Zeta Chapter, for her bone treatment method. Minot was raised to full professorship in 1950, and remained so until 1960 when she retired and was named professor emeritus. She continued as a research associate in endocrinology until finally giving up her research pursuits in 1969 at the age of 75. In total, she published 70 scientific papers. During Minot's career in Nashville, Tennessee, her work has been associated with Meharry Medical College.

Bibliography

- Denis, W.; Minot, A. S. (1917). "The production of creatinuria in normal adults". Journal of Biological Chemistry. 31 (3): 561–566. doi:10.1016/S0021-9258(18)86674-1.
- Denis, W.; Minot, A. S. (1918). "Note on the carbon dioxide content of urine". Journal of Biological Chemistry. 34 (3): 569–575. doi:10.1016/S0021-9258(18)86501-2.
- Denis, W.; Talbot, Fritz B.; Minot, A. S. (1919). "Non-protein nitrogenous constituents of human milk". Journal of Biological Chemistry. 39 (1): 47–51. doi:10.1016/S0021-9258(18)87315-X.
- Denis, W.; Minot, A. S. (1919). "Methods for the quantitative determination of the non-protein nitrogenous constituents of milk". Journal of Biological Chemistry. 37 (3): 353–366. doi:10.1016/S0021-9258(18)87400-2.
- Denis, W.; Minot, A. S. (1919). "The non-protein nitrogenous constituents of cow's milk". Journal of Biological Chemistry. 38 (3): 453–458. doi:10.1016/S0021-9258(18)87333-1.
- Denis, W.; Talbot, F. B.; Minot, A. S. (1919). "A study of the lactose, fat and protein content of women's milk". American Journal of Diseases of Children. 18 (2): 93–100.
- Denis, W.; Minot, A. S. (1919). "A method for determination of minute amounts of lead in urine, feces, and tissues". Journal of Biological Chemistry. 38 (3): 449–452. doi:10.1016/S0021-9258(18)87332-X.
- Reiman, Clarence K.; Minot, Annie S. (1920). "Absorption and elimination of manganese ingested as oxides and silicates". The Journal of Biological Chemistry. 45 (1): 133–143. doi:10.1016/S0021-9258(18)86218-4.
- Reiman, Clarence K.; Minot, Annie S. (1920). "A method for manganese quantitation in biological material together with data on the manganese content of human blood and tissues". Journal of Biological Chemistry. 42 (2): 329–345. doi:10.1016/S0021-9258(18)87150-2.
- Denis, W.; Minot, A. S. (1920). "A study of phosphate retention from the standpoint of blood analysis" (PDF). Archives of Internal Medicine. 26 (1): 99–104. doi:10.1001/archinte.1920.00100010102007.
- Minot, A. S. (1923). "Lead Studies II. A critical note on the electrolytic determination of lead in biological material". Journal of Biological Chemistry. 55 (1): 1–8. doi:10.1016/S0021-9258(18)85691-5.
- Minot, A. S. (1924). "The distribution of lead in the organism after absorption by the gastro-intestinal tract". Journal of Industrial Hygiene. 6: 125–148.
- Aub, J. C.; Minot, A. S.; Fairhall, L. T.; Reznikoff, P. (1924). "Recent investigations of absorption and excretion of lead in the organism". Journal of the American Medical Association. 83 (8): 588–592. doi:10.1001/jama.1924.02660080018005.
- Minot, A. S.; Aub, J. C. (1924). "The distribution of lead in the human organism". Journal of Industrial Hygiene. VI: 149–158.
- Minot, A. S. (1924). "The distribution of lead in the organism after absorption by the lungs and subcutaneous tissue". Journal of Industrial Hygiene. 6: 137.
- Aub, Joseph Charles; Fairhall, Lawrence T.; Minot, Anne S.; Reznikoff, Paul (1926). "Lead poisoning". Medicine Monographs. 7: 265.
- Minot, A. S. (1926). "Distribution of Arsenic in Tumor-Bearing Mice". The Journal of Cancer Research. 10 (3): 293–308.
- Minot, A. S. (1927). "The Relation of Calcium to the Toxicity of Carbon Tetrachloride in Dogs". Proceedings of the Society for Experimental Biology and Medicine. 24 (6): 617–620. doi:10.3181/00379727-24-3491. S2CID 88433449.
- Minot, Ann S.; Cutler, J. T. (1928). "Guanidine retention and calcium reserve as antagonistic factors in carbon tetrachloride and chloroform poisoning". Proceedings of the Society for Experimental Biology and Medicine. 26 (2): 138–140. doi:10.3181/00379727-26-4182. PMC 434759. PMID 16693837.
- Minot, A. S.; Cutler, J. T. (April 1929). "Increase in Guanidine-like Substance in Acute Liver Injury and Eclampsia". Proceedings of the Society for Experimental Biology and Medicine. 26 (7): 607–611. doi:10.3181/00379727-26-4421. S2CID 87528865.
- Minot, A. S.; Cutler, J. T. (1930). "Studies of the response to calcium medication in the hypoglycemia of carbon tetrachloride poisoning". American Journal of Physiology. 93: 674–675.
- Minot, A. S. (October 1931). "The mechanism of the hypoglycemia produced by guanidine and carbon tetrachloride poisoning and its relief by calcium medication". Journal of Pharmacology and Experimental Therapeutics. 43 (2): 295–313. doi:10.1016/S0022-3565(25)08641-0.
- Dodd, Katharine; Minot, A. S.; Casparis, Horton (1932). "Guanidine as a factor in alimentary intoxication in infants". American Journal of Diseases of Children. 43 (1): 1–9.
- Minot, Ann S.; Dodd, Katharine (September 1933). "Guanidine intoxication: a complicating factor in certain clinical conditions in children". American Journal of Diseases of Children. 46 (3): 522–542. doi:10.1001/archpedi.1933.01960030051005.
- Minot, A. S.; Dodd, Katherine; Bryan, Ray (1933). "Chemical action of sodium citrate as a cause of certain transfusion reactions". American Journal of Diseases of Children. 45 (1): 32–40.
- Minot, Ann S.; Dodd, Katharine (1933). "Guanidine intoxication: a complicating factor in certain clinical conditions in children". American Journal of Diseases of Children. 46 (3): 522–542. doi:10.1001/archpedi.1933.01960030051005.
- Dodd, Katharine; Minot, Ann S. (May 1934). "Incidental hyperguanidinemia as a cause of clinical tetany". American Journal of Diseases of Children. 47 (5): 958–962. doi:10.1001/archpedi.1934.01960120016002.
- Minot, A. S.; Dodd, Katharine; Saunders, J. M. (1934). "The acidosis of guanidine intoxication". The Journal of Clinical Investigation. 13 (6): 917–932. doi:10.1172/JCI100636. PMC 436039. PMID 16694259.
- Dodd, Katharine; Minot, A. S.; Keller, M. (April 1936). "Edema in infancy and childhood as an expression of chronic dietary insufficiency". Journal of Pediatrics. 8 (4): 442–451. doi:10.1016/S0022-3476(36)80106-1.
- Dodd, Katharine; Minot, A. S.; Keller, M. (1936). "Edema in infancy and childhood as an expression of chronic dietary insufficiency". Journal of Pediatrics. 8 (4): 442–451. doi:10.1016/S0022-3476(36)80106-1.
- Dodd, Katharine; Minot, A. S.; Keller, M. (1936). "The occurrence of moderately reduced serum albumin in five hundred children in a southern clinic". Journal of Pediatrics. 8 (4): 452–458. doi:10.1016/S0022-3476(36)80107-3.
- Minot, A. S.; Keller, Margaret (1936). "A modification of the Greenberg technic for the colorimetric determination of serum protein". Journal of Laboratory and Clinical Medicine. 21: 743–751.
- Dodd, Katharine; Minot, Ann S.; Arena, Jay M. (June 1937). "Salicylate Poisoning: an Explanation of the more serious manifestations". American Journal of Diseases of Children. 53 (6): 1435–1446. doi:10.1001/archpedi.1937.04140130013002.
- Minot, Ann S.; Keller, Margaret (May 1937). "The circulatory failure associated with guanidine intoxication". Journal of Pharmacology and Experimental Therapeutics. 60 (1): 32–44. doi:10.1016/S0022-3565(25)09845-3.
- Mason, M. F.; Resnik, H.; Minot, A. S.; Rainey, J.; Pilcher, C.; Harrison, T. R. (1937). "Mechanism of experimental uremia". Archives of Internal Medicine. 60 (2): 312–336. doi:10.1001/archinte.1937.00180020136010.
- Minot, Ann S.; Dodd, Katharine; Riven, Samuel S. (April 15, 1938). "The response of the myasthenic state to guanidine hydrochloride". Science. 87 (2259): 348–350. Bibcode:1938Sci....87..348M. doi:10.1126/science.87.2259.348-a. PMID 17743742. S2CID 1137067.
- Minot, Ann S.; Dodd, Katharine; Riven, Samuel S. (August 12, 1939). "Use of guanidine hydrochloride in treatment of myasthenia gravis". Journal of the American Medical Association. 113 (7): 553–559. doi:10.1001/jama.1939.02800320005002.
- Minot, Ann S. (March 1939). "A comparison of the effect of calcium and of atropine and scopolamine on the plasma loss and on the general symptoms of guanidine intoxication". Journal of Pharmacology and Experimental Therapeutics. 65 (3): 243–252. doi:10.1016/S0022-3565(25)08181-9.
- Minot, A. S. (1939). "A comparison of the actions of prostigman and of guanidine on the activity of choline esterase in blood serum". Journal of Pharmacology and Experimental Therapeutics. 66 (4): 453–458. doi:10.1016/S0022-3565(25)08150-9.
- Minot, A. S.; Blalock, Alfred (October 1940). "Plasma loss in severe dehydration, shock and other conditions as affected by therapy". Annals of Surgery. 112 (4): 557–67. doi:10.1097/00000658-194010000-00008. PMC 1388016. PMID 17857664.
- Minot, A. S.; Dodd, Katharine (November 1940). "The correction of distorted fluid equilibrium in the presence of vascular injury". The Journal of Pediatrics. 17 (5): 571–584. doi:10.1016/S0022-3476(40)80129-7.
- Minot, A. S.; Dodd, Katharine; Keller, Margaret; Frank, Helen (1940). "A survey of the state of nutrition with respect to vitamin C in a Southern pediatric clinic". Journal of Pediatrics. 16 (6): 717–728. doi:10.1016/S0022-3476(40)80061-9.
- Minot, A. S.; Frank, Helen E. (February 1941). "Studies of the urinary excretion of guanidine administered orally to normal persons and patients with myasthenia gravis". Journal of Pharmacology and Experimental Therapeutics. 71 (2): 130–137. doi:10.1016/S0022-3565(25)03376-2.
- Keller, M. L.; Minot, A. S. (1941). ""Pot liquor" neglected source of vitamin-C for infants". Southern Medical Journal. 34: 163–164. doi:10.1097/00007611-194102000-00005.
- Minot, Ann S. (1944). "The determination of tocopherol in blood serum". Journal of Laboratory and Clinical Medicine. 29 (4): 772–780. PMID 1715432.
- David, K.; Minot, A. S. (1944). "Hemolytic anemia in infancy: report of a case with demonstration of hemolytic activity of serum". American Journal of Diseases of Children. 68 (5): 327–329. doi:10.1001/archpedi.1944.02020110028006.
- Hunt, John S.; Minot, Ann S. (January 1949). "Hyaluronic acid-hyaluronidase enzyme system in pemphigus". Archives of Dermatology and Syphilology. 59 (1): 114–115. doi:10.1001/archderm.1949.01520260118016. PMID 18110572.
- Minot, A. S.; Grimes, Merwin (October 1949). "The urinary excretion of pentose- and phosphorus-containing complexes in nutritional muscular dystrophy". The Journal of Nutrition. 39 (2): 159–165. doi:10.1093/jn/39.2.159. PMID 15406708.
- Orr, W. F.; Minot, A. S. (April 1952). "Ribosuria: a clinical test for muscular dystrophy". A.M.A. Archives of Neurology & Psychiatry. 67 (4): 483–486. doi:10.1001/archneurpsyc.1952.02320160067007. PMID 14914226.
- Minot, Ann S.; Hillman, J. William (October 1, 1967). "Chemical changes in epiphyseal growth zone of rats induced by excess and lack of estrogen". Proceedings of the Society for Experimental Biology and Medicine. 126 (1): 60–64. doi:10.3181/00379727-126-32367. PMID 5988022. S2CID 31585804.
