= Coos, New Hampshire =

Coos, New Hampshire refers to the frontier area of northern New Hampshire. During the American Revolution a military command was located at Haverhill, New Hampshire to protect the New Hampshire Grants and to support military efforts in the invasion of Canada.

The name was later given to a portion of northern Grafton County in 1803 when a new county, named Coos, was created.

The location was originally a name associated with a part of the migratory Abenaki tribe. The location was known before 1704 to have military significance for several provincial governments and the leaders in New France.

In 1755, a Fort Wentworth was to be constructed by Rogers' Rangers at the junction of the Upper Ammonoosuc River with the Connecticut River in present-day Northumberland, New Hampshire. A river with a similar name, the Ammonoosuc River, flows through Grafton County, joining the Connecticut opposite Newbury, Vermont. The upper Coos refers to the area around Lancaster, New Hampshire, the county seat of Coos County, and the lower Coos to Newbury, Vermont. The distance between these locations is approximately 40 miles (64 km).
