= Jeduthun Wilcox =

American politician

Member of the U.S. House of Representatives from New Hampshire's At-large district
- In office March 4, 1813 – March 3, 1817
- Preceded by: new seat
- Succeeded by: John Parrot

Member of the New Hampshire House of Representatives
- In office 1809–1811

Personal details
- Born: November 18, 1768 Middletown, Connecticut Colony, British America
- Died: July 18, 1838 (aged 69) Orford, New Hampshire, U.S.
- Party: Federalist Party
- Spouse: Elisabeth Todd Wilcox
- Children: Leonard Wilcox; Sarah Fisk Wilcox Hinckley
- Profession: Lawyer; Politician; Farmer

Jeduthun Wilcox (November 18, 1768 – July 18, 1838) was an American politician and a United States representative from New Hampshire.

== Early life ==
Born in Middletown in the Connecticut Colony, Wilcox studied law with Benjamin A. Gilbert; was admitted to the bar in 1802 and commenced practice in Orford Grafton County, New Hampshire.

== Career ==
Wilcox served as member of the New Hampshire House of Representatives from 1809 to 1811.

Elected as a Federalist to the Thirteenth and Fourteenth Congresses, Wilcox served as United States Representative for the state of New Hampshire (March 4, 1813 – March 3, 1817).

== Death ==
Wilcox died in Orford, New Hampshire, on July 18, 1838.

== Family life ==
The son of John and Eunice Wilcox, he married Sarah Fisk and they had a son, Leonard Wilcox, who served as a United States senator from New Hampshire. After Sarah's death, he married Elisabeth Todd and had six daughters.

U.S. House of Representatives
Preceded by new seat	New Hampshire At-large seat six 1813—1817	Succeeded by John Parrott
