= Oliverian School =

Coordinates: 44°01′42″N 71°58′58″W

The Oliverian School
- 28 Becket Drive; Pike, New Hampshire 03780; United States

Information
- School type: Private preparatory boarding school
- Motto: A place to find your place.
- Denomination: Non-denominational
- Founded: 2003
- Status: Open
- CEEB code: 300251
- Head of school: Abby Hood
- Faculty: 30
- Grades: 9-12 and post grad
- Gender: Co-educational
- Enrollment: 30 - 40 students
- Average class size: 4-8
- Student to teacher ratio: 1.3:1
- Campus size: 1,800 acres (7.3 km^{2})
- Campus type: Rural
- Colors: Lost Golfer Green, Canadian Tuxedo Blue, Bucolic Green, Beyond the Stars Blue
- Affiliation: NATSAP; Independent School Association of Northern New England
- Website: www.oliverianschool.org

The Oliverian School is an independent alternative boarding school in the Pike section of the town of Haverhill, New Hampshire, United States, serving students from 9th to 12th grade and founded in 2003 by Barclay Mackinnon. Oliverian is a small school designed for students who have had difficulty with education in more traditional settings. The school is coeducational, with approximately 36 students roughly equally split between boys and girls who are housed in single-sex converted-farmhouse dormitories located on the main and east areas of the campus. Each dorm residence is supervised by a designated dormitory parent. Oliverian is inclusive to LGBTQIA+ students and faculty and permits transgender students to live in their preferred dormitory.

The campus is on the western edge of the White Mountains of New Hampshire and is part of a 2,000-acre (810 ha) recreational preserve, providing access to outdoor sports and cultural resources. The academic curriculum is supported by the three pillar areas of learning: adventure, arts, and stewardship. With an average class size of about five students, Oliverian maintains a 1.3-to-1 ratio between students and faculty. Over 90% of graduates matriculate directly to college or university.

The school is a member of the New England Association of Schools and Colleges (NEASC), the National Association of Independent Schools (NAIS), and the Association of Independent Schools in New England (AISNE).

The Oliverian School maintains and is active on multiple Social media platforms, including Instagram, Facebook, LinkedIn, YouTube, and Twitter.
