= Bedell Bridge State Park =

State park in Grafton County, New Hampshire

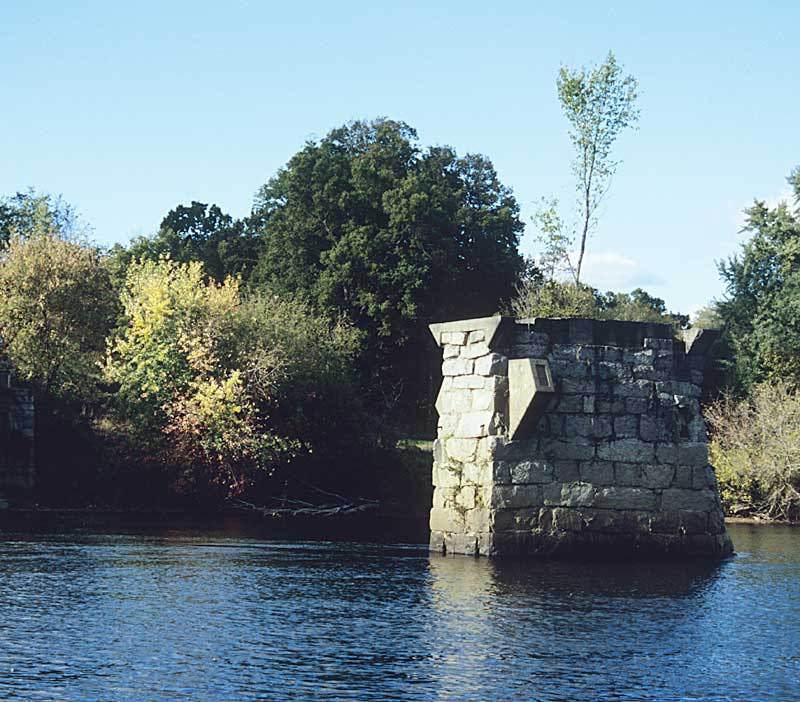

- Location within New Hampshire
- Interactive map of Bedell Bridge State Park
- Location: Haverhill, New Hampshire, United States
- Coordinates: 44°02′42″N 72°04′23″W
- Area: 74 acres (30 ha)
- Elevation: 384 feet (117 m)
- Established: 1970
- Administrator: New Hampshire Division of Parks and Recreation
- Website: Official website
- New Hampshire State Parks

Bedell Bridge State Park, also known as Bedell Bridge State Historic Site, is a 74-acre (30 ha) state park located in Haverhill, New Hampshire, on the Connecticut River. It is open year-round and offers walking, picnicking, non-motorized boating, and fishing. A Fish and Game boat launch is located within the park.

== History ==
The property is the site of the former Bedell Covered Bridge, which was the second-longest covered bridge in the United States, (Note: See Cornish–Windsor Covered Bridge.) until its destruction by wind in 1979. The bridge's stone piers still remain in the river. The bridge formerly connected Haverhill to Newbury, Vermont.
