= Greg Mathieson =

American politician

Member-elect of the New Hampshire House of Representatives from the Grafton 5th district
- Assuming office December 2026
- Succeeding: Rick Ladd

Personal details
- Party: Republican

Greg Mathieson is an American politician. A member of the Republican Party, he is the member-elect for the Grafton 5th district of the New Hampshire House of Representatives.
