= Leonard Wilcox =

American politician

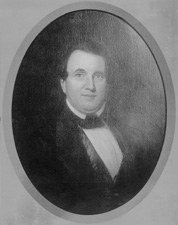

United States Senator from New Hampshire
- In office March 1, 1842 – March 3, 1843
- Preceded by: Franklin Pierce
- Succeeded by: Charles G. Atherton

Judge of the New Hampshire Superior Court
- In office 1838–1840
- Preceded by: Joel Parker
- Succeeded by: Andrew Salter Woods

Member of the New Hampshire House of Representatives
- In office 1828–1834

Personal details
- Born: January 29, 1799 Hanover, New Hampshire
- Died: June 18, 1850 (aged 51) Orford, New Hampshire
- Resting place: West Congregational Churchyard; Orford, New Hampshire.
- Party: Democratic
- Spouse(s): Almira Morey Wilcox; Mary Mann Wilcox
- Relations: Jeduthun Wilcox; Samuel Morey
- Children: Samuel M. Wilcox; Martha Wilcox Woodward
- Profession: Lawyer; Jedge; Politician

Leonard Wilcox (January 29, 1799 – June 18, 1850) was an American lawyer, judge and politician. He served as a United States senator from New Hampshire, as judge of the New Hampshire Superior Court, and as a member of the New Hampshire House of Representatives during the 1800s.

== Early life ==
Born in Hanover, New Hampshire, Wilcox was the son of Jeduthun Wilcox and Sarah (Fisk) Wilcox. His father was a United States representative from New Hampshire during the 13th and 14th United States Congresses.

He graduated from Dartmouth College in 1817 and was a member of Phi Beta Kappa society. After graduation, he studied law and was admitted to the bar in 1820. He began the practice of law in Orford in Grafton County.

== Career ==
He served as a member of the New Hampshire House of Representatives from 1828 to 1834, was judge of the New Hampshire Superior Court from 1838 to 1840, and as bank commissioner from 1838 to 1842. Appointed by Governor Page as a Democrat to the United States Senate to fill the vacancy caused by the resignation of Franklin Pierce, Wilcox was subsequently elected and served from March 1, 1842 to March 3, 1843. After leaving the Senate, he resumed the practice of law.

He served as judge of the Court of Common Pleas from 1847 to 1848, and was again appointed judge of the superior court in 1848, serving until his death.

== Death ==
Wilcox died in Orford, Grafton County, New Hampshire, on June 18, 1850 (age 51 years, 140 days). He is interred at West Congregational Churchyard in Orford, New Hampshire.

== Personal life ==
On September 12, 1819, he married Almira Morey, daughter of inventor Samuel Morey. Following Almira's death, Wilcox married Mary Mann on October 10, 1833. He had children from both marriages.

U.S. Senate
Preceded by Franklin Pierce	U.S. senator (Class 3) from New Hampshire; March 1, 1842 – March 3, 1843; Served alongside: Levi Woodbury	Succeeded by Charles G. Atherton
