= Matthew Coulon =

American politician

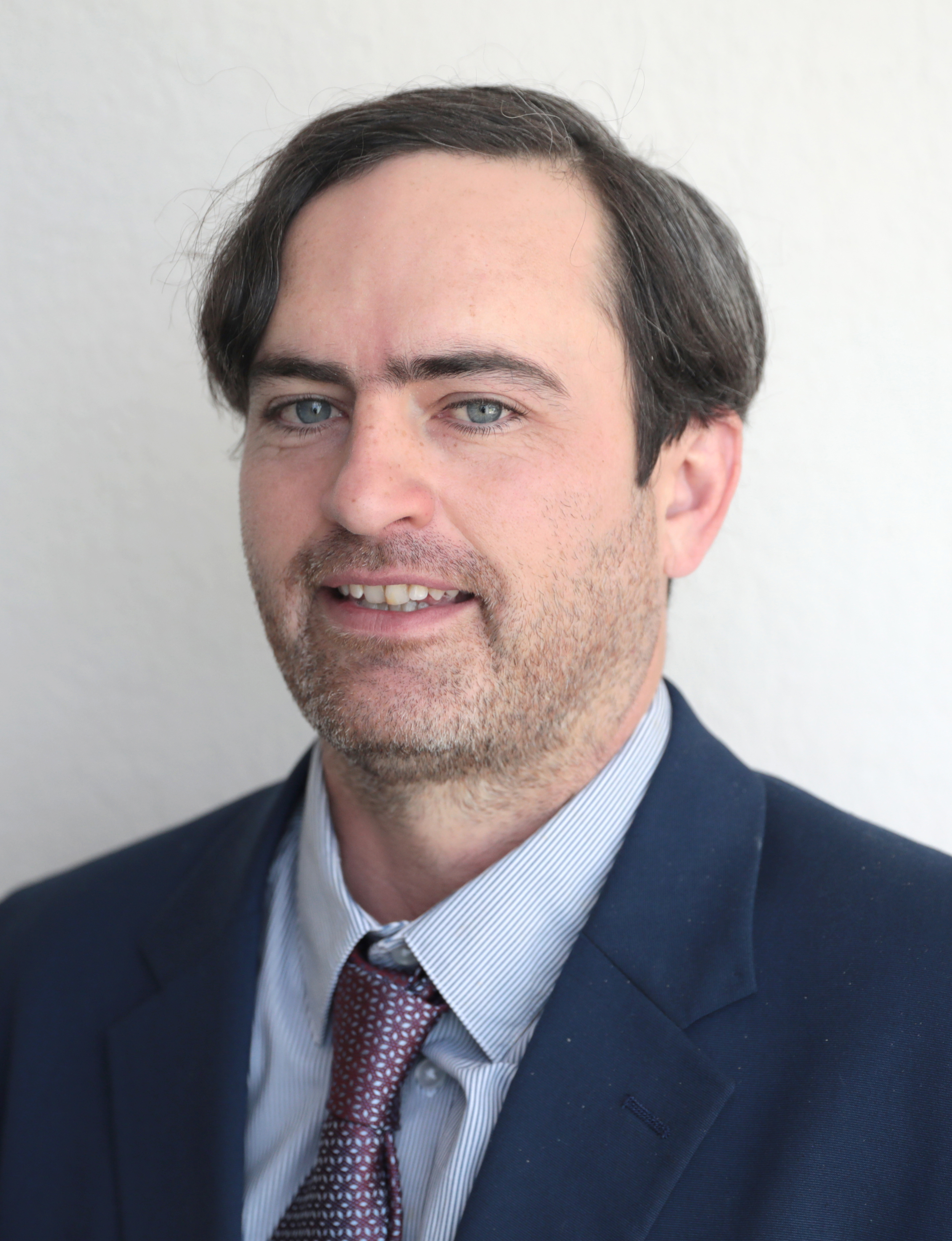

Member of the New Hampshire House of Representatives from the Grafton 5th district
- In office December 7, 2022 – 2024 Serving with Rick Ladd
- Preceded by: Bonnie Ham
- Succeeded by: Marie Louise Bjelobrk

Personal details
- Party: Republican

Matthew Coulon is an American politician. A member of the Republican Party, he formerly represented the Grafton 5th district in the New Hampshire House of Representatives from 2022 to 2024. He assumed office on December 7, 2022, did not run for re-election, and was succeeded by Marie Louise Bjelobrk in 2024.
