= Bob Smith (pitcher, born 1931) =

American baseball player (1931–2013)

- Pitcher
- Born: February 1, 1931; Woodsville, New Hampshire, U.S.
- Died: April 1, 2013 (aged 82); Augusta, Georgia, U.S.
- Batted: Right Threw: Left

MLB debut
- April 29, 1955, for the Boston Red Sox

Last MLB appearance
- September 23, 1959, for the Detroit Tigers

MLB statistics
- Win–loss record: 4–9
- Earned run average: 4.05
- Strikeouts: 93
- Stats at Baseball Reference

Teams
- Boston Red Sox (1955); St. Louis Cardinals (1957); Pittsburgh Pirates (1957–1959); Detroit Tigers (1959)

Robert Gilchrist Smith (February 1, 1931 – April 1, 2013) was an American professional baseball player, a left-handed pitcher who played for the Boston Red Sox, St. Louis Cardinals, Pittsburgh Pirates and Detroit Tigers of Major League Baseball in all or part of four seasons spanning 1955 through 1959. Born in Woodsville, a village of Haverhill, New Hampshire, he was listed as 6 feet 1 inch (1.85 m) tall and 190 pounds (86 kg).

Smith's played minor and major league baseball for 15 years (1948–51; 1954–64), interrupted by military service during the Korean War. Signed originally by the Red Sox, he made Boston's early-season roster in 1955, and appeared in one game in relief on April 29 against the Chicago White Sox. Summoned in the sixth inning with one out and two men on base and Chicago already in the lead, 5–0, Smith surrendered a base on balls to Nellie Fox and a two-run single to Minnie Miñoso before retiring the side; he then pitched a scoreless seventh inning. It would be his only appearance in a Red Sox uniform.

After spending the remainder of 1955 and all of 1956 at the top level of minor league baseball, Smith was drafted out of the Red Sox organization by St. Louis in the 1956 Rule 5 lottery. He worked in six games as a relief pitcher for the Cardinals during the early weeks of 1957 before being sold to the Pirates at the May cutdown. Smith remained with Pittsburgh for the rest of that season. Thrust into a starting role late in the year, he threw a complete game, eight-hit victory over the Philadelphia Phillies on September 8. He then played another full year, 1958, for the Pirates. Smith began the year in the starting rotation, but was winless in his first three appearances. Sent to the bullpen, he was given only one other start for the rest of the year. Smith then worked 20 more games in relief for the 1959 Pirates before he was released on waivers to the Tigers in mid-June. Detroit used him in only nine games in relief, where he was ineffective, and sent him to Triple-A Charleston for part of the season, his last in the majors.

Smith played another five years at the Triple-A level before his retirement at age 33. As a big leaguer, he worked in 91 games pitched, 83 in relief, and won four of 13 decisions (.308), with two saves. In 1662/3 innings pitched, Smith allowed 174 hits and 83 bases on balls. He struck out 93 and registered two complete games. All of his victories, saves and complete games came as a Pirate.

Smith's career coincided with that of another left-handed pitcher named Bob Smith, nicknamed "Riverboat", who also came through the Red Sox' system. The two Bob Smiths were intermittent teammates in the Boston organization during 1951, 1955 and 1956.
