= Chad Paronto =

American baseball player (born 1975)

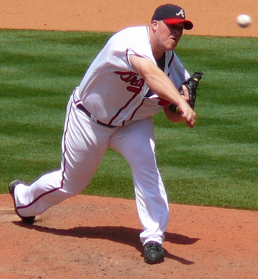
- Paronto pitching for the Atlanta Braves in 2007
- Pitcher
- Born: July 28, 1975 (age 50); Woodsville, New Hampshire, U.S.
- Batted: Right Threw: Right

MLB debut
- April 19, 2001, for the Baltimore Orioles

Last MLB appearance
- September 29, 2009, for the Houston Astros

MLB statistics
- Win–loss record: 6–12
- Earned run average: 4.32
- Strikeouts: 107
- Stats at Baseball Reference

Teams
- Baltimore Orioles (2001); Cleveland Indians (2002–2003); Atlanta Braves (2006–2007); Houston Astros (2008–2009)

Chad Michael Paronto (born July 28, 1975) is an American former Major League Baseball player. Paronto attended the University of Massachusetts Amherst before being drafted by the Baltimore Orioles in the eighth round of the 1996 Major League Baseball draft. Paronto's best pitches included a 90–94 mph fastball and a heavy sinker which he used mainly with men on base.

== Early life ==
Paronto attended Woodsville High School in Woodsville, New Hampshire and was a letterman in soccer, baseball, and basketball. In basketball, he won All-State honors and scored more than 1,000 points during his high school career. In baseball, he won All-State honors and was named the New Hampshire Player of the Year. Paronto graduated from Woodsville High School in 1993.

== Professional career ==
=== Baltimore Orioles ===
In his debut year with the Orioles, Paronto went 1–3 with a 5.00 earned run average (ERA) and 16 strikeouts in 24 games.

=== Cleveland Indians ===
On November 19, 2001, Paronto was claimed off waivers by the Cleveland Indians.

Paronto had a decent year in 2002 with Cleveland, compiling an 0–2 record, and a 4.04 ERA and 23 strikeouts. After going 0–2 with a 9.45 ERA and six strikeouts in 6 2/3 innings pitched.

=== St. Louis Cardinals ===
Paronto became a free agent in the 2003 off-season and signed with the St. Louis Cardinals. He never made it to the Major Leagues with the Cardinals.

=== Milwaukee Brewers ===
Paronto signed as a free agent with the Milwaukee Brewers in December 2004.

Paronto began the 2005 season with the Triple-A affiliate of the Brewers, the Nashville Sounds. With the Sounds, he went 3–1 with a 2.75 ERA and four saves in 27 relief appearances. However, Paronto was released by Milwaukee on June 17.

=== Atlanta Braves ===
Paronto signed with the Atlanta Braves on June 21, 2005, and was assigned to the Triple-A Richmond Braves.

On May 9, 2006, the Braves called Paronto back up to the Majors. He finished the season with a 2–3 record and a 3.18 ERA. In his first four appearances with Atlanta, he allowed one run.

On Opening Day 2007, Paronto recorded his first career save in a 5–3 extra-inning victory over the Phillies. On July 31, Paronto was optioned to Triple-A Richmond to make room on the roster for newly acquired first baseman Mark Teixeira. He finished the season with a 3–1 record and 3.57 ERA. On October 25, the Braves designated Paronto for assignment. Paronto refused an assignment to Triple-A and became a free agent.

=== Houston Astros ===
On December 18, 2007, he signed with the Houston Astros. On March 28, 2008, he was sent outright to the minors. He was called up to the majors on July 6, 2008, but was designated for assignment on July 31. He became a free agent after the season.

Paronto was re-signed to a minor league contract with the Astros on January 14, 2009, and was invited to spring training. Paronto's contract was purchased from Triple-A Round Rock on July 17, 2009.

=== Boston Red Sox ===
On January 20, 2010, Paronto signed a minor league contract with the Boston Red Sox.

=== Pittsfield Colonials ===
Paronto pitched for the Pittsfield Colonials of the Can-Am League in 2011, his final professional season.
