= Orford, New Hampshire =

- Town
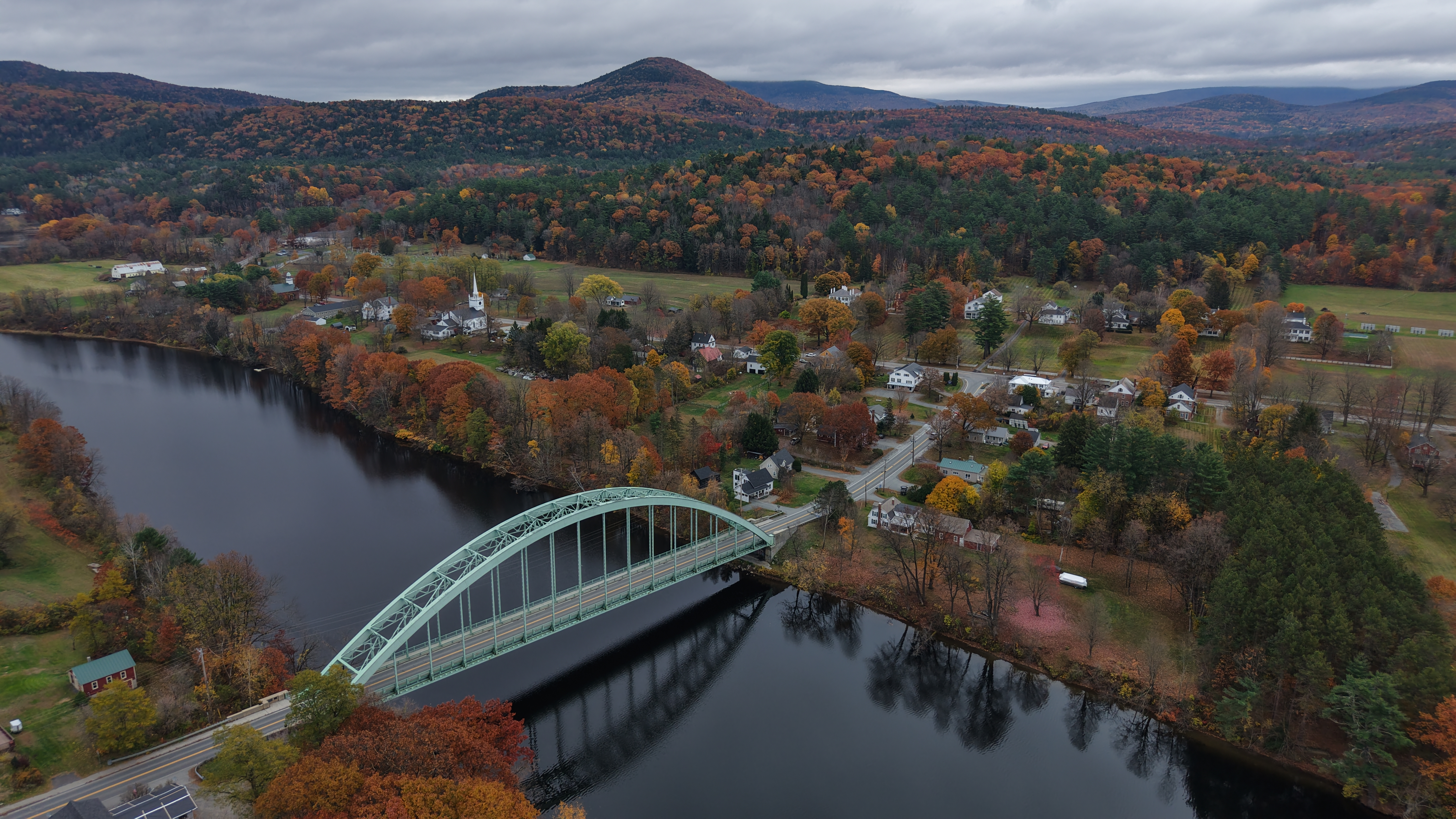
- Orford, NH, from the west

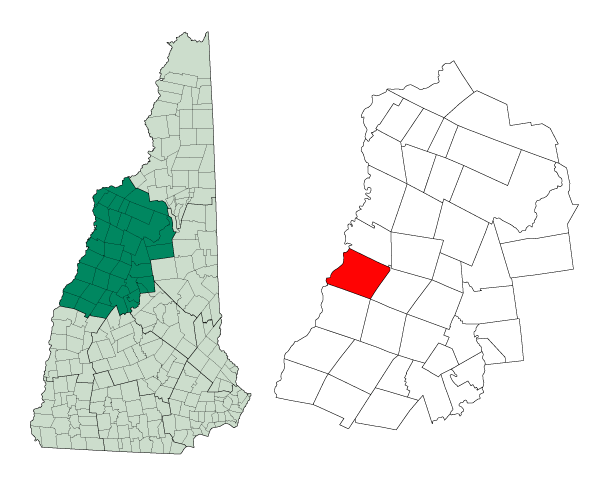
- Location in Grafton County, New Hampshire
- Coordinates: 43°53′30″N 72°03′31″W
- Country: United States
- State: New Hampshire
- County: Grafton
- Incorporated: 1761
- Villages: Orford; Orfordville

Area
  - Total: 47.9 sq mi (124.1 km^{2})
  - Land: 46.5 sq mi (120.4 km^{2})
  - Water: 1.4 sq mi (3.6 km^{2}) 2.93%
- Elevation: 1,158 ft (353 m)

Population (2020)
  - Total: 1,237
  - Density: 27/sq mi (10.3/km^{2})
- Time zone: UTC-5 (Eastern)
  - Summer (DST): UTC-4 (Eastern)
- ZIP code: 03777
- Area code: 603
- FIPS code: 33-58500
- GNIS feature ID: 873693
- Website: www.orfordnh.us

Orford is a town in Grafton County, New Hampshire, United States. The population was 1,237 at the 2020 census, unchanged from the 2010 census. The Appalachian Trail crosses in the east.

== History ==
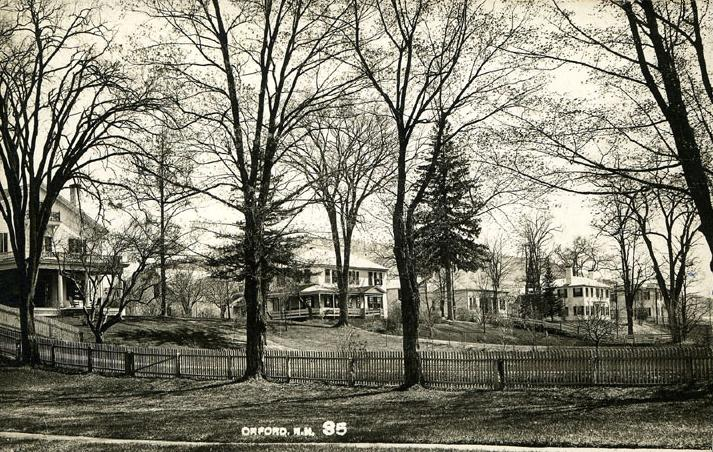
The Ridge c. 1912

First called "Number Seven" in a line of Connecticut River fort towns, Orford was incorporated in 1761 by Governor Benning Wentworth and named for Robert Walpole, Earl of Orford, who was the first prime minister of Great Britain. The town was settled in 1765 by Daniel Cross and wife from Lebanon, Connecticut. By 1859, it had 1,406 inhabitants, most involved in agriculture. There was a large tannery, a chair factory, ten sawmills, a starch factory, a gristmill, a sash, blind and door factory, and two boot and shoe factories.

An original grantee was General Israel Morey, whose son Samuel Morey discovered a way to separate hydrogen from oxygen in water, making possible the first marine steam engine. He recognized the potential of steam power after working at his father's ferry. In 1793, on the river at Orford, he was first to demonstrate the use of a paddlewheel to propel a steam boat.

Author Washington Irving visited Orford in 1832 and is quoted as saying, "In all my travels in this country and in Europe, I have seen no village more beautiful than this. It is a charming place—nature has done her utmost here." Of the famous sequence of seven early homes built on The Ridge, Dartmouth Professor of Architecture Hugh Morrison said, "As a row and counting the setting, this is the finest group of Federal-style houses in the United States." Built between 1773 and 1839, the dwellings show the influence of architect Asher Benjamin.

== Geography ==
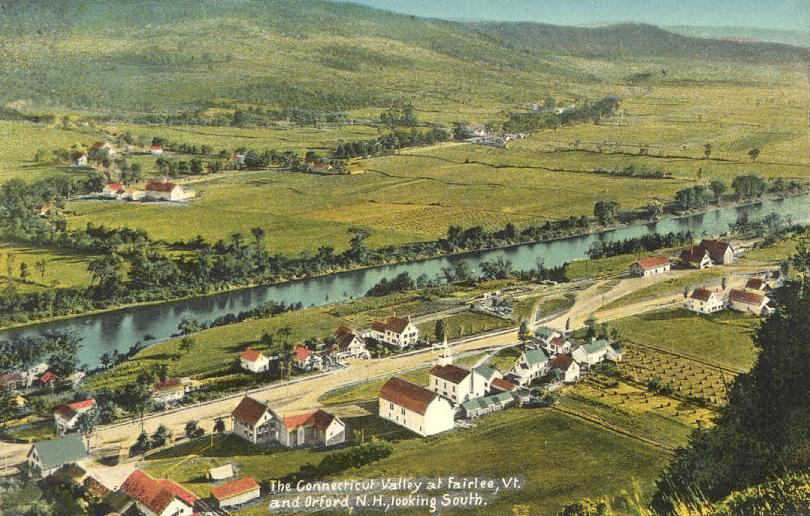
Connecticut River Valley c. 1907, with Orford from Fairlee, Vermont

According to the United States Census Bureau, the town has a total area of 47.9 square miles (124.1 km^{2}), of which 46.5 square miles (120.4 km^{2}) are land and 1.4 square miles (3.6 km^{2}) are water, comprising 2.93% of the town. The Connecticut River, which serves as the boundary between New Hampshire and Vermont, forms the western edge of the town. Most of Orford is drained by Jacobs Brook and other small tributaries of the Connecticut. The northeastern corner of the town, around Upper and Lower Baker Ponds, drains via the Baker River and Pemigewasset River into the Merrimack River.

The town has two population centers. The main village of Orford, with the town's schools and post office, is located on New Hampshire Route 10 along the banks of the Connecticut River. The town hall, however, is located in the smaller village of Orfordville, on New Hampshire Route 25A several miles east of the river.

The highest point in Orford is the summit of Mount Cube, at 2,909 feet (887 m) above sea level, in the eastern part of town. The northern slopes of Smarts Mountain, whose 3,240-foot (990 m) summit lies in the neighboring town of Lyme, occupy the southeastern corner of town.

Camps Merriwood and Moosilauke are situated on Upper Baker Pond in Orford.

== Demographics ==
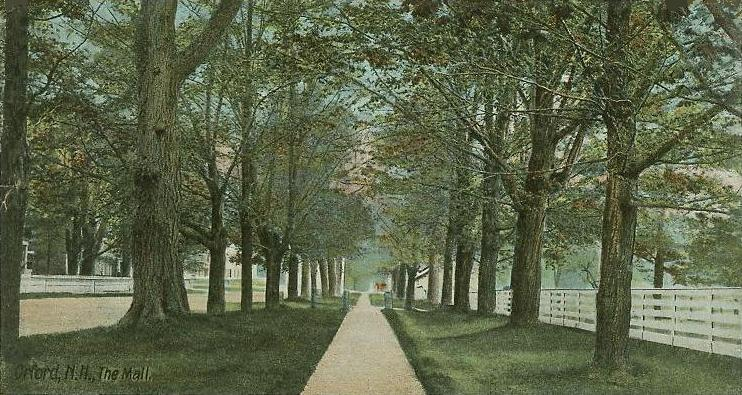
The Mall c. 1906

Historical population
Census	Pop.	Note	%±
1790	540		—
1800	988		83.0%
1810	1,265		28.0%
1820	1,568		24.0%
1830	1,829		16.6%
1840	1,707		−6.7%
1850	1,406		−17.6%
1860	1,255		−10.7%
1870	1,119		−10.8%
1880	1,050		−6.2%
1890	916		−12.8%
1900	890		−2.8%
1910	799		−10.2%
1920	661		−17.3%
1930	636		−3.8%
1940	701		10.2%
1950	726		3.6%
1960	667		−8.1%
1970	793		18.9%
1980	928		17.0%
1990	1,008		8.6%
2000	1,091		8.2%
2010	1,237		13.4%
2020	1,237		0.0%
U.S. Decennial Census

As of the census of 2000, there were 1,091 people, 470 households, and 308 families residing in the town. The population density was 23.4 people per square mile (9.0/km^{2}). There were 561 housing units at an average density of 12.0 per square mile (4.6/km^{2}). The racial makeup of the town was 96.98% White, 0.09% African American, 0.27% Native American, 0.64% Asian, 1.10% from other races, and 0.92% from two or more races. Hispanic or Latino of any race were 0.92% of the population.

There were 470 households, out of which 26.6% had children under the age of 18 living with them, 55.5% were married couples living together, 7.0% had a female householder with no husband present, and 34.3% were non-families. 27.4% of all households were made up of individuals, and 9.1% had someone living alone who was 65 years of age or older. The average household size was 2.32 and the average family size was 2.84.

In the town, the population was spread out, with 21.9% under the age of 18, 6.3% from 18 to 24, 29.8% from 25 to 44, 29.0% from 45 to 64, and 13.0% who were 65 years of age or older. The median age was 40 years. For every 100 females, there were 95.2 males. For every 100 females age 18 and over, there were 94.5 males.

The median income for a household in the town was $46,250, and the median income for a family was $50,577. Males had a median income of $27,500 versus $25,833 for females. The per capita income for the town was $24,196. About 3.1% of families and 5.5% of the population were below the poverty line, including 7.4% of those under age 18 and 4.1% of those age 65 or over.

== Crime ==
In the winter of 2011, Orford experienced a rash of street sign theft, at one point leaving the town with only six signs remaining. With an addition of a new police officer, 66 of the signs were recovered and two of the thieves admitted to stealing the signs.

== Education ==
It is in the Rivendell Interstate School District.

== Notable people ==
- Deborah Arnie Arnesen (born 1953), NH gubernatorial candidate, commentator
- Daniel Doan (1914–1993), hiking enthusiast, writer
- Milton Friedman (1912–2006), Nobel Prize-winning economist
- Charles R. Jackson (1903–1968), writer
- Paul I. LaMott (1917–2011), politician
- Ben Lovejoy (born 1984), defenseman with the Pittsburgh Penguins
- Gilman Marston (1811–1890), US senator, congressman, and US Army general
- Samuel Morey (1762–1843), inventor
- Jameson Parker (born 1947), actor
- Fanny Huntington Runnells Poole (1863–1940), writer, book reviewer
- Meldrim Thomson, Jr. (1912–2001), 73rd governor of New Hampshire
- Jeduthun Wilcox (1768–1838), US congressman
- Leonard Wilcox (1799–1850), US senator
