= Jerry Stringham =

American politician

Member of the New Hampshire House of Representatives from the Grafton 3rd district
- Incumbent
- Assumed office December 7, 2022

Personal details
- Party: Democratic
- Education: Massachusetts Institute of Technology (BS); Harvard Business School (MBA)

Jerry Stringham is an American politician. He serves as a Democratic member for the Grafton 3rd district of the New Hampshire House of Representatives.
