= Woodsville, New Hampshire =

Census-designated place in New Hampshire, United States

- Census-designated place
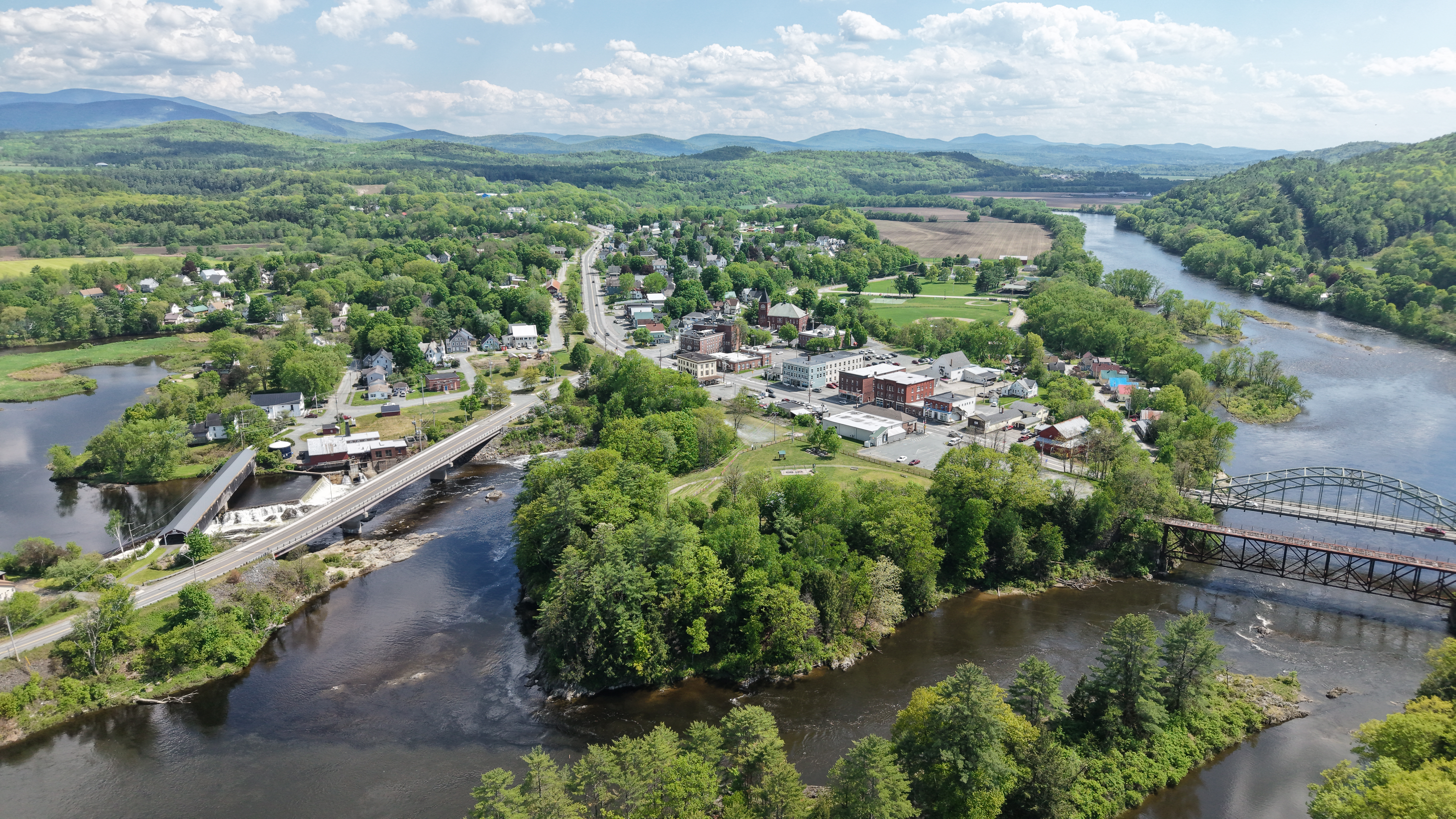
- Woodsville, New Hampshire, from the north

- Location within New Hampshire Location within the United States
- Coordinates: 44°08′33″N 72°01′32″W
- Country: United States
- State: New Hampshire
- County: Grafton
- Town: Haverhill

Area
  - Total: 1.88 sq mi (4.86 km^{2})
  - Land: 1.85 sq mi (4.79 km^{2})
  - Water: 0.027 sq mi (0.07 km^{2})
- Elevation: 518 ft (158 m)

Population (2020)
  - Total: 1,431
  - Density: 773.6/sq mi (298.68/km^{2})
- Time zone: UTC-5 (Eastern (EST))
  - Summer (DST): UTC-4 (EDT)
- ZIP code: 03785
- Area code: 603
- FIPS code: 33-87140
- GNIS feature ID: 2378099

Woodsville is a census-designated place (CDP) and the largest village in the town of Haverhill, New Hampshire, United States, along the Connecticut River at the mouth of the Ammonoosuc River. The population was 1,431 at the 2020 census. Although North Haverhill is now the county seat of Grafton County, the village of Woodsville has traditionally been considered the county seat, as the county courthouse was originally located there. The county buildings are now located halfway between Woodsville and the village of North Haverhill to the south.

== History ==
Woodsville was named for John L. Woods, a figure in its early development. He arrived from Wells River, Vermont, a village across the Connecticut River narrows in Newbury, and in 1829 purchased a sawmill which had been operating on the Ammonoosuc River since 1811. He manufactured pine lumber, and opened a store in his house. Spring snowmelt carried log drives down the Connecticut and Ammonoosuc rivers. A log boom was built across the Connecticut River to Wells River to hold the logs briefly for sorting. Logs not destined for Woods' mill were released gradually to avoid jams in the Ox Bow meadow downstream. Log drivers detailed to work at the boom enjoyed Woodsville's saloons and red-light district.

The Boston, Concord & Montreal Railroad opened at Woodsville in 1853 and built its division offices and a branch repair shop. It replaced the original 1805 bridge between the states with a two-level span, featuring a toll highway below and railroad tracks on the roof. The village boomed into an important railway town and junction, endowed with fine examples of Victorian architecture. It also became a center for legal affairs. The log drives were stopped after 1915, when pleasure boat owners complained about the hazards to navigation. In 1889, the Grafton County Court moved from Haverhill Corner to Woodsville, where it remained until moving halfway to North Haverhill in 1972.

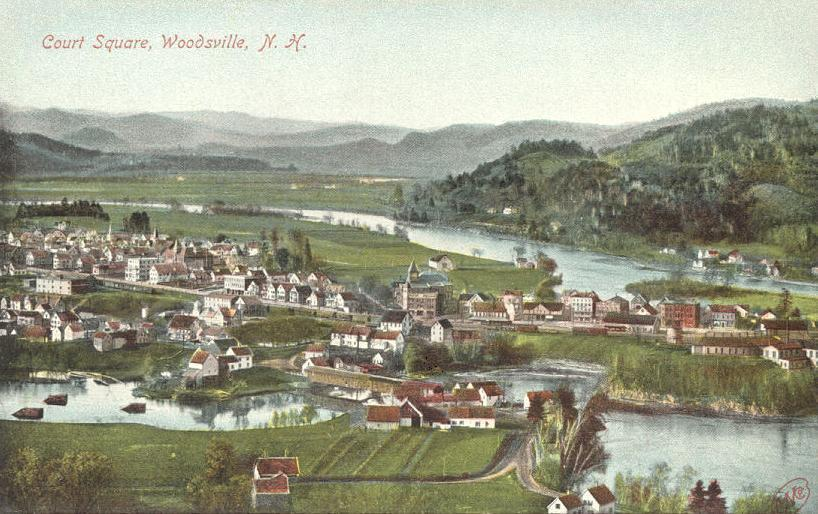
Bird's-eye view in 1908

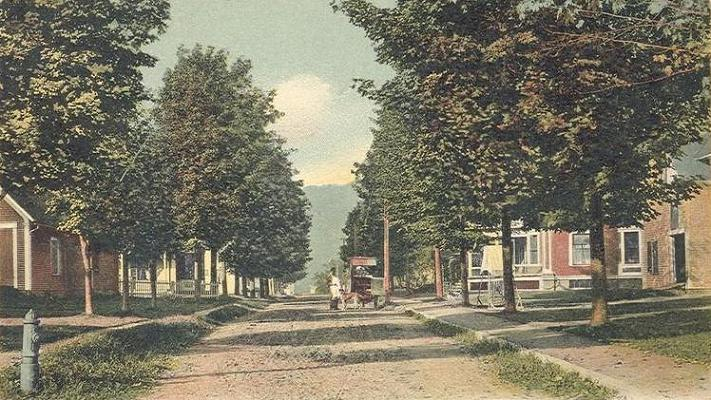
Maple Street in 1906

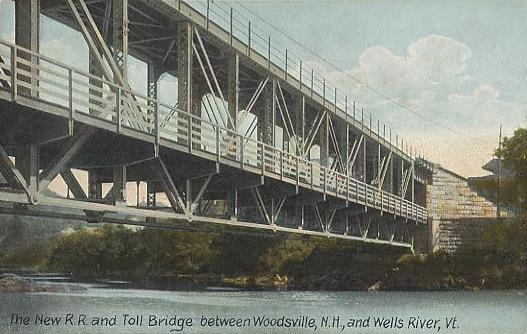
Railroad bridge c. 1906

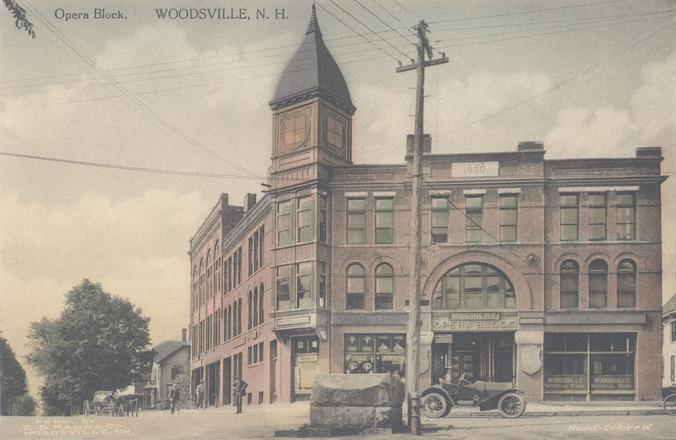
Opera Block c. 1915

== Geography ==
Woodsville is in the northwest corner of the town of Haverhill, bordered to the north by the town of Bath and to the west by the Connecticut River, which forms the state border with Vermont. According to the United States Census Bureau, the CDP has a total area of 1.9 square miles (4.9 km^{2}), of which 1.9 square miles (4.8 km^{2}) are land and 0.04 square miles (0.1 km^{2}), or 1.46%, are water. The Ammonoosuc River runs just north of the CDP and reaches its confluence with the Connecticut River at the northernmost point in the community.

Woodsville is crossed by U.S. Route 302 and by state routes 10 and 135. US 302 leads northeast 21 miles (34 km) to Littleton and west across the Connecticut River to Wells River, Vermont, and 3 miles (5 km) to Interstate 91. Route 10 leads south from Woodsville 37 miles (60 km) to Hanover, and Route 135 leads north 20 miles (32 km) to Interstate 93 northwest of Littleton.

Woodsville serves as the commercial center for the town of Haverhill and the surrounding communities, including several just to the west in Vermont. Many of the town's commercial businesses, including supermarkets, sit-down and fast-food restaurants, and banks, are located near the junction of US 302 and NH 10. Cottage Hospital, a critical-access hospital serving the area, is also located in Woodsville.

== Demographics ==
Historical population
Census	Pop.	Note	%±
1950	1,542		—
1960	1,596		3.5%
1970	1,336		−16.3%
1980	1,195		−10.6%
1990	1,122		−6.1%
2000	1,081		−3.7%
2010	1,126		4.2%
2020	1,431		27.1%
U.S. Decennial Census

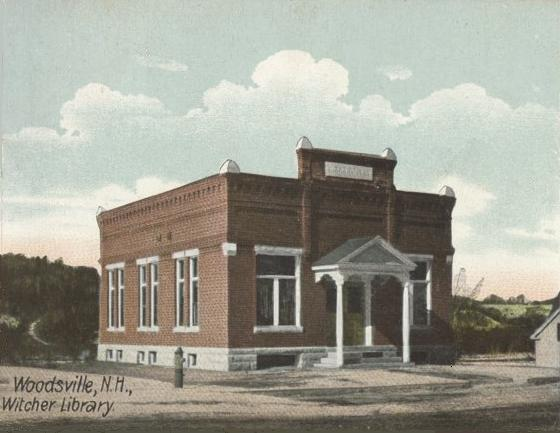
Free Public Library in 1907

As of the census of 2010, there were 1,126 people, 482 households, and 293 families residing in the CDP. There were 558 housing units, of which 76, or 13.6%, were vacant. The racial makeup of the CDP was 96.5% white, 0.2% African American, 0.5% Native American, 1.5% Asian, 0.1% Pacific Islander, 0.3% some other race, and 1.9% from two or more races. 1.2% of the population were Hispanic or Latino of any race.

Of the 482 households in the CDP, 30.7% had children under the age of 18 living with them, 41.1% were headed by married couples living together, 15.4% had a female householder with no husband present, and 39.2% were non-families. 31.7% of all households were made up of individuals, and 9.8% were someone living alone who was 65 years of age or older. The average household size was 2.34, and the average family size was 2.87.

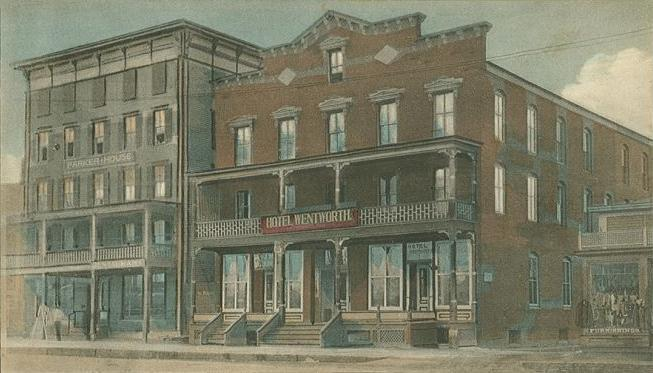
The Parker House and the Hotel Wentworth c. 1908

23.9% of residents in the CDP were under the age of 18, 9.4% were from age 18 to 24, 26.3% were from 25 to 44, 28.1% ere from 45 to 64, and 12.3% were 65 years of age or older. The median age was 38.0 years. For every 100 females, there were 92.5 males. For every 100 females age 18 and over, there were 87.5 males.

For the period 2011–15, the estimated median annual income for a household was $40,708, and the median income for a family was $34,635. The per capita income for the CDP was $14,945. About 28.4% of the population and 20.3% of families were below the poverty line, including 40.1% of those under age 18.

== Notable people ==
- Ann Stone Minot (1894–1980), research scientist at Vanderbilt University
- Chad Paronto, relief pitcher with four teams
- Bob Smith, pitcher with five teams
- Mark Steyn, columnist and author

== In popular culture ==
In 2017, the Oxygen network produced a six-part television documentary miniseries titled The Disappearance of Maura Murray, hosted by journalist Maggie Freleng.

== See also ==
- Disappearance of Maura Murray
