= North Haverhill, New Hampshire =

Census-designated place in New Hampshire, United States

- Census-designated place
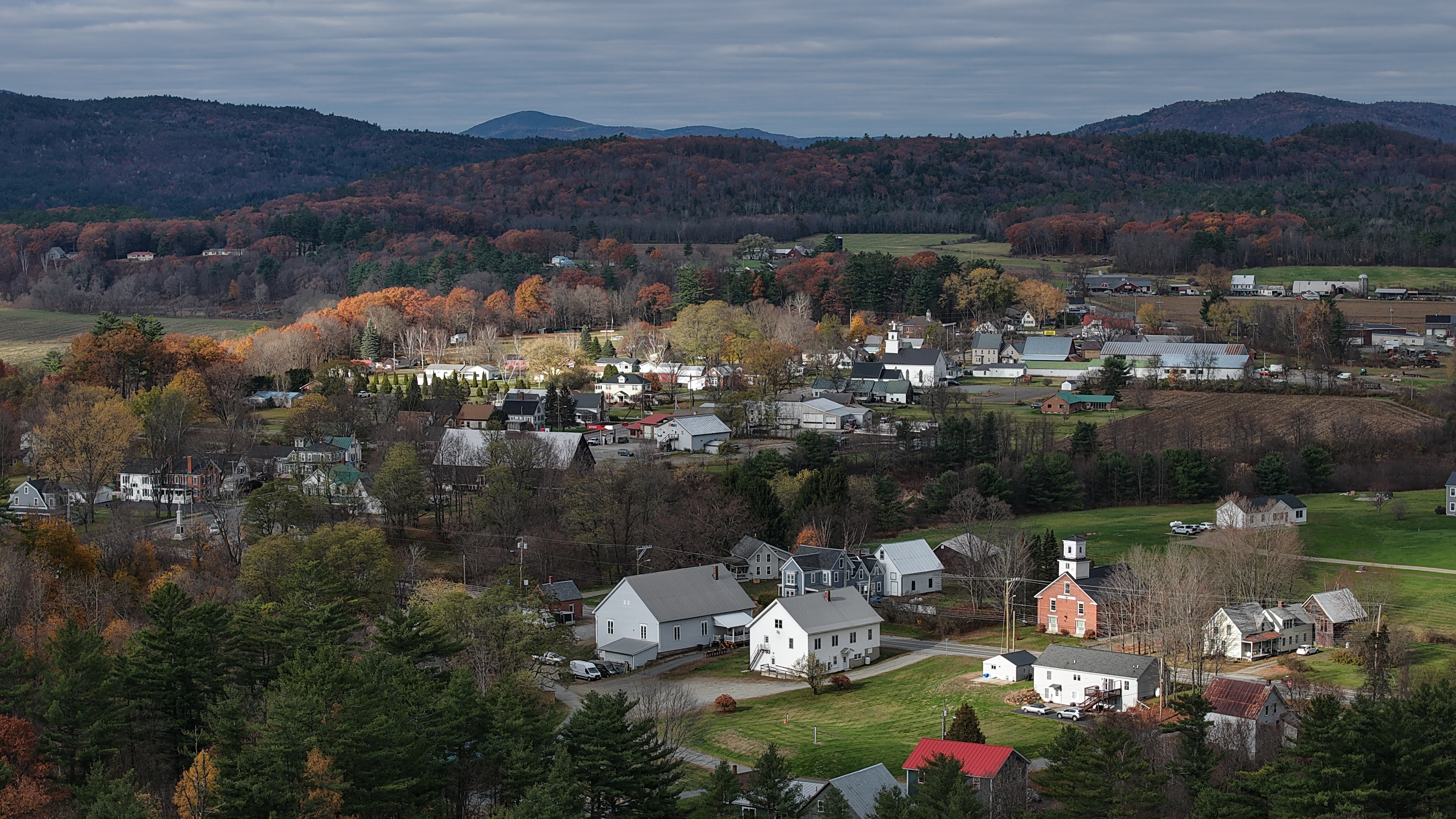
- North Haverhill, NH, from the south

- Location within New Hampshire Location within the United States
- Coordinates: 44°05′29″N 72°01′25″W
- Country: United States
- State: New Hampshire
- County: Grafton
- Town: Haverhill

Area
  - Total: 4.01 sq mi (10.39 km^{2})
  - Land: 3.59 sq mi (9.29 km^{2})
  - Water: 0.42 sq mi (1.10 km^{2})
- Elevation: 469 ft (143 m)

Population (2020)
  - Total: 843
  - Density: 235.0/sq mi (90.73/km^{2})
- Time zone: UTC-5 (Eastern (EST))
  - Summer (DST): UTC-4 (EDT)
- ZIP code: 03774
- Area code: 603
- FIPS code: 33-54740
- GNIS feature ID: 2745670

North Haverhill is an unincorporated community and census-designated place (CDP) in Haverhill, New Hampshire, United States. It is one of several villages in the town of Haverhill. As of the 2020 census, North Haverhill had a population of 843.

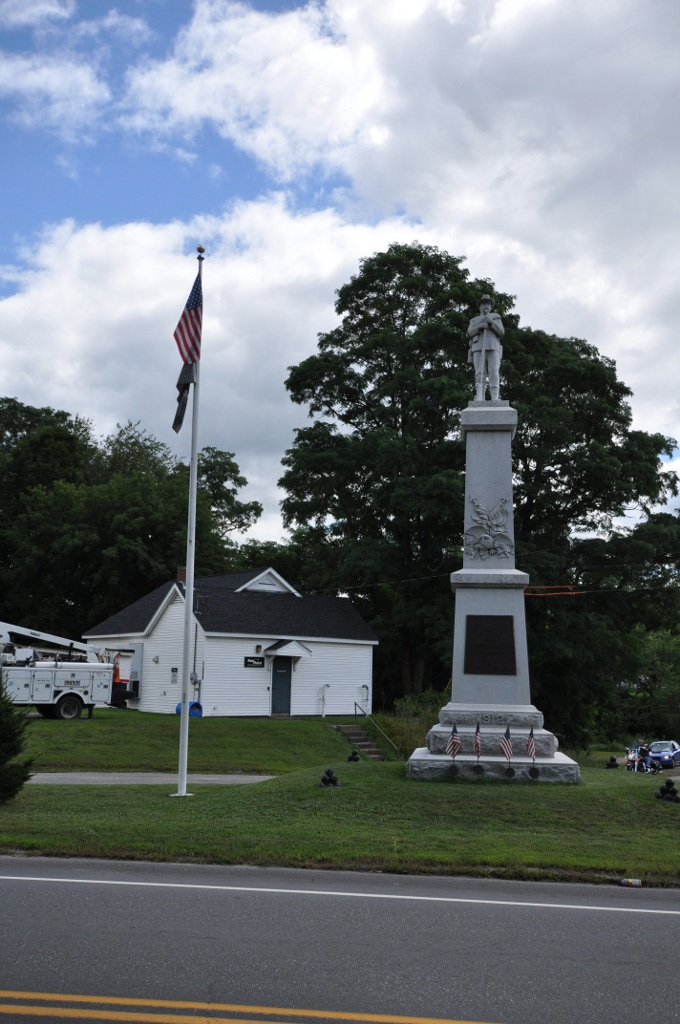
Haverhill's war memorial

The village is centered on the junction of New Hampshire Routes 10 and 116, on a bluff overlooking the Connecticut River, the western boundary of New Hampshire. It is situated in the middle of a fertile agricultural area at the western base of the White Mountains. Route 10, following the Connecticut River, connects the village of Woodsville to the north with the towns of Piermont, Orford, Lyme, and Hanover to the south. Route 116 heads east into the White Mountains, leading to the towns of Benton, Easton, and Franconia.

In 1972 the county courthouse and related offices moved from Woodsville into a new office complex on Route 10, just north of the North Haverhill village center. North Haverhill has a separate ZIP code (03774) from other areas in the town of Haverhill.

== Demographics ==
Historical population
Census	Pop.	Note	%±
2020	843		—
U.S. Decennial Census

== Notable person ==
- Mike Olsen, retired NASCAR driver
