= 2011 American League Championship Series =

42nd edition of Major League Baseball's American League Championship Series

Team (Wins)	Managers	Season
Texas Rangers (4)	Ron Washington	96–66 (.593), GA: 10
Detroit Tigers (2)	Jim Leyland	95–67 (.586), GA: 15
- Dates: October 8–15
- MVP: Nelson Cruz (Texas)
- Umpires: Tim Welke (crew chief), Larry Vanover, Jim Wolf, Fieldin Culbreth, Jeff Nelson, Tom Hallion

Broadcast
- Television: Fox
- TV announcers: Joe Buck, Terry Francona (Games 1–2), and Tim McCarver (Games 3–6)
- Radio: ESPN
- Radio announcers: Dan Shulman and Orel Hershiser
- ALDS: Detroit Tigers over New York Yankees (3–2); Texas Rangers over Tampa Bay Rays (3–1)

The 2011 American League Championship Series (ALCS) was a best-of-seven playoff that pitted the defending American League champion and second-seeded Texas Rangers and the third-seeded Detroit Tigers for the American League pennant and the right to play in the 2011 World Series. The Rangers won the series, 4–2, but would ultimately lose to the National League champion, the St. Louis Cardinals, in the 2011 World Series. The series began on October 8, and ended on October 15. The series was the 42nd in league history.

Fox televised all games in the United States. Games 1, 2, and 6 were played at Rangers Ballpark in Arlington, Texas, while games 3, 4, and 5 were played at Comerica Park in Detroit.

This was the first postseason meeting between the Rangers and the Tigers. The 2011 ALCS marked the first time the Tigers appeared in the ALCS (and the postseason overall) since 2006, while the Rangers were playing in their second consecutive appearance. This was the last ALCS to not feature a team from the AL East until 2023.

== Summary ==
=== Texas Rangers vs. Detroit Tigers ===
Texas won the series, 4–2.

Game	Date	Score	Location	Time	Attendance
1	October 8	Detroit Tigers – 2, Texas Rangers – 3	Rangers Ballpark in Arlington	3:07 (1:50 delay)	50,114
2	October 10†	Detroit Tigers – 3, Texas Rangers – 7 (11)	Rangers Ballpark in Arlington	4:25	51,227
3	October 11	Texas Rangers – 2, Detroit Tigers – 5	Comerica Park	3:08	41,905
4	October 12	Texas Rangers – 7, Detroit Tigers – 3 (11)	Comerica Park	4:00 (2:13 delay)	42,234
5	October 13	Texas Rangers – 5, Detroit Tigers – 7	Comerica Park	3:21	41,908
6	October 15	Detroit Tigers – 5, Texas Rangers – 15	Rangers Ballpark in Arlington	3:32	51,508

†: postponed from October 9 due to rain

== Game summaries ==
=== Game 1 ===
October 8, 2011 7:05 pm (CDT) at Rangers Ballpark in Arlington, Texas 77 °F (25 °C), chance of t-storms
Team	1	2	3	4	5	6	7	8	9	R	H	E
Detroit	0	0	0	0	2	0	0	0	0	2	7	1
Texas	0	2	0	1	0	0	0	0	X	3	6	0
WP: Alexi Ogando (1–0) LP: Justin Verlander (0–1) Sv: Neftalí Feliz (1); Home runs: DET: None; TEX: Nelson Cruz (1); Attendance: 50,114; Boxscore

The Tigers loaded the bases in the first inning with one out, but C. J. Wilson escaped the jam when Magglio Ordóñez grounded into a double play. The Rangers scored two runs in the second on a triple from David Murphy and a single from Ian Kinsler. Nelson Cruz added a solo home run in the fourth. After a 41-minute rain delay, Austin Jackson doubled in the Tigers' first run. Then after two walks loaded the bases, a wild pitch brought home Jackson to make the score 3–2 Rangers. After a second rain delay, Michael Gonzalez relieved Wilson and got Alex Avila to ground out to second with the bases loaded. Rick Porcello pitched two innings of relief of Verlander and the bullpens took over from there. After the Rangers bullpen threw 3 1/3 innings of scoreless relief, Neftalí Feliz came on to get the save. After allowing a lead-off single, Feliz struck out the next three batters to save it for the Rangers.

=== Game 2 ===
October 10, 2011 3:19 pm (CDT) at Rangers Ballpark in Arlington, Texas 76 °F (24 °C), partly cloudy
Team	1	2	3	4	5	6	7	8	9	10	11	R	H	E
Detroit	0	0	3	0	0	0	0	0	0	0	0	3	8	0
Texas	2	0	0	0	0	0	1	0	0	0	4	7	11	1
WP: Mike Adams (1–0) LP: Ryan Perry (0–1); Home runs: DET: Ryan Raburn (1); TEX: Nelson Cruz 2 (3); Attendance: 51,227; Boxscore

Game 2 was originally scheduled for October 9, but was postponed hours before it began due to the forecast of heavy rain in the area, in an attempt to avoid a repeat of the previous game. However, the rain never actually came; forecasts just prior to what would have been the beginning of the game indicated only a 10% chance of rain.

Josh Hamilton and Adrián Beltré each had an RBI in the first to give the Rangers an early lead. However, Ryan Raburn hit a three-run home run in the third to give the Tigers the lead, chasing Derek Holland out of the game. Nelson Cruz hit a home run in the seventh with no outs off Max Scherzer to tie the game at three, chasing Scherzer out of the game as well. The Rangers loaded the bases with no outs in the ninth against Tigers' closer José Valverde, but Valverde escaped the jam with a shallow fly ball and a 3–2–3 double play, leading to the Rangers' first postseason extra-inning game. After two scoreless innings from the bullpen, the Rangers again loaded the bases with no outs in the bottom of the 11th inning. This time, however, the Rangers ended the game when Nelson Cruz hit a game-winning grand slam, the first officially recorded^{[GS]} walk-off grand slam in Major League Baseball postseason history and the first walk-off win in Rangers' postseason history.

=== Game 3 ===
October 11, 2011 8:05 pm (EDT) at Comerica Park in Detroit, Michigan 68 °F (20 °C), partly cloudy
Team	1	2	3	4	5	6	7	8	9	R	H	E
Texas	1	0	0	0	0	0	0	1	0	2	8	0
Detroit	0	0	0	1	1	2	1	0	X	5	11	0
WP: Doug Fister (1–0) LP: Colby Lewis (0–1) Sv: José Valverde (1); Home runs: TEX: None; DET: Víctor Martínez (1), Jhonny Peralta (1), Miguel Cabrera (1); Attendance: 41,905; Boxscore

The Rangers began the game with three straight hits from Ian Kinsler, Elvis Andrus, and Josh Hamilton scoring a run. Tiger starter Doug Fister, however, limited the damage by getting Michael Young to ground into a double play and striking out Adrián Beltré. The Tigers tied the game in the bottom of the fourth on a Víctor Martínez solo home run. The Tigers took the lead in the fifth on a two-out two-strike hit by Miguel Cabrera. The Tigers made it 3–1 with another solo home run by Jhonny Peralta. They added another run on an Austin Jackson single. The Tigers extended their lead to 5–1 on yet another solo home run in the seventh by Miguel Cabrera. The Rangers cut the lead to 5–2 in the eighth on Ian Kinsler's groundout off of Joaquin Benoit that scored Yorvit Torrealba, who doubled to lead off the inning off of Doug Fister. José Valverde came on in the ninth to get the save. He worked around a leadoff double by Josh Hamilton to secure the Tigers' first victory of the series.

=== Game 4 ===
October 12, 2011 4:19 pm (EDT) (moved to 6:32 pm EDT due to rain delay) at Comerica Park in Detroit, Michigan 59 °F (15 °C), light rain
Team	1	2	3	4	5	6	7	8	9	10	11	R	H	E
Texas	0	0	0	0	0	3	0	0	0	0	4	7	11	0
Detroit	0	0	2	0	0	0	1	0	0	0	0	3	5	1
WP: Scott Feldman (1–0) LP: José Valverde (0–1); Home runs: TEX: Nelson Cruz (4); DET: Brandon Inge (1); Attendance: 42,234; Boxscore

After a 133-minute rain delay, Game 4 commenced. The Tigers rallied for two runs in the bottom of the third inning on singles by Brandon Inge and Ryan Raburn. Miguel Cabrera drove them in with a two-run double. The Rangers got on the board in the sixth with a David Murphy single and an Ian Kinsler double. Elvis Andrus tied the game with a hit of his own. The Rangers grabbed the lead on a single by Michael Young after a wild pick-off throw to first allowed Andrus to advance to second base. Rick Porcello struggled in the seventh, allowing two singles, chasing him from the game. Al Alburquerque walked a batter to load the bases, but left them stranded. Brandon Inge tied the game with a solo home run in the seventh inning. In the eighth, the Tigers threatened when Miguel Cabrera walked and Víctor Martínez singled to advance Cabrera to third. Delmon Young hit a deep fly ball to Nelson Cruz, but he caught it and threw it to home plate to tag Cabrera out. In the 11th, the Rangers grabbed a 4–3 lead on a leadoff double by Josh Hamilton and a one-out single by Mike Napoli. Nelson Cruz then hit his fourth home run of the series, a three-run shot to make it 7–3 Rangers. That would be the final score as the Tigers went down in order in the bottom of the inning.

=== Game 5 ===
October 13, 2011 4:19 pm (EDT) at Comerica Park in Detroit, Michigan 64 °F (18 °C), cloudy
Team	1	2	3	4	5	6	7	8	9	R	H	E
Texas	1	0	0	0	1	0	0	2	1	5	10	1
Detroit	0	0	1	1	0	4	1	0	X	7	10	1
WP: Justin Verlander (1–1) LP: C. J. Wilson (0–1) Sv: Phil Coke (1); Home runs: TEX: Nelson Cruz (5); DET: Alex Avila (1), Delmon Young 2 (2), Ryan Raburn (2); Attendance: 41,908; Boxscore

The Rangers struck quickly in the first inning against Justin Verlander on a leadoff double from Ian Kinsler, a bunt from Elvis Andrus, and sacrifice fly from Josh Hamilton. Avila homered for Detroit in the third inning to tie it at 1. Delmon Young gave Detroit the lead with a solo home run in the bottom of the fourth. Hamilton tied the game up in the fifth inning for the Rangers after Kinsler walked with one out and moved to second after an Andrus single. The Tigers rallied for four runs in the sixth inning on a Ryan Raburn single, a Miguel Cabrera double, a Víctor Martínez triple, and a Delmon Young homer to make it 6–2 Tigers. In doing so, they became the first team to hit for a "combined" natural cycle in four consecutive at bats. The Rangers chipped away with another home run from Nelson Cruz, this time a two-run shot, which chased Verlander out of the game and brought Texas within three runs. In the ninth, Josh Hamilton doubled with two outs off of Phil Coke and scored on Michael Young's single. Adrián Beltré walked to put the tying run on base, but Coke got Mike Napoli to ground out to second for the save.

=== Game 6 ===
October 15, 2011 7:05 pm (CDT) at Rangers Ballpark in Arlington, Texas 86 °F (30 °C), clear
Team	1	2	3	4	5	6	7	8	9	R	H	E
Detroit	1	1	0	0	2	0	0	1	0	5	10	2
Texas	0	0	9	0	1	2	3	0	X	15	17	0
WP: Alexi Ogando (2–0) LP: Max Scherzer (0–1); Home runs: DET: Miguel Cabrera 2 (3), Jhonny Peralta (2), Austin Jackson (1); TEX: Michael Young (1), Nelson Cruz (6); Attendance: 51,508; Boxscore

Looking to force a decisive Game 7, the Tigers struck first on a solo home run in the first by Miguel Cabrera. They added another solo shot in the second by Jhonny Peralta with one out to make the score 2–0 Tigers.

However, any chance the Tigers had of forcing a Game 7 would fall apart courtesy of a nine-run Rangers third inning. After Ian Kinsler grounded sharply to Brandon Inge for the first out, Elvis Andrus walked followed by a single from Josh Hamilton. Michael Young, who had been in a terrible slump the entire postseason, doubled down the left-field line sending both runners home to tie it at two. Adrián Beltré singled, scoring Michael Young. Following walks for both Mike Napoli and Nelson Cruz, the Tigers pulled Max Scherzer and put in Daniel Schlereth. David Murphy singled home both Napoli and Beltré, and with David Murphy and Nelson Cruz on first and second, respectively. Tiger starter Rick Porcello was brought in to face Endy Chávez; the Rangers countered by pinch-hitting Craig Gentry, who reached on a fielder's choice. Kinsler singled to score Cruz and Murphy. Andrus reached on a fielder's choice, loading the bases. Michael Young finished the inning by doubling down the right-field line, sending home Kinsler and Andrus. Young would become the first player in LCS history to have two extra-base hits in the same inning and fourth in the postseason overall, the other three occurring in the World Series.

Looking for a comeback, the Tigers got two back on an Austin Jackson home run in the top of the fifth, chasing Holland, but the Rangers answered with a Josh Hamilton sacrifice fly in the bottom of the fifth to make it 10–4 Rangers.

The Rangers extended the lead to 12–4 in the sixth and 15–4 with a home run from Young and the sixth home run of the series from Nelson Cruz in the seventh to rout the Tigers. The Tigers scored their last run on a second solo home run from Miguel Cabrera. Neftalí Feliz came on in the ninth inning for the Rangers in a non-save situation. He retired Brandon Inge on a pop-up for the last out, sealing the Rangers a second consecutive trip to the World Series. In hitting a postseason-record six home runs throughout the series, including two in extra innings (one being a game-winning grand slam), Nelson Cruz earned the Series MVP award.

== Composite box ==
2011 ALCS (4–2): Texas Rangers over Detroit Tigers

Team	1	2	3	4	5	6	7	8	9	10	11	R	H	E
Texas Rangers	4	2	9	1	2	5	4	3	1	0	8	39	63	2
Detroit Tigers	1	1	6	2	5	6	3	1	0	0	0	25	51	5
Total attendance: 278,896 Average attendance: 46,483

== Footnotes ==
- ^{GS} Robin Ventura hit a game-winning grand slam off Kevin McGlinchy in 1999 NLCS but never made it home as he was mobbed by his teammates between first and second base, so it was ruled a single. This event came to be known as the "Grand Slam Single".
