= 2007 World Series =

103rd edition of Major League Baseball's championship series

Team (Wins)	Managers	Season
Boston Red Sox (4)	Terry Francona	96–66, .593, GA: 2
Colorado Rockies (0)	Clint Hurdle	90–73, .552, GB: 1/2
- Dates: October 24–28
- Venue(s): Fenway Park (Boston); Coors Field (Colorado)
- MVP: Mike Lowell (Boston)
- Umpires: Ed Montague (crew chief), Laz Díaz, Ted Barrett, Chuck Meriwether, Mike Everitt, Mike Reilly
- Hall of Famers: Red Sox: David Ortiz; Rockies: Todd Helton

Broadcast
- Television: Fox (United States); MLB International (International)
- TV announcers: Joe Buck and Tim McCarver (Fox); Dave O'Brien and Rick Sutcliffe (MLB International)
- Radio: ESPN; WRKO (BOS); KOA (COL)
- Radio announcers: Jon Miller and Joe Morgan; Joe Castiglione and Glenn Geffner (WRKO); Jeff Kingery and Jack Corrigan (KOA)
- ALCS: Boston Red Sox over Cleveland Indians (4–3)
- NLCS: Colorado Rockies over Arizona Diamondbacks (4–0)

The 2007 World Series was the championship series of Major League Baseball's (MLB) 2007 season. The 103rd edition of the World Series, it was a best-of-seven playoff between the National League (NL) champion Colorado Rockies and the American League (AL) champion Boston Red Sox; the Red Sox swept the Rockies in four games.

It is the Rockies' first and only appearance in a World Series as of 2026. Boston’s victory was their second World Series championship in four seasons, their second consecutive World Series sweep and their seventh World Series victory overall; it also marked the third sweep in four years by the AL champions. The series began on Wednesday, October 24 and ended on Sunday, October 28.

Terry Francona became the second Red Sox manager to win two World Series titles, following Bill Carrigan, who won the 1915 and 1916 World Series. Including the last three games of the AL Championship Series, the Red Sox outscored their opposition 59–15 over their final seven games. Francona also became the first manager to win his first 8 World Series games. The Rockies, meanwhile, became the first NL team to get swept in a World Series after sweeping the League Championship Series, and just the second team ever to suffer such a fate, following the Oakland Athletics in 1990. This fate would again be suffered by the 2012 Detroit Tigers, being swept by the San Francisco Giants in the World Series after sweeping the New York Yankees in the ALCS. As of the conclusion of the 2025 season, 2007 remains the most recent season an American League team has swept a National League team in the World Series.

== Background ==
This was the fourth time since the beginning of interleague play in 1997 that a World Series matchup would be a rematch from the regular season. The Rockies beat the Red Sox 2-1 in a three game series at Fenway Park from June 12–14.

Over the course of 29 days in September through the middle of October, the Rockies won 21 games and lost just once, including sweeps of the Philadelphia Phillies in the NLDS and the division rival Arizona Diamondbacks in the NLCS. They also beat the San Diego Padres in the NL Wild Card tie-breaker. The Rockies run in 2007 proved to be one of the most unlikely postseason runs in MLB history, having just 33/1 odds at the start of 2007 to win the National League. The Rockies' eight-day layoff was the longest in MLB postseason history, caused by their sweep in the NLCS, the ALCS going seven games, and scheduling by MLB.

The Red Sox were more a conventionally dominant team, leading the American League East for most the season. In the postseason, the Red Sox swept the Los Angeles Angels of Anaheim in the ALDS and defeated the Cleveland Indians in the ALCS after trailing three games to one, taking the final three contests by a combined score of 30–5. There were a number of the famed curse-breaking 2004 Red Sox players still with the team. Neither participating team was in the previous year's postseason.

Per the 2006 Collective Bargaining Agreement, the Red Sox had home-field advantage in the World Series following the American League's 5–4 win in the 2007 All-Star Game. The first two games took place in Boston, with games 3 and 4 in Denver.

=== Ticket controversy ===
The countdown page seen by many people attempting to buy World Series tickets: when the countdown completed it would either load a page to select seats or just restart the countdown.

On October 17, 2007, a week before the first game of the World Series, the Colorado Rockies announced that tickets would be made available to the general public via online sales only, despite prior arrangements to sell the tickets at local retail outlets. Five days later, California-based ticket vendor Paciolan, Inc., the sole contractor authorized by the Colorado Rockies to distribute tickets, was forced to suspend sales after less than an hour due to an exorbitant number of purchase attempts.

The Rockies organization said that they were the victims of a denial-of-service attack. The FBI started its own investigation into these claims. Ticket sales resumed the next day, with all three home games selling out within 2 1/2 hours.

The Red Sox also relied primarily on online sales to sell the game tickets, although some Fenway Park tickets were sold on the phone and at the box office. The Sox held a random drawing for the right to buy post season tickets on October 15, and winners bought tickets at a private online sale. Street prices were lower in Boston this time than in 2004: the average price, according to StubHub, was about $1500 in 2007, down about $300 from three years previously. Some Sox fans found that it was cheaper to travel to Denver to see World Series games than to pay the street price for Boston game tickets.

== Summary ==
Boston won the series, 4–0.

Game	Date	Score	Location	Time	Attendance
1	October 24	Colorado Rockies – 1, Boston Red Sox – 13	Fenway Park	3:30	36,733
2	October 25	Colorado Rockies – 1, Boston Red Sox – 2	Fenway Park	3:39	36,370
3	October 27	Boston Red Sox – 10, Colorado Rockies – 5	Coors Field	4:19	49,983
4	October 28	Boston Red Sox – 4, Colorado Rockies – 3	Coors Field	3:35	50,041

== Matchups ==
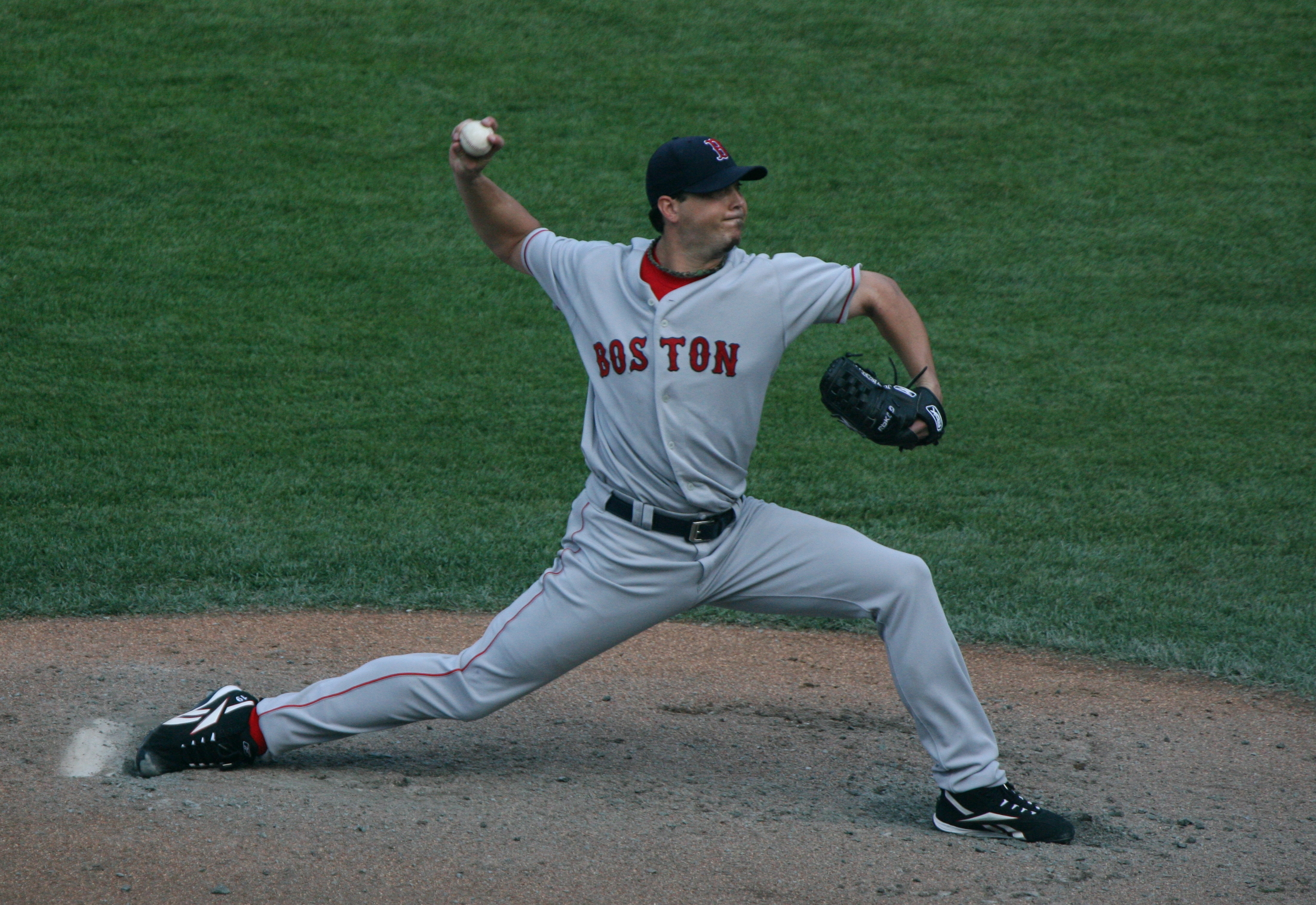
Josh Beckett started and won Game 1.

=== Game 1 ===
October 24, 2007 8:00 pm (EDT) at Fenway Park in Boston, Massachusetts 55 °F (13 °C), chance of rain
Team	1	2	3	4	5	6	7	8	9	R	H	E
Colorado	0	1	0	0	0	0	0	0	0	1	6	0
Boston	3	1	0	2	7	0	0	0	X	13	17	0
WP: Josh Beckett (1–0) LP: Jeff Francis (0–1); Home runs: COL: None; BOS: Dustin Pedroia (1); Attendance: 36,733; Boxscore

The Red Sox cruised to a blowout win in Game 1 behind ALCS MVP Josh Beckett, who struck out nine batters, including the first four he faced, over seven innings en route to his fourth win of the 2007 postseason. Mike Timlin and Éric Gagné pitched a perfect eighth and ninth, respectively.

Boston Hall of Famer Carl Yastrzemski threw the ceremonial first pitch, as he had done before Game 1 in 2004. Rookie Dustin Pedroia led off the Sox' first inning with a home run over the Green Monster in Fenway Park off of Jeff Francis. Pedroia's homer was only the second lead-off home run to start a World Series (the only other one was hit by Baltimore's Don Buford in 1969). Kevin Youkilis then doubled to right, moved to third on David Ortiz's groundout, and scored on Manny Ramirez's single. After Mike Lowell flew out, Jason Varitek singled before J. D. Drew doubled to score Ramirez and make it 3-0 Red Sox.

The Rockies got on the board in the second when Garrett Atkins doubled with one out off Beckett and scored on Troy Tulowitzki's double one out later, but the Red Sox got that run back off of Francis when Youkilis walked with two outs and scored on Ortiz's double. In the fourth, the Red Sox loaded the bases with two outs on a single, double, and intentional walk when Varitek's two-run double put them up 6–1.

They put the game out of reach with seven runs in the fifth. Julio Lugo hit a leadoff single off of reliever Franklin Morales before Jacoby Ellsbury bunted into a forceout at second. After Pedroia popped out, a balk moved Ellsbury to second before he scored on Youkilis's double. Ortiz's double and Ramirez's single scored a run each. The Red Sox loaded the bases on a double and walk before Drew's single scored another run. Ryan Speier relieved Morales and walked all three batters he faced to force in three more Boston runs. Matt Herges relieved Speier and got Youkilis to fly out to right to end the inning.

Though Herges and two relievers held Boston scoreless for the rest of the game, the Red Sox finished with 13 runs, the most ever in a World Series Game 1, and tied another record with nine extra base hits. The last 11 of the Red Sox runs came with two outs.

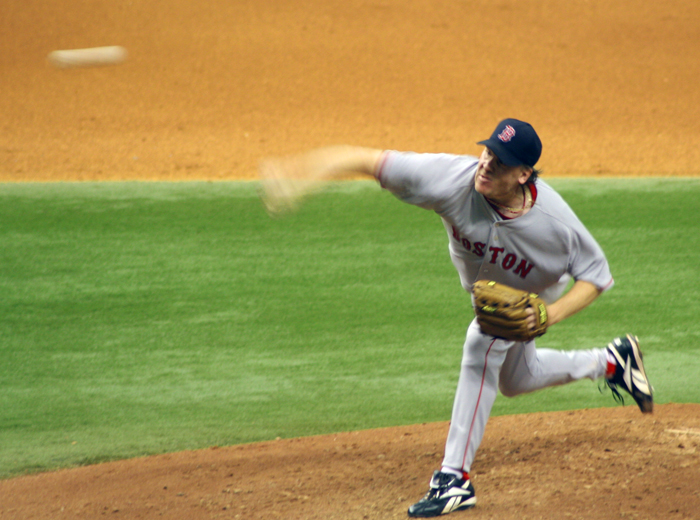
Curt Schilling pitched and won Game 2, allowing only one run in five innings.

=== Game 2 ===
October 25, 2007 8:00 pm (EDT) at Fenway Park in Boston, Massachusetts 51 °F (11 °C), partly cloudy
Team	1	2	3	4	5	6	7	8	9	R	H	E
Colorado	1	0	0	0	0	0	0	0	0	1	5	0
Boston	0	0	0	1	1	0	0	0	X	2	6	1
WP: Curt Schilling (1–0) LP: Ubaldo Jiménez (0–1) Sv: Jonathan Papelbon (1); Attendance: 36,730; Boxscore

The ceremonial first pitch was thrown by Andrew Madden, a 13-year-old heart transplant recipient, accompanied by Boston Red Sox Hall of Fame member Dwight Evans. After the debacle of Game 1, Colorado appeared to return to form, scoring quickly on a groundout by Todd Helton with runners on second and third in the first. However, this would be the only time the Rockies ever led in the series as postseason veteran Curt Schilling (5 1/3 IP, one run, four hits) and Boston's bullpen (Okajima, 2 1/3 IP; Papelbon, 1 1/3 IP) allowed no other runs in the contest. The Red Sox tied the game in the fourth off of Ubaldo Jimenez on Jason Varitek's sacrifice fly with runners on second and third, then took the lead next inning on Mike Lowell's RBI double with runners on first and second. Matt Holliday had four of Colorado's five hits in Game 2, including a base hit off Papelbon with two outs in the eighth. Before throwing another pitch, Papelbon caught Holliday leaning too far off first base and picked him off—Papelbon's first career pickoff.

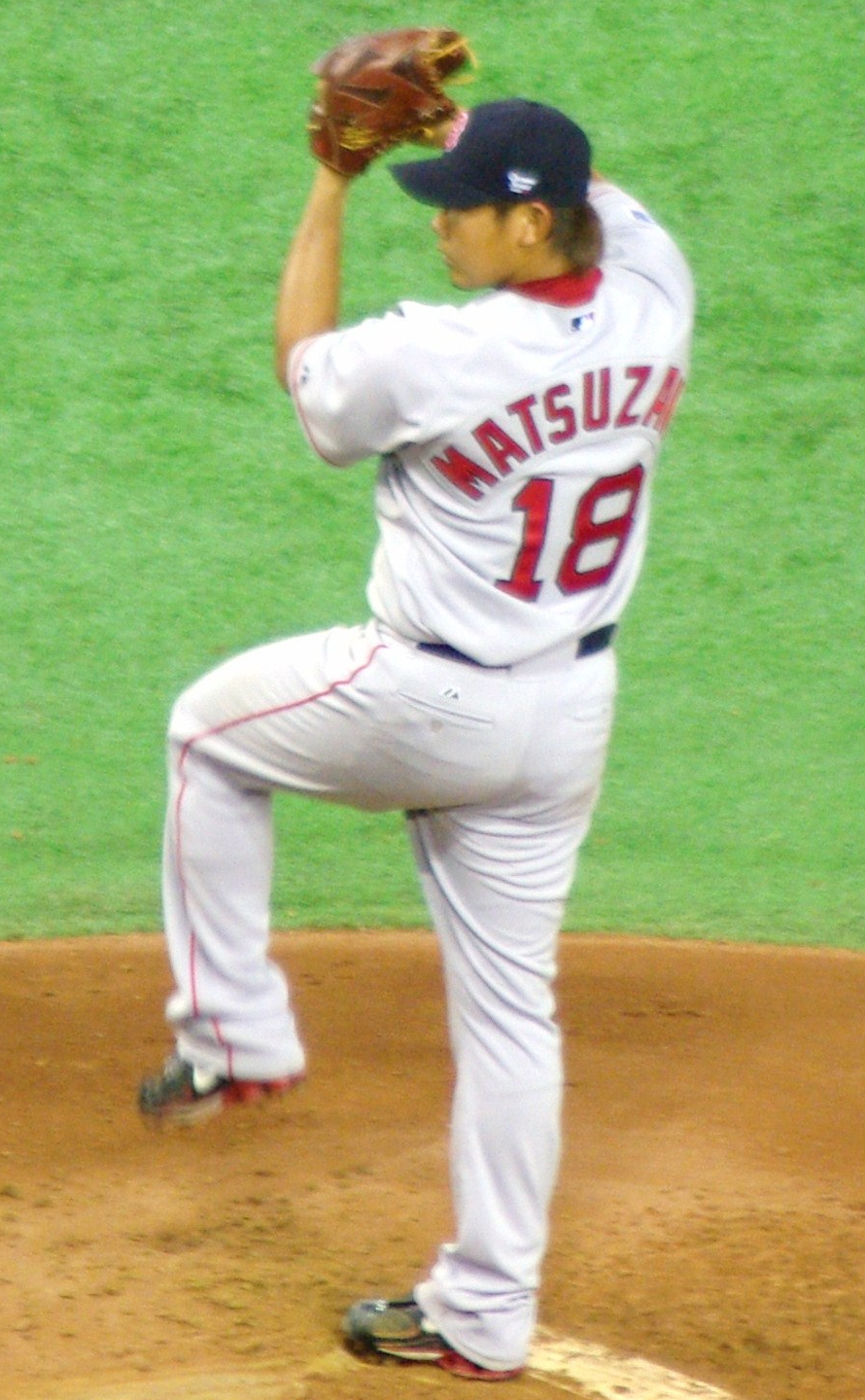
Daisuke Matsuzaka became the first Japanese player to start and win a World Series game.

=== Game 3 ===
October 27, 2007 6:00 pm (MDT) at Coors Field in Denver, Colorado 46 °F (8 °C), Mostly cloudy
Team	1	2	3	4	5	6	7	8	9	R	H	E
Boston	0	0	6	0	0	0	0	3	1	10	15	1
Colorado	0	0	0	0	0	2	3	0	0	5	11	0
WP: Daisuke Matsuzaka (1–0) LP: Josh Fogg (0–1) Sv: Jonathan Papelbon (2); Home runs: BOS: None; COL: Matt Holliday (1); Attendance: 49,983; Boxscore

This was the first World Series game ever played in Colorado. At 4 hours 19 minutes, it became the longest nine-inning game in World Series history. Game 3 was also the 600th World Series game ever played. Starting pitcher Daisuke Matsuzaka pitched five innings of scoreless ball and left in the sixth with no runs allowed. The Red Sox struck first with a six-run third inning. Rookie Jacoby Ellsbury hit a leadoff double, moved to third on Dustin Pedroia's single, and scored on David Ortiz's double. After Manny Ramirez was intentionally walked, Mike Lowell's single scored two more runs. J. D. Drew popped out before Ramirez was thrown out at home on Jason Varitek's single with Lowell advancing to third. After Julio Lugo walked to load the bases, Matsuzaka hit a two-run single for his first base hit and RBI in the Major Leagues. Ellsbury capped the scoring with his second double of the inning to knock Colorado starter Josh Fogg out of the game. The Rockies' bats came to life in the sixth and seventh innings against a normally-solid but now-shaky Boston bullpen. After Matsuzaka walked two straight in the sixth with one out, reliever Javier López allowed back-to-back RBI singles to Brad Hawpe and Yorvit Torrealba. Mike Timlin allowed two straight leadoff singles in the seventh before NLCS MVP Matt Holliday brought the Rockies to within one run with a three-run home run off Hideki Okajima. Brian Fuentes gave back those runs in the eighth by walking Lugo with one out and allowing a subsequent single to Coco Crisp before Ellsbury and Dustin Pedroia, who had four and three hits, respectively, on the night (the first time in World Series history two rookies had at least three hits in a game) hit back-to-back RBI doubles, raising Boston's lead to 9–5. Jonathan Papelbon came on for a four-out save, getting Holliday to fly out on one pitch, leaving runners on first and second. Jason Varitek would tack on Boston's tenth run in the top of the ninth off of LaTroy Hawkins with a sacrifice fly, scoring Mike Lowell who, not generally considered a stolen base threat, had just stolen third base—the first time a Red Sox baserunner stole third base in the World Series since 1975—after hitting a leadoff single and moving to second on a sacrifice bunt. Papelbon came back out in the bottom of the ninth to complete the save, getting the first two outs before surrendering a two-out triple to Brad Hawpe, then finishing the game with a groundout from Yorvit Torrealba. The Red Sox took Game 3 by a final score of 10–5.

The Red Sox continued to set World Series records during Game 3:

- Ellsbury (four hits) and Pedroia (three) combined to score three runs and drive in four, while being the first rookies to bat 1–2 in a World Series lineup.
- Ellsbury became the third rookie in Series history with four hits in a game, joining Freddie Lindstrom of the New York Giants (Game 5, 1924) and Joe Garagiola of the Cardinals (Game 4, 1946).
- Matsuzaka became the first Japanese pitcher to start and win a World Series game. The only pitchers in Red Sox history, other than Matsuzaka, to have two RBI and be the winning pitcher were Babe Ruth in 1918 and Cy Young in 1903.
- The Red Sox' 16 doubles tied a World Series record, set by the 1982 Champion Cardinals. The Red Sox would break the record in Game 4, finishing with 18.

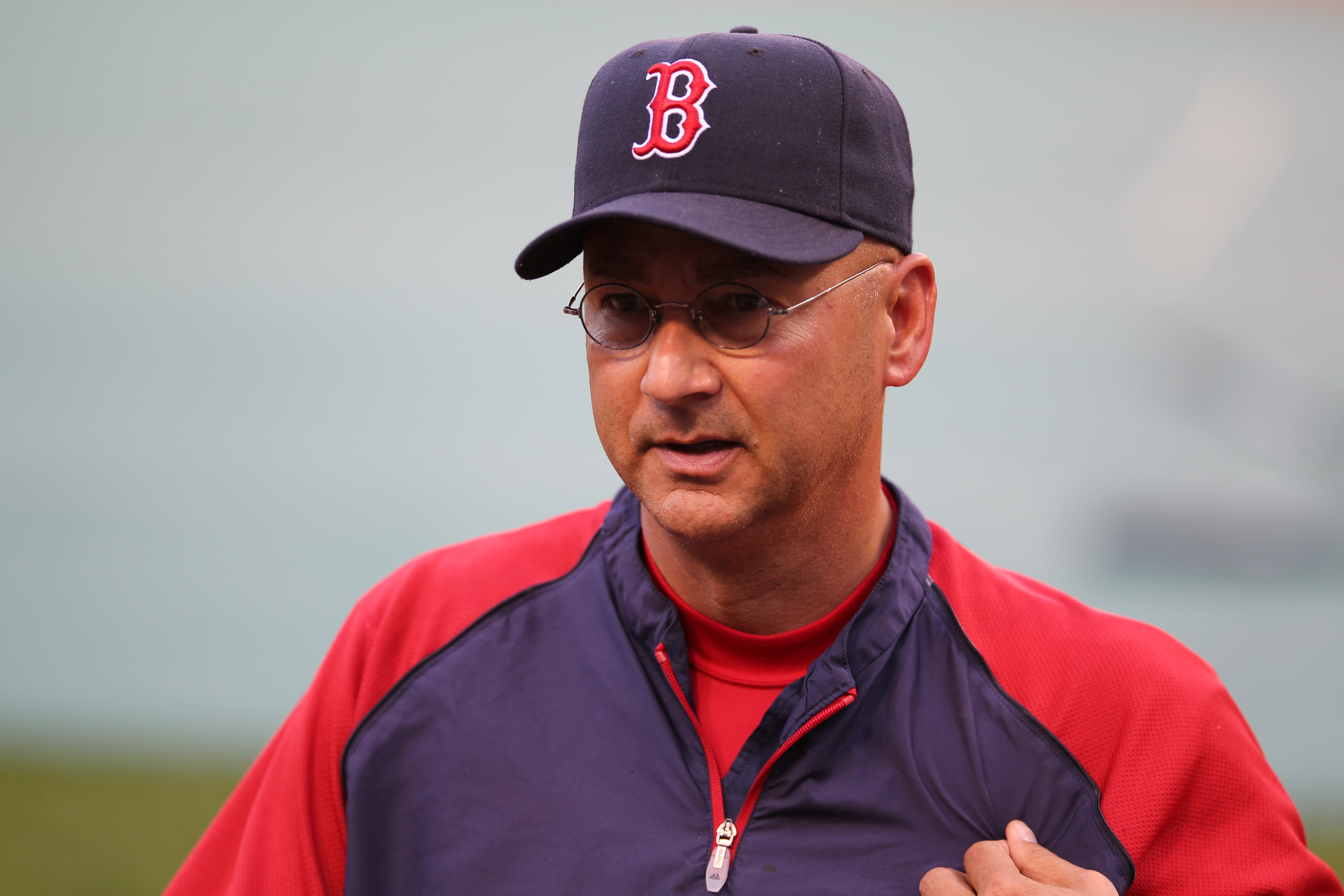
Terry Francona became the first manager since Bill Carrigan to win two World Series titles with the Red Sox.

=== Game 4 ===
October 28, 2007 6:00 pm (MDT) at Coors Field in Denver, Colorado 63 °F (17 °C), Clear
Team	1	2	3	4	5	6	7	8	9	R	H	E
Boston	1	0	0	0	1	0	1	1	0	4	9	0
Colorado	0	0	0	0	0	0	1	2	0	3	7	0
WP: Jon Lester (1–0) LP: Aaron Cook (0–1) Sv: Jonathan Papelbon (3); Home runs: BOS: Mike Lowell (1), Bobby Kielty (1); COL: Brad Hawpe (1), Garrett Atkins (1); Attendance: 50,041; Boxscore

The Red Sox struck early. Rookie Jacoby Ellsbury began the first inning with a double and was advanced by Dustin Pedroia with a groundout, followed by an RBI single from David Ortiz. Series MVP Mike Lowell hit a leadoff double in the fifth and scored on Jason Varitek's single, making the score 2–0 Boston. In the seventh inning, Lowell hit a home run to give Boston a 3–0 lead and knock starter Aaron Cook out of the game. The Colorado offense answered when left fielder Brad Hawpe hit a home run off of a Manny Delcarmen fastball, bringing the Rockies within two. Relief pitcher Brian Fuentes gave back that run abruptly, allowing Boston pinch-hitter Bobby Kielty to hit a ball into the left field stands on the first pitch of the inning, extending the Red Sox lead to 4–1. In the bottom of the inning Boston pitcher Hideki Okajima allowed a one-out single to Todd Helton followed by a Garrett Atkins two-run home run, bringing the Rockies within one. Jonathan Papelbon relieved Okajima and earned his third save of the series. At 12:06 a.m. EDT on Monday, October 29, Papelbon struck out Colorado pinch hitter Seth Smith for the final out of the 2007 season. Boston had won its second World Series title in four years and seventh all-time.

There was controversy in the top of the eighth when Fox's broadcast announced that Alex Rodriguez would be opting out of his contract with the Yankees to become a free agent. Commissioner Bud Selig made it clear during the World Series that an embargo had been placed on all Major League Baseball stories until the sport's top event had come to an end. Rodriguez and his agent Scott Boras would later apologize for the incident.

The Rockies became the third team in Series history (the 1937 Yankees and 1966 Orioles were the others) not to commit an error in a World Series of any length. They were the first team to do so while losing the World Series.

== Composite line score ==
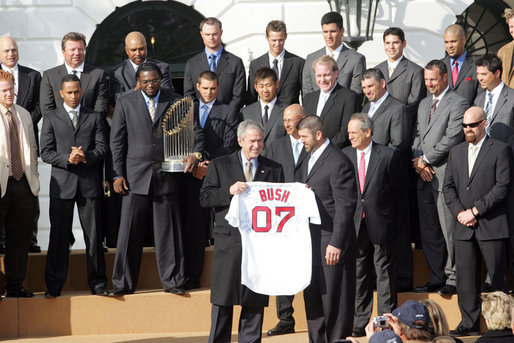
Victorious Red Sox players being honored at the White House by President George W. Bush.

2007 World Series (4–0): Boston Red Sox (A.L.) beat Colorado Rockies (N.L.).

Team	1	2	3	4	5	6	7	8	9	R	H	E
Boston Red Sox	4	1	6	3	9	0	1	4	1	29	47	2
Colorado Rockies	1	1	0	0	0	2	4	2	0	10	29	0
Total attendance: 173,127 Average attendance: 43,282; Winning player's share: $308,236 Losing player's share: $233,505

== Series Statistics ==
=== Boston Red Sox ===
==== Batting ====
Note: GP=Games played; AB=At bats; R=Runs; H=Hits; 2B=Doubles; 3B=Triples; HR=Home runs; RBI=Runs batted in; BB=Walks; AVG=Batting average; OBP=On base percentage; SLG=Slugging percentage

Player	GP	AB	R	H	2B	3B	HR	RBI	BB	AVG	OBP	SLG	Reference
Jason Varitek	4	15	2	5	1	0	0	5	1	.333	.333	.400	
Kevin Youkilis	4	9	3	2	2	0	0	1	3	.222	.417	.444	
Dustin Pedroia	4	18	2	5	1	0	1	4	2	.278	.350	.500	
Mike Lowell	4	15	6	6	3	0	1	4	3	.400	.500	.800	
Julio Lugo	4	13	2	5	1	0	0	1	3	.385	.500	.462	
Manny Ramirez	4	16	3	4	1	0	0	2	2	.250	.333	.313	
Jacoby Ellsbury	4	16	4	7	4	0	0	3	2	.438	.500	.688	
J. D. Drew	4	15	1	5	2	0	0	2	1	.333	.412	.467	
David Ortiz	4	15	4	5	3	0	0	4	2	.333	.412	.533	
Coco Crisp	3	2	1	1	0	0	0	0	0	.500	.500	.500	
Eric Hinske	1	1	0	0	0	0	0	0	0	.000	.000	.000	
Bobby Kielty	1	1	1	1	0	0	1	1	0	1.000	1.000	4.000	
Alex Cora	2	0	0	0	0	0	0	0	0	─	─	─	
Daisuke Matsuzaka	1	3	0	1	0	0	0	2	0	.333	.333	.333	
Jon Lester	1	2	0	0	0	0	0	0	0	.000	.000	.000	

==== Pitching ====
Note: G=Games Played; GS=Games Started; IP=Innings Pitched; H=Hits; BB=Walks; R=Runs; ER=Earned Runs; SO=Strikeouts; W=Wins; L=Losses; SV=Saves; ERA=Earned Run Average

Player	G	GS	IP	H	BB	R	ER	SO	W	L	SV	ERA	Reference
Josh Beckett	1	1	7	6	1	1	1	9	1	0	0	1.29	
Daisuke Matsuzaka	1	1	5 1/3	3	3	2	2	5	1	0	0	3.38	
Jon Lester	1	1	5 2/3	3	3	0	0	3	1	0	0	0.00	
Curt Schilling	1	1	5 1/3	4	2	1	1	4	1	0	0	1.69	
Jonathan Paplebon	3	0	4 1/3	2	0	0	0	3	0	0	3	0.00	
Hideki Okajima	3	0	3 2/3	4	0	3	3	6	0	0	0	7.36	
Mike Timlin	3	0	2 1/3	2	0	2	2	4	0	0	0	7.71	
Manny Delcarmen	2	0	1 1/3	3	1	1	1	1	0	0	0	6.75	
Éric Gagné	1	0	1	0	0	0	0	1	0	0	0	0.00	
Javier López	1	0	0	2	0	0	0	0	0	0	0	─	

=== Colorado Rockies ===
==== Batting ====
Note: GP=Games played; AB=At bats; R=Runs; H=Hits; 2B=Doubles; 3B=Triples; HR=Home runs; RBI=Runs batted in; BB=Walks; AVG=Batting average; OBP=On base percentage; SLG=Slugging percentage

Player	GP	AB	R	H	2B	3B	HR	RBI	BB	AVG	OBP	SLG	Reference
Yorvit Torrealba	4	14	0	2	0	0	0	1	0	.143	.143	.143	
Todd Helton	4	15	2	5	2	0	0	1	2	.333	.412	.467	
Kazuo Matsui	4	17	1	5	1	0	0	0	0	.294	.294	.353	
Garrett Atkins	4	13	3	2	1	0	1	2	3	.154	.353	.462	
Troy Tulowitzki	4	13	1	3	2	0	0	1	2	.231	.333	.385	
Matt Holliday	4	17	1	5	0	0	1	3	0	.294	.294	.471	
Ryan Spilborghs	4	10	0	0	0	0	0	0	2	.000	.167	.000	
Brad Hawpe	4	16	1	4	0	1	1	2	1	.250	.294	.563	
Willy Taveras	3	8	1	0	0	0	0	0	0	.000	.111	.000	
Cory Sullivan	2	3	0	1	0	0	0	0	0	.333	.333	.333	
Seth Smith	2	2	1	0	0	0	0	0	0	.500	.500	.500	
Jeff Baker	1	1	0	0	0	0	0	0	0	.000	.000	.000	
Jamey Carroll	1	1	0	0	0	0	0	0	0	.000	.000	.000	
Aaron Cook	1	2	0	1	0	0	0	0	0	.500	.500	.500	
Franklin Morales	2	1	0	0	0	0	0	0	0	.000	.000	.000	

==== Pitching ====
Note: G=Games Played; GS=Games Started; IP=Innings Pitched; H=Hits; BB=Walks; R=Runs; ER=Earned Runs; SO=Strikeouts; W=Wins; L=Losses; SV=Saves; ERA=Earned Run Average

Player	G	GS	IP	H	BB	R	ER	SO	W	L	SV	ERA	Reference
Aaron Cook	1	1	6	6	0	3	3	2	0	1	0	4.50	
Franklin Morales	2	0	3	7	1	7	7	1	0	0	0	21.00	
Ubaldo Jiménez	1	1	4 2/3	3	5	2	2	2	0	1	0	3.86	
Jeff Francis	1	1	4	10	3	6	6	3	0	1	0	13.50	
Brian Fuentes	3	0	3 2/3	6	2	4	4	1	0	0	0	9.82	
Matt Herges	3	0	3 1/3	1	2	0	0	4	0	0	0	0.00	
Jeremy Affeldt	4	0	3	2	1	0	0	2	0	0	0	0.00	
Josh Fogg	1	1	2 2/3	10	2	6	6	2	0	1	0	20.25	
LaTroy Hawkins	2	0	2	1	0	1	1	2	0	0	0	4.50	
Manny Corpas	2	0	1 2/3	1	0	0	0	1	0	0	0	0.00	
Ryan Speier	1	0	0	0	3	0	0	0	0	0	0	─	

== Celebration ==
While the celebratory crowd at Kenmore Square was not as unruly as in 2004, cars were overturned and 37 arrests were made. The Red Sox victory parade, yet again in duck boats and called a "Rolling Rally" as in 2004, was on October 30, 2007 with closer Jonathan Papelbon doing his infamous "Irish Jig" while local punk band the Dropkick Murphys played their hit "I'm Shipping Up to Boston".

The Red Sox World Series win in 2007 continued the success of Boston-area teams in recent years. The Celtics won their 17th championship, their first championship since 1986, the last time the Red Sox lost in the World Series, 7 1/2 months later. They would win their 18th championship in 2024. Furthermore, the New England Patriots had victories in 2001, 2003, 2004, 2014, 2016 and 2018, the Boston Bruins in 2011, and the Red Sox three years earlier in 2004 and six years later in 2013 and five years after that in 2018.

== Broadcasting ==
The World Series was televised by Fox in the United States, with Joe Buck and Tim McCarver as booth announcers. The starting time for each television broadcast was 8:00 pm EDT (6:00 pm MDT). The series broke with the recent tradition of starting the World Series on a Saturday, as Major League Baseball had become convinced that weekend games drew lower television ratings. Prior to this season, every World Series since 1985 had opened on a Saturday, with the exception of the 1990 World Series. This was the first World Series to start on a Wednesday since 1968.

Rogers Sportsnet (RSN) in Canada used the MLB International feed with Dave O'Brien and Rick Sutcliffe as booth announcers. NASN showed the games live to most of Europe, while in the UK, all games were shown terrestrially on Five. NHK aired the Series in Japan.

On radio, the Series was broadcast nationally by ESPN Radio, with Jon Miller and Joe Morgan announcing. Locally, Joe Castiglione and Glenn Geffner called the Series for the Red Sox on WRKO in Boston, while Jack Corrigan and Jeff Kingery called it for the Rockies on KOA in Denver. Per contractual obligation, the non-flagship stations on the teams' radio networks carried the ESPN Radio broadcasts.

== Aftermath ==
=== Red Sox ===
The Red Sox won two more World Series titles in 2013 and 2018; both of those titles were managed by two members of the 2007 club. Pitching coach John Farrell served as the skipper of the 2013 Red Sox, featuring 2007 holdovers Clay Buchholz (DNP), Jacoby Ellsbury, Jon Lester, David Ortiz, and Dustin Pedroia. The 2018 Red Sox was managed by Alex Cora, an infielder on the 2007 team.

The Red Sox finished as a wild-card team in the 2008 season, winning 95 games. They were defeated in the ALCS by the Tampa Bay Rays in seven games. The Red Sox again qualified as a 95-win wild-card team in 2009, but lost 3–0 to the Los Angeles Angels in the ALDS. In both 2010 and 2011, the Red Sox missed the postseason despite winning 89 and 90 games, respectively. The 2011 season saw the Red Sox hold a nine-game lead in the wild card heading to September, only to lose 13 of their final 20 games to miss the playoffs. This led to the dismissal of skipper Terry Francona, and the end of an era for Red Sox baseball. By their next championship in 2013, they had both a new general manager and manager.

=== Rockies ===
The Rockies World Series run was nicknamed "Rocktober" — a portmanteau of the Rockies team name and October.

After making the World Series in 2007, the Rockies proceeded to appear in the playoffs only three times in the next 15 seasons with the 2007 season being the Rockies' sole World Series berth. In 2009, the Rockies won a wild-card berth after winning 92 games, but in a rematch of the 2007 NLDS, the Rockies lost in four games to the Philadelphia Phillies. During that season, the Rockies fired Clint Hurdle and replaced him with Jim Tracy. The Rockies never finished higher than third place in the NL West between 2010 and 2017, though in the latter season, they returned to postseason play as a second wild-card team. There, the Rockies lost in the Wild Card Game to the Arizona Diamondbacks. The following season, the Rockies made consecutive postseason appearances for the first time in team history, winning the Wild Card Game against the Chicago Cubs, but losing in the NLDS to the Milwaukee Brewers 3–0.

After managing the Rockies, Hurdle was hired by the Pittsburgh Pirates in 2011, and in 2013, ended a major North American professional sports record 20-year drought without a winning season. The Pirates proceeded to make the postseason three consecutive years under Hurdle, winning the 2013 National League Wild Card Game during that span.

Three members of the 2007 Rockies went on to win a World Series ring with other teams. Outfielder Matt Holliday won in 2011 with the St. Louis Cardinals, pitcher Jeremy Affeldt won in 2010, 2012 and 2014 with the San Francisco Giants, and pitcher Franklin Morales won in 2013 with the Red Sox, and in 2015 with the Kansas City Royals.

== See also ==
- 2007 Asia Series
- 2007 Korean Series
- 2007 Japan Series
- List of World Series sweeps
