= 2007 National League Division Series =

American baseball games

Teams
Team (Wins)		Manager	Season
Arizona Diamondbacks (3)		Bob Melvin	90–72 (.556), GA: 1/2
Chicago Cubs (0)		Lou Piniella	85–77 (.525), GA: 2
- Dates: October 3–6
- Television: TBS
- TV announcers: Dick Stockton, Ron Darling, and Marc Fein
- Radio: ESPN
- Radio announcers: Jon Sciambi and Buck Martinez
- Umpires: Ed Montague, Sam Holbrook, Greg Gibson, Mike Everitt, Mike Reilly, Mark Carlson

Teams
Team (Wins)		Manager	Season
Colorado Rockies (3)		Clint Hurdle	90–73 (.552), GB: 1/2
Philadelphia Phillies (0)		Charlie Manuel	89–73 (.549), GA: 1
- Dates: October 3–6
- Television: TBS
- TV announcers: Don Orsillo, Joe Simpson, and David Aldridge
- Radio: ESPN
- Radio announcers: Gary Thorne and Steve Phillips
- Umpires: Dale Scott, Jim Reynolds, Chuck Meriwether, Jeff Kellogg, Derryl Cousins, Ed Hickox

The 2007 National League Division Series (NLDS) consisted of two best-of-five playoff series on the National League side in Major League Baseball’s 2007 postseason, began on Wednesday, October 3 and ended on Saturday, October 6, with the champions of the three NL divisions and one wild card team participating in two series.

Under MLB's playoff format, no two teams from the same division were matched up in the Division Series, regardless of whether their records would normally indicate such a matchup. Home field advantage went to the team with the better regular-season record with the exception of the wild card team, which defers home field advantage regardless of record. The matchups were:

- (1) Arizona Diamondbacks (NL West champions) vs. (3) Chicago Cubs (NL Central champions): Diamondbacks won the series, 3–0.
- (2) Philadelphia Phillies (NL East champions) vs. (4) Colorado Rockies (Wild Card qualifier): Rockies won the series, 3–0.

Colorado earned the wild card after winning a one-game playoff with San Diego.

Both series represented the first time the opponents had met in the postseason, and the Rockies' victory was their first in any postseason series. The Diamondbacks and the Rockies met in the NL Championship Series, with the Rockies becoming the National League champion and going on to lose to the American League champion Boston Red Sox in the 2007 World Series in a sweep.

== Matchups ==
=== Arizona Diamondbacks vs. Chicago Cubs ===
Arizona won the series, 3–0.

Game	Date	Score	Location	Time	Attendance
1	October 3	Chicago Cubs – 1, Arizona Diamondbacks – 3	Chase Field	2:33	48,864
2	October 4	Chicago Cubs – 4, Arizona Diamondbacks – 8	Chase Field	3:44	48,575
3	October 6	Arizona Diamondbacks – 5, Chicago Cubs – 1	Wrigley Field	3:22	42,157

=== Philadelphia Phillies vs. Colorado Rockies ===
Colorado won the series, 3–0.

Game	Date	Score	Location	Time	Attendance
1	October 3	Colorado Rockies – 4, Philadelphia Phillies – 2	Citizens Bank Park	2:52	45,655
2	October 4	Colorado Rockies – 10, Philadelphia Phillies – 5	Citizens Bank Park	3:32	45,991
3	October 6	Philadelphia Phillies – 1, Colorado Rockies – 2	Coors Field	2:59	50,724

== Arizona vs. Chicago ==
=== Game 1 ===
October 3, 2007 7:07 pm (MST) at Chase Field in Phoenix, Arizona 92 °F (33 °C), roof open; partly cloudy
Team	1	2	3	4	5	6	7	8	9	R	H	E
Chicago	0	0	0	0	0	1	0	0	0	1	4	0
Arizona	0	0	0	1	0	0	2	0	X	3	6	1
WP: Brandon Webb (1–0) LP: Carlos Mármol (0–1) Sv: José Valverde (1); Home runs: CHC: None; AZ: Stephen Drew (1), Mark Reynolds (1); Attendance: 48,864; Boxscore

Eighteen-game winners Carlos Zambrano and Brandon Webb matched each other pitch for pitch in the opening game of the series. The Diamondbacks struck first on Stephen Drew's fourth-inning home run. The Cubs loaded the bases in the sixth on two walks and a hit with two outs, but only scored once on Ryan Theriot's RBI single that tied the game. Carlos Mármol would take the loss in relief of Zambrano, allowing a lead off home run to Mark Reynolds in the seventh, then, one out later, walking Chris Snyder, who moved to third on Augie Ojeda's double and scored on a sacrifice fly by Conor Jackson. Webb pitched seven innings, Brandon Lyon pitched the eighth, and José Valverde threw a hitless ninth inning to save the game for Arizona.

=== Game 2 ===
October 4, 2007 7:07 pm (MST) at Chase Field in Phoenix, Arizona 73 °F (23 °C), roof closed
Team	1	2	3	4	5	6	7	8	9	R	H	E
Chicago	0	2	0	0	0	2	0	0	0	4	8	0
Arizona	0	4	0	2	2	0	0	0	X	8	9	1
WP: Doug Davis (1–0) LP: Ted Lilly (0–1); Home runs: CHC: Geovany Soto (1); AZ: Chris Young (1); Attendance: 48,575; Boxscore

The Cubs struck first in Game 2 when Matt Murton singled to lead off the second off Doug Davis before Geovany Soto's home run put them up 2–0, but starter Ted Lilly in the bottom of the inning allowed a leadoff single to Chris Snyder, then walked Justin Upton before Chris Young's three-run home run two outs later put them up 3–2. Stephen Drew then singled and scored on Eric Byrnes's triple to make it 4–2 Arizona. In the fourth, Lilly allowed a leadoff single to Augie Ojeda, then walked Young one out later before Drew's triple made it 6–2 Arizona and knocked him out of the game. Kevin Hart walked two with one out next inning before being relieved by Scott Eyre, who allowed an RBI single to Ojeda that put Upton at third. Michael Wuertz relieved Eyre and Davis's fielder choice scored another run for Arizona. In the seventh, Davis walked two with two outs before being relieved by Juan Cruz, who allowed a two-run double to pinch hitter Daryle Ward that made it 8–4 Arizona. However, neither team would score for the rest of the game, so the Diamondbacks went up 2–0 in the series heading to Chicago.

=== Game 3 ===
October 6, 2007 5:06 pm (CDT) at Wrigley Field in Chicago, Illinois 86 °F (30 °C), mostly clear
Team	1	2	3	4	5	6	7	8	9	R	H	E
Arizona	2	0	0	1	0	1	0	0	1	5	10	1
Chicago	0	0	0	1	0	0	0	0	0	1	7	0
WP: Liván Hernández (1–0) LP: Rich Hill (0–1); Home runs: AZ: Chris Young (2), Eric Byrnes (1), Stephen Drew (2); CHC: None; Attendance: 42,157; Boxscore

Chris Young's home run on the first pitch of the game off Rich Hill gave Arizona a quick 1–0 lead. Stephen Drew then doubled to right field and after two strikeouts and a walk, scored on Justin Upton's single. Hill would leave the game in the fourth after allowing a lead-off walk and single. Michael Wuertz in relief walked Young to load the bases, then struck out Drew before Eric Byrnes hit into a forceout at second that scored Miguel Montero. The Cubs cut Arizona's lead to 3–1 in the bottom of the inning off Liván Hernández when Mark DeRosa hit a leadoff single, moved to third on Jacque Jones's double, and scored on Jason Kendall's groundout. However, Hernandez would only allow three other hits in six innings. Solo home runs by Byrnes in the sixth off Carlos Marmol and Drew in the ninth off Kerry Wood capped the scoring as the Diamondbacks' 5–1 win completed a sweep of the Cubs, who hit into four double plays.

=== Composite box ===
2007 NLDS (3–0): Arizona Diamondbacks over Chicago Cubs

Team	1	2	3	4	5	6	7	8	9	R	H	E
Arizona Diamondbacks	2	4	0	4	2	1	2	0	1	16	25	3
Chicago Cubs	0	2	0	1	0	3	0	0	0	6	19	0
Total attendance: 139,596 Average attendance: 46,532

== Philadelphia vs. Colorado ==
=== Game 1 ===
October 3, 2007 3:07 pm (EDT) at Citizens Bank Park in Philadelphia, Pennsylvania 81 °F (27 °C), partly cloudy
Team	1	2	3	4	5	6	7	8	9	R	H	E
Colorado	0	3	0	0	0	0	0	1	0	4	6	0
Philadelphia	0	0	0	0	2	0	0	0	0	2	4	0
WP: Jeff Francis (1–0) LP: Cole Hamels (0–1) Sv: Manny Corpas (1); Home runs: COL: Matt Holliday (1); PHI: Aaron Rowand (1), Pat Burrell (1); Attendance: 45,655; Boxscore

This was the Phillies' first postseason game since Game 6 of the 1993 World Series, and their first at Citizens Bank Park. Seventeen and fifteen-game winners Jeff Francis and Cole Hamels began the 2007 postseason by retiring the side in order. The face of the game quickly changed in the second inning when Todd Helton tripled to center field in his first career postseason plate appearance. He would score on Garrett Atkins's double. After Brad Hawpe struck out and Ryan Spilborghs walked, Yorvit Torrealba's single scored Atkins. A two-out walk to Kaz Matsui loaded the bases before another walk to rookie Troy Tulowitzki gave the Rockies a 3–0 lead they never relinquished. Matt Holliday homered off Tom Gordon in the eighth inning to provide insurance after consecutive home runs by Aaron Rowand and Pat Burrell led off the Phillies' half of the fifth. The Phillies wasted an ultimately solid effort from Hamels, who walked four in 6 2/3 frames but did not allow a hit after the decisive second inning. Manny Corpas picked up the save for Colorado.

=== Game 2 ===
October 4, 2007 3:08 pm (EDT) at Citizens Bank Park in Philadelphia, Pennsylvania 82 °F (28 °C), mostly cloudy
Team	1	2	3	4	5	6	7	8	9	R	H	E
Colorado	2	0	0	4	0	4	0	0	0	10	12	1
Philadelphia	1	2	0	0	0	1	1	0	0	5	9	0
WP: Josh Fogg (1–0) LP: Kyle Kendrick (0–1) Sv: Manny Corpas (2); Home runs: COL: Troy Tulowitzki (1), Matt Holliday (2), Kazuo Matsui (1); PHI: Jimmy Rollins (1), Ryan Howard (1); Attendance: 45,991; Boxscore

Troy Tulowitzki and Matt Holliday hit consecutive one-out home runs in the first inning off Phillies rookie starter Kyle Kendrick, but his team responded with Jimmy Rollins' lead-off home run in the bottom of the inning off Rockies starter Franklin Morales, coming off his own rookie season. Rollins' two-run triple next inning gave the Phillies a 3–2 lead. That lead then vanished two innings later when Kaz Matsui hit a two-out grand slam off Phillies reliever Kyle Lohse. José Mesa walked two to lead off the sixth, then Yorvit Torrealba's two-run double put the Rockies up 8–3. After Josh Fogg bunted out, Clay Condrey relieved Mesa and allowed an RBI triple to Matsui. Tulowitzki struck out before Holliday's RBI single made it 10–3 Rockies. Ryan Howard hit a leadoff home run in the bottom of the inning off Jeremy Affeldt. In the seventh, Shane Victorino singled with one out off Ryan Speier, advanced to third on a stolen base attempt and Torrealba's throwing error, and scored on Rollins's groundout. Philadelphia loaded the bases in the eighth inning, but Manny Corpas earned a four-out save in stranding all three runners, sealing the Rockies' 10–5 victory. Matsui was a single short of hitting for the cycle.

=== Game 3 ===
October 6, 2007 7:39 pm (MDT) at Coors Field in Denver, Colorado 72 °F (22 °C), partly cloudy & windy
Team	1	2	3	4	5	6	7	8	9	R	H	E
Philadelphia	0	0	0	0	0	0	1	0	0	1	3	0
Colorado	0	0	0	0	1	0	0	1	X	2	9	0
WP: Brian Fuentes (1–0) LP: J. C. Romero (0–1) Sv: Manny Corpas (3); Home runs: PHI: Shane Victorino (1); COL: None; Attendance: 50,724; Boxscore

The Rockies struck first in the fifth off starter Jamie Moyer when Yorvit Torrealba singled with one out, moved to second on Ubaldo Jiménez's sacrifice bunt, and scored on Kazuo Matsui's triple; the only run Moyer allowed in six sharp innings. Rockies starter Ubaldo Jimenez pitched six shutout innings, but Shane Victorino's home run to right in the top of the seventh tied the game and ended his night. After being released mid-season by the Red Sox, J. C. Romero became one of the most reliable bullpen arms for the Phillies down the stretch by not giving up a single run in 15 2/3 innings pitched in September. Unfortunately for Philadelphia in Game 3, Romero faltered and surrendered three straight two-out singles, the last of which to Jeff Baker scored the go-ahead run in the bottom of the eighth. Manny Corpas came on to nail down his third consecutive save in the ninth, sealing the series sweep. Brian Fuentes earned the win with a 1–2–3 eighth. The last time Philadelphia was swept in a postseason series was the 1976 NLCS, in which Cincinnati beat them, 3–0.

=== Composite box ===
2007 NLDS (3–0): Colorado Rockies over Philadelphia Phillies

Team	1	2	3	4	5	6	7	8	9	R	H	E
Colorado Rockies	2	3	0	4	1	4	0	2	0	16	27	1
Philadelphia Phillies	1	2	0	0	2	1	2	0	0	8	16	0
Total attendance: 142,370 Average attendance: 47,457

== See also ==
- 2007 American League Division Series
