= Terry Francona =

American baseball player and manager (born 1959)

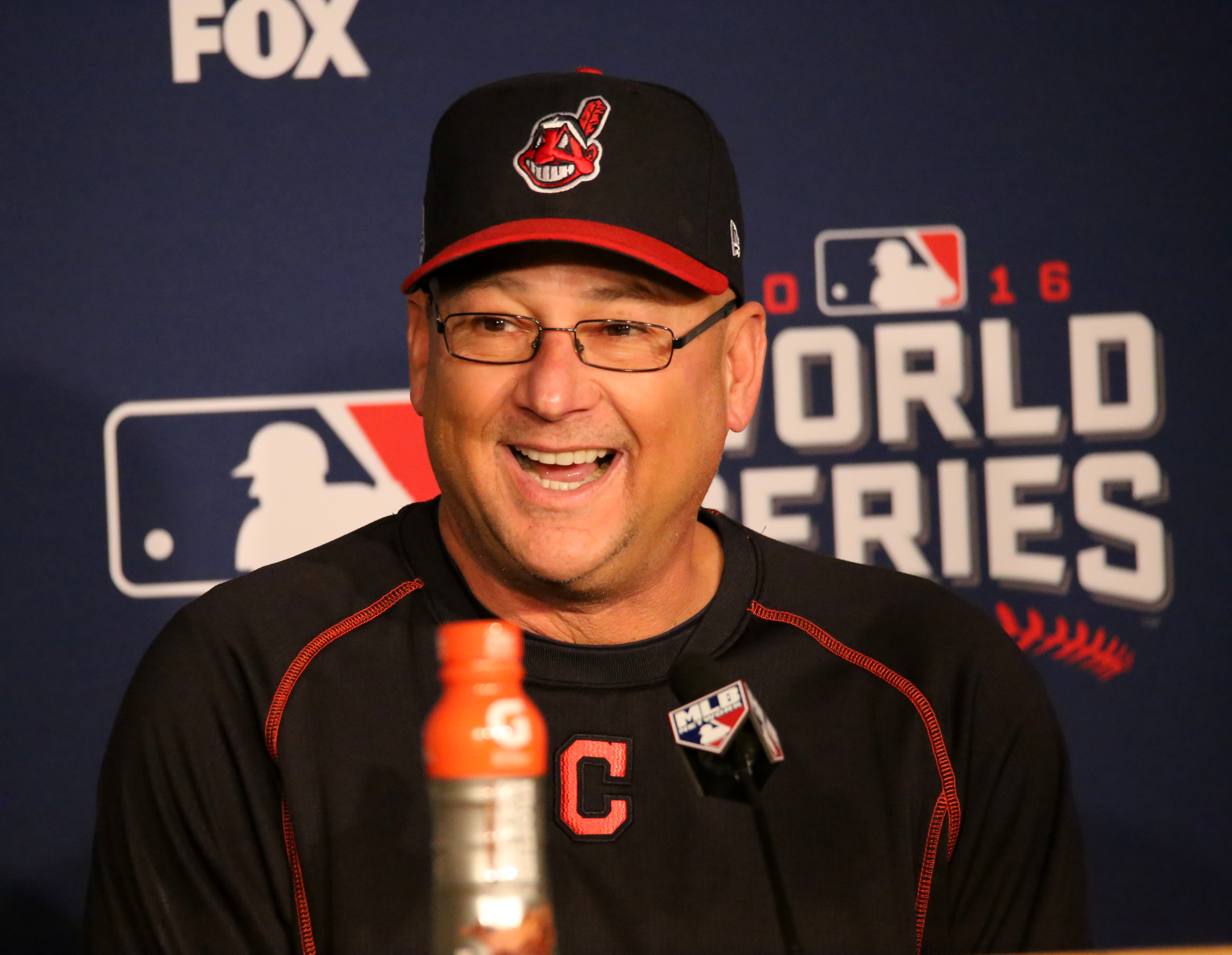
- Francona with the Cleveland Indians in 2016

Cincinnati Reds – No. 77
- First baseman / Outfielder / Manager
- Born: April 22, 1959 (age 67); Aberdeen, South Dakota, U.S.
- Batted: Left Threw: Left

MLB debut
- August 19, 1981, for the Montreal Expos

Last MLB appearance
- April 19, 1990, for the Milwaukee Brewers

MLB statistics (through June 14, 2026)
- Batting average: .274
- Home runs: 16
- Runs batted in: 143
- Managerial record: 2,076–1,803
- Winning %: .535
- Stats at Baseball Reference
- Managerial record at Baseball Reference

Teams
- As player: Montreal Expos (1981–1985); Chicago Cubs (1986); Cincinnati Reds (1987); Cleveland Indians (1988); Milwaukee Brewers (1989–1990); As manager: Philadelphia Phillies (1997–2000); Boston Red Sox (2004–2011); Cleveland Indians / Guardians (2013–2023); Cincinnati Reds (2025–present); As coach: Detroit Tigers (1996); Texas Rangers (2002); Oakland Athletics (2003)

Career highlights and awards
- 2× World Series champion (2004, 2007); 3× AL Manager of the Year (2013, 2016, 2022); Golden Spikes Award (1980)
Medals
Men's baseball
Representing United States
Amateur World Series
| Silver medal – second place | 1978 Italy | Team |

Terry Jon Francona (born April 22, 1959), nicknamed "Tito", is an American professional baseball manager and former player who is the manager of the Cincinnati Reds of Major League Baseball (MLB). He previously managed the Cleveland Indians/Guardians, Boston Red Sox, and Philadelphia Phillies. Francona played in MLB from 1981 to 1988 for the Montreal Expos, Chicago Cubs, Cincinnati Reds, Cleveland Indians, and Milwaukee Brewers.

After a four-year stint as the manager of the Philadelphia Phillies, Francona was hired to manage the Red Sox in 2004 and led the team to their first championship since 1918. He won another World Series with Boston in 2007 and continued to manage the team until the end of the 2011 season. In 2013, Francona became the Cleveland Indians’ manager, leading them to an American League pennant in 2016, a 22-game win streak during the 2017 season (the longest in American League history and the second-longest in MLB history), and became Cleveland's all-time leader in wins by a manager.

== Early life ==
Francona was born on April 22, 1959, in Aberdeen, South Dakota, to Tito Francona (1933–2018), who played in Major League Baseball (MLB) from 1956 to 1970, and Roberta Jackson (1932–1992). He is of Italian descent.

Francona grew up in New Brighton, Pennsylvania, about 30 miles (48 km) northwest of Pittsburgh. He attended New Brighton Area High School and played for the baseball team.

== Playing career ==
Francona attended the University of Arizona, where he played college baseball for the Arizona Wildcats baseball team. Francona also represented the United States at the 1979 Pan American Games. The Arizona Wildcats won the 1980 College World Series and Francona was named the tournament's Most Outstanding Player. Francona won the 1980 Golden Spikes Award.

The Montreal Expos selected Francona in the first round of the 1980 MLB draft with the 22nd overall selection. After briefly playing in the minor leagues, Francona made his major league debut with Montreal on August 19, 1981, a week after the end of that summer's player strike. He appeared mainly as an outfielder that first year, and he went 4-for-12 in the National League Division Series against the Philadelphia Phillies, an extra playoff round used in that strike-divided season. The Expos won that series, three games to two.

Francona shifted to first base, where he ultimately played 100 games more than he had in the outfield. He also developed a reputation as a contact hitter, with few home runs, walks, or strikeouts. The Expos released Francona after the 1985 season, during which his batting average had slipped to .267 after posting a .346 average in limited action in 1984.

Baseball writer Bill James described him as a 'worthless player'.

He went on to sign one-year contracts with the Chicago Cubs, Cincinnati Reds, Cleveland Indians, and Milwaukee Brewers. The Brewers re-signed Francona for 1990, but he only played in three games for the Brewers that year, the last on April 19. In 10 seasons and 708 games, he posted a .274 career average, with 16 home runs and 143 runs batted in. He also made an appearance as a pitcher with Milwaukee on May 15, 1989, late in a game that the Brewers lost 12–2; he threw 12 pitches and struck out one batter (Stan Javier) on three pitches.

== Coaching career ==
After retiring as a player, Francona began coaching, spending several years in the Chicago White Sox organization. In 1991, he managed the Sarasota White Sox of the Gulf Coast League, a rookie league. In 1992, he managed the South Bend White Sox of the mid-level Class A Midwest League. As manager of the AA franchise Birmingham Barons in 1993–95, he posted a 223–203 record and earned several distinctions. In 1993, when Birmingham won the Southern League championship, Francona was named Southern League Manager of the Year and Baseball America's Minor League Manager of the Year. In 1994, the year Michael Jordan played for Birmingham, Baseball America named him the top candidate to make the jump to the big leagues.

Francona managed in the Dominican Winter League with the Águilas Cibaeñas and won the championship and the Serie del Caribe in 1995–96.

Francona became third-base coach for the Detroit Tigers in 1996, working under their new skipper, Buddy Bell, a former Reds teammate of Francona.

== Managerial career ==
=== Philadelphia Phillies (1997–2000) ===
After the 1996 season, he was hired as manager of the Phillies, who had won the NL pennant in 1993 but then had three consecutive losing seasons. In Francona's four seasons (1997–2000) as the Phils' skipper, the club never rose above third place in the National League East. His best finish with the Phillies was 77–85 in 1999. In 1998 and 1999, the Phillies finished in third place, behind the Atlanta Braves and their division-rival New York Mets. He was fired after the 2000 season, finishing his Phillies tenure with a 285–363 record.

Francona spent the following season as a special assistant to the general manager with the Cleveland Indians in 2001, which was followed by two one-year terms as a bench coach for the Texas Rangers (2002) and Oakland Athletics (2003).

=== Boston Red Sox (2004–2011) ===
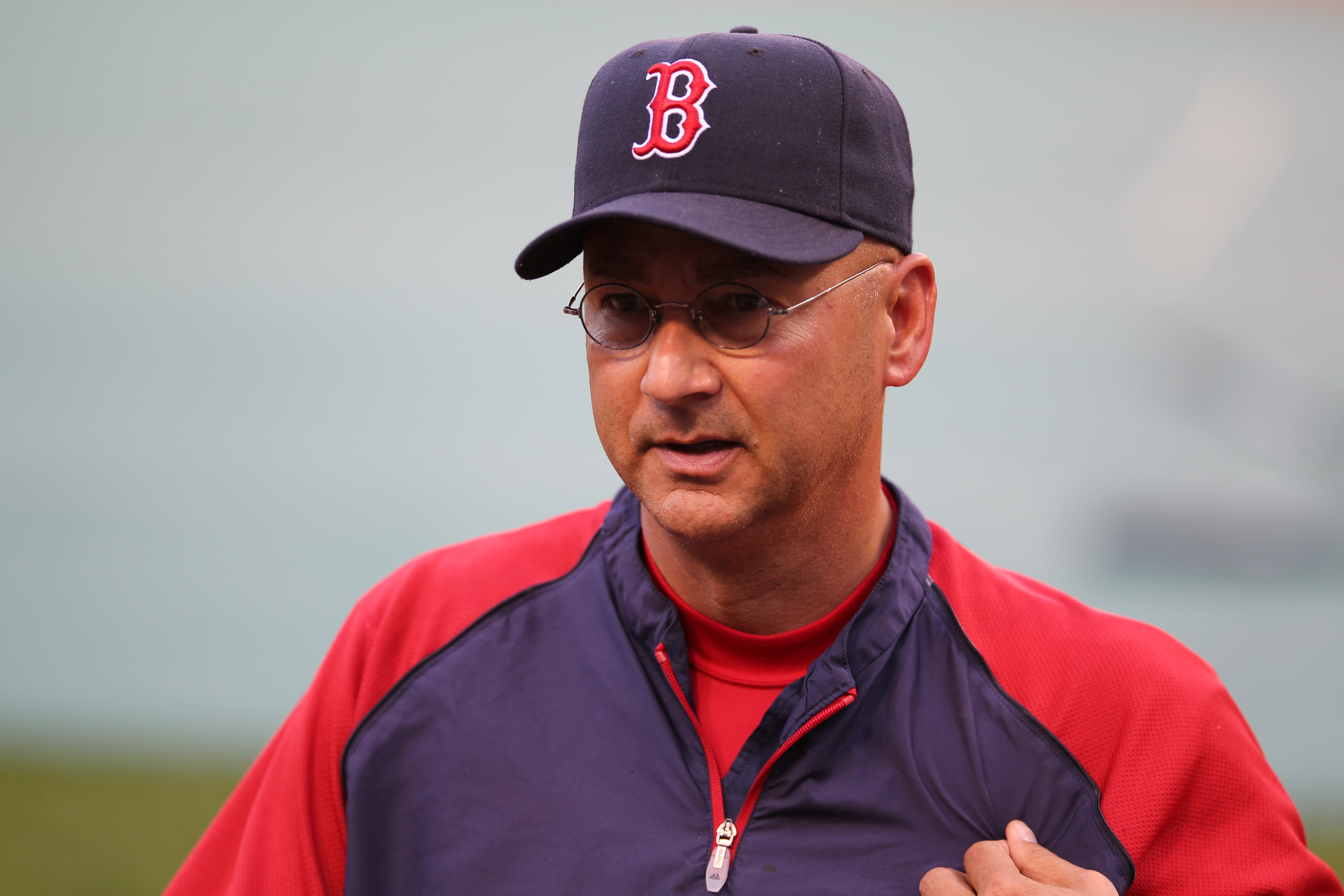
Francona as a manager for the Boston Red Sox in 2011

The Red Sox hired Francona to manage their club in 2004, after the team lost the 2003 American League Championship Series and manager Grady Little's contract was not renewed.

Francona led the Red Sox to a 98–64 record in 2004, the second-best record in the American League behind their biggest rival, the New York Yankees. The club gelled in the second half and won more games than any other team in the American League after the All-Star break. As the American League wild card, the Red Sox swept the AL West champion Anaheim Angels, three games to none, in the Division Series. In the 2004 American League Championship Series, the Red Sox fell behind the Yankees, three games to none, including a 19–8 loss in Game 3 at home in Fenway Park. However, the club regained its composure and won the last four games of the series, the first time in Major League Baseball history that a team rallied from an 0–3 deficit to win a playoff series (only the third team to even make it as far as Game 6, and the first team to force a Game 7 after trailing a series three games to zero). The Red Sox then swept the St. Louis Cardinals 4–0 in the 2004 World Series to win the sixth world title in franchise history, and their first since 1918. The long-awaited victory ended 86 years of frustration for Red Sox fans.

Francona and the Red Sox posted a 95–67 record in 2005, tied with New York for first in the American League East. However, the Yankees were awarded the division due to their 10–9 record against Boston during the season. Once again the American League Wild Card winner, the Red Sox were swept in the ALDS by the Chicago White Sox, who went on to win the 2005 World Series.

The 2006 Red Sox started strong but stumbled in the second half of the season after many key players suffered extensive injuries. The team posted a 23–35 record over the final two months and finished third in the AL East at 86–76, missing the postseason for the first time since 2002. It was also the first time Boston had finished lower than second place since 1997.

Boston rebounded in 2007, winning the AL East for the first time since 1995, finishing two games ahead of the Yankees. Under Francona's leadership, the Sox swept the Angels in the Division Series before dropping three of the first four games to the Cleveland Indians in the ALCS. The Sox, facing elimination, went on to win their next three games, defeating Cleveland to advance to the 2007 World Series, where they swept the Colorado Rockies in four games. Francona is the only manager in Major League history to win his first eight consecutive World Series games and just the second manager to guide two Red Sox clubs to World Series titles, the other being Bill "Rough" Carrigan, who led Boston to back-to-back championships in 1915 and 1916.

On February 24, 2008, the Red Sox announced that they had extended Francona's contract. Instead of expiring at the end of the 2008 season, it would expire after the 2011 season. The team also held club options for 2012 and 2013. Francona was guaranteed a total of $12 million over the first three years of the contract, plus a $750,000 buyout to be received if his 2012 and 2013 options were not exercised.

The Red Sox followed up their second championship of Francona's tenure with a 95–67 record in 2008. Though the Yankees were originally thought to be their top competition for the AL East crown, the surprise Tampa Bay Rays eventually took the division, relegating Boston to the Wild Card. The Red Sox defeated the Angels once again in the ALDS, this time in four games, meeting the Rays in the ALCS. Boston fell behind three games to one in the series but once again staged a remarkable rally. Trailing 7–0 in the seventh inning of Game 5, the Red Sox stormed back with eight unanswered runs to win, the largest single-game comeback ever by a team facing elimination. They then won Game 6 to force a winner-take-all contest once again. This time Boston was unable to finish the job, however, as the Rays took Game 7 to claim the AL Pennant.

As of October 1, 2008, Francona's career regular-season managerial record was 755–703 (.518), while his post-season record was 22–9 (.710). Among managers who have managed at least 20 post-season games, he has the highest winning percentage. Francona won his first seven playoff elimination games (not losing until being swept by the Chicago White Sox in the 2005 ALDS) and first nine ALCS elimination games (not losing until Game 7 of the 2008 ALCS at the Tampa Bay Rays).

On June 2, 2009, Francona recorded his 500th win as manager of the Red Sox, making him the third manager in club history to have 500 wins. The only other two to win at least 500 games as manager of the Red Sox are Joe Cronin (1,071), and Pinky Higgins (560). On May 6, 2010, Francona became the fourth person to manage 1,000 games for the Red Sox.

On July 23, 2011, Francona got his 1,000th win as a manager, but his team collapsed historically in September, finishing 7–20 and squandering a nine-game lead over the Rays for the AL Wild Card spot. Following the season, the Red Sox declined to exercise Francona's 2012 option. He finished his Red Sox career with a 744–552 record in the regular season—second to Cronin in victories, but tops in winning percentage (.574) among those having managed at least 750 games—and 28–17 (.622) in the postseason with those two World Series championships.

=== Cleveland Indians / Guardians (2013–2023) ===
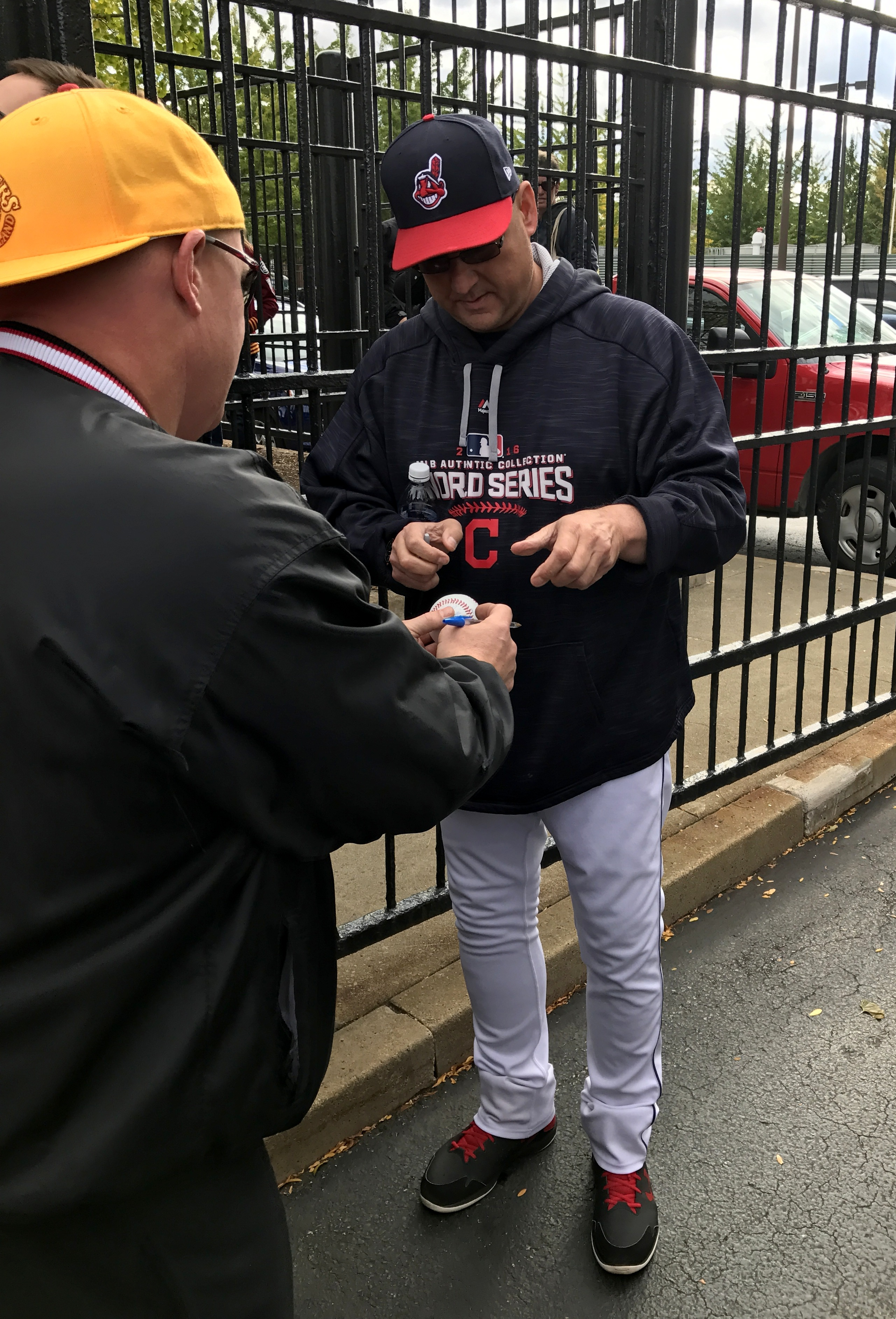
Francona signing autographs during the 2016 World Series

Francona was hired as manager of the Cleveland Indians on October 6, 2012, and officially introduced on October 8. The Indians chose Francona over Sandy Alomar Jr., who had served as the club's interim manager for the final six games of the 2012 season after Manny Acta was fired on September 27. Alomar, who had spent the past three seasons as a coach in Cleveland, and Francona were the only candidates interviewed for the Indians' opening. Alomar stayed in Cleveland on Francona's staff as the bench coach. Under Francona, the Cleveland Indians finished the 2013 regular season with a record of 92–70, which was a 24-game improvement over the previous year. The Indians were eliminated from the 2013 MLB playoffs by losing 4–0 to the Tampa Bay Rays in the American League Wild Card Game. On November 12, 2013, Terry Francona was named as the American League Manager of the Year. Francona agreed to a two-year extension on November 4, 2014. He led the team to a 177–147 record in his first two seasons as Indians manager.

Francona managed the Indians to the American League Central Division title in 2016. His team swept his former club, the Boston Red Sox, in three games in the divisional series—clinching a berth in the ALCS with a win at Fenway Park on October 10, 2016. On October 19, 2016, Francona's Indians beat the Toronto Blue Jays to move on to the World Series, where the Indians won game 1 against the Chicago Cubs 6–0 to extend his World Series record to 9–0. He lost his first World Series game when the Indians were defeated by the Cubs in game 2 by a score of 5–1. The Indians won Game 3 against the Chicago Cubs 1–0. The Indians won Game 4 against the Chicago Cubs 7–2 to give Cleveland a 3–1 lead. The Indians would fall to the Cubs 3–2 in Game 5. Cleveland went on to lose Game 6 by a score of 9–3, then lost 8–7 in 10 innings in Game 7, handing Francona his first World Series loss. On November 15, 2016, Francona was named American League Manager of the Year for the second time in his career.

Cleveland turned in another successful season in 2017, with Francona undergoing a cardiac ablation. The highlight of the season was a 22-game win streak that spanned August 24 – September 15. Of historic proportions, the streak placed second longest all-time in major league history to the New York Giants' 26 consecutive (included ties and suspended games) in 1916. It surpassed the 2002 Oakland Athletics' 20 consecutive wins for the American League record. Dominant in all aspects, the Indians trailed at the end of just eight of the 199 innings, and their run differential of plus-105 (142–37) was higher than all but six teams through that point in the entire 2017 season. The offense produced a .937 OPS, 54 points higher than the next best team, the Twins. The Indians' 1.58 ERA was scaled 1.15 points lower than the next-best club, the Arizona Diamondbacks. Their Central division lead over the second-place Twins swelled from 4 1/2 games to 13 1/2 games. In April 2019, the Indians extended Francona's contract for two more years.

On July 29, 2021, Francona announced that he would step aside from the team for the rest of the year, citing health issues. He had dealt with a gastrointestinal issue in the 2020 season that led to managing just 14 games (Sandy Alomar Jr. served as acting manager and went 28–18); in February 2021, he had toe surgery for a staph infection, and a lingering hip problem also bothered him. Bench coach DeMarlo Hale took over as interim manager.

Francona entered the 2022 season as the longest-tenured manager in MLB with the same team. Also, since Francona had returned to the team, all the games he missed and that were managed by Hale in 2021 got credited to his record, thereby making him the all-time Indians/Guardians leader in wins by a manager (with 753 coming into 2022). In 2022, Francona led the Guardians to their first playoff appearance since 2020 and first AL Central title since 2018. Francona won the 2022 American League Manager of the Year, beating out Brandon Hyde and Scott Servais. On October 3, 2023, Francona announced that he was stepping down as manager, again citing health issues.

==== Callaway controversy ====
Mickey Callaway, an Indians coach from 2013 to 2017, was accused of sexual harassment by five women. On March 2, 2021, a report from The Athletic indicated that Francona, alongside Cleveland president of baseball operations Chris Antonetti, had known of Callaway's behavior. According to the report, an attorney representing the team offered to have Francona speak to an irate husband who had been repeatedly calling the club office to complain about Callaway's interactions with his wife. Although Francona was reportedly aware of Callaway's conduct with the woman, it was not clear that he knew about the attorney's suggestion. Callaway received a one-year ban from MLB; while Francona was not formally disciplined by the league, he did receive criticism from his son Nick, who stated that Terry had lied to him about the proceedings.

=== Cincinnati Reds (2025–present) ===
Francona was hired as the manager of the Cincinnati Reds on October 4, 2024, agreeing to a three-year deal with the club. On July 13, 2025, Francona earned his 2,000th major league win when the Reds defeated the Colorado Rockies 4–2. He became the 13th manager in MLB history to achieve this milestone. In his first season, Francona would lead the Reds to their first postseason appearance since 2020, and first postseason appearance in a non-shortened season since 2013. He also led the Reds to a 5–1 record against his former team, the Guardians, claiming the Reds' first Ohio Cup trophy since 2014.

=== Managerial record ===
As of September 25, 2026.

| Team | Year | Regular season | | | | | Postseason | | | |
| Team | Year | Games | Won | Lost | Win % | Finish | Won | Lost | Win % | Result |
|---|---|---|---|---|---|---|---|---|---|---|
| PHI | 1997 | 162 | 68 | 94 | .420 | 5th in NL East | – | – | – | |
| PHI | 1998 | 162 | 75 | 87 | .463 | 3rd in NL East | – | – | – | |
| PHI | 1999 | 162 | 77 | 85 | .475 | 3rd in NL East | – | – | – | |
| PHI | 2000 | 162 | 65 | 97 | .401 | 5th in NL East | – | – | – | |
| PHI total | | 648 | 285 | 363 | .440 | | – | – | – | |
| BOS | 2004 | 162 | 98 | 64 | .605 | 2nd in AL East | 11 | 3 | .786 | Won World Series (STL) |
| BOS | 2005 | 162 | 95 | 67 | .586 | 2nd in AL East | 0 | 3 | .000 | Lost ALDS (CWS) |
| BOS | 2006 | 162 | 86 | 76 | .531 | 3rd in AL East | – | – | – | |
| BOS | 2007 | 162 | 96 | 66 | .593 | 1st in AL East | 11 | 3 | .786 | Won World Series (COL) |
| BOS | 2008 | 162 | 95 | 67 | .586 | 2nd in AL East | 6 | 5 | .545 | Lost ALCS (TB) |
| BOS | 2009 | 162 | 95 | 67 | .586 | 2nd in AL East | 0 | 3 | .000 | Lost ALDS (LAA) |
| BOS | 2010 | 162 | 89 | 73 | .549 | 3rd in AL East | – | – | – | |
| BOS | 2011 | 162 | 90 | 72 | .556 | 3rd in AL East | – | – | – | |
| BOS total | | 1,296 | 744 | 552 | .574 | | 28 | 17 | .622 | |
| CLE | 2013 | 162 | 92 | 70 | .568 | 2nd in AL Central | 0 | 1 | .000 | Lost ALWC (TB) |
| CLE | 2014 | 162 | 85 | 77 | .525 | 3rd in AL Central | – | – | – | |
| CLE | 2015 | 161 | 81 | 80 | .503 | 3rd in AL Central | – | – | – | |
| CLE | 2016 | 161 | 94 | 67 | .584 | 1st in AL Central | 10 | 5 | .667 | Lost World Series (CHC) |
| CLE | 2017 | 162 | 102 | 60 | .630 | 1st in AL Central | 2 | 3 | .400 | Lost ALDS (NYY) |
| CLE | 2018 | 162 | 91 | 71 | .562 | 1st in AL Central | 0 | 3 | .000 | Lost ALDS (HOU) |
| CLE | 2019 | 162 | 93 | 69 | .574 | 2nd in AL Central | – | – | – | |
| CLE | 2020 | 60 | 35 | 25 | .583 | 2nd in AL Central | 0 | 2 | .000 | Lost ALWC (NYY) |
| CLE | 2021 | 162 | 80 | 82 | .494 | 2nd in AL Central | – | – | – | |
| CLE | 2022 | 162 | 92 | 70 | .568 | 1st in AL Central | 4 | 3 | .571 | Lost ALDS (NYY) |
| CLE | 2023 | 162 | 76 | 86 | .469 | 3rd in AL Central | – | – | – | |
| CLE total | | 1,678 | 921 | 757 | .549 | | 16 | 17 | .485 | |
| CIN | 2025 | 162 | 83 | 79 | .512 | 3rd in NL Central | 0 | 2 | .000 | Lost NLWC (LAD) |
| CIN | 2026 | 162 | 75 | 87 | .463 | 5th in NL Central | – | – | – | |
| CIN total | | 324 | 158 | 166 | .488 | | 0 | 2 | .000 | |
| Total | | 3,946 | 2,108 | 1,838 | .534 | | 44 | 34 | .564 | |

== Broadcasting ==
Following his departure from the Red Sox in 2011, Francona was employed by the Fox network as a substitute color analyst for the first two games of the American League Championship Series. Francona, who teamed with play-by-play announcer Joe Buck, filled in for regular Fox analyst Tim McCarver, who was recuperating from minor heart surgery. On December 5, 2011, Francona signed with ESPN joining its Sunday Night Baseball telecast, replacing Bobby Valentine, who himself replaced Francona as manager of the Red Sox. During the 2012 season, he worked as an analyst on Sunday Night Baseball, contributed to ESPN.com, and contributed to ESPN's Little League World Series coverage.

== Personal life ==
Francona married Jacque Lang on January 9, 1982, and they have four children: son Nicholas and daughters Alyssa, Leah and Jamie. Nick played collegiate baseball for the University of Pennsylvania and for a time in the Cape Cod Baseball League. He was a lieutenant in the United States Marine Corps. In 2003, Nick was drafted by the Boston Red Sox. Alyssa and Leah played on the University of North Carolina softball team. In 2009, Alyssa was a senior and Leah was a freshman on the team. Jamie graduated from the United States Naval Academy in 2016.

It was revealed in October 2011 that Francona and Lang had recently separated and that Francona had been living in a hotel room during the baseball season. Francona later said that he and Lang were in the final stages of divorcing.

He is known for frequently chewing tobacco. Francona and Reds bench coach Brad Mills have been close friends since their college playing days and have worked together as coaches with several teams, including the Phillies, Red Sox, Indians and Reds.

Francona's mother, Roberta, died in 1992. His father, Tito, died in 2018.

=== Health issues ===
During the 2005 season, Francona was hospitalized after complaining of severe chest pains. Tests revealed significantly clogged arteries, but it was concluded that Francona had not suffered a heart attack. This incident, as well as a life-threatening pulmonary embolism suffered in 2002, painful knees, and ongoing treatment for blood clots, has led to circulation issues, which necessitate wearing extra clothes including two pairs of tights. This is also why his regular uniform top is usually hidden by a pullover.

During June and July 2017, Francona missed several games because of feeling lightheaded. He was admitted to the Cleveland Clinic to undergo a series of tests. On July 7, 2017, it was announced that Francona underwent a catheter ablation to correct an irregular heartbeat. Because of the recovery period from the procedure, Francona had to skip the 2017 MLB All-Star Game, which he was due to coach. On July 8, 2017, he was released from the hospital and expected to rest until July 14, 2017, when the Indians started the second half of the season.

Francona missed most of the 2020 season and all of the postseason due to a blood clotting issue. On July 29, 2021, it was announced by the team that Francona would step away from managerial duties for the remainder of the 2021 season to focus on his health and recovery after managing the first 99 games of the regular season for a record of 50–49. DeMarlo Hale served as acting manager for the rest of the season.

== See also ==
- List of Major League Baseball All-Star Game managers
- List of Major League Baseball managers with most career ejections
- List of Major League Baseball managers with most career wins
- List of second-generation Major League Baseball players

Sporting positions
| Preceded by Tommy Thompson | South Bend White Sox manager 1992 | Succeeded by Tony Franklin |
| Preceded by Tony Franklin | Birmingham Barons manager 1993–1995 | Succeeded by Mike Heath |
| Preceded by Dick Tracewski | Detroit Tigers third base coach 1996 | Succeeded by Perry Hill |
| Preceded by Bucky Dent | Texas Rangers bench coach 2002 | Succeeded by Don Wakamatsu |
| Preceded by Ken Macha | Oakland Athletics bench coach 2003 | Succeeded by Chris Speier |
