= Chuck Meriwether =

American baseball umpire (1956–2019)

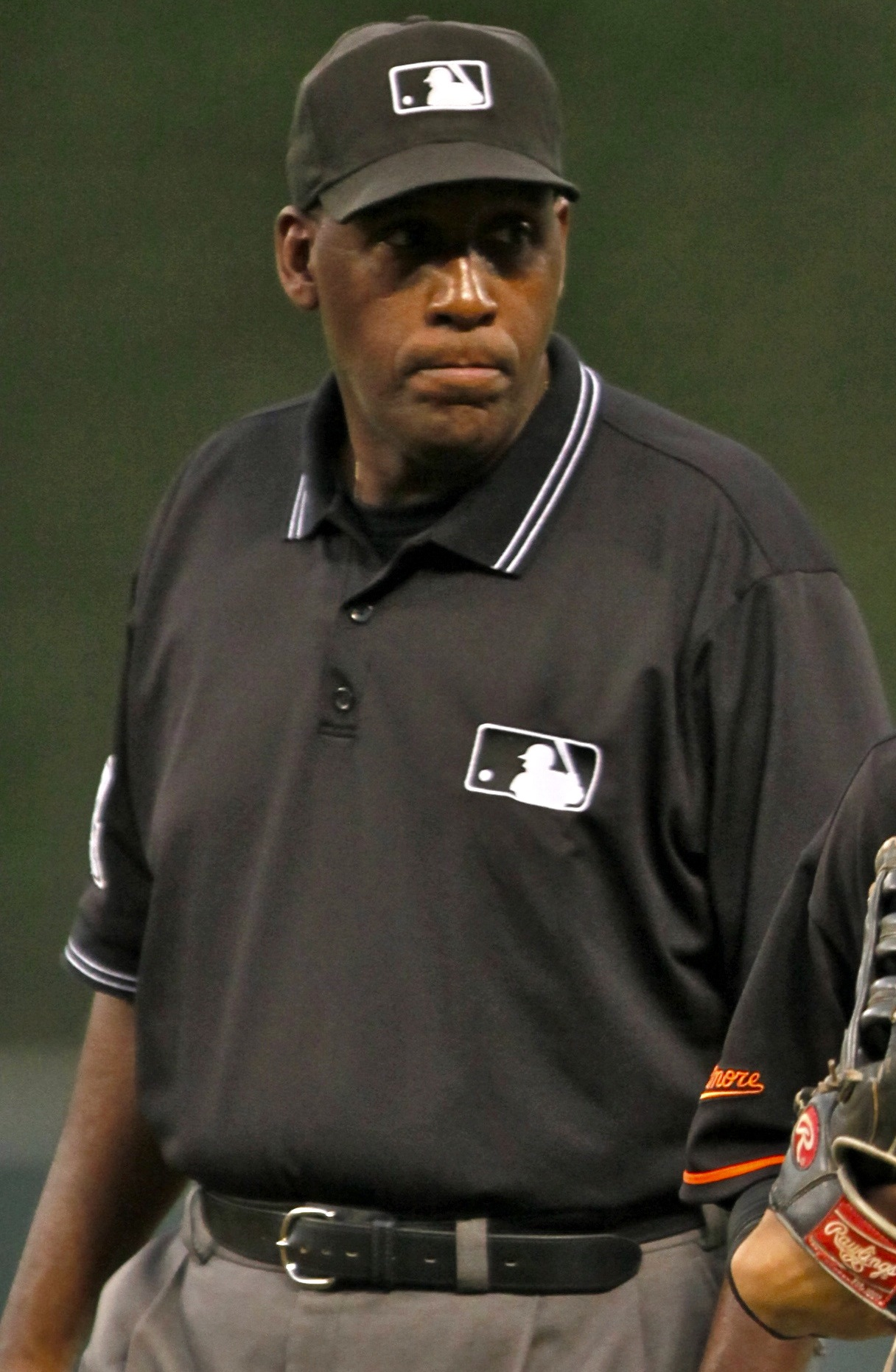
- Meriwether in 2009
- Born: Julius Edward Meriwether; June 30, 1956; Nashville, Tennessee, U.S.
- Died: October 26, 2019 (aged 63); Nashville, Tennessee, U.S.
- Occupations: MLB umpire Umpire supervisor
- Years active: 1987–2009
- Height: 6 ft 5 in (1.96 m)

Julius Edward "Chuck" Meriwether (June 30, 1956 – October 26, 2019) was an American Major League Baseball (MLB) umpire. After working in the American League (AL) from 1988 to 1999, he umpired in both leagues from 2000 to 2009. Meriwether originally wore number 32, but in 2004 switched to number 14.

== Career ==
After graduating from Athens State College in 1978, he first umpired in the minor leagues in 1979, reaching the American Association in 1986 before continuing up to the AL. He was an umpire in the 2004 World Series and the 2007 World Series, and in the All-Star Game in 1996 and 2002. He also umpired in the 2003 National League Championship Series and the 2006 American League Championship Series, and in eight Division Series (1998, 1999, 2000, 2001, 2002, 2004, 2007, and 2009). He was the third base umpire for the single-game playoff to decide the National League's 2007 wild card team. He was the third base umpire for David Cone's perfect game on July 18, 1999, and the second base umpire for Mark Buehrle's perfect game on July 23, 2009.

Upon joining the AL's staff, Meriwether became only the fifth African American umpire in major league history, and the first in the AL since Emmett Ashford retired in 1970. Coincidentally, Meriwether was behind the plate when the Boston Red Sox – the last major league team to integrate its roster – won its first World Series in 86 years in 2004, and he was again behind the plate when they won the Series three years later in 2007.

He worked on the same umpiring crew as Eric Cooper, who died six days before Meriwether, in 2004 and 2009. Before the start of the 2010 season, fellow MLB umpire Mike DiMuro wrote on his "Umps Care Blog" that Meriwether would sit out the 2010 season on the disabled list and then retire following the 2010 season. Meriwether did in fact miss the entire season, and retired along with fellow veteran umpires Mike Reilly and Jerry Crawford on February 23, 2011.

The umpire dressing room at Nashville's First Horizon Park was named after Meriwether in 2016. At the time of his death, Meriwether was a supervisor of MLB umpires.

== Personal life ==
Meriwether's son Chris was a walk-on point guard for the Vanderbilt University basketball team from 2008 to 2010.

Meriwether died at his home in Nashville on October 26, 2019, at the age of 63 after a battle with cancer. Later that evening, there was a moment of silence in memory of Meriwether prior to Game 4 of the World Series.

== See also ==
- List of Major League Baseball umpires (disambiguation)
