= 2007 National League Wild Card tie-breaker game =

2007 Major League Baseball tie-breaker game

	1	2	3	4	5	6	7	8	9	10	11	12	13	R	H	E
San Diego Padres	0	0	5	0	0	0	0	1	0	0	0	0	2	8	15	0
Colorado Rockies	2	1	1	0	1	1	0	0	0	0	0	0	3	9	14	1
- Date: October 1, 2007
- Venue: Coors Field
- City: Denver, Colorado
- Umpires: HP: Tim McClelland; 1B: Ed Montague; 2B: Tim Tschida; 3B: Chuck Meriwether; LF: Fieldin Culbreth; RF: Jim Wolf
- Attendance: 48,404
- Television: TBS
- TV announcers: Don Orsillo and Joe Simpson
- Radio: ESPN; XEPRS (SD); KOA (COL)
- Radio announcers: ESPN: Dan Shulman and Dave Campbell; XEPRS: Ted Leitner and Jerry Coleman; KOA: Jeff Kingery and Jack Corrigan

The 2007 National League Wild Card tie-breaker game was a one-game extension to Major League Baseball's (MLB) 2007 regular season, played between the San Diego Padres and Colorado Rockies of the National League's (NL) West Division to determine the NL wild card. It was played at Coors Field in Denver, Colorado, on October 1, 2007. The Rockies won the game 9–8 in thirteen innings on a controversial play at home plate.

The game was necessary after both teams finished the season with identical win–loss records of 89–73. The Rockies won a coin flip late in the season, which awarded them home field for the game. Upon winning, the Rockies advanced to the NL Division Series where they swept the Philadelphia Phillies. After advancing, they swept the Arizona Diamondbacks in the NL Championship Series, winning their first pennant in franchise history. However, the Rockies were, in turn, swept in the 2007 World Series by the Boston Red Sox, ending their season. In baseball statistics the tie-breaker counted as the 163rd regular season game for both teams, with all events in the game added to regular season statistics.

== Background ==
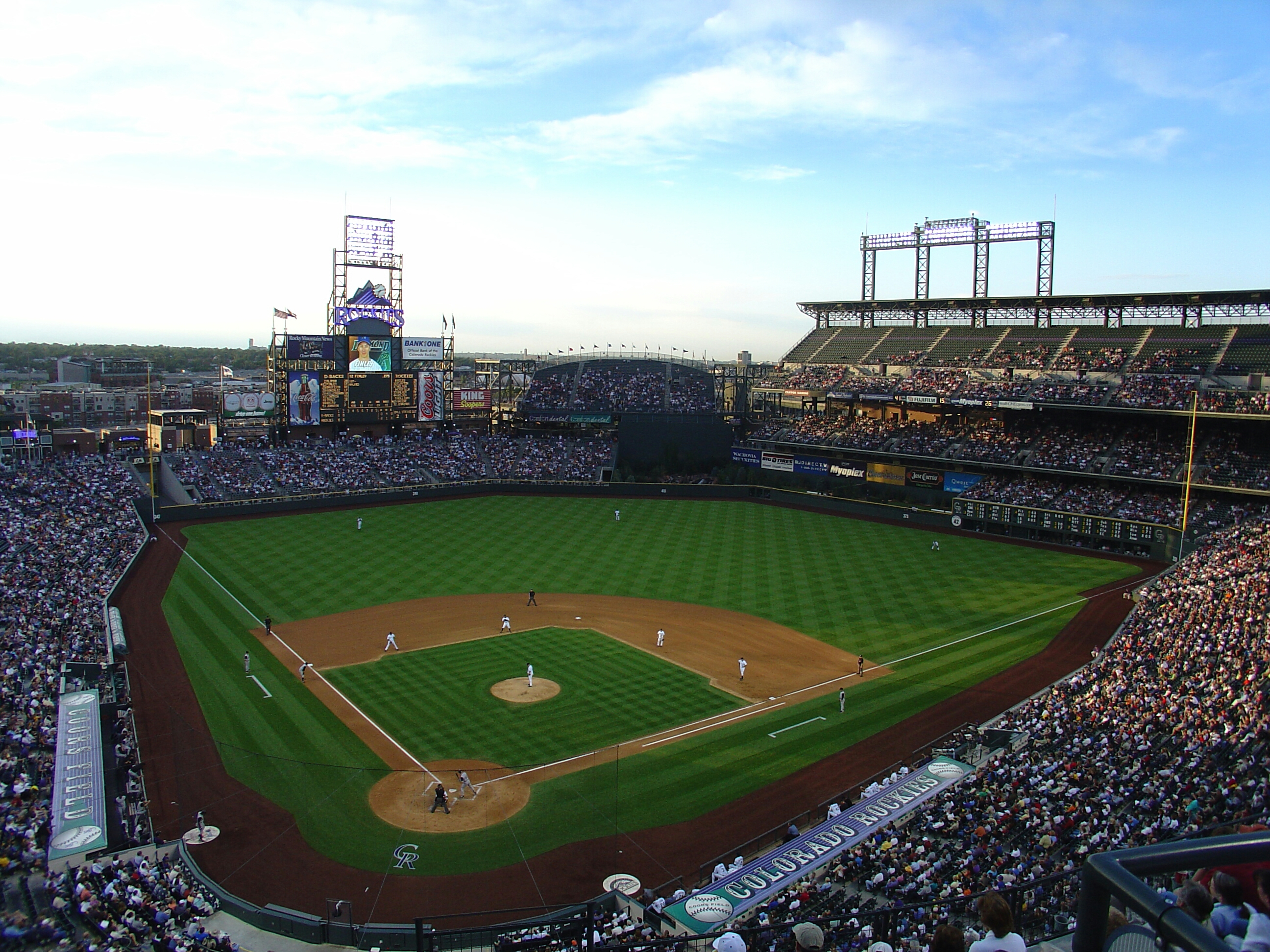
Coors Field played host to the tie-breaker as a result of a coin flip during the season.

The 2007 season saw heavy competition between the Padres and the Arizona Diamondbacks for the National League West Division title. The Padres spent 52 days with at least a share of the lead, while the Diamondbacks spent 89 total days atop the division and ultimately won by a game with a record of 90–72. The Rockies spent just three days, last on April 6, with a lead in the division. Notably the Diamondbacks scored 20 fewer runs than their pitchers allowed, one of just five teams in MLB history to make the playoffs despite being outscored during the season.

In addition to the divisional race, the competition over the wild card continued to the last day of the season. Six teams in the 2007 National League finished within five games of one another: the aforementioned Diamondbacks, Padres, and Rockies along with the Philadelphia Phillies, New York Mets, and Chicago Cubs. The Diamondbacks, Phillies, and Cubs won the West, East, and Central Divisions respectively. Meanwhile, the 2007 Mets underwent what was described in The New York Times as "one of the biggest collapses in baseball history", becoming the first team with a seven-game divisional lead with only 17 games remaining to finish outside of first place, losing the East Division to the Phillies on the final day of the season. Also, at 88–74, the Mets finished a single game behind the Rockies and Padres' 89–73 record in the wild-card race. Had the Mets defeated the Marlins in their final game of the regular season and no other results changing, there would have been a tiebreaker between the Mets and Phillies for the NL East, and the loser taking part in a three-way tiebreaker for the NL wild card with the Padres and Rockies respectively.

While the Padres had been a consistent presence amongst the league's top teams during the 2007 season, the Rockies finished the first half with a .500 record of 44–44. They propelled themselves into the wild-card race, however, by going 46–29 in the second half of the season including a Rockies' season-best 11-game winning streak from September 16 through September 27 and ultimately tied the Padres regular season record. With the Rockies and Padres holding the best non-division winning records in the league a tie-breaker was necessary to determine the wild-card winner. A coin flip conducted earlier that September set the Rockies' home park of Coors Field as the location for the game.

== Game summary ==
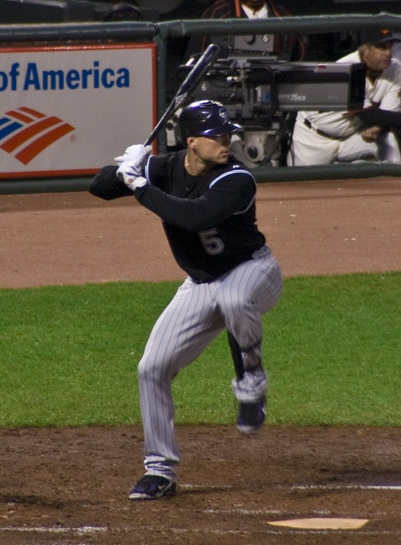
Rockies outfielder Matt Holliday, seen here during the regular season, scored the game's controversial winning run.

Monday, October 1, 2007 5:37 pm (MDT) at Coors Field in Denver, Colorado 74 °F (23 °C), Mostly Cloudy
Team	1	2	3	4	5	6	7	8	9	10	11	12	13	R	H	E
San Diego	0	0	5	0	0	0	0	1	0	0	0	0	2	8	15	0
Colorado	2	1	1	0	1	1	0	0	0	0	0	0	3	9	14	1
WP: Ramón Ortiz (5–4) LP: Trevor Hoffman (4–5); Home runs: SD: Adrián González (30), Scott Hairston (11); COL: Yorvit Torrealba (8), Todd Helton (17); Attendance: 48,404

The starting pitcher matchup saw eventual Cy Young Award and Major League Baseball Triple Crown winner Jake Peavy against the Rockies Josh Fogg, whom teammate Matt Holliday nicknamed "Dragon Slayer" for his strong performances against ace starters throughout the season. The Rockies opened the bottom of the first inning with a leadoff double by Kaz Matsui, followed by a Troy Tulowitzki single and a walk to Matt Holliday to load the bases. Matsui scored on a sacrifice fly by Todd Helton and Garrett Atkins made the game 2–0 with a single which scored Tulowitzki. Yorvit Torrealba later added to that lead, leading off the bottom of the second inning with a home run. The Padres took the lead in the top of the third, however, loading the bases via singles from Peavy and Scott Hairston and a walk to Brian Giles. Adrián González then hit a grand slam, making the score 4–3. This was González' first career grand slam. Khalil Greene then singled, advanced to third base on a double by Josh Bard, and scored on a ground out by Brady Clark. Helton homered in the bottom of the inning to close the gap to 5–4 in favor of San Diego.

The score remained the same through the fourth inning. Fogg was relieved by Taylor Buchholz in the top of the fifth and, following a double by Tulowitzki, Peavy allowed the game-tying run to score on a Holliday single. Seth Smith, pinch hitting for the pitcher in the bottom of the sixth, hit a triple and then scored on a sacrifice fly by Matsui to give the Rockies a 6–5 lead. The Rockies' Garrett Atkins appeared to homer in the bottom of the seventh, extending the Rockies lead, but umpires ruled that the ball hit padding on the outfield wall, which was still in play, and awarded Atkins a double. Jamey Carroll pinch ran for Atkins, but no runs scored in the inning. The Rockies brought in closer Brian Fuentes in the top of the eighth, but the Padres re-tied the game when Geoff Blum singled to lead off the inning, advanced to second base on a wild pitch, and scored on a double by Brian Giles. This was Fuentes' seventh blown save of the season.

The game remained tied until the top of the 13th inning when Giles singled off of Jorge Julio and scored on a home run by Scott Hairston. Ramón Ortiz relieved Julio and no further runs scored in the inning, but the Padres entered the bottom of the 13th with an 8–6 lead. The Padres brought in Trevor Hoffman to secure the game and a wild-card victory. However, Hoffman blew the save, allowing doubles to Matsui and Tulowitzki and a triple to Holliday which tied the game 8–8. Hoffman then intentionally walked Todd Helton leaving baserunners at first and third base. Carroll then hit a line drive to right fielder Brian Giles. Holliday tagged up at third and slid headfirst on a close play at home plate. Home plate umpire Tim McClelland ruled Holliday safe on the sacrifice fly, and the Rockies won the game 9–8.

=== Controversy ===
During the final play Padres catcher Michael Barrett attempted to block home plate from Holliday's slide while receiving the ball on a throw from Brian Giles. Holliday arrived at the plate before the ball did and the ball bounced away from Barrett. Some controversy arose after the game as to whether Holliday had actually touched home plate or if Barrett had successfully blocked him. Several sportswriters, such as Jeff Passan of Yahoo! Sports and Mark Kiszla of The Denver Post, said outright that Holliday never touched the plate. Kiszla referred to the moment humorously, saying "When folks retell this story 100 years from now, he still will not have touched home plate." Padres manager Bud Black and first base umpire Ed Montague both agreed with McClelland's safe call. Barrett said he was unsure but "never, ever second-guessed Tim McClelland at home plate." While the throw got away from Barrett, he quickly retrieved the ball and went to tag Holliday, but stopped short after McClelland ruled Holliday safe and the game over. Holliday said after re-watching the play, he felt a review of the replay would have been inconclusive.

== Aftermath ==
Colorado's win clinched the team's second post-season berth in franchise history, and the first for their first baseman Todd Helton. The Rockies swept the Phillies in the 2007 National League Division Series and the Diamondbacks in the 2007 National League Championship Series (NLCS) to win the franchise's first National League pennant. This streak, in combination with the Rockies performance at the end of the season, meant the Rockies had won 21 of their last 22 games. The last National League team to win 20 of 21 games at any point in the season were the 1936 New York Giants. The Rockies also opened the playoffs with seven straight wins, the 1976 Cincinnati Reds were the only other team in major league history to do so. The Rockies moved on to the 2007 World Series with their NLCS win, where they were swept by the Boston Red Sox.

The game counted as a regular season game in baseball statistics. If Matt Holliday had gone 0 for 5 in the game he would have lost the batting title to Chipper Jones. However, Holliday went 2 for 6 and won the title with a batting average of .340. Also, Holliday's triple and run batted in (RBI) in the 13th gave him 137 RBI in total, winning the RBI crown over Ryan Howard by 1. Holliday's teammate Tulowitzki believed Holliday was the league's most valuable player, but he ultimately finished a close second to the Phillies' Jimmy Rollins in the Most Valuable Player Award voting. Also, Padres' starter Jake Peavy increased his earned run average (ERA) from 2.36 to 2.54 in the game and added six strikeouts to his season total. Peavy ultimately won the National League wins, strikeout, and ERA titles. These titles combined to give Peavy a pitching Triple Crown and he went on to win the Cy Young Award unanimously. Finally, despite an error in the game, the Rockies set the single-season major league record for team fielding percentage (.9893), breaking the 2006 Boston Red Sox mark of .9891.

Conversely, while the Rockies enjoyed a run to the World Series, and have qualified for the postseason three subsequent times since this game (2009, 2017, and 2018 two of which was managed by Bud Black), the Padres would not make the playoffs until 2020, thirteen years later.
