= Fieldin Culbreth =

American baseball umpire (born 1963)

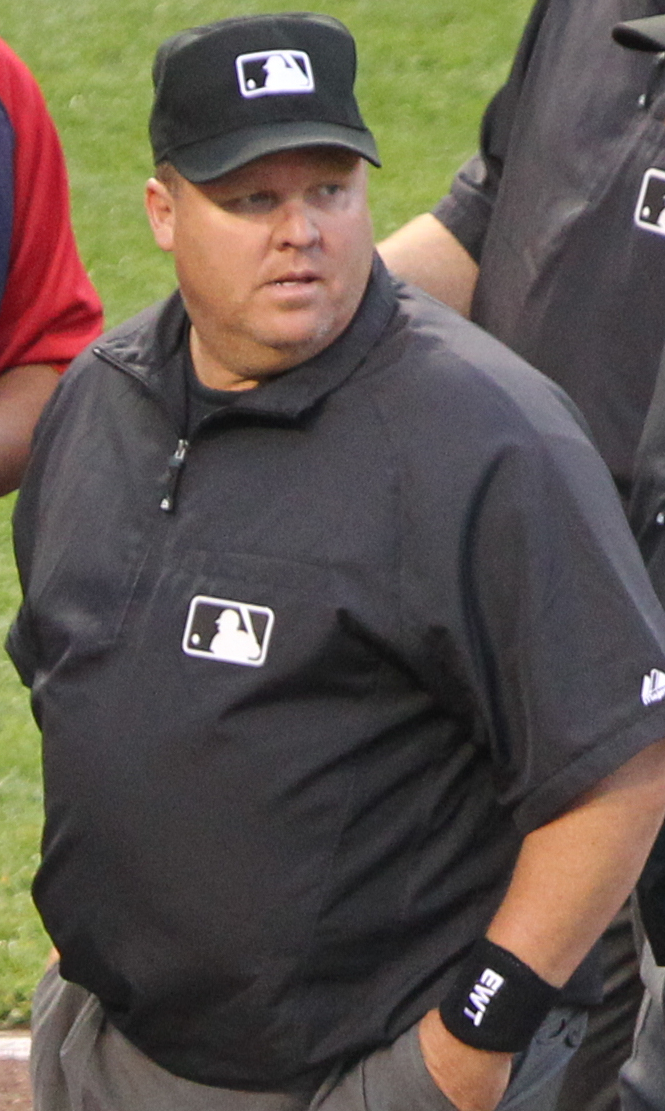
- Culbreth in 2011
- Born: March 16, 1963 (age 63); Inman, South Carolina, U.S.

debut
- August 13, 1993

Last appearance
- October 3, 2021

Career highlights and awards
- Special Assignments: All-Star Games (2006); Wild Card Games (2019); Division Series (2002, 2004, 2007, 2008, 2012, 2014, 2017, 2018); League Championship Series (2000, 2003, 2006, 2009, 2010, 2011, 2019); World Series (2008, 2012, 2018)

Fieldin Henry Culbreth III (born March 16, 1963) is an American former umpire in Major League Baseball (MLB). He worked in the American League from 1993 to 1999 and in both major leagues from 2000 until his retirement in 2021. Culbreth was promoted to crew chief prior to the 2013 season. Culbreth wore number 42 while he was an American League umpire, then changed to 25 in 2000 after the MLB umpires were unified into one crew.

Culbreth has umpired in five Division Series, six League Championship Series, three World Series and one All-Star Game, as well as the National League's single-game playoff in 2007. He has been part of the umpiring crew for two no-hitters, the first in 2010 by Matt Garza of the Tampa Bay Rays and the second by Johan Santana of the New York Mets.

== Early life ==
Culbreth was born and raised in Inman, South Carolina. He graduated from Chapman High School and attended Spartanburg Methodist College before attending the University of North Carolina at Charlotte, where he played baseball. Originally a pitcher and outfielder, Culbreth began umpiring in college following an arm injury.

== Umpiring career ==
Culbreth has umpired in the American League Division Series in 2002, 2007, 2012, and 2014; and the National League Division Series in 2004 and 2008. He officiated in the American League Championship Series in 2000, 2009, 2010 and 2011; and the National League Championship Series in 2003, 2006 and 2019. Culbreth umpired in the World Series in 2008 and 2012. Culbreth has officiated in 87 postseason games through the 2019 season, being the plate umpire for 11 of those contests. He was also a member of the crew for the 2006 MLB All-Star Game in Pittsburgh. The American League defeated the National League, 3–2.

Prior to the 2013 season, Culbreth, Ted Barrett and Jim Joyce were promoted to crew chief positions after the retirement of former crew chiefs Ed Rapuano, Tim Tschida and Derryl Cousins. At the age of 49, Culbreth became the second-youngest active crew chief, with only Barrett younger at the age of 47. Culbreth's 2013 crew consists of Brian O'Nora, Bill Welke and Adrian Johnson.

According to Retrosheet, Culbreth has issued a total of 51 ejections in his major league umpiring career, with a single-season high of six in 1997. Culbreth has officiated over 3,000 regular season games and has served in more than one hundred games each season since 1997.

=== Early career ===
Culbreth had never umpired prior to attending umpire school in 1987. He did not take long to reach the major leagues, where he made his first umpiring appearance on August 13, 1993. On that day, Culbreth umpired at second base in a game played at the Kingdome between the Seattle Mariners and the California Angels.

Culbreth became a member of the official AL umpire staff in 1999, when multiple call-up umpires were hired to take the place of umpires who had participated in a mass resignation. He began his career on the AL staff, but in 2000 MLB merged the umpires from its two leagues. Culbreth initially wore #42 as an AL umpire until it was retired in recognition of Jackie Robinson.

=== 2000-2009 ===
During the 2001 season, Culbreth received an email from then-MLB official Sandy Alderson advising him that he was not calling enough strikes and that if he did not make adjustments, he would face criticism from ESPN analysts when he umpired a game that was broadcast by the network.

Culbreth was part of the umpiring crew when Cal Ripken Jr. of the Baltimore Orioles joined the 3,000 hit club. He was also present when Ripken finally sat out a game after having played in 2,632 consecutive games. Culbreth was the home plate umpire when Baltimore's Rafael Palmeiro reached the 3,000-hit milestone on July 15, 2005 with a double against Joel Piñeiro of the Seattle Mariners.

On September 16, 2005, Culbreth was involved in a dispute with pitcher Randy Johnson of the New York Yankees. At the time, the Yankees were contending for a playoff spot. After Johnson expressed his displeasure with some of the umpire's calls on balls and strikes, Culbreth ejected Johnson in the second inning. Johnson said that he was "deeply regretful" and acknowledged, "I was wrong for letting my emotions get away from me." Prior to Johnson's apology, Culbreth was criticized by Yankees announcers John Sterling and Suzyn Waldman, neither of whom was aware of what had been said on the field.

Earlier in the 2005 season, Culbreth had twice ejected Philadelphia Phillies manager Charlie Manuel from games, once in April and again in August. During the 2001 season, Culbreth had previously ejected Manuel from a contest; it was held during Manuel's time as manager of the Cleveland Indians. Culbreth has also thrown former manager Mike Hargrove out of three different games, with two of the ejections taking place while Hargrove was with Cleveland and the third while Hargrove was managing Baltimore.

Culbreth was the left field umpire for the single-game playoff between the Colorado Rockies and the San Diego Padres that decided the NL's 2007 wild card team. The game ended in the 13th inning when home plate umpire Tim McClelland called Rockies player Matt Holliday safe at home plate; the call was controversial and replays did not show clearly whether or not Holliday touched the plate on the play. Colorado won by a score of 9–8.

In the 2008 World Series, which featured the Philadelphia Phillies and Tampa Bay Rays, Culbreth worked behind home plate for Game 3. The Phillies claimed a 5–4 victory due to a walk–off single by Carlos Ruiz. Philadelphia won the Series in five games. In Game 3 of the 2012 World Series, Culbreth umpired behind the plate for the matchup between the Detroit Tigers and the San Francisco Giants. The Giants shut out the Tigers, 2–0. San Francisco won the World Series in the next game.

=== 2010-2021 ===
Culbreth was the first-base umpire for Tampa Bay Rays pitcher Matt Garza's no-hitter against the Detroit Tigers on July 26, 2010. In the third inning, Tigers manager Jim Leyland was ejected from the game by second-base umpire Marty Foster. Garza's no-hitter was the first by a Rays pitcher. Culbreth was at second base on June 1, 2012, when New York Mets pitcher Johan Santana threw a no-hitter against the St. Louis Cardinals. This no-hitter was the first to be thrown by a Mets pitcher. Santana benefited from a close call on the third base line by umpire Adrian Johnson; the Carlos Beltrán line drive appeared to be fair, but Johnson ruled it foul.

During spring training in 2014, a call by Culbreth was the subject of the first use of expanded replay in an MLB game. After Toronto Blue Jays manager John Gibbons elected to challenge a safe call made by Culbreth, who was umpiring at first base, replay umpire Brian O'Nora upheld the ruling following a video review.

In the 7th inning of a 2013 game between the Houston Astros and Los Angeles Angels of Anaheim, Culbreth, acting as the crew chief for the game, made an incorrect call for which he later received a two-game suspension and a fine. Houston manager Bo Porter made a pitching change, and Angels manager Mike Scioscia called for a pinch-hitter. Porter attempted to make a second pitching change and Scioscia immediately contested it. After discussing the call with his umpiring crew, Culbreth allowed the pitching change, violating MLB rule 3.05(b). He did not serve his suspension immediately, and he continued working regular games in the weeks following the incident.

On September 30, 2021, during a game between the Atlanta Braves and Philadelphia Phillies, a third-party umpiring analysis Twitter bot found that Culbreth correctly called 121 of 122 taken pitches, a near-perfect performance behind the plate. He subsequently received praise from online baseball fans. At the conclusion of the 2021 season, Culbreth retired, ending a 25-year major league umpiring career.

== Personal life ==
Culbreth and his wife Claire have three children: Fieldin IV, Celina and Shannon. As a member of an organization called BLUE for Kids, Culbreth has visited and brought presents to hospitalized children on multiple occasions.

== See also ==
- List of Major League Baseball umpires (disambiguation)
