= Tony Franklin (baseball) =

Anthony Wayne Franklin (born June 9, 1950, at Portland, Maine) is an American manager in minor league baseball and a former infielder in the minor leagues. He spent eight seasons as manager of the Trenton Thunder, Double-A affiliate of the New York Yankees from 2007 to 2014, and led the Thunder to three Eastern League championships (2007, 2008, and 2013) and two additional division titles (2010; 2012). In 2015, he was named manager of the Pulaski Yankees in Virginia.

== Early life ==
Franklin graduated from Centennial High School in Compton, California, and attended Los Angeles City College.

== Career ==
Drafted and signed by the Cincinnati Reds in 1970, Franklin had a nine-year minor league career in the Cincinnati, Chicago Cubs and Montreal Expos farm systems. In his finest season, 1973 with the Trois-Rivières Aigles of the Eastern League, Franklin batted .267 with 27 extra base hits in 116 games. As a player, he was a switch hitter who threw right-handed, and stood 5 ft 10 in (178 cm) tall, who weighed 165 pounds (75 kg). During his nine-year playing career, he batted .231 in 2,740 at bats with 13 home runs and 221 runs batted in.

Franklin's managing and coaching responsibilities began with the Baltimore Orioles in 1979 as a coach with their Rochester Red Wings Triple-A farm club. After three years in the Oriole system, Franklin became a manager in 1982 with the Cubs' Short Season Class A team, the Geneva Cubs of the New York–Penn League. After managing lower-level Cub affiliates for five seasons, Franklin moved to the Chicago White Sox farm system, and eventually reached the Double-A level with the 1991–92 Birmingham Barons. Franklin managed with the White Sox organization in 1989–93. He led the 1991 Barons to the Southern League championship where they lost in the league finals. He also managed the South Bend White Sox to the Midwest League championship in 1993.

He was the minor league infield instructor for the San Diego Padres in 1996–2006 and was interim skipper of the 2000 Las Vegas Stars of the Pacific Coast League before joining the Yankees' organization in 2007 as manager of the Trenton Thunder, a post he held until 2014.

Through 2014, his 19-year minor-league managerial record was 1,220–1,117 (.522) with three league championships. On June 2, 2012, Franklin won his 1,000th career regular season ballgame.

In January 2015, the Yankees named Al Pedrique manager of the 2015 Thunder, but noted that Franklin will remain in the Bombers' organization. He was named the 2015 manager of the Pulaski Yankees of the Rookie-level Appalachian League.

Preceded by Bill Masse	Trenton Thunder manager 2007–2014	Succeeded by Al Pedrique
