= Yorvit Torrealba =

Venezuelan baseball player (born 1978)

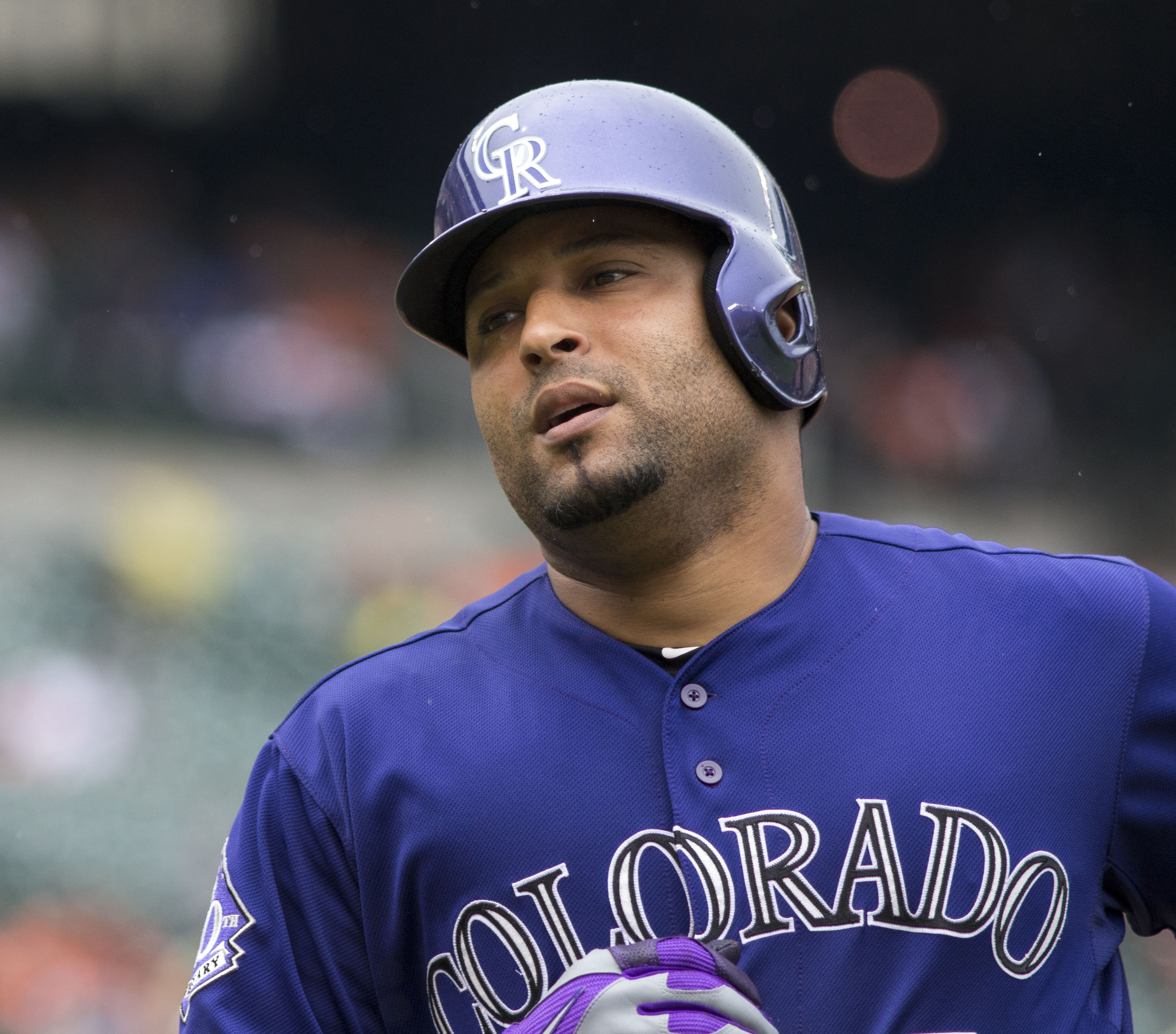
- Torrealba with the Colorado Rockies

Senadores de Caracas
- Catcher / Manager
- Born: July 19, 1978 (age 48); Caracas, Venezuela
- Batted: Right Threw: Right

MLB debut
- September 5, 2001, for the San Francisco Giants

Last MLB appearance
- September 25, 2013, for the Colorado Rockies

MLB statistics
- Batting average: .256
- Home runs: 56
- Runs batted in: 339
- Stats at Baseball Reference

Teams
- San Francisco Giants (2001–2005); Seattle Mariners (2005); Colorado Rockies (2006–2009); San Diego Padres (2010); Texas Rangers (2011–2012); Toronto Blue Jays (2012); Milwaukee Brewers (2012); Colorado Rockies (2013)

Yorvit Adolfo Torrealba ([ʝoɾˈβit toreˈalβa]; born July 19, 1978) is a Venezuelan former professional baseball catcher and current manager of the Senadores de Caracas of the Venezuelan Major League. He played in Major League Baseball (MLB) for the San Francisco Giants, Seattle Mariners, Colorado Rockies, San Diego Padres, Texas Rangers, Toronto Blue Jays and Milwaukee Brewers. He bats and throws right-handed.

== Professional career ==
=== San Francisco Giants ===
Torrealba signed with the San Francisco Giants as a minor league free agent on September 14, 1994. He made his major league debut with the Giants on September 5, 2001, as a September call up. His first major league hit was a triple. No other MLB player would record a triple for his first MLB hit until Jason Perry in 2008. Torrealba became the Giants back up catcher for the 2002 season after a strong spring training. During Torrealba's early career, his defensive abilities were his key strength, particularly his ability to throw out baserunners. He had 136 at-bats in 2001 and 200 in 2002. During the 2002 postseason, Torrealba would still serve as the backup catcher although he made no appearances as the Giants lost the 2002 World Series to the Anaheim Angels.

Yorvit showed some potential, but when Benito Santiago left via free agency in 2003, the Giants opted to trade for A. J. Pierzynski rather than test Torrealba as a full-time player. He continued to serve as the backup catcher when the Giants signed Mike Matheny prior to the 2005 season; in fact, he played less than when Pierzynski was the starter. Torrealba expressed frustration over his lack of playing time to the media more than once, saying he believed he was capable of playing every day. Manager Felipe Alou publicly discussed the possibility of converting Torrealba into a utility player to get him more playing time, but that never came to pass.

=== Seattle Mariners ===
Torrealba was traded, along with pitcher Jesse Foppert, to the Seattle Mariners for outfielder Randy Winn at the trading deadline of the 2005 season. The Mariners were in the midst of a 93-loss season and were rebuilding, and Torrealba competed for the opportunity to be Seattle's starting catcher.

=== Colorado Rockies ===
After the 2005 season, the Seattle Mariners traded Torrealba to the Colorado Rockies for Marcos Carvajal after signing Kenji Johjima to be their starting catcher. With the Rockies, Torrealba had a chance to be the starting catcher, but lost the job after he was injured prior to the 2006 season, establishing Danny Ardoin as the Rockies starting catcher. Torrealba's injury was a lingering shoulder injury that was caused by overtraining.

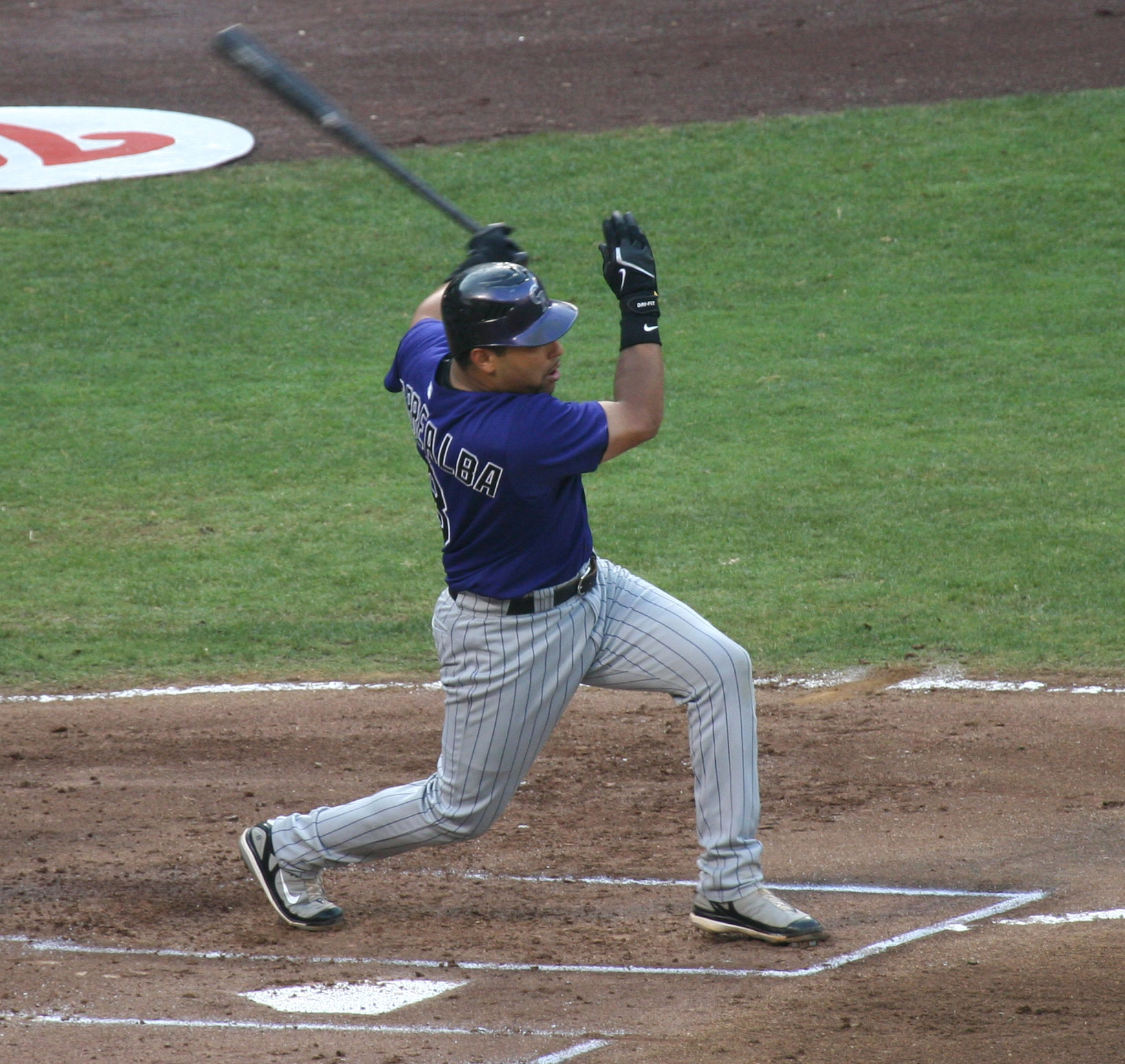
Torrealba batting for the Colorado Rockies in 2007

During November 2007, rumors that Torrealba would sign with the Mets intensified. Torrealba and the Mets agreed on a deal for $14.4 million over three years. The deal had seemed to be done, but with the failing of Yorvit's physical he was never sent to New York. Torrealba would later file a grievance against the Mets. On November 29, 2007, he re-signed with the Rockies.

Torrealba began the 2007 season for the Rockies platooning with rookie catcher Chris Iannetta. When Iannetta struggled, Torrealba won the starting job. On May 29, 2007, against the St. Louis Cardinals, Torrealba hit a grand slam, the 3rd of his career. He finished the season with a .255 average and 47 RBIs in 396 at-bats and he threw out only 17 percent of potential base-stealers, down from his success in previous seasons. Torrealba had some big hits for the Rockies during late 2007, when the Rockies won 12 of their last 13 to force a one-game playoff against the San Diego Padres, which the Rockies won. Torrealba homered off Jake Peavy in that game. Torrealba also hit a 3-run home run off of former teammate Liván Hernández in Game 3 of the 2007 National League Championship Series. Torrealba led the Rockies to the World Series for the first time ever but lost the series to the Boston Red Sox in a 4-game sweep.

Through the 2007 season, Torrealba posted a career .251 batting average with 30 home runs and 173 RBIs in 440 games. As a catcher, he compiled a .997 fielding average with only seventeen errors in 2587 chances; Torrealba's defense has been above average throughout his career. He has thrown out over 32% of all baserunners attempting to steal. His ability to throw out runners was a career low 19.7% in 2007. Due to his impressive postseason play, Torrealba has recently been dubbed "Mr. Rocktober."

Torrealba has an unusual throwing motion, as he brings his hand to earside and then snaps his arm in a quick motion, although it seems to work for him, given his success at throwing out baserunners.

On November 6, 2009, the Rockies decided to go with youngster Chris Iannetta as their primary catcher and declined their 2010 contract option with Torrealba, making him a free agent.

=== San Diego Padres ===
On February 9, 2010, Torrealba and the San Diego Padres signed a one-year contract with a mutual option for a second year. In 2010, he batted .271, and led the league's catchers in fielding percentage, at .996. Following the season, Torrealba declined the option, but was later offered arbitration by the Padres.

=== Texas Rangers ===
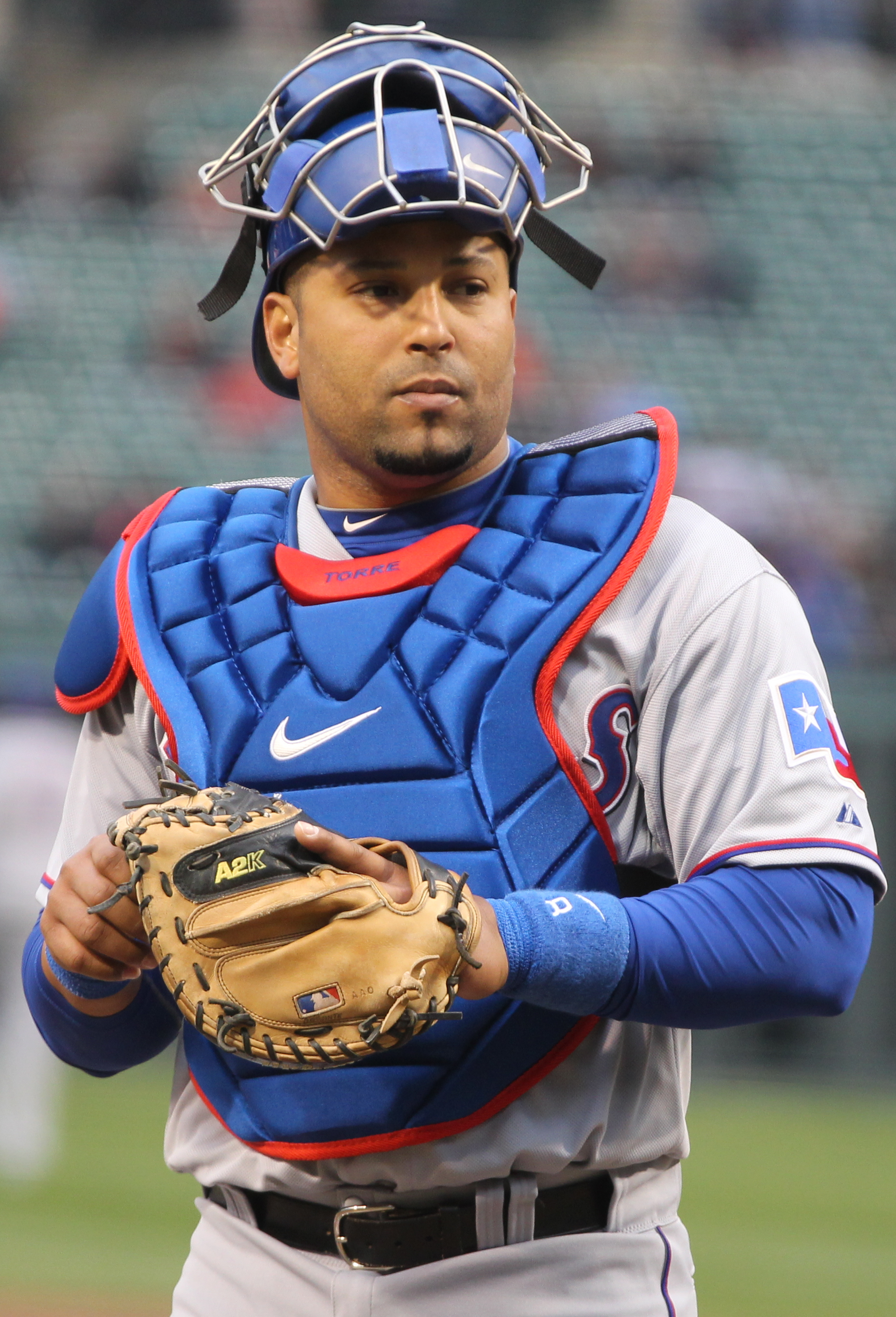
Torrealba playing for the Texas Rangers in 2011

Torrealba agreed to a two-year contract with the Texas Rangers for $6.25 million. Torrealba homered in his second game with his new team.

In 2011, he batted .273 with 7 home runs. On defense, he was third in the league in errors by a catcher, totalling 9 errors. Torrealba led the Rangers into the postseason until the team lost the 2011 World Series against the St. Louis Cardinals.

On July 30, 2012, Torrealba was designated for assignment by the Texas Rangers He was released on August 8, 2012.

=== Toronto Blue Jays ===
On August 14, 2012, Torrealba signed a minor league contract with the Toronto Blue Jays, and reported to the New Hampshire Fisher Cats. Torrealba was added to the 40 man roster and called up to the Blue Jays on August 21. On August 22, Torrealba played first base for the first time in his career.

=== Milwaukee Brewers ===
On September 21, 2012, Torrealba was traded to the Milwaukee Brewers for cash considerations or a player to be named later. He ended up appearing in five games for the Brewers, going 0-for-5 at the plate with one walk.

=== Colorado Rockies (second stint) ===
On January 24, 2013, Torrealba signed a minor league contract with the Colorado Rockies. He had his contract selected to the major league roster on March 29. In 61 games, Torrealba batted .240 and had 8 doubles and 16 RBIs for the Rockies.

=== Los Angeles Angels of Anaheim ===
On January 31, 2014, Torrealba signed a minor league contract with the Los Angeles Angels of Anaheim. He was released on March 23.

=== Chicago Cubs ===
On June 12, 2014, Torrealba signed a minor league contract with the Chicago Cubs. He was released on July 17.

== Personal life ==
Torrealba's parents gave him his name when they could not decide between Yorman and Victor. They decided to combine the two into "Yorvit". Torrealba's parents still reside in Venezuela.

Torrealba has two sons named Yorvis Eduardo Torrealba (1997) and Julian Xavier Houston-Torrealba (2000). In June 2009, Yorvit Torrealba was unexpectedly placed on the Rockies' restricted list. On June 4, 2009, it was announced that the reason for his absence was that his 11-year-old son and "his two uncles" had been kidnapped. The abductors set Yorvis and the other family members free without picking up the $50,000 that had been agreed upon. He then moved his son out of Venezuela to Miami. Yorvis Eduardo tossed the first pitch in the third game of the 2009 National League Division Series against the Phillies, and he was drafted by the Rockies in the 20th round of the 2019 MLB draft.

== Controversy ==
On December 23, 2011, while playing for the Leones del Caracas in the Venezuelan Winter League regular season, Torrealba argued heatedly following a strikeout. He then was ejected by umpire Dario Rivero, Jr. Before leaving, he delivered a shot to Rivero in the head. Torrealba claimed that his attack on the umpire was because of a disputed strike call prior to striking out. As a result, the league suspended Torrealba for 66 games, which did not carry over to Major League Baseball or any other baseball circuit.

== See also ==
- List of players from Venezuela in Major League Baseball
