= 2007 Colorado Rockies season =

2007 Colorado Rockies
- National League champions National League Wild Card winners
- League: National League
- Division: West
- Ballpark: Coors Field
- City: Denver, Colorado
- Record: 90–73 (.552)
- Divisional place: 2nd
- Owners: Charles & Richard Monfort
- General manager: Dan O'Dowd
- Manager: Clint Hurdle
- Television: FSN Rocky Mountain; KTVD (My20); Drew Goodman, Jeff Huson, George Frazier
- Radio: KOA (AM); Jeff Kingery, Jack Corrigan
- Stats: ESPN.com; Baseball Reference

The Colorado Rockies' 2007 season started off with the team trying to improve on their 2006 record (76-86). They finished second in the National League West with a franchise record of 90 wins in 163 games and earned a playoff berth as the National League Wild Card team, in what was the Rockies' first postseason berth since 1995, and their first winning season since 2000. The team would go on to lose the World Series to the Boston Red Sox, four games to none.

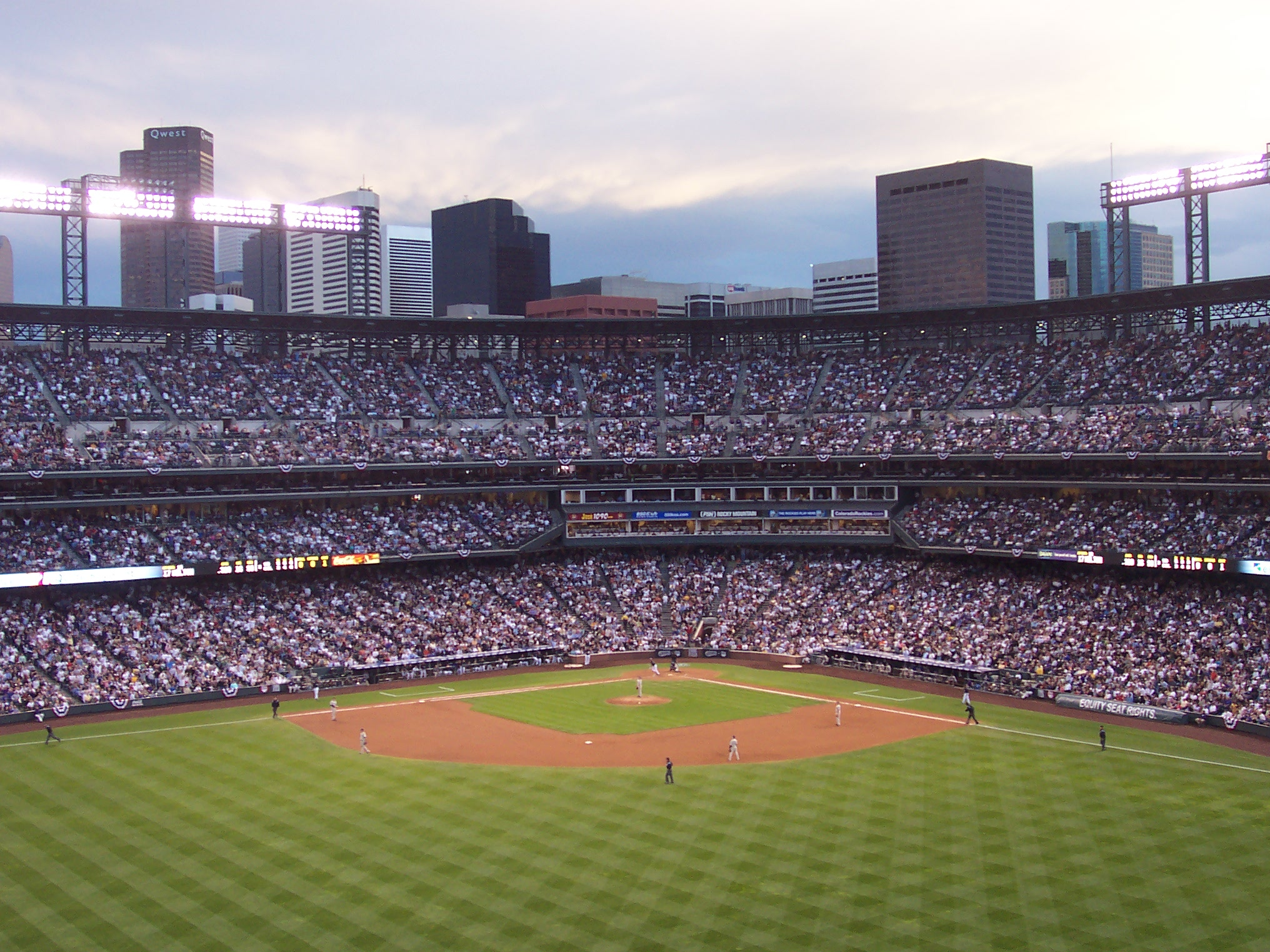
Coors Field in October 2007

The team's stretch run was among the greatest ever for a Major League Baseball team. Having a record of 76–72 at the start of play on September 16, the Rockies proceeded to win 14 of their final 15 regular season games to win the wild card. The stretch culminated with a 9–8, 13-inning victory over the San Diego Padres in a one-game playoff for the wild card berth, a game that is considered to be part of the regular season. The Rockies then swept their first seven playoff games to win the National League pennant — the franchise's first-ever pennant. Thus, at the start of the World Series, the Rockies had won a total of 21 out of 22 games. Fans and media nicknamed the Rockies' improbable run in October 'Rocktober'.

The streak then ended, as the Rockies were swept in the World Series by the Boston Red Sox. The Rockies drew 2,376,250 fans for the season, their highest total since 2002. The average home attendance was 28,978.

As of today, this is the only season the Rockies have ever made the World Series.

== Offseason ==
- December 5, 2006: LaTroy Hawkins was signed as a free agent by the Colorado Rockies.
- December 12, 2006: Jason Jennings was traded by the Colorado Rockies with Miguel Asencio to the Houston Astros for Willy Taveras, Taylor Buchholz and Jason Hirsh.
- January 30, 2007: Choo Freeman was released by the Colorado Rockies.
- February 18, 2007: Matt Herges was signed as a free agent by the Colorado Rockies.
- February 24, 2007: Steve Finley was signed as a free agent by the Colorado Rockies.

== Regular season ==
=== Season standings ===
NL West
| Team | W | L | Pct. | GB | Home | Road |
|---|---|---|---|---|---|---|
| Arizona Diamondbacks | 90 | 72 | .556 | — | 50‍–‍31 | 40‍–‍41 |
| Colorado Rockies | 90 | 73 | .552 | ½ | 51‍–‍31 | 39‍–‍42 |
| San Diego Padres | 89 | 74 | .546 | 1½ | 47‍–‍34 | 42‍–‍40 |
| Los Angeles Dodgers | 82 | 80 | .506 | 8 | 43‍–‍38 | 39‍–‍42 |
| San Francisco Giants | 71 | 91 | .438 | 19 | 39‍–‍42 | 32‍–‍49 |

=== Wild Card standings ===
| Team | W | L | Pct. | GB |
|---|---|---|---|---|
| Colorado Rockies | 90 | 73 | .552 | — |
| San Diego Padres | 89 | 74 | .546 | 1 |
| New York Mets | 88 | 74 | .543 | 1½ |
| Atlanta Braves | 84 | 78 | .518 | 5½ |
| Milwaukee Brewers | 83 | 79 | .512 | 6½ |
| Los Angeles Dodgers | 82 | 80 | .506 | 7½ |
| St. Louis Cardinals | 78 | 84 | .481 | 11½ |
| Washington Nationals | 73 | 89 | .451 | 16½ |
| Houston Astros | 73 | 89 | .451 | 16½ |
| Cincinnati Reds | 72 | 90 | .444 | 17½ |
| San Francisco Giants | 71 | 91 | .438 | 18½ |
| Florida Marlins | 71 | 91 | .438 | 18½ |
| Pittsburgh Pirates | 68 | 94 | .420 | 21½ |

=== Wild card tie-breaker ===
The Rockies ended the 162-game regular season with 89 wins and 73 losses. They were tied with the San Diego Padres for second place in the NL West and first in the NL Wild Card. A tie-breaker game was played on October 1, 2007, at Coors Field in Denver to determine which team would continue on to post-season play. The game lasted 13 innings, spanning four hours and 40 minutes. The Rockies won the game with a controversial play at home plate where Matt Holliday appeared to not touch home plate but was called safe resulting in a final score of 9–8, sending them to only their second post-season in franchise history. The tie-breaker game counts toward all team and player statistics in the regular season; so, the Rockies' official 2007 win–loss record stands at 90-73.

=== Record vs. opponents ===
2007 National League record Source: MLB Standings Grid – 2007
| Team | AZ | ATL | CHC | CIN | COL | FLA | HOU | LAD | MIL | NYM | PHI | PIT | SD | SF | STL | WAS | AL |
|---|---|---|---|---|---|---|---|---|---|---|---|---|---|---|---|---|---|
| Arizona | — | 4–2 | 4–2 | 2–4 | 8–10 | 6–1 | 5–2 | 8–10 | 2–5 | 3–4 | 5–1 | 5–4 | 10–8 | 10–8 | 4–3 | 6–1 | 8–7 |
| Atlanta | 2–4 | — | 5–4 | 1–6 | 4–2 | 10–8 | 3–3 | 4–3 | 5–2 | 9–9 | 9–9 | 5–1 | 5–2 | 4–3 | 3–4 | 11–7 | 4–11 |
| Chicago | 2–4 | 4–5 | — | 9–9 | 5–2 | 0–6 | 8–7 | 2–5 | 9–6 | 2–5 | 3–4 | 8–7 | 3–5 | 5–2 | 11–5 | 6–1 | 8–4 |
| Cincinnati | 4–2 | 6–1 | 9–9 | — | 2–4 | 4–3 | 4–11 | 2–4 | 8–7 | 2–5 | 2–4 | 9–7 | 2–4 | 4–3 | 6–9 | 1–6 | 7–11 |
| Colorado | 10–8 | 2–4 | 2–5 | 4–2 | — | 3–3 | 3–4 | 12–6 | 4–2 | 4–2 | 4–3 | 4–3 | 11–8 | 10–8 | 3–4 | 4–3 | 10–8 |
| Florida | 1–6 | 8–10 | 6–0 | 3–4 | 3–3 | — | 2–3 | 4–3 | 2–5 | 7–11 | 9–9 | 3–4 | 3–4 | 1–6 | 2–4 | 8–10 | 9–9 |
| Houston | 2–5 | 3–3 | 7–8 | 11–4 | 4–3 | 3–2 | — | 4–3 | 5–13 | 2–5 | 3–3 | 5–10 | 4–3 | 2–4 | 7–9 | 2–5 | 9–9 |
| Los Angeles | 10–8 | 3–4 | 5–2 | 4–2 | 6–12 | 3–4 | 3–4 | — | 3–3 | 5–5 | 4–2 | 5–2 | 8–10 | 10–8 | 3–3 | 5–1 | 5–10 |
| Milwaukee | 5–2 | 2–5 | 6–9 | 7–8 | 2–4 | 5–2 | 13–5 | 3–3 | — | 2–4 | 3–4 | 10–6 | 2–5 | 4–5 | 7–8 | 4–2 | 8–7 |
| New York | 4–3 | 9–9 | 5–2 | 5–2 | 2–4 | 11–7 | 5–2 | 5–5 | 4–2 | — | 6–12 | 4–2 | 2–4 | 4–2 | 5–2 | 9–9 | 8–7 |
| Philadelphia | 1–5 | 9–9 | 4–3 | 4–2 | 3–4 | 9–9 | 3–3 | 2–4 | 4–3 | 12–6 | — | 4–2 | 4–3 | 4–4 | 6–3 | 12–6 | 8–7 |
| Pittsburgh | 4–5 | 1–5 | 7–8 | 7–9 | 3–4 | 4–3 | 10–5 | 2–5 | 6–10 | 2–4 | 2–4 | — | 1–6 | 4–2 | 6–12 | 4–2 | 5–10 |
| San Diego | 8–10 | 2–5 | 5–3 | 4–2 | 8–11 | 4–3 | 3–4 | 10–8 | 5–2 | 4–2 | 3–4 | 6–1 | — | 14–4 | 3–4 | 4–2 | 6–9 |
| San Francisco | 8–10 | 3–4 | 2–5 | 3–4 | 8–10 | 6–1 | 4–2 | 8–10 | 5–4 | 2–4 | 4–4 | 2–4 | 4–14 | — | 4–1 | 3–4 | 5–10 |
| St. Louis | 3–4 | 4–3 | 5–11 | 9–6 | 4–3 | 4–2 | 9–7 | 3–3 | 8–7 | 2–5 | 3–6 | 12–6 | 4–3 | 1–4 | — | 1–5 | 6–9 |
| Washington | 1–6 | 7–11 | 1–6 | 6–1 | 3–4 | 10–8 | 5–2 | 1–5 | 2–4 | 9–9 | 6–12 | 2–4 | 2–4 | 4–3 | 5–1 | — | 9–9 |

=== Transactions ===
- May 13, 2007: Byung-hyun Kim was traded by the Colorado Rockies to the Florida Marlins for Jorge Julio.
- June 13, 2007: Steve Finley was released by the Colorado Rockies.
- August 15, 2007: Ramón Ortiz was traded by the Minnesota Twins to the Colorado Rockies for Matt Macri.
- August 19, 2007: Mark Redman was signed as a free agent by the Colorado Rockies.

=== Major League debuts ===
- Batters:
  - Sean Barker (Jun 6)
  - Edwin Bellorín (Aug 7)
  - Ian Stewart (Aug 11)
  - Joe Koshansky (Sep 1)
  - Seth Smith (Sep 16)
- Pitchers:
  - Zach McClellan (Apr 16)
  - Alberto Árias (May 1)
  - Darren Clarke (May 18)
  - Franklin Morales (Aug 18)
  - Josh Newman (Sep 12)

=== Roster ===
2007 Colorado Rockies
Roster
| Pitchers: 41 Jeremy Affeldt; 44 Alberto Arias; 54 Denny Bautista; 35 Taylor Buchholz; 99 Darren Clarke; 28 Aaron Cook; 60 Manny Corpas; 39 Elmer Dessens; 37 Josh Fogg; 26 Jeff Francis; 40 Brian Fuentes; 49 Tim Harikkala; 32 LaTroy Hawkins; 34 Matt Herges; 48 Jason Hirsh; 38 Ubaldo Jiménez; 50 Jorge Julio; 25 Bobby Keppel; 49 Byung-hyun Kim; 31 Rodrigo López; 39 Tom Martin; 46 Zach McClellan; 56 Franklin Morales; 51 Juan Morillo; 45 Josh Newman; 44 Ramón Ortiz; 61 Ramón Ramírez; 55 Mark Redman; 29 Dan Serafini; 23 Ryan Speier | Catchers: 15 Edwin Bellorín; 16 Gerónimo Gil; 20 Chris Iannetta; 8 Yorvit Torrealba; Infielders: 27 Garrett Atkins; 10 Jeff Baker; 21 Clint Barmes; 1 Jamey Carroll; 17 Todd Helton; 47 Joe Koshansky; 47 John Mabry; 7 Kazuo Matsui; 6 Omar Quintanilla; 24 Ian Stewart; 2 Troy Tulowitzki | Outfielders: 14 Sean Barker; 12 Steve Finley; 11 Brad Hawpe; 5 Matt Holliday; 12 Seth Smith; 19 Ryan Spilborghs; 18 Cory Sullivan; 3 Willy Taveras | Manager: 13 Clint Hurdle; Coaches: 36 Bob Apodaca (pitching); 58 Alan Cockrell (hitting); 4 Mike Gallego (third base); 30 Glenallen Hill (first base); 53 Rick Mathews (bullpen); 9 Jamie Quirk (bench); 59 Mark Strittmatter (bullpen catcher) |

== Game log ==
=== Regular season ===
Legend
| | Rockies win |
| style="background-color:#FFBBBB;" | Rockies loss |
| | Postponement |
| | Clinched playoff spot |
| **Bold** | Rockies team member |

2007 regular season game log: 90–73 (.552) (Home: 51–31; Away: 39–42)
April: 10–16 (.385) (Home: 6–7, Road: 4–9)

| # | Date | Time (MT) | Opponent | Score | Win | Loss | Save | Time of Game | Attendance | Record | Box/ Streak |
|---|---|---|---|---|---|---|---|---|---|---|---|
| 1 | April 2 | 2:05 p.m. MDT | Diamondbacks | 6–8 | Cruz (1–0) | **Hawkins** (0–1) | Valverde (1) | 3:18 | 48,169 | 0–1 | L1 |
| 2 | April 3 | 6:35 p.m. MDT | Diamondbacks | 4–3 (11) | **Kim** (1–0) | Valverde (0–1) | — | 3:15 | 20,547 | 1–1 | W1 |
| 3 | April 4 | 1:06 p.m. MDT | Diamondbacks | 11–4 | **López** (1–0) | Davis (0–1) | — | 3:00 | 19,352 | 2–1 | W2 |
| 4 | April 6 | | @ Padres | 4–3 | **Hirsh** (1–0) | Maddux (0–1) | **Fuentes** (1) | | 44,267 | 3–1 | |
| 5 | April 7 | | @ Padres | 3–2 | Hoffman (1–0) | **Corpas** (0–1) | | | 40,504 | 3–2 | |
| 6 | April 8 | | @ Padres | 2–1 (10) | Linebrink (1–0) | **Hawkins** (0–2) | | | 27,086 | 3–3 | |
| 7 | April 9 | | @ Dodgers | 6–3 | **Francis** (1–0) | Schmidt (1–1) | | | 56,000 | 4–3 | |
| 8 | April 10 | | @ Dodgers | 2–1 | Beimel (1–0) | **Kim** (1–1) | Saito (4) | | 40,560 | 4–4 | |
| 9 | April 11 | | @ Dodgers | 3–0 | Penny (2–0) | **Hirsh** (1–1) | Saito (5) | | 35,852 | 4–5 | |
| 10 | April 13 | 6:41 p.m. MDT | @ Diamondbacks | 6–3 | **Affeldt** (1–0) | Webb (1–1) | **Fuentes** (2) | 2:36 | 20,219 | 5–5 | W1 |
| 11 | April 14 | 6:41 p.m. MDT | @ Diamondbacks | 4–5 | Lyon (2–0) | **Hawkins** (0–3) | Valverde (5) | 3:00 | 27,721 | 5–6 | L1 |
| 12 | April 15 | 1:41 p.m. MDT | @ Diamondbacks | 4–6 | Davis (1–1) | **Kim** (1–2) | Valverde (6) | 3:07 | 21,904 | 5–7 | L2 |
| 13 | April 16 | | Giants | 8–0 | Zito (1–2) | **Francis** (1–1) | | | 18,222 | 5–8 | |
| 14 | April 17 | | Giants | 5–3 | **Ramírez** (1–0) | Correia (0–1) | **Fuentes** (3) | | 18,207 | 6–8 | |
| 15 | April 18 | | Dodgers | 7–2 | **Buchholz** (1–0) | Lowe (2–2) | | | 20,366 | 7–8 | |
| 16 | April 19 | | Dodgers | 8–1 | Hendrickson (1–0) | **Cook** (0–1) | | | 19,135 | 7–9 | |
| 17 | April 20 | | Padres | 11–1 | Young (2–1) | **Fogg** (0–1) | | | 22,338 | 7–10 | |
| 18 | April 21 | | Padres | 7–3 | Hensley (1–3) | **Francis** (1–2) | | | 22,795 | 7–11 | |
| 19 | April 22 | | Padres | 4–2 | **Hirsh** (2–1) | Maddux (1–2) | **Fuentes** (4) | | 25,746 | 8–11 | |
| 20 | April 23 | | @ Mets | 6–1 | Maine (3–0) | **Buchholz** (1–1) | | | 32,154 | 8–12 | |
| 21 | April 24 | | @ Mets | 2–1 (12) | Smith (1–0) | **Speier** (0–1) | | | 38,500 | 8–13 | |
| 22 | April 25 | | @ Mets | 11–5 | **Fogg** (1–1) | Pelfrey (0–2) | | | 33,522 | 9–13 | |
| 23 | April 27 | | Braves | 9–7 | James (3–2) | **Francis** (1–3) | Moylan (1) | | 25,079 | 9–14 | |
| 24 | April 28 | | Braves | 6–2 | Smoltz (3–1) | **Hirsh** (2–2) | | | 28,178 | 9–15 | |
| 25 | April 29 | | Braves | 9–7 (11) | **Bautista** (1–0) | Colyer (0–1) | | | 31,445 | 10–15 | |
| 26 | April 30 | | @ Giants | 9–5 | Lowry (3–2) | **Fogg** (1–2) | | | 34,569 | 10–16 | |

May: 15–13 (.536) (Home: 6–8, Road: 9–5)

| # | Date | Time (MT) | Opponent | Score | Win | Loss | Save | Time of Game | Attendance | Record | Box/ Streak |
|---|---|---|---|---|---|---|---|---|---|---|---|
| 27 | May 1 | | @ Giants | 9–7 | **Árias** (1–0) | Ortiz (2–2) | **Fuentes** (5) | | 33,210 | 11–16 | |
| 28 | May 2 | | @ Giants | 5–3 | Hennessey (1–1) | **Francis** (1–4) | | | 32,557 | 11–17 | |
| 29 | May 4 | | @ Reds | 6–5 (11) | **Bautista** (2–0) | Stanton (1–2) | **Fuentes** (6) | | 23,920 | 12–17 | |
| 30 | May 5 | | @ Reds | 9–7 | **Cook** (1–1) | Harang (4–1) | **Fuentes** (7) | | 26,663 | 13–17 | |
| 31 | May 6 | | @ Reds | 9–3 | Arroyo (2–2) | **Fogg** (1–3) | Weathers (6) | | 27,915 | 13–18 | |
| 32 | May 7 | | @ Cardinals | 3–2 | **McClellan** (1–0) | Falkenborg (0–1) | **Fuentes** (8) | | 42,285 | 14–18 | |
| 33 | May 8 | | @ Cardinals | 4–1 | Jiménez (1–0) | **Bautista** (2–1) | Isringhausen (9) | | 42,763 | 14–19 | |
| 34 | May 9 | | @ Cardinals | 9–2 | Wainwright (3–2) | **Hirsh** (2–3) | | | 43,001 | 14–20 | |
| 35 | May 10 | | Giants | 5–3 | **Cook** (2–1) | Lowry (4–3) | **Fuentes** (9) | | 20,120 | 15–20 | |
| 36 | May 11 | | Giants | 8–3 | Lincecum (1–0) | **Fogg** (1–4) | | | 26,162 | 15–21 | |
| 37 | May 12 | | Giants | 6–2 | **Francis** (2–4) | Zito (3–4) | | | 33,569 | 16–21 | |
| 38 | May 13 | | Giants | 15–2 | Cain (2–3) | **Buchholz** (1–2) | | | 24,243 | 16–22 | |
| 39 | May 15 | 6:37 p.m. MDT | Diamondbacks | 0–3 | Johnson (1–2) | **Hirsh** (2–4) | Valverde (13) | 2:22 | 20,178 | 16–23 | L2 |
| 40 | May 16 | 6:35 p.m. MDT | Diamondbacks | 5–3 | **Cook** (3–1) | Webb (3–3) | **Fuentes** (10) | 2:25 | 20,023 | 17–23 | W1 |
| 41 | May 17 | 1:05 p.m. MDT | Diamondbacks | 1–3 | Hernández (4–2) | **Fogg** (1–5) | Valverde (14) | 2:35 | 23,610 | 17–24 | L1 |
| 42 | May 18 | | Royals | 5–2 | Duckworth (1–3) | **Corpas** (0–2) | Soria (9) | | 22,399 | 17–25 | |
| 43 | May 19 | | Royals | 6–4 | **Buchholz** (2–2) | Meche (3–2) | **Fuentes** (11) | | 24,017 | 18–25 | |
| 44 | May 20 | | Royals | 10–5 (12) | Peralta (1–2) | **Ramírez** (1–1) | | | 25,829 | 18–26 | |
| 45 | May 21 | 6:40 p.m. MDT | @ Diamondbacks | 5–6 | Slaten (2–0) | **Affeldt** (1–1) | Valverde (17) | 2:33 | 19,782 | 18–27 | L2 |
| 46 | May 22 | 6:41 p.m. MDT | @ Diamondbacks | 3–1 | **Corpas** (1–2) | Lyon (3–2) | **Fuentes** (11) | 2:44 | 23,058 | 19–27 | W1 |
| 47 | May 23 | 6:40 p.m. MDT | @ Diamondbacks | 2–0 | **Francis** (3–4) | Davis (2–6) | **Fuentes** (13) | 2:43 | 18,373 | 20–27 | W2 |
| 48 | May 25 | | @ Giants | 5–3 | **Affeldt** (2–1) | Benítez (0–2) | **Fuentes** (14) | | 41,274 | 21–27 | |
| 49 | May 26 | | @ Giants | 6–1 | **Cook** (4–1) | Morris (5–2) | | | 38,212 | 22–27 | |
| 50 | May 27 | | @ Giants | 6–4 (10) | **Ramírez** (2–1) | Kline (0–1) | **Fuentes** (15) | | 41,708 | 23–27 | |
| 51 | May 28 | | Cardinals | 6–2 | **Francis** (4–4) | Wells (2–9) | | | 31,575 | 24–27 | |
| 52 | May 29 | | Cardinals | 8–3 | **López** (2–0) | Looper (6–4) | | | 18,213 | 25–27 | |
| 53 | May 30 | | Cardinals | 8–4 | Wellemeyer (1–0) | **Hirsh** (2–5) | | | 19,062 | 25–28 | |
| 54 | May 31 | | Cardinals | 7–3 | Thompson (4–1) | **Cook** (4–2) | | | 19,097 | 25–29 | |

June: 14–13 (.519) (Home: 9–3, Road: 5–10)

| # | Date | Time (MT) | Opponent | Score | Win | Loss | Save | Time of Game | Attendance | Record | Box/ Streak |
|---|---|---|---|---|---|---|---|---|---|---|---|
| 55 | June 1 | | Reds | 4–2 | Livingston (1–0) | **Buchholz** (2–3) | Weathers (12) | | 22,265 | 25–30 | |
| 56 | June 2 | | Reds | 4–1 | **Francis** (5–4) | Lohse (2–7) | **Fuentes** (16) | | 30,076 | 26–30 | |
| 57 | June 3 | | Reds | 10–9 (10) | **Corpas** (2–2) | Santos (1–1) | | | 26,071 | 27–30 | |
| 58 | June 5 | | Astros | 4–1 | Rodríguez (3–5) | **Hirsh** (2–6) | Wheeler (10) | | 27,101 | 27–31 | |
| 59 | June 6 | | Astros | 8–7 | **Buchholz** (3–3) | Williams (2–8) | **Fuentes** (17) | | 22,471 | 28–31 | |
| 60 | June 7 | | Astros | 7–6 | **Affeldt** (3–1) | Wheeler (0–3) | | | 22,103 | 29–31 | |
| 61 | June 8 | | @ Orioles | 4–2 | Trachsel (5–4) | **Francis** (5–5) | Ray (13) | | 22,375 | 29–32 | |
| 62 | June 9 | | @ Orioles | 3–2 (10) | **Affeldt** (4–1) | Williams (0–1) | **Fuentes** (18) | | 27,320 | 30–32 | |
| 63 | June 10 | | @ Orioles | 6–1 | **Hirsh** (3–6) | Bédard (4–4) | | | 34,784 | 31–32 | |
| 64 | June 12 | 5:05 p.m. MDT | @ Red Sox | 1–2 | Wakefield (6–7) | **Cook** (4–3) | Papelbon (15) | 2:25 | 37,008 | 31–33 | L1 |
| 65 | June 13 | 5:07 p.m. MDT | @ Red Sox | 12–2 | **Fogg** (2–5) | Schilling (6–3) | — | 3:09 | 36,808 | 32–33 | W1 |
| 66 | June 14 | 5:07 p.m. MDT | @ Red Sox | 7–1 | **Francis** (6–5) | Beckett (9–1) | — | 3:14 | 36,936 | 33–33 | W2 |
| 67 | June 15 | | Devil Rays | 12–2 | **López** (3–0) | Shields (6–1) | | | 25,762 | 34–33 | |
| 68 | June 16 | | Devil Rays | 10–5 | **Buchholz** (4–3) | Sonnanstine (1–1) | | | 30,101 | 35–33 | |
| 69 | June 17 | | Devil Rays | 7–4 | Kazmir (5–3) | **Cook** (4–4) | Reyes (16) | | 31,190 | 35–34 | |
| 70 | June 19 | 7:05 p.m. MDT | Yankees | 3–1 | **Fogg** (3–5) | Mussina (3–4) | **Fuentes** (19) | 2:54 | 48,077 | 36–34 | W1 |
| 71 | June 20 | 7:06 p.m. MDT | Yankees | 6–1 | **Francis** (7–5) | Pettitte (4–5) | — | 2:32 | 48,440 | 37–34 | W2 |
| 72 | June 21 | 1:05 p.m. MDT | Yankees | 4–3 | **López** (4–0) | Clemens (1–2) | **Fuentes** (20) | 3:08 | 48,611 | 38–34 | W3 |
| 73 | June 22 | | @ Blue Jays | 9–8 (10) | Wolfe (1–0) | **Fuentes** (0–1) | | | 27,369 | 38–35 | |
| 74 | June 23 | | @ Blue Jays | 11–6 | Wolfe (2–0) | **Cook** (4–5) | | | 32,482 | 38–36 | |
| 75 | June 24 | | @ Blue Jays | 5–0 | McGowan (4–3) | **Fogg** (3–6) | | | 33,910 | 38–37 | |
| 76 | June 25 | | @ Cubs | 10–9 | Howry (4–4) | **Fuentes** (0–2) | | | 40,269 | 38–38 | |
| 77 | June 26 | | @ Cubs | 8–5 | Lilly (6–4) | **López** (4–1) | Ohman (1) | | 40,121 | 38–39 | |
| 78 | June 27 | | @ Cubs | 6–4 | Zambrano (9–6) | **Hirsh** (3–7) | Mármol (1) | | 39,972 | 38–40 | |
| 79 | June 28 | | @ Astros | 8–5 (11) | Moehler (1–2) | **Fuentes** (0–3) | | | 42,537 | 38–41 | |
| 80 | June 29 | | @ Astros | 9–8 | Borkowski (2–3) | **Fuentes** (0–4) | | | 42,861 | 38–42 | |
| 81 | June 30 | | @ Astros | 5–0 | **Francis** (8–5) | Jennings (1–3) | | | 43,071 | 39–42 | |

July: 15–9 (.625) (Home: 9–3, Road: 6–6)

| # | Date | Time (MT) | Opponent | Score | Win | Loss | Save | Time of Game | Attendance | Record | Box/ Streak |
|---|---|---|---|---|---|---|---|---|---|---|---|
| 82 | July 1 | | @ Astros | 12–0 | Rodríguez (4–7) | **López** (4–2) | | | 35,260 | 39–43 | |
| 83 | July 2 | | Mets | 6–2 | **Hirsh** (4–7) | Glavine (7–6) | | | 27,252 | 40–43 | |
| 84 | July 3 | | Mets | 11–3 | **Cook** (5–5) | Vargas (0–1) | | | 48,040 | 41–43 | |
| 85 | July 4 | | Mets | 17–7 | **Fogg** (4–6) | Hernández (4–4) | | | 48,123 | 42–43 | |
| 86 | July 6 | 7:06 p.m. MDT | Phillies | 7–6 (11) | **Corpas** (3–2) | Durbin (0–2) | — | 4:09 | 29,239 | 43–43 | W4 |
| 87 | July 7 | 6:07 p.m. MDT | Phillies | 6–3 | **López** (5–2) | Moyer (7–7) | **Corpas** (1) | 2:46 | 35,196 | 44–43 | W5 |
| 88 | July 8 | 1:06 p.m. MDT | Phillies | 4–8 | Eaton (8–5) | **Cook** (5–6) | Madson (1) | 2:55 | 25,119 | 44–44 | L1 |
| — | July 10 | | **78th All-Star Game in San Francisco, CA** | | | | | | | | |
| 89 | July 13 | | @ Brewers | 10–6 | **Francis** (9–5) | Villanueva (6–1) | | | 37,690 | 45–44 | |
| 90 | July 14 | | @ Brewers | 2–1 (10) | Turnbow (2–3) | **Hawkins** (0–4) | | | 42,559 | 45–45 | |
| 91 | July 15 | | @ Brewers | 4–3 | Wise (3–1) | **Affeldt** (4–2) | Cordero (28) | | 42,754 | 45–46 | |
| 92 | July 16 | | @ Pirates | 10–8 | **Hawkins** (1–4) | Van Benschoten (0–4) | **Corpas** (2) | | 16,423 | 46–46 | |
| 93 | July 17 | | @ Pirates | 6–2 | **Fogg** (5–6) | Youman (2–1) | | | 21,604 | 47–46 | |
| 94 | July 18 | | @ Pirates | 5–3 | **Francis** (10–5) | Snell (7–7) | **Corpas** (3) | | 19,285 | 48–46 | |
| 95 | July 19 | | @ Nationals | 5–4 (10) | Rauch (4–2) | **Hawkins** (1–5) | | | 20,573 | 48–47 | |
| 96 | July 20 | | @ Nationals | 3–1 | **Cook** (6–6) | Traber (2–1) | **Corpas** (4) | | 27,581 | 49–47 | |
| 97 | July 21 | | @ Nationals | 3–0 | Bacsik (3–6) | **López** (5–3) | Cordero (18) | | 31,674 | 49–48 | |
| 98 | July 22 | | @ Nationals | 3–0 | Rauch (5–2) | **Julio** (0–3) | Cordero (19) | | 21,793 | 49–49 | |
| 99 | July 23 | | Padres | 7–5 | **Buchholz** (5–3) | Linebrink (3–3) | **Corpas** (5) | | 31,047 | 50–49 | |
| 100 | July 24 | | Padres | 5–3 | Bell (4–2) | **Ramírez** (2–2) | Hoffman (28) | | 37,127 | 50–50 | |
| 101 | July 25 | | Padres | 10–2 | **Cook** (7–6) | Germano (6–5) | | | 28,162 | 51–50 | |
| 102 | July 26 | | Dodgers | 5–4 | Penny (13–1) | **López** (5–4) | Saito (26) | | 49,124 | 51–51 | |
| -- | July 27 | | Dodgers | Postponed (rain) Rescheduled for September 18 | | | | | | 51–51 | |
| 103 | July 28 | | Dodgers | 6–2 | **Francis** (11–5) | Tomko (2–8) | | | 46,039 | 52–51 | |
| 104 | July 29 | | Dodgers | 9–6 | **Jiménez** (1–0) | Billingsley (7–1) | **Corpas** (6) | | 38,167 | 53–51 | |
| 105 | July 31 | | @ Marlins | 6–3 | **Cook** (8–6) | Olsen (8–9) | **Corpas** (7) | | 11,534 | 54–51 | |

August: 15–14 (.517) (Home: 9–5, Road: 6–9)

| # | Date | Time (MT) | Opponent | Score | Win | Loss | Save | Time of Game | Attendance | Record | Box/ Streak |
|---|---|---|---|---|---|---|---|---|---|---|---|
| 106 | August 1 | | @ Marlins | 4–3 | Kim (6–5) | **Fogg** (5–7) | Gregg (22) | | 11,556 | 54–52 | |
| 107 | August 2 | | @ Marlins | 4–3 | **Hawkins** (2–5) | Benítez (2–7) | **Corpas** (8) | | 11,927 | 55–52 | |
| 108 | August 3 | | @ Braves | 9–2 | **Francis** (12–5) | Smoltz (10–6) | | | 37,481 | 56–52 | |
| 109 | August 4 | | @ Braves | 6–4 | Hudson (12–5) | **Jiménez** (1–1) | Wickman (18) | | 50,647 | 56–53 | |
| 110 | August 5 | | @ Braves | 6–5 (10) | Villarreal (2–1) | **Buchholz** (5–4) | | | 37,089 | 56–54 | |
| 111 | August 6 | | Brewers | 6–2 | **Fogg** (6–7) | Vargas (9–4) | | | 29,555 | 57–54 | |
| 112 | August 7 | | Brewers | 11–4 | **Hirsh** (5–7) | Capuano (5–9) | | | 30,280 | 58–54 | |
| 113 | August 8 | | Brewers | 19–4 | **Francis** (13–5) | Gallardo (4–2) | | | 26,613 | 59–54 | |
| 114 | August 9 | | Cubs | 10–2 | Lilly (13–5) | **Jiménez** (1–2) | | | 40,738 | 59–55 | |
| 115 | August 10 | | Cubs | 6–2 | Marquis (9–7) | **Cook** (8–7) | | | 41,282 | 59–56 | |
| 116 | August 11 | | Cubs | 15–2 | **Fogg** (7–7) | Hill (6–7) | | | 48,095 | 60–56 | |
| 117 | August 12 | | Cubs | 6–3 | **Herges** (1–0) | Wood (0–1) | **Corpas** (9) | | 39,176 | 61–56 | |
| 118 | August 14 | | @ Padres | 8–0 | Maddux (8–9) | **Francis** (13–6) | | | 32,049 | 61–57 | |
| 119 | August 15 | | @ Padres | 3–0 | **Jiménez** (2–2) | Meredith (4–6) | **Corpas** (10) | | 36,864 | 62–57 | |
| 120 | August 16 | | @ Padres | 11–9 | Hensley (2–3) | **Affeldt** (4–3) | Hoffman (30) | | 28,198 | 62–58 | |
| 121 | August 17 | | @ Dodgers | 6–4 | Stults (1–1) | **Fogg** (7–8) | Saito (32) | | 48,072 | 62–59 | |
| 122 | August 18 | | @ Dodgers | 7–4 (14) | **Herges** (2–0) | Hernández (3–3) | **Corpas** (11) | | 52,508 | 63–59 | |
| 123 | August 19 | | @ Dodgers | 4–3 | Proctor (4–5) | **Julio** (0–4) | Saito (33) | | 48,732 | 63–60 | |
| 124 | August 20 | | Pirates | 4–2 | Marte (2–0) | **Fuentes** (0–5) | Capps (12) | | 22,682 | 63–61 | |
| 125 | August 21 | | Pirates | 9–2 | **Buchholz** (6–4) | Armas (2–4) | | | 21,136 | 64–61 | |
| 126 | August 22 | | Pirates | 11–2 | Gorzelanny (12–7) | **Fogg** (7–9) | | | 20,629 | 64–62 | |
| 127 | August 23 | | Pirates | 5–1 | Maholm (10–14) | **Morales** (0–1) | | | 20,380 | 64–63 | |
| 128 | August 24 | | Nationals | 6–5 | **Fuentes** (1–5) | Cordero (2–3) | | | 25,232 | 65–63 | |
| 129 | August 25 | | Nationals | 5–1 | **Jiménez** (3–2) | Redding (3–4) | | | 27,179 | 66–63 | |
| 130 | August 26 | | Nationals | 10–5 | **Dessens** (2–1) | Hanrahan (3–2) | | | 24,086 | 67–63 | |
| 131 | August 27 | | @ Giants | 4–1 | Wilson (1–0) | **Julio** (0–5) | Hennessey (15) | | 35,726 | 67–64 | |
| 132 | August 28 | | @ Giants | 3–1 | Cain (7–13) | **Morales** (0–2) | Hennessey (16) | | 37,844 | 67–65 | |
| 133 | August 29 | | @ Giants | 8–0 | **Francis** (14–6) | Lowry (14–8) | | | 38,397 | 68–65 | |
| 134 | August 31 | 6:41 p.m. MDT | @ Diamondbacks | 7–3 | **Herges** (3–0) | Peña (5–3) | — | 3:19 | 26,127 | 69–65 | W2 |

September: 20–8 (.714) (Home: 11–5, Road: 9–3)

| # | Date | Time (MT) | Opponent | Score | Win | Loss | Save | Time of Game | Attendance | Record | Box/ Streak |
|---|---|---|---|---|---|---|---|---|---|---|---|
| 135 | September 1 | 6:42 p.m. MDT | @ Diamondbacks | 7–13 | González (7–2) | **Dessens** (2–2) | — | 3:34 | 29,119 | 69–66 | L1 |
| 136 | September 2 | 1:42 p.m. MDT | @ Diamondbacks | 4–3 | **Fogg** (8–9) | Webb (14–10) | **Corpas** (12) | 2:47 | 26,776 | 70–66 | W1 |
| 137 | September 3 | | Giants | 7–4 | **Francis** (15–6) | Cain (7–14) | **Corpas** (13) | | 30,168 | 71–66 | |
| 138 | September 4 | | Giants | 6–5 | **Corpas** (4–2) | Hennessey (2–4) | | | 20,553 | 72–66 | |
| 139 | September 5 | | Giants | 5–3 | Correia (4–6) | **Jiménez** (3–3) | Hennessey (18) | | 22,157 | 72–67 | |
| 140 | September 7 | | Padres | 10–4 | **Herges** (4–0) | Germano (7–9) | | | 27,247 | 73–67 | |
| 141 | September 8 | | Padres | 3–1 | Maddux (12–9) | **Francis** (15–7) | Hoffman (37) | | 30,429 | 73–68 | |
| 142 | September 9 | | Padres | 4–2 | **Fogg** (9–9) | Young (9–7) | **Corpas** (14) | | 20,260 | 74–68 | |
| 143 | September 10 | 5:06 p.m. MDT | @ Phillies | 5–6 (10) | Myers (4–6) | **Buchholz** (6–5) | — | 3:27 | 25,046 | 74–69 | L1 |
| 144 | September 11 | 5:06 p.m. MDT | @ Phillies | 8–2 | **Morales** (1–2) | Eaton (9–9) | — | 3:13 | 25,263 | 75–69 | W1 |
| 145 | September 12 | 5:06 p.m. MDT | @ Phillies | 12–0 | **Redman** (1–4) | Kendrick (8–4) | — | 2:58 | 31,541 | 76–69 | W2 |
| 146 | September 13 | 5:06 p.m. MDT | @ Phillies | 4–12 | Geary (2–2) | **Francis** (15–8) | — | 3:35 | 42,623 | 76–70 | L1 |
| 147 | September 14 | | Marlins | 7–6 | Willis (9–15) | **Herges** (4–1) | Gregg (30) | | 22,400 | 76–71 | |
| 148 | September 15 | | Marlins | 10–2 | Kensing (1–0) | **Jiménez** (3–4) | | | 26,079 | 76–72 | |
| 149 | September 16 | | Marlins | 13–0 | **Morales** (2–2) | Olsen (9–14) | | | 19,161 | 77–72 | |
| 150 | September 18 | | Dodgers | 3–1 | **Francis** (16–8) | Billingsley (11–5) | **Corpas** (15) | | 23,282 | 78–72 | |
| 151 | September 18 | | Dodgers | 9–8 | **Speier** (1–1) | Saito (1–1) | | | 23,271 | 79–72 | |
| 152 | September 19 | | Dodgers | 6–5 | **Fuentes** (2–5) | Broxton (4–4) | **Corpas** (16) | | 26,184 | 80–72 | |
| 153 | September 20 | | Dodgers | 9–4 | **Jiménez** (4–4) | Lowe (12–13) | | | 23,147 | 81–72 | |
| 154 | September 21 | | @ Padres | 2–1 (14) | **Herges** (5–1) | Thatcher (0–1) | | | 31,288 | 82–72 | |
| 155 | September 22 | | @ Padres | 6–2 | **Speier** (2–1) | Cassel (1–1) | | | 35,020 | 83–72 | |
| 156 | September 23 | | @ Padres | 7–3 | **Francis** (17–8) | Maddux (13–11) | | | 37,984 | 84–72 | |
| 157 | September 25 | | @ Dodgers | 9–7 | **Speier** (3–1) | Hendrickson (4–8) | **Corpas** (17) | | 44,660 | 85–72 | |
| 158 | September 26 | | @ Dodgers | 2–0 | **Fogg** (10–9) | Lowe (12–14) | **Corpas** (18) | | 45,036 | 86–72 | |
| 159 | September 27 | | @ Dodgers | 10–4 | **Morales** (3–2) | Loaiza (2–4) | | | 51,999 | 87–72 | |
| 160 | September 28 | 6:07 p.m. MDT | Diamondbacks | 2–4 | Webb (18–10) | **Francis** (17–9) | Valverde (47) | 2:45 | 48,190 | 87–73 | L1 |
| 161 | September 29 | 6:07 p.m. MDT | Diamondbacks | 11–1 | **Redman** (2–4) | González (8–4) | — | 3:13 | 47,368 | 88–73 | W1 |
| 162 | September 30 | 1:09 p.m. MDT | Diamondbacks | 4–3 | **Fuentes** (3–5) | Nippert (1–1) | **Corpas** (19) | 2:55 | 46,375 | 89–73 | W2 |

October: 1–0 (1.000) (Home: 1–0, Road: 0–0)

| # | Date | Time (MT) | Opponent | Score | Win | Loss | Save | Time of Game | Attendance | Record | Box/ Streak |
|---|---|---|---|---|---|---|---|---|---|---|---|
| 163 | October 1 | | Padres | 9–8 (13) | **Ortiz** (5–4) | Hoffman (4–5) | | | 48,404 | 90–73 | |

=== Detailed records ===
National League
| Opponent | Home | Away | Total | Pct. | Runs scored | Runs allowed |
NL East
| Philadelphia Phillies | 2–1 | 2–2 | 4–3 | 0.571 | 46 | 37 |
| Div Total | 2–1 | 2–2 | 4–3 | 0.571 | 46 | 37 |
NL Central
| Chicago Cubs | 2–2 | 0–3 | 2–5 | 0.286 | 43 | 45 |
| Div Total | 2–2 | 0–3 | 2–5 | 0.286 | 43 | 45 |
NL West
| Arizona Diamondbacks | 5–4 | 5–4 | 10–8 | 0.556 | 86 | 72 |
| **Colorado Rockies** | — | — | — | — | — | — |
| Div Total | 5–4 | 5–4 | 10–8 | 0.556 | 86 | 72 |
| League Total | 9–7 | 7–9 | 16–16 | 0.500 | 175 | 154 |

American League
| Opponent | Home | Away | Total | Pct. | Runs scored | Runs allowed |
AL East
| Boston Red Sox | 0–0 | 2–1 | 2–1 | 0.667 | 20 | 5 |
| New York Yankees | 3–0 | 0–0 | 3–0 | 1.000 | 13 | 5 |
| Div Total | 3–0 | 2–1 | 5–1 | 0.833 | 33 | 10 |
AL Central
Div Total
| League Total | 3–0 | 2–1 | 5–1 | 0.833 | 33 | 10 |
| Season Total | 51–31 | 39–42 | 90–73 | 0.552 | 860 | 758 |

=== Month-by-Month ===
| Month | Games | Won | Lost | Win % | RS | RA |
April
May
June
July
August
September
October
Total

| | Games | Won | Lost | Win % | RS | RA |
| Home | | | | | | |
| Road | | | | | | |
Total

=== Composite Box ===
2007 Colorado Rockies Inning–by–Inning Boxscore
| Team | 1 | 2 | 3 | 4 | 5 | 6 | 7 | 8 | 9 | 10 | 11 | 12 | 13 | 14 | R | H | E |
Opponents
Rockies

=== Postseason game log ===
Legend
| | Rockies win |
| | Rockies loss |
| **Bold** | Rockies team member |

2007 Postseason game log: 7–4 (.636) (Home: 3–2; Away: 4–2)
NL Division Series: vs. Philadelphia Phillies 3–0 (1.000) (Home: 2–0; Away: 1–0)

| # | Date | Time (MT) | Opponent | Score | Win | Loss | Save | Time of Game | Attendance | Series | Box/ Streak |
|---|---|---|---|---|---|---|---|---|---|---|---|
| 1 | October 3 | 1:07 p.m. MDT | @ Phillies | 4–2 | **Francis** (1–0) | Hamels (0–1) | **Corpas** (1) | 2:52 | 45,655 | 1–0 | W1 |
| 2 | October 4 | 1:08 p.m. MDT | @ Phillies | 10–5 | **Fogg** (1–0) | Kendrick (0–1) | **Corpas** (2) | 3:32 | 45,991 | 2–0 | W2 |
| 3 | October 6 | 7:39 p.m. MDT | Phillies | 2–1 | **Fuentes** (1–0) | Romero (0–1) | **Corpas** (3) | 2:59 | 50,724 | 3–0 | W3 |

NL Championship Series: vs. Arizona Diamondbacks 4–0 (1.000) (Home: 2–0; Away: 2–0)

| # | Date | Time (MT) | Opponent | Score | Win | Loss | Save | Time of Game | Attendance | Series | Box/ Streak |
|---|---|---|---|---|---|---|---|---|---|---|---|
| 1 | October 11 | 5:37 p.m. MDT | @ Diamondbacks | 5–1 | **Francis** (2–0) | Webb (1–1) | — | 3:12 | 48,142 | 1–0 (4–0) | W1 |
| 2 | October 12 | 7:19 p.m. MDT | @ Diamondbacks | 3–2 (11) | **Corpas** (1–0) | Valverde (0–1) | **Speier** (1) | 4:26 | 48,219 | 2–0 (5–0) | W2 |
| 3 | October 14 | 6:37 p.m. MDT | Diamondbacks | 4–1 | **Fogg** (2–0) | Hernández (1–1) | **Corpas** (4) | 3:04 | 50,137 | 3–0 (6–0) | W3 |
| 4 | October 15 | 8:21 p.m. MDT | Diamondbacks | 6–4 | **Herges** (1–0) | Owings (0–1) | **Corpas** (5) | 3:17 | 50,213 | 4–0 (7–0) | W4 |

World Series: vs. Boston Red Sox 0–4 (.000) (Home: 0–2; Away: 0–2)

| # | Date | Time (MT) | Opponent | Score | Win | Loss | Save | Time of Game | Attendance | Series | Box/ Streak |
|---|---|---|---|---|---|---|---|---|---|---|---|
| 1 | October 24 | 6:37 p.m. MDT | @ Red Sox | 1–13 | Beckett (1–0) | **Francis** (0–1) | — | 3:30 | 36,733 | 0–1 (7–1) | L1 |
| 2 | October 25 | 6:30 p.m. MDT | @ Red Sox | 1–2 | Schilling (1–0) | **Jiménez** (0–1) | Papelbon (1) | 3:39 | 36,730 | 0–2 (7–2) | L2 |
| 3 | October 27 | 6:36 p.m. MDT | Red Sox | 5–10 | Matsuzaka (1–0) | **Fogg** (0–1) | Papelbon (2) | 4:19 | 49,983 | 0–3 (7–3) | L3 |
| 4 | October 28 | 6:30 p.m. MDT | Red Sox | 3–4 | Lester (1–0) | **Cook** (0–1) | Papelbon (3) | 3:35 | 50,041 | 0–4 (7–4) | L4 |

== Starting Lineups ==
=== Regular Season ===
==== Batting Order ====
2007 Regular Season Batting Order game log
April

| # | Date | Opponent | 1st | 2nd | 3rd | 4th | 5th | 6th | 7th | 8th | 9th |
|---|---|---|---|---|---|---|---|---|---|---|---|
| 1 | April 2 | AZ | #3; Taveras (CF) | #7; Matsui (2B) | #27; Atkins (3B) | #17; Helton (1B) | #5; Holliday (LF) | #11; Hawpe (RF) | #2; Tulowitzki (SS) | #20; Iannetta (C) | #28; Cook (SP) |
| 2 | April 3 | AZ | #3; Taveras (CF) | #7; Matsui (2B) | #27; Atkins (3B) | #17; Helton (1B) | #5; Holliday (LF) | #11; Hawpe (RF) | #2; Tulowitzki (SS) | #20; Iannetta (C) | #26; Francis (SP) |
| 3 | April 4 | AZ | #12; Finley (CF) | #1; Carroll (2B) | #27; Atkins (3B) | #17; Helton (1B) | #5; Holliday (LF) | #11; Hawpe (RF) | #2; Tulowitzki (SS) | #8; Torrealba (C) | #31; López (SP) |
| 10 | April 13 | @ AZ | #12; Finley (CF) | #7; Matsui (2B) | #47; Mabry (3B) | #17; Helton (1B) | #5; Holliday (LF) | #11; Hawpe (RF) | #2; Tulowitzki (SS) | #8; Torrealba (C) | #37; Fogg (SP) |
| 11 | April 14 | @ AZ | #3; Taveras (CF) | #7; Matsui (2B) | #27; Atkins (3B) | #17; Helton (1B) | #5; Holliday (LF) | #11; Hawpe (RF) | #2; Tulowitzki (SS) | #20; Iannetta (C) | #28; Cook (SP) |
| 12 | April 15 | @ AZ | #3; Taveras (CF) | #1; Carroll (2B) | #27; Atkins (3B) | #17; Helton (1B) | #5; Holliday (LF) | #10; Baker (RF) | #8; Torrealba (C) | #2; Tulowitzki (SS) | #49; Kim (SP) |

May

| # | Date | Opponent | 1st | 2nd | 3rd | 4th | 5th | 6th | 7th | 8th | 9th |
|---|---|---|---|---|---|---|---|---|---|---|---|
| 39 | May 15 | AZ | #3; Taveras (CF) | #2; Tulowitzki (SS) | #5; Holliday (LF) | #17; Helton (1B) | #27; Atkins (3B) | #10; Baker (RF) | #8; Torrealba (C) | #1; Carroll (2B) | #48; Hirsh (SP) |
| 40 | May 16 | AZ | #3; Taveras (CF) | #2; Tulowitzki (SS) | #5; Holliday (LF) | #17; Helton (1B) | #47; Mabry (3B) | #11; Hawpe (RF) | #20; Iannetta (C) | #6; Quintanilla (2B) | #28; Cook (SP) |
| 41 | May 17 | AZ | #3; Taveras (CF) | #2; Tulowitzki (SS) | #5; Holliday (LF) | #17; Helton (1B) | #27; Atkins (3B) | #11; Hawpe (RF) | #20; Iannetta (C) | #6; Quintanilla (2B) | #37; Fogg (SP) |
| 46 | May 21 | @ AZ | #3; Taveras (CF) | #7; Matsui (2B) | #5; Holliday (LF) | #17; Helton (1B) | #27; Atkins (3B) | #11; Hawpe (RF) | #2; Tulowitzki (SS) | #20; Iannetta (C) | #28; Cook (SP) |
| 47 | May 22 | @ AZ | #3; Taveras (CF) | #7; Matsui (2B) | #5; Holliday (LF) | #17; Helton (1B) | #27; Atkins (3B) | #11; Hawpe (RF) | #2; Tulowitzki (SS) | #20; Iannetta (C) | #37; Fogg (SP) |
| 48 | May 23 | @ AZ | #19; Spilborghs (CF) | #2; Tulowitzki (SS) | #5; Holliday (LF) | #17; Helton (1B) | #27; Atkins (3B) | #10; Baker (RF) | #8; Torrealba (C) | #1; Carroll (2B) | #26; Francis (SP) |

June

| # | Date | Opponent | 1st | 2nd | 3rd | 4th | 5th | 6th | 7th | 8th | 9th |
|---|---|---|---|---|---|---|---|---|---|---|---|
| 64 | June 12 | @ BOS | #3; Taveras (CF) | #7; Matsui (2B) | #5; Holliday (LF) | #17; Helton (1B) | #27; Atkins (3B) | #11; Hawpe (RF) | #19; Spilborghs (DH) | #2; Tulowitzki (SS) | #8; Torrealba (C) |
| 65 | June 13 | @ BOS | #3; Taveras (CF) | #7; Matsui (2B) | #5; Holliday (LF) | #17; Helton (1B) | #27; Atkins (3B) | #11; Hawpe (RF) | #19; Spilborghs (DH) | #8; Torrealba (C) | #2; Tulowitzki (SS) |
| 66 | June 14 | @ BOS | #3; Taveras (DH) | #7; Matsui (2B) | #5; Holliday (LF) | #17; Helton (1B) | #27; Atkins (3B) | #11; Hawpe (RF) | #19; Spilborghs (CF) | #8; Torrealba (C) | #2; Tulowitzki (SS) |
| 70 | June 19 | NYY | #3; Taveras (CF) | #7; Matsui (2B) | #5; Holliday (LF) | #17; Helton (1B) | #27; Atkins (3B) | #11; Hawpe (RF) | #2; Tulowitzki (SS) | #8; Torrealba (C) | #37; Fogg (SP) |
| 71 | June 20 | NYY | #3; Taveras (CF) | #7; Matsui (2B) | #5; Holliday (LF) | #17; Helton (1B) | #27; Atkins (3B) | #11; Hawpe (RF) | #2; Tulowitzki (SS) | #8; Torrealba (C) | #26; Francis (SP) |
| 72 | June 21 | NYY | #3; Taveras (CF) | #7; Matsui (2B) | #5; Holliday (LF) | #17; Helton (1B) | #27; Atkins (3B) | #11; Hawpe (RF) | #2; Tulowitzki (SS) | #8; Torrealba (C) | #31; López (SP) |
| 76 | June 25 | @ CHC | | | | | | | | | |
| 77 | June 26 | @ CHC | | | | | | | | | |
| 78 | June 27 | @ CHC | | | | | | | | | |

July

| # | Date | Opponent | 1st | 2nd | 3rd | 4th | 5th | 6th | 7th | 8th | 9th |
|---|---|---|---|---|---|---|---|---|---|---|---|
| 86 | July 6 | PHI | #3; Taveras (CF) | #7; Matsui (2B) | #5; Holliday (LF) | #17; Helton (1B) | #27; Atkins (3B) | #11; Hawpe (RF) | #2; Tulowitzki (SS) | #8; Torrealba (C) | #26; Francis (SP) |
| 87 | July 7 | PHI | #19; Spilborghs (CF) | #1; Carroll (2B) | #5; Holliday (LF) | #17; Helton (1B) | #27; Atkins (3B) | #2; Tulowitzki (SS) | #11; Hawpe (RF) | #8; Torrealba (C) | #31; López (SP) |
| 88 | July 8 | PHI | #18; Sullivan (CF) | #7; Matsui (2B) | #5; Holliday (LF) | #17; Helton (1B) | #27; Atkins (3B) | #11; Hawpe (RF) | #2; Tulowitzki (SS) | #20; Iannetta (C) | #28; Cook (SP) |

August

| # | Date | Opponent | 1st | 2nd | 3rd | 4th | 5th | 6th | 7th | 8th | 9th |
|---|---|---|---|---|---|---|---|---|---|---|---|
| 114 | August 9 | CHC | | | | | | | | | |
| 115 | August 10 | CHC | | | | | | | | | |
| 116 | August 11 | CHC | | | | | | | | | |
| 117 | August 12 | CHC | | | | | | | | | |
| 134 | August 31 | @ AZ | #7; Matsui (2B) | #2; Tulowitzki (SS) | #5; Holliday (LF) | #17; Helton (1B) | #27; Atkins (3B) | #11; Hawpe (RF) | #19; Spilborghs (CF) | #8; Torrealba (C) | #38; Jiménez (SP) |

September

| # | Date | Opponent | 1st | 2nd | 3rd | 4th | 5th | 6th | 7th | 8th | 9th |
|---|---|---|---|---|---|---|---|---|---|---|---|
| 135 | September 1 | @ AZ | #3; Taveras (CF) | #7; Matsui (2B) | #5; Holliday (LF) | #17; Helton (1B) | #27; Atkins (3B) | #2; Tulowitzki (SS) | #19; Spilborghs (RF) | #20; Iannetta (C) | #39; Dessens (SP) |
| 136 | September 2 | @ AZ | #3; Taveras (CF) | #7; Matsui (2B) | #5; Holliday (LF) | #17; Helton (1B) | #11; Hawpe (RF) | #2; Tulowitzki (SS) | #24; Stewart (3B) | #8; Torrealba (C) | #37; Fogg (SP) |
| 143 | September 10 | @ PHI | #6; Quintanilla (2B) | #2; Tulowitzki (SS) | #5; Holliday (LF) | #17; Helton (1B) | #27; Atkins (3B) | #11; Hawpe (RF) | #19; Spilborghs (CF) | #8; Torrealba (C) | #38; Jiménez (SP) |
| 144 | September 11 | @ PHI | #18; Sullivan (CF) | #2; Tulowitzki (SS) | #5; Holliday (LF) | #17; Helton (1B) | #27; Atkins (3B) | #11; Hawpe (RF) | #8; Torrealba (C) | #1; Carroll (2B) | #56; Morales (SP) |
| 145 | September 12 | @ PHI | #18; Sullivan (CF) | #2; Tulowitzki (SS) | #5; Holliday (LF) | #17; Helton (1B) | #27; Atkins (3B) | #11; Hawpe (RF) | #8; Torrealba (C) | #6; Quintanilla (2B) | #54; Bautista (SP) |
| 146 | September 13 | @ PHI | #18; Sullivan (CF) | #2; Tulowitzki (SS) | #5; Holliday (LF) | #17; Helton (1B) | #27; Atkins (3B) | #11; Hawpe (RF) | #8; Torrealba (C) | #6; Quintanilla (2B) | #26; Francis (SP) |
| 160 | September 28 | AZ | #7; Matsui (2B) | #2; Tulowitzki (SS) | #5; Holliday (LF) | #17; Helton (1B) | #27; Atkins (3B) | #11; Hawpe (RF) | #8; Torrealba (C) | #18; Sullivan (CF) | #26; Francis (SP) |
| 161 | September 29 | AZ | #7; Matsui (2B) | #2; Tulowitzki (SS) | #5; Holliday (LF) | #17; Helton (1B) | #27; Atkins (3B) | #11; Hawpe (RF) | #19; Spilborghs (CF) | #20; Iannetta (C) | #55; Redman (SP) |
| 162 | September 30 | AZ | #7; Matsui (2B) | #2; Tulowitzki (SS) | #5; Holliday (LF) | #17; Helton (1B) | #27; Atkins (3B) | #11; Hawpe (RF) | #19; Spilborghs (CF) | #8; Torrealba (C) | #38; Jiménez (SP) |

October

| # | Date | Opponent | 1st | 2nd | 3rd | 4th | 5th | 6th | 7th | 8th | 9th |

==== Defensive Lineup ====
2007 Regular Season Defensive Lineup game log
April

| # | Date | Opponent | C | 1B | 2B | 3B | SS | LF | CF | RF | P |
|---|---|---|---|---|---|---|---|---|---|---|---|
| 1 | April 2 | AZ | #20; Iannetta | #17; Helton | #7; Matsui | #27; Atkins | #2; Tulowitzki | #5; Holliday | #3; Taveras | #11; Hawpe | #28; Cook |
| 2 | April 3 | AZ | #20; Iannetta | #17; Helton | #7; Matsui | #27; Atkins | #2; Tulowitzki | #5; Holliday | #3; Taveras | #11; Hawpe | #26; Francis |
| 3 | April 4 | AZ | #8; Torrealba | #17; Helton | #1; Carroll | #27; Atkins | #2; Tulowitzki | #5; Holliday | #12; Finley | #11; Hawpe | #31; López |
| 10 | April 13 | @ AZ | #8; Torrealba | #17; Helton | #7; Matsui | #47; Mabry | #2; Tulowitzki | #5; Holliday | #12; Finley | #11; Hawpe | #37; Fogg |
| 11 | April 14 | @ AZ | #20; Iannetta | #17; Helton | #7; Matsui | #27; Atkins | #2; Tulowitzki | #5; Holliday | #3; Taveras | #11; Hawpe | #28; Cook |
| 12 | April 15 | @ AZ | #8; Torrealba | #17; Helton | #1; Carroll | #27; Atkins | #2; Tulowitzki | #5; Holliday | #3; Taveras | #10; Baker | #49; Kim |

May

| # | Date | Opponent | C | 1B | 2B | 3B | SS | LF | CF | RF | P |
|---|---|---|---|---|---|---|---|---|---|---|---|
| 39 | May 15 | AZ | #8; Torrealba | #17; Helton | #1; Carroll | #27; Atkins | #2; Tulowitzki | #5; Holliday | #3; Taveras | #10; Baker | #48; Hirsh |
| 40 | May 16 | AZ | #20; Iannetta | #17; Helton | #6; Quintanilla | #47; Mabry | #2; Tulowitzki | #5; Holliday | #3; Taveras | #11; Hawpe | #28; Cook |
| 41 | May 17 | AZ | #20; Iannetta | #17; Helton | #6; Quintanilla | #27; Atkins | #2; Tulowitzki | #5; Holliday | #3; Taveras | #11; Hawpe | #37; Fogg |
| 46 | May 21 | @ AZ | #20; Iannetta | #17; Helton | #6; Quintanilla | #27; Atkins | #2; Tulowitzki | #5; Holliday | #3; Taveras | #11; Hawpe | #28; Cook |
| 47 | May 22 | @ AZ | #20; Iannetta | #17; Helton | #6; Quintanilla | #27; Atkins | #2; Tulowitzki | #5; Holliday | #3; Taveras | #11; Hawpe | #37; Fogg |
| 48 | May 23 | @ AZ | #8; Torrealba | #17; Helton | #1; Carroll | #27; Atkins | #2; Tulowitzki | #5; Holliday | #19; Spilborghs | #10; Baker | #26; Francis |

June

| # | Date | Opponent | C | 1B | 2B | 3B | SS | LF | CF | RF | P |
|---|---|---|---|---|---|---|---|---|---|---|---|
| 64 | June 12 | @ BOS | #8; Torrealba | #17; Helton | #7; Matsui | #27; Atkins | #2; Tulowitzki | #5; Holliday | #3; Taveras | #11; Hawpe | #28; Cook |
| 65 | June 13 | @ BOS | #8; Torrealba | #17; Helton | #7; Matsui | #27; Atkins | #2; Tulowitzki | #5; Holliday | #3; Taveras | #11; Hawpe | #37; Fogg |
| 66 | June 14 | @ BOS | #8; Torrealba | #17; Helton | #7; Matsui | #27; Atkins | #2; Tulowitzki | #5; Holliday | #19; Spilborghs | #11; Hawpe | #26; Francis |
| 70 | June 19 | NYY | #8; Torrealba | #17; Helton | #7; Matsui | #27; Atkins | #2; Tulowitzki | #5; Holliday | #3; Taveras | #11; Hawpe | #37; Fogg |
| 71 | June 20 | NYY | #8; Torrealba | #17; Helton | #7; Matsui | #27; Atkins | #2; Tulowitzki | #5; Holliday | #3; Taveras | #11; Hawpe | #26; Francis |
| 72 | June 21 | NYY | #8; Torrealba | #17; Helton | #7; Matsui | #27; Atkins | #2; Tulowitzki | #5; Holliday | #3; Taveras | #11; Hawpe | #31; López |
| 76 | June 25 | @ CHC | | | | | | | | | |
| 77 | June 26 | @ CHC | | | | | | | | | |
| 78 | June 27 | @ CHC | | | | | | | | | |

July

| # | Date | Opponent | C | 1B | 2B | 3B | SS | LF | CF | RF | P |
|---|---|---|---|---|---|---|---|---|---|---|---|
| 86 | July 6 | PHI | #8; Torrealba | #17; Helton | #7; Matsui | #27; Atkins | #2; Tulowitzki | #5; Holliday | #3; Taveras | #11; Hawpe | #26; Francis |
| 87 | July 7 | PHI | #8; Torrealba | #17; Helton | #1; Carroll | #27; Atkins | #2; Tulowitzki | #5; Holliday | #19; Spilborghs | #11; Hawpe | #31; López |
| 88 | July 8 | PHI | #20; Iannetta | #17; Helton | #7; Matsui | #27; Atkins | #2; Tulowitzki | #5; Holliday | #18; Sullivan | #11; Hawpe | #28; Cook |

August

| # | Date | Opponent | C | 1B | 2B | 3B | SS | LF | CF | RF | P |
|---|---|---|---|---|---|---|---|---|---|---|---|
| 114 | August 9 | CHC | | | | | | | | | |
| 115 | August 10 | CHC | | | | | | | | | |
| 116 | August 11 | CHC | | | | | | | | | |
| 117 | August 12 | CHC | | | | | | | | | |
| 134 | August 31 | @ AZ | #8; Torrealba | #17; Helton | #7; Matsui | #27; Atkins | #2; Tulowitzki | #5; Holliday | #19; Spilborghs | #11; Hawpe | #38; Jiménez |

September

| # | Date | Opponent | C | 1B | 2B | 3B | SS | LF | CF | RF | P |
|---|---|---|---|---|---|---|---|---|---|---|---|
| 135 | September 1 | @ AZ | #20; Iannetta | #17; Helton | #7; Matsui | #27; Atkins | #2; Tulowitzki | #5; Holliday | #3; Taveras | #19; Spilborghs | #39; Dessens |
| 136 | September 2 | @ AZ | #8; Torrealba | #17; Helton | #7; Matsui | #24; Stewart | #2; Tulowitzki | #5; Holliday | #3; Taveras | #11; Hawpe | #37; Fogg |
| 143 | September 10 | @ PHI | #8; Torrealba | #17; Helton | #6; Quintanilla | #27; Atkins | #2; Tulowitzki | #5; Holliday | #19; Spilborghs | #11; Hawpe | #38; Jiménez |
| 144 | September 11 | @ PHI | #8; Torrealba | #17; Helton | #1; Carroll | #27; Atkins | #2; Tulowitzki | #5; Holliday | #18; Sullivan | #11; Hawpe | #56; Morales |
| 145 | September 12 | @ PHI | #8; Torrealba | #17; Helton | #6; Quintanilla | #27; Atkins | #2; Tulowitzki | #5; Holliday | #18; Sullivan | #11; Hawpe | #54; Bautista |
| 146 | September 13 | @ PHI | #8; Torrealba | #17; Helton | #6; Quintanilla | #27; Atkins | #2; Tulowitzki | #5; Holliday | #18; Sullivan | #11; Hawpe | #26; Francis |
| 160 | September 28 | AZ | #8; Torrealba | #17; Helton | #7; Matsui | #24; Stewart | #2; Tulowitzki | #5; Holliday | #18; Sullivan | #11; Hawpe | #26; Francis |
| 161 | September 29 | AZ | #20; Iannetta | #17; Helton | #7; Matsui | #24; Stewart | #2; Tulowitzki | #5; Holliday | #19; Spilborghs | #11; Hawpe | #55; Redman |
| 162 | September 30 | AZ | #8; Torrealba | #17; Helton | #7; Matsui | #24; Stewart | #2; Tulowitzki | #5; Holliday | #19; Spilborghs | #11; Hawpe | #38; Jiménez |

October

| # | Date | Opponent | C | 1B | 2B | 3B | SS | LF | CF | RF | P |

=== Postseason ===
==== Batting Order ====
2007 Postseason Batting Order game log
NL Division Series: vs. Philadelphia Phillies

| # | Date | Opponent | 1st | 2nd | 3rd | 4th | 5th | 6th | 7th | 8th | 9th |
|---|---|---|---|---|---|---|---|---|---|---|---|
| 1 | October 3 | @ PHI | #7; Matsui (2B) | #2; Tulowitzki (SS) | #5; Holliday (LF) | #17; Helton (1B) | #27; Atkins (3B) | #11; Hawpe (RF) | #19; Spilborghs (CF) | #8; Torrealba (C) | #26; Francis (SP) |
| 2 | October 4 | @ PHI | #7; Matsui (2B) | #2; Tulowitzki (SS) | #5; Holliday (LF) | #17; Helton (1B) | #27; Atkins (3B) | #11; Hawpe (RF) | #19; Spilborghs (CF) | #8; Torrealba (C) | #56; Morales (SP) |
| 3 | October 6 | PHI | #7; Matsui (2B) | #2; Tulowitzki (SS) | #5; Holliday (LF) | #17; Helton (1B) | #27; Atkins (3B) | #11; Hawpe (RF) | #19; Spilborghs (CF) | #8; Torrealba (C) | #38; Jiménez (SP) |

NL Championship Series: vs. Arizona Diamondbacks

| # | Date | Opponent | 1st | 2nd | 3rd | 4th | 5th | 6th | 7th | 8th | 9th |
|---|---|---|---|---|---|---|---|---|---|---|---|
| 1 | October 11 | @ AZ | #3; Taveras (CF) | #7; Matsui (2B) | #5; Holliday (LF) | #17; Helton (1B) | #27; Atkins (3B) | #11; Hawpe (RF) | #2; Tulowitzki (SS) | #8; Torrealba (C) | #26; Francis (SP) |
| 2 | October 12 | @ AZ | #3; Taveras (CF) | #7; Matsui (2B) | #5; Holliday (LF) | #17; Helton (1B) | #27; Atkins (3B) | #2; Tulowitzki (SS) | #11; Hawpe (RF) | #8; Torrealba (C) | #38; Jiménez (SP) |
| 3 | October 14 | AZ | #3; Taveras (CF) | #7; Matsui (2B) | #5; Holliday (LF) | #17; Helton (1B) | #27; Atkins (3B) | #11; Hawpe (RF) | #2; Tulowitzki (SS) | #8; Torrealba (C) | #37; Fogg (SP) |
| 4 | October 15 | AZ | #3; Taveras (CF) | #7; Matsui (2B) | #5; Holliday (LF) | #17; Helton (1B) | #27; Atkins (3B) | #11; Hawpe (RF) | #2; Tulowitzki (SS) | #8; Torrealba (C) | #56; Morales (SP) |

World Series: vs. Boston Red Sox

| # | Date | Opponent | 1st | 2nd | 3rd | 4th | 5th | 6th | 7th | 8th | 9th |
|---|---|---|---|---|---|---|---|---|---|---|---|
| 1 | October 24 | @ BOS | #3; Taveras (CF) | #7; Matsui (2B) | #5; Holliday (LF) | #17; Helton (1B) | #27; Atkins (3B) | #11; Hawpe (RF) | #2; Tulowitzki (SS) | #8; Torrealba (C) | #19; Spilborghs (DH) |
| 2 | October 25 | @ BOS | #3; Taveras (CF) | #7; Matsui (2B) | #5; Holliday (LF) | #17; Helton (1B) | #27; Atkins (3B) | #11; Hawpe (RF) | #2; Tulowitzki (SS) | #8; Torrealba (C) | #19; Spilborghs (DH) |
| 3 | October 27 | BOS | #7; Matsui (2B) | #2; Tulowitzki (SS) | #5; Holliday (LF) | #17; Helton (1B) | #27; Atkins (3B) | #11; Hawpe (RF) | #8; Torrealba (C) | #18; Sullivan (CF) | #37; Fogg (SP) |
| 4 | October 28 | BOS | #7; Matsui (2B) | #2; Tulowitzki (SS) | #5; Holliday (LF) | #17; Helton (1B) | #27; Atkins (3B) | #19; Spilborghs (CF) | #11; Hawpe (RF) | #8; Torrealba (C) | #28; Cook (SP) |

==== Defensive Lineup ====
2007 Postseason Defensive Lineup game log
NL Division Series: vs. Philadelphia Phillies

| # | Date | Opponent | C | 1B | 2B | 3B | SS | LF | CF | RF | P |
|---|---|---|---|---|---|---|---|---|---|---|---|
| 1 | October 3 | @ PHI | #8; Torrealba | #17; Helton | #7; Matsui | #27; Atkins | #2; Tulowitzki | #5; Holliday | #19; Spilborghs | #11; Hawpe | #26; Francis |
| 2 | October 4 | @ PHI | #8; Torrealba | #17; Helton | #7; Matsui | #27; Atkins | #2; Tulowitzki | #5; Holliday | #19; Spilborghs | #11; Hawpe | #56; Morales |
| 3 | October 6 | PHI | #8; Torrealba | #17; Helton | #7; Matsui | #27; Atkins | #2; Tulowitzki | #5; Holliday | #19; Spilborghs | #11; Hawpe | #38; Jiménez |

NL Championship Series: vs. Arizona Diamondbacks

| # | Date | Opponent | C | 1B | 2B | 3B | SS | LF | CF | RF | P |
|---|---|---|---|---|---|---|---|---|---|---|---|
| 1 | October 11 | @ AZ | #8; Torrealba | #17; Helton | #7; Matsui | #27; Atkins | #2; Tulowitzki | #5; Holliday | #3; Taveras | #11; Hawpe | #26; Francis |
| 2 | October 12 | @ AZ | #8; Torrealba | #17; Helton | #7; Matsui | #27; Atkins | #2; Tulowitzki | #5; Holliday | #3; Taveras | #11; Hawpe | #38; Jiménez |
| 3 | October 14 | AZ | #8; Torrealba | #17; Helton | #7; Matsui | #27; Atkins | #2; Tulowitzki | #5; Holliday | #3; Taveras | #11; Hawpe | #37; Fogg |
| 4 | October 15 | AZ | #8; Torrealba | #17; Helton | #7; Matsui | #27; Atkins | #2; Tulowitzki | #5; Holliday | #3; Taveras | #11; Hawpe | #56; Morales |

World Series: vs. Boston Red Sox

| # | Date | Opponent | C | 1B | 2B | 3B | SS | LF | CF | RF | P |
|---|---|---|---|---|---|---|---|---|---|---|---|
| 1 | October 24 | @ BOS | #8; Torrealba | #17; Helton | #7; Matsui | #27; Atkins | #2; Tulowitzki | #5; Holliday | #3; Taveras | #11; Hawpe | #26; Francis |
| 2 | October 25 | @ BOS | #8; Torrealba | #17; Helton | #7; Matsui | #27; Atkins | #2; Tulowitzki | #5; Holliday | #3; Taveras | #11; Hawpe | #38; Jiménez |
| 3 | October 27 | BOS | #8; Torrealba | #17; Helton | #7; Matsui | #27; Atkins | #2; Tulowitzki | #5; Holliday | #18; Sullivan | #11; Hawpe | #37; Fogg |
| 4 | October 28 | BOS | #8; Torrealba | #17; Helton | #7; Matsui | #27; Atkins | #2; Tulowitzki | #5; Holliday | #19; Spilborghs | #11; Hawpe | #28; Cook |

== Game Umpires ==
=== Regular Season ===
2007 Regular Season Umpire game log
April

| # | Date | Opponent | HP | 1B | 2B | 3B |
|---|---|---|---|---|---|---|
| 1 | April 2 | AZ | #36; Tim McClelland (crew chief) | #25; Fieldin Culbreth | #43; Paul Schrieber | #80; Rob Drake |
| 2 | April 3 | AZ | #25; Fieldin Culbreth | #43; Paul Schrieber | #80; Rob Drake | #36; Tim McClelland (crew chief) |
| 3 | April 4 | AZ | #43; Paul Schrieber | #80; Rob Drake | #36; Tim McClelland (crew chief) | #25; Fieldin Culbreth |
| 10 | April 13 | @ AZ | #91; Brian Knight | #15; Ed Hickox | #54; C. B. Bucknor | #22; Joe West (crew chief) |
| 11 | April 14 | @ AZ | #15; Ed Hickox | #54; C. B. Bucknor | #22; Joe West (crew chief) | #91; Brian Knight |
| 12 | April 15 | @ AZ | #54; C. B. Bucknor | #22; Joe West (crew chief) | #91; Brian Knight | #15; Ed Hickox |

May

| # | Date | Opponent | HP | 1B | 2B | 3B |
|---|---|---|---|---|---|---|
| 39 | May 15 | AZ | #23; Rick Reed (crew chief) | #14; Chuck Meriwether | #72; Alfonso Márquez | #25; Tim Timmons |
| 40 | May 16 | AZ | #14; Chuck Meriwether | #72; Alfonso Márquez | #25; Tim Timmons | #23; Rick Reed (crew chief) |
| 41 | May 17 | AZ | #72; Alfonso Márquez | #25; Tim Timmons | #23; Rick Reed (crew chief) | #14; Chuck Meriwether |
| 46 | May 21 | @ AZ | #88; Doug Eddings | #32; Dana DeMuth (crew chief) | #13; Derryl Cousins | #44; Kerwin Danley |
| 47 | May 22 | @ AZ | #32; Dana DeMuth (crew chief) | #13; Derryl Cousins | #44; Kerwin Danley | #88; Doug Eddings |
| 48 | May 23 | @ AZ | #13; Derryl Cousins | #44; Kerwin Danley | #88; Doug Eddings | #32; Dana DeMuth (crew chief) |

June

| # | Date | Opponent | HP | 1B | 2B | 3B |
|---|---|---|---|---|---|---|
| 64 | June 12 | @ BOS | #6; Bruce Froemming (crew chief) | #33; Mike Winters | #92; James Hoye | #47; Mark Wegner |
| 65 | June 13 | @ BOS | #33; Mike Winters | #92; James Hoye | #47; Mark Wegner | #6; Bruce Froemming (crew chief) |
| 66 | June 14 | @ BOS | #92; James Hoye | #47; Mark Wegner | #6; Bruce Froemming (crew chief) | #33; Mike Winters |
| 70 | June 19 | NYY | #47; Lance Barksdale | #3; Tim Welke (crew chief) | #77; Jim Reynolds | #97; Todd Tichenor |
| 71 | June 20 | NYY | #3; Tim Welke (crew chief) | #77; Jim Reynolds | #97; Todd Tichenor | #47; Lance Barksdale |
| 72 | June 21 | NYY | #77; Jim Reynolds | #97; Todd Tichenor | #47; Lance Barksdale | #3; Tim Welke (crew chief) |
| 76 | June 25 | @ CHC | | | | |
| 77 | June 26 | @ CHC | | | | |
| 78 | June 27 | @ CHC | | | | |

July

| # | Date | Opponent | HP | 1B | 2B | 3B |
|---|---|---|---|---|---|---|
| 86 | July 6 | PHI | #63; Laz Diaz | #17; John Hirschbeck (crew chief) | #52; Bill Welke | #84; Angel Campos |
| 87 | July 7 | PHI | #17; John Hirschbeck (crew chief) | #52; Bill Welke | #84; Angel Campos | #63; Laz Diaz |
| 88 | July 8 | PHI | #52; Bill Welke | #84; Angel Campos | #63; Laz Diaz | #17; John Hirschbeck (crew chief) |

August

| # | Date | Opponent | HP | 1B | 2B | 3B |
|---|---|---|---|---|---|---|
| 114 | August 9 | CHC | | | | |
| 115 | August 10 | CHC | | | | |
| 116 | August 11 | CHC | | | | |
| 117 | August 12 | CHC | | | | |
| 134 | August 31 | @ AZ | #11; Ed Montague (crew chief) | #24; Jerry Layne | #26; Bill Miller | #51; Marvin Hudson |

September

| # | Date | Opponent | HP | 1B | 2B | 3B |
|---|---|---|---|---|---|---|
| 135 | September 1 | @ AZ | #24; Jerry Layne | #26; Bill Miller | #51; Marvin Hudson | #11; Ed Montague (crew chief) |
| 136 | September 2 | @ AZ | #26; Bill Miller | #51; Marvin Hudson | #11; Ed Montague (crew chief) | #24; Jerry Layne |
| 143 | September 10 | @ PHI | #36; Wally Bell (crew chief) | #16; Mike DiMuro | #52; Bill Welke | #17; John Hirschbeck |
| 144 | September 11 | @ PHI | #16; Mike DiMuro | #52; Bill Welke | #17; John Hirschbeck | #36; Wally Bell (crew chief) |
| 145 | September 12 | @ PHI | #52; Bill Welke | #17; John Hirschbeck | #36; Wally Bell (crew chief) | #16; Mike DiMuro |
| 146 | September 13 | @ PHI | #17; John Hirschbeck | #36; Wally Bell (crew chief) | #16; Mike DiMuro | #52; Bill Welke |
| 160 | September 28 | AZ | #4; Tim Tschida (crew chief) | #66; Jim Joyce | #45; Jeff Nelson | #28; Jim Wolf |
| 161 | September 29 | AZ | #66; Jim Joyce | #45; Jeff Nelson | #28; Jim Wolf | #4; Tim Tschida (crew chief) |
| 162 | September 30 | AZ | #45; Jeff Nelson | #28; Jim Wolf | #4; Tim Tschida (crew chief) | #66; Jim Joyce |

October

| # | Date | Opponent | HP | 1B | 2B | 3B | LF | RF |

=== Postseason ===
2007 Postseason Umpire game log
NL Division Series: vs. Philadelphia Phillies

| # | Date | Opponent | HP | 1B | 2B | 3B | LF | RF |
|---|---|---|---|---|---|---|---|---|
| 1 | October 3 | @ PHI | #5; Dale Scott (crew chief) | #77; Jim Reynolds | #14; Chuck Meriwether | #8; Jeff Kellogg | #13; Derryl Cousins | #15; Ed Hickox |
| 2 | October 4 | @ PHI | #77; Jim Reynolds | #14; Chuck Meriwether | #8; Jeff Kellogg | #13; Derryl Cousins | #15; Ed Hickox | #5; Dale Scott (crew chief) |
| 3 | October 6 | PHI | #14; Chuck Meriwether | #8; Jeff Kellogg | #13; Derryl Cousins | #15; Ed Hickox | #5; Dale Scott (crew chief) | #77; Jim Reynolds |

NL Championship Series: vs. Arizona Diamondbacks

| # | Date | Opponent | HP | 1B | 2B | 3B | LF | RF |
|---|---|---|---|---|---|---|---|---|
| 1 | October 11 | @ AZ | #36; Tim McClelland (crew chief) | #47; Mark Wegner | #27; Larry Vanover | #20; Tom Hallion | #55; Angel Hernandez | #66; Jim Joyce |
| 2 | October 12 | @ AZ | #47; Mark Wegner | #27; Larry Vanover | #20; Tom Hallion | #55; Angel Hernandez | #66; Jim Joyce | #36; Tim McClelland (crew chief) |
| 3 | October 14 | AZ | #27; Larry Vanover | #20; Tom Hallion | #55; Angel Hernandez | #66; Jim Joyce | #36; Tim McClelland (crew chief) | #47; Mark Wegner |
| 4 | October 15 | AZ | #20; Tom Hallion | #55; Angel Hernandez | #66; Jim Joyce | #36; Tim McClelland (crew chief) | #47; Mark Wegner | #27; Larry Vanover |

World Series: vs. Boston Red Sox

| # | Date | Opponent | HP | 1B | 2B | 3B | LF | RF |
|---|---|---|---|---|---|---|---|---|
| 1 | October 24 | @ BOS | #11; Ed Montague (crew chief) | #63; Laz Diaz | #65; Ted Barrett | #14; Chuck Meriwether | #57; Mike Everitt | #31; Mike Reilly |
| 2 | October 25 | @ BOS | #63; Laz Diaz | #65; Ted Barrett | #14; Chuck Meriwether | #57; Mike Everitt | #31; Mike Reilly | #11; Ed Montague (crew chief) |
| 3 | October 27 | BOS | #65; Ted Barrett | #14; Chuck Meriwether | #57; Mike Everitt | #31; Mike Reilly | #11; Ed Montague (crew chief) | #63; Laz Diaz |
| 4 | October 28 | BOS | #14; Chuck Meriwether | #57; Mike Everitt | #31; Mike Reilly | #11; Ed Montague (crew chief) | #63; Laz Diaz | #65; Ted Barrett |

== Player stats ==
| = Indicates team leader |

=== Batting ===
==== Starters by position ====
Note: Pos = Position; G = Games played; AB = At bats; H = Hits; Avg. = Batting average; HR = Home runs; RBI = Runs batted in

| Pos | Player | G | AB | H | Avg. | HR | RBI |
|---|---|---|---|---|---|---|---|
| C | Yorvit Torrealba | 113 | 396 | 101 | .255 | 8 | 47 |
| 1B | Todd Helton | 154 | 557 | 178 | .320 | 17 | 91 |
| 2B | Kazuo Matsui | 104 | 410 | 118 | .288 | 4 | 37 |
| SS | Troy Tulowitzki | 155 | 609 | 177 | .291 | 24 | 99 |
| 3B | Garrett Atkins | 157 | 605 | 182 | .301 | 25 | 111 |
| LF | Matt Holliday | 158 | 636 | 216 | .340 | 36 | 137 |
| CF | Willy Taveras | 97 | 372 | 119 | .320 | 2 | 24 |
| RF | Brad Hawpe | 152 | 516 | 150 | .291 | 29 | 116 |

==== Other batters ====
Note: G = Games played; AB = At bats; H = Hits; Avg. = Batting average; HR = Home runs; RBI = Runs batted in

| Player | G | AB | H | Avg. | HR | RBI |
|---|---|---|---|---|---|---|
| Ryan Spilborghs | 97 | 264 | 79 | .299 | 11 | 51 |
| Jamey Carroll | 108 | 227 | 51 | .225 | 2 | 22 |
| Chris Iannetta | 67 | 197 | 43 | .218 | 4 | 27 |
| Jeff Baker | 85 | 144 | 32 | .222 | 4 | 12 |
| Cory Sullivan | 72 | 140 | 40 | .286 | 2 | 14 |
| Steve Finley | 43 | 94 | 17 | .181 | 1 | 2 |
| Omar Quintanilla | 27 | 70 | 16 | .229 | 0 | 5 |
| Ian Stewart | 35 | 43 | 9 | .209 | 1 | 9 |
| Clint Barmes | 27 | 37 | 8 | .216 | 0 | 1 |
| John Mabry | 28 | 34 | 4 | .118 | 1 | 5 |
| Gerónimo Gil | 5 | 14 | 1 | .071 | 0 | 0 |
| Joe Koshansky | 17 | 12 | 1 | .083 | 0 | 2 |
| Seth Smith | 7 | 8 | 5 | .625 | 0 | 0 |
| Sean Barker | 3 | 2 | 0 | .000 | 0 | 0 |
| Edwin Bellorín | 3 | 2 | 0 | .000 | 0 | 0 |

=== Pitching ===
==== Starting pitchers ====
Note: G = Games pitched; IP = Innings pitched; W = Wins; L = Losses; ERA = Earned run average; SO = Strikeouts

| Player | G | IP | W | L | ERA | SO |
|---|---|---|---|---|---|---|
| Jeff Francis | 34 | 215.1 | 17 | 9 | 4.22 | 165 |
| Aaron Cook | 25 | 166.0 | 8 | 7 | 4.12 | 61 |
| Josh Fogg | 30 | 165.2 | 10 | 9 | 4.94 | 94 |
| Jason Hirsh | 19 | 112.1 | 5 | 7 | 4.81 | 75 |
| Ubaldo Jiménez | 15 | 82.0 | 4 | 4 | 4.28 | 68 |
| Rodrigo López | 14 | 79.1 | 5 | 4 | 4.42 | 43 |
| Franklin Morales | 8 | 39.1 | 3 | 2 | 3.43 | 26 |
| Elmer Dessens | 5 | 19.0 | 1 | 1 | 7.58 | 10 |
| Tim Harikkala | 1 | 3.1 | 0 | 0 | 8.10 | 2 |

==== Other pitchers ====
Note: G = Games pitched; IP = Innings pitched; W = Wins; L = Losses; ERA = Earned run average; SO = Strikeouts

| Player | G | IP | W | L | ERA | SO |
|---|---|---|---|---|---|---|
| Taylor Buchholz | 41 | 93.2 | 6 | 5 | 4.23 | 61 |
| Mark Redman | 5 | 19.2 | 2 | 0 | 3.20 | 14 |
| Byung-Hyun Kim | 3 | 6.0 | 1 | 2 | 10.50 | 2 |

==== Relief pitchers ====
Note: G = Games pitched; W = Wins; L = Losses; SV = Saves; ERA = Earned run average; SO = Strikeouts

| Player | G | W | L | SV | ERA | SO |
|---|---|---|---|---|---|---|
| Brian Fuentes | 64 | 3 | 5 | 20 | 3.08 | 56 |
| Manuel Corpas | 78 | 4 | 2 | 19 | 2.08 | 58 |
| Jeremy Affeldt | 75 | 4 | 3 | 0 | 3.51 | 46 |
| LaTroy Hawkins | 62 | 2 | 5 | 0 | 3.42 | 29 |
| Jorge Julio | 58 | 0 | 3 | 0 | 3.93 | 50 |
| Matt Herges | 35 | 5 | 1 | 0 | 2.96 | 30 |
| Tom Martin | 26 | 0 | 0 | 0 | 4.91 | 10 |
| Ramón Ramírez | 22 | 2 | 2 | 0 | 8.31 | 15 |
| Ryan Speier | 20 | 3 | 1 | 0 | 4.00 | 13 |
| Zach McClellan | 12 | 1 | 0 | 0 | 5.79 | 13 |
| Ramón Ortiz | 10 | 1 | 0 | 0 | 7.62 | 7 |
| Denny Bautista | 9 | 2 | 1 | 0 | 12.46 | 8 |
| Alberto Árias | 6 | 1 | 0 | 0 | 4.91 | 3 |
| Bobby Keppel | 4 | 0 | 0 | 0 | 11.25 | 1 |
| Juan Morillo | 4 | 0 | 0 | 0 | 9.82 | 3 |
| Dan Serafini | 3 | 0 | 0 | 0 | 54.00 | 0 |
| Josh Newman | 2 | 0 | 0 | 0 | 4.50 | 3 |
| Darren Clarke | 2 | 0 | 0 | 0 | 0.00 | 1 |

== Notes ==
- Shortstop Troy Tulowitzki turned an unassisted triple play on April 29, 2007, in the top of the 7th inning in a 9-7 victory over the Atlanta Braves. He became only the 13th player in Major League Baseball history to accomplish the feat.
- First baseman Todd Helton hit his 300th career home run on September 16, 2007, in a 13-0 home win over the Florida Marlins. He became the first player to hit 300 home runs for the Colorado Rockies.
- Colorado had an 11-game winning streak toward the end of the 2007 regular season, which set a franchise record for most consecutive wins in a season.
- The Rockies finished ahead of the Los Angeles Dodgers in the division for the first time in franchise history.
- Colorado set an MLB record for fielding percentage in one season (.98925). Despite the Rockies record-setting performance, the National League coaches and players didn't vote in any of Colorado's players for the NL Gold Glove award. The two most puzzling omissions were first baseman Todd Helton and shortstop Troy Tulowitzki. Both players had a better fielding percentage, more total chances, better zone rating, more putouts, more double plays turned, better range factor and more assists than their counterparts who won the award instead (Chicago Cubs first baseman Derrek Lee and Philadelphia Phillies shortstop Jimmy Rollins). Helton also had fewer errors (2) than Lee (7), while Tulowitzki had as many errors as Rollins (11), but did so on 834 total chances compared to Rollins' 717.
- The Rockies became the first team in MLB history to sweep the New York Yankees (on June 19–21) and New York Mets (on July 2–4), both at home, in one season and second team to sweep two New York City teams in one season after the Milwaukee Braves in 1956.
- Baseball America named the Colorado Rockies the "Organization of the Year" for their accomplishments during the 2007 season. "We knew they were bringing great talent through their farm system, but we certainly didn't expect it to pay off with big-league success so quickly", said Will Lingo, editor of Baseball America. "They won with homegrown players, have more talent on the way and have maintained stability in their front office, so they had pretty much everything we look for in an organization."

== Playoffs ==
=== National League Division Series: vs. Philadelphia Phillies ===
Colorado started the series with the Philadelphia Phillies on October 3, 2007, at Citizens Bank Park. The Phillies had a potent offense with NL MVP candidates Ryan Howard, Jimmy Rollins and Chase Utley. The Rockies swept the series in three games with scores of 4-2 in Game 1 and 10-5 in Game 2 in Philadelphia. In Game 3, with the score tied in the bottom of the 8th and two outs, Jeff Baker singled to bring in the go-ahead run. Manny Corpas then pitched a perfect ninth inning to seal the Rockies' first postseason series victory.

=== National League Championship Series: vs. Arizona Diamondbacks ===
Colorado started the series with the Arizona Diamondbacks on October 11, 2007, at Chase Field in Phoenix, Arizona. The Diamondbacks came into the game having swept the Chicago Cubs in the NLDS in three games. Colorado took the first two games, including a 3-2 extra-inning victory in Game 2.

On Sunday, October 14, the Rockies would play in a cold, wet Coors Field in Denver. There, they would find a way to hit the ball over the wall even in the harsh weather. The Rockies hit two homers that night, one in the 1st inning from Matt Holliday and the other in the 6th inning from Yorvit Torrealba. Colorado won the game 4-1. This win gave the Rockies a 20-1 record over their last 21 games. This made them only the third team in the last half-century, and the first in the National League since the 1936, to have a 20-1 stretch at any point of a season.

Colorado won its first NL pennant on Monday, October 15, at home, with the deciding blow, a three-run HR by Matt Holliday, to sweep Arizona (6-4) in the midst of a historic 21-1 sprint with only one loss (September 28) since September 15.

Matt Holliday was the 2007 NLCS MVP Award winner. The Rockies became the first team to win their first seven playoff games in 31 years. It should also be noted that they also became the first team to do it since MLB added the division series to the playoffs. The 2014 Kansas City Royals passed the record bywinning their first eight playoff games in the wild card game, the ALDS, and the ALCS.

=== World Series vs. Boston Red Sox ===
The Rockies lost the first two games at Fenway Park, by a score of 13-1 in Game 1 and 2-1 in Game 2. The 13 runs are the most ever scored by a team in the first game of a World Series. Returning to Coors Field for the final two games, the Rockies lost Game 3 by a score of 10-5 and Game 4 by a score of 4-3.

== Farm system ==
| Level | Team | League | Manager |
|---|---|---|---|
| AAA | Colorado Springs Sky Sox | Pacific Coast League | Tom Runnells |
| AA | Tulsa Drillers | Texas League | Stu Cole |
| A | Modesto Nuts | California League | Jerry Weinstein |
| A | Asheville Tourists | South Atlantic League | Joe Mikulik |
| A-Short Season | Tri-City Dust Devils | Northwest League | Fred Ocasio |
| Rookie | Grand Junction Rockies | Pioneer League | Anthony Sanders |

Records
| Preceded by 2006 | Colorado Rockies seasons 2007 | Succeeded by 2008 |
