= Josh Newman =

Josh Newman may refer to:

- Josh Newman (politician) (born 1964), American politician
- Josh Newman (baseball) (born 1982), American baseball player
