= Darren Clarke (disambiguation) =

Darren Clarke is a Northern Irish golfer.

Darren Clarke may also refer to:

- Darren Clarke (baseball) (born 1981), former Major League Baseball pitcher
- Darren Clarke (Gaelic footballer), Irish sportsperson

== See also ==
- Darren Clark (born 1965), Australian sprinter
