= Edwin Bellorín =

Venezuelan baseball player (born 1982)

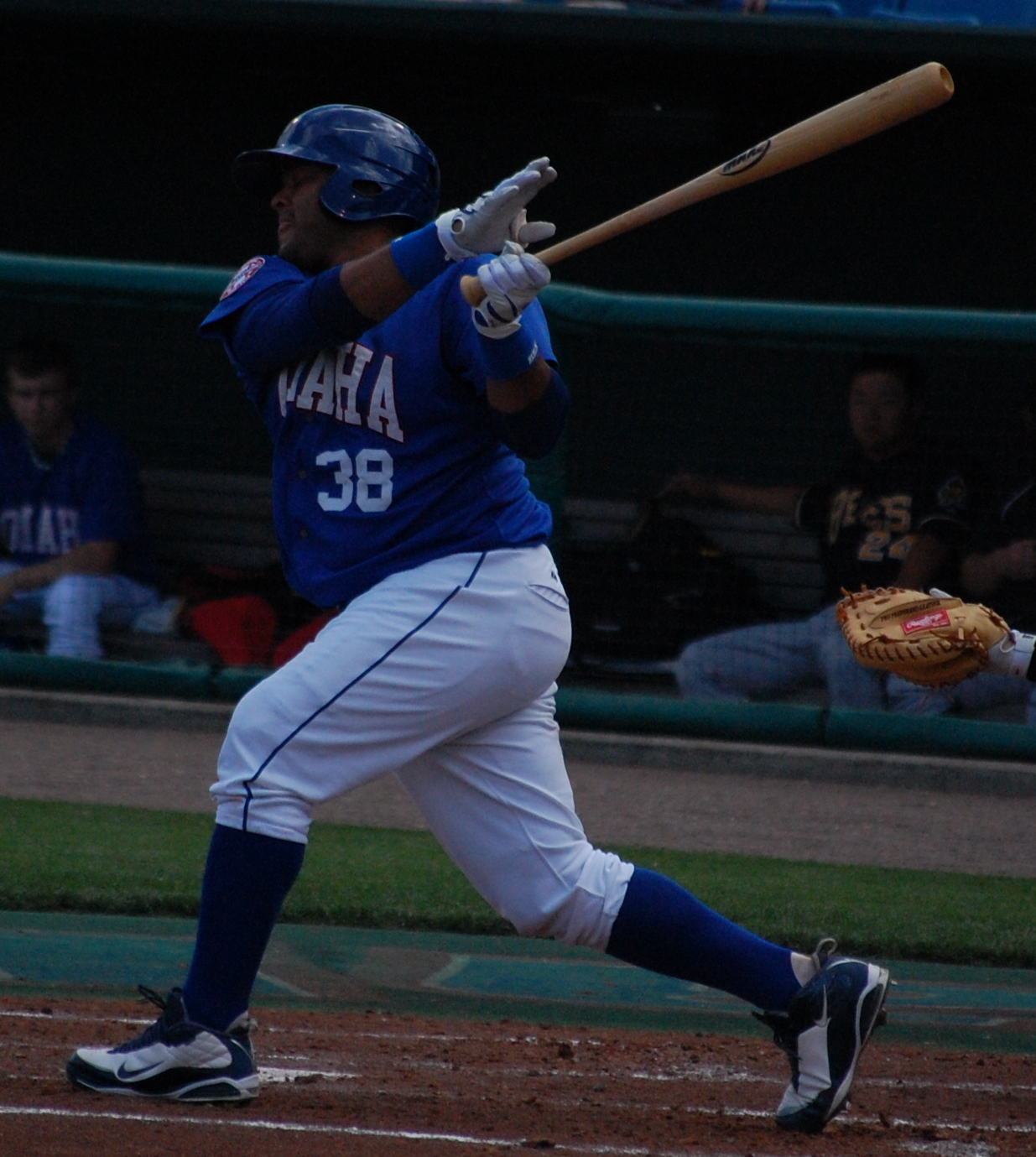
- Bellorin with the Omaha Royals in 2010
- Catcher
- Born: February 21, 1982 (age 44); San Félix, Venezuela
- Batted: Right Threw: Right

MLB debut
- August 7, 2007, for the Colorado Rockies

Last appearance
- June 6, 2009, for the Colorado Rockies

MLB statistics (through 2009 season)
- Batting average: .231
- Home runs: 0
- Runs batted in: 0
- Stats at Baseball Reference

Teams
- Colorado Rockies (2007–2009)

Edwin Daniel Bellorín Morales (born February 21, 1982) is a Venezuelan former catcher.

== Career ==
Bellorín was signed by the Los Angeles Dodgers on September 10, 1998, as an undrafted free agent. He spent six years in the Dodgers minor league system, never playing more than 100 games in a season. He declared free agency on October 15, 2006, and would later sign with the Colorado Rockies for the 2007 season. He began the year with the Colorado Springs Sky Sox, the Rockies Triple-A affiliate. On August 6, 2007, he had his contract purchased by the big league club. He replaced struggling catcher Chris Ianetta on the Rockies' active roster.

On August 7, 2007, Bellorín played in his first MLB game, which was an 11–4 Rockies home win over the Milwaukee Brewers. He made one plate appearance, hitting into a double play, then injured his hamstring running to first base. He was placed on the disabled list afterwards.

On September 24, 2008, Bellorín recorded his first MLB hit, an infield single, off Billy Sadler in the top of the seventh inning of a Rockies 15–6 road victory over the San Francisco Giants.

Bellorín re-signed with the Rockies on January 14, 2009.

He was declared a minor league free agent on October 16, 2009.

The Royals have traded minor league catcher Edwin Bellorin to the Astros for cash considerations, tweets Bob Dutton of the Kansas City Star. The club promoted backstop Manuel Pina from Double-A to the club's Triple-A affiliate in his place.

After spending the first six years of his professional career in the Dodgers' farm system, Bellorin was with the Rockies' Triple-A affiliate from 2007 through 2009. During that span he made eight big league appearances with the club. With Triple-A Omaha in 2010, the 28-year-old hit just .162/.231/.185. Bellorin signed with the Wichita Wingnuts in the 2010 off-season after being released by the Houston Astros.

== See also ==
- List of Major League Baseball players from Venezuela
