= Bill Welke =

American baseball umpire (born 1967)

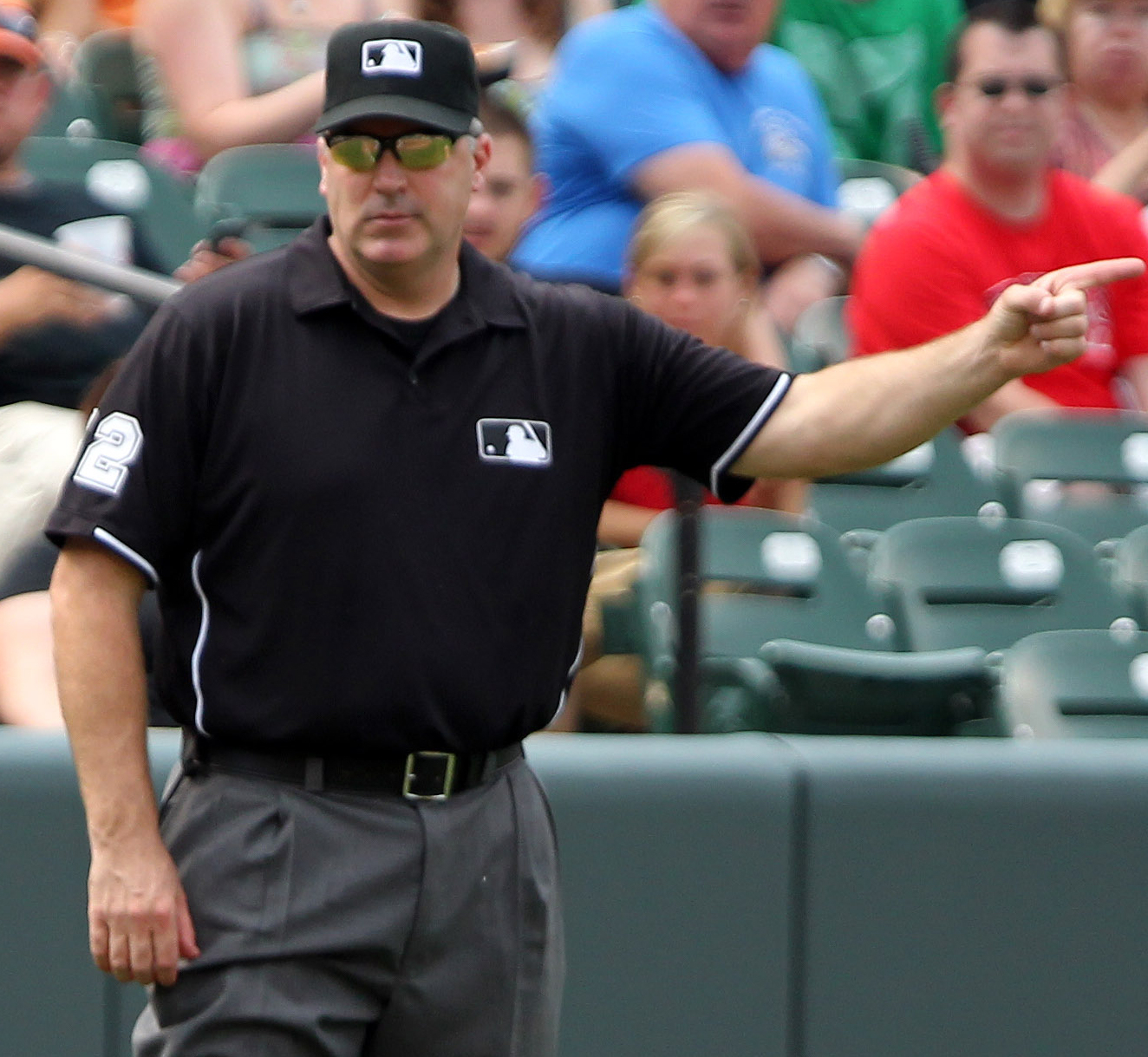
- Welke in 2011
- Born: August 22, 1967 (age 58); Coldwater, Michigan, U.S.

MLB debut
- June 4, 1999

Last appearance
- August 21, 2022

Career highlights and awards
- Special Assignments: All-Star Game (2003, 2016); Wild Card Game (2014, 2016, 2020); Division Series (2003, 2006, 2011, 2015, 2020); League Championship Series (2014, 2016, 2017, 2019); World Series (2015)

William Anthony Welke (born August 22, 1967) is an American former Major League Baseball umpire. He joined the major league staff in 1999 and worked the World Series in 2015. Welke was promoted to crew chief for the 2022 season, and retired following that season.

== Biography ==
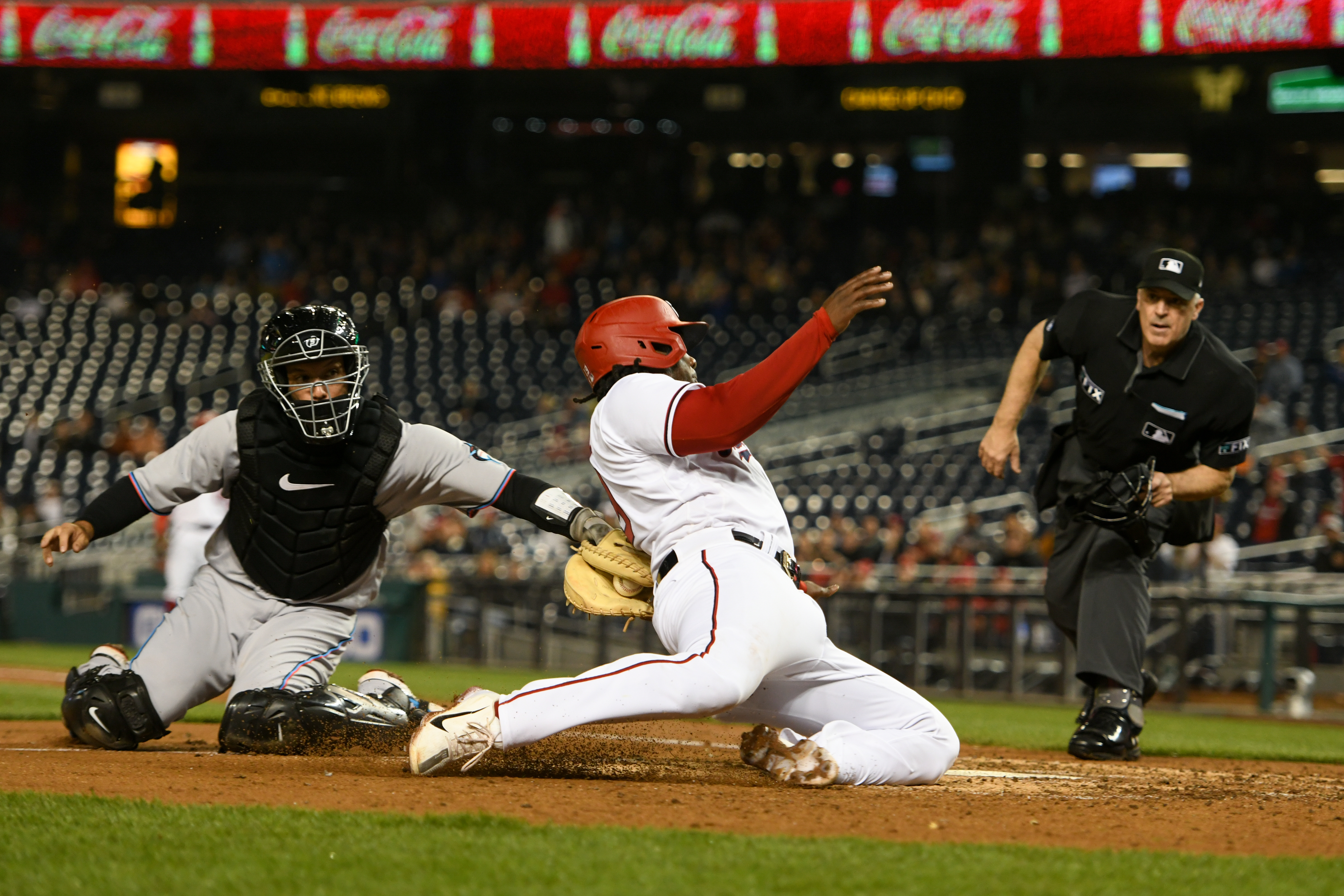
Welke (right) calling a play at the plate during a 2022 game at Nationals Park

Welke is the brother of fellow umpire Tim Welke, and is an alumnus of Western Michigan University. He graduated from Western Michigan University in 1990 with a bachelor's degree in business administration.

Welke previously worked in the Appalachian League (1991), the Midwest League (1992), the Florida State League (1993–1994), the Southern League (1995), the Eastern League (1996), and the International League (1997–1998).

He was an American League umpire in his MLB rookie season in 1999, one year prior to the certification of the World Umpires Association which unified the crews of both major leagues. He has worked the Division Series in 2003, 2006, 2011, 2015 and 2020. He also worked the League Championship Series in 2014, 2016, 2017 and 2019 as well as the 2015 World Series. He was a part of the crew that worked in the 2003 Major League Baseball All-Star Game. Bill was named a Crew Chief for the 2022 MLB season.

== See also ==
- List of Major League Baseball umpires (disambiguation)
