= Ryan Spilborghs =

American baseball player & analyst (born 1979)

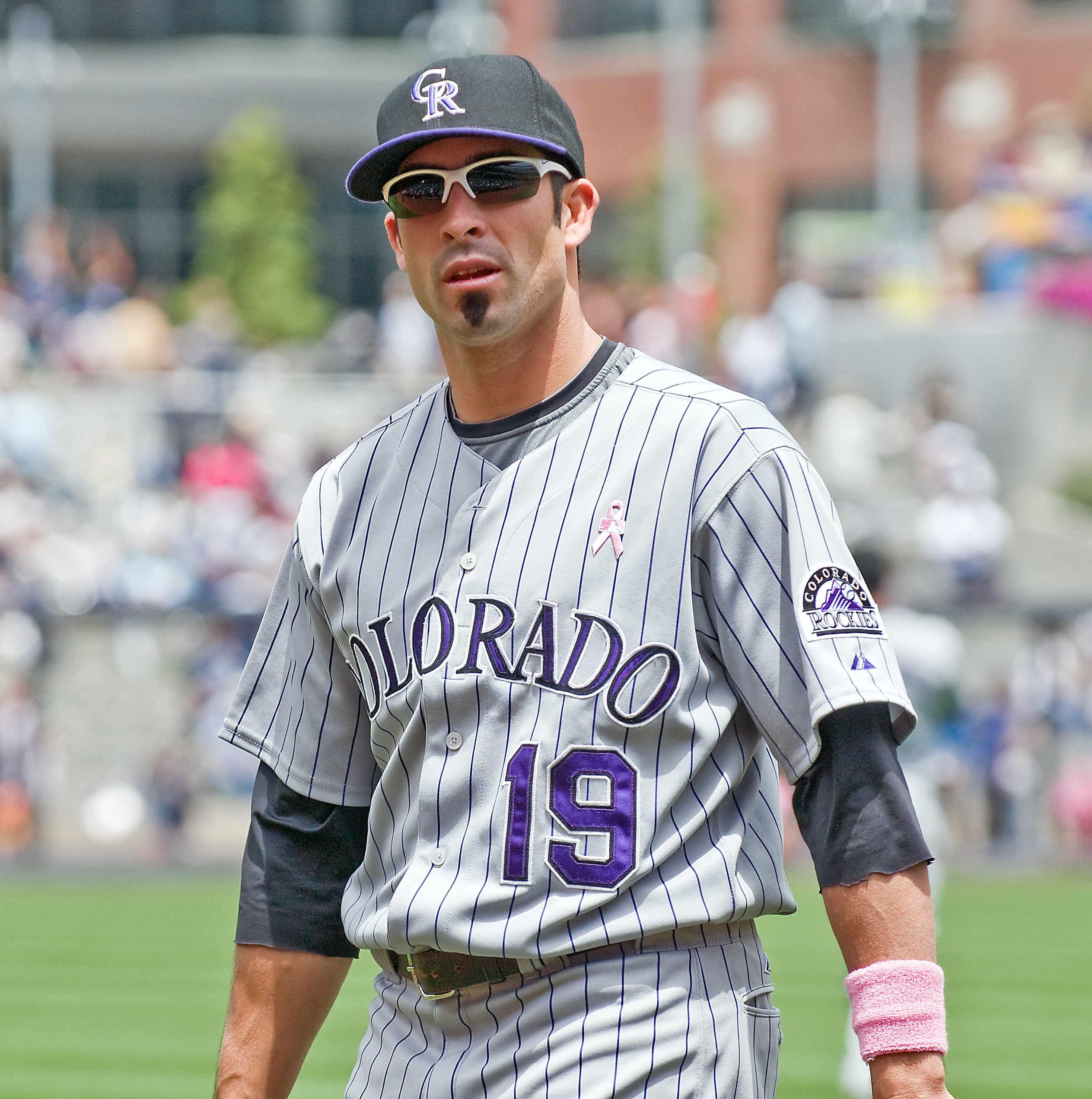
- Spilborghs with the Colorado Rockies
- Outfielder
- Born: September 5, 1979 (age 47); Santa Barbara, California, U.S.
- Batted: Right Threw: Right

Professional debut
- MLB: July 16, 2005, for the Colorado Rockies
- NPB: April 11, 2013, for the Saitama Seibu Lions

Last appearance
- MLB: September 5, 2011, for the Colorado Rockies
- NPB: August 25, 2013, for the Saitama Seibu Lions

MLB statistics
- Batting average: .272
- Home runs: 42
- Runs batted in: 218

NPB statistics
- Batting average: .234
- Home runs: 3
- Runs batted in: 25
- Stats at Baseball Reference

Teams
- Colorado Rockies (2005–2011); Saitama Seibu Lions (2013)

Ryan Adam Rene Jean Spilborghs (born September 5, 1979) is an American baseball broadcaster for ROCKIES.TV & SiriusXM's MLB Network Radio, and a former professional baseball outfielder. He played in Major League Baseball (MLB) for the Colorado Rockies and in Nippon Professional Baseball (NPB) for the Saitama Seibu Lions.

== Baseball career ==
=== College ===
Spilborghs played college ball at the University of California, Santa Barbara, where he was all Big West Conference in 2001. After that season, he played summer league baseball for the Madison Mallards of the Northwoods League, later becoming the first ever Mallard alum to play in the majors.

=== Colorado Rockies ===
Spilborghs was drafted by the Colorado Rockies in the 7th round of the 2002 MLB draft. Between 2002 and 2005, he played for the Tri-City Dust Devils, Asheville Tourists, Visalia Oaks, and Tulsa Drillers.

He made his Major League debut for the Rockies on July 16, 2005, against the Cincinnati Reds and recorded his first hit in that game, a single to right field off of Todd Coffey. That was the only game he played in for the Rockies that year, spending the rest of the year in AAA with the Colorado Springs Sky Sox, where he hit .338 in 68 games. He rejoined the Rockies in 2006 and hit his first home run on May 29 off of Jim Brower of the San Diego Padres.

He began the 2007 season at Triple-A with the Sky Sox, after being beaten out for a roster spot by veteran Steve Finley. After Finley was released by the Rockies, Spilborghs returned to the team. In 2008, he made the team from spring training, serving as the fourth outfielder.

On August 24, 2009, in the 14th inning against the San Francisco Giants with the Rockies down 4–2, Spilborghs homered off pitcher Merkin Valdéz for the first walk-off grand slam in Rockies history. This solo Rockies record was held for over 11 years until Charlie Blackmon, also wearing jersey number 19, hit a walk-off grand slam against the Los Angeles Angels on September 11, 2020.

On December 12, 2011, Spilborghs was non-tendered by the Rockies and became a free agent.

=== Cleveland Indians ===
Spilborghs signed a minor league contract with the Cleveland Indians on January 20, 2012. He also received an invitation to spring training. He failed to make the team and was assigned to the Triple-A Columbus Clippers, where he hit .250 in 21 games.

=== Texas Rangers ===
On May 4, 2012, Spilborghs was traded to the Texas Rangers organization for cash considerations and played for the Triple-A Round Rock Express. In 103 games with Round Rock, he hit .295.

=== Saitama Seibu Lions ===
On December 6, 2012, he agreed to a one-year contract with the Saitama Seibu Lions of the Japanese Pacific League.

== Broadcasting ==
On February 6, 2014, it was announced that Spilborghs had joined the Root Sports Rocky Mountain broadcasting team, where his primary role is sideline reporting during games; however he occasionally provides in booth color commentary. He is an analyst for Rockies pregame and postgame shows, as well as for other programs on the network. Spilborghs currently co-hosts (with CJ Nitkowski) the "Loud Outs" program that airs Saturdays on SiriusXM's MLB Network Radio. Spilborghs announced he was joining Apple TV for Friday night baseball coverage in February 2023. Spilborghs additionally serves as an advisor to sports intelligence company Blitz Analytics, whose platform he uses for broadcast research.

== Personal life ==
Spilborghs is of mixed descent, as his father is Belgian, and his mother is Guatemalan. On July 20, 2009, Ryan's wife gave birth to their daughter and first child, Kierra. Her middle name, Esperanza, was chosen after his mother, who died during spring training earlier in the year.
