= Sean Barker =

American baseball player (born 1980)

- Outfielder
- Born: May 26, 1980 (age 46); Bakersfield, California, U.S.
- Batted: Right Threw: Right

MLB debut
- June 6, 2007, for the Colorado Rockies

Last MLB appearance
- June 15, 2007, for the Colorado Rockies

MLB statistics
- Batting average: .000
- Games played: 3
- Stats at Baseball Reference

Teams
- Colorado Rockies (2007)

Sean Reed Barker (born May 26, 1980) is an American former Major League Baseball outfielder. He made his major league debut on June 6, 2007, with a plate appearance against Chad Qualls of the Houston Astros. He was hit by the very first pitch of his major league career and then stranded on second base after advancing on a fielders choice.

Barker was a sixth-round pick in the 2002 Major League Baseball draft. He was called up from the Colorado Springs Sky Sox to replace Steve Finley when he was designated for assignment. He received the phone call from Tom Runnells, his minor league manager, informing him that he needed to be at Coors Field in time to play in the upcoming series against the Astros, while at the movies watching "Knocked Up". He became a free agent at the end of the 2008 season.

Barker retired after the 2008 season and started Socks-ON, a non-profit organization committed to raising awareness for Myotonic Muscular Dystrophy, a hereditary disease that his mother and brother suffer from. www.socks-on.org
