= Tim Timmons (umpire) =

American baseball umpire (born 1967)

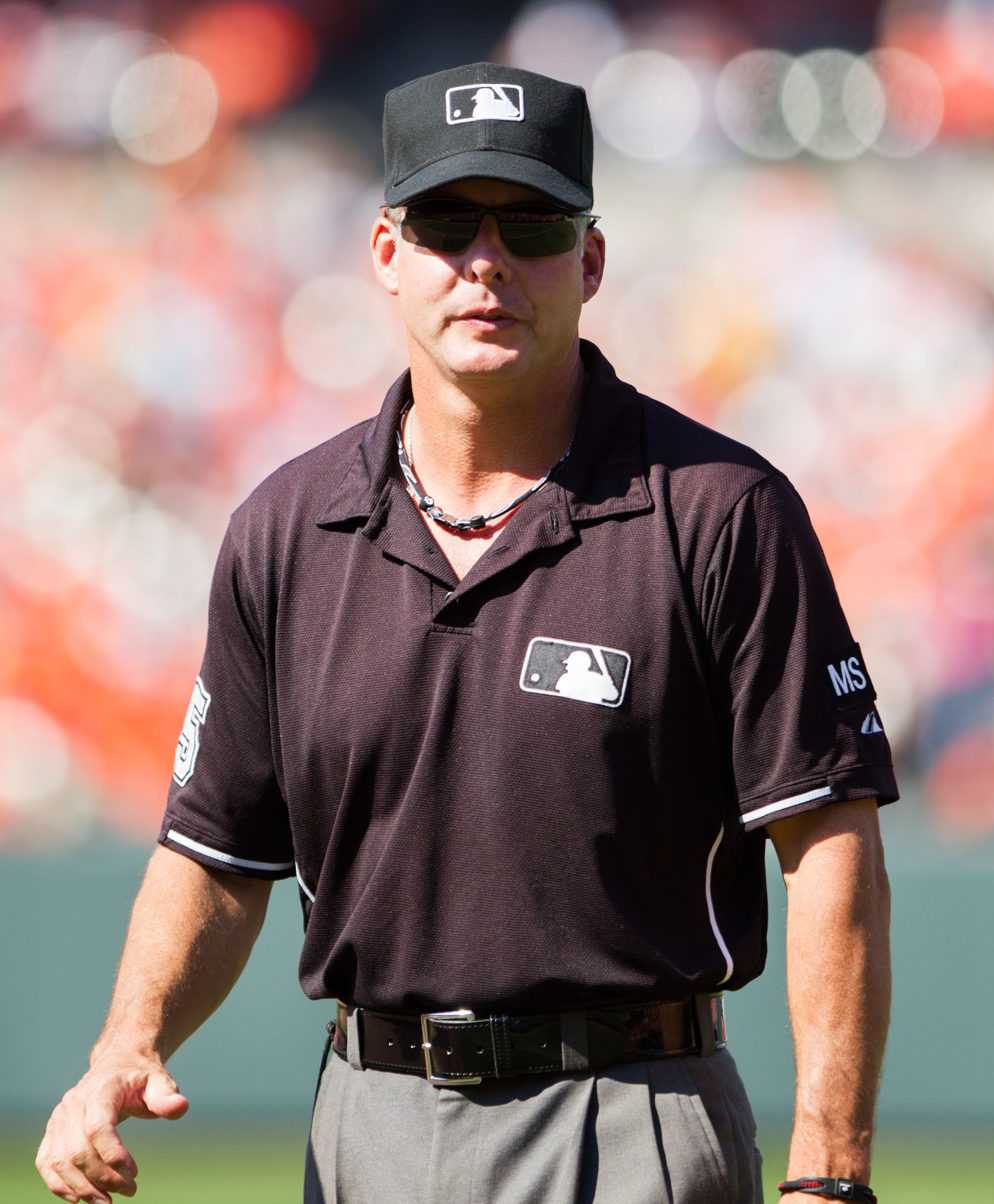
- Timmons in 2012
- Born: December 30, 1967 (age 58); Columbus, Ohio, U.S.

MLB debut
- September 3, 1999

Last appearance
- October 3, 2021

Career highlights and awards
- Special Assignments: World Series (2018); League Championship Series (2011, 2014, 2015, 2020); Division Series (2005, 2009, 2018); All-Star Games (2009, 2019); Wild Card Games (2013, 2020); Replay official for Wild Card Games (2014)

Timothy Forbes Timmons (born December 30, 1967) is an American retired Major League Baseball umpire. After debuting in the National League as a substitute in late 1999, Timmons was promoted to the MLB umpiring staff in 2002. He worked the World Series in 2018 and retired following the 2022 season.

== Early life ==
Tim Timmons was born in Columbus, Ohio. He graduated from Our Lady of Peace Grade School in 1982 and went onto graduate from Bishop Watterson High School in 1986. Timmons played baseball at Muskingum College and then transferred to Ohio State University. He worked as a chef at a country club before attending umpire school.

== Career ==
Timmons umpired in the New York–Penn League, South Atlantic League, Carolina League, Southern League, and International League before becoming a Major League umpire. Prior to his promotion to the major leagues, Timmons served as head of the minor league umpires' union. He served as a major league reserve umpire before he was called up to the majors on a full-time basis in 2001. Timmons was promoted to replace Al Clark, who lost his job related to improper use of plane tickets.

Timmons served as a left field umpire for the 2009 Major League Baseball All-Star Game, and third base umpire for the 2019 Major League Baseball All-Star Game, and has also worked the 2005 and 2009 National League Division Series.

Timmons was behind the plate for Randy Johnson's 300th career win in Washington DC on June 4, 2009.

Timmons was an umpire on Opening Day at Turner Field in 2011. After Bobby Cox threw the ceremonial first pitch, Timmons playfully ejected him.

Timmons was the home plate umpire when Albert Pujols of the Los Angeles Angels hit his 600th career home run against the Minnesota Twins on June 3, 2017.

Timmons was selected to umpire in the 2018 MLB World Series, and was behind the plate for Game One.

Timmons was the home plate umpire when John Means threw his no-hitter against the Seattle Mariners on May 5, 2021

Timmons missed the entire 2022 MLB Season due to injury.

== Personal life ==
Timmons resides in Ohio with his wife and three children. His father Jack umpired in college baseball.

== See also ==
- List of Major League Baseball umpires (disambiguation)
