= Larry Vanover =

American baseball umpire (born 1955)

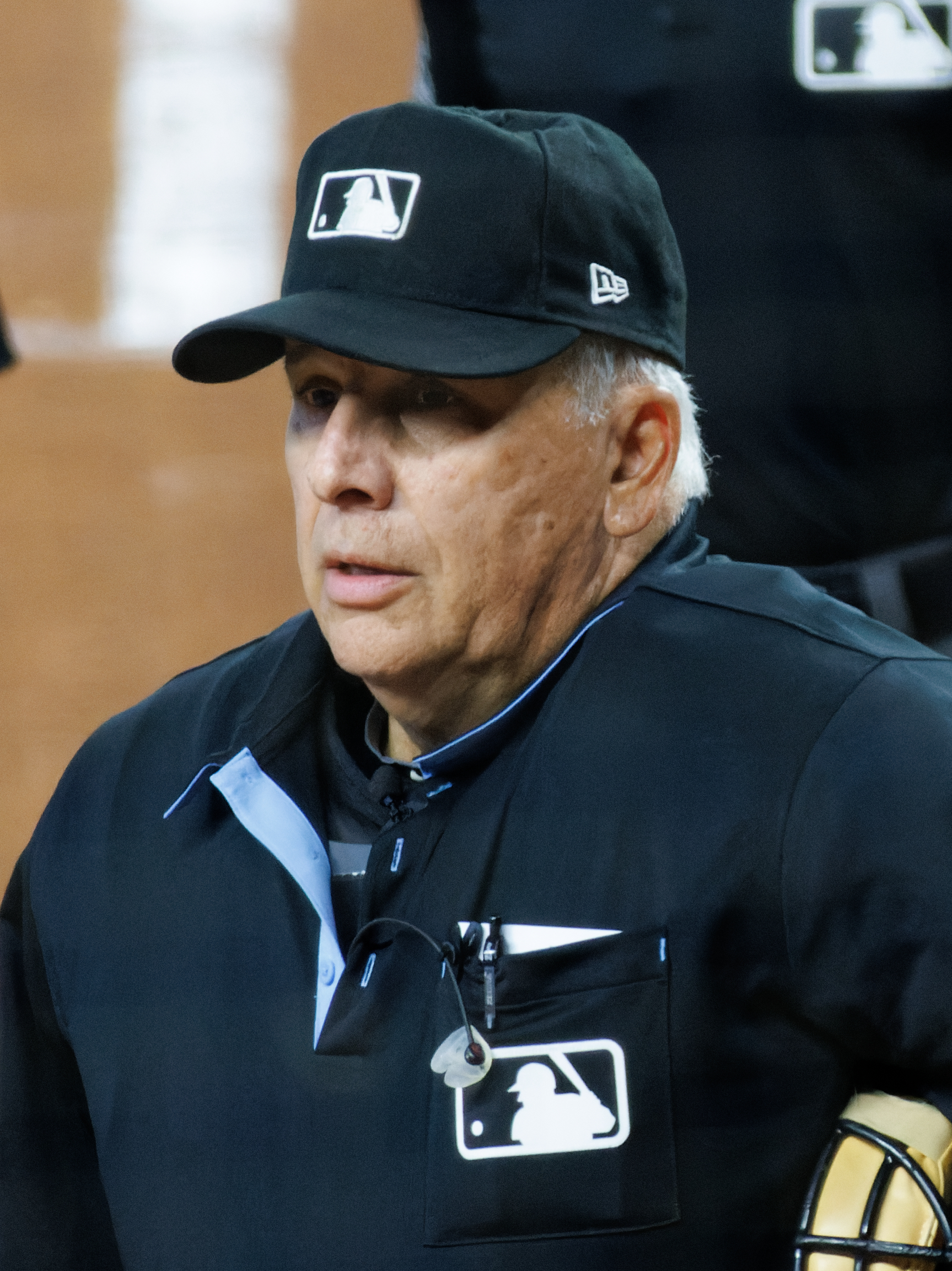
- Vanover in 2023
- Born: August 22, 1955 (age 69); Owensboro, Kentucky, U.S.

MLB debut
- June 25, 1991

Last appearance
- September 22, 2024

Career highlights and awards
- Special assignments: All-Star Game (1999, 2013); Wild Card Game (2020); Division Series (2006, 2013, 2016); League Championship Series (2003, 2007, 2011); World Series (2016); World Baseball Classic (2009, 2023); Fort Bragg Game (2016)

Larry Wayne Vanover (born August 22, 1955) is an American former Major League Baseball umpire. Vanover worked in the National League from 1991 to 1999 and in Major League Baseball from 2002 to 2024. Vanover has umpired two All Star Games (1999, 2013), and in the 2016 World Series. He was promoted to crew chief in 2015. Vanover wore sleeve number 28 during his National League tenure, then changed to 27 after his return to the MLB umpiring staff in 2002. Vanover was the oldest umpire in major league history at the time of his retirement.

== Career ==
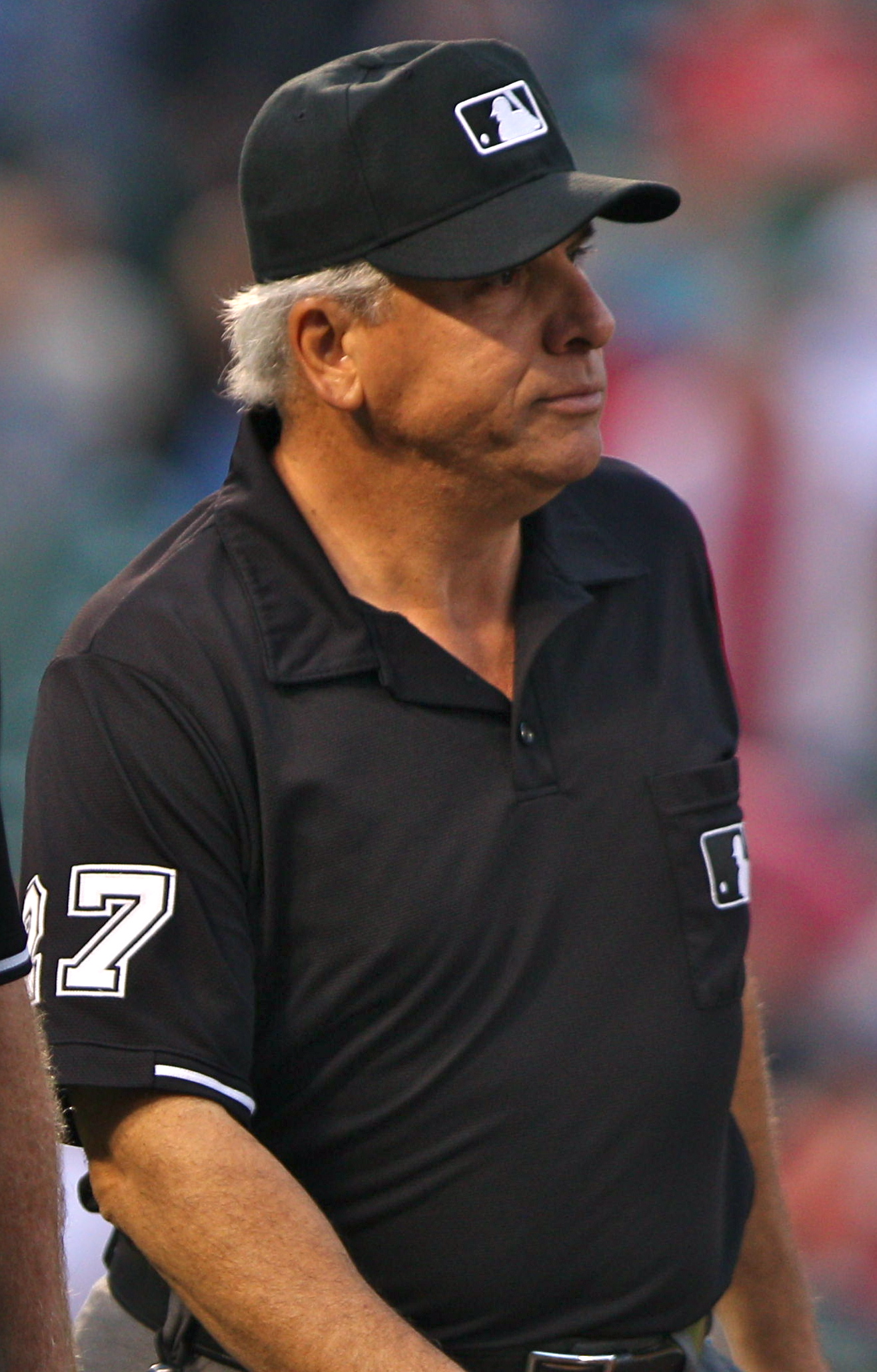
Vanover in 2012

Vanover worked in several minor leagues before his major league debut in 1991. He officiated in the South Atlantic League, Midwest League, Southern League, American Association, Pacific Coast League, International League and Venezuelan League.

Vanover was behind the plate when Marge Schott came on the field just prior to an April 1996 Astros–Reds doubleheader and apologized to Vanover for her Opening Day comments following the death of umpire John McSherry. The Opening Day game had been postponed after McSherry collapsed on the field; he died at a local hospital. After the game was postponed, Schott had said, "I feel cheated."

Vanover was one of 22 umpires who resigned during the 1999 Major League Umpires Association mass resignation. The negotiation strategy failed when baseball officials simply accepted the resignations and hired replacement umpires. After a protracted legal battle, Vanover and eight other umpires regained their major league jobs for the 2002 season.

MLB appointed Vanover to serve as crew chief for the 2014 Legend Series at Rod Carew Stadium in Panama City, Panama, on March 15–16. Vanover spent the 2014 season as an interim crew chief while regular crew chief Tim McClelland was on the disabled list. In September 2014, Vanover was the home plate umpire for Derek Jeter's final game. Vanover was officially promoted to permanent crew chief upon McClelland's retirement prior to the 2015 season. On May 24, 2019, Vanover umpired his 3,000th MLB game.

On April 12, 2023, Vanover was hit in the head by Cleveland Guardians infielder Andrés Giménez's relay throw to home attempting to throw out Oswaldo Cabrera. Vanover was hospitalized for his non-life-threatening injuries. He retired following the 2024 season.

== See also ==
- List of Major League Baseball umpires (disambiguation)
