= Joe Koshansky =

American baseball player (born 1982)

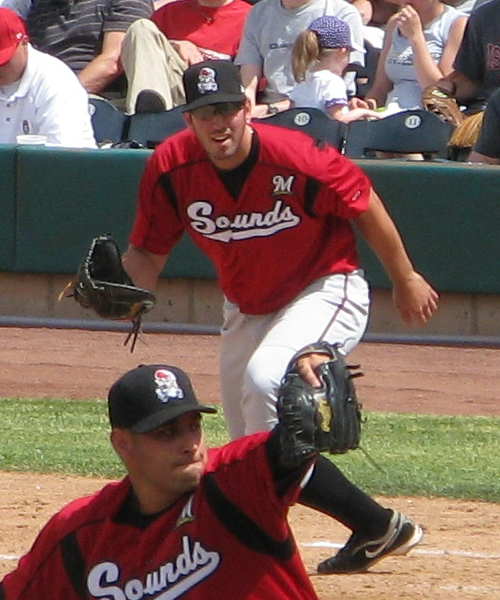
- Koshansky with the Nashville Sounds in 2010.
- First baseman
- Born: May 26, 1982 (age 43); Shreveport, Louisiana, U.S.
- Batted: Left Threw: Left

MLB debut
- September 1, 2007, for the Colorado Rockies

Last MLB appearance
- September 27, 2008, for the Colorado Rockies

MLB statistics
- Batting average: .180
- Home runs: 3
- Runs batted in: 10
- Stats at Baseball Reference

Teams
- Colorado Rockies (2007–2008)

Joseph Stephen Koshansky (born May 26, 1982) is a former Major League Baseball first baseman.

== Early life ==
Koshansky graduated from Chantilly High School in Chantilly, Virginia, in 2000. He played baseball as a pitcher and first baseman. He graduated from the University of Virginia with a degree in economics.

== Professional career ==
Koshansky was selected by the Colorado Rockies in the 6th round (170th overall) in the 2004 Major League Baseball draft.

=== 2004 ===
After getting drafted, Koshansky played for the Class A Tri-City Dust Devils. He played in 66 games and batted .234 with 12 home runs. His strikeout numbers were a problem though as he ranked second in the league with 84.

=== 2005 ===
Koshansky began the 2005 season with the Class A Asheville Tourists. He played 120 games for the Tourists, in which he batted .291 with 36 home runs in 453 at bats. He was promoted to the Double-A Tulsa Drillers on August 23. He played 12 games for them in which he batted .267 with 2 home runs. His performance earned him Baseball America's Rockies Minor League Player of the Year Award. He was second in the league to Brandon Wood in home runs, was third in extra base hits, fourth in total bases, and was fifth in RBIs. He was also awarded the South Atlantic League Hitter of the Week Award on two occasions.

=== 2006 ===
In 2006, Koshansky played for the Double-A Tulsa Drillers. He was selected as the Rockies Minor League Player of the Year again when he hit .284 with 31 home runs in 132 games for Tulsa. He set the Drillers franchise record for RBI with 109. He was also second in the league in home runs and slugging percentage. He also played in the Future's Game at PNC Park in Pittsburgh. In the game, he hit a two-run home run to help lead the U.S. team over the World team, 8–5. Following the season, he was named Baseball America's 13th best prospect in the Texas League and was also named the best power hitter in the Rockies minor league organization.

=== 2007 ===
Koshansky began 2007 with the Triple-A Colorado Springs Sky Sox. Through 136 games, he batted .295 with 21 home runs and 99 RBI. His strong performance earned him a callup to the Colorado Rockies on September 1 when rosters expanded. He made his major league debut on that same day against the Arizona Diamondbacks as a pinch hitter in the ninth inning against Brandon Lyon. He grounded out to end the game.

=== 2008 ===
On August 12, 2008, Koshanksky hit for the cycle for the Sky Sox for the second time that season; he also hit for the cycle on May 24. He became the first player in Sky Sox history to hit for the cycle twice in one season and the first player in the minors to do it since 2006.

On July 5, 2008, Koshansky started at first base for the Rockies, the first major league start of his career. Koshansky also hit his first career home run, a solo shot in the bottom of the second inning off Ryan Tucker, in a 12–6 home win over the Florida Marlins.

On September 17, 2008, Koshansky hit another home run off Josh Geer in a 1-0 win over the San Diego Padres.

=== 2009 ===
On March 29, 2009, Koshansky was claimed off waivers by the Texas Rangers and was optioned to Triple-A Oklahoma. Days later he was claimed off waivers by the Milwaukee Brewers and optioned to the Triple-A Nashville Sounds.

=== 2011 ===
On April 30, 2011, in a game against the Bowie Baysox that lasted 18 innings, Koshansky went 0 for 8 with 7 strikeouts, tying a Minor League Baseball record.
