= Darren Clarke (baseball) =

American baseball player (born 1981)

- Relief pitcher
- Born: March 18, 1981 (age 44); San Diego, California
- Batted: Right Threw: Right

MLB debut
- May 18, 2007, for the Colorado Rockies

Last MLB appearance
- May 20, 2007, for the Colorado Rockies

MLB statistics
- Win–loss record: 0-0
- Earned run average: 0.00
- Strikeouts: 1
- Stats at Baseball Reference

Teams
- Colorado Rockies (2007)

Darren Lawrence Clarke (born March 18, 1981) is a former Major League Baseball right-handed pitcher who played for the Colorado Rockies. After graduating from high school, the Rockies selected him in the 33rd round of the 1999 Major League Baseball draft, but he did not sign with them, opting instead to attend South Florida Community College (SFCC). He was again selected by the Rockies in the 35th round of the 2000 Major League Baseball draft and was signed by them May 7, 2001, following his sophomore year at SFCC. He stands 6 feet 8 inches (2.03 m) and his playing weight is listed at 235 pounds (107 kg).

Clarke spent the 2001 season as a starting pitcher for the Casper Rockies of the Pioneer League, compiling a 3–6 win–loss record and a 6.02 ERA in 14 starts. In 2002, he was with the Rockies' Northwest League affiliate, Tri-City Dust Devils where he was 4–3 with a 6.98 ERA. In 2003, he was in the starting rotation of the Asheville Tourists of the South Atlantic League. In 27 games (25 starts) for the Tourists, he was 8–6 with a 3.83 ERA. The Rockies promoted him to their California League affiliate, Visalia Oaks, in 2004, but an elbow injury limited him to just 8 games with the Oaks (1–3, 7.39 ERA).

In 2005, the Rockies converted Clarke into a relief pitcher and he began the season with their new California League affiliate in Modesto, but was placed on the disabled list on April 7. When he returned from the disabled list, he made a rehabilitation assignment to Tri-City, where in 12 appearances, he posted a 0.64 ERA and 3 saves for the Dust Devils. He returned to Modesto on July 20 and made 5 relief appearances (0–0, 9.00 ERA) before a recurrence of the elbow injury ended his season on August 30.

Clarke was with Modesto again in 2006 and pitched effectively out of their bullpen but was again plagued by injuries; first with inflammation in his pitching shoulder in early June and then with a strained latissimus dorsi muscle, which ended his season on June 27. He was 1–1 with the Nuts with 5 saves and a 1.35 ERA. His performance earned him a place on the California League All-Star team, but he was unable to pitch due to injury.

In 2007, Clarke began the season in the bullpen of the Double-A Tulsa Drillers of the Texas League. The Rockies called him up to their big league roster where he made his major league debut on May 18 against the Kansas City Royals.

Clarke was not offered a new contract by the Rockies and became a free agent on December 12, 2007. The Rockies re-signed him for 2008 and he spent the entire season with Double-A Tulsa, becoming a free agent again after the season.
