= Josh Newman (baseball) =

American baseball player (born 1982)

Purdue Boilermakers
- Relief pitcher
- Born: June 11, 1982 (age 44); Portsmouth, Ohio, U.S.
- Batted: Left Threw: Left

MLB debut
- September 12, 2007, for the Colorado Rockies

Last MLB appearance
- August 21, 2008, for the Kansas City Royals

MLB statistics
- Win–loss record: 0–0
- Earned run average: 8.15
- Strikeouts: 11
- Stats at Baseball Reference

Teams
- Colorado Rockies (2007–2008); Kansas City Royals (2008)

Joshua Paul Newman (born June 11, 1982) is an American baseball coach and former relief pitcher, who is the current pitching coach of the Purdue Boilermakers. He played in Major League Baseball (MLB) from 2007 and 2008 for the Colorado Rockies and Kansas City Royals.

== Biography ==
A native of Wheelersburg, Ohio, Newman played college baseball at Ohio State, and in 2002 he played collegiate summer baseball with the Harwich Mariners of the Cape Cod Baseball League. He was selected by the Rockies in the 19th round of the 2004 MLB draft.

Newman was claimed off waivers by the Kansas City Royals from the Rockies on July 10, 2008. On May 25, 2009, Newman was released by the Royals. He was signed by the Camden Riversharks of the Atlantic League of Professional Baseball on June 27, 2009.
