= Marty Lees =

American baseball coach

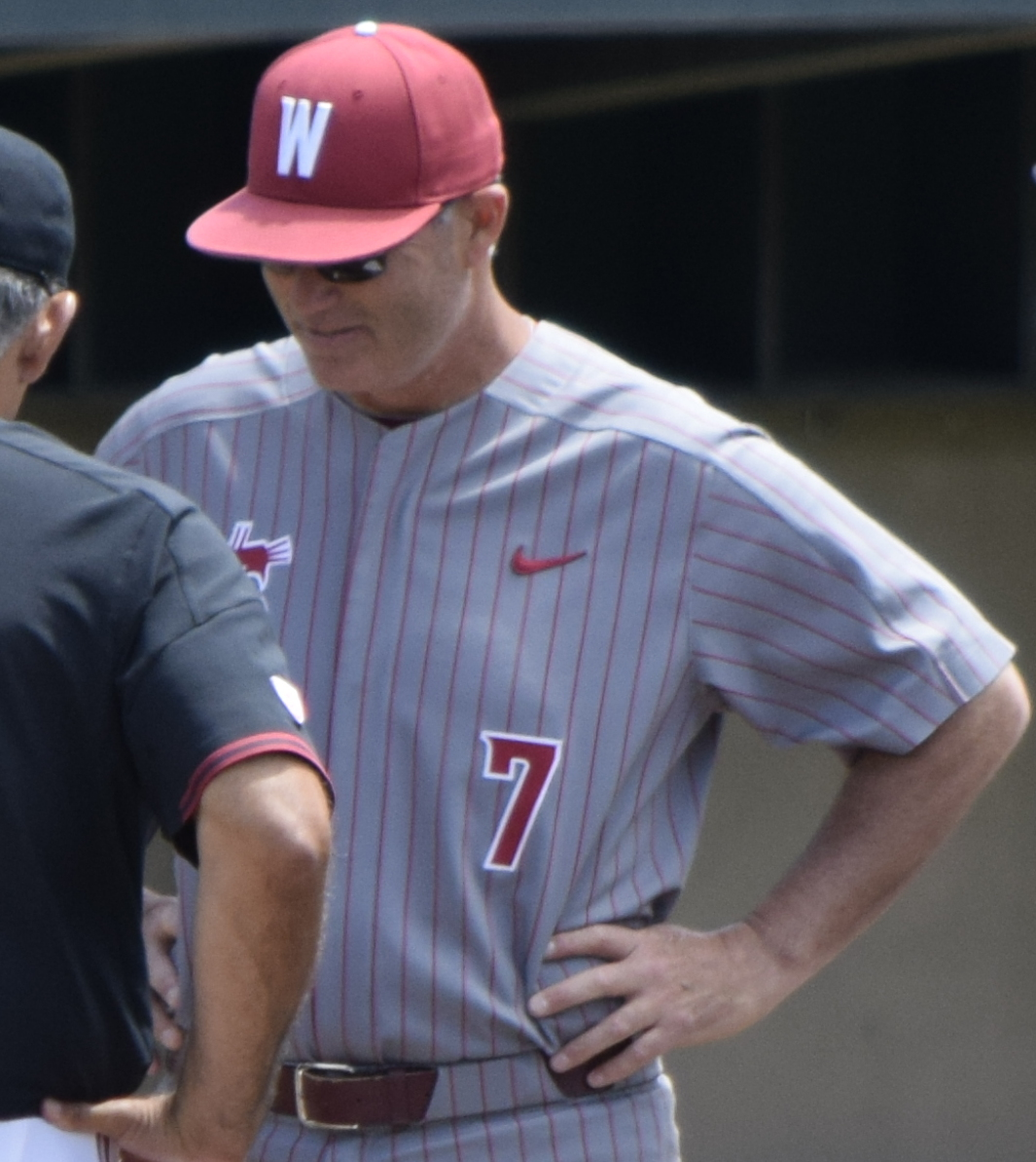
- Lees with Washington State in 2018

Biographical details
- Education: Western Oregon University

Playing career
- 1989–1990: Lane Community College
- 1991–1993: Western Oregon

Coaching career (HC unless noted)
- 1998–1999: Oakridge (OR)
- 2000–2003: Harrisburg (OR)
- 2002–2003: Oregon State (Vol. asst.)
- 2005–2012: Oregon State (asst.)
- 2013–2015: Oklahoma State (asst.)
- 2016–2019: Washington State
- 2020–2021: Oklahoma State (asst.)
- 2023–: Stillwater (OK)

Head coaching record
- Overall: 68–133–1
- Tournaments: NCAA: 0–0

Marty Lees is an American college baseball coach and former player who is currently the head coach and physical education teacher at Stillwater High School, a position he's held since 2023. Lees was the head coach of the Washington State Cougars from 2016 to 2019.

== Playing career ==
Lees attended Lakeview High School in Lakeview, Oregon, where he was a member of the baseball and basketball teams. Upon graduation from Lakeview, Lees enrolled at Lane Community College, where he continued his baseball and basketball career. Lees then went on to Western Oregon University, where he continued his baseball career.

== Coaching career ==
From 1998 to 1999, Lees was the head coach of Oakridge High School in Oakridge, Oregon. In 2000, Lees became the head coach for Harrisburg. Lees also coached the girls' basketball team at Harrisburg. Lees joined the Oregon State Beavers baseball program in 2002 as a volunteer assistant, while still coaching at Harrisburg. Lees was promoted to a full-time assistant coach in 2004. Lees coached third base and instructed base runners. The Beavers won back-to-back College World Series in 2006 and 2007.

On June 25, 2012, Lees left Oregon State for an associate head coaching position with the Oklahoma State Cowboys baseball program. Lees helped the Cowboys to 3 straight NCAA Regional trips, including a Super Regional trip in 2014.

On June 3, 2015, Lees was announced as the head coach of Washington State Cougars baseball. He was fired May 21, 2019 after compiling a record of 68–133–2.

In June 2019, Lees returned to Oklahoma State as an assistant.

In June 2023, Lees joined the Chatham Anglers of the Cape Cod Baseball League as an assistant under Tom Holliday. On July 12, following Holliday's resignation, it was announced that Lees would serve as acting manager for the remainder of the 2023 season. The Anglers went 3–11–1 under Lees. On July 28, having been named the head coach at Stillwater High School, Lees departed with six games remaining. Todd Shelton was named Chatham's interim manager for the final six games of the regular season.

On July 25, 2023, Lees was announced as the head baseball coach and physical education teacher at Stillwater High School.

== Head coaching record ==
Record table
Season	Team	Overall	Conference	Standing	Postseason
Washington State Cougars (Pac-12 Conference) (2016–2019)
2016	Washington State	17–29	10–17	11th	
2017	Washington State	24–29	10–20	9th	
2018	Washington State	16–33–1	8–21–1	10th	
2019	Washington State	11–42–1	3–26–1	11th	
Washington State:		68–133–1	31–84–1		
Total:		68–133–1			
National champion Postseason invitational champion Conference regular season champion Conference regular season and conference tournament champion Division regular season champion Division regular season and conference tournament champion Conference tournament champion
