= Harrisburg School District =

Harrisburg School District may refer to:

- Harrisburg School District (Arkansas)
- Harrisburg Community Unit School District 3, Illinois
- Harrisburg R-VIII School District, Missouri
- Harrisburg School District (Oregon)
- Harrisburg School District (Pennsylvania)
- Harrisburg School District (South Dakota)
- Harrisburg School District (Texas)
