= Josh Holliday =

American baseball coach (born 1976)

Current position
- Title: Head coach
- Team: Oklahoma State
- Conference: Big 12
- Record: 508–274–2 (.649)

Biographical details
- Born: September 14, 1976 (age 50); Mesa, Arizona, U.S.
- Education: Oklahoma State

Playing career
- 1996–1999: Oklahoma State
- 1999: St. Catharines Stompers
- 2000: Hagerstown Suns

Coaching career (HC unless noted)
- 2001–2003: Oklahoma State (asst.)
- 2004: NC State (asst.)
- 2005–2007: Georgia Tech (asst.)
- 2007–2009: Arizona State (asst.)
- 2010–2012: Vanderbilt (asst.)
- 2013–present: Oklahoma State

Head coaching record
- Overall: 508–274–2 (.649)
- Tournaments: Big 12: 27–17; NCAA: 29–27

Accomplishments and honors

Championships
- 2× Big 12 Regular Season (2014, 2023); 3× Big 12 Tournament (2017, 2019, 2024)

Awards
- College World Series (2016); Big 12 Coach of the Year (2014)

Joshua S. Holliday (born September 14, 1976) is an American college baseball coach and former professional player in Minor League Baseball. Currently the head coach of the Oklahoma State Cowboys baseball team, he was hired to this position prior to the 2013 season. In 2014, Holliday was the Big 12 Conference Baseball Coach of the Year as OSU claimed the conference regular season championship.

Before becoming head coach of the Cowboys, Holliday played college baseball for OSU while attending as a student. He was drafted by the Toronto Blue Jays in 1999, for whom he played two seasons in the minor leagues. He then returned to his alma mater as an assistant coach and subsequently coached as an assistant for NC State, Georgia Tech, Arizona State and Vanderbilt.

== College playing career ==
The Minnesota Twins drafted Holliday in the 14th round after high school in 1995, but he did not sign. He instead attended Oklahoma State University (OSU) and played college baseball there for the Cowboys. He earned four varsity letters at OSU while playing in 256 games, second all-time with the Cowboys. He ranks highly in many statistical categories among Cowboy greats, placing seventh in home runs (HR) with 53, first in walks (BB) with 225, and in the top five in runs, hits, doubles, total bases, runs batted in (RBI), and hit by pitches. In 1996, he played collegiate summer baseball with the Orleans Cardinals of the Cape Cod Baseball League.

== Minor league career (1999–2000) ==
After his college career, Holliday was drafted for a second time. The Toronto Blue Jays selected him in the ninth round of the 1999 amateur draft. He played for two seasons in Minor League Baseball in the Toronto organization. A versatile player, he frequently played first base and catcher, and also appeared at third base, right field and left field.

In 1999 with the Class A short-season St. Catharines Stompers, Holliday produced a .902 on-base plus slugging (OPS) in 71 games. He batted .255, but managed to score 50 runs due in part to drawing 63 walks for a .439 on-base percentage. He also hit 13 doubles and 10 home runs for a .463 slugging percentage. The next season with the Class A Hagerstown Suns, his batting average slipped to .220 in 74 games, but his 52 BB placed his OBP at .381 and he scored 46 runs. His OBP in those two season was .410 in spite of a combined .237 batting average.

== Coaching career (2001–present) ==
Prior to the 2001 season, Holliday returned to Stillwater to become a student assistant coach under his father, head coach Tom Holliday. He became a full-time staff member the following season and served for two years. Holliday spent the 2004 season at NC State, who made an NCAA tournament appearance. Following his single season in Raleigh, Holliday was hired as an assistant at ACC rival Georgia Tech, who reached the 2006 College World Series, won the 2005 ACC Tournament, and were among the nation's elite in several offensive categories. Holliday was named to the staff of Arizona State beginning in 2008. During his tenure, the Sun Devils signed the nation's top recruiting class and appeared in the 2009 College World Series. For his efforts, Vanderbilt named him recruiting coordinator and assistant coach in 2010. The Commodores made a run to the College World Series with Holliday on the staff. It was the program's first College World Series appearance. As recruiting coordinator at Vanderbilt, Holliday helped assemble a roster that would set a SEC record for regular season conference wins with a 26–3 record in 2013, his first year as head coach in Stillwater.

On June 8, 2012, Holliday was named head coach of the Oklahoma State Cowboys, returning to his childhood home to lead the program for which he played. He is the first head coach at OSU who also played for the Cowboys.

== Head coaching record ==
Below is a table of Holliday's yearly records as an NCAA head baseball coach.

Record table
Season	Team	Overall	Conference	Standing	Postseason
Oklahoma State Cowboys (Big 12 Conference) (2013–present)
2013	Oklahoma State	41–19	13–10	2nd	NCAA regional
2014	Oklahoma State	48–16	18–6	1st	NCAA Super Regional
2015	Oklahoma State	38–20	14–8	2nd	NCAA regional
2016	Oklahoma State	43–22	16–8	2nd	College World Series
2017	Oklahoma State	30–27	8–13	8th	NCAA regional
2018	Oklahoma State	31–26–1	16–8	2nd	NCAA regional
2019	Oklahoma State	40–21	14–9	3rd	NCAA Super Regional
2020	Oklahoma State	13–5	0–0		Season canceled due to COVID-19
2021	Oklahoma State	36–19–1	12–12	4th	NCAA regional
2022	Oklahoma State	42–22	15–9	T–2nd	NCAA regional
2023	Oklahoma State	41–20	15–9	T–1st	NCAA regional
2024	Oklahoma State	42–19	19–9	2nd	NCAA regional
2025	Oklahoma State	30–25	15–12	7th	NCAA regional
2026	Oklahoma State	39–22	18–12	5th	NCAA regional
Oklahoma State:		508–274–2 (.649)	189–129 (.594)		
Total:		508–274–2 (.649)			
National champion Postseason invitational champion Conference regular season champion Conference regular season and conference tournament champion Division regular season champion Division regular season and conference tournament champion Conference tournament champion

== Personal life ==
Holliday's father was an assistant coach at Oklahoma State while Josh grew up and while he played at Oklahoma State, and the elder Holliday later served as head coach while Josh was an assistant. Holliday's brother, Matt Holliday is a retired Major League Baseball outfielder/designated hitter and All-Star and has previously played for the New York Yankees, St. Louis Cardinals, the Colorado Rockies, and the Oakland Athletics. In July 2019, Matt joined his brother's coaching staff as OSU's volunteer assistant.

Holliday is married and has two children. His son, Brady, plays baseball in high school. His nephews are Jackson and Ethan Holliday.

== See also ==
- List of current NCAA Division I baseball coaches
