= Tom Holliday (baseball) =

American college baseball coach (born 1953)

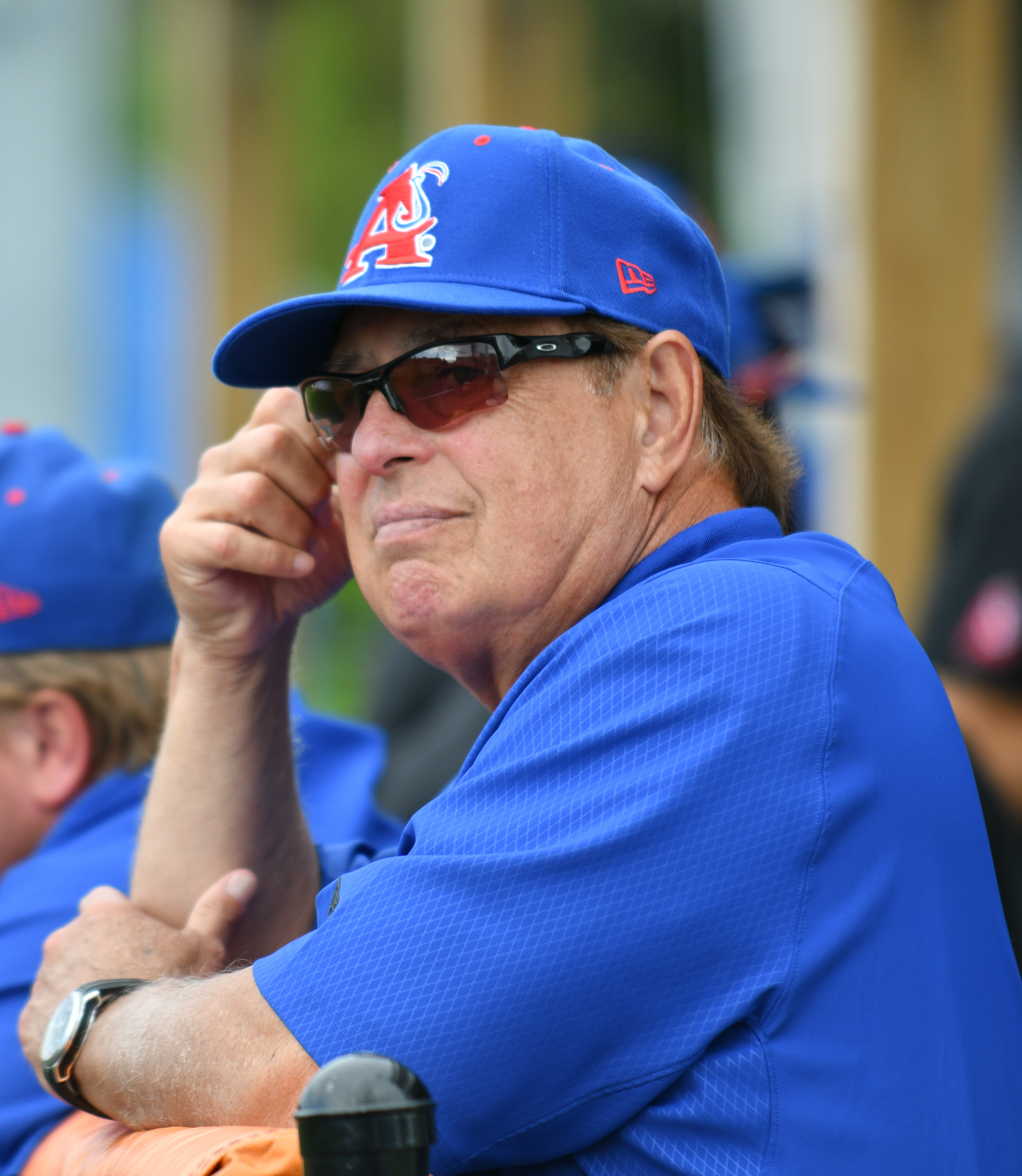
- Holliday with the Chatham Anglers in 2021

Biographical details
- Born: March 5, 1953 (age 73); Uniontown, Pennsylvania, U.S.

Playing career
- 1972–1973: Yavapai
- 1974–1975: Miami (FL)

Coaching career (HC unless noted)
- 1976: Miami (FL) (GA)
- 1977: Arizona State (GA)
- 1978–1996: Oklahoma State (P/RC)
- 1997–2003: Oklahoma State
- 2004–2006: Texas (P)
- 2007–2014: NC State (P)
- 2015: Auburn (P/AHC)

Head coaching record
- Overall: 281–150

Tom Holliday (born March 5, 1953) is an American former college baseball coach and current broadcaster.

Holliday spent 40 consecutive years as either a head coach or assistant coach in Division 1 college baseball from 1976–2015, during which his teams made 17 College World Series appearances and won two NCAA National Championships (Arizona State in 1977 & Texas in 2005). He managed the Chatham Anglers of the Cape Cod Baseball League from 2018 to 2023.

== Career ==
Holliday spent 26 of his 40 years as an NCAA baseball coach at Oklahoma State University, where he was the head coach from 1997 to 2003. Those seven seasons represent Holliday's only collegiate head coaching experience, highlighted by a College World Series appearance in 1999. Before that, he was Oklahoma State's pitching coach and recruiting coordinator for 19 years, from 1978 to 1996.

Holliday was the pitching coach at the University of Texas from 2004 to 2006, and was part of the Longhorns' 2005 National Championship team. He then became the pitching coach and associate head coach at North Carolina State University from 2007–2014. Holliday's final season coaching an NCAA baseball program was in 2015, when he spent one year as the pitching coach at Auburn University.

The Chatham Anglers of the Cape Cod Baseball League named Holliday their manager on August 10, 2017. Holliday succeeded John Schiffner, then the winningest manager in league history, who retired after 25 years as Chatham's manager following the 2017 season to become an assistant coach at the University of Maine. Under Holliday, the Anglers amassed a record of 84-91-18. In his first season, he led the club to the Cape League Championship Series before falling to the Wareham Gatemen. On June 12, 2023, in the middle of his fifth season with Chatham, Holliday resigned from the position of Anglers manager, citing "personal health reasons."

Following his Division One coaching career, Holliday launched his broadcasting career as an analyst with Fox College Sports. He also served as Dave Hunziker's analyst for Oklahoma State games on Big 12 Now on ESPN+ beginning in 2020.

== Personal ==
Both of Holliday's sons are prominent baseball figures. His younger son, Matt Holliday, is a retired Major League outfielder and a 2011 World Series Champion with the St. Louis Cardinals. His older son, Josh Holliday, is the head baseball coach at Oklahoma State University. Tom's grandsons include Jackson and Ethan Holliday.

== Head coaching record ==
Record table
| Season | Team | Overall | Conference | Standing | Postseason |
|---|---|---|---|---|---|
Oklahoma State Cowboys (Big 12 Conference) (1997–2003)
| 1997 | Oklahoma State | 46–19 | 21–9 | 2nd | NCAA Regional |
| 1998 | Oklahoma State | 40–21 | 15–12 | 6th | NCAA Regional |
| 1999 | Oklahoma State | 46–21 | 18–9 | 4th | College World Series |
| 2000 | Oklahoma State | 36–22 | 14–13 | 6th | |
| 2001 | Oklahoma State | 42–22 | 16–14 | 5th | NCAA Regional |
| 2002 | Oklahoma State | 37–21 | 13–13 | 5th | |
| 2003 | Oklahoma State | 34–23 | 14–13 | 6th | |
| Oklahoma State: | | 281–150 | | | |
| Total: | | 281–150 | | | |
National champion Postseason invitational champion Conference regular season champion Conference regular season and conference tournament champion Division regular season champion Division regular season and conference tournament champion Conference tournament champion
