= Artie Smith =

American football player (born 1970)

No. 95, 99, 70, 93
- Position: Defensive end

Personal information
- Born: May 15, 1970 (age 56); Stillwater, Oklahoma, U.S.
- Listed height: 6 ft 5 in (1.96 m)
- Listed weight: 305 lb (138 kg)

Career information
- High school: Stillwater
- College: Louisiana Tech
- NFL draft: 1993: 5th round, 116th overall pick

Career history
- San Francisco 49ers (1993–1994); Cincinnati Bengals (1994–1996); New England Patriots (1998)*; Dallas Cowboys (1998); Kansas City Chiefs (1999)*
- * Offseason or practice squad member only

Awards and highlights
- Super Bowl champion (XXIX); 2× All-South Independent (1991, 1992); All-Louisiana (1992)

Career NFL statistics
- Tackles: 105
- Sacks: 4.5
- Forced fumbles: 2
- Stats at Pro Football Reference

Artie Enlow Smith (born May 15, 1970) is an American former professional football player who was a defensive end in the National Football League (NFL) for the Cincinnati Bengals, San Francisco 49ers, and Dallas Cowboys. He played college football for the Louisiana Tech Bulldogs and was selected by the 49ers in the fifth round of the 1993 NFL draft.

== Early life ==
Smith attended Stillwater High School, where he was a two-time All-state selection at defensive end. He also played tight end and defensive tackle. He was a two-time All-conference selection in basketball.

He accepted a football scholarship from Louisiana Tech University. As a senior, he finished with 81 tackles. He had 12 tackles against the University of Alabama. He had 9 tackles and blocked a field goal against the University of South Carolina.

He also participated in track, where he was the Sun Belt Conference Discus throw champion as a junior in 1992.

== Professional career ==
=== San Francisco 49ers ===
Smith was selected by the San Francisco 49ers in the fifth round (116th overall) of the 1993 NFL draft. As a rookie, he played in 9 games and started in 2 at right defensive end. On September 15, 1994, he was part of the cuts made after 2 games, to make room to sign Deion Sanders and Charles Mann.

=== Cincinnati Bengals ===
On September 16, 1994, Smith was claimed off waivers by the Cincinnati Bengals and played in 7 games as a reserve defensive end. In 1995, he was a starter at right defensive end, right defensive tackle and left defensive tackle, registering 44 tackles and 2 sacks. The next year, he played in 16 games (12 starts), while registering 34 tackles. He was released on August 4, 1997.

=== New England Patriots ===
On March 11, 1998, he signed with the New England Patriots as a free agent after being out of football for a year. He was traded to the Dallas Cowboys in exchange for future considerations on August 25.

=== Dallas Cowboys ===
In 1998, he played a full season with the Dallas Cowboys as a reserve defensive tackle, posting 24 tackles, 7 quarterback pressures and one blocked field goal.

=== Kansas City Chiefs ===
On April 22, 1999, he was signed as a free agent by the Kansas City Chiefs. He was released on September 5.
