= Matt Holliday =

American baseball player (born 1980)

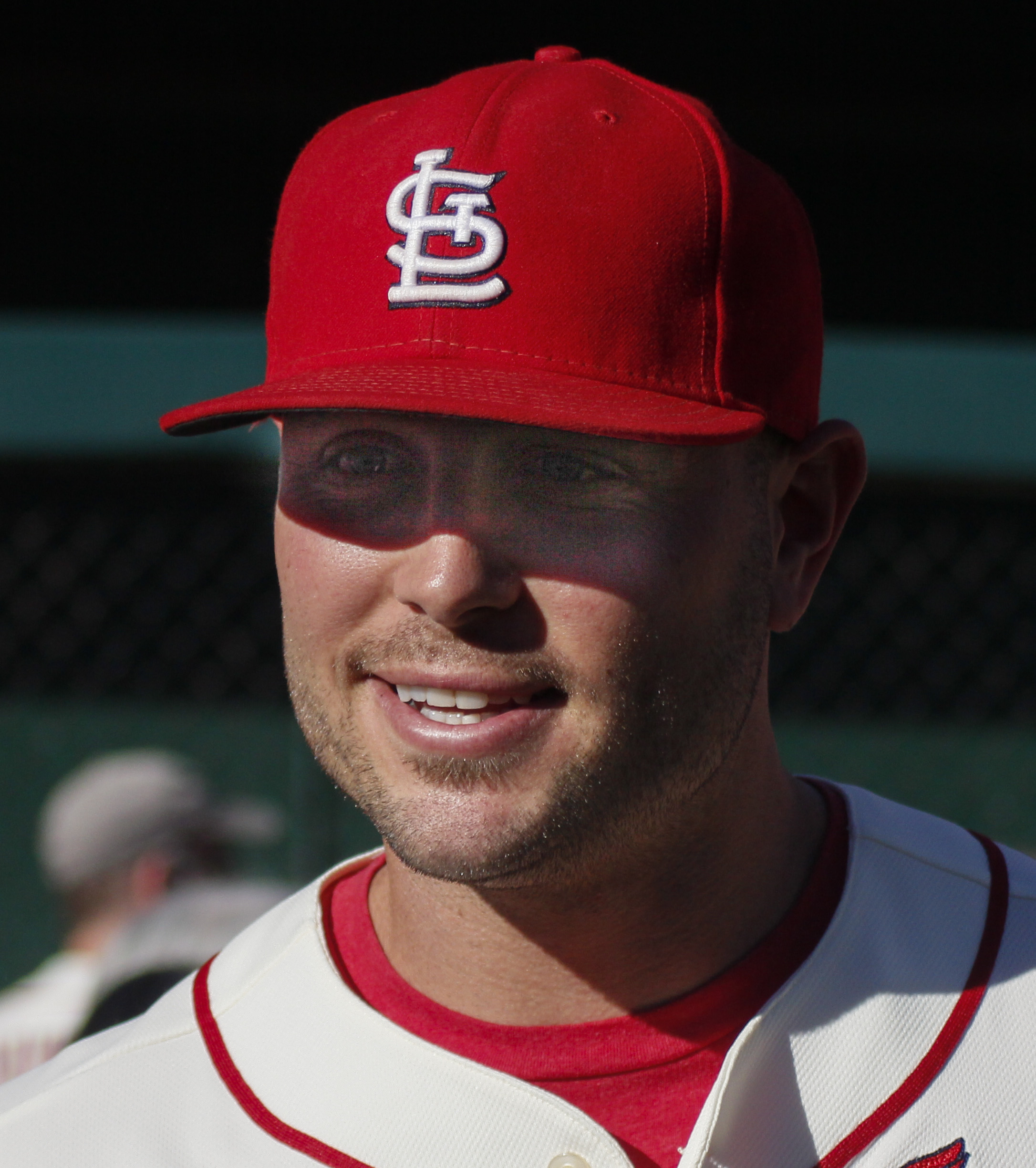
- Holliday with the St. Louis Cardinals in 2013
- Left fielder
- Born: January 15, 1980 (age 46); Stillwater, Oklahoma, U.S.
- Batted: Right Threw: Right

MLB debut
- April 16, 2004, for the Colorado Rockies

Last MLB appearance
- October 1, 2018, for the Colorado Rockies

MLB statistics
- Batting average: .299
- Hits: 2,096
- Home runs: 316
- Runs batted in: 1,220
- Stats at Baseball Reference

Teams
- Colorado Rockies (2004–2008); Oakland Athletics (2009); St. Louis Cardinals (2009–2016); New York Yankees (2017); Colorado Rockies (2018)

Career highlights and awards
- 7× All-Star (2006–2008, 2010–2012, 2015); World Series champion (2011); NLCS MVP (2007); 4× Silver Slugger Award (2006–2008, 2010); NL batting champion (2007); NL RBI leader (2007); St. Louis Cardinals Hall of Fame

Matthew Thomas Holliday (born January 15, 1980) is an American former professional baseball left fielder. He played 15 seasons in Major League Baseball (MLB) for the Colorado Rockies, Oakland Athletics, St. Louis Cardinals, and New York Yankees. A World Series champion in 2011 with the Cardinals, Holliday played a key role in seven postseasons, including the Rockies' first-ever World Series appearance in 2007 and Cardinals' playoff success in the 2010s. His distinctions include a National League (NL) batting championship, the 2007 NL Championship Series Most Valuable Player Award (NLCS MVP), seven All-Star selections, and four Silver Slugger Awards. Other career accomplishments include 300 home runs, more than 2,000 hits, and batting over .300 eight times.

The Colorado Rockies selected Holliday in the seventh round of the 1998 MLB draft from high school in Oklahoma, where he also starred as a highly touted quarterback prospect. He debuted in MLB in 2004, becoming the Rockies' starting left fielder and a middle of the lineup presence. In 2006, he became the 19th player ever to reach 195 hits, 30 home runs, 45 doubles, 115 runs and 110 runs batted in (RBI) in one season. The next season, he won the NL batting title, September National League Player of the Month honors and NLCS MVP as the Rockies won 21 of 22 games at the end of the regular season and in the playoffs en route to their first World Series appearance. In the first of four consecutive NLCS appearances starting in 2011, he batted .435 with a .652 slugging percentage in the 2011 NLCS on his way to winning his first World Series ring with the Cardinals. In 2014, he became just the fifth player in MLB history to amass nine consecutive seasons of at least 20 home runs, 30 doubles, 75 RBI and 80 runs scored each season.

In addition to his presence as a leader on the field, Holliday is active in charity work and assisting his teammates off the field. Thus, the St. Louis chapter of the Baseball Writers' Association of America has awarded him the Darryl Kile Good Guy Award. He is a frequent visitor to children's hospitals. From 2012 to 2016, Holliday co-sponsored a pledge drive for Greater St. Louis hospitals called "Homers for Health", which raised more than $3.7 million. Since retirement, he remains active with Homers for Health as chairman.

Because of his hitting abilities and strength, he has sometimes been called the "Stillwater Stinger". His son, Jackson, was selected first overall in the 2022 MLB draft. His son, Ethan, was selected fourth overall in the 2025 MLB draft, by the same team that drafted him, the Rockies.

== Early life ==
Matt Holliday was born and raised in Stillwater, Oklahoma. With easy athletic skill, he showed marked talent in baseball, football and basketball as a youth. He was also physically larger than most of his friends, so when they played games, they often modified the rules to offset his size advantage. In football, Holliday was required to play quarterback for both teams. In baseball, every three of his home runs were credited as one.

He spent much of his free time with his father, Tom Holliday, and brother, Josh, at the Oklahoma State University (OSU) baseball field and training complex, where his father was a coach. There, the Holliday boys learned about the fundamentals of the sport, voluntarily trained and practiced, and watched future major leaguers such as Robin Ventura play and develop. In addition, he played American Legion Baseball during the summer. In spite of the extensive time spent around the sport of baseball, Tom Holliday abstained from attempting to influence his sons on which sport or sports to concentrate.

At Stillwater High School, Holliday played both baseball and football. He was a quarterback while playing football. As a senior, he earned All-American honors in football and baseball and also earned his region's Gatorade Player of the Year award in both sports. He also competed for the 1997 USA Junior National Team. In his next-to-last football game for Stillwater, he helped bring the Pioneers back from a 42–21 deficit against Tulsa Union by throwing three touchdowns (TD) in the final six minutes of the game for a 43–42 score.

However, his high school football career ended with a 63–0 loss to Jenks in the state semifinal contest. His career passing totals included 6,211 yards and 68 TD. His 35 TD passes as a junior set a then-11 man state record. Former Dallas Cowboys head coach Jimmy Johnson reportedly once forecasted to Tom Holliday that his son "couldn't miss" as an NFL prospect. He was also rated the third-best quarterback prospect in the nation after graduating from Stillwater in 1998.

Numerous connections throughout college and professional baseball span Holliday's family ties. His father, Tom Holliday, has been the pitching coach for the Tigers of Auburn University, and former baseball head coach of OSU. Current Atlanta Braves MLB scout, Dave Holliday, is an uncle. His older brother, Josh, is currently the head baseball coach at OSU, and a former minor league player in the Toronto Blue Jays organization. A cousin, Heath Holliday, has also played baseball as a catcher for OSU.

== Professional career ==
=== Draft and minor leagues (1998–2004) ===
With football recruiting overtures from colleges and universities all over the country—including OSU—Holliday instead chose professional baseball after graduating from high school. The Rockies selected him in the seventh round of the 1998 Major League Baseball draft as a third baseman. Widespread concerns that he would choose football over baseball prevented him from being drafted earlier since he had already committed to OSU on paper to play football. Thus, Rockies scouting director Pat Daugherty signed him for an above-slot $840,000, the most money paid to any player in that round.

In Holliday's inaugural professional season, the Rockies assigned him to their Arizona League affiliate, who finished with a 42–14 record and won the league championship. He played 32 games and assembled 40 hits in 117 at bats for a .342 batting average, collected four doubles, a triple, five home runs and 23 runs batted in (RBI); his home run total placed third in the league. He played 1999 for the Asheville Tourists, batting .264 with 16 home runs and 76 runs scored. With the bases loaded, he was 3-for-9 with one grand slam and 11 RBI. At third base, Holliday turned in an .871 fielding percentage and 57 putouts.

Holliday played for Salem in 2000 and 2001. For the 2000 season, he totaled 510 plate appearances, successfully collected 126 hits, 28 doubles, two triples, seven home runs, drove in 72 runs, and batted .274 with a .335 on-base percentage and .389 slugging percentage. He spent 112 games at third base, was charged with 32 errors in 300 total chances for a fielding percentage of .893, and turned 13 double plays. In 2001, the Rockies moved Holliday to the outfield. He was named the Carolina League Player of the Month for June, batting .324 with seven multi-hit games, three doubles, seven home runs, and 22 RBI. He played 72 games on the season after undergoing elbow surgery in July ended his season.

The Rockies promoted Holliday to the Carolina Mudcats of the AA Southern League (SL) in 2002, where he was named a mid-season All-Star. He was named the league's Hitter of the Week on June 27, after collecting nine hits in 24 at-bats, with one home run and eight RBI. He won the same award on July 18, after scoring seven runs and driving in 10, and a career-best six RBI against Birmingham on July 14. Holliday ended the season with 128 hits in 463 at-bats, 10 home runs, and 64 RBI, batting .276 with 79 runs scored and 16 stolen bases. He played for the Mesa Solar Sox of the off-season Arizona Fall League (AFL) in 2002 and 2003, batting .316 with four home runs, 21 RBI and 10 stolen bases in 35 total AFL games. Holliday remained at the AA level for the 2003 season as the everyday left fielder for the Tulsa Drillers of the Texas League, batting .253, 28 doubles, 72 RBI, 132 hits, 45 extra-base hits, and 206 total bases. His 15 outfield assists tied for second in the league. He earned a spot on the USA Baseball team in the Olympic Qualifying Tournament in Panama. They were eliminated from advancing to the 2004 Summer Olympics.

=== Colorado Rockies (2004–08) ===
==== 2004–06: Beginning career ====
The Rockies assigned Holliday to their Triple-A affiliate, the Colorado Springs Sky Sox, at the outset of the 2004 season, intending for him to spend much of the season there. Injuries to outfielders Preston Wilson and Larry Walker expedited his progress to the Major Leagues after just six games with Colorado Springs. He made his major league debut in left field on April 16 at Busch Memorial Stadium against one of his future teams, the St. Louis Cardinals. Holliday went hitless in three at-bats. Two days after his debut, Holliday recorded his first career hit, a single, and then, RBI against the Cardinals' Woody Williams, doubling in Kit Pellow. Holliday's first career home run came against José Lima of the Los Angeles Dodgers on April 22. Five days later, he, Jeromy Burnitz, and Charles Johnson collaborated for back-to-back-to-back home runs against the Florida Marlins, the sixth such occasion in franchise history.

Holliday's first career multi-home run game came against the Cincinnati Reds on May 18. Both home runs came as part of back-to-back home runs events with Burnitz, making them the first teammates in franchise history to hit back-to-back home runs twice in the same game, and the first teammate duo to do so since Mike Cameron and Bret Boone of the Seattle Mariners in 2002. His first MLB grand slam came against the Tampa Bay Devil Rays on June 12, immediately tying a game in which the Rockies had faced a 5–1 deficit. For the month of June, he hit .357. The Rockies traded Walker to the Cardinals in August, clearing more outfield playing opportunities for Holliday. A sprained elbow while diving for a ball against the San Diego Padres on September 12 ended his season. His final batting line included a .290 batting average in 121 games, with 31 doubles, 14 home runs, 57 RBI, 65 runs scored, 48 extra-base hits, .349 on-base percentage, .488 slugging percentage, and 195 total bases. He finished in the top five among NL rookies in each of those categories. After the season, Holliday was named to both Baseball America's All-Rookie Team and Topps' Major League Rookie All-Star Team, and finished fifth in the Rookie of the Year balloting.

In his second major league season, Holliday became the cleanup hitter behind franchise icon Todd Helton in the middle of the 2005 season. After 119 at bats into the season, Holliday hit his first home run against Noah Lowry of the San Francisco Giants on May 17. He hit his second career multi-homer game and first with three extra base hits against the Cardinals on June 2. He was placed on the disabled list (DL) with a right fractured pinky and returned to play on July 18. He earned his first NL Player of the Week award for July 25 to 31, after batting .444 with three home runs, eight RBI, an .852 slugging percentage and a league-leading 12 hits and 23 total bases.

In September, Holliday led the NL with 32 RBI, setting a Rockies record for that month. On September 20 against the Padres, he hit two home runs and tied a Rockies' single-game record with eight RBI in a Rockies 20–1 victory, the highest single-game RBI total in the NL in 2005 and second-highest in the major leagues. He ended the season with a seven-game hitting streak and reached base in each of the Rockies' final 22 games. Holliday totaled 125 games and improved in nearly all offensive categories from his rookie year, including 147 hits, 19 home runs, 87 RBI, 68 runs, 14 stolen bases, 242 total bases, 505 slugging percentage and .361 on-base percentage. His .307 batting average placed eighth in the NL. The club picked up his option for 2006, which was worth $500,000 ($824,246 today), or about $100,000 ($164,849.2 today) more than the average for a player with equivalent service time. He was selected as the Rockies Player of the Year.

Holliday was selected to Team USA for the 2006 World Baseball Classic prior to the start of the MLB season. Despite batting just .255 through May 1, 2006, Holliday accumulated 24 RBI in 25 games. From May 1 until the end of the season – a span of 131 games – he collected 169 hits for a .339 batting average, the fourth-highest in the major leagues. He batted .404 from June 1–27, second in the NL in that period. An All-Star selection to the game at PNC Park in Pittsburgh for the first time in his career, Holliday was hitting .339 with 16 home runs and 56 RBI at the time of his selection. In the game, Holliday played right field for the first time as a major leaguer.

On September 19, 2006, Holliday hit the longest home run of 2006 in MLB against Matt Cain of the Giants. While the official distance was 443 feet (135 m), HitTracker estimated it at 496 feet (151 m). His grand slam and triple five days later against the Braves assisted the Rockies' comeback from a 7–0 deficit to a 9–8 final victory. He garnered his second NL Player of the Week for the week ending September 24, after hitting four homers, three doubles and a triple, helping propel the Rockies to win five of seven games. In 155 total games, Holliday batted .326 with 196 hits, 45 doubles, 34 home runs, 114 RBIs, 119 runs, 10 stolen bases, 353 total bases, .586 slugging percentage, and .387 on-base percentage. He became just the 19th player ever to meet or exceed 195 hits, 30 home runs, 45 doubles, 115 runs and 110 RBI in one season. He finished in the top five of the National League in batting average, hits, runs, extra base hits, total bases and slugging percentage. After the season, received his first Silver Slugger Award as an outfielder.

==== 2007: Batting title winner and NLCS MVP ====
Continuing to evolve as a hitter, Holliday started the 2007 season as in the Rockies' lineup as the number five hitter, but changed to the third slot for the final five months of the season. He fashioned a new career-high 14-game hitting streak that spanned from April 17 to May 1. His two outfield assists on April 21 against San Diego in the sixth inning tied a club record for outfield assists in one inning. In the April 29 contest against the Braves, Holliday hit his first career walk-off home run in the bottom of the 11th off Bob Wickman to provide a 9–7 victory. From May 22 to June 7, he established a new career-high 15 game hitting streak. In 87 first half games, Holliday totaled 30 doubles, 15 home runs, 69 RBI, 122 hits, a .341 average, and a .573 slugging percentage. NL players and coaches selected him in with 725 votes to play in the All-Star Game at AT&T Park in San Francisco for the second straight season. He also participated in the Home Run Derby.

Holliday hit .361 (86-for-238) in the final 60 games of the season. For the week ending July 29, he earned National League Player of the Week honors as the Rockies won four of the six games, batting .364 with a .481 on-base percentage and four home runs, two doubles, and 10 RBI. From August 10 to 27, he strung together another new career-best 17-game hitting streak. In reaching base safely each game from July 22 to August 31 against the Diamondbacks, Holliday's feat of 36 consecutive games eclipsed a Rockies record which Helton and Walker previously shared, eventually ending at 38.

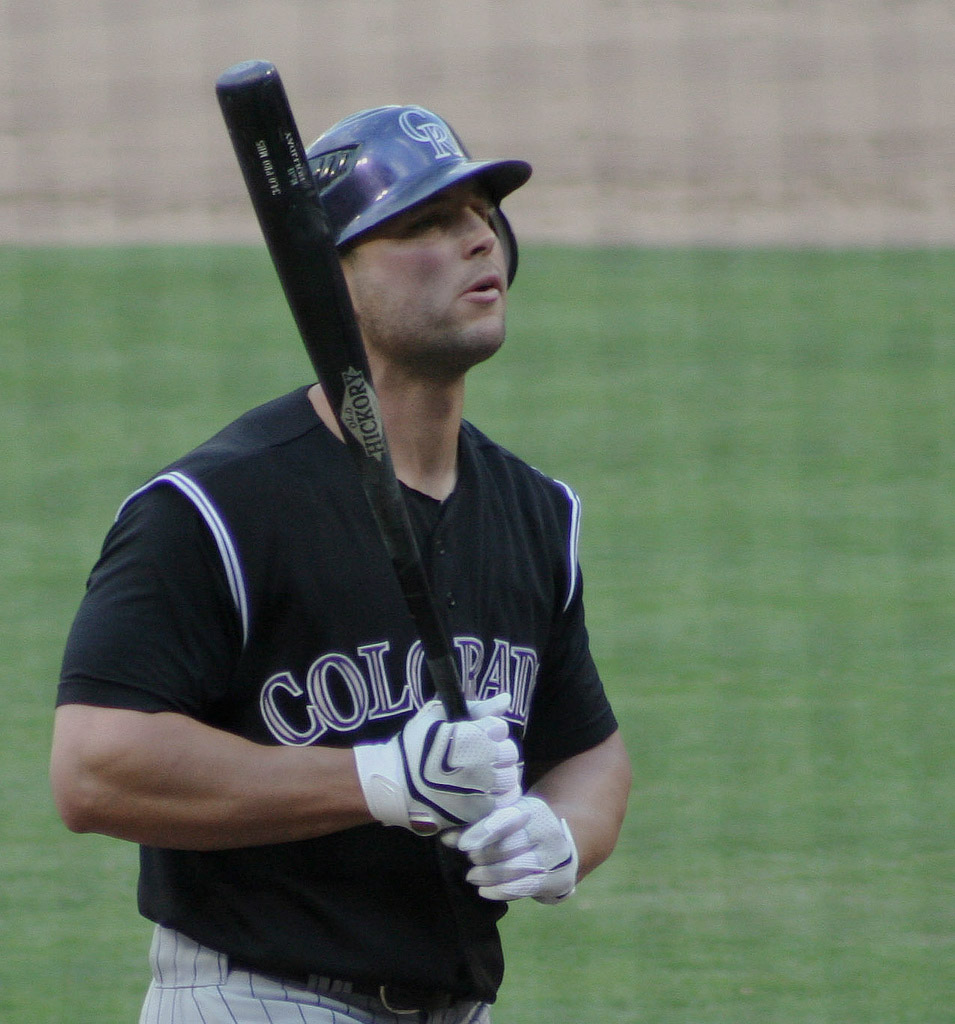
Holliday on the field in 2007

Holliday gained his second NL Player of the Week selection of the season and fourth of his career on September 16, after hitting six home runs, driving in 11, batting .407 with a .500 on-base percentage, and leading the NL each with a 1.148 slugging percentage, 11 runs scored, and 31 total bases. In a 12-game span from September 9–20, he hit 11 home runs; only Alex Rodríguez matched that feat in 2007. One of the home runs was the 100th of his career and his 200th hit of the season, occurring on September 19 in a 9–8 victory over the Dodgers. His September totals included a .367 batting average, 29 runs scored, six doubles, 12 home runs, 30 RBI, and .796 slugging percentage, prompting MLB to award him NL Player of the Month honors as the Rockies won 13 of their 14 final scheduled games. He garnered copious attention for the Most Valuable Player (MVP) award throughout the season, which increased even more that September.

The Rockies and Padres finished the scheduled portion of their regular seasons tied for the NL wild card position with identical 89–73 records, for which MLB declared a one-game extension to the regular season to determine the wild-card winner. Holliday's triple in the bottom of the 13th inning off Padres closer Trevor Hoffman scored Troy Tulowitzki as the tying run. Holliday scored the winning run on Jamey Carroll's sacrifice fly in a bloody collision with catcher Michael Barrett, although controversy arose as to whether he touched home plate. Thus, the Rockies entered the playoffs for the first time in Holliday's career.

After hitting a career-best .340, Holliday won his first batting title. He played in 158 games and posted career-highs as the National League leader in hits (216), doubles (50), RBI (137), extra base hits (92), and total bases (386). Additionally, he placed third in each of runs scored (120), slugging percentage (.607) and OPS (1.012), and fourth in home runs (36) and adjusted OPS+ (150). The 63 walks were a new career-high at the time. He became just the fifth National Leaguer in the previous 59 years to lead the NL in both batting average and RBI, and only the 13th major league player in the previous 45 years with at least 200 hits and 50 doubles.

In the National League Division Series (NLDS) against the Phillies, Holliday homered twice as the Rockies swept. Colorado then advanced to the National League Championship Series (NLCS) to face the Diamondbacks and swept them in four games. Holliday batted .333 with two home runs and four RBI on his way to being named the NLCS MVP. Now having won 21 of 22 games, the Rockies earned their first-ever trip to the World Series where they opposed the Boston Red Sox. Holliday collected four hits in Game 2, but, after his fourth hit in the eighth inning with the Red Sox leading 2–1, closer Jonathan Papelbon immediately picked him off first base for the third out, and the Red Sox won by that same score. Boston eventually won the title by sweeping the Rockies, thus ending their season on a four-game losing streak.

Following the season, Holliday placed second in the MVP voting with 336 points to Phillies shortstop Jimmy Rollins with 363, in what was the closest result for the NL MVP since Atlanta Braves third baseman Terry Pendleton edged Pittsburgh Pirates left fielder Barry Bonds by 15 points in 1991. Holliday was selected as the Rockies' Player of the Year for the second time and The Sporting News named him to their All-Star team. On December 14, Stillwater High School retired Holliday's high school jersey number 24. Businesses in Stillwater were asked to honor him that day by posting a "Welcome Home Matt Holliday" message on a marquee or window. The city council voted to change the name of the baseball field from Babcock Park to Matt Holliday Field and name the day "Matt Holliday, Stillwater's Major League Baseball Hero Day". Then-Oklahoma Governor Brad Henry also declared the day "Matt Holliday Day" throughout the state.

==== 2008 ====
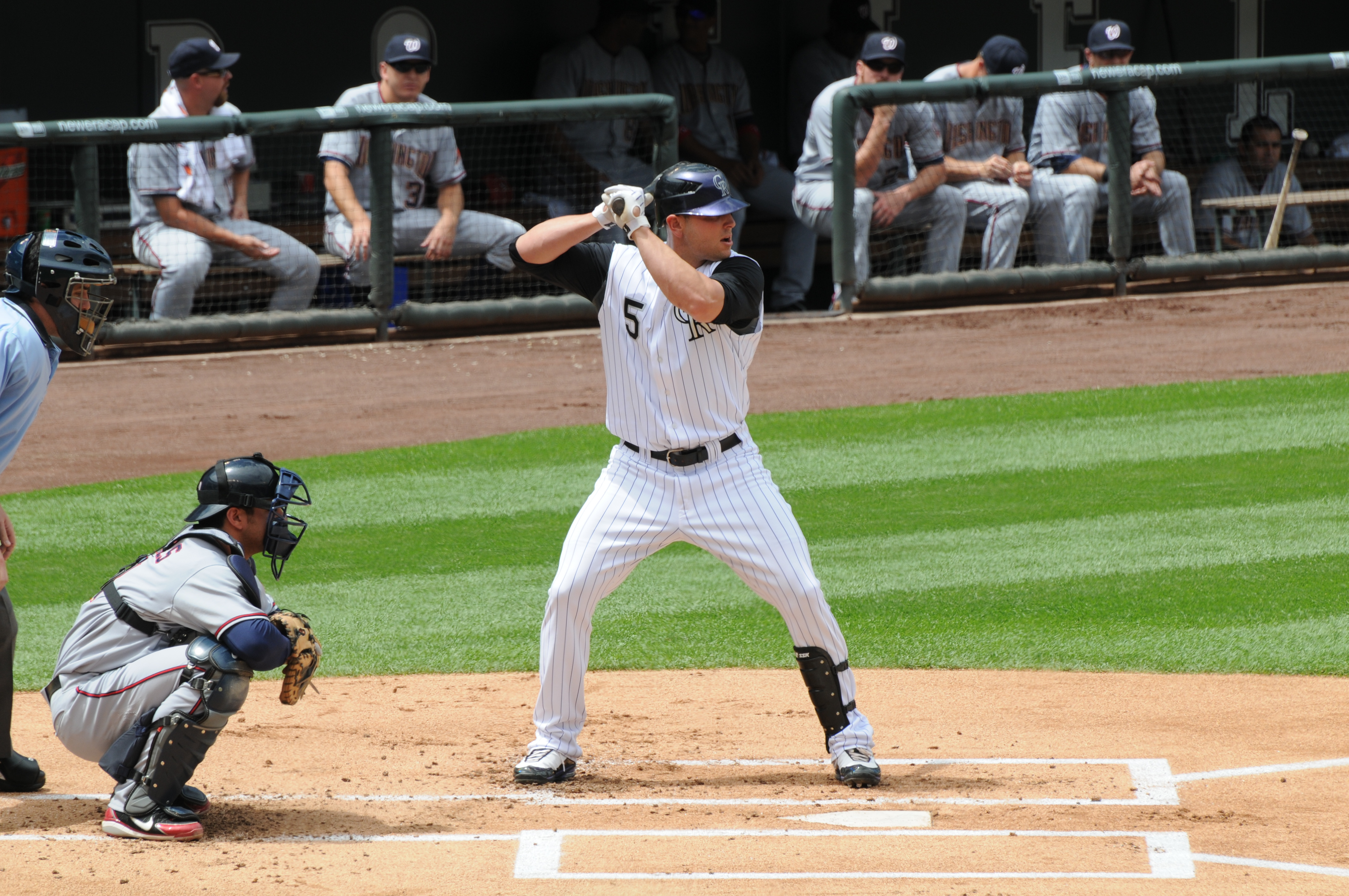
batting for the Colorado Rockies in 2008

On January 18, 2008, Holliday signed a two-year, $23 million contract with the Rockies, covering his final two years of arbitration. The Rockies also offered a four-year, $72 million extension, with a club option for a fifth year at $12 million. The team viewed the contract extension with the two years covering arbitration as a singular deal worth approximately $107 million. In contrast, Holliday and his agent, Scott Boras, regarded the extension as an $84-million free agent contract undervalued compared to similar players. Therefore, negotiations stalled in spring training.

Holliday collected three hits and hit the go-ahead home run in the eighth inning against the Braves on April 7, giving the Rockies a 2–1 win. In a three-game sweep of Atlanta, he hit .462 (6-for-13), with a double, triple and home run, and six RBI. He earned the NL Player of the Week award for the period ending April 13 as the Rockies won four of six. Holliday led the NL with a .480 batting average and 10 RBI, while homering twice with an .880 slugging percentage and .519 on-base percentage. He hit the game-tying home run against New York Mets closer Billy Wagner in the bottom of the ninth inning on May 23, then the game-winning single off Aaron Heilman in the bottom of the 13th to drive in Jonathan Herrera. Two days later, the Rockies placed Holliday on the 15-day DL due to a strained left hamstring, and reactivated him on June 10.

The Rockies posted the largest comeback in team history in a nine-run deficit on July 4 against the Florida Marlins. After the Marlins led 13–4, Holliday provided two home runs, including a grand slam to reduce the Marlins' lead to 17–16 in an eventual 18–17 win. On July 6, Holliday was named a reserve outfielder for National League in the All-Star Game for the third consecutive year. He replaced Chicago Cubs outfielder Alfonso Soriano, who did not play due to injury, as the starter in right field, and hit a solo home run in the top of the fifth inning. For the month of July, he batted .370 with eight home runs and 24 RBI, .660 slugging percentage and 24 runs scored in 27 games. Holliday's August totals included 11 stolen bases and 30 runs scored in 28 games, six home runs, nine doubles and a .392 on-base percentage.

In 139 total games, he batted .321 with 173 hits, 25 home runs, 88 RBI, 107 runs, and 290 total bases. He led the club with 28 stolen bases while posting a .409 on-base percentage, both career highs, and won his third consecutive Silver Slugger Award. Defensively, Holliday was first in ultimate zone rating (.900), fourth in fielding percentage (.991), fifth in total chances (252) and fifth in putouts (240) among all MLB left fielders. His total chances and putouts came in approximately 100 fewer innings than those players ahead of him.

=== Oakland Athletics (2009) ===
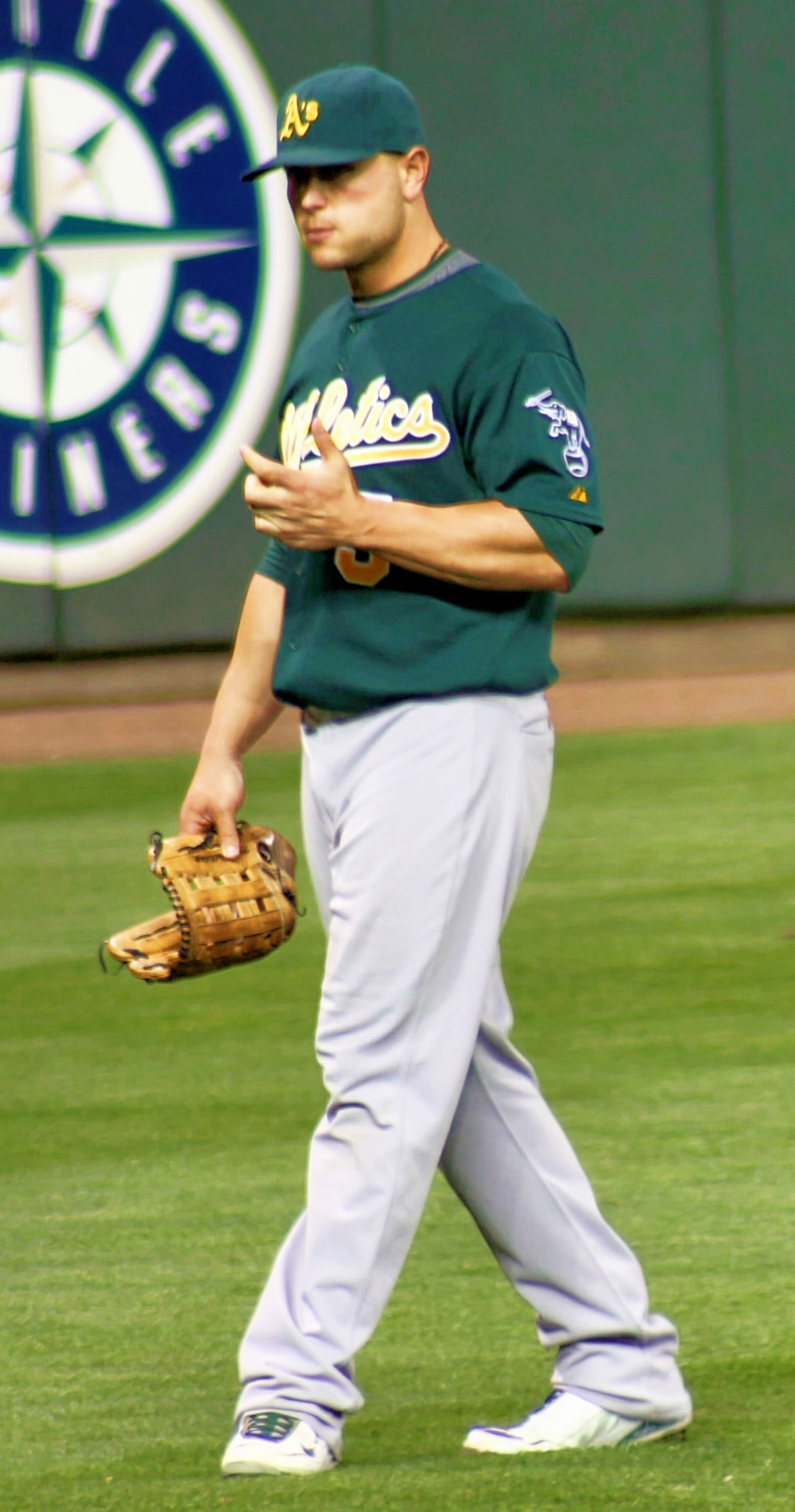
Holliday with the Oakland Athletics in 2009.

Unable to agree to an extension, the Rockies traded Holliday on November 12, 2008, to the Oakland Athletics for pitchers Huston Street and Greg Smith, and outfielder Carlos González. Holliday began working with former A's and Cardinals first baseman Mark McGwire as a personal hitting coach during the 2008–09 off-season, prior to McGwire becoming the Cardinals' official hitting coach the following off-season.

After spending most of the off-season on the trade market with the Rockies, Holliday was again a frequent subject of rumors during the spring. The Athletics failed to get off to a strong start and it was unlikely the club would have been able to re-sign him over the course of the season or if he would have had become a free agent following the season. He also got off a slow start as minor injuries hampered him while playing in Oakland. His first home run of the season came on the last day of April against the Texas Rangers. He batted .240 in April, and, from May 11 until the St. Louis Cardinals acquired him, improved to .316, .420 on-base percentage and .489 slugging percentage over 65 games. Reaching base five times in a May 17 loss to the Detroit Tigers at Comerica Park, he scored his first four-hit game and stolen base of the season.

The A's defeated the Minnesota Twins 14–13 on July 20 following a 10-run comeback, the largest in team history. Holliday contributed two home runs and six RBI, including a seventh-inning grand slam that tied the score at 13. This game marked the second time in his career in which he hit a grand slam plus another home run in his team's record-breaking comeback. The first such comeback had occurred with the Rockies the previous year, on July 4, against the Marlins. Two days later, he added three more hits and three runs scored against the Twins in a 16–1 victory. An offensive surge that boosted his trade value significantly by hitting .390 with a .422 on-base percentage and a .756 slugging percentage in his final two weeks in Oakland. His overall totals with the club included 93 games played while batting .286 with 11 home runs and 54 RBI.

=== St. Louis Cardinals (2009–2016) ===
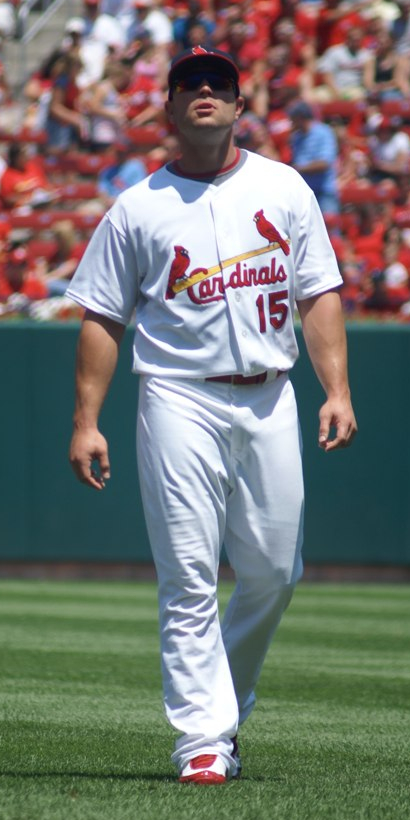
Holliday with the St. Louis Cardinals in 2009

==== 2009–10: Second playoff push and new contract ====
On July 24, 2009, the A's traded Holliday to the St. Louis Cardinals for prospects Brett Wallace, Clayton Mortensen and Shane Peterson and $1.5 million. He represented an instant offensive upgrade for the Cardinals in left field, where players had batted .212 with a .294 on-base percentage and a .342 slugging percentage in 2009. He hit in the fourth slot in the lineup behind All-Star first baseman Albert Pujols. Because Pujols already wore jersey number 5, the number Holliday wore with Colorado and Oakland, St. Louis issued Holliday the number 15.

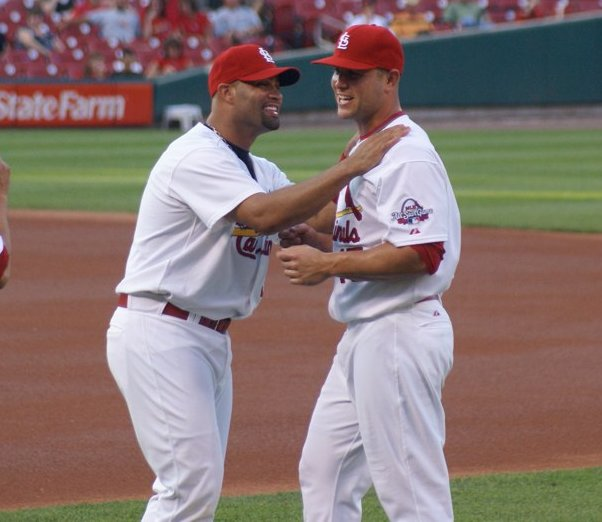
Albert Pujols (left) congratulating Holliday

In his Cardinals debut, Holliday had four hits, an RBI and a stolen base in an 8–1 win, for his 15th career four-hit game. He had 20 hits in 33 at bats in his next nine games for a .606 batting average, .659 on-base percentage and 1.061 slugging percentage, with six doubles, three homers and 10 RBI. His combined totals in 26 games with Oakland and St. Louis in July included 40 hits, 20 runs scored, a .412 batting average, a .487 on-base percentage, a .612 slugging percentage, 13 doubles, four home runs, 22 RBI, 16 walks and four stolen bases. The Cardinals had a 20–6 record in August to stretch a National League Central division lead from a half-game on August 1 to ten on September 1. In the third inning against the Milwaukee Brewers on September 3, Holliday collected his 1,000th MLB hit.

The Cardinals won the National League Central division crown to claim a playoff berth for the first time in three years. During the 65 games with Holliday on the roster, they had an NL-best .600 winning percentage; he batted .353 with 13 home runs and 55 RBI; twelve were game-winning RBI. After the All-Star break, he ranked in the top ten in MLB in batting average (.357), home runs (16), and RBI (66). His aggregate totals with the A's and Cardinals included a .313 batting average, 24 home runs and 109 RBI.

In spite of the inspired play after acquiring Holliday, the Cardinals did not fare well in the postseason, where they battled the Dodgers in the NLDS. Following a Game 1 defeat, Holliday hit a go-ahead home run off starter Clayton Kershaw in Game 2. With the Cardinals maintaining a 2–1 advantage and two outs in the ninth inning, Holliday dropped a line drive off James Loney's bat. Had he caught the ball, that play would have ended the contest for a Cardinals win and a 1–1 Series tie. Instead, Loney ended up on second base, setting the Dodgers up to eventually score the game-winning run for a 3–2 final margin. Los Angeles swept the best-of-five series, ending the Cardinals' season, and the Game 2 error left Holliday with a reputation as a "goat".

Holliday filed for free agency on November 5. He finished 16th in the NL MVP voting—including a fourth-place vote—despite playing nearly 100 games in the American League. Both trades involving Holliday were later panned as failures for the A's, as two of the players they dealt away became multiple All-Stars. One was González, who won the 2010 batting title, Silver Slugger and Gold Glove Awards with the Rockies. Street was the other All-Star. Jesse Spector of Sporting News augured that the second deal was a "landslide win" for the Cardinals, even if they had never resigned Holliday in his free agency.

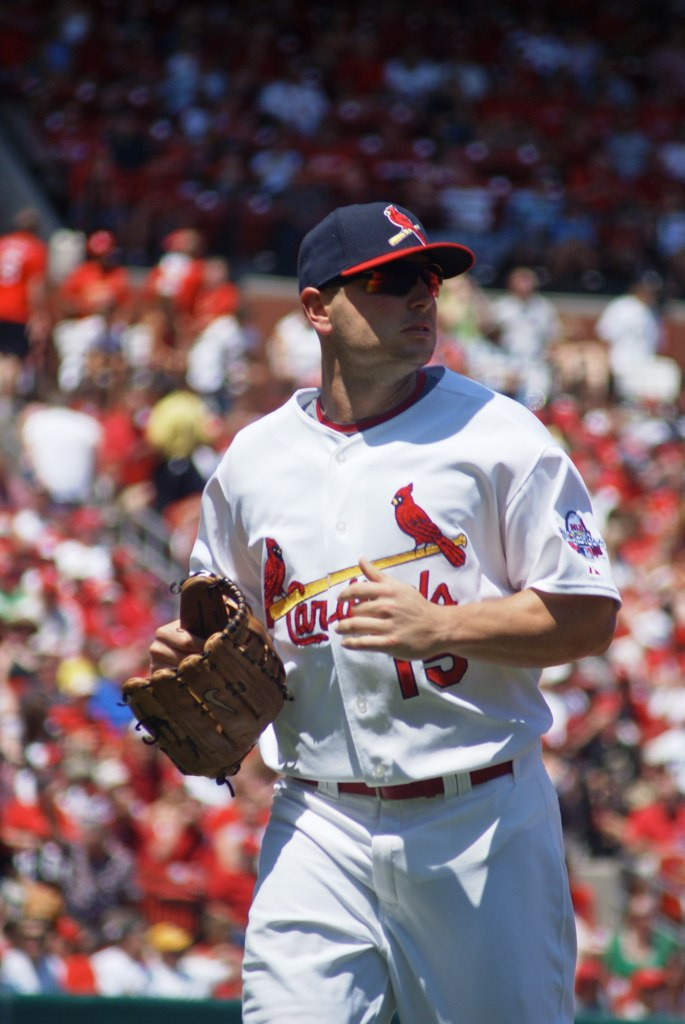
Holliday on the field in 2009

On January 21, 2010, the Cardinals signed Holliday to a seven-year, $120 million deal ($177.2 million today), and he switched his uniform number to 7 in honor of fellow Oklahoman Mickey Mantle. The contract features a full no-trade clause and a $17 million team option for 2017 or $1 million buyout. It was the richest contract in team history and the largest of the 2009–10 offseason. At the Cardinals' annual Winter Warm Up, he was bestowed with a new nickname—"The Stillwater Stinger".

Batting second, Holliday homered in four consecutive games from June 18 to 22. In a weekend series against Oakland from June 18 to 20, he drove in eight of the Cardinals' 12 runs. He was named the National League Player of the Week for June 20, batting .435 with four home runs and eight RBI. Selected to the All-Star Game on July 4 as a reserve player, he also participated in the Home Run Derby. In the 10 games against both his former clubs, he batted .487, seven home runs, 13 RBI and nine runs scored. He batted .431 in a 16-game hitting streak from September 9–24. His .364 average for September and October ranked second in the NL.

For the season, Holliday played in 158 games, batting .312 with 186 hits, 45 doubles, 28 home runs, 103 RBI, 95 runs scored, 69 walks, a .390 on-base percentage and .532 slugging percentage. He finished tied for second in the National League in doubles, third in hits, fourth with 317 total bases and 52 multi-hit games, fifth in batting average, sixth in on-base percentage and extra base hits with 74, and seventh in slugging and RBI. He earned another Silver Slugger award, was named to The Sporting News All-Star Team and placed 12th in the NL MVP voting. The St. Louis chapter of the Baseball Writers' Association of America recognized his charitable work and role as a team leader with the Darryl Kile Good Guy Award.

==== 2011–13: World Series championship, three consecutive NLCS appearances ====
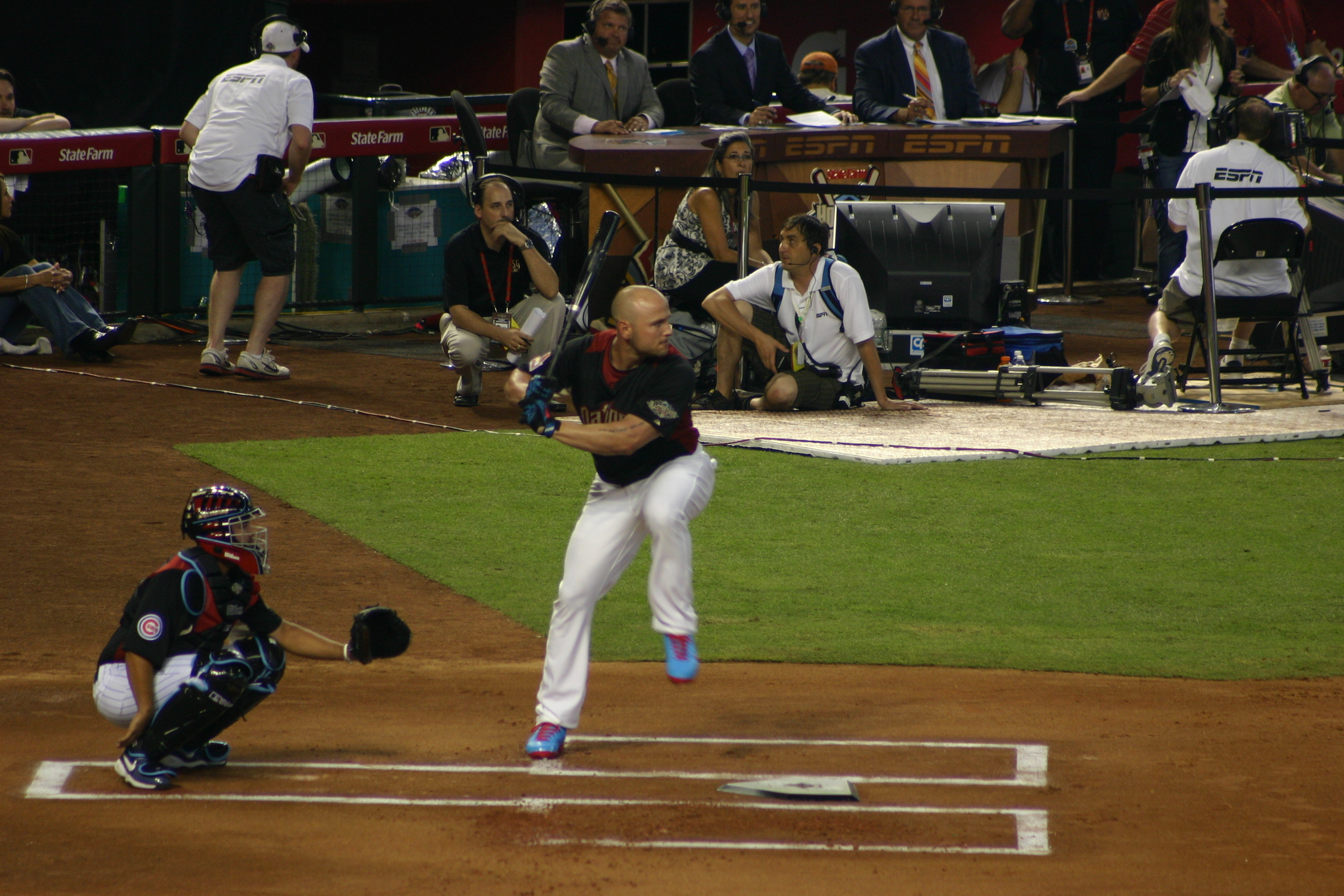
Holliday during the 2011 Home Run Derby

After hitting a home run on Opening Day of 2011, Holliday had an emergency appendectomy. He returned just nine days later, despite a forecast to miss four to six weeks. In seven consecutive plate appearances against the Houston Astros on April 26 and 27, he reached base and did so in 10 of 15 plate appearances in that series. He made his fifth MLB All-Star Game appearance and third Home Run Derby. After two appearances on the disabled list twice that season, a different "injury bug" struck Holliday in a late August game against the Dodgers. During the eighth inning, he left the game due to pain developing after a moth had lodged itself deep within his ear. Team trainers removed it without further incident.

As of August 28, the Cardinals were 10 1/2 games behind the Braves for the wild card playoff berth with 28 left to play. In a September 1 contest against the Brewers, Holliday hit his 200th career home run, becoming the 300th player in MLB history to do so. Tendonitis developed in his right hand on September 13, limiting him to three more starts the rest of the season. St. Louis won 20 of their final 28 games, enabling them to overtake the Braves for the wild card position in the last game of the regular season; it was the largest lead surrendered in MLB history with 28 games left to play. In 124 games, Holliday batted .296 with 22 home runs, 75 RBI, 36 doubles, .388 on-base percentage, .525 slugging percentage, .912 OPS, and 151 OPS+, placing sixth in the NL in on-base percentage, seventh in OPS and OPS+ and ninth in doubles.

In the NLDS against the Phillies, Holliday's tendonitis reemerged, limiting him to start two of the five games in the series. He was in better health for the NLCS against Milwaukee, batting .435 with 10 hits, six runs scored, five RBI and a home run. The Cardinals defeated the Brewers, advancing to the World Series against the Texas Rangers. Holliday was injured again in Game 6 on a play diving into third base where catcher Mike Napoli and third baseman Adrián Beltré had picked him off, and the injury also kept him out of Game 7. The Cardinals won again and the Series, giving him his first World Series ring. Although he had just three hits in 19 at-bats, Holliday walked seven times—the most since Bonds' 13 in the 2002 World Series—boosting his on-base percentage to .385 as he scored five runs.

In 41 straight starts spanning from June 22 to August 8, 2012, Holliday reached base. His 15-game hitting streak from June 27 to July 16 was a season-high for the club. From June 16 to July 6, he batted .500 with 10 doubles, 17 runs scored, four home runs, and 21 RBI; his batting average, on-base percentage (.549) and slugging percentage (.824) each led MLB. Holliday was named the NL All-Star team to replace teammate Yadier Molina when he went on the bereavement list. On July 21, Holliday hit the longest home run recorded to date at Busch Stadium. The ball traveled 469 feet (143 m), flying past the "Big Mac Land" sign into the second deck in left field. He held the record until Brandon Moss surpassed that distance four years later. Safely hitting four times in five at-bats on August 26 against Cincinnati, he also had four RBI and missed hitting for the cycle by a home run. He singled in the first inning against the Nationals on August 30 for his 1,500th career hit. Holliday finished the season with a .295 batting average with 27 home runs and 102 RBI.

During the NLCS against the Giants in Game 2, he slid into second baseman Marco Scutaro during a routine ground ball double play and ended up on top of him. Scutaro left the game to have x-rays taken. Controversy arose and persisted as to whether Holliday intentionally attempted to injure him. The Giants trailed 1–0 at that point, but scored seven runs to win, 7–1. Eventually, the Giants won the series. The Missouri Athletic Club named Holliday their Sports Personality of the Year for 2012.

Holliday hit a grand slam on June 9, 2013, during a seven-run 10th inning against the Reds in an 11–4 victory. He left the July 11 game against the Cubs early because of a tightened right hamstring sustained while running to first base, prompting the Cardinals to place him on the DL. He returned July 27 against the Braves. In another game against the Reds on August 26, Holliday's three-run home run was the longest at Busch Stadium in 2013 at 442 feet (135 m). During the final road trip of the season, he collected 13 hits in 26 at bats. However, back spasms kept him out of several games at the end of the regular season. The Cardinals set an all-time MLB team record by batting .330 with runners in scoring position, and Holliday was fourth in MLB in those situations that year at .390. In all, he finished with 22 home runs, 94 RBI, and a .300 batting average. His MLB-leading 31 double plays grounded into were a career-high and set a new Cardinals' single-season franchise record.

The Cardinals clinched the best record in the NL at 97–65, granting Holliday his fifth career postseason entrance, and fourth with the Cardinals. Faced with a must-win Game 4 situation against the Pirates in the NLDS, he hit a two-run home run in a 2–1 victory. The Cardinals advanced to their third consecutive NLCS against the Dodgers. Holliday started 0-for-13, but his Game 3 home run off Ricky Nolasco to help St. Louis win, 4–2. The Cardinals defeated the Dodgers in six games, securing Holliday's third trip to the Fall Classic, and second against the Red Sox. Holliday collected six hits in 24 at bats with one double, one triple and two home runs for a .625 slugging percentage; however, the Red Sox claimed the title in six games. In the 2013 postseason, Holliday hit four home runs, 10 RBI and a .507 slugging percentage.

==== 2014: Fifth NLCS, 400th double and 1,000th career RBI and run scored ====
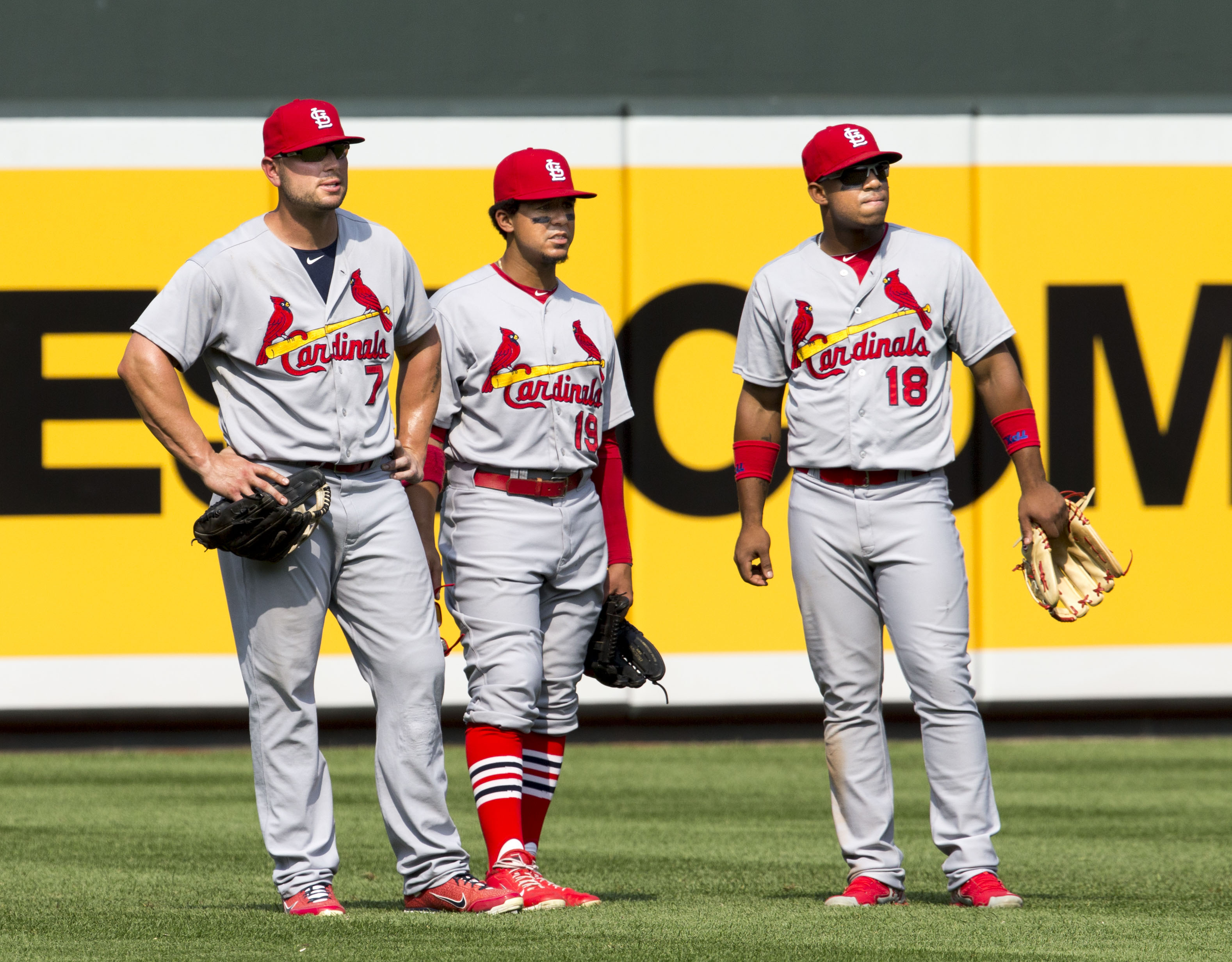
Holliday with Jon Jay and Oscar Taveras at Oriole Park at Camden Yards in 2014

By reaching base in each of his first 30 home games of 2014, Holliday authored the longest such streak to start a season in franchise history since Solly Hemus had 33 straight in 1953, extending a streak of 42 dating back to the previous September 6. He singled in Jon Jay to drive in the 1,000th run of his career on June 17 at Busch Stadium against Washington, the 277th player in MLB history to do so. While batting against Dan Haren of the Dodgers on July 19, Holliday hit his 400th career double and hit a 435 feet (133 m) home run for his 1,000th run scored.

The Arizona Fall League announced on July 20 that Holliday, along with fellow outfielder Carl Crawford, were selected to their Hall of Fame. For the week ending September 2, Holliday was the NL Player of the Week, following a major league-leading 13 RBI—four of which each won separate contests—and an NL-leading four home runs, .889 slugging percentage and 24 total bases while the Cardinals took over first place in the NL Central. On September 12, his 467 feet (142 m) home run against the Rockies was the longest home of the season at Busch Stadium and the second-longest in the stadium's history, just after the one he had hit two years earlier against the Cubs. From August 30 to the end of the season, he batted .538 with RISP. He finished the season with a .272 average, 20 home runs, 90 RBI (eighth in the NL), 37 doubles, 83 runs scored, 74 BB (eighth), 247 times on base (sixth), .370 on-base percentage (10th) and .443 slugging percentage. Seventeen of Holliday's 20 home runs traveled at least 400 feet (120 m); his home run true distance average of 417.9 feet (127.4 m) led all MLB. For the ninth consecutive season, Holliday recorded at least 20 home runs, 30 doubles, 75 RBI and 80 runs scored, becoming just the fifth player in MLB history to do so. The others with this exploit were Stan Musial (10), Manny Ramirez (10), Pujols (10), and Miguel Cabrera (nine).

The Cardinals finished first in the NL Central division to enter the postseason for the fifth time and faced the Dodgers in an NLDS for the second time in six seasons since acquiring Holliday. After finding themselves down 6–1 in Game 1, Holliday provided a three-run home run off reliever Pedro Báez that was the difference in a 10–9 victory. The Cardinals faced the Giants in an NLCS rematch but were defeated in five games. For the National League MVP voting, he placed 14th, marking the eighth time he received votes.

==== 2015–16 ====
Holliday opened the 2015 season with a 12-game hitting streak that evolved into a sequence of reaching base in each of the first 45 games of the season, breaking Pujols's National League record of 42 games to open a season which he set in 2008. It was the longest such streak in MLB since Derek Jeter garnered 53 in 1999. Dating back to the end of 2014, Holliday's continuity of reaching base spanned 47 games. The venture reached finality on June 2 against the Brewers after umpire Joe West ejected him for arguing a called third strike, the fourth ejection of his career.

On June 8, Holliday suffered a right quadriceps strain while diving for a fly ball off the bat of the Rockies' Carlos González, and the Cardinals placed him on the 15-day DL. At the time, he was batting .303 with three home runs and 26 RBI, and had been receiving strong fan support in the All-Star Game voting. He continued to reap considerable vote totals in spite of missing a month, and eventually was chosen a starting outfielder for the first time in his career. He was rendered unable to play in the game due to the quadriceps injury.

After returning from the DL, Holliday's first home run was a grand slam on July 21 against Carlos Rodon of the Chicago White Sox in an 8–5 win, his sixth career grand slam. He reinjured the right quadriceps on July 30, prompting the club to retract him to the DL. The Cardinals reactivated him on September 15 after missing 41 games. Holliday played 73 games and finished the season with a .279 batting average, .394 on-base percentage, .410 slugging percentage, .804 OPS, four home runs and 35 RBI in 277 plate appearances.

The Cardinals started Holliday at first base on Opening Day of the 2016 season, a position he had not previously played during his career. On May 6 against Pittsburgh, Holliday collected his 512th hit at Busch Stadium, breaking his personal tie of 511 hits at Coors Field. Having already achieved 500 hits at both stadiums, he became the only active player with at least 500 hits at multiple stadiums, and just the fourteenth to do so within the previous 50 years. Holliday hit a home run on May 30 that traveled 466 feet (142 m) off Jhan Mariñez that nearly exited Miller Park in a 6–0 defeat of the Brewers. The next day, also against the Brewers, he collected his 1,000th career hit with the Cardinals.

A 94 miles per hour (151 km/h) fastball from the Cubs' Mike Montgomery on August 11, 2016, struck Holliday on the right thumb, fracturing it. The Cardinals placed him on the DL. Presented with the option to either allow the thumb to heal naturally or with surgery, Holliday elected surgery as that would have potentially allowed him to return before season's end. He encountered multiple delays in recovery. Having been informed in the final days of the 2016 season that the Cardinals would not pick up the option for 2017 worth $17 million, he was activated from the DL—although his thumb was still fractured—in time for the September 30 game against Pittsburgh. He hit his first career pinch-hit home run in that game and 20th of the season. Holliday released a statement: "While I'm disappointed this could be it here in St. Louis, I understand that it might be time to move on." While his batting average had dropped to a career-low .246, Holliday was optimistic about a rebound. Because he produced the third-highest exit velocity at 94.7 miles per hour (152.4 km/h) of all hitters with at least 100 batted balls in 2016, he concluded that to "have my misses be more in the air than on the ground, my numbers could really get back toward where they have been my whole career."

=== New York Yankees (2017) ===
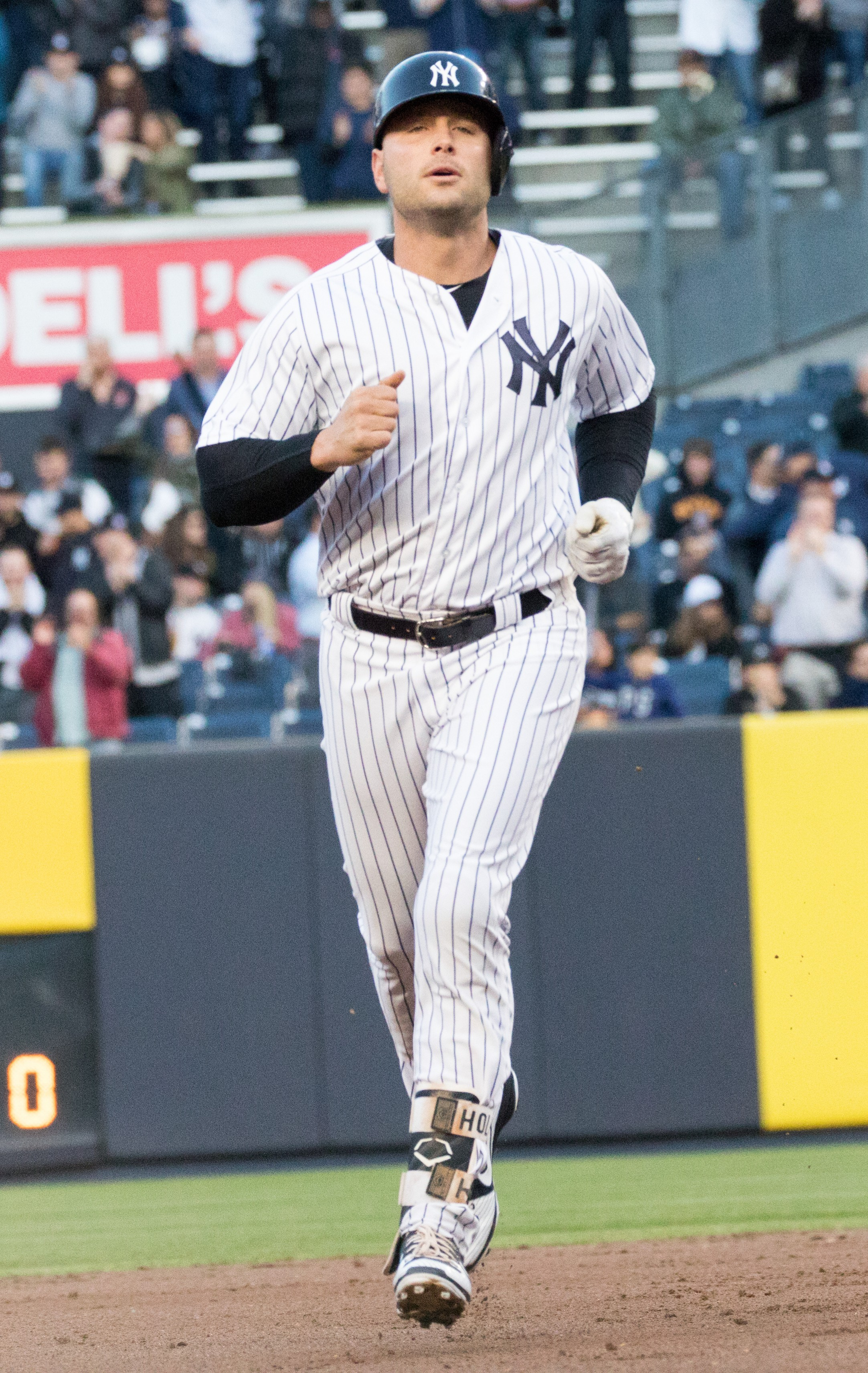
Holliday with the New York Yankees in 2017

After becoming a free agent for the second time in his career, on December 7, 2016, Holliday signed a one-year contract with the New York Yankees worth $13 million, to become their primary designated hitter (DH). One provision to the contract was an unusual, "enormously specific", no-trade clause to one team: the Oakland Athletics.

His first RBI and double for the Yankees came on the same play on April 4, 2017, versus the Tampa Bay Rays at Tropicana Field, in the third inning of a 5–0 Yankees win. His first home run for the Yankees was on April 7, on a pitch by Baltimore Orioles starter Ubaldo Jiménez in the third inning of a 6–5 loss. The following day, Holliday collected his 2,000th career hit versus Kevin Gausman, a first-inning single, in a 5–4 loss to the Orioles. Holliday drew a career-high five walks on April 9, tying a Yankees franchise record. On April 28, Holliday hit a walk-off three-run home run off Jayson Aquino, which capped a comeback after trailing 1−9, and helped a 14−11 win over the Orioles.

Holliday hit his 300th career home run on May 3, versus Marcus Stroman of the Toronto Blue Jays. He became the 93rd player in major league history to reach that milestone along with 2,000 hits.

On June 28, Holliday was placed on the 10-day disabled list due to a viral infection. On July 5, it was revealed that Holliday tested positive for Epstein-Barr virus, which causes mononucleosis. He hit a game-tying home run in the ninth inning versus Craig Kimbrel of the Boston Red Sox on July 15, which the Yankees eventually won in 16 innings, 4−1. On August 6, Holliday was again placed on the 10-day disabled list due to a lower back strain. For the 2017 season, he batted .231/.316/.432.

=== Colorado Rockies (2018) ===
On July 28, 2018, Holliday signed a minor league contract with the Colorado Rockies. The Rockies assigned him to the Albuquerque Isotopes. On August 23, Holliday was placed in the starting lineup, to play left field for the Colorado Rockies at Coors Field, against the San Diego Padres. Infielder Garrett Hampson was optioned to Albuquerque to make room on the 25-man roster, and in the process, Hampson's uniform number 7 was given to Holliday; Hampson would wear #1 upon his return to the club in September.

In 2018, he batted .283/.415/.434 in 53 at-bats. He had the slowest baserunning sprint speed of all major league left fielders, at 25.1 feet/second. He was the fourth-oldest player in the National League.

Holliday elected free agency on October 29 and retired that offseason. He was voted into the St. Louis Cardinals Hall of Fame in May 2022, and was inducted to the "Red Jacket Club" in August 2022.

Holliday was eligible for election to the National Baseball Hall of Fame starting in 2024. However, he received less than the 5% threshold of votes needed to remain on the ballot in subsequent years.

== Coaching career ==
On July 18, 2019, Holliday announced he would be joining his brother Josh's coaching staff at Oklahoma State as an outfield and hitting coach.

On November 6, 2022, Holliday rejoined the St. Louis Cardinals as their bench coach, but he resigned from the position on January 12, 2023, prior to the season.

== Awards and accomplishments ==
=== Championships, awards, and honors ===
Championships earned or shared
Title	Times	Dates	Ref
Arizona League champion	1	1998	
National League batting champion	1	2007	
National League champion	3	2007, 2011, 2013	
World Series champion	1	2011	

Awards received
Name of award	Times	Dates	Ref
All-American, high school baseball	1	1997	
All-American, high school football	1	1997	
Baseball America All-Rookie team	1	2004	
BBWAA St. Louis chapter Darryl Kile Good Guy Award	1	2010	
Carolina League Player of the Month	1	June 2001	
Colorado Rockies Player of the Year	2	2005, 2007	
Gatorade Player of the Year, Regional level, baseball	1	1997	
Gatorade Player of the Year, Regional level, football	1	1997	
Major League Baseball All-Star	7	2006−08, 2010−12, 2015	
Major League Baseball Home Run Derby participant	3	2007, 2010, 2011	
Missouri Athletic Club Sports Personality of the Year	1	2012	
National League Championship Series MVP Award	1	2007	
National League Player of the Month	1	September 2007	
National League Player of the Week	7	July 31, 2005; September 24, 2006; July 29, 2007; September 16, 2007; April 13, 2008; June 20, 2010; September 2, 2014	
Silver Slugger Award at outfield	4	2006−08, 2010	
Southern League Hitter of the Week	2	June 27 and July 18, 2002	
Southern League Mid-Season All-Star	1	2002	
Sporting News All-Star team	2	2007, 2010	
Topps All-Star Rookie team	1	2004	

Honors received
Act of honor bestowed	Dates	Ref
Arizona Fall League Hall of Fame inductee	2014	
Matt Holliday Day in Oklahoma, December 14	declared 2007	
Stillwater High School jersey number 24 retired	2007	
National High School Hall of Fame inductee	2021	

=== Statistical achievements ===
Notes: Through 2015 season. Per Baseball-Reference.com.

National League statistical leader
Category	Times	Dates
Batting champion	1	2007
Doubles leader	1	2007
Extra base hits leader	1	2007
Hits leader	1	2007
Runs batted in leader	1	2007
Total bases leader	1	2007

National League top-ten ranking
Category	Times	Seasons	Category	Times	Seasons
Adjusted on-base plus slugging	7	2006–08, 2010–13	Home runs	1	2007
Bases on balls	2	2012, 2014	On-base percentage	7	2007–08, 2010–14
Batting average	5	2005–08, 2010	On-base plus slugging percentage	7	2006–08, 2010–13
Double plays grounded into	5	2006, 2008, 2011, 2013, 2014	Runs batted in	7	2006, 2007, 2009, 2010, 2012–14
Doubles	4	2006, 2007, 2010, 2011	Runs scored	5	2006–08, 2012, 2013
Extra base hits	4	2006, 2007, 2010, 2012	Slugging percentage	4	2006–08, 2010
Games played	3	2010, 2012, 2014	Stolen bases	1	2008
Hits	4	2006, 2007, 2010, 2012	Times on base	6	2007, 2008, 2010, 2012–14
			Total bases	4	2006, 2007, 2010, 2012

Benchmarks achieved
Min	Category	Times	Seasons	Min	Category	Times	Seasons
135	adjusted on-base plus slugging	8	2005–13	.900	on-base plus slugging	6	2006–11
70	bases on balls	4	2008, 2009, 2012, 2014	100	runs batted in	5	2006, 2007, 2009, 2010, 2012
.300	batting average	7	2005–10, 2013	100	runs scored	4	2006–08, 2013
10	double plays grounded into	9	2005–07, 2009–14	.500	Slugging percentage	7	2005–11
30	doubles	10	2004, 2006–14	25	stolen bases	1	2008
150	games played	6	2006, 2007, 2009, 2010, 2012, 2014	.370	on-base percentage	9	2006–14
200	hits	1	2007	250	total bases	8	2006–10, 2012–14
30	home runs	2	2006–07				

=== Records and other distinctions ===
Records held
Venue or organization	Achievement	Statistic	Date accomplished	Date surpassed	Ref
Busch Stadium	Longest home run	469 feet (143 m)	July 20, 2012	June 30, 2016	
Colorado Rockies	Most RBI in a single game (tied)	8	September 20, 2005	Current	
Colorado Rockies	Most RBI in the month of September	32	2005	Current	
Colorado Rockies	Longest on-base streak	38 games	2007	Current	
National League	Longest on-base streak to start a season	45 games	2015	Current	
St. Louis Cardinals	Most double plays ground into in one season	31	2013	Current	

Other accomplishments and distinctions
Achievement	No. of players	Dates achieved	Dates inclusive	Ref
Nine or more consecutive seasons of 20 HR, 30 doubles, 75 RBI and 80 runs scored	5	2006−14	All MLB history	
195 hits, 30 home runs, 45 doubles, 115 runs and 110 RBI in one season	19	2006	All MLB history	
200 hits and 50 doubles in one season	13	2007	1962–2007	
2× grand slam and additional home run in team's record-breaking comeback victory for runs deficit: vs. Marlins: 18–17 win after 9-run deficit (Rockies record); vs. Twins: 14–13 win after 10-run deficit (A's record)		July 4, 2008 July 20, 2009		
Hit 11 home runs in 12 games	2	2007		
ESPN Longest Home Run of season, 498 feet (152 m)		2006		
3× longest home run of season at Busch Stadium		2012−14		
MLB longest home run average true distance of season, 417.9 feet (127.4 m)		2014		

== Player profile ==
Former Cardinals hitting coach Mark McGwire described Holliday as "a very good on-base guy. He'll take the walks. He knows how to work the count. He uses the whole field. Once in a while he'll tap into his strength and hit homers. He's just really good." Comparing his approach to that of Pujols and Adrián González, McGwire also commented that "Matt's very strong mentally. I can't emphasize enough how this game is a mental grind. The stronger ones do survive, and the stronger ones you see throughout their career, the numbers are always there."

Pundits and fans have consistently questioned Holliday's durability, and thus his effectiveness as a hitter, into the final guaranteed year of the contract he signed in 2010. However, during each of its first five seasons, he played no fewer than 124 games. In each of the first 11 seasons of his career, including his rookie year, he played at least 121 games.

Throughout his career, Holliday has received criticism for his defense. After signing with the Yankees, he was projected to play mainly DH, as sportswriter George King observed, "Yankee Stadium's vast left field and the 6-foot-4, 240-pound Holliday aren't a good marriage, but he might be able to navigate a much smaller right field in a pinch."

=== Survey of free agent contract signed in 2010 ===
The contract to which Holliday and the Cardinals agreed before the 2010 season was widely viewed as a great success. Over its first five seasons, he averaged 147 games per season, .295 batting average, .383 OBP and .496 SLG for a 141 OPS+; his counting stats average included 24 home runs, 93 RBI, and 92 runs scored. He totaled 119 homers and 185 doubles in that span. Since being acquired from Oakland, Holliday ranked fifth in MLB in RBI, doubles, and runs scored, ninth in extra-base hits, and 14th in OPS.

Fangraphs' Wins Above Replacement (WAR) formula rated Holliday's production equivalent to nearly $110 million in value while actually being paid just $84 million. In that span, he ranked 11th in all MLB, and fifth among outfielders, with 23.8 WAR. Holliday was a key factor in the 2011 championship run with a big NLCS. With RISP, Holliday had hit .315 with a .407 OBP and .486 SLG during his Cardinals years. Since Busch Stadium opened in 2006, he hit .309 with a .403 OBP, .542 SLG; only Pujols had more home runs, RBI and a higher OPS. At $17.2 million in total earnings, Forbes magazine ranked Holliday as the 99th-highest paid athlete in the world in 2014.

In spite of missing significant time in 2015 and 2016, Holliday contributed 24.1 WAR during the life of his 2010−16 contract with St. Louis, worth $168.6 million in total contributions according to Fangraphs.

== Personal life ==
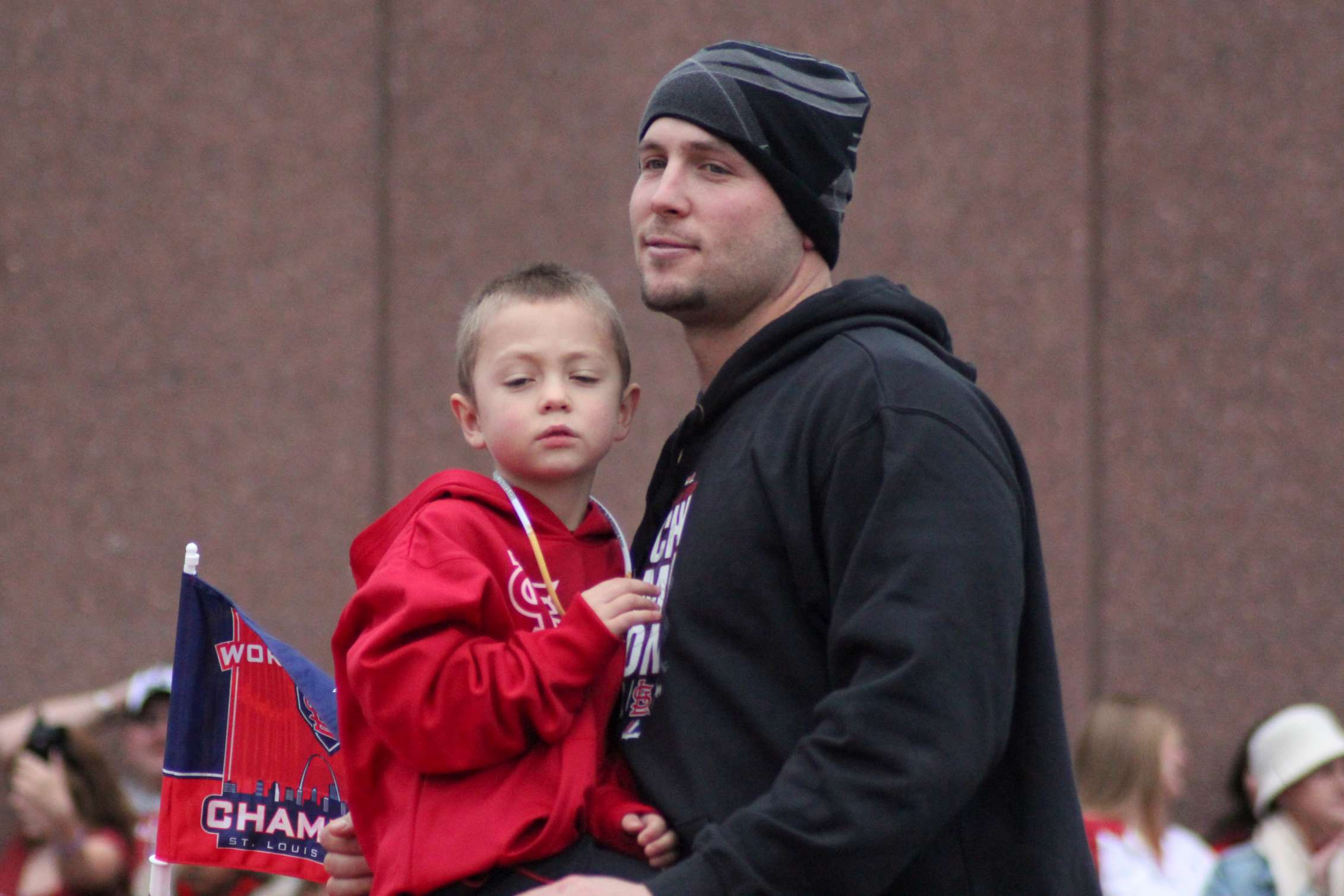
Holliday with his son, Jackson, during the 2011 World Series victory parade in St. Louis

Holliday and his wife, Leslee, married on December 30, 2000. They met on a blind date in 1999 in Stillwater during the baseball offseason when Matt had returned home from his first professional season following his selection by the Rockies in the MLB draft and Leslee was an undergraduate at OSU. Holliday's best friend was dating a friend of Leslee's, and they wanted to do a double date, so her friend asked if she would go with Matt. The Hollidays currently reside in Stillwater, Oklahoma, and Jupiter, Florida, and have four children. They have three sons, Jackson (born December 4, 2003), Ethan (b. February 23, 2007), and Reed (b. July 24, 2013) and a daughter, Gracyn (b. November 7, 2009). Jackson was selected first overall in the 2022 Major League Baseball draft by the Baltimore Orioles and made his MLB debut in 2024. Ethan went 4th overall to the Colorado Rockies in 2025.

The Hollidays formerly resided in Austin, Texas, during the offseason until December 2010, following his signing of the contract with the Cardinals in January 2010. During the offseason, Holliday and his family have also lived in Stillwater, where he also has worked with his brother, Josh, on his swing. In the 2014−15 offseason, Holliday and his family moved to South Florida, allowing him to stay in optimal shape year-round, and his sons to continue to play sports in the winter months.

Holliday is a Christian and was part of a Bible study group with fellow Christian teammates. He has spoken about his faith saying, "I play for God. It says in the Bible that we are to do all things for Him. ... So I try to do the best that I can for Him. This is my job, not who I am." Leslee has led a Bible study in the St. Louis area for professional athletes' wives.

Holliday's favorite player growing up was Cal Ripken Jr. He has stated that if he had a dream car it would be a Bentley Continental GT, rather than a sports car, because he is "too big for small sports cars".

Scott Boras represented Holliday as his agent since he turned professional. Holliday described his relationship with Boras and his staff in that he "enjoy(s) sitting down and talking to them. Scott is as accessible as you want him to be. I could call him right now. He's got a lot of clients and people say they don't hear from Scott but he'll give you as much or as little attention as you want." Holliday further explained that due to the amenities the Boras Corporation provides, including a staff psychologist, research to assist players in prolonging careers, studies into arbitration cases, and statistical performance computation, he felt that Boras' agency gave him the best opportunities to succeed.

Known primarily as a reserved figure, Holliday played for years in the shadows of such franchise icons as Todd Helton and Albert Pujols, who accommodated his demeanor well. However, he has emerged as a veteran presence for the Cardinals willing to assist and entertain younger players and top prospects as they attempt to adjust to a lifestyle of playing baseball. In January 2012, he invited Matt Adams, Ryan Jackson, Charlie Tilson and Kolten Wong for a weeklong stay in St. Louis at the tony Frontenac Hotel. Activities included eating out, hitting, working out and attending a St. Louis Blues game. Holliday also became more active on his Twitter account and more readily availed himself as a guest on talk radio shows. Further, he befriended former teammate David Freese, who, shortly after Holliday's arrival in St. Louis in 2009, was arrested for driving under the influence. However, after becoming daily workout partners and socializing, teammates noted a "positive influence" on Freese.

With intense off-season physical training regimens, Holliday plays squash and likes to incorporate an NFL approach. He has trained with teammates, such as Freese, and pitcher Trevor Rosenthal, in activities such as "sled pushing, tire flipping and some fireman carries", and each player taking turns carrying each other for about 20 meters.

One opponent with long-time ties to the Hollidays is former Boston Red Sox manager John Farrell. Farrell pitched for Tom Holliday at OSU, helping propel them to four College World Series appearances. When Matt and Josh were still toddlers, Farrell often babysat them when their parents went out. Years later, when Matt Holliday was a member of the Rockies team that played the Red Sox in the 2007 World Series, Farrell was the Red Sox pitching coach. Six years after that, as a member of the St. Louis Cardinals, Holliday again played against Farrell. This time, he was the Red Sox manager. In both Series, however, Farrell's teams were victorious over Holliday's.

== See also ==
- Colorado Rockies individual awards
- List of largest sports contracts
- List of Major League Baseball annual doubles leaders
- List of Major League Baseball annual runs batted in leaders
- List of Major League Baseball batting champions
- List of Major League Baseball career hit by pitch leaders
- List of Major League Baseball career hits leaders
- List of Major League Baseball career home run leaders
- List of Major League Baseball career OPS leaders
- List of Major League Baseball career runs batted in leaders
- List of Major League Baseball career runs scored leaders
- List of Major League Baseball career slugging percentage leaders
- List of St. Louis Cardinals team records
- St. Louis Cardinals award winners and league leaders

Awards
Preceded by Rocco Baldelli; Jody Gerut; Scott Podsednik	Topps All-Star Rookie Outfielder; 2004	Succeeded by Jeff Francoeur; Jonny Gomes; Willy Taveras
Preceded by Mark Teixeira	National League Player of the Month; September 2007	Succeeded by Chase Utley
