= Jackson Holliday =

American baseball player (born 2003)

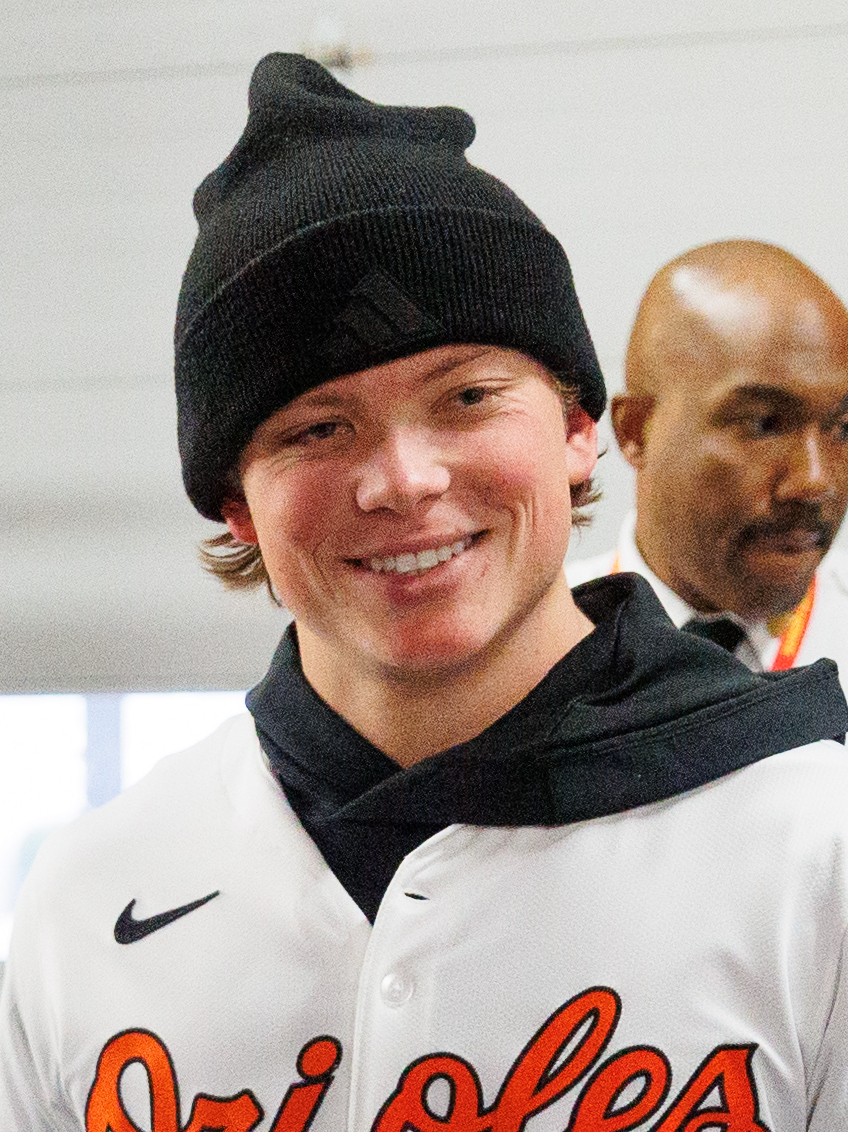
- Holliday with the Baltimore Orioles in 2025

Baltimore Orioles – No. 7
- Second baseman / Shortstop
- Born: December 4, 2003 (age 22); Austin, Texas, U.S.
- Bats: Left Throws: Right

MLB debut
- April 10, 2024, for the Baltimore Orioles

MLB statistics (through 2026 season)
- Batting average: .229
- Home runs: 29
- Runs batted in: 108
- Stats at Baseball Reference

Teams
- Baltimore Orioles (2024–present)

Jackson Matthew Holliday (born December 4, 2003) is an American professional baseball infielder for the Baltimore Orioles of Major League Baseball (MLB). He was selected first overall by the Orioles in the 2022 MLB draft and made his MLB debut in 2024. He is the son of former MLB All-Star Matt Holliday.

== Early life ==
Holliday attended Stillwater High School in Stillwater, Oklahoma. After his freshman year, he committed to play college baseball at Oklahoma State University. As a junior in 2021, Holliday had a .501 batting average with six home runs and 50 runs batted in (RBIs). He was also named the Central Oklahoma Athletic Conference Defensive Player of the Year. That summer, he played in various national events including the Perfect Game All-American Classic at Petco Park. He also was named to USA Baseball's 18-and-under team.

Holliday entered his senior year in 2022 as a top prospect for the upcoming draft. During a game against Union High School, he hit three home runs. In another game, he hit two home runs in the same inning. He finished the season batting .685 with 17 home runs, 79 RBIs, 29 doubles, and 30 stolen bases over 40 games. He set a national record for hits in a season for an amateur player with 89, surpassing the previous record of 88 set by J. T. Realmuto in 2010. He was named the Oklahoma Gatorade Baseball Player of the Year. He was the third in his family to win the award alongside his father and uncle. He was also awarded an ABCA/Rawlings Gold Glove.

== Professional career ==
=== Minor leagues ===
The Baltimore Orioles selected Holliday with the first overall pick in the 2022 Major League Baseball draft. He signed with the team for $8.19 million, the largest signing bonus ever for a high school player. Holliday made his professional debut on August 11 with the Rookie-level Florida Complex League Orioles, going 1-for-3 with a stolen base. Later in August, he was promoted to the Delmarva Shorebirds of the Single-A Carolina League. Over twenty games between both teams, he batted .297 with one home run, nine RBIs, and four stolen bases.

Holliday began the 2023 season with the Shorebirds, where he batted .396/.522/.660 with six doubles, one triple, two home runs and 16 RBIs in 14 games. He was promoted twice during the first four months, first to the High–A Aberdeen IronBirds on April 24 and then to the Double–A Bowie Baysox on July 9. His slash line with the Ironbirds was .314/.452/.488 with 11 doubles, five triples, five home runs, and 35 RBIs in 57 games. He hit .338/.421/.507 with nine doubles, three triples, three home runs, and 15 RBIs in 36 games with the Baysox before his promotion to the Triple–A Norfolk Tides on September 4. In 18 games for Norfolk, he batted .267/.396/.400 with two home runs and nine RBIs. Following the season, Holliday was named the Baseball America Minor League Player of the Year.

Invited to spring training in 2024 as a non-roster player, the Orioles assigned Holliday to Norfolk for the start of the season. He batted .333/.482/.595 with two home runs through ten Triple-A games in 2024 and has a career .321 average and .949 on-base plus slugging (OPS) in Minor League Baseball.

=== Major leagues ===
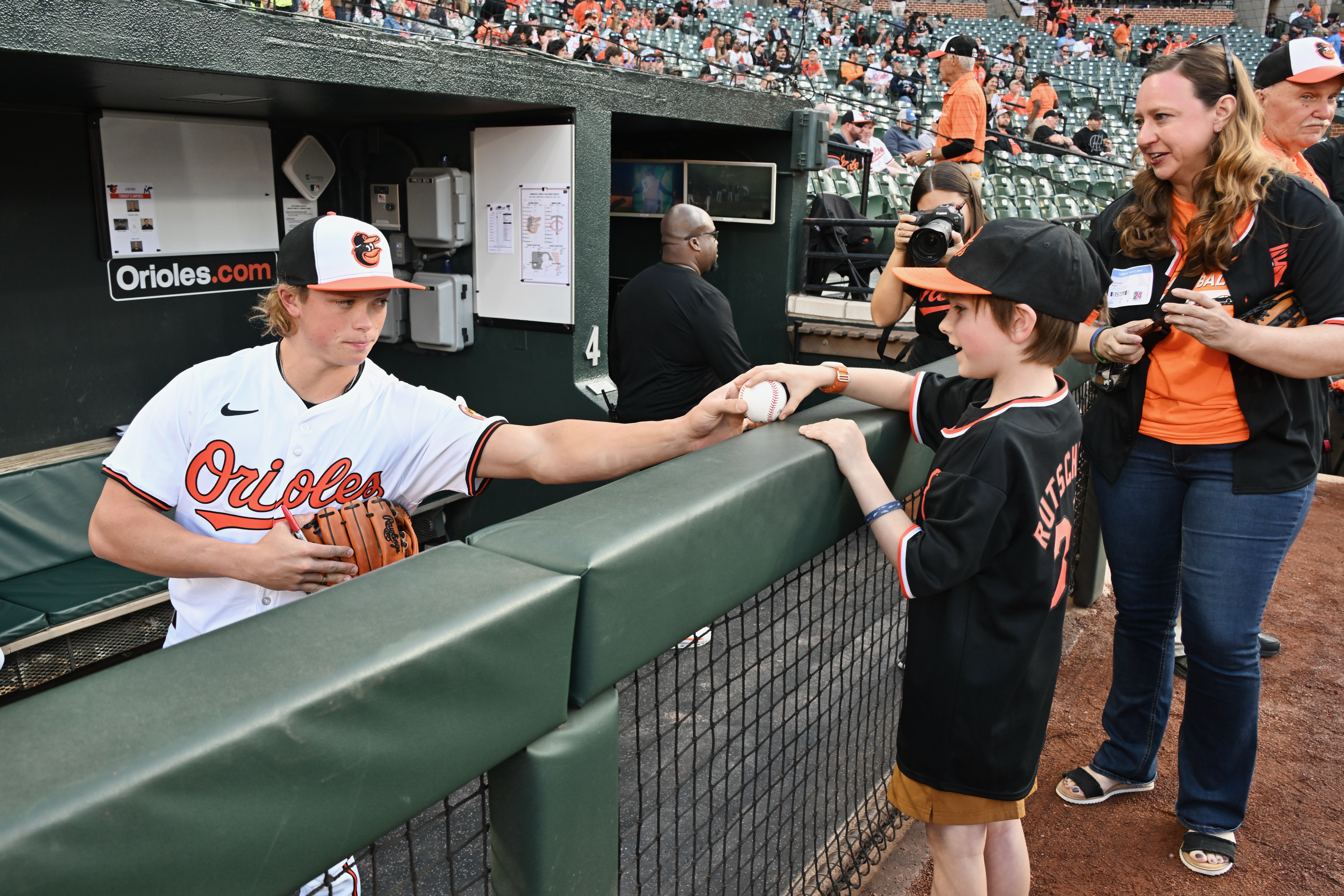
Holliday signs a fan's baseball in 2024

On April 10, 2024, the Baltimore Orioles selected Holliday's contract and promoted him to the major leagues for the first time. He was assigned the no. 7 uniform and made his major league debut that night as a second baseman against the Boston Red Sox and went 0–4 with 1 RBI at the plate. He knocked his first major league hit in a game against the Milwaukee Brewers on April 14, and later scored the go-ahead run. After batting 2-for-34 (.059) in 10 games, the Orioles optioned Holliday to Norfolk on April 26.

Holliday slashed .259/.421/.455 with 20 doubles, eight home runs, and 29 RBI in 63 games with the Tides prior to being recalled by the Orioles for a second time on July 31. He hit his first major-league home run later that day, a one-out grand slam onto Eutaw Street off Yerry Rodríguez in the fifth inning of a 10–4 home win over the Toronto Blue Jays. He achieved his first four-hit MLB game in a 12–10 home loss to the Red Sox on August 16, 2024. The final stats in his MLB rookie campaign were .189/.255/.311/.565 in 60 games.

On May 4, 2025, Holliday went 3-for-4 and homered twice in an 11-6 loss to the Kansas City Royals. It was Holliday's first multi-homer game of his career. He, Jeremiah Jackson, and Alex Jackson combined to retire Carson Kelly at home plate to end the first inning in a 5–3 away loss to the Chicago Cubs on August 3. This was the first time in MLB's Modern Era (since 1900) that a team started at least three players whose given name or surname was Jackson. On August 13, Jackson got his first career walk-off hit in a 4–3 win against the Seattle Mariners when he hit a double in the bottom of the ninth inning with two outs, driving in teammate Dylan Carlson. It was also the Orioles' first walk-off victory of the season, the only team up to that point to not have one.

On February 11, 2026, it was announced that Holliday would begin the season on the injured list due to a fractured hamate bone in his right hand that required surgery. He was activated from the injured list on May 18, and made his season debut the following day. During the 2026 season, Holliday hit .229 with a .640 on-base-plus-slugging percentage. On September 16, Holliday was placed on the injured list; a week later, it was announced that Holliday would undergo left wrist surgery to address a tear of his triangular fibrocartilage complex.

== Personal life ==
Holliday is the son of former major leaguer and seven-time All-Star Matt Holliday and grandson of coach Tom Holliday. His brother, Ethan, was selected with the fourth pick in the 2025 MLB draft by the Rockies. Holliday's uncle, Josh Holliday, is the head baseball coach at Oklahoma State.

On December 28, 2022, Holliday got engaged to his girlfriend, Chloé Cox. They were married on January 6, 2024.

Holliday is a Christian.
