= Stillwater Public Schools =

School district in Oklahoma

Coordinates: 36.118793°N 97.057297°W

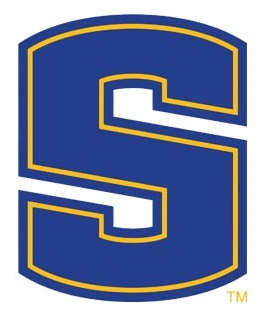

Location
- 314 South Lewis Street; Stillwater, Oklahoma 74074 Payne County United States of America

District information
- Type: Public, Primary, Secondary, Co-Educational
- Grades: Elementary PK-5; Middle School 6-7; Junior High School 8-9; High School 10-12 /> Alternative Academy 9-12
- Superintendent: Tyler Bridges
- Schools: 10 (Including one alternative academy)
- Budget: $60,500,000

Students and staff
- Students: 6049
- Teachers: 425
- Athletic conference: 6A District

Other information
- Website: www.stillwaterschools.com

The Stillwater Public School District is located in Stillwater, Oklahoma, United States. The Stillwater school district has nine schools together with an alternative education program.

The district is managed by the Superintendent Tyler Bridges, who works under the direction of a five-person board.

The mascot of both the district and the high school is the Pioneers.

== Schools ==
=== High school ===
- Stillwater High School (Grades 9–12)

=== Middle school ===
- Stillwater Junior High School (Grade 8)
- Stillwater Middle School (Grades 6–7)

Stillwater OSSAA Athletic Championships
SPORT	TITLES	YEAR(S)
Baseball	2	1957, 2014
Boys Basketball	3	1923, 1959, 1960
Girls Basketball	1	1926
Boys Swimming	3	1973, 1974, 2014
Girls Swimming	2	1998, 2015
Girls Tennis	1	1982
Boys Track and Field	1	1953
Wrestling	12	1922, 1923, 1924, 1931, 1954, 1969, 1970, 2014, 2021, 2022, 2023, 2025
Wrestling Dual	4	2015, 2022, 2023, 2025
Total	29

=== Elementary schools ===
All elementary schools host grades pre-k through fifth grade.

- Highland Park Elementary School
- Richmond Elementary School
- Sangre Ridge Elementary School
- Skyline Elementary School
- Westwood Elementary School
- Will Rogers Elementary School

== Alternative education ==
- Lincoln Academy

== Shooting ==
On 26 September 2012, a student died by a self-inflicted gunshot at Stillwater Junior High School.

== Grade Reconfiguration Controversy ==
In March 2013, then Superintendent Dr. Ann Caine presented the school board with the possibility of reconfiguring the grades to move fifth grade to the middle school, seventh grade to the junior high, and move ninth grade to the high school. The district proposed these measures to assist with needed budgets cuts. Some parents opposed the reconfiguration and spending cuts, because the schedule change "would limit ...opportunities for concurrent enrollment" in a university town and "Teaching positions were being reduced instead of higher administration."

The acting Superintendent Dr. Ann Caine modified the plan to change the schedule change at the high school after students started a #KeepTheBlock Facebook page and change.org petition generated support in the community.

In November 2014, the Board voted to delay the reconfiguration due to needed building repairs and staffing concerns. In July 2015, after the retirement of Superintendent Dr. Ann Caine, the board delayed the reconfiguration, due to concerns about academics and renovations. Through 2015, the budget continued to be an issue, with the board making spending choices on repairs to athletics instead of funding the libraries and restoring funding that had been cut in previous budgetary crises.
