= Harrisburg School District (Oregon) =

Public school district in Oregon, U.S.

Harrisburg School District is a public school district that serves the city of Harrisburg, Oregon, United States, and the surrounding rural area of Benton, Linn, and Lane counties.

The district consists of three schools: Harrisburg Elementary School, Harrisburg Middle School, and Harrisburg High School. Total enrollment for the district is approximately 939.
