= Harrisburg High School (Oregon) =

Public school in Harrisburg, Oregon, United States

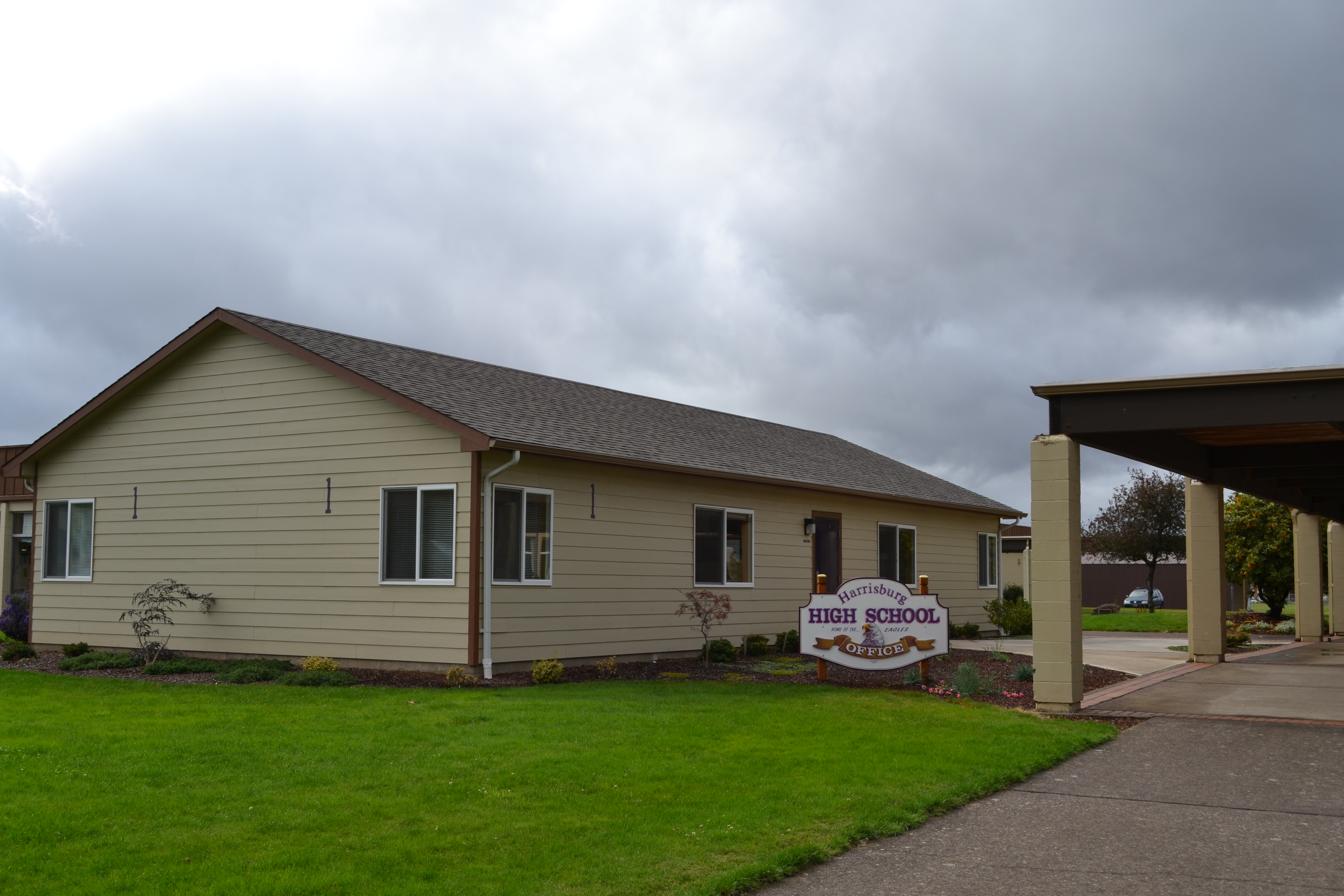

Location
- 400 S 9th Street; Harrisburg, (Linn County), Oregon 97446; United States; 44.269538°N 123.160257°W

Information
- Type: Public
- School district: Harrisburg School District
- Principal: Josh Stauber
- Teaching staff: 19.15 (FTE)
- Grades: 9-12
- Enrollment: 260 (2024-2025)
- Student to teacher ratio: 13.03
- Colors: Purple and gold
- Athletics conference: OSAA PacWest Conference 3A-3
- Mascot: Eagle
- Rival: La Pine High School
- Newspaper: The Eagle
- Website: Harrisburg HS website

Harrisburg High School is a public high school in Harrisburg, Oregon, United States.

== Academics ==
In 2008, 83% of the school's seniors received a high school diploma. Of 75 students, 62 graduated, five dropped out, two received a modified diploma, and six were still in high school the following year.

== Band ==
The Harrisburg band program consists of nearly 50 members. They march in the annual Harrisburg Light Parade every year, and the Victoria Day parade in Canada once every four years. They play at eight basketball games, and every home football game. The band is under the direction of Gus Gyde. The high school's concert, pep, and marching bands all consist of the same members. A jazz band program is offered as a zero period class; the band plays at Hoodoo Ski Resort once a year.

== Sports ==
Under the leadership of Wayne Swango, Harrisburg has won four state titles in baseball, in 1970, 1976, 1980 and 1993. Harrisburg won state championships in 2A softball in 1999, 2000, and 2001, and in 1A Division B football in 1966. They also won the 3A football state championships in 2016. The HHS track team boys won the 3a district meet, three years in a row from the 2009 through 2011, under the leadership of Scott Phelps. In 2016 the Harrisburg eagles won 3A state Champion. The Eagles won a boys' state wrestling championship in 3A in 2026.
