= Stillwater High School (Oklahoma) =

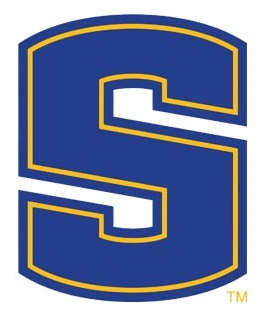

Location
- 1224 North Husband Street; Stillwater, Oklahoma 74075; United States; 36.13524°N 97.06218°W

Information
- Type: Public secondary school
- School district: Stillwater Public Schools
- Authority: OSDE
- Principal: Walter Howell
- Teaching staff: 66.86 (on an FTE basis)
- Grades: 9-12
- Gender: Co-educational
- Enrollment: 1,339 (2023-2024)
- Student to teacher ratio: 19.45
- Colors: Blue and Gold
- Athletics conference: OSSAA Class 6A
- Nickname: Pioneers
- Newspaper: The Excelsior
- Website: Stillwater High School

Stillwater High School is a public secondary school in Stillwater, Oklahoma, United States. It is located at 1224 North Husband Street and is the only high school in the Stillwater Public Schools district. A replacement 188,000-square-foot campus facility is scheduled to open for the 2026–2027 academic school year.

== History ==
The first Senior Class graduated from Stillwater High School in 1901. The earliest students of Stillwater High School attended classes in the Alcott Building constructed in 1896 at Ninth and Duck Street. The Horace Mann School was built 1910 at the same location to accommodate expanding enrollments. The Stillwater High School or South High was built in 1918 at Twelfth and Duck Street. South High is considered by many to be the first real high school. The building has since been renovated and is part of the Stillwater Public Library. In the early 1940s, Stillwater High moved to the North High location at Ninth and Duck Street. This is the building that many refer to as the “Old High School.” It is now the Stillwater Community Center and location of the Stillwater/C.E. Donart Alumni Association and Museum.

By 1960 Stillwater High had a new location and a new name with the construction and dedication of the campus on North Main and Husband Street. Stillwater High School was renamed for Mr. C.E. Donart—honoring his fifty years of service as the clerk of the Stillwater Board of Education and his efforts to build the new high school. The school returned to the original name of Stillwater High School by 1982. Recent additions to the high school at the North Main and Husband location include the SHS Performing Arts Center and 6000-seat Pioneer Stadium.

== Campus ==
=== New campus construction ===
In August 2024, Stillwater Public Schools broke ground on a replacement high school facility located at 1224 North Husband Street, positioned north of the legacy campus. Funded by a community-approved $195 million bond issue, the construction site replaces the former Cimarron Plaza Shopping Center.

The project features an 188,000-square-foot, two-story academic building designed by 505 Architects. The layout includes upgraded science laboratories, specialized performing arts spaces for band and choir, a dedicated visual arts presentation area, and an ICC-500-rated tornado storm shelter. The campus is scheduled to open for the 2026–2027 academic year, after which the legacy high school building is slated for demolition to make room for expanded extracurricular and athletic facilities.

== Athletics ==
- Baseball
- Basketball - Boys
- Basketball - Girls
- Cheerleading
- Cross Country
- Football
- Golf - Boys
- Golf - Girls
- Pom
- Soccer - Boys
- Soccer - Girls
- Softball
- Swimming
- Tennis - Boys
- Tennis - Girls
- Track
- Volleyball
- Wrestling

== Notable alumni ==
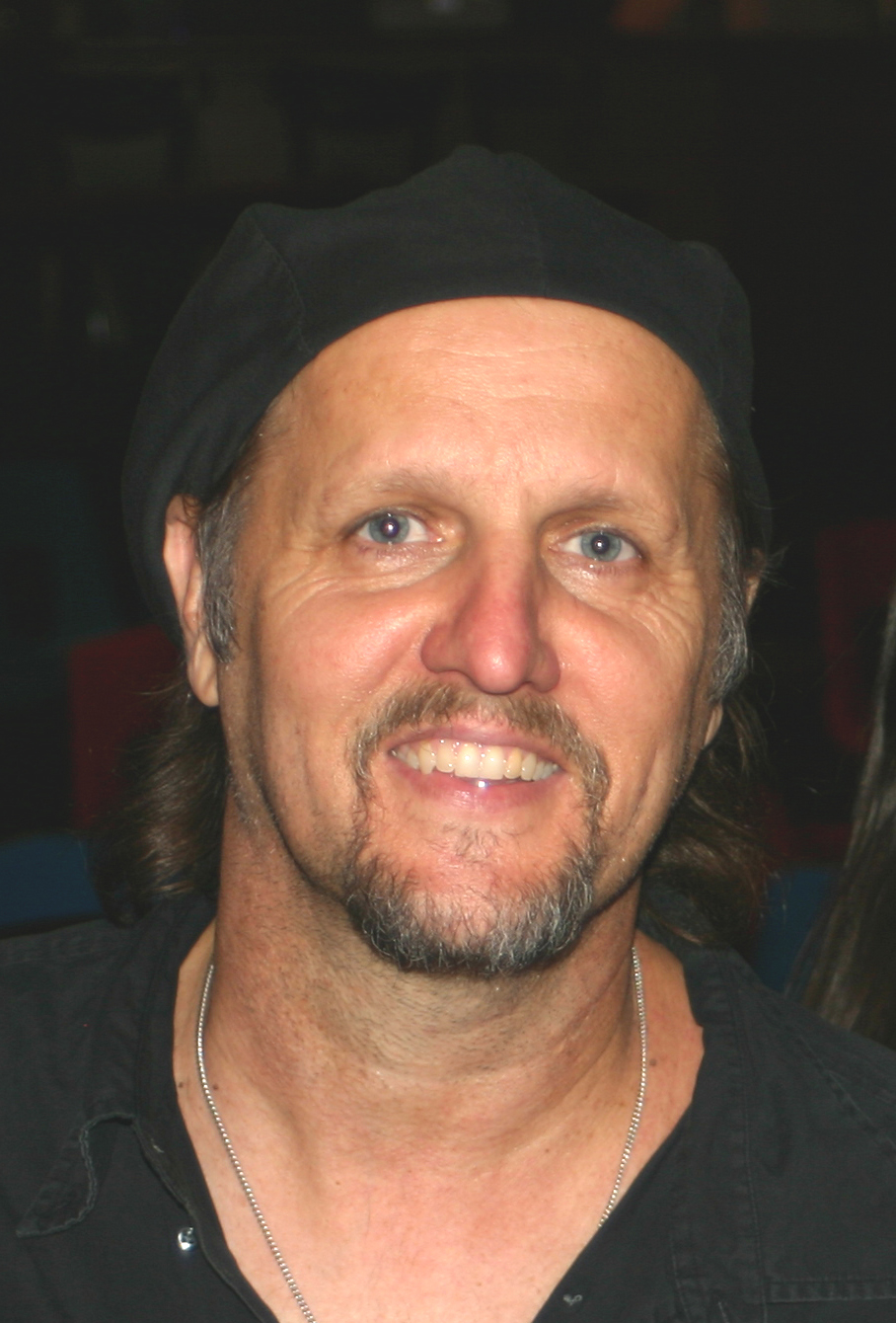
Jimmy LaFave, 2008

- Brett Anderson, former MLB starting pitcher
- Jim "Bad News" Barnes, former NBA 1st round draft pick, first black basketball player to ever win the Oklahoma Player of the Year Award, 1964 Olympic Gold Medal winner in basketball
- Burkhard Bilger, journalist and author
- Josh Fields, former MLB infielder
- Sunny Golloway, head baseball coach at East Central University
- James E. Hill, World War II fighter ace and four-star U.S. Air Force general
- Ethan Holliday, MLB shortstop, selected with the fourth overall pick in the 2025 Major League Baseball draft for the Colorado Rockies
- Jackson Holliday, MLB shortstop, selected with the first overall pick in the 2022 Major League Baseball draft for the Baltimore Orioles
- Matt Holliday, former MLB outfielder
- Moe Iba, former basketball coach
- Howard Keys, former NFL player
- Jimmy LaFave, folk musician
- Tyson Ritter, musician and actor, frontman of The All-American Rejects
- Jackie Shipp, football coach
- Artie Smith, former NFL player
- Yatika Starr Fields, Native American Artist
- Nick Wheeler, musician, guitarist of The All-American Rejects
- Ab Wright, former NFL and MLB player
- Harry M. Wyatt III, Lieutenant General USAF (retired), former Director of the US Air National Guard, nominated by then-President of the United States George W. Bush.
