= Ethan Holliday =

American baseball player (born 2007)

Colorado Rockies
- Shortstop
- Born: February 23, 2007 (age 19); Tucson, Arizona, U.S.
- Bats: Left Throws: Right
- Stats at Baseball Reference

Ethan Smith Holliday (born February 23, 2007) is an American professional baseball shortstop in the Colorado Rockies organization. Holliday was selected with the fourth pick in the 2025 MLB draft by the Rockies.

Holliday attended Stillwater High School in Stillwater, Oklahoma, where he played shortstop.

== Early life and family ==
Holliday was born in Tucson, Arizona and raised in Austin, Texas, to former Major League Baseball player Matt Holliday. He is the younger brother of Jackson Holliday, who was selected first overall in the 2022 Major League Baseball draft by the Baltimore Orioles. His cousin, Brady Holliday, also plays baseball for Stillwater High School. His uncle, Josh Holliday, serves as the head coach of the Oklahoma State Cowboys baseball team, representing Oklahoma State University.

== Amateur career ==
Holliday attended Stillwater High School in Stillwater, Oklahoma, where he played baseball for the varsity team all four years. He was teammates with his older brother Jackson during the 2022 season, Jackson's senior year before being drafted. Holliday committed to attend Oklahoma State on a college baseball scholarship.

In 2022, Holliday was selected for the United States national baseball team that competed in the U-15 Baseball World Cup. The team won the championship and Holliday was named the tournament's top shortstop. Holliday participated in the high school home run derby held during Major League Baseball's All-Star Week.

Before his senior year at Stillwater, Holliday signed a name, image and likeness endorsement deal with Adidas, which was reported as the company's first such agreement with a baseball player.

During his senior season in 2025, Holliday posted a .611 batting average with 19 home runs and 64 runs batted in (RBIs) in 33 games, along with a slugging percentage of 1.295 and an on-base plus slugging (OPS) of 2.038. He also drew 44 walks and scored 57 runs while helping Stillwater reach the Class 6A state tournament with a 25-8 record. Throughout the season, opposing teams frequently chose to intentionally walk Holliday in key situations. In district championship games against Bixby High School, he hit home runs in his first at-bat in both games of the series. In Stillwater's first-round state tournament loss to Piedmont, Holliday was intentionally walked in all three of his plate appearances.

Holliday was named the 2025 Gatorade Oklahoma Baseball Player of the Year, making him the fourth member of his family to receive this honor. He was also selected as Baseball America's 2025 High School Player of the Year, making him and Jackson the first brother tandem to each receive this honor. Other honors include selection to the 2025 Preseason MaxPreps All-America High School Baseball Team and recognition as Prep Baseball Oklahoma's 2025 Player of the Year.

== Professional career ==
Multiple scouting organizations ranked Holliday among the top prospects for the 2025 Major League Baseball draft. MLB.com, Baseball America, and Perfect Game listed him as their number one prospect in the draft class. The Colorado Rockies selected Holliday with the fourth overall selection. Holliday signed with the Rockies for a $9 million signing bonus on July 22, 2025, setting a record for the largest bonus given to a high school player. Holliday played for the Fresno Grizzlies of the Single-A California League after he signed. He batted .239 with two home runs and six RBI in 18 games.

Holliday began the 2026 season with Fresno. He batted .262 with nine home runs and 32 RBI in 33 games before his season ended prematurely due to a stress fracture in his left foot.

== Playing style and scouting reports ==
At 6 feet 4 inches (1.93 m) and 215 pounds (98 kg), Holliday has a larger frame than his brother Jackson and more closely resembles their father Matt physically. Scouts have noted his left-handed swing mechanics and plate discipline. He has demonstrated pitch recognition skills and drawn walks throughout his career.

According to scouting reports, Holliday's power is considered his primary tool, with scouts grading it at 65 on the 20-80 scale. He has recorded exit velocities of 111 miles per hour (179 km/h) with a wood bat. Evaluators project that he could develop into a player capable of hitting 30 or more home runs annually at the professional level.

While playing shortstop as an amateur, many scouts project that Holliday may transition to third base due to his size, though he has worked on his defensive mobility and fundamentals. Some evaluators also consider him a candidate for corner outfield positions.
