= Goldwork =

Goldwork can refer to:

- Goldwork (embroidery)
- Works created by a goldsmith
- Gold metalwork
