= 2007 Major League Baseball season =

2007 MLB season
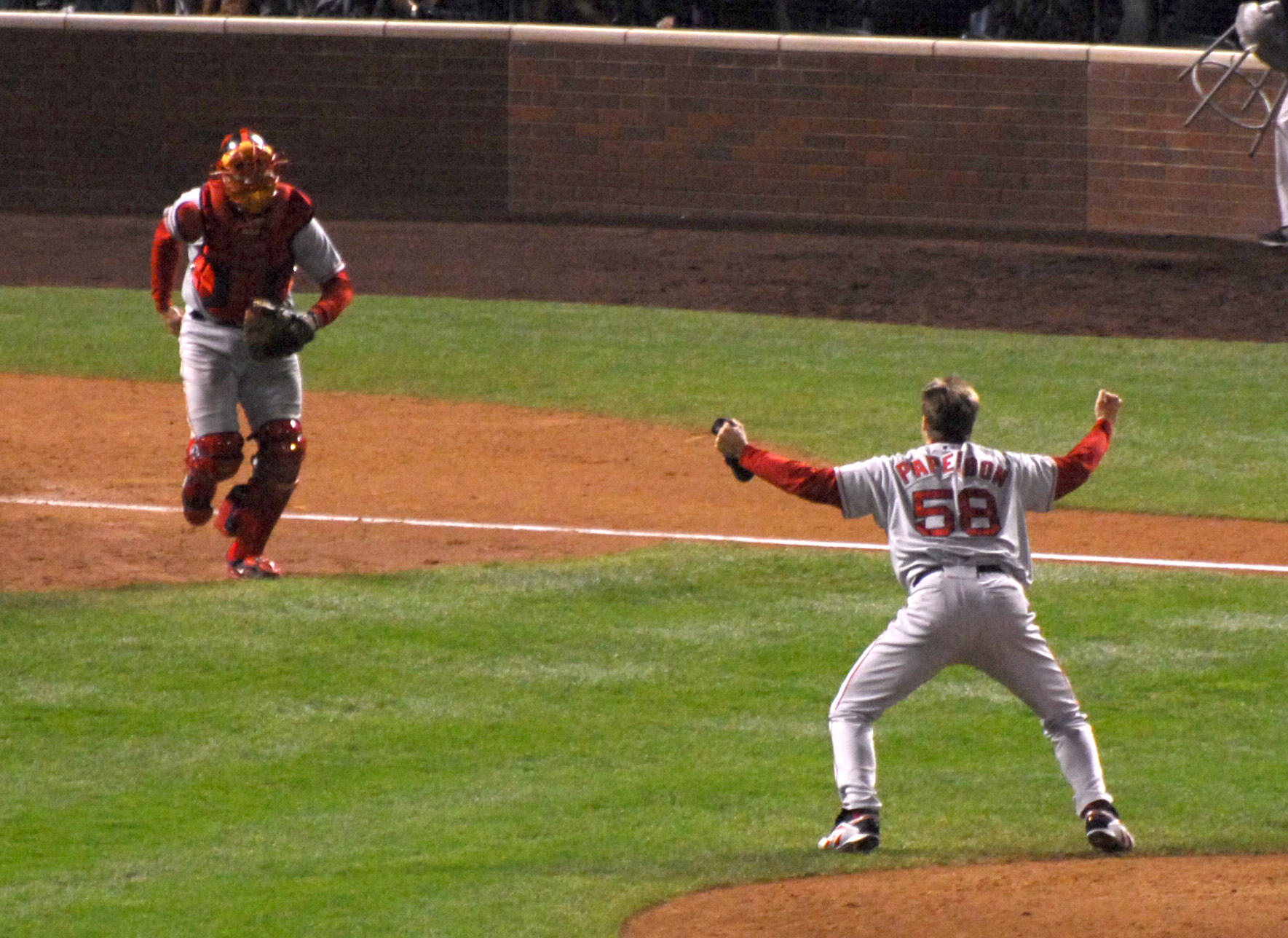
- Jonathan Papelbon (right) and Jason Varitek of the Boston Red Sox celebrate after recording the final out of the 2007 World Series, which the Red Sox won over the Colorado Rockies 4–0.
- League: Major League Baseball
- Sport: Baseball
- Duration: April 1 – October 28, 2007
- Games: 162
- Teams: 30
- TV partner(s): Fox; TBS; ESPN

Draft
- Top draft pick: David Price
- Picked by: Tampa Bay Devil Rays

Regular season
- Season MVP: AL: Alex Rodriguez (NYY); NL: Jimmy Rollins (PHI)

Postseason
- AL champions: Boston Red Sox
- AL runners-up: Cleveland Indians
- NL champions: Colorado Rockies
- NL runners-up: Arizona Diamondbacks

World Series
- Champions: Boston Red Sox
- Runners-up: Colorado Rockies
- World Series MVP: Mike Lowell (BOS)

MLB seasons
- ← 2006 2008 →

Locations of AL teams for the 2005–2007 MLB seasons
West Central East
Locations of NL teams for the 2006–2007 MLB seasons
West Central East

The 2007 Major League Baseball season began on April 1 with a rematch of the 2006 National League Championship Series; the St. Louis Cardinals and New York Mets played the first game of the season at Busch Stadium in St. Louis, Missouri, which was won by the Mets, 6–1. The regular season concluded with seven teams entering the postseason who had failed to reach the 2006 playoffs including all National League teams, with only the New York Yankees returning; a dramatic one-game playoff between the Colorado Rockies and San Diego Padres; and the largest September collapse for a leading team in baseball history, with the Mets squandering a 7-game lead with 17 to play, losing on the final day of the regular season, and the Philadelphia Phillies capturing the National League East for the first time since 1993. The season ended on October 28, with the Boston Red Sox sweeping the World Series over the Rockies, four games to zero.

A special exhibition game known as the "Civil Rights Game" was played on March 31 in AutoZone Park in Memphis, Tennessee, between the Cardinals and the Cleveland Indians to celebrate the history of civil rights in the United States. The 2007 season commemorates the 60th anniversary of Jackie Robinson's entry into the game, breaking the color barrier.

For the fourth consecutive season, MLB regular season attendance increased by comparison with the previous year. In 2007, an all-time attendance record of 79,502,524 (32,785 per game) was set.

== Rule change ==
The 2007 season saw the following rule change:

- Any game that was relocated to another city, saw the original home team still bat in the bottom of the inning, even if the relocated city was the original away team.

== Standings ==
=== American League ===
AL East
| Team | W | L | Pct. | GB | Home | Road |
|---|---|---|---|---|---|---|
| ^{(1)} Boston Red Sox | 96 | 66 | .593 | — | 51‍–‍30 | 45‍–‍36 |
| ^{(4)} New York Yankees | 94 | 68 | .580 | 2 | 52‍–‍29 | 42‍–‍39 |
| Toronto Blue Jays | 83 | 79 | .512 | 13 | 49‍–‍32 | 34‍–‍47 |
| Baltimore Orioles | 69 | 93 | .426 | 27 | 35‍–‍46 | 34‍–‍47 |
| Tampa Bay Devil Rays | 66 | 96 | .407 | 30 | 37‍–‍44 | 29‍–‍52 |

AL Central
| Team | W | L | Pct. | GB | Home | Road |
|---|---|---|---|---|---|---|
| ^{(2)} Cleveland Indians | 96 | 66 | .593 | — | 51‍–‍29 | 45‍–‍37 |
| Detroit Tigers | 88 | 74 | .543 | 8 | 45‍–‍36 | 43‍–‍38 |
| Minnesota Twins | 79 | 83 | .488 | 17 | 41‍–‍40 | 38‍–‍43 |
| Chicago White Sox | 72 | 90 | .444 | 24 | 38‍–‍43 | 34‍–‍47 |
| Kansas City Royals | 69 | 93 | .426 | 27 | 35‍–‍46 | 34‍–‍47 |

AL West
| Team | W | L | Pct. | GB | Home | Road |
|---|---|---|---|---|---|---|
| ^{(3)} Los Angeles Angels | 94 | 68 | .580 | — | 54‍–‍27 | 40‍–‍41 |
| Seattle Mariners | 88 | 74 | .543 | 6 | 49‍–‍33 | 39‍–‍41 |
| Oakland Athletics | 76 | 86 | .469 | 18 | 40‍–‍41 | 36‍–‍45 |
| Texas Rangers | 75 | 87 | .463 | 19 | 47‍–‍34 | 28‍–‍53 |

=== National League ===
NL East
| Team | W | L | Pct. | GB | Home | Road |
|---|---|---|---|---|---|---|
| ^{(2)} Philadelphia Phillies | 89 | 73 | .549 | — | 47‍–‍34 | 42‍–‍39 |
| New York Mets | 88 | 74 | .543 | 1 | 41‍–‍40 | 47‍–‍34 |
| Atlanta Braves | 84 | 78 | .519 | 5 | 44‍–‍37 | 40‍–‍41 |
| Washington Nationals | 73 | 89 | .451 | 16 | 40‍–‍41 | 33‍–‍48 |
| Florida Marlins | 71 | 91 | .438 | 18 | 36‍–‍45 | 35‍–‍46 |

NL Central
| Team | W | L | Pct. | GB | Home | Road |
|---|---|---|---|---|---|---|
| ^{(3)} Chicago Cubs | 85 | 77 | .525 | — | 44‍–‍37 | 41‍–‍40 |
| Milwaukee Brewers | 83 | 79 | .512 | 2 | 51‍–‍30 | 32‍–‍49 |
| St. Louis Cardinals | 78 | 84 | .481 | 7 | 43‍–‍38 | 35‍–‍46 |
| Houston Astros | 73 | 89 | .451 | 12 | 42‍–‍39 | 31‍–‍50 |
| Cincinnati Reds | 72 | 90 | .444 | 13 | 39‍–‍42 | 33‍–‍48 |
| Pittsburgh Pirates | 68 | 94 | .420 | 17 | 37‍–‍44 | 31‍–‍50 |

NL West
| Team | W | L | Pct. | GB | Home | Road |
|---|---|---|---|---|---|---|
| ^{(1)} Arizona Diamondbacks | 90 | 72 | .556 | — | 50‍–‍31 | 40‍–‍41 |
| ^{(4)} Colorado Rockies | 90 | 73 | .552 | ½ | 51‍–‍31 | 39‍–‍42 |
| San Diego Padres | 89 | 74 | .546 | 1½ | 47‍–‍34 | 42‍–‍40 |
| Los Angeles Dodgers | 82 | 80 | .506 | 8 | 43‍–‍38 | 39‍–‍42 |
| San Francisco Giants | 71 | 91 | .438 | 19 | 39‍–‍42 | 32‍–‍49 |

- The Colorado Rockies defeated the San Diego Padres in a one-game playoff to earn the NL Wild Card.

== Postseason ==
=== Bracket ===
Division Series (ALDS, NLDS)
1 | Boston | 3
3 | LA Angels | 0
American League
2 | Cleveland | 3
4 | NY Yankees | 1
1 | Arizona | 3
3 | Chicago Cubs | 0
National League
2 | Philadelphia | 0
4 | Colorado | 3

League Championship Series (NLCS, ALCS)
1 | Boston | 4
2 | Cleveland | 3
1 | Arizona | 0
4 | Colorado | 4

World Series
AL1 | Boston | 4
NL4 | Colorado | 0

Note: Two teams in the same division could not meet in the division series.

== League leaders ==
=== American League ===
Batting leaders
| Stat | Player | Total |
|---|---|---|
| AVG | Magglio Ordóñez (DET) | .363 |
| OPS | Alex Rodriguez (NYY) | 1.067 |
| HR | Alex Rodriguez (NYY) | 54 |
| RBI | Alex Rodriguez (NYY) | 156 |
| R | Alex Rodriguez (NYY) | 143 |
| H | Ichiro Suzuki (SEA) | 238 |
| SB | Carl Crawford (TB); Brian Roberts (BAL) | 50 |

Pitching leaders
| Stat | Player | Total |
|---|---|---|
| W | Josh Beckett (BOS) | 20 |
| L | Daniel Cabrera (BAL) | 18 |
| ERA | John Lackey (LAA) | 3.01 |
| K | Scott Kazmir (TB) | 239 |
| IP | CC Sabathia (CLE) | 241 |
| SV | Joe Borowski (CLE) | 45 |
| WHIP | Johan Santana (MIN) | 1.073 |

=== National League ===
Batting leaders
| Stat | Player | Total |
|---|---|---|
| AVG | Matt Holliday (COL) | .340 |
| OPS | Chipper Jones (ATL) | 1.029 |
| HR | Prince Fielder (MIL) | 50 |
| RBI | Matt Holliday (COL) | 137 |
| R | Jimmy Rollins (PHI) | 139 |
| H | Matt Holliday (COL) | 216 |
| SB | José Reyes (NYM) | 78 |

Pitching leaders
| Stat | Player | Total |
|---|---|---|
| W | Jake Peavy (SD) | 19 |
| L | Kip Wells (STL) | 17 |
| ERA | Jake Peavy (SD) | 2.54 |
| K | Jake Peavy (SD) | 240 |
| IP | Brandon Webb (AZ) | 236.1 |
| SV | José Valverde (AZ) | 47 |
| WHIP | Jake Peavy (SD) | 1.061 |

== Accomplishments ==
=== Barry Bonds surpasses Hank Aaron ===
Barry Bonds, left fielder for the San Francisco Giants, surpassed Hank Aaron as the all-time home run leader in Major League Baseball history with his 756th career home run off Mike Bacsik of the Washington Nationals in the fifth inning of their game August 7 at AT&T Park in San Francisco, California. The 3–2 pitch with one out and nobody on base was hit at 8:51 PM US PDT and according to hittrackeronline.com was estimated to have gone 422 feet. However, the Nationals came back and won the game, 8–6. Through his final home game (and last game of the season), on September 26, Bonds has hit 762 home runs.

The baseball that was hit for the record was caught by Mets fan Matt Murphy, who put the ball up for auction online. The winning bidder was fashion designer Marc Ecko, who purchased the baseball for $752,467 (US) and let fans decide what to do with it in an internet poll. Options included donating the ball to the Baseball Hall of Fame as-is, donating it marked with an asterisk (reflecting the widely held belief that Bonds used performance-enhancing drugs to break the record), or sending the baseball into space. The vote decided that an asterisk would be added, and the ball donated to Cooperstown. In an interview that aired on MSNBC's Countdown with Keith Olbermann on November 1 and 2, Bonds stated to interviewer Jim Gray that if the ball were to be put on display with the asterisk, he would boycott his own Hall of Fame induction if he were elected.

=== Other career milestones ===
- Ben Broussard of the Seattle Mariners became the fourth player in Major League history to hit three career grand slams as a pinch-hitter on April 21 in a 7–6 loss to the Los Angeles Angels of Anaheim.
- John Smoltz, right-handed pitcher for the Atlanta Braves earned his 200th win on May 24, defeating the New York Mets and longtime teammate Tom Glavine at Turner Field in Atlanta.
- Roy Halladay, right-handed pitcher for the Toronto Blue Jays, earned his 100th win on May 31 against the Chicago White Sox at Rogers Centre in Toronto, Ontario, Canada.
- Trevor Hoffman, a closer for the San Diego Padres, became the first pitcher in Major League history to earn his 500th career save on June 6 against the Los Angeles Dodgers at Petco Park in San Diego, California.
- Mark Buehrle, left-handed pitcher for the Chicago White Sox, earned his 100th win on June 10 against the Houston Astros at U.S. Cellular Field in Chicago.
- Sammy Sosa, right fielder for the Texas Rangers, hit his 600th career home run on June 20 against the Chicago Cubs at Rangers Ballpark in Arlington in Arlington, Texas. Sosa became the fifth player in Major League history to hit 600 career home runs and the second to hit his 600th career home run against his former team; in 2002, Barry Bonds hit his 600th home run against his former team, the Pittsburgh Pirates.
- Ryan Howard, first baseman for the Philadelphia Phillies, hit his 100th career home run on June 27 against the Cincinnati Reds at Citizens Bank Park in Philadelphia. He accomplished this in his 325th career game, becoming the fastest player in Major League Baseball history to reach this milestone. Howard also set a dubious record September 27, when he struck out against the Braves' John Smoltz, whiffing for the 196th time in a season. He ended the season with 199 strikeouts, a new record.
- Frank Thomas, the Toronto Blue Jays' designated hitter, hit his 500th career home run on June 28 against the Minnesota Twins at the Hubert H. Humphrey Metrodome in Minneapolis, Minnesota, against Carlos Silva in the first inning. He is the 21st player to reach this milestone. The Metrodome was also the site of his first home run as a member of the Chicago White Sox.
- Craig Biggio, second baseman for the Houston Astros, got his 3,000th career hit on June 28 against the Colorado Rockies at Minute Maid Park in Houston, Texas. Biggio was 5-for-6 in the game and was thrown out at second on his 3000th hit. Biggio became the 27th member of the 3,000 hit club, and is one of only nine players to get all 3,000 hits with one team. Biggio announced later in the season that he would retire following the completion of the season, finishing his career with 3,060 hits.
- Roger Clemens, pitcher for the New York Yankees, earned his 350th career win on July 2 against the Minnesota Twins at Yankee Stadium in The Bronx, New York. Clemens became the eighth pitcher to reach that mark.
- Alex Rodriguez, third baseman for the New York Yankees, hit his 500th career home run on August 4 against the Kansas City Royals at Yankee Stadium. He is the 22nd player to reach this milestone. At 32 years, 8 days of age, he became the youngest player to reach the 500-homer mark.
- Left-handed pitcher Tom Glavine of the New York Mets, earned his 300th career win against the Chicago Cubs at Wrigley Field on August 5 in front of a nationwide audience on ESPN's Sunday Night Baseball. Glavine became the fifth left-handed pitcher to win 300 games, the first since Steve Carlton in 1983, and the 23rd pitcher to win 300.
- Greg Maddux of the San Diego Padres became the first pitcher in history to record at least 10 wins in 20 consecutive seasons in the Padres' 14–3 defeat of the Phillies at Citizens Bank Park in Philadelphia, Pennsylvania, on August 24. The game also marked Maddux's 700th career start.
- Right-handed pitcher Pedro Martínez of the New York Mets became the 15th pitcher in history to record his 3,000th career strikeout when he dismissed his opposing pitcher, Aaron Harang, in the second inning of the Mets' 10–4 win over the Cincinnati Reds on September 3 at Great American Ball Park in Cincinnati. The game was the first MLB appearance of Martínez after rotator cuff surgery immediately after the end of the 2006 season.
- Todd Jones, the Detroit Tigers' right-handed closer, earned his 300th career save September 16 against the Minnesota Twins.
- Chicago White Sox designated hitter Jim Thome hit a two-run walk-off home run on September 16 for his 500th career home run at U.S. Cellular Field in Chicago, leading the White Sox to a 9–7 win over the Los Angeles Angels, making the 2007 season the first in which three players hit their 500th homer. He is the 23rd player to reach this milestone. It was also the first time in MLB history that a player reached the 500-homer mark with a walk-off homer.
- Kenny Rogers, Detroit Tigers left-handed pitcher, recorded his 91st career pickoff against Jason Michaels of the Cleveland Indians on September 17. This tied him with Mark Langston for most all-time.
- Andy Pettitte, New York Yankees southpaw, recorded his 200th career win against the Baltimore Orioles on September 19.
- C.C. Sabathia, a left-handed pitcher for the Cleveland Indians won his 100th game and struck out his 1000th batter for the Tribe, becoming the youngest pitcher to do so since Greg Maddux.

=== Team milestones ===
- The Chicago Cubs of the National League recorded their 10,000th win in all major leagues against the Atlanta Braves on June 3, at Wrigley Field in Chicago. They became the second team to reach this mark after the New York/San Francisco Giants were the first. However, this tally includes 77 wins gained during Chicago's years in the National Association (1871, 1874 and 1875). These wins are not considered official by Major League Baseball. Through 2007, the Cubs have 9,985 official wins.
- The Philadelphia Phillies of the National League, recorded their 10,000th loss, a 10–2 loss to the St. Louis Cardinals on July 15, at Citizens Bank Park in Philadelphia, Pennsylvania. They became the first team in the four major sports leagues (MLB, NHL, NFL, and NBA) to accomplish this. However, Major League Baseball's season, by number of games, is almost twice as long as the NHL and NBA seasons and ten times longer than the NFL season. Also, the Phillies have existed since 1883, more than 30 years longer than any of the other major North American leagues (NHL: 1917, NFL: 1920, NBA: 1946).
- The Texas Rangers of the American League scored 30 runs in a 30–3 rout of the Baltimore Orioles on August 22, at Oriole Park at Camden Yards in Baltimore, Maryland. The Rangers set both a new American League and the modern Major League (post-1900) record for runs scored in a game, and became the first team since the Chicago Colts scored 36 runs against the Louisville Colonels in 1897 to score at least 30 runs in a game. The previous record was 29, first set by the Boston Red Sox in 1950 at Fenway Park against the Orioles' predecessors, the St. Louis Browns, and equaled at Municipal Stadium in Kansas City, Missouri, in 1955 by the Chicago White Sox against the Kansas City Athletics, who had moved from Philadelphia the year before. The Rangers won the nightcap, 9–7 and extended the newly-set record for most runs in a doubleheader in the American League to 39.
- The Colorado Rockies, winners of the NL wild-card, won their first-ever playoff series by sweeping the Philadelphia Phillies in the NLDS. The Rockies then swept the Arizona Diamondbacks in the NLCS to claim their first-ever National League championship.

=== Other accomplishments ===
==== No-hitters ====
Three no-hitters were pitched during the 2007 regular season. This is the most in a single season since the three pitched in 2001. All three no-hitters in 2007 were in the American League, which is the most in a single league since the record-tying 1991 season when the two leagues combined for seven no-hitters (4 AL, 3 NL).

- Mark Buehrle pitched a no-hitter on April 18 against the Texas Rangers at U.S. Cellular Field in Chicago. The only baserunner Buehrle allowed was Sammy Sosa who reached on a walk, but was picked off first base. Buehrle struck out eight batters, only throwing 106 pitches. It was the White Sox' first no-hitter since Wilson Álvarez threw one against the Baltimore Orioles on August 11, 1991, and the first Major League no-hitter since Florida Marlins pitcher Aníbal Sánchez threw one against the Arizona Diamondbacks on September 6, 2006, and the first home no-hitter for the White Sox since Joe Horlen accomplished the feat September 10, 1967, against the Detroit Tigers at the old Comiskey Park across the street from U.S. Cellular Field.
- Justin Verlander, a pitcher for the Detroit Tigers, pitched a no-hitter in an interleague game on June 12 against the Milwaukee Brewers at Comerica Park in Detroit, Michigan. The reigning Rookie of the Year walked four batters and struck out a career high 12 while throwing only 120 pitches. The no-hitter was the Tigers' first since Jack Morris turned the trick against the Chicago White Sox on April 7, 1984, and came a day after the four-year anniversary of the last interleague no-hitter; on June 11, 2003, the Houston Astros threw a combined no-hitter at Yankee Stadium against the New York Yankees. Verlander's no-hitter was the first thrown by a Tiger at home since Virgil Trucks accomplished the feat at Briggs Stadium on May 15, 1952, against the Washington Senators. This was also the first no-hitter ever at Comerica Park.
- Clay Buchholz, a rookie pitcher for the Boston Red Sox, pitched a no-hitter on September 1 against the Baltimore Orioles at Fenway Park in Boston, Massachusetts, during his second career Major League appearance. It was the 17th no-hitter in Boston Red Sox history, and the first Boston rookie to throw one. He became only the second player to throw one in his second career game. On the day the rosters expanded, Buchholz was recalled from Triple-A to start the game because Tim Wakefield was scratched due to a bad back. Buchholz improved to 2–0 for his career. Ironically, in his pre-game interview, manager Terry Francona had said "Even if he throws a no-hitter he's still going back to the minors." Buchholz remained on the active roster for the rest of the regular season.

==== Fielding ====
- Troy Tulowitzki, a shortstop for the Colorado Rockies, turned an unassisted triple play on April 29 against the Atlanta Braves at Coors Field in Denver, Colorado. The play occurred during the 7th inning of a 9–7 victory. Tulowitzki became the 13th player in Major League Baseball history to accomplish this feat.
- Plácido Polanco, a second baseman for the Detroit Tigers, set a new Major League record by playing in his 144th consecutive errorless game on August 13, in a 7–2 loss to the Oakland Athletics. Polanco appeared to have his streak snapped at 147 games when he was charged with an error in the first inning of the August 24 game vs. the New York Yankees. However, the next day, after conferring with the umpiring crew, the official scorer determined the error was instead charged to first baseman Marcus Thames. This extended the streak to 149 games. Polanco also broke the record for consecutive chances without an error by a second baseman July 31. He passed Luis Castillo's mark of 647. Polanco finished the 2007 season without making an error, thereby becoming the first everyday second baseman in MLB history to play an entire season without committing an error.

==== Hitting ====
- On April 22, Boston Red Sox players Manny Ramírez (left fielder), J. D. Drew (right fielder), Mike Lowell (third baseman) and Jason Varitek (catcher) hit four consecutive home runs in a game against the New York Yankees at Fenway Park. This marked the fifth time in Major League history that this feat was accomplished. All four home runs were hit off of Chase Wright in the 3rd inning.
- Chone Figgins, third baseman for the Los Angeles Angels, went 6-for-6 on June 18 against the Houston Astros at Angel Stadium of Anaheim in Anaheim, California. Figgins drove in the game-winning run on a triple in the ninth inning to win the game 10–9. He became the second player in team history to go 6-for-6; then-California Angels outfielder Garret Anderson accomplished this feat on September 27, 1996. Figgins also became the first player in Major League history to go 6-for-6 with a walk-off hit in a regulation nine-inning game.
- Ichiro Suzuki, the center fielder for the Seattle Mariners, hit the first Inside-the-park home run in All-Star Game history on July 10 for the American League against the National League at AT&T Park in San Francisco. Even though the game doesn't count towards a player's career statistics, it was Ichiro's first career inside-the-park home run.
- Willie Harris, a left fielder for the Atlanta Braves, went 6-for-6 on July 21 at Turner Field as the Braves routed the St. Louis Cardinals, 14–6. He hit two triples with six RBIs during the night, both career-highs. Harris became the seventh player in franchise history to go 6-for-6 and the fourth player in Major League history since 1950 to go 6-for-6 with 6 RBIs.
- Garret Anderson, a left fielder for the Los Angeles Angels, set a franchise record and became the first player since April 2005 to get 10 RBIs in a game on August 21 at Angel Stadium of Anaheim, leading the Angels to an 18–9 victory over the New York Yankees. Anderson broke the Angels' franchise record for RBIs in a game, previously set by his teammate, Vladimir Guerrero, who had nine RBIs on June 2, 2004, against the Boston Red Sox. Anderson also became the first player since Alex Rodriguez to hit 10 RBIs in a game, doing so on April 26, 2005, ironically in a game against the Angels at Yankee Stadium. The 10 RBIs also was a career-high, eclipsing his previous mark of seven which he set on September 5, 2002, in an Angels' 10–1 victory over the Tampa Bay Devil Rays.
- On September 9, the Milwaukee Brewers became the first team in recorded Major League history to open a game with three consecutive home runs. The three home runs were hit in order by Rickie Weeks, J. J. Hardy, and Ryan Braun at Great American Ball Park in Cincinnati. Reds pitcher Phil Dumatrait notched the loss after submitting the three home runs in only 10 pitches.
- Prince Fielder of the Milwaukee Brewers became the youngest player in Major League Baseball history to hit 50 home runs in a season. Prince hit his record-breaking home run at the age of 23 years, 4 months, and 18 days. His father, Cecil Fielder, hit 50 home runs in 1990 with the Tigers.
- Two new members of the 20–20–20–20 club (20 doubles, 20 triples, 20 home runs and 20 stolen bases) were entered in 2007. Curtis Granderson, Detroit Tigers center fielder, was the first to join (and third overall) this exclusive group when he stole his 20th base of the 2007 season, doing so September 9. On September 30, the last scheduled day of the regular season, Philadelphia Phillies shortstop Jimmy Rollins joined Granderson as the fourth player to accomplish this feat by hitting his 20th triple of the 2007 season.
- Kazuo Matsui hit his first ever grand slam and became the second person in MLB history to do so in the post-season.

==== Other accomplishments ====
- Bobby Cox, manager of the Atlanta Braves was ejected from his 132nd game on August 14 against the San Francisco Giants, surpassing John McGraw of the New York Giants for the all-time record.
- Trever Miller, a relief pitcher for the Houston Astros, shattered Scott Aldred's record for most appearances in a season without a win or a loss, with 76. The previous record was 48, set by Aldred in 1998 as a member of the Tampa Bay Devil Rays.

== All-Star game ==
On July 10, 2007, at AT&T Park in San Francisco, the American League defeated the National League by a score of 5–4. The victory was the tenth consecutive (excluding the 2002 tie) for the AL, and their eleven-game unbeaten streak matches only the NL's streak from 1972 to 1982 in All-Star history.

== Ceremonial games ==
=== Jackie Robinson ===
On April 15, Major League Baseball celebrated the sixtieth anniversary of the debut of Jackie Robinson at Ebbets Field in Brooklyn, breaking the color barrier. Cincinnati Reds outfielder Ken Griffey Jr. asked Robinson's widow, Rachel, and commissioner Bud Selig for permission to wear Robinson's number 42 in honor of him. He was granted permission, and Selig later said that any player who wanted to wear number 42 on his jersey could. The jersey was worn without the players' name on the back, as was the case when Robinson played with the Brooklyn Dodgers. All jerseys that were worn were auctioned off with all the proceeds donated to the Jackie Robinson Foundation, an organization which awards scholarships to African-American high school graduates to further themselves in colleges academically.

The Dodgers, Cardinals, and Brewers elected to have the entire team wear number 42 in his honor. The Pittsburgh Pirates, Phillies, and Astros were also scheduled to share that honor, but their games were postponed due to rain. The Phillies and Astros honored Robinson on April 23 when they made up their postponed game as originally planned, while the Pirates waited until April 27 to honor Robinson by wearing #42 as a team against the Reds.

=== Larry Doby ===
On August 10, the Cleveland Indians paid tribute to Larry Doby, the first African-American to play in the American League at Jacobs Field in Cleveland, Ohio. Every player on the Indians wore number 14, the number Doby wore during his career with the Indians.

== Farewells ==
The Nationals played their final game at Robert F. Kennedy Stadium on September 23, beating the Phillies 5–3. The team's new home, Nationals Park, formally opened on March 30, 2008.

The Tampa Bay franchise played its last season as the Devil Rays. In 2008, the name was shortened to Tampa Bay Rays.

=== Retiring players ===
Barry Bonds

Roger Clemens

Craig Biggio
Biggio joined the 3,000 hit club during the 2007 season, and became the first player to be called out in the same play that they got their 3000th hit. He was tagged out while trying to stretch his hit into a double. He announced his retirement on July 24, about a month after achieving the milestone. He finished his career with 668 doubles, good for 5th all-time at the time he retired. In the penultimate game of his career, on September 29, he was brought in as a catcher, playing the position for the first time in 15 years.

Jeff Conine
Conine, then of the New York Mets, announced his retirement on September 20, right before their last road trip to visit the Florida Marlins. The Marlins, fans of which refer to him as "Mr. Marlin", honored him for his contribution to their two World Series titles in 1997 and 2003. Ironically, losses to the Marlins contributed to the Mets failing to make the playoffs.

Mike Lieberthal

Shawn Green

== Awards ==
Baseball Writers' Association of America Awards
| BBWAA Award | National League | American League |
|---|---|---|
| Rookie of the Year | Ryan Braun (MIL) | Dustin Pedroia (BOS) |
| Cy Young Award | Jake Peavy (SD) | CC Sabathia (CLE) |
| Manager of the Year | Bob Melvin (AZ) | Eric Wedge (CLE) |
| Most Valuable Player | Jimmy Rollins (PHI) | Alex Rodriguez (NYY) |
Gold Glove Awards
| Position | National League | American League |
| Pitcher | Greg Maddux (SD) | Johan Santana (MIN) |
| Catcher | Russell Martin (LAD) | Iván Rodríguez (DET) |
| 1st Base | Derrek Lee (CHC) | Kevin Youkilis (BOS) |
| 2nd Base | Orlando Hudson (AZ) | Plácido Polanco (DET) |
| 3rd Base | David Wright (NYM) | Adrián Beltré (SEA) |
| Shortstop | Jimmy Rollins (PHI) | Orlando Cabrera (LAA) |
| Outfield | Carlos Beltrán (NYM); Jeff Francoeur (ATL); Andruw Jones (ATL); Aaron Rowand (PHI) | Torii Hunter (MIN); Grady Sizemore (CLE); Ichiro Suzuki (SEA) |
Silver Slugger Awards
| Position | National League | American League |
| Pitcher/Designated Hitter | Micah Owings (AZ) | David Ortiz (BOS) |
| Catcher | Russell Martin (LAD) | Jorge Posada (NYY) |
| 1st Base | Prince Fielder (MIL) | Carlos Peña (TB) |
| 2nd Base | Chase Utley (PHI) | Plácido Polanco (DET) |
| 3rd Base | David Wright (NYM) | Alex Rodriguez (NYY) |
| Shortstop | Jimmy Rollins (PHI) | Derek Jeter (NYY) |
| Outfield | Carlos Beltrán (NYM); Matt Holliday (COL); Carlos Lee (HOU) | Vladimir Guerrero (LAA); Magglio Ordóñez (DET); Ichiro Suzuki (SEA) |

=== Other awards ===
- Comeback Players of the Year: Carlos Peña (First baseman, TB, American); Dmitri Young (First baseman, WSH, National).
- Edgar Martínez Award (Best designated hitter): David Ortiz (BOS)
- Hank Aaron Award: Alex Rodriguez (NYY, American); Prince Fielder (MIL, National).
- Roberto Clemente Award (Humanitarian): Craig Biggio (HOU).
- Rolaids Relief Man Award: J. J. Putz (SEA, American); José Valverde (AZ, National).
- Delivery Man of the Year (Best Reliever): Jonathan Papelbon (BOS).
- Warren Spahn Award (Best left-handed pitcher): CC Sabathia (CLE)
- Clutch Performer of the Year: Alex Rodriguez (NYY).

=== Player of the Month ===
| Month | American League | National League |
|---|---|---|
| April | Alex Rodriguez | José Reyes |
| May | Justin Morneau | Prince Fielder |
| June | Alex Rodriguez | Alfonso Soriano |
| July | Hideki Matsui | Ryan Braun |
| August | Magglio Ordóñez | Mark Teixeira |
| September | David Ortiz | Matt Holliday |

=== Pitcher of the Month ===
| Month | American League | National League |
|---|---|---|
| April | Roy Halladay | John Maine |
| May | Dan Haren | Jake Peavy |
| June | J. J. Putz | Ben Sheets |
| July | Érik Bédard | Carlos Zambrano |
| August | Andy Pettitte | Jake Peavy |
| September | Fausto Carmona | Jake Peavy |

=== Rookie of the Month ===
| Month | American League | National League |
|---|---|---|
| April | Hideki Okajima | Josh Hamilton |
| May | Dustin Pedroia | Hunter Pence |
| June | Brian Bannister | Ryan Braun |
| July | Billy Butler | Ryan Braun |
| August | Brian Bannister | Troy Tulowitzki |
| September | Jacoby Ellsbury | James Loney |

== Home field attendance and payroll ==
| Team name | Wins | %± | Home attendance | %± | Per game | Est. payroll | %± |
|---|---|---|---|---|---|---|---|
| New York Yankees | 94 | −3.1% | 4,271,083 | 0.5% | 52,729 | $207,039,045 | 6.4% |
| Los Angeles Dodgers | 82 | −6.8% | 3,857,036 | 2.6% | 47,618 | $108,454,524 | 10.2% |
| New York Mets | 88 | −9.3% | 3,853,955 | 14.0% | 47,580 | $116,181,663 | 14.4% |
| St. Louis Cardinals | 78 | −6.0% | 3,552,180 | 4.3% | 43,854 | $90,286,823 | 1.6% |
| Los Angeles Angels of Anaheim | 94 | 5.6% | 3,365,632 | −1.2% | 41,551 | $109,251,333 | 5.6% |
| Chicago Cubs | 85 | 28.8% | 3,252,462 | 4.1% | 40,154 | $101,670,332 | 7.7% |
| San Francisco Giants | 71 | −6.6% | 3,223,215 | 3.0% | 39,793 | $90,219,056 | 0.2% |
| Philadelphia Phillies | 89 | 4.7% | 3,108,325 | 15.0% | 38,374 | $89,428,213 | 1.3% |
| Detroit Tigers | 88 | −7.4% | 3,047,133 | 17.4% | 37,619 | $95,180,369 | 15.2% |
| Houston Astros | 73 | −11.0% | 3,020,405 | −0.1% | 37,289 | $87,759,000 | −13.0% |
| Boston Red Sox | 96 | 11.6% | 2,970,755 | 1.4% | 36,676 | $143,026,214 | 19.1% |
| Milwaukee Brewers | 83 | 10.7% | 2,869,144 | 22.8% | 35,422 | $70,986,500 | 22.5% |
| San Diego Padres | 89 | 1.1% | 2,790,074 | 4.9% | 34,445 | $58,110,567 | −16.9% |
| Atlanta Braves | 84 | 6.3% | 2,745,207 | 7.6% | 33,891 | $87,290,833 | −3.2% |
| Chicago White Sox | 72 | −20.0% | 2,684,395 | −9.2% | 33,141 | $108,671,833 | 5.8% |
| Seattle Mariners | 88 | 12.8% | 2,672,223 | 7.7% | 32,588 | $106,460,833 | 21.0% |
| Colorado Rockies | 90 | 18.4% | 2,376,250 | 12.9% | 28,979 | $54,041,000 | 31.1% |
| Toronto Blue Jays | 83 | −4.6% | 2,360,644 | 2.5% | 29,144 | $81,942,800 | 14.8% |
| Texas Rangers | 75 | −6.3% | 2,353,862 | −1.5% | 29,060 | $68,643,675 | 0.6% |
| Arizona Diamondbacks | 90 | 18.4% | 2,325,249 | 11.2% | 28,707 | $52,067,546 | −13.2% |
| Minnesota Twins | 79 | −17.7% | 2,296,383 | 0.5% | 28,350 | $71,439,500 | 12.7% |
| Cleveland Indians | 96 | 23.1% | 2,275,912 | 13.9% | 28,449 | $61,673,267 | 10.1% |
| Baltimore Orioles | 69 | −1.4% | 2,164,822 | 0.5% | 26,726 | $93,174,808 | 28.4% |
| Cincinnati Reds | 72 | −10.0% | 2,058,593 | −3.6% | 25,415 | $68,524,980 | 12.5% |
| Washington Nationals | 73 | 2.8% | 1,943,812 | −9.7% | 23,998 | $36,947,500 | −41.5% |
| Oakland Athletics | 76 | −18.3% | 1,921,844 | −2.8% | 23,726 | $79,366,940 | 22.4% |
| Pittsburgh Pirates | 68 | 1.5% | 1,749,142 | −6.0% | 21,594 | $38,537,833 | −17.5% |
| Kansas City Royals | 69 | 11.3% | 1,616,867 | 17.8% | 19,961 | $67,691,500 | 41.9% |
| Tampa Bay Devil Rays | 66 | 8.2% | 1,387,603 | 1.4% | 17,131 | $24,623,500 | −29.5% |
| Florida Marlins | 71 | −9.0% | 1,370,511 | 17.7% | 16,920 | $30,507,000 | 107.9% |

== Apparel ==
=== Uniforms ===
- The Arizona Diamondbacks changed from purple, copper and turquoise to a modern Sedona Red, sand and black scheme, complete with re-colored primary and alternate logos, along with new scripts and sleeve insignia.
- The Chicago Cubs have restored player names to the back of their home jerseys and removed their blue alternate jersey.
- The Cincinnati Reds changed from pinstriped vests to traditional sleeve jerseys at home with scarlet soutache trim de-emphasizing black trim and a new early 20th-Century lettering and numbering font as well as the return of "Mr. Redleg", the 1950s sleeve patch/mascot supplanting the modern "Mr. Red".
- The Los Angeles Angels added a red alternate jersey.
- The Los Angeles Dodgers restored player names to the back of their jerseys and removed the white trim from their road uniforms.
- The Pittsburgh Pirates added a red alternate jersey to be worn on Friday nights, paying tribute to the city's "Redd Up" cleanup campaign. The lone exception was the April 27 game against the Cincinnati Reds when the team wore #42 in tribute to Jackie Robinson as stated above.

=== Commemorative patches ===
- The Atlanta Braves wore a patch remembering the lives of Johnny Sain and Lew Burdette, two players who were traded for each other in a deal in 1951 between the then-Boston Braves and the New York Yankees. The patch read their initials ("JS" on the left, "LB" on the right) between the number they shared, "33." Both died during the offseason.
- The Boston Red Sox wore their green St. Patrick's Day uniform on April 20 against the Yankees in tribute to Boston Celtics longtime coach and president Red Auerbach.
- The Florida Marlins wore a patch celebrating the 10th anniversary of their 1997 World Series championship.
- The Milwaukee Brewers, who since 1998 have played in the National League, wore a patch celebrating the 25th anniversary of their 1982 American League championship. The patch, however, was only worn on their Friday night retro uniforms.
- The Minnesota Twins wore a black armband during their first home stand and a patch in memory of Herb Carneal, their radio play-by-play announcer from 1962 until 2006, who died on April 1, 2007, for their first home stand. They then switched to a red circular patch featuring an old-style microphone and the name "Herb."
- The New York Yankees wore a black armband in memory of Cory Lidle, who was killed in a plane crash in Manhattan on October 11, 2006. They added the retired #10 above the armband in memory of longtime player and announcer Phil Rizzuto, who died on August 14.
- The Philadelphia Phillies wore a black patch with "VUK" written in white in memory of longtime team player, coach and scout John Vukovich, who died during spring training.
- The San Francisco Giants wore two patches for the 2007 season:
  - An alternate version of the 2007 All-Star Game logo; being the host team of the 2007 All-Star Game.
  - Following the death of former player Rod Beck, they added a black square with "BECK 47" in white lettering.
- The Seattle Mariners wore a patch celebrating their 30th anniversary, featuring their two home stadiums they have played in, the Kingdome and Safeco Field, against the background of Mount Rainier and the Space Needle.
- The St. Louis Cardinals wore two patches for the 2007 season:
  - They wore a patch celebrating their 2006 World Series victory over the Detroit Tigers on their home uniforms;
  - Following the death of pitcher Josh Hancock, they added a black "32" patch on their jerseys in his memory.
- The Tampa Bay Devil Rays wore a patch celebrating the franchise's 10th season of existence.
- The Toronto Blue Jays wore a patch in black with a white "SP" starting on August 20 in remembrance of Sam Pollock, a legendary NHL general manager most notably with the Montreal Canadiens who died on August 15. Pollack had served as the Jays' Chairman and CEO from 1995 to 2000.
- The Washington Nationals wore a patch for their last home stand, commemorating the final few games at RFK Stadium.

== Josh Hancock ==
Josh Hancock, a relief pitcher with the St. Louis Cardinals, died on April 29 in a car accident outside St. Louis, Missouri. The 29-year-old pitcher was killed within a couple of minutes after impact when the SUV he was driving crashed into a towing vehicle on Interstate 64. This marks the second time in five years that a Cardinals pitcher lost his life before a game, the other being Darryl Kile, who died suddenly on June 22, 2002. The team postponed their game scheduled for later that day against the Chicago Cubs to pay respect to Hancock.

A police report revealed that Hancock was intoxicated at the time of his fatal accident with a blood-alcohol level of 0.157, nearly double the legal limit in Missouri. Police also found 8.55 grams of marijuana along with a glass smoking pipe in his vehicle, although toxicology tests later proved no drugs were in his system except alcohol. In addition, Hancock was talking on a cell phone when the accident occurred and was not wearing a seatbelt. An accident reconstruction team determined that Hancock was driving 68 mph in a 55 mph zone.

== Managers ==
=== American League ===
| Team | Manager | Comments |
|---|---|---|
| Baltimore Orioles | Dave Trembley | Sam Perlozzo was fired during the season; Trembley signed an extension through the 2008 season. |
| Boston Red Sox | Terry Francona | Won World Series |
| Chicago White Sox | Ozzie Guillén | |
| Cleveland Indians | Eric Wedge | |
| Detroit Tigers | Jim Leyland | |
| Kansas City Royals | Buddy Bell | Announced resignation effective at end of 2007 season; Trey Hillman named new manager for 2008. |
| Los Angeles Angels | Mike Scioscia | |
| Minnesota Twins | Ron Gardenhire | |
| New York Yankees | Joe Torre | Torre rejected a one-year extension of his contract, which expired at the end of the 2007 season. Joe Girardi named new manager for 2008. |
| Oakland Athletics | Bob Geren | |
| Seattle Mariners | John McLaren | Mike Hargrove resigned during the season; McLaren will return for the 2008 season. |
| Tampa Bay Devil Rays | Joe Maddon | |
| Texas Rangers | Ron Washington | |
| Toronto Blue Jays | John Gibbons | |

=== National League ===
| Team | Manager | Comments |
|---|---|---|
| Arizona Diamondbacks | Bob Melvin | |
| Atlanta Braves | Bobby Cox | |
| Chicago Cubs | Lou Piniella | |
| Cincinnati Reds | Pete Mackanin | Jerry Narron was fired during the season; Dusty Baker takes over in 2008. |
| Colorado Rockies | Clint Hurdle | Won NL Pennant |
| Florida Marlins | Fredi González | |
| Houston Astros | Cecil Cooper | Phil Garner was fired during the season; Cooper will return for the 2008 season. |
| Los Angeles Dodgers | Grady Little | Little resigned after the season; Joe Torre named manager for 2008 on October 30. |
| Milwaukee Brewers | Ned Yost | |
| New York Mets | Willie Randolph | |
| Philadelphia Phillies | Charlie Manuel | |
| Pittsburgh Pirates | Jim Tracy | Tracy was fired after the season ended: John Russell named manager November 5 for 2008 season. |
| St. Louis Cardinals | Tony La Russa | La Russa signed a new two-year contract October 22, through 2009. |
| San Diego Padres | Bud Black | |
| San Francisco Giants | Bruce Bochy | |
| Washington Nationals | Manny Acta | |

== Media coverage ==
This was the first season of Fox's new media agreement lasting through 2013. Fox Saturday Baseball expanded to the entire 26 weeks of the regular season, up from 18 under the previous contract. Fox also retained exclusive rights to televise the World Series and the All-Star Game. Fox would also get exclusive rights to televise the American League Championship Series in odd-numbered years, and the National League Championship Series in even-number years.

TBS also signed a deal lasting through 2013, As part of the contract, TBS relinquished its rights to air Atlanta Braves games nationally after the 2007 season, by separating WTBS (now WPCH) channel 17 from the TBS network, eventually rebranding as Peachtree TV on October 1, 2007. TBS also gained exclusive broadcast rights to the Division Series in both leagues, any tiebreaking games, the National League Championship Series in odd-numbered years, and the American League Championship Series in even-number years. Additionally, TBS gained the rights to a Sunday afternoon Game of the Week beginning in 2008.

ESPN continued to televise games on Sunday nights, Wednesday nights and other weeknights, but no longer any postseason games.

== See also ==
- 2007 in baseball
- 2007 Korea Professional Baseball season
- 2007 Nippon Professional Baseball season
