= Dimitri Vlachos - Castano =

Greek Goldwork embroiderer (born 1965)

- Δημήτρης Βλάχος
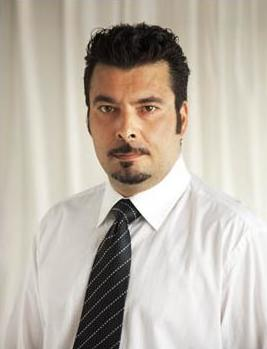
- Born: Dimitrios Vlachos; April 19, 1965 (age 60); Cephalonia, Greece
- Known for: Goldwork embroidery
- Spouse: Maria Varouktsi
- Website: gold-embroidery.com

Dimitri Vlachos - Castano (born 19 April 1965) is a Greek Goldwork embroiderer. This last “Syrmakesis” uses real materials from gold and silver, as it is mentioned by M. George N. Ekaterinidis PhD, Former Director of Research Folklore Centre of the Academy of Athens and Secretary of Greek Folklore Company. He was born in Greece and comes from Cephalonia, son of Thanassis Vlachos, or as more widely known Kastanis (Castano), from Lixouri and Marietta Milla from Grizata, Sami. During his adolescence, he showed a special interest in gold smithery & silver smithery, which he practised for a long time. In 1994, Dimitrios Vlachos - Castano gets with the Art of Gold Embroidery.

== Biography ==
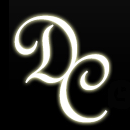
The artist's logo, his initials sparkling, Dimitri Castano

In 1994, Dimitri Vlachos - Castano met his compatriot by chance. Since then, he decided to devote his whole life to Goldwork. The cost was high since his passion for this art made him leave his business and sacrifice his personal life, even rest hours, in order to work for many years next to this man, his teacher of Goldwork embroidery. The method used by Dimitri Vlachos - Castano is identical to the method used by the first artist and inspirer of this art. The thin needle passes through the golden wire... it goes through the fabric in a surgical manner of unimaginable accuracy and realises the design that he had previously conceived himself. These smooth movements require excessive self-concentration. Such movements are repeated a million times, but always with the same attention because even the tiniest mistake may fatally lead to the disaster of the entire prior creation even if it is the last stitch. This does not only happen because it is very hard to correct it but also because the original must be absolutely perfect and nothing less! The tiniest mistake costs not only in very expensive material but in many hours of painful and hard work and also immense Jobean patience.

== Castano and recognition ==
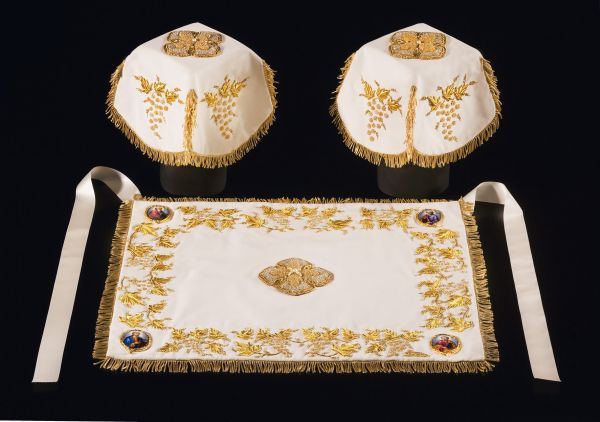
“Altar Cover and Covers set of the Chalice Veil of Panagia Evangelistria of Tinos” (2007 - 2008)

His works have become famous all over the world after their uniqueness was shown on all large Greek and international television networks: CNN, MEGA, ALPHA, are some of the media which brought out Goldwork and his rare works to the entire world. In 2003, the International TV Network CNN acknowledges Dimitrios Vlachos-Castano, after an exhaustive journalistic inquiry, as a unique artist in this field highlighting his important contribution in reviving Gold Embroidery. Moreover, his uniqueness lies in the fact that every gold-embroidered handicraft has a strictly unique design being always accompanied by the guarantees of the precious materials and the artist's certification. Dimitrios Vlachos - Castano, has not limited himself to making exclusively priestly motifs. He has taken Goldwork much further without denying though the art of Goldwork embroidery. In experimenting with various designs, he illustrated his concerns on new avant-garde motifs. The source of his inspiration is mostly nature. He always seeks to create oeuvres that could be compared in the future in perfection and magnificence to those rare treasures of this Art that today are exhibited in Museums all over the world. He embroiders unique wedding and evening dresses, accessories, such as a pair of shoes, handbags, belts. Up to 2008, Dimitrios Vlachos-Castano signed his works as ΔΒ, which are the initials of his name in Greek. Since 2009, his artistic signature CASTANO adorns all his embroidered handicrafts.

== Works ==
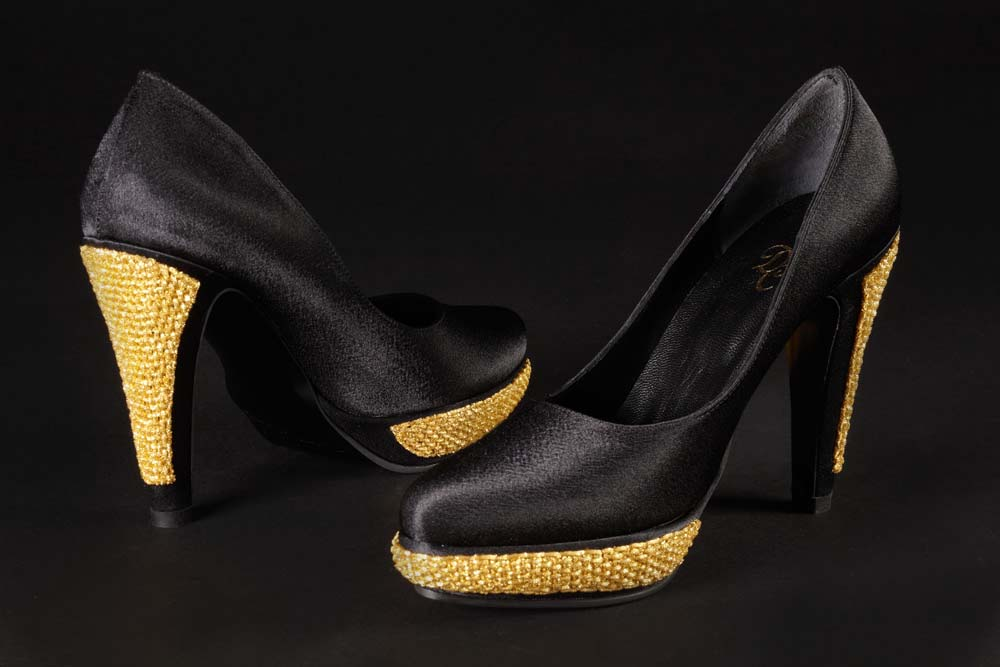
“Gold Embroidered Pair of Shoes” (September 2010)

- “Fours Ribbons of the Episcopal candlesticks” (November 2014) Fours Ribbons of the Episcopal candlesticks of the Monastery of Doxiariou in Mount Athos. They are the largest and the most notable Episcopal candlesticks of the Catholic.
- “The Cross” (February 2014) The Cross of the Monastery of Doxiariou in Mount Athos. This is a copy of the most important metalworking relic of the Monastery used to accompany the troops in campaigns during the 9th century AD.
- “Altar Cover and Covers set of the Chalice Veil of Panagia Evangelistria of Tinos” (2007 - 2008)
- “Shrine” (2006) an ecclesiastical vestment bound to decorate the stand of the miraculous icon of Virgin Mary (Panagia Evangelistria) of Tinos.
- “Cover of The Sacred Relic of Saint Gerasimos of Cephalonia” (2005) Dimitrios Vlachos-Castano, after a pilgrimage to Saint Gerasimos, felt the need to dedicate something unique and as valuable as His grace, as a humble offer, to the Saint and protector of the island of Cephalonia.
- “Byzantine Cross” (January 2013) of omophorion
- “Byzantine Cross” (June 2012) of omophorion
- “Flag of the Kingdom of Saudi Arabia” (November 2010)
- “Gold Embroidered Pair of Shoes” (September 2010)
- “Holy Qur’an” (April 2010)
- “Gold Embroidered Raptor” (March 2010) painting of dimensions 100 cm x 144 cm
- “Emblem of the Kingdom of Saudi Arabia” June 2009
- “Gold Embroidered Arabic Invitation” October 2009
- “Gold Embroidered Purse and gold embroidered pair of shoes (Black Peep Toe)” (July 2009 - August 2009)
- “Fire wedding dress” (June 2009)
- “Olive wedding dress” (September 2008)
