= Goldwork (embroidery) =

Embroidery with metal threads

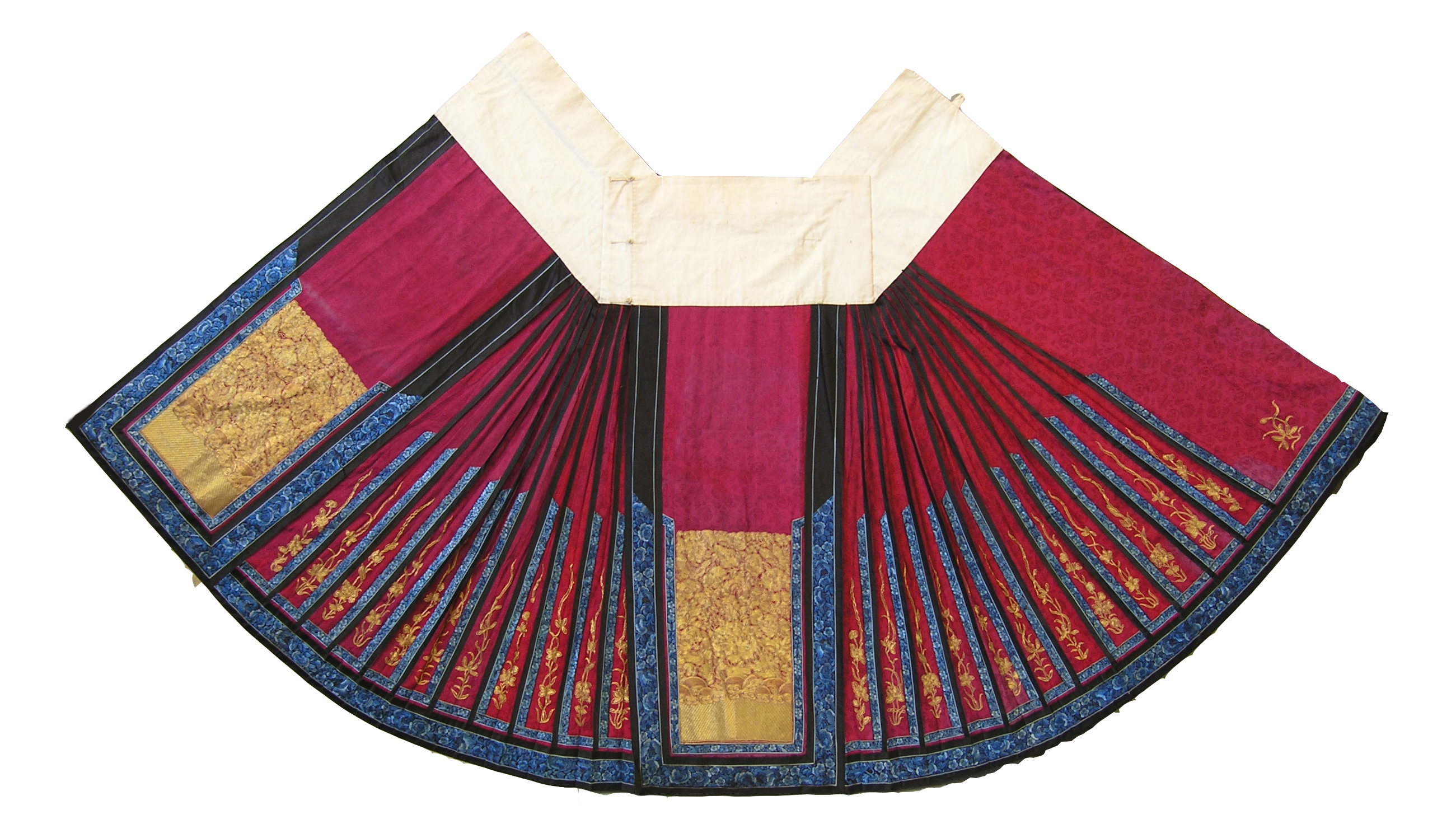
- Mamianqun ornamented with Chinese goldwork and embroideries, a traditional skirt of the Han Chinese, Qing dynasty
- Type: Ornamental gold in textile and fabric
- Material: Typically gold thread or gold imitation thread on a textile foundation
- Place of origin: Asia
- Introduced: Asia, Middle East, Europe

Goldwork is the art of embroidery using metal threads. It is particularly prized for the way light plays on it. The term "goldwork" is used even when the threads are imitation gold, silver, or copper. The metal wires used to make the threads have never been entirely gold; they have always been gold-coated silver or cheaper metals, and even then the "gold" often contains a very low percentage of real gold. Most metal threads are available in silver and sometimes copper as well as gold; some are available in colors as well.

Goldwork is always surface embroidery and free embroidery. The vast majority is a form of laid work or couching; that is, the gold threads are held onto the surface of the fabric by a second thread, usually of fine silk. The ends of the thread, depending on type, are simply cut off, or are pulled through to the back of the embroidery and carefully secured with the couching thread. A tool called a mellore or a stiletto is used to help position the threads and create the holes needed to pull them through. The threads most often have metal or gold leaf wound around a textile core, or are treated with an adhesive and rolled in powdered gold or other metal.

Goldwork was originally developed in Asia, and has been used for at least 2000 years. Its use reached a remarkable level of skill in the Middle Ages, when a style called Opus Anglicanum was developed in England and used extensively in church vestments and hangings. After this period it was also used frequently in the clothing and furnishings of the royalty and nobility throughout Europe, and still later on military and other regalia. Goldwork embroidery can also be found on the national costumes of a number of countries, including items such as hats, vests, jackets, and coats. Examples include bullfighters in Spain who wear "suits of light," wedding clothing in India, and 19th century bonnets from Bavaria called Goldhaube or Riegelhaube. The same silver and gold thread were also used heavily in the most expensive tapestries, especially during the Renaissance. Goldwork is currently a fairly uncommon skill, even among embroiderers who work in other free embroidery styles; it is now most commonly used for the highest-quality church vestments and art embroidery. It has always been reserved for occasional and special use only, due both to the expense of the materials and time to create the embroidery, and because the threads – no matter how expertly applied – will not hold up to frequent laundering of any kind.

Embroidered goldwork is distinct from the even more luxurious cloth of gold, where similar gold threads are woven through the whole piece of textile. Such gold textiles are similarly ancient, perhaps older, being mentioned in the Old Testament of the Bible. Evidence exists for the use of woven (not embroidered) gold thread around the Mediterranean and Western Asia as early as the 4th century BCE, as fillets, ribbons, and bands or borders applied to garments.

== History ==
Goldwork was originally developed in Asia, and has been used for at least 2000 years. In China, it possibly dates back to the Shang dynasty (c. 1570 BC – c. 1045 BC) according to archaeological studies, but was certainly in use by the Eastern Han dynasty (25 to 220 AD).

It had reached ancient Rome soon after 189 BC, initially made in Pergamum (modern Bergama in Western Turkey). King Attalus I probably established large state workshops there, and the gold-embroidered cloth was known as "Attalic" cloth. Pliny the Elder credited Attalus I with inventing the technique, but this is most unlikely. The toga picta, worn by generals in their Roman triumphs, and later consuls and emperors, was dyed solid purple, decorated with imagery in gold thread, and worn over a similarly-decorated tunica palmata.

After the fall of the Roman Empire, it was generally reserved for garments of the nobility and church hangings and vestments, and as a luxury technique survived from ancient times in the Middle Ages. It featured significantly in Byzantine dress and church textiles, and was sometimes worn by musicians and servants in uniform. When illiteracy was common and thus written materials had less impact, "images and the visual realm [had] more power over the senses and the mind. ... The pomp and circumstance created by the awe-inspiring use of metal threads in church work was observed keenly by kings and emulated where possible.

=== China ===
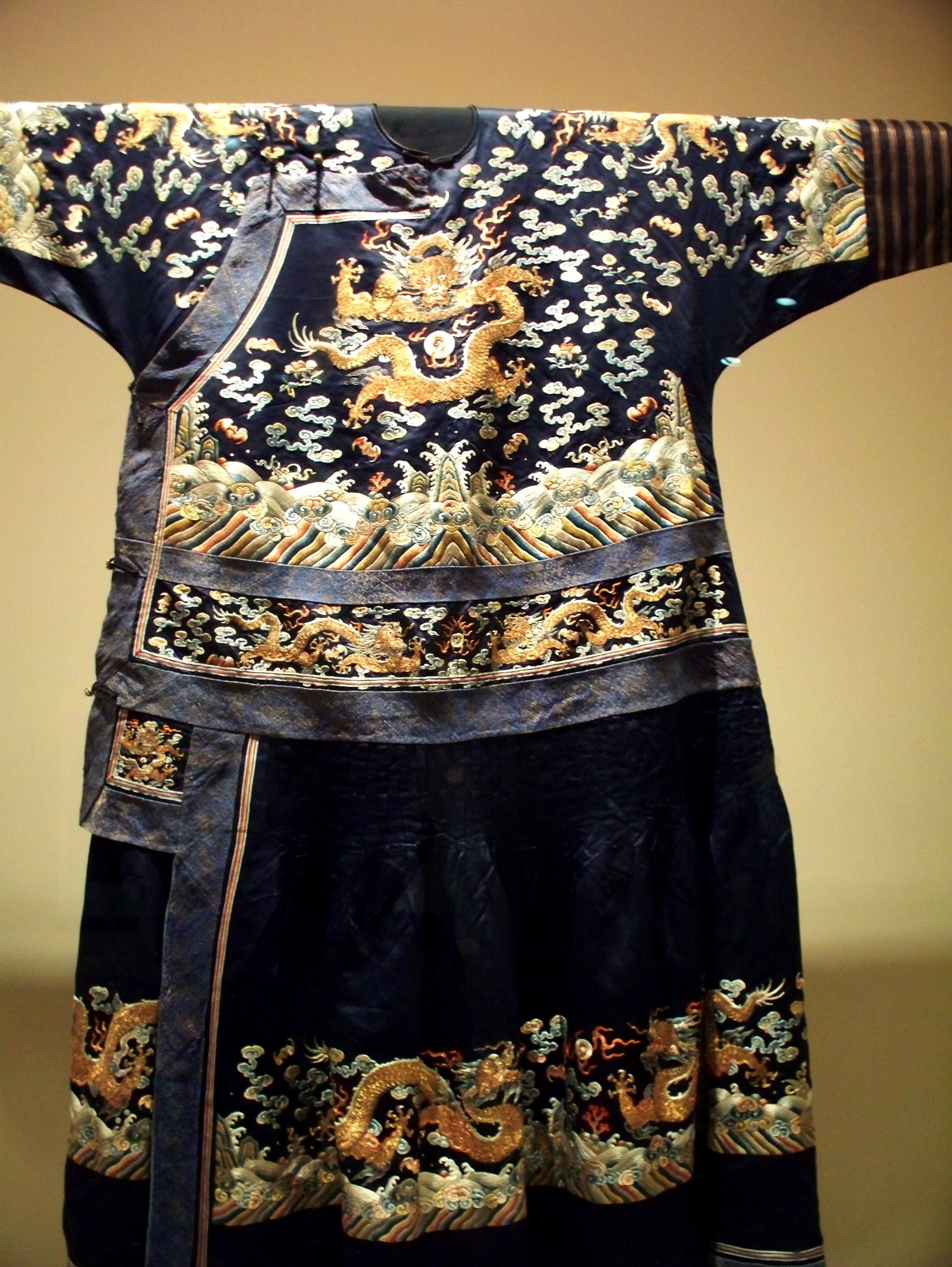
A style of Mangfu, used as court dress in the Qing dynasty, embroidered with gold and silk metallic thread, late 1700s

In China, gold embroidery is a traditional Chinese craft with a long history which was originally used in the imperial palaces and temples. Chinese goldwork, including application of gold leaf, gold powder, gold thread (as embroidery or as woven textile with the exception of Nasīj) in clothing and textile, as well as the silver-work version, originated in ancient China and was used at least since the Eastern Han dynasty (25 to 220 AD) or prior, with possible usage in the Shang dynasty (c. 1570 BC – c. 1045 BC). Since the Zhou dynasty (c.1046 to 256 BC), Chinese embroidery had been used as a social class marker. In China, embroidery in gold was found on imperial and ceremonial dress, and religious dress, and other textile objects. Chinese goldwork often used red silk threads for couching, adding a warmer tone to the embroidery.

One of the two important branches of Chinese gold embroidery is the Chao embroidery which was developed in Chaozhou, Guangdong province since the Tang dynasty (618 to 907 AD) and the gold- and silver-coloured embroidery of Ningbo, which mostly uses gold and silver metallic threads.

=== Europe ===
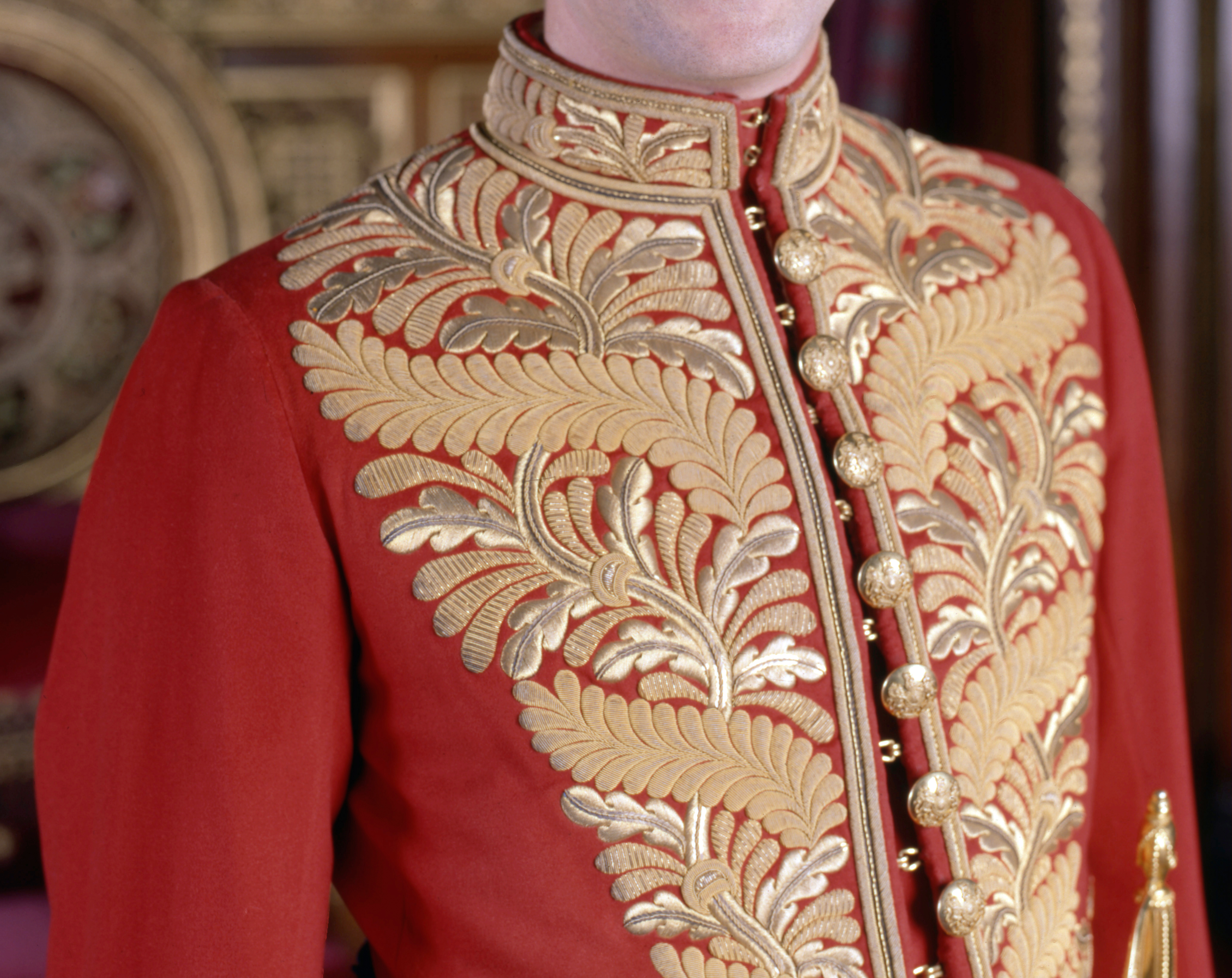
Goldwork embroidery on an English court uniform

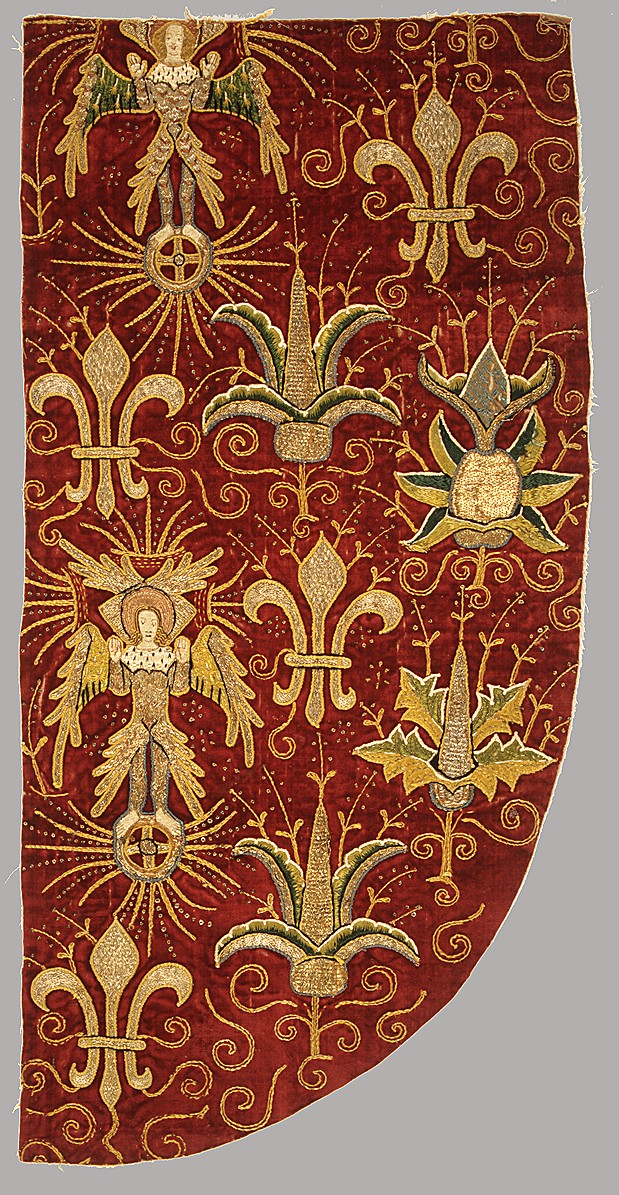
Section of a 15th-century English chasuble

Gold embroidery is attested in the Mycenean and Wessex bronze age culture dating back to 1700 BC although it was only used for weapons. The record of gold embroidery extends far back in English history. Thomas of Ely noted the Abbess of Ely, St. Etheldrada, who died in 679, was adept at embroidering goldwork and made St. Cuthbert a stole and maniple richly embroidered in gold and adorned with gems. Embroidery was thought to be a fitting activity for noblewomen, both those within and outside of convents.

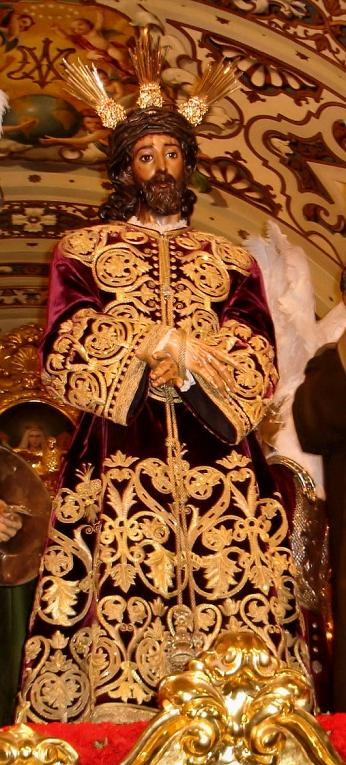
Goldwork, Spain, 20th century

By late antiquity golden silk embroidery technology was introduced to Europe from Asia.

Goldworken silk thread technology were also adopted by Italian weavers. Italian centers of silk production (Lucca, Venice, Florence, and Milan) producing cloth of gold started appearing after the Crusades. Even after golden silk thread was produced for millennia in Europe, golden silk thread was still associated with its origins in China. The producing of gold cloth became common in Europe, such as France and Italy by the 16th century.

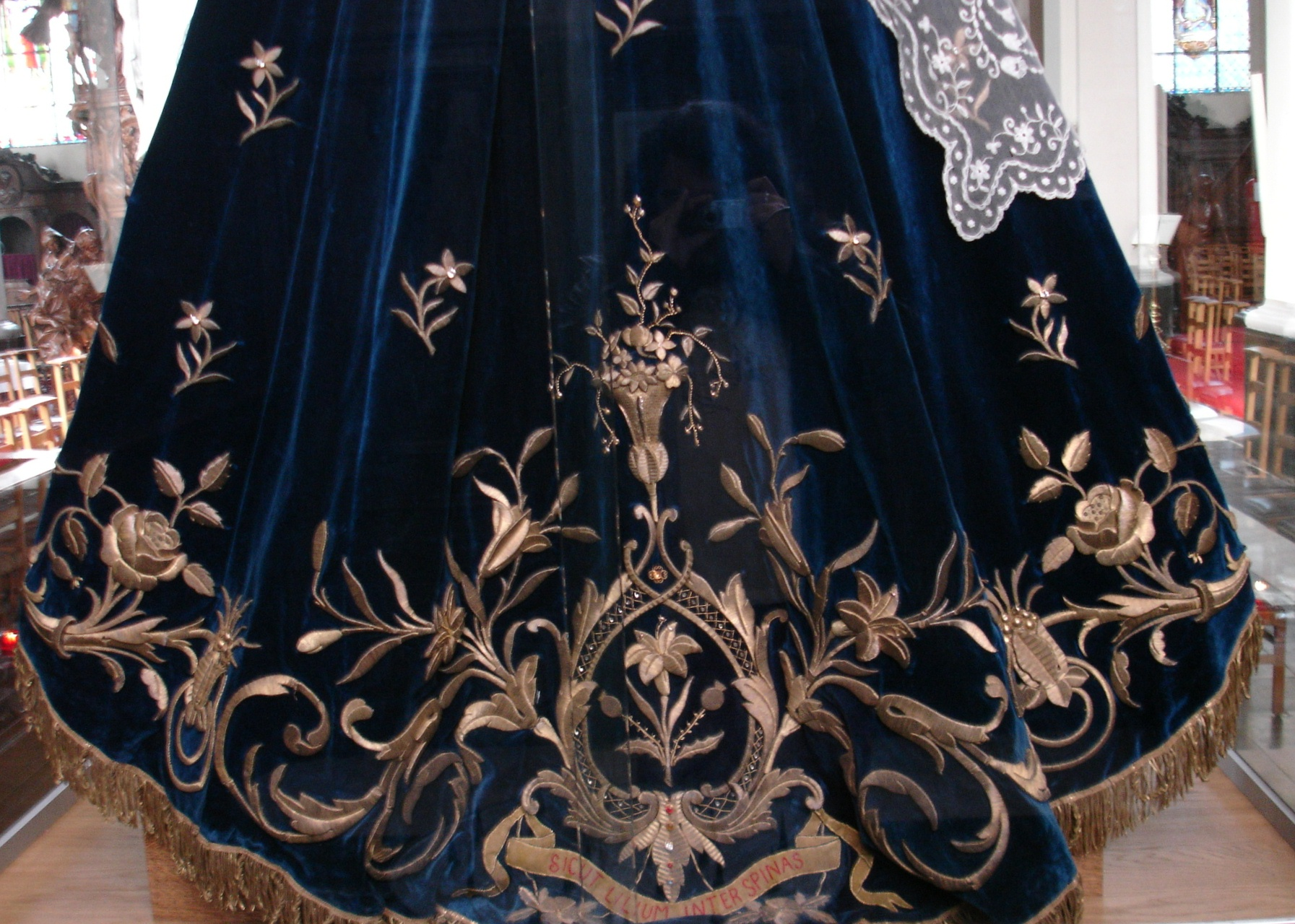
Goldwork, Belgium, 19th century

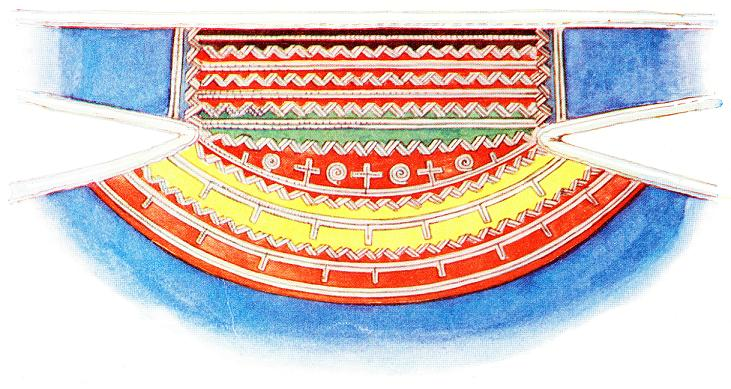
Old pattern of a traditional Nordic Sami peoples metal embroidery collar, Åsele in Sweden. Silver or Pewter thread is most commonly used for the Folk Costume embroidery

After this period it was also used frequently in the clothing and furnishings of the royalty and nobility throughout Europe, and still later on military and other regalia. The Imperial and Ecclesiastical Treasury in Vienna displays vestments decorated with accomplished Or nué in the form of saints.

Or nué ('shaded gold') is a special technique invented in the 15th century, wherein many threads of passing or Japan thread are laid down parallel and touching. By varying the spacing and color of the couching stitches, elaborate, gleaming images can be created. This is commonly used to depict the garments of saints in church embroidery.

Since the price of material is dependent on the market price of gold and silver, the business of goldwork craft has been affected by the 2020s commodities boom and the economic impact of the 2026 Iran war. Crafters working for the Holy Week in Spain have to choose whether to absorb the increased cost or re-negotiate their standing orders.

=== South Asia ===
The use of goldwork in South Asia predates the arrival of the Greeks in 365–323 BC. Metal thread embroidery in the subcontinent uses precious and semiprecious stones and wire in distinctive ways. It is certain that the use of gold and silver embroideries, known as zari, was used in South Asia in the 15th century. Gold thread which was made out of beaten metal strips wrapped around a silk core was introduced in the subcontinent from Singapore.

== Types of metal thread ==
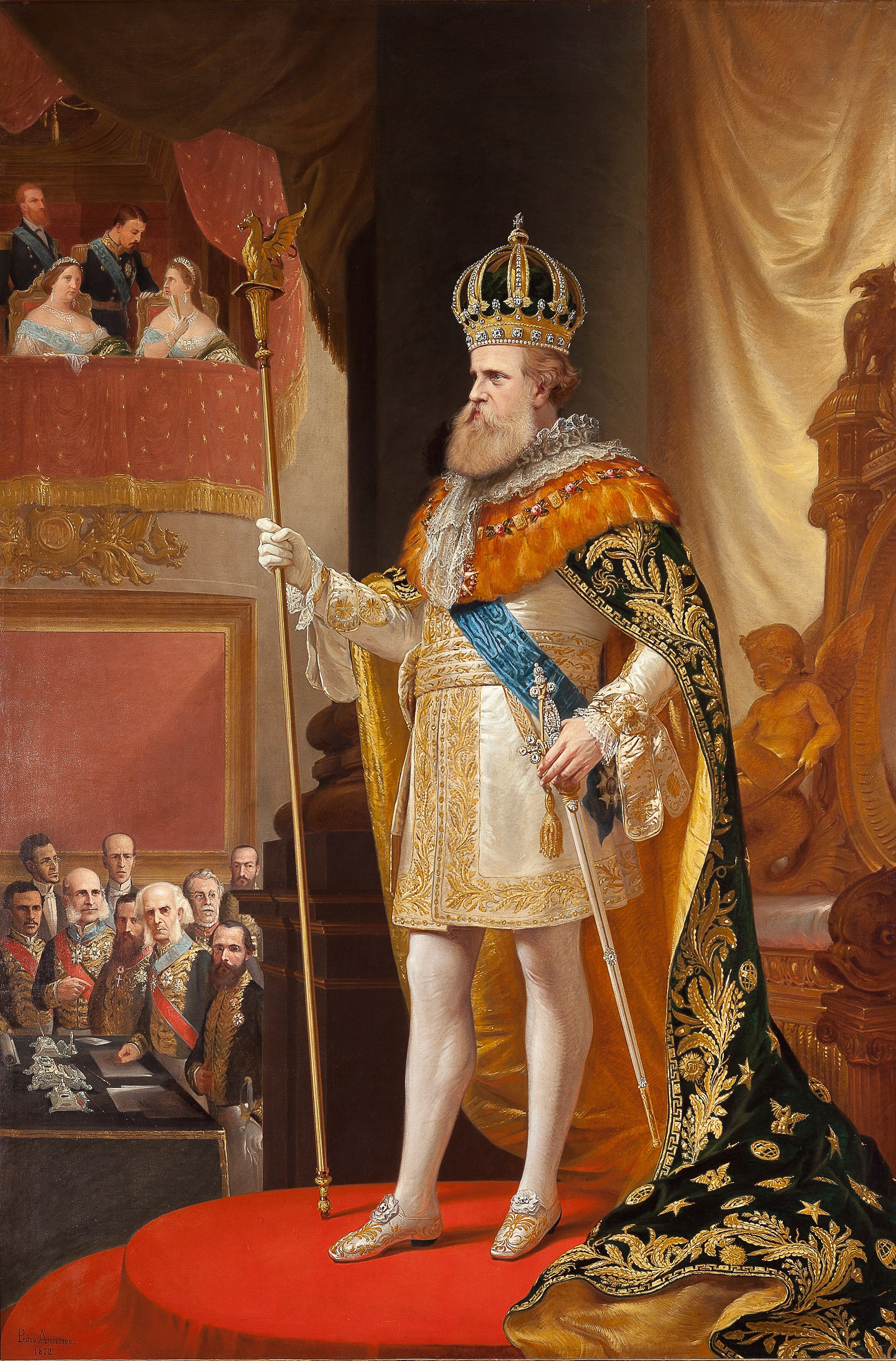
Emperor Pedro II of Brazil in full regalia, 1872

A variety of threads exists, in order to create differing textures.

- Passing is the most basic and common thread used in goldwork; it consists of a thin strip of metal wound around a core of cotton or silk. For gold thread this is typically yellow, or in older examples orange; for silver, white or gray. This is always attached by couching, either one or two threads at a time, and pulled through to the back to secure it. When multiple threads must be laid next to each other, a technique called bricking is used: the position of the couching stitches is offset between rows, producing an appearance similar to a brick wall. This same type of thread is used in making cloth of gold.
- Japan thread, sometimes called jap, is a cheaper replacement for passing, and is far more commonly used in modern goldwork. It appears nearly identical, but rather than a strip of metal, a strip of foil paper is wrapped around the core.
- Bullion or Purl is structurally a very long spring, hollow at the core; it can be stretched apart slightly and couched between the wraps of wire, or cut into short lengths and applied like beads. This thread comes in both shiny and matte versions.
- Jaceron or Pearl purl is similar to bullion, but with a much wider piece of metal which has been shaped (rounded) prior to purling it, such that it looks like a string of pearl-like beads when couched down between the wraps of metal. Lizerine is a similar thread that has a flat appearance having not been shaped prior to purling.
- Frieze or Check purl is again similar, but the metal used is shaped differently, producing a faceted, sparkly look.
- Faconnee or Crimped purl is almost identical to bullion, but has been crimped at intervals.
- Roccoco and the similar Crinkle cordonnet are made of wire tightly wrapped around a cotton core, with a wavy or kinked appearance.
- Milliary wire is a stretched pearl purl laced to a base of passing thread.
- Broad Plate is a strip of metal a 2 millimeters wide; often this is used to fill small shapes by folding it back and forth, hiding the couching stitches under the folds. This is also available as 11's plate which is 1mm wide and whipped plate where the broad plate has a fine wire wrapped around it.
- Flat Worm or simply Oval thread is a thin plate wrapped around a yarn core and flattened slightly. This is used like plate, but is considerably easier to work with.
- Twists or Torsade, threads made of multiple strands of metal twisted together are also sometimes used, some of which, such as Soutache, sometimes have different colored metals or colored non-metal threads twisted together. These are either couched like passing, with the couching thread visible, or with the thread angled with the twist to make it invisible.

In addition, paillettes or spangles (sequins of real metal), small pieces of appliqued rich fabric or kid leather, pearls, and real or imitation gems are commonly used as accents, and felt or string padding may be used to create raised areas or texture. Silk thread work in satin stitch or other stitches is often combined with goldwork, and in some periods goldwork was combined with blackwork embroidery as well.

== Types of stitches ==
Goldwork embroidery employs several traditional stitches, each contributing to the texture and appearance of the work. Common techniques include:

- Satin stitch, used for smooth surface coverage on shapes and motifs, often worked over padding to create raised effects. It is suitable for smaller areas where tightly packed parallel stitches maintain tension and sheen.
- Trellis stitch, a decorative lattice formed by intersecting diagonal lines, is used to fill larger areas and may be embellished with beads or sequins. It creates depth and allows variation in spacing for different visual effects.
- Laid stitch, one of the oldest methods in goldwork, involves placing long parallel threads across a shape and securing them with small couching stitches. Historically valued for its efficiency in covering large designs, it remains widely used for its simplicity and versatility.
- Chain stitch, constructed from a series of interconnected loops, provides a flexible line that adapts well to curves. It is one of the earliest stitches in embroidery and was later adopted in early sewing machine mechanisms.

== See also ==
- Couching
- Adras (fabric)
