= Riegelhaube =

German head covering

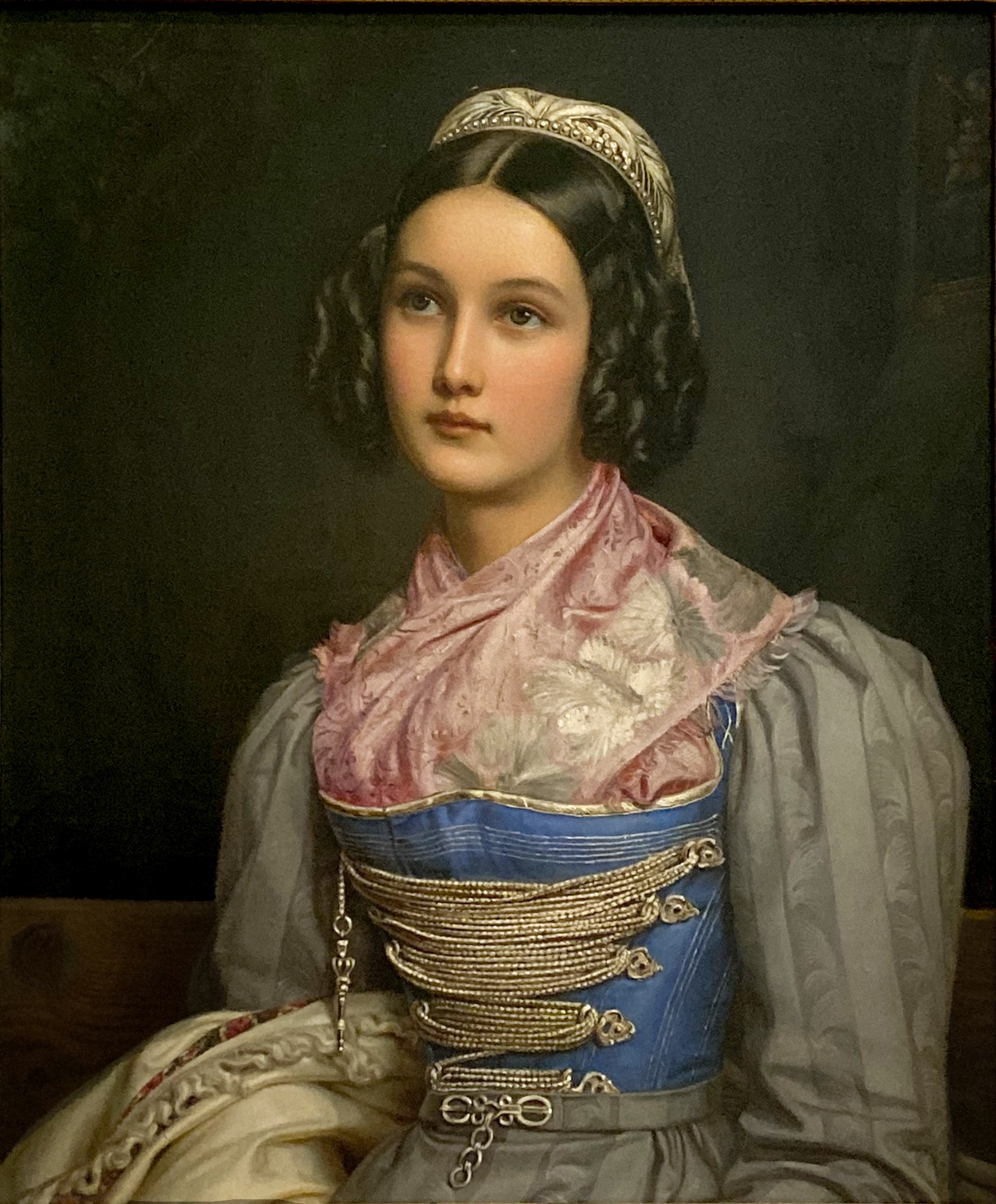
Helene Sedlmayr, the epitome of the "beautiful Municher" wears the Riegelhaube with her old Munich costume.

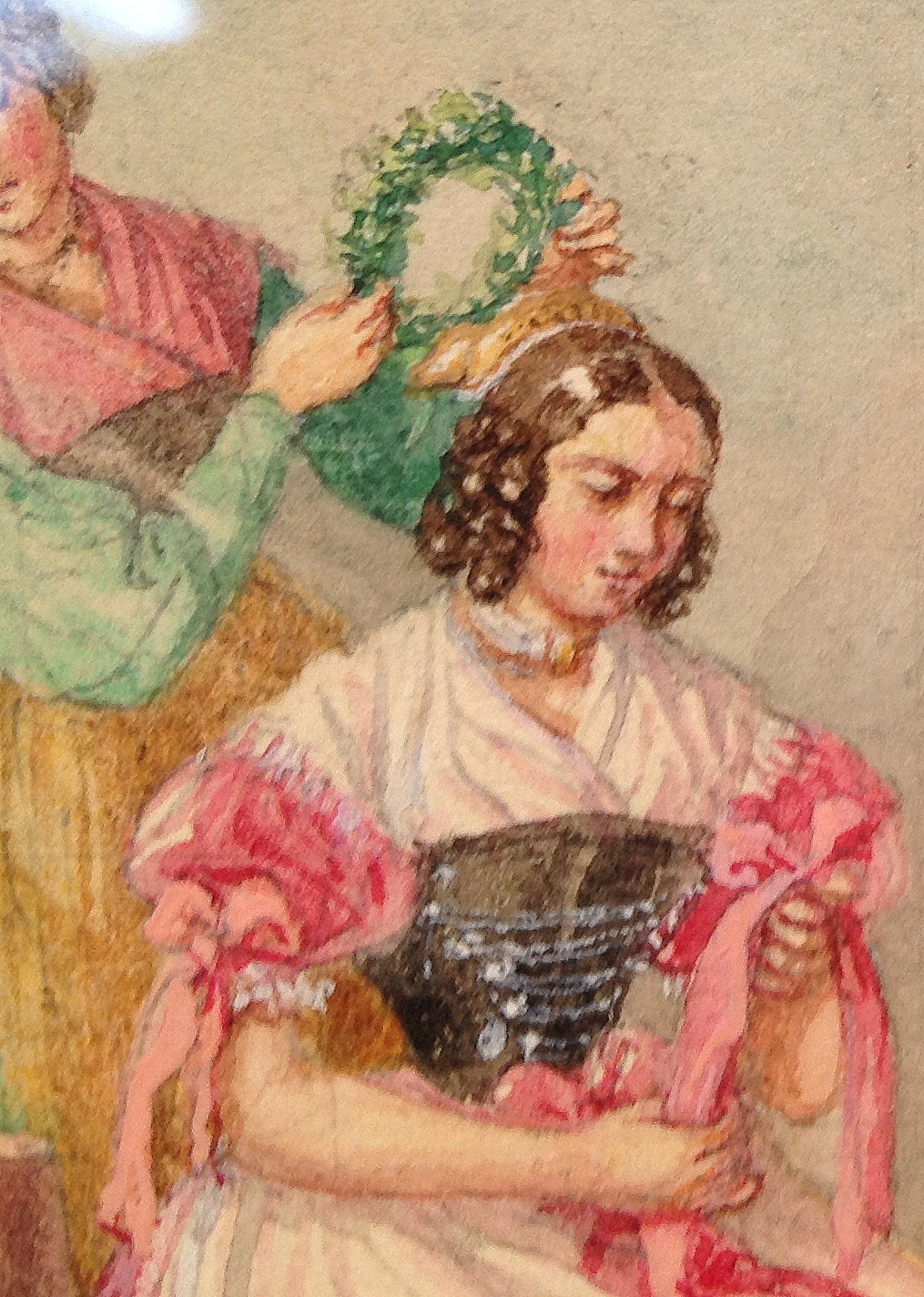
A myrtle wreath was sometimes worn in addition to the Riegelhaube.

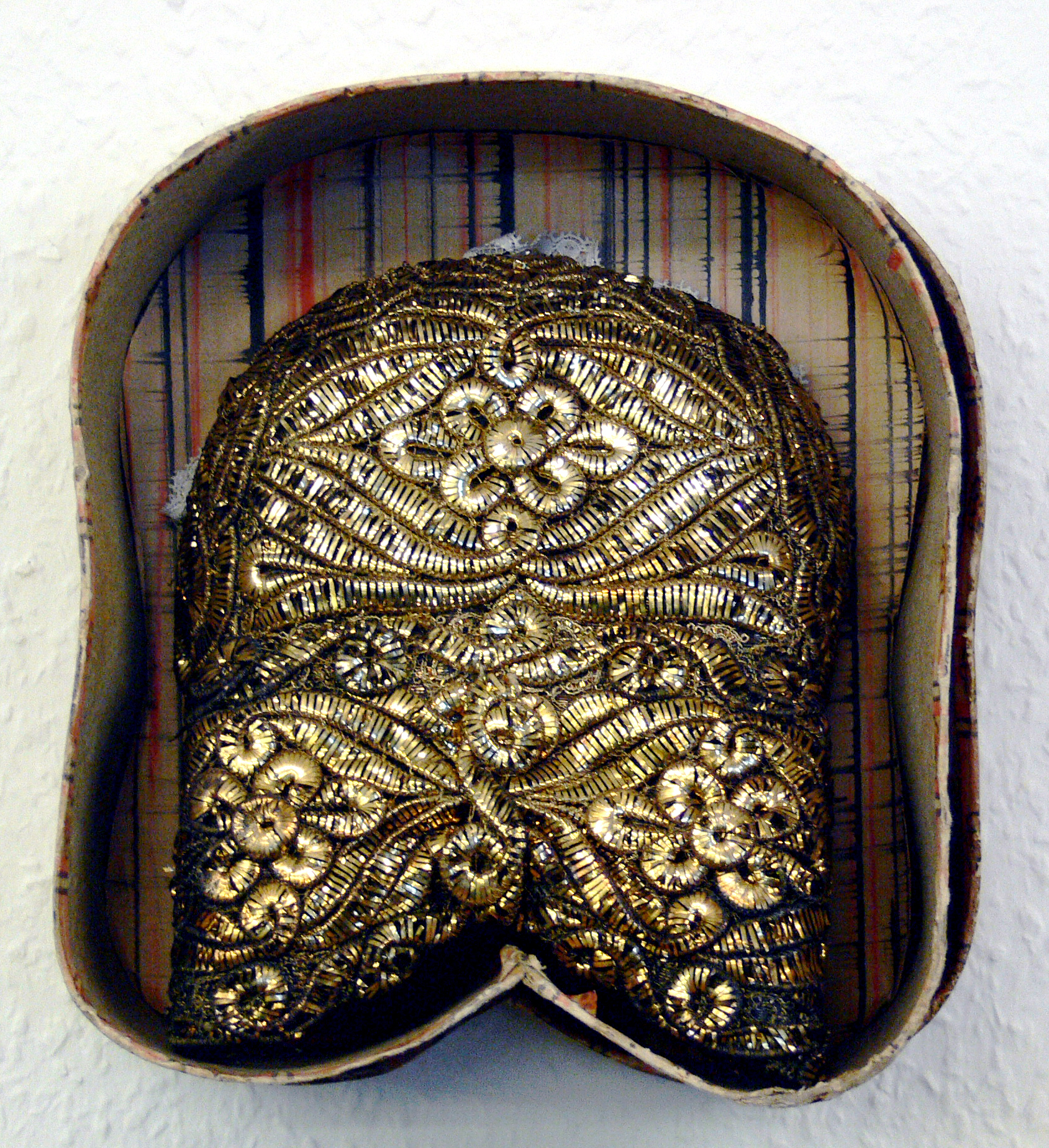
Riegelhaube (in a hat box), Augsburg around 1830/1840

The Riegelhaube is a head covering made with complex and precious materials and worn by women of the affluent class. It was worn mainly in the 18th and 19th centuries in and around Munich. In the Gallery of Beauties of King Ludwig I of Bavaria is the portrait of Helene Sedlmayr, epitome of the "beautiful Municher," and is shown wearing a Riegelhaube.

== Earliest Evidence ==
The earliest evidence of a Riegelhaube is from a Nymphenburg porcelain figurine from the modeler Bustelli, dated 1755. This early form was common not only in Munich, but in large parts of southern Germany. It covers the back of the head from ear to ear and is characterized by a large bow at the back of the head.

== History ==
In the Middle Ages the wearing of a hood was a sign that the woman was married. Their forms were subjected to their respective fashions. Old Bavaria developed the Rococo cap that was in its original form made from white linen and had the hair almost entirely enclosed in a small, circular cap form and fastened with a bow on the top. The ribbon bow at the neck gradually evolved from a functional bow to a mere symbol of a bow, as is typical of a Riegelhaube. With the abolition of the feudal dress code at the end of the 18th century citizens were allowed in the open streets to wear textiles made with silver and gold. Caps were now being made with precious brocade and velvet fabrics and embroidered with beads and threads of precious metals. The size of the head cover at the same time grew smaller and smaller, becoming held with only "hood pins" made of silver.

It was only in the 19th century that the hood took a very petite shape known today as the Riegelhaube form. It is worn on the upswept hear on the back. The crown should be covered together with the hair knot of a wound braid. It consists of a stiff cardboard base that supports precious metals, a padding, and a layer of brocade, velvet, silver or gold fabric, more or less embroidered with silver or gold thread. In the vernacular the Riegelhaube was also called "Geißeuterl" (goat udders) because of its two downward pointing points. In the time of the Empire and the Biedermeier it was worn with fashionable clothing. August Lewald wrote in 1835: "The so very popular Riegelhaube, which can be seen especially on the young Munichers' delicates faces, is a very peculiar headdress, which shows no similarity to any other in Germany."

No Riegelhaube looked like another. One special form is made with blue and black beads embroidered on a covered black base Riegelhaube. Silver caps were probably worn by unmarried, golden by married and black or black-blue by widowed women. Riegelhaube are indeed typical of the Munich costume in the early 19th Century, but based on collected producers' notes it can be proved that Riegelhaube were also made in places like Augsburg or Regensburg. This means that the caps were worn around Munich and were fashionable in other cities in Bavaria.

== Books ==
- Barbara Brückner: Die Münchner Riegelhaube. In: Bayerisches Jahrbuch für Volkskunde 1958, S. 39-52
- Volker D. Laturell: Trachten in und um München. München 1998
- Christian Müller: München unter König Maximilian Joseph I.. Mainz 1816
- Rita Szeibert-Sülzenfuhs: Die Münchnerinnern und ihre Tracht: Geschichte einer traditionellen Stadttracht als Spiegel der weiblichen Bürgerschicht. Verlagsanstalt Bayernland, Dachau 1997
- Carl Wibmer: Medizinische Topographie und Ethnographie der k. Haupt- und Residenzstadt München. München 1862
