= Soutache =

Decorative braid used in the trimming of drapery or clothing

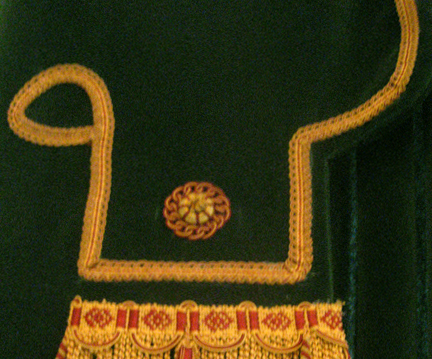
A curved border of soutache trim in drapery found in the Senate Chamber of the Vermont State House

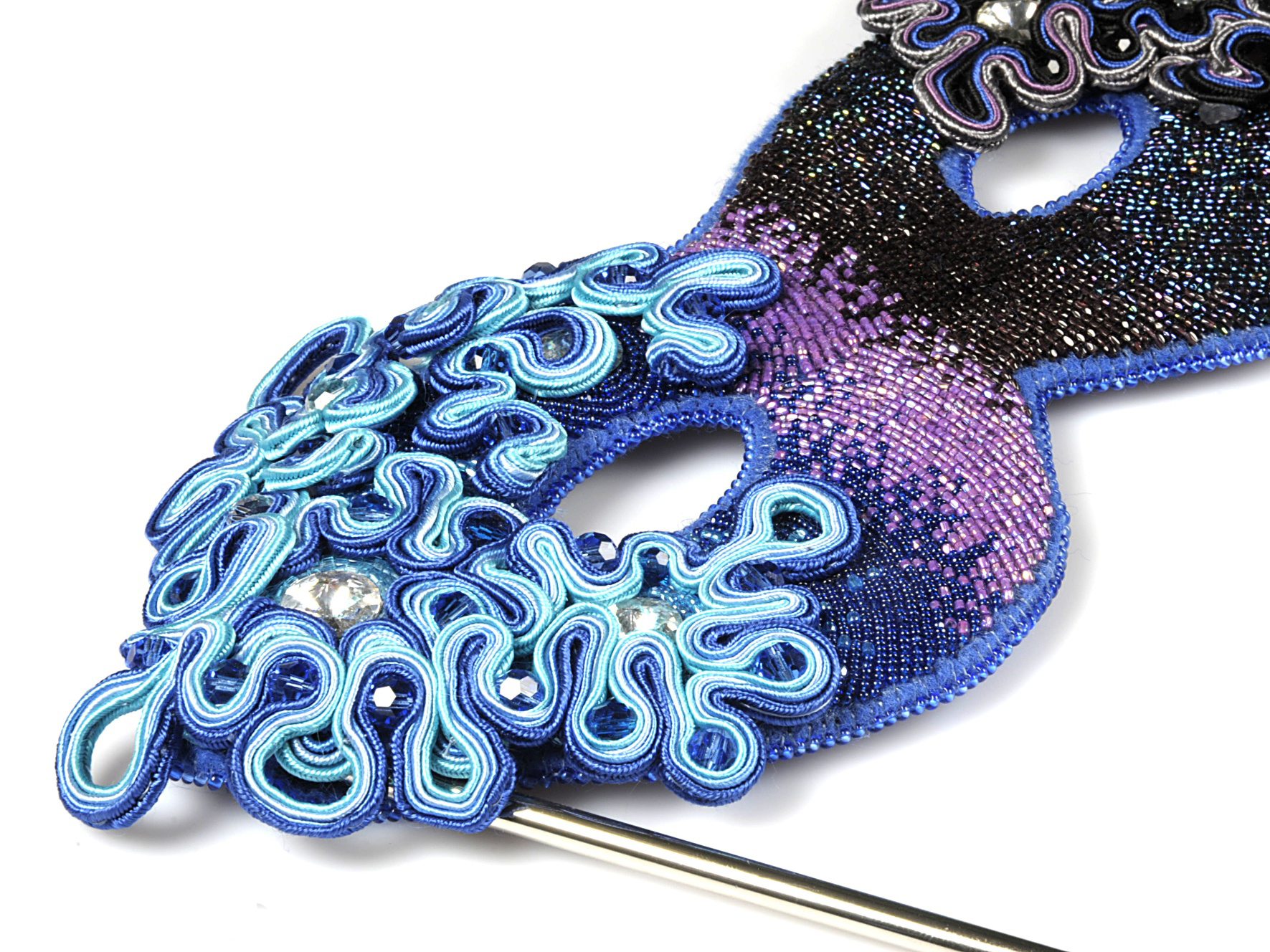
A beaded mask decorated with soutache

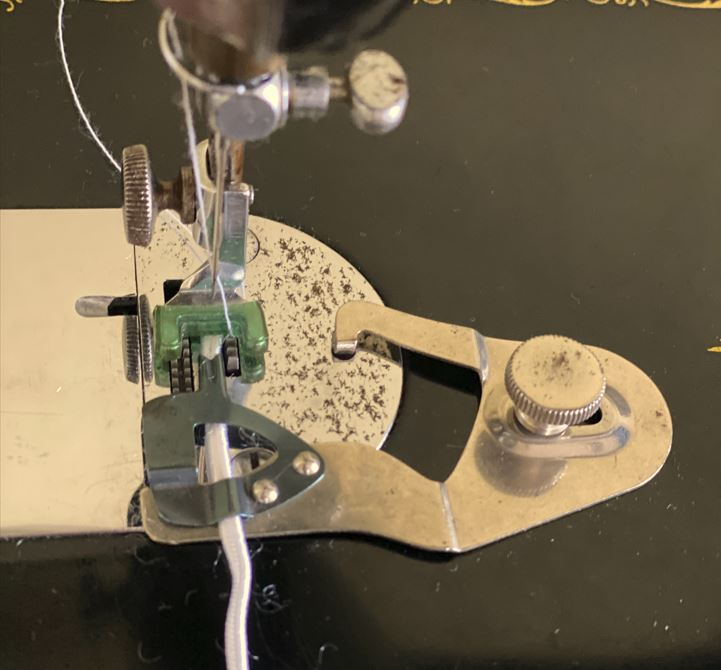
An underbraider on a Singer sewing machine shown with soutache in place feeding under needle

Soutache (/suːˈtæʃ/, soo-TASH), also known as Russia braid, is a narrow flat decorative braid, a type of galloon, used in the trimming of drapery or clothing. Soutache is created by weaving a decorative thread around and between two parallel cords and completely covering the cores; this produces a piece of trim with a braided or herringbone pattern. Often woven of metallic bullion thread, silk, or a blend of silk and wool, soutache began to be made of rayon and other synthetic fibers in the 20th century.

== Uses ==
Soutache is used in passementerie to add decorations to textiles. In clothing soutache is used to conceal seams or add embroidered decorations.

Tracing braid is narrow soutache trim used for decorating uniforms. In military uniforms, edgings or loops of soutache in different widths and colors are used to indicate rank, particularly in hats. In athletic uniforms, a contrasting soutache is sometimes used to trim the placket and outline numbers or players' names.

The term is also used in bookbinding, where a narrow soutache is applied at the top and bottom of a book back to reinforce the spine and provide a barrier to keep dust out of the binding.

Soutache is incorporated into standalone accessories like jewelry, typically with beads.

=== Use on uniforms ===
In the Specifications for the Uniform of the United States Army from 1917, there is a detailed description of the differing rows of soutache braid on the sleeve of full dress and special evening dress coats. A colonel would have a knot formed from five rows of 1/8" gold or gilt, a lieutenant colonel four rows, a major three, a captain two, and a first lieutenant would have one row. For an overcoat, 1/8" of black soutache would be used.

In France in 1889, gold and silver soutache appeared on the kepi (French military caps) and dolmans of different military officials: the chief of the post would have one row of silver soutache, while the director of the telegraph would have five rows.

== History ==
Soutache originated in France in the 15th century, and was used to trim clothing for the aristocracy and create jewelry. By the 17th century, it joined other trimmings such as ribbon and lace that were key elements of the fashions of the upper class, in France and beyond.

Soutache braid began to be used on uniforms in France under Napoleon in the early 19th century. It was also used on Ottoman military and bureaucratic dress during the 19th century, and this use spread to other countries under Ottoman rule in the Levant and North Africa.

With the Industrial Revolution and the increased availability of less expensive clothing and decorative trims, soutache began to be found on ready-to-wear clothing, making it within the reach of a wider range of people. Soutache came into its own with more elaborate Victorian clothing.

An attachment known as an underbraider was made available for domestic sewing machines. This would feed soutache directly under the needle on the reverse side of the fabric so that designs could be stitched by machine. Manuals and reference books from the middle of the twentieth century indicate that it was very popular at that time, such as Singer Sewing Skills Reference Book (1957).

== Continue reading ==
- Pegler, Martin M. (1983). The Dictionary of Interior Design. New York: Fairchild Publications. ISBN 0870054473.
