= History of the Miami Marlins =

Sports team history

The Miami Marlins are a Major League Baseball team that plays in the city of Miami as a member club of the National League (NL) East Division. Founded in 1991 as an expansion team - they were originally called the Florida Marlins. Their first game was in 1993, in Sun Life Stadium. The team changed their name in 2012, to the Miami Marlins, and moved, still playing their home games at LoanDepot Park. As of the end of the 2025 regular season, the Marlins have the second lowest winning percentage (.460) and the fewest post season appearances among active MLB franchises (four). In their first two playoff appearances, the Miami Marlins won the World Series, in 1997 and 2003.

== 1990–1997: Early years and first World Series ==
On March 7, 1990, Wayne Huizenga, CEO of Blockbuster Entertainment Corporation, announced he had purchased 15% of the NFL's Miami Dolphins and 50% of the Dolphins' home, Joe Robbie Stadium, for an estimated $30 million. Huizenga stated his intention to aggressively pursue an expansion franchise. MLB had announced a few months earlier that it intended to add two new teams to the National League. It was a foregone conclusion that one of them would be placed in Florida; the only question was whether Huizenga would beat out competing groups from Orlando and Tampa Bay. Orlando fielded a very spirited campaign bolstered by its family-oriented tourism industry. Tampa Bay already had a baseball park — the Florida Suncoast Dome in St. Petersburg, completed in 1990. However, on June 10, 1991, the National League awarded a Miami-based franchise to Huizenga for a $95 million expansion fee (Tampa Bay, however, would get an MLB team of its own in 1998 when the Devil Rays started play). One name considered early on was the Florida Flamingos. The franchise adopted the nickname "Marlins" from previous minor league teams, the Miami Marlins of the International League from 1956 to 1960, and the Miami Marlins (1962–1970) and Miami Marlins (1982–1988) teams that played in the Florida State League; the new major league Marlins replaced the erstwhile FSL Marlins (which changed its nickname to the Miracle in 1989) as the city's main baseball team, and would move westward to Fort Myers in 1992.

In November 1991, the Marlins hired Fredi González as the Marlins first Minor League manager.

On December 16, 1991, they made their first signing, inking 16-year-old Dominican pitcher Clemente Núñez to a contract. In June 1992, they selected catcher Charles Johnson of the University of Miami with their first first-round draft pick. Later that year, Marlins President Carl Barger collapsed and died at the baseball winter meetings in Louisville, Kentucky. The Marlins later retired the number 5 in honor of Barger's favorite player, Joe DiMaggio, but the team would issue the number into circulation for the first time when they moved to the city of Miami in 2012 and instead honored Barger with a plaque at the new Marlins Park.

The Marlins' first manager was Rene Lachemann, a former catcher who had previously managed the Seattle Mariners and Milwaukee Brewers, and who at the time of his hiring was a third base coach for the Oakland Athletics. The team drafted its initial lineup of players in the 1992 MLB Expansion Draft. The Marlins defeated the Houston Astros 12–8 in their inaugural spring training game. Jeff Conine hit Florida's first homer before a crowd of 6,696 at the Cocoa Expo Sports Complex. The Marlins won their first game on April 5, 1993, against the Dodgers. Charlie Hough was the starting pitcher for that game. Jeff Conine went 4-for-4 as well, making him an immediate crowd favorite. By the end of his tenure with Florida, he had earned the nickname "Mr. Marlin." Gary Sheffield and Bryan Harvey represented the Marlins as the club's first All-Star Game selections, and Sheffield homered in the Marlins' first All-Star Game at-bat. The team finished the year five games ahead of the last-place New York Mets and with an attendance of 3,064,847. In that season, the Marlins traded young set-up reliever Trevor Hoffman and two minor-league prospects to the San Diego Padres for third baseman Gary Sheffield. While Sheffield helped Florida immediately and became an all-star, Hoffman eventually emerged as the best closer in the National League. After the 1993 season, Donald A. Smiley was named the second president in club history. The Marlins finished last (51–64) in their division in the strike-shortened season of 1994 and fourth (67–76) in 1995. Lachemann was replaced as manager midway through the 1996 season by director of player development John Boles.

The Marlins had some bright spots on the mound and behind the plate in 1996. The team's 3.95 ERA ranked third in the NL, thanks in large part to newcomer Kevin Brown, who finished the season with a 17–11 win–loss record and an impressive 1.89 ERA. On May 11, Al Leiter pitched the first no-hitter in Marlins history. Catcher Charles Johnson led the league with a .995 fielding percentage, threw out a league-high 48 percent of baserunners and collected his second straight Gold Glove Award for fielding excellence. After a slow start, the Marlins finished 80–82 to place third in their division. Boles returned to his previous position as director of player development, and former Pittsburgh Pirates manager Jim Leyland was hired to lead the club in 1997.

=== 1997: First World Series title ===
In addition to hiring Leyland as manager, the Marlins signed third baseman Bobby Bonilla, outfielder Moisés Alou, and pitcher Alex Fernandez to lucrative free-agent contracts, raising expectations to levels far beyond anything in franchise history.

The Marlins franchise got its second no-hitter from ace Kevin Brown on June 10, 1997. Brown nearly had the perfect game, but he hit the Giants' Marvin Benard with a pitch in the 8th inning when Benard attempted to bunt. With Brown, Leiter, and Fernandez heading the rotation, and Robb Nen closing out games, the Marlins' staff was almost systematic during their regular season run. In 1997, the Marlins finished nine games back of the Division Champion Atlanta Braves, but earned the wild card berth. Veteran additions such as left fielder Moisés Alou, third baseman Bobby Bonilla, and trade-deadline additions Darren Daulton and Jim Eisenreich added experience and clutch hits. Talented young stars Luis Castillo (2B) and Édgar Rentería (SS) comprised one of the best double play combos in the League. Castillo did not perform to expectations offensively, and was replaced by Craig Counsell before the playoffs began. The Marlins swept the San Francisco Giants 3–0 in the National League Division Series, and then went on to beat the Atlanta Braves 4–2 in the National League Championship Series, overcoming the loss of Alex Fernandez to a torn rotator cuff, and Kevin Brown to a virus. Brown's place was taken in Game 5 by rookie pitcher Liván Hernández, who had earned a spot in the rotation in the second half of the season, but was not in the rotation during the postseason. Hernandez struck out 15 Braves and outdueled multiple Cy Young Award winner Greg Maddux to a 2–1 victory and a 3–2 series lead. Brown returned to the mound for Game 6, pitching a complete game victory to secure the Marlins their first-ever National League pennant. The underdog Marlins went on to face the Cleveland Indians in the 1997 World Series, and won in seven games. In Game 7, Craig Counsell's sacrifice fly in the bottom of the ninth tied the game at 2, then, with the bases loaded and two outs in the bottom of the 11th, Édgar Rentería's soft liner glanced off the glove of Cleveland pitcher Charles Nagy and into center field to score Counsell and give the Marlins the win.

=== The "Fire Sale" offseason ===
Following the World Series victory, Huizenga dismantled the team, claiming financial losses despite winning the World Series. He traded most of the club's best players in one of the biggest fire sales in sports history. The first deal came days after the World Series, when outfielder Moisés Alou was traded to the Houston Astros for pitchers Oscar Hernandez and Manuel Barrios. The Marlins then traded Kevin Brown to the San Diego Padres for Derrek Lee and 2 minor leaguers. Finally, in May 1998, they dealt Bobby Bonilla, Gary Sheffield, Charles Johnson, Jim Eisenreich, and Manuel Barrios to the Los Angeles Dodgers for Mike Piazza and Todd Zeile, both of whom would be gone via trades by midseason. On the flip side, these trades brought promising youngsters Derrek Lee and A. J. Burnett.

The Marlins did manage to win a second World Series just six years later in 2003. One player played on both championship teams despite being included in the "fire sale": Jeff Conine. Conine was traded after the 1997 season to the Kansas City Royals who in turn traded him to the Baltimore Orioles. The Marlins picked up Conine in a late season trade during the 2003 pennant race.

== 1998–2002: Last place finishes, new ownership and front office ==
The Marlins slumped to 54–108 in 1998, the worst record in the major leagues that year, and the most losses in franchise history. They are the only team to lose 100 games a year after winning the World Series. Leyland resigned as manager in October 1998, and was replaced by John Boles. Huizenga soon sold the club to John Henry, a commodities trader from Boca Raton, during the off-season. The Marlins had the second overall pick in the 1999 draft and drafted Josh Beckett, a high school pitcher from the Houston area.

In 1999, the Marlins were the first MLB team to host a game in which instant replay was used. While playing the Cardinals, Cliff Floyd hit a ball to the top of the left field scoreboard. Originally ruled a home run, NL umpire Frank Pulli reversed the call to a double, after consulting a dugout television monitor. The Cardinals won the game, 5–2. After the game, the NL League Office declared the umpires erred in using instant replay. MLB would not use instant replay again for almost a decade. The Marlins finished the 1999 season with the worst record in baseball at 64–98, and traded World Series MVP Liván Hernández to the San Francisco Giants. The Marlins also drafted pitcher Johan Santana from Houston in the Rule 5 draft but traded him to Minnesota in a prearranged deal for pitcher Jared Camp.

A month prior to the regular season, the Marlins hired David Dombrowski as the third President in club history, making him both President and General Manager. After posting the worst record in baseball for the 1999 season, the Marlins had the first overall pick in the 2000 first-year player draft and selected first baseman Adrián González, an 18-year-old native of Bonita, California. The Eastlake High School product agreed to terms with the Marlins that same day. The Marlins went on that season to finish 79–82 and third in the NL East. This was thanks to the emergence of OF Preston Wilson who had 31 home runs and 121 RBIs. Derrek Lee and Luis Castillo broke out this year as well, as Castillo posted a .334 batting average and Lee had 28 homers in his first full season. Antonio Alfonseca posted a then-club record 45 saves.

The club slowly worked its way back to respectability with a third-place finish in 2000, driven by young stars such as A. J. Burnett, Brad Penny, Preston Wilson, Luis Castillo, and Mike Lowell. Burnett pitched the Marlins' third no-hitter on May 12, 2001, against the Padres, despite walking nine batters and throwing only half of his pitches for strikes. Three weeks after the no-no, Manager John Boles was fired and Hall of Famer Tony Pérez was named interim manager for the rest of the season. The club finished 76–86 and in fourth place, thanks to Brad Penny's and A. J. Burnett's emergence.

The offseason following the 2001 regular season included an overhaul of the ownership and front office. Tony Pérez resigned and returned to his previous role as the front-office Baseball Operations assistant. About a month later, David Dombrowski resigned as President and General Manager of the Florida Marlins and accepted the position as President of the Detroit Tigers. Entering the new year, Henry sold the Marlins to Montreal Expos owner Jeffrey Loria, clearing the way for Henry to buy the Boston Red Sox. Loria brought the entire Expos management and coaching staff to the Marlins. David Samson became team president, Larry Beinfest became General Manager and Jeff Torborg became manager.

Prior to the 2002 season, the Marlins traded RHP Matt Clement and RHP Antonio Alfonseca to the Cubs for RHP Julián Tavárez, LHP Dontrelle Willis, RHP Jose Cueto and C Ryan Jorgensen. The Marlins had their ups as Luis Castillo had a team record 35-game hitting streak and Kevin Millar had a 25-game hit streak. Around the All-Star break they made their second big trade, sending OF Cliff Floyd to the Expos for RHP Carl Pavano, RHP Justin Wayne, INF Mike Mordecai, LHP Graeme Lloyd, RHP Don Levinski and INF Wilton Guerrero. The same day, the Fish dealt RHP Ryan Dempster to the Cincinnati Reds for OF Juan Encarnación and LHP Ryan Snare. The Marlins finished 79–83, the second-best season in team history up to that time, but their fifth straight losing season since winning the World Series.

The Marlins also turned their first ever triple play in franchise history on July 28, 2002.

== 2003–2005: The first Jack McKeon era and Second World Championship ==
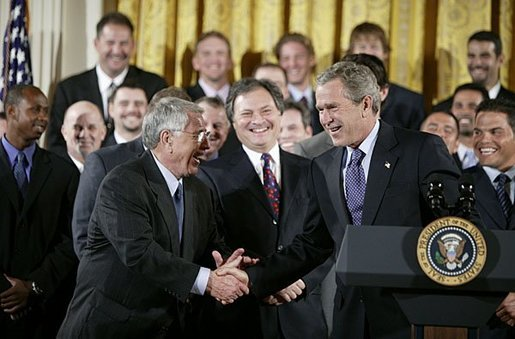
Members of the 2003 Florida Marlins championship team with President Bush after their win

=== 2003: Second World Series victory ===
During the offseason, the Marlins signed free agent catcher Iván Rodríguez – a 10-time Gold Glove Award winner – and acquired speedy outfielder Juan Pierre from the Colorado Rockies hoping to offset the loss of sluggers Cliff Floyd and Preston Wilson. The Marlins did acquire pitcher Mike Hampton but dealt him and his hefty contract to the Braves for pitcher Tim Spooneybarger.

The Marlins struggled in the opening stages of the season, going 16–22. During that span, Florida lost its top three pitchers: A. J. Burnett, Josh Beckett, and Mark Redman. On May 11, Florida replaced manager Jeff Torborg with 72-year-old Jack McKeon. On May 22, the Marlins hit rock bottom with a major league worst record of 19–29, having lost 6 straight games. However, help was on the way.

On May 9, the Marlins called up high-kicking southpaw Dontrelle Willis from the Double-A Carolina Mudcats and helped carry the injury-plagued Marlins with an 11–2 record in his first 17 starts. Miguel Cabrera (also from the Mudcats) filled in well, hitting a walk off home run in his first major league game, against the Tampa Bay Devil Rays at Pro Player Stadium. Both Willis and Cabrera would later prove to be essential parts of the Marlins’ playoff success. Jeff Conine – an original Marlin and member of the 1997 World Series team – returned from Baltimore, and closer Ugueth Urbina arrived from the Texas Rangers. These acquisitions helped to keep the team in contention, and although they finished ten games behind the Braves, the Marlins captured the NL wild card.

The Marlins won the Division Series against the favored San Francisco Giants three games to one. The series ended with a dramatic collision between Marlins catcher Rodríguez and Giants first baseman J. T. Snow, making it the first postseason series ever to end with the potential tying run being thrown out at the plate. It was the second time that the Marlins defeated the Giants in the Division Series, having done so in 1997.

On October 15, the Marlins defeated the Chicago Cubs four games to three in the Championship Series, coming back from a three games to one deficit. A Beckett complete-game shutout in Game 5 kept the Marlins alive. Game 6 saw the Marlins play a role in one of baseball's most infamous moments: "The Inning". With one out in the 8th inning and the Cubs three runs ahead, Marlins second baseman Luis Castillo hit a pop foul a row into the stands along the third base line. Cubs fan Steve Bartman reached for the ball, preventing Cubs left fielder Moisés Alou from making the out and setting off an 8-run Marlins rally. The incident with Steve Bartman and a come-from-behind win in Wrigley Field in Game 7 helped the Marlins capture their second NL pennant, keeping the "Curse of the Billy Goat" alive and well.

In the 2003 World Series, the Marlins defeated the heavily favored New York Yankees in six games, winning the sixth game in Yankee Stadium. Shortstop Álex González helped the Marlins in Game 4 of the series with a walk-off home run in extra innings. Josh Beckett was named the Most Valuable Player for the series after twirling a five-hit complete-game shutout in Game 6. Skipper Jack McKeon became the oldest manager ever to win a World Series title. The Marlins became the first opposing team to win a Series championship on the field at Yankee Stadium since 1981, when the Los Angeles Dodgers did it. The Marlins are also the last team to win a World Series at the original Yankee Stadium; the Yankees themselves would not participate in another World Series until 2009, when they defeated the then-defending champion Philadelphia Phillies at the new Yankee Stadium. The Marlins won the series despite scoring fewer runs (17) than the Yankees (21).

=== 2004: Winning season, but no repeat ===
The offseason after their second World Series title, the Marlins made a questionable cost-cutting move as Derrek Lee was traded to Chicago Cubs for Hee-seop Choi and pitcher Mike Nannini. The Marlins also lost key parts of their second championship team, Ugueth Urbina and Iván Rodríguez left via free agency (signed by the Detroit Tigers). Marlins third base coach Ozzie Guillén also departed to be manager of the Chicago White Sox. The Marlins did get good news though as Dontrelle Willis was named NL Rookie of the Year and Jack McKeon named Manager of the Year. They also signed Mike Lowell to a new four-year contract.

After winning the 2003 World Series, the Marlins entered 2004 with high hopes and a retooled roster. Retaining a core of stars from their title team and hoping that newly acquired 1B Hee-seop Choi would emerge, the Marlins fell short of reaching the postseason, but they posted the third winning season in franchise history, boasting an 83–79 record. During the season, the Marlins were to make one of the biggest trades in club history as Los Angeles got P Brad Penny, 1B Choi and Double-A left-hander Bill Murphy in exchange for P Guillermo Mota, C Paul Lo Duca and OF Juan Encarnación. Pitchers Carl Pavano and Armando Benítez turned in record-setting performances. Pavano went 18–8 with a 3.30 ERA, and his 18 wins established a season high by a Marlin. Benitez became the club's season saves leader with 47 (in 51 saves attempts). Pavano, Benitez, Mike Lowell and Miguel Cabrera each enjoyed All-Star seasons, with Cabrera belting 33 homers (second-most ever in a season by a Marlin) while driving in 112 runs.

=== 2005 ===
==== September collapse ====
While losing All-Stars Carl Pavano and Armando Benítez in the off-season, the Marlins signed P Al Leiter and 1B Carlos Delgado. Delgado's contract was the biggest in franchise history at $52 million over 4 years, with an option for a fifth year. Meanwhile, play-by-play TV broadcaster Len Kasper was also lost to the Chicago Cubs and replaced by Rich Waltz (who had previously been with the Seattle Mariners), and radio announcer John "Boog" Sciambi was replaced by Roxy Bernstein.

With the addition of Delgado, many sportswriters expected the Marlins to finish the 2005 season in either first or second place in the NL East. However, at the All-Star break they were 44–42, and the NL East was unusually competitive, as all five of its teams had a winning record at the break. While Cabrera, Willis, and several others posted very good first-half numbers, Lowell was one of the least productive regular major-league starters, and Leiter went 3–7 with an ERA of 6.64 before being traded to the New York Yankees on July 15 for a player to be named later. Additionally, Guillermo Mota, who was acquired by Florida in 2004 along with Paul Lo Duca and Juan Encarnación and was expected to be their closer, was inconsistent, and the Marlins gave the closer job to veteran Todd Jones, whom they signed in the offseason. However, the Marlins did send four players to the All-Star Game (Willis, Lo Duca, Castillo, and Cabrera), tying a team record.

The club was expected to be quite active at the trading deadline (July 31), as Burnett was slated to be a free agent after the season and had already declared his desire to test the market like Pavano did. Burnett was mentioned in possible trades with the Chicago White Sox, Boston Red Sox, New York Yankees, Toronto Blue Jays, and Texas Rangers, with many rumors also including Lowell or Encarnacion. The Marlins did not make a huge move at the deadline, instead trading minor-leaguer Yorman Bazardo to the Seattle Mariners for left-handed pitcher Ron Villone.

The Marlins did, however, have some surprise wins during the season. Dontrelle Willis became the 13th member of the Black Aces when he defeated the Washington Nationals to earn his 20th win. He finished the season 22–10 with a 2.63 ERA, and he was considered a favorite to win the Cy Young Award for much of the season. Also, Jones, a journeyman who had been signed as a setup man, had one of the best years of his career as a closer; he earned 40 saves and had a 2.13 ERA. In addition, late-season call up Jeremy Hermida, a highly regarded prospect who has been compared to the Atlanta Braves' Jeff Francoeur, hit a pinch-hit grand slam in his first major-league at-bat and a game-tying two-run homer in the last game of the season.

The Marlins led the NL wild-card race as late as September 13, then lost 12 of their next 14 games. The Marlins closed the season by sweeping the Braves, and their final record for the season stood at 83–79. After the season, lingering stadium issues forced the Marlins to ponder big moves with their roster and also ponder possible relocation to another city.

==== The "Market Correction" offseason ====
The 2005 offseason would prove to be one of busiest for the Marlins in years. It began with Jack McKeon announcing his retirement on October 2 after the Marlins' last game of the season. Former Tampa Bay Devil Rays manager Lou Piniella, Braves third base coach Fredi González (who previously managed in the Marlins' farm system), New York Yankees bench coach Joe Girardi, and even Yankees manager Joe Torre who most thought could have been let go after a short stint postseason, were named as possible replacements for McKeon. On October 19, Girardi was hired as the new manager. Girardi, who was hired at age 41, became one of the youngest current managers in the major leagues at the time.

Few of the coaching staff, aside from infield/first base coach Perry Hill and bullpen coordinator Pierre Arsenault, were expected to return. Pitching coach Mark Wiley and bullpen coach Luis Dorante came under fire during the season due to the late-season struggles of Burnett and the season-long struggles of the Marlins' bullpen. Similarly, hitting coach Bill Robinson was often blamed for the Marlins' offensive woes throughout the season, and in particular for his failure to get Pierre and Lowell out of season-long slumps. Girardi hired Jim Presley as a replacement for Robinson, and also hired Rick Kranitz as the new pitching coach and Bobby Meacham as the new third-base coach.

On October 3, the first day after the end of the regular season, the Marlins made their first offseason moves, releasing relief pitchers John Riedling and Tim Spooneybarger. Riedling had a 4–1 record and a 7.14 ERA during the season; Spooneybarger, who had not played since 2003 due to rehabilitation from Tommy John surgery, had to have the surgery a second time during the season and missed the 2006 season as well. Screwball specialist Jim Mecir retired following the Marlins' last game of the season.

Closer Todd Jones, pitchers A. J. Burnett, Brian Moehler, Ismael Valdéz, Paul Quantrill, first baseman Jeff Conine, infielder Lenny Harris, outfielder Juan Encarnación, and shortstop Álex González were among the Marlins' players whose contracts expired following the 2005 season. Burnett signed a five-year deal with the Toronto Blue Jays worth $55 million and Jones signed for two years with the Detroit Tigers, while Moehler elected to remain with the Marlins. The team declined to offer arbitration to Conine, Valdéz, Quantrill, Encarnación, Damion Easley, and Mike Mordecai, effectively ending their tenures with the club. Soon after announcing a plan to relocate (see below), the Marlins started to shed payroll by dealing their highest-paid players for minor league prospects, in a series of moves reminiscent of the "fire sale" in the 1997 offseason. In response, the club announced that it was, in their opinion, a "market correction", brought about by the lack of a stadium deal. On November 24, Josh Beckett, Mike Lowell, and Guillermo Mota were traded to the Red Sox for four minor-league prospects: shortstop Hanley Ramírez, and pitchers Aníbal Sánchez, Jesús Delgado, and Harvey García. The trade left Dontrelle Willis as the only remaining member of the team's 2005 Opening Day rotation. The Marlins filled most of the remaining rotation spots with young pitchers such as Jason Vargas, Josh Johnson, and Scott Olsen, all of whom they had recalled from their Class AA affiliate during the 2005 season.

On November 23, the Mets and the Marlins agreed on a deal to move Carlos Delgado to the Mets for first baseman Mike Jacobs and pitching prospect Yusmeiro Petit. Also, the Marlins would have to pay $7 million of Delgado's remaining contract. When the deal was made official the next day, the Marlins also received minor-league infielder Grant Psomas. According to the Fort Lauderdale Sun-Sentinel, the Marlins passed up the Mets' offer to give them center fielder Lastings Milledge, who was at the time ranked the Mets' top prospect according to Baseball America. Combined, the two trades allowed the Marlins to reduce their 2006 payroll by $27 million.

However, the Marlins were not yet done reducing payroll. Paul Lo Duca was traded to the Mets for two players to be named later, with the Marlins sending pitcher Gabriel Hernandez and outfielder Dante Brinkley to New York to complete the deal. Longtime second baseman Luis Castillo was traded to the Twins for pitchers Travis Bowyer and Scott Tyler, and Juan Pierre to the Cubs for pitchers Sergio Mitre, Ricky Nolasco, and Renyel Pinto. Of the seven players that the Marlins acquired in these three deals, only Mitre and Bowyer had any major-league experience when they came to the Marlins. To replace Castillo, the Marlins signed veteran Pokey Reese, but Reese was released during spring training after going AWOL, and was replaced by Dan Uggla, who had been selected from the Arizona Diamondbacks in the Rule 5 draft. Uggla played in the Arizona organization at the Class AA level in 2005.

== 2006–2011: Smaller payrolls, managerial changes, and new stars emerge ==
=== 2006: Rebuilding ===
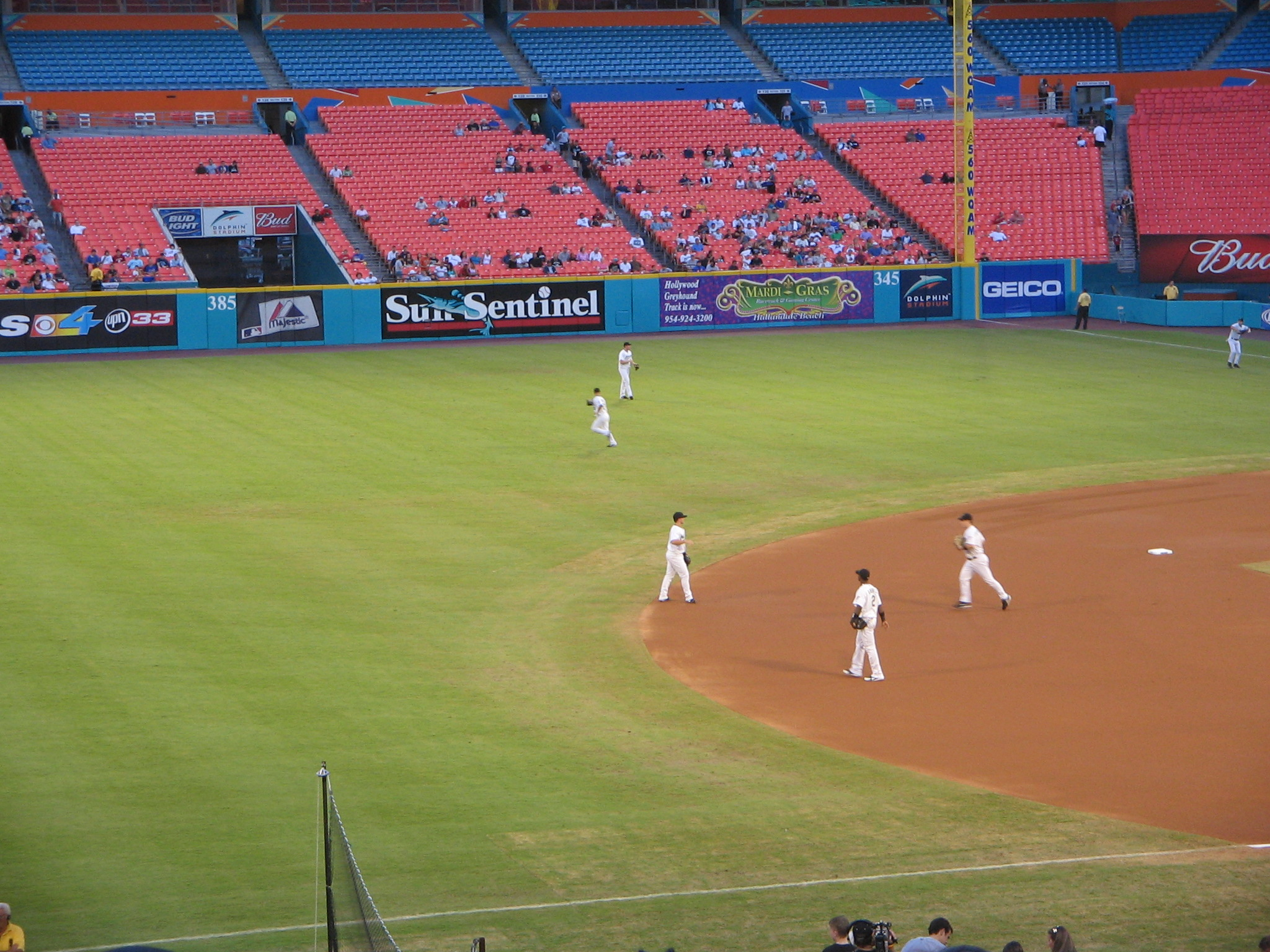
2006 Rebuilt Marlins taking the field in front of a sparse crowd. (counter clockwise) Hermida, Ross, Uggla, Ramírez, and Willingham

At the start of the year, the Marlins had a team salary close to $21 million. Not only was it the lowest team salary in all of MLB, but New York Yankees third baseman Alex Rodriguez alone made more money than the entire Marlins team. The Marlins made MLB history when they started six rookies in their Opening Day lineup. Sporting the league's youngest team, the Marlins were predicted before the season to lose more than 100 games. Instead, the youthful squad greatly exceeded expectations, often in historical fashion. After getting off to an 11–31 start, the Marlins found themselves at 73–72 on September 12, making them the first team in the modern baseball era to improve to better than .500 after being as much as 20 games under .500. Also, for the first time in MLB history, four rookies topped double digits in wins: Josh Johnson, Scott Olsen, Ricky Nolasco and Aníbal Sánchez.

On September 6, 2006, Sanchez threw the fourth no-hitter in franchise history, beating Arizona, 2–0, at Dolphin Stadium. Miguel Cabrera finished second in the N.L. in batting average, and set a franchise season mark with his .339 average. Dan Uggla became the first Rule 5 pick to be selected to the All-Star Game in the season in which he was drafted and won Sporting News Rookie of the Year for the National League and won the Players' Choice award as the league's most outstanding rookie. Hanley Ramírez won the N.L. Rookie of the Year Award, and Joe Girardi was voted N.L. Manager of the Year. Dan Uggla finished third in the voting and starting pitcher Josh Johnson, fourth; starting pitchers Scott Olsen and Aníbal Sánchez and left fielder Josh Willingham received one third-place vote each.

Additionally, the Marlins had four of their rookie starting pitchers (Aníbal Sánchez, Josh Johnson, Scott Olsen, and Ricky Nolasco) win at least ten games, becoming the first team in major-league history to do so. The 2006 Marlins also had five ten-game winners for the first time in franchise history (including Dontrelle Willis).

Shortly after the 2006 season ended and following months of speculation, Marlins manager Joe Girardi was fired on October 3, 2006, not long after winning the National League Manager of the Year award. This was due to a game against the Los Angeles Dodgers earlier in the year in which Girardi did not challenge a call that pitcher Taylor Tankersley thought was a strike and this prompted owner Jeffrey Loria, who was in the stands and a few feet away from the dugout, to call out Girardi who refused to listen to him. This was not the only thing that triggered the feud; earlier in the year Girardi reportedly wanted first baseman Mike Jacobs to start off the year in Triple-A, Willingham to start at catcher, Miguel Cabrera to start at first base. Within hours, Atlanta Braves third base coach Fredi González was named his replacement and was signed to a three-year contract.

=== 2007: Injuries deplete the Fish ===
After a 2006 season which saw them defy expectations time and again, the Marlins entered 2007 hanging on to the belief that they could compete with anyone. It did not turn out that way. Injuries ravaged the starting rotation and the Marlins struggled all season, ultimately finishing in last place in the National League East for the first time since 1999. Josh Johnson underwent Tommy John surgery and Aníbal Sánchez had right shoulder surgery. Ricky Nolasco dealt with a sore elbow all season. Suddenly, the strength of the team—the starting rotation—was minus three key players. Despite a disappointing finish, there certainly were a number of highs—Kevin Gregg emerged as a dominant closer, Hanley Ramírez developed into a legitimate superstar and Miguel Cabrera proved why he already was one—but none of them could ultimately overcome the odds heavily stacked against the Marlins. On the downside, southpaws Dontrelle Willis and Scott Olsen had disappointing campaigns. What was encouraging was an otherwise disappointing season ended on a high note. The team won five of six to end the season (sweeping the Cubs and taking two of three with the Mets at Shea Stadium). Still, after the season, the franchise went in a different direction. The year was capped by the trading of their two biggest stars, slugger Miguel Cabrera and pitcher Dontrelle Willis. Talks with both the Los Angeles Angels and San Francisco Giants fell apart. On December 5, 2007, the Marlins agreed to the terms of a trade with the Detroit Tigers. The trade would surprisingly send not only Cabrera, but also Willis, to the Tigers. In return, the Marlins did not receive four players, but six. The Marlins received center fielder Cameron Maybin, catcher Mike Rabelo, and pitchers Andrew Miller, Eulogio De La Cruz, Burke Badenhop, and Dallas Trahern.

The Marlins did have some bright spots on offense as they set club records for runs scored (790), hits (1,504), doubles (340), home runs (201), RBIs (749) and slugging percentage (.448). As the Marlins wrapped up the season they announced that pitching coach Rick Kranitz would not be back with the club and extended Larry Beinfest and Michael Hill to long-term deals that run through 2015 along with promotions to President of Baseball Operations and Vice President/General Manager, respectively.

=== 2008: Back to .500 baseball ===
The Marlins began 2008 on a positive note. Analysts expected a lackluster performance on the field, citing the low payroll and loss of Dontrelle Willis and Miguel Cabrera during the offseason. However, the Marlins got off to one of the best starts in team history. At one point the Marlins were 30–20, the first time since September 14, 2005, the team had been 10 games over .500. They jumped atop of the National League East in April and May, the first time since 2002 that they held the lead that late in the season. The good start was attributed to powerful offensive production from their core of Mike Jacobs, Hanley Ramírez, Dan Uggla, Josh Willingham, and Jorge Cantú and quality pitching by southpaw Scott Olsen and right-hander Ricky Nolasco. The Marlins' hot start made them a rare buyer at the July trade deadline, where they were involved in talks on a three-way deal with the Pittsburgh Pirates and Boston Red Sox which could have brought Manny Ramírez to South Florida. The Marlins backed out at the last second when trade talks turned to their coveted power-hitting prospect, Giancarlo Stanton. Instead, Manny Ramírez ended up with the Dodgers and the Marlins wound up trading for Arthur Rhodes.

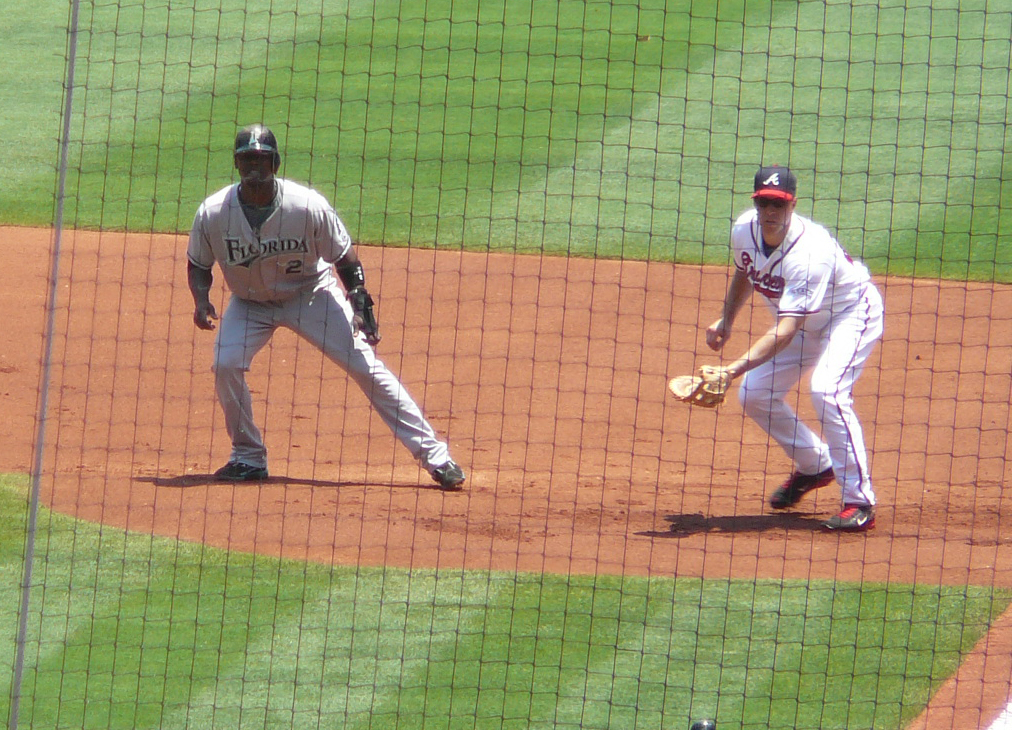
Ramírez (left) leading off first against the Atlanta Braves in 2008

The team also received encouraging news when injured pitcher Josh Johnson made a fast recovery from Tommy John surgery and Aníbal Sánchez came back from a torn labrum in the shoulder, both leaping into the rotation right away along with newly called up prized prospect Chris Volstad. In addition, the Marlins sent two players, Hanley Ramírez, who started the game at shortstop, and reserve Dan Uggla to the last All-Star Game at Yankee Stadium. The Marlins signed Hanley Ramírez to a 6-year, $70 million deal, making him the richest Marlin in history.

The team struggled in the month of August, when they went 11–16 due to lack of the offense they had in the early part of the season. In September, the Marlins rallied with a nine-game winning streak, tying the franchise record, thanks in part to prized prospect, Cameron Maybin. However they lost four straight afterwards and were eliminated from playoff contention, although but they did manage to eliminate the New York Mets for the second consecutive season on the final day, winning the final game at Shea Stadium, 4–2.

The team finished with a franchise record for most home runs in a season at 208. Mike Jacobs, Dan Uggla, Hanley Ramírez and Jorge Cantú made MLB history by becoming the first foursome of infielders to hit at least 25 homers in a season. Just a day after the World Series concluded, the Marlins began wheeling and dealing. They traded first baseman Mike Jacobs to the Royals for reliever Leo Núñez, who the Marlins hoped could become a setup-man in late innings. A few weeks later, the Marlins traded power hitting outfielder Josh Willingham and southpaw Scott Olsen to the Nationals for utility player Emilio Bonifacio and two minor leaguers. Soon after the Marlins traded closer Kevin Gregg to the Cubs for relief prospect José Ceda.

=== 2009: Falling short ===
A few weeks before the regular season, the Florida Marlins' 15-year quest for a permanent home became a reality by agreeing to bankroll a big share of a $634 million stadium complex to rise on the grounds of the old Orange Bowl site. The Marlins hoped to open at the new stadium on Opening Day 2012 with a new name of Miami Marlins.

The Marlins kicked off the new season with the youngest team in baseball and with the lowest payroll for the fourth consecutive season. New leadoff man Emilio Bonifacio stole the show on Opening Day. He hit the first Opening Day inside-the-park home run since Carl Yastrzemski did it for the Boston Red Sox in 1968 and had three stolen bases to go along with four hits. Hanley Ramírez hit his first career grand slam as the Marlins went on to score 12 runs, the most ever in franchise history on Opening Day.

The Marlins started the 2009 season hot by sweeping the Washington Nationals, only the second time they started the season with sweep since the 1997 Marlins team. The Marlins won their first four games for the first time in franchise history and started 11–1, which included 2 out of 3 wins from the Mets, the first Marlins franchise sweep at Turner Field, and three comeback late-inning wins against the Nationals in Washington, sweeping the teams' second series matchup. The 11–1 start was the best start in Marlins history. They then lost their next seven games starting with the 62–99 Pittsburgh Pirates making them the first team in NL history to win seven straight games then lose the next seven. But even though they were below .500 by as many as five games, they rebounded to 2 games above .500 as of July 1, 2009. Cody Ross, the leader of the rebound, hit 2 grand slams in 2 weeks. The Marlins also amazed many in the final series before the All-Star break against the Arizona Diamondbacks. Originally trailing by seven runs after five innings, the Marlins entered the eighth inning down 7–4, they sent 14 batters to the plate. In the benchmark frame, they collected eight hits, and had eight different players score for a total of ten runs in the inning. In all the Marlins collected 14 unanswered runs as they came back for their 21st come from behind victory of the season. After the first 100 games of the season they stood second in the NL East with a record of 52–48.

Coming out of the All-Star break, the Marlins were swept in three games by the Phillies, but they responded by sweeping the Padres in San Diego before taking two of three against the Dodgers. That 5–1 West Coast road trip—from July 20–26—reinforced to management that the team was in contention. Instead of being sellers at the July 31 non-waiver trade deadline, first baseman Nick Johnson was acquired from the Nationals for pitching prospect Aaron Thompson, in the hopes that Johnson would bring his renowned plate discipline to the forefront of the Marlins' lineup. However other rumors began to surface that the team was exploring options in deals that would bring major players to Florida, including superstars Roy Halladay and Adrián González, as well as closer Heath Bell.

In August, the Marlins offense would take off. Rookie Chris Coghlan set a club record with ten consecutive multihit games. In addition, the Marlins would set a team record with 14 consecutive games with 10 or more hits, becoming the first team since the 1937 St. Louis Browns to reach that milestone. August would also see the Marlins sweeping the division leading Philadelphia Phillies after getting swept by the division cellar Washington Nationals. In light of being in the playoff race, the Marlins were rumored to have been targeting veteran pitchers John Smoltz and ex-Marlin Brad Penny. The Marlins ended the 2009 Season with their 3rd best record in franchise history, 87–75, topped only by the 1997 (92 wins) and 2003 (91) World Series championship teams. However, the status of Fredi González for the 2010 season was put in question when a report by ESPN's Buster Olney said the Marlins had made contact with Bobby Valentine. The Marlins put those rumors to rest days later confirming that the all-time winningest manager in franchise history would remain at the helm. On the other hand, pitching coach Mark Wiley and infield/first-base coach Andy Fox were not retained.

Soon after the World Series, the Marlins began their off-season. On November 5, Jeremy Hermida was dealt to the Boston Red Sox in exchange for two prospects, pitchers Hunter Jones and José Álvarez. The team also saw a higher number of awards handed out to the team, as Ramirez notched his second straight Silver Slugger award, and Chris Coghlan was named the National League Rookie of the Year. Miami native and Marlins' Special Assistant to the President Andre Dawson was elected by the eligible members of the Baseball Writers' Association of America to the 2010 Class of the Baseball Hall of Fame. Dawson played with the Marlins in his final two seasons (1995 & 1996) The Marlins were also active on the international front, targeting and offering Cuban defector Aroldis Chapman a five-year offer worth $16 million, but lost out to the Cincinnati Reds, who signed the heralded lefty for $30 million for over six years.

=== 2010: Rookie emergence ===
The Marlins announced in a statement on January 5, 2010, in preparation for the move to the new ballpark and name change, that the Marlins road jersey would no longer bear the name "Florida" on the front. Also the "F" marlin sleeve patch would no longer be on the jersey.

On January 12, 2010, as part of an agreement between Major League Baseball and the players' union, the Marlins agreed to increase payroll in line with the money it receives each year from revenue sharing. It could have meant that the Marlins would be more inclined to hang on to All-Star second baseman Dan Uggla rather than trade him as they had been trying to do for several months. A few days after agreeing with MLB to increase payroll, the Marlins signed their ace right-hander, Josh Johnson to a four-year deal worth $39 million, the second biggest contract ever for a pitcher heading into his second salary arbitration year. The only bigger deal was signed by Johan Santana, then of the Twins, for $40 million over four years. The deal locked up the team's pitching ace beyond the opening of the new stadium in 2012, along with Hanley Ramírez. Not too long after the deal, the Marlins avoided arbitration with all-star second baseman Dan Uggla by signing a one-year, $7.8 million deal which was the third-highest single season total in franchise history behind Iván Rodríguez's $10 million in 2003 and Gary Sheffield's $14.9 million in 1998.

Coming out of spring training, there were playoff aspirations for the Marlins, which had held the same nucleus since 2006 despite the fact they had the National League's third-lowest payroll. Marlins owner Jeffrey Loria expressed high hopes saying, "I expect us to make the playoffs, we've got all the ammunition we need."

However, those aspirations proved to be misplaced, as little went right in Miami. In mid-May, Hanley Ramírez was suspended for a game by manager Fredi González for not hustling towards a fly ball which cost the team runs and a loss. Nearly two weeks later, Roy Halladay threw a perfect game against Florida, which was the first one thrown against the Marlins in franchise history.

On June 23, with the team sitting at 34–36 along with having a shaky bullpen and inconsistent situational hitting and bench, Loria decided to fire Fredi González along with bench coach Carlos Tosca and hitting coach Jim Presley on June 23. At the time of his dismissal, González's record for the season was 32–34. Edwin Rodriguez was promoted from Triple-A New Orleans as Florida's new manager. Sandwiched between those two announcements were talks with former Rangers and Mets manager Bobby Valentine but those talks broke down. Edwin Rodriguez's first game was a June 23 win against the Baltimore Orioles.

Other disappointments came in the way of injuries to core players, Chris Coghlan, the 2009 NL Rookie of the Year, tore the meniscus in his left knee while jamming a shaving-cream pie in Wes Helms' face. Ricky Nolasco tore the meniscus in his right knee when he took off a shoe. When all was said and done, a club-record 57 players rotated through the clubhouse.

At the All-Star Break, Hanley Ramírez participated in the State Farm Home Run Derby and became the first Marlin to reach the finals. Ramirez lost to David Ortiz but set a Marlins record for most home runs hit in the Derby with 26.

After the All-Star Break, the Marlins went on a surge, getting off to an 11–5 start thanks in large part to Dan Uggla, who also set a Marlins franchise record for total home runs at 144, passing Mike Lowell. In that same week (July 19–July 25), the Marlins had four walk-off base hits, two by Donnie Murphy and one each from Ronny Paulino and Wes Helms. It was that week which brought up the need to be buyers at the trade deadline. Considered in contention for the playoffs, the Marlins traded Rick VandenHurk to the Baltimore Orioles for lefty Will Ohman to shore up a shaky bullpen.

The second half also saw the emergence of rookie outfielders Michael Stanton and Logan Morrison, who replaced the injured Chris Coghlan. Rookie first baseman Gaby Sánchez also put up good numbers, at the top of most lists in home runs, RBIs, and batting average, to contend for the NL Rookie of the Year award.

The Marlins 2010 season was considered a disappointment, as they finished under .500 for the first time since 2007.

==== Off-season changes ====
Soon after the World Series, the team began its offseason on trying to improve its defense and bullpen while filling a dire need at catcher. Out of the gate, the Florida Marlins became one of the most active teams on the market. After retaining Edwin Rodríguez and bringing back defensive guru Perry Hill, the team traded the disappointing results of the notorious Miguel Cabrera–Dontrelle Willis trade. Andrew Miller was the first to go when he was traded to the Boston Red Sox on November 12 in exchange for another lefty, Dustin Richardson, a relief pitcher. The next day, the team shipped out young center fielder Cameron Maybin to the San Diego Padres for relief pitchers Ryan Webb and Edward Mujica to help in the expected overhaul of the team's disappointing bullpen.

As soon as the season ended, the team began negotiations for a long-term deal that would keep All-Star second baseman Dan Uggla with the team. After rejecting the team's offer of $48 million over four years because of his desire for a fifth year totaling $71 million, the team reached a stalemate with Uggla, meaning his days with the team were numbered. Days later on November 16, in order to get some kind of return for Uggla, the team dealt him to their divisional rivals, the Atlanta Braves, for fellow All-Star and utility man Omar Infante and relief pitcher Mike Dunn.

Earlier in that same day, the team came to terms on a three-year deal with All-Star catcher John Buck, formerly of the Kansas City Royals and Toronto Blue Jays. With even more money left to spend, the team later signed free agent pitcher Javier Vázquez to a one-year, $7 million contract which had a no-trade clause. It signaled a change in the philosophy of the franchise who had not made such a free agent signing since 2005 when they had signed Carlos Delgado to a multi-year contract.

The team was not done yet, as they signed yet another of their current players to an extension. Ricky Nolasco agreed to a three-year deal that would pay him $26.5 million through 2013, making him one of five players on the roster with a multi-year contract (the others being Hanley Ramírez, Josh Johnson, John Buck, and Randy Choate).

=== 2011: Short-lived resurgence ===
After the Marlins began the season with the best start in franchise history through 50 games (30–20), they had one of the worst runs in MLB history. Starting the month of June with a .053 winning percentage (1–18), manager Edwin Rodríguez resigned, and the Marlins hired former manager and special assistant to the GM Jack McKeon. The Marlins finished the month at a franchise worst 5–23, but began July at 10–4. The Marlins dropped from the second-best record in the National League to last place in the National League East. In the final 112 games of the season, the Marlins played 42–70, finishing with 72 wins and 90 losses, last in the National League East.

== 2012–2017: Move to Miami, continued struggles, tragedy ==
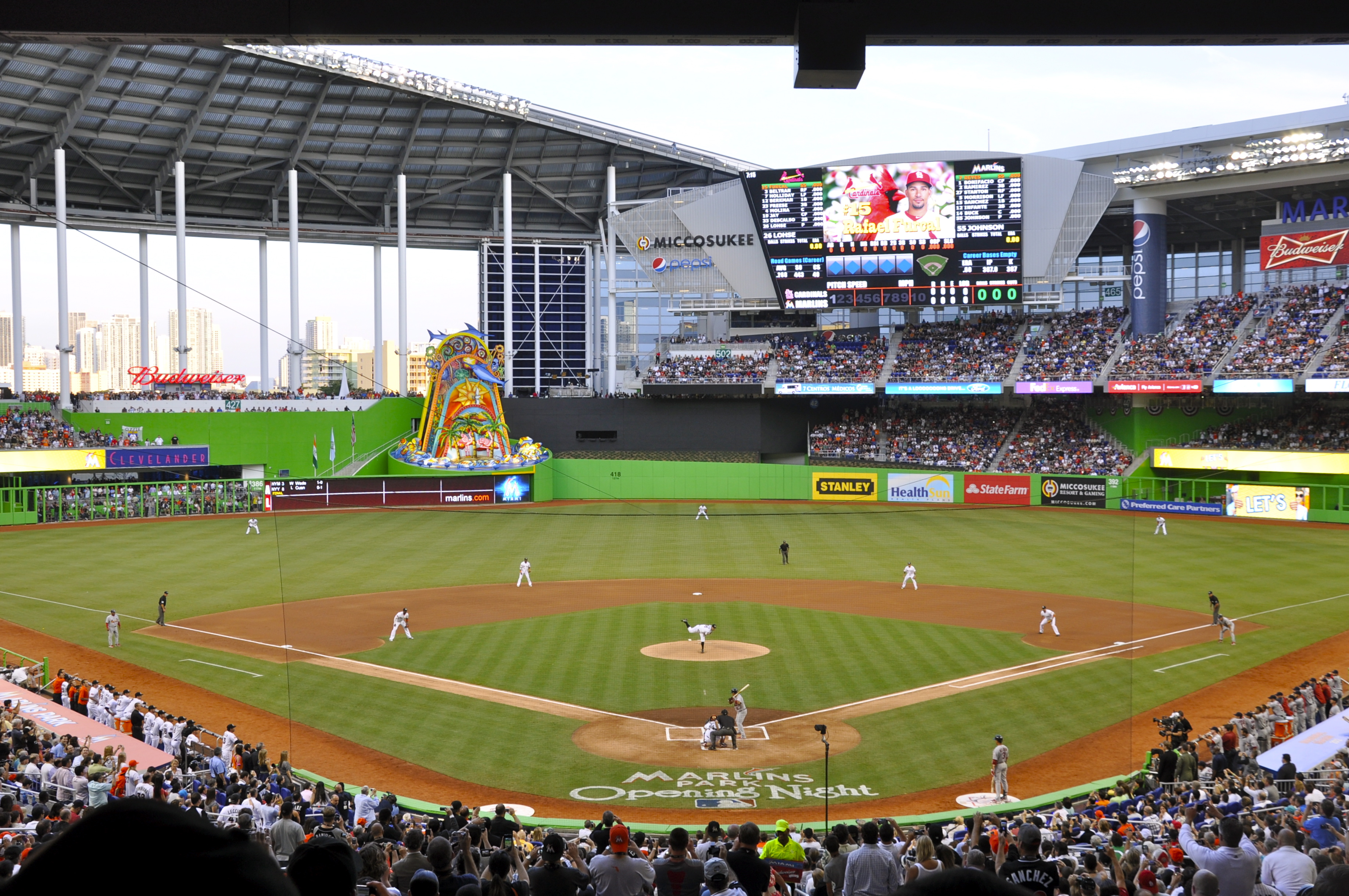
The Miami Marlins in front of a sellout crowd at the inaugural Opening Night game at Marlins Park against the reigning World champion St. Louis Cardinals

In September 2011, the Marlins acquired manager Ozzie Guillén in a trade with the Chicago White Sox. They signed several high-profile free agents during the off-season in Jose Reyes, Heath Bell, and former White Sox pitcher Mark Buehrle, who played for Ozzie Guillén from 2004 to 2011.

The 2012 season marked the debut of the team's new ballpark, Marlins Park. Per an agreement with the city, the team underwent a rebranding as the Miami Marlins, adopting a new logo, team colors, and uniforms. The Marlins opened their new stadium and the 2012 season against the St. Louis Cardinals on April 4, losing 4–1. The Marlins struggled through the first 100 games, only winning 46, despite going a franchise record 21–8 through May, resulting in the trades of Omar Infante, Aníbal Sánchez, and Hanley Ramírez. The team finished 69–93, its worst record since 1999. This resulted in Guillén being fired after one season. Mike Redmond succeeded him as the Marlins' manager. There was another fire sale, with the sale of almost every other major Marlins player of 2012 but Giancarlo Stanton.

In 2013, the team started the season with consecutive losses to the Washington Nationals, 0–2, 0–3, and 1–6. The Marlins finished 62–100, the second 100-loss season for the team, and the first since 1998. However, the season ended on a good note, as the Marlins, already out of contention, beat the Detroit Tigers as Henderson Álvarez threw the franchise's fifth no-hitter in a 1–0 season-ending victory at Marlins Park and José Fernández won the NL Rookie of the Year.

Prior to the 2014 season, the Marlins acquired several hitters in an attempt to supplement their strong pitching and defense, including Garrett Jones, Casey McGehee, Jarrod Saltalamacchia and Rafael Furcal. The Marlins finished 77–85 in 2014, losing both José Fernández and Giancarlo Stanton to major injuries. After the season's conclusion, Stanton was signed to the largest contract in MLB history: 13 years and $325 million. The Marlins then acquired Aaron Crow from the Kansas City Royals, Dee Gordon and Dan Haren from the Los Angeles Dodgers, and Mat Latos from the Cincinnati Reds and then signed free agents Michael Morse and Ichiro Suzuki, who became the first-ever Japanese-born Marlin in franchise history.

With the Marlins' talented roster, they entered the 2015 season with high expectations. However, after beginning the season 16–22, Redmond was fired from the Marlins' managerial position on May 17. Then-general manager Dan Jennings replaced Redmond as manager, despite Jennings having never previously coached or managed in any MLB organization.

On September 25, 2016, the Marlins were dealt a tragic setback when pitcher José Fernández was killed in a boating crash. The day after his death, the Marlins paid tribute to Fernández by having every player wear his jersey in a 7–3 victory over the New York Mets. Dee Strange-Gordon led off the bottom of the first inning with a home run and broke down in tears as he circled the bases.

== 2018–present: Jeter and Sherman era ==
In 2017, Jeffrey Loria advertised for bids to sell the Miami Marlins. Former New York Yankees shortstop Derek Jeter expressed interest in being involved with an ownership group, attempting initially to join a bid with former Florida Governor Jeb Bush. Eventually, he became a minority partner in the eventual winning bid, a $1.2 billion offer led by Bruce Sherman, which was accepted on August 11, 2017. Jeter became the team's new CEO. The bid was officially submitted to Major League Baseball for analysis and approval on August 15. Jeter and Sherman immediately held a complete fire sale, in an attempt to bring the franchise back to profitability, trading away Marcell Ozuna to the Cardinals and Giancarlo Stanton to the Yankees.

On November 16, 2018, the team unveiled a new logo, colors, and uniforms for the 2019 season, replacing the "rainbow" M used since the move to Marlins Park with a new logo featuring a red, blue, grey, and black color scheme. The new branding was described as "[capturing] the energy and diversity of Miami". In their first season with the new branding, the Marlins finished with a 57–105 record, their worst since 1998. They were one of four teams to not appear in the playoffs during the 2010s, joining the Padres, White Sox, and Mariners.

On September 25, 2020, during the pandemic-shortened 2020 season, the Marlins defeated the New York Yankees 4–3 to clinch their first postseason berth since their 2003 World Series championship. They finished the season with a 31–29 record, their first winning season since 2009. The team won the National League Wild Card Series over the Chicago Cubs, 2–0, but were swept in the next round at the hands of the Atlanta Braves, 3–0, giving the Marlins their first playoff series loss in team history.

During the offseason, Michael Hill was let go as president of baseball operations. On November 13, 2020, the Marlins became the first club in any American major-level sports league to hire a woman to an executive position when Kim Ng was announced as the team's general manager. In addition, she was also the MLB's first Asian American general manager. In the franchise's first season under Ng, the Marlins went 67–95 and finished fourth in the NL East. In 2022, Sandy Alcántara was unanimously selected as the winner of the NL Cy Young Award, becoming the first pitcher in Marlins history to win the award. Nevertheless, the Marlins finished fourth in their division for the second year in a row.

On February 28, 2022, Jeter announced that he would no longer serve as CEO of the Marlins or hold any shares in the club. After more than four years as the Miami Marlins' chief executive, he ended the relationship and sold his 4% ownership in the team.

Following the 2022 season, the offseason saw the addition of AL batting champion Luis Arraez in a trade that sent the Marlins #2 pitcher, Pablo López, to the Minnesota Twins. Manager Skip Schumaker was brought in to replace Don Mattingly.

The 2023 season culminated in an 84-78 record in which the Marlins made the postseason, in a full season, for the first time since 2003. While Alcántara had an off-year on the mound with a 7-10 record, the emergence of the rest of the pitching staff picked up the slack. The pitching was needed as the offensive output had not improved much from its anemic showing in the 2022 season. In spite of their regular season success, the season would end in a 2-0 series loss to the Phillies in the wild card round.
