= West Michigan Whitecaps =

American Minor League baseball team

- Founded in 1982 in Madison, Wisconsin; Based in Comstock Park, Michigan since 1994

Team logo	Cap insignia

Minor league affiliations
- Class: High-A (2021–present)
- Previous classes: Class A (1994–2020)
- League: Midwest League (1994–present)
- Division: East Division

Major league affiliations
- Team: Detroit Tigers (1997–present)
- Previous teams: Oakland Athletics (1994–1996)

Minor league titles
- League titles (7): 1996; 1998; 2004; 2006; 2007; 2015; 2025
- Division titles (7): 1996; 1998; 2004; 2006; 2007; 2015; 2025
- First-half titles (1): 2025
- Second-half titles (1): 2025

Team data
- Name: West Michigan Whitecaps (1994–present)
- Colors: Navy, medium blue, light blue, white
- Ballpark: LMCU Ballpark (1994–present)
- Owner(s)/ Operator(s): Lew Chamberlin and Denny Baxter
- General manager: Jim Jarecki
- Manager: René Rivera
- Website: milb.com/west-michigan

The West Michigan Whitecaps are a Minor League Baseball team of the Midwest League and the High-A affiliate of the Detroit Tigers. They are located in Comstock Park, Michigan, a suburb of Grand Rapids, and play their home games at LMCU Ballpark.

== Franchise history ==
The Midwest League came to the Grand Rapids area in 1994 upon the arrival of the former Madison Muskies. Local businessmen Lew Chamberlin and Dennis Baxter bought the Muskies and moved them to West Michigan. They were the first minor league team in the Grand Rapids area since the Grand Rapids Jets folded in 1951. The Whitecaps were affiliated with the Oakland Athletics before they joined the Tigers' farm system in 1997.

Their home ballpark is LMCU Ballpark in Comstock Park. Before the 2002 season it was known as Old Kent Park; the name was changed when the park's title sponsor, Old Kent Bank, was purchased by Fifth Third Bank. Before the 2021 season, the Lake Michigan Credit Union renamed the venue "LMCU Ballpark". The team's official mascots are Crash the River Rascal, Roxy the River Rascal and Franky the Swimming Pig.

The franchise's attendance record of 547,401 was set in 1996.

Several league and team records were set during the 2006 season. The team posted the second best record in franchise history, going 89–48, including going 23–6 in July. Michael Hollimon hit 3 home runs in one game. Cameron Maybin hit 2 grand slams in the season. Michael Hernandez became the first person in the history of the Midwest League to hit for the cycle twice. The Whitecaps went on to defeat the Kane County Cougars in four games to win their fourth Midwest League Championship.

In 2009, the team drew the attention of the Physicians Committee for Responsible Medicine after a 4-pound (1.8 kg), 4,800-calorie hamburger called the Fifth Third Burger was placed on the menu of the team's concession stand. It was so named in part for the ballpark sponsor and part for its 1.6666 (or 5/3) pounds of meat. The Committee requested that the team put a label on the burger indicating that it was a "dietary disaster". To date, more than 100 fans, or about a half of the people who have attempted the challenge, have conquered the burger and earned a commemorative T-shirt. On July 15, 2009, Travel Channel's "Man v. Food" and its host Adam Richman came to Fifth Third Ballpark to attempt to conquer the burger in an episode of the popular show. The episode aired on September 30, 2009, wherein he successfully met the challenge. In 2012, The Whitecaps installed a new scoreboard and high resolution video display screen which was installed by TS Sports out of Dallas, Texas.

On January 3, 2014, a fire started in one of the suites. It spread and caused extensive damage, close to one half of the suites and 1st base concourse were destroyed. Thanks to extensive work, the park was restored and up and running by opening day.

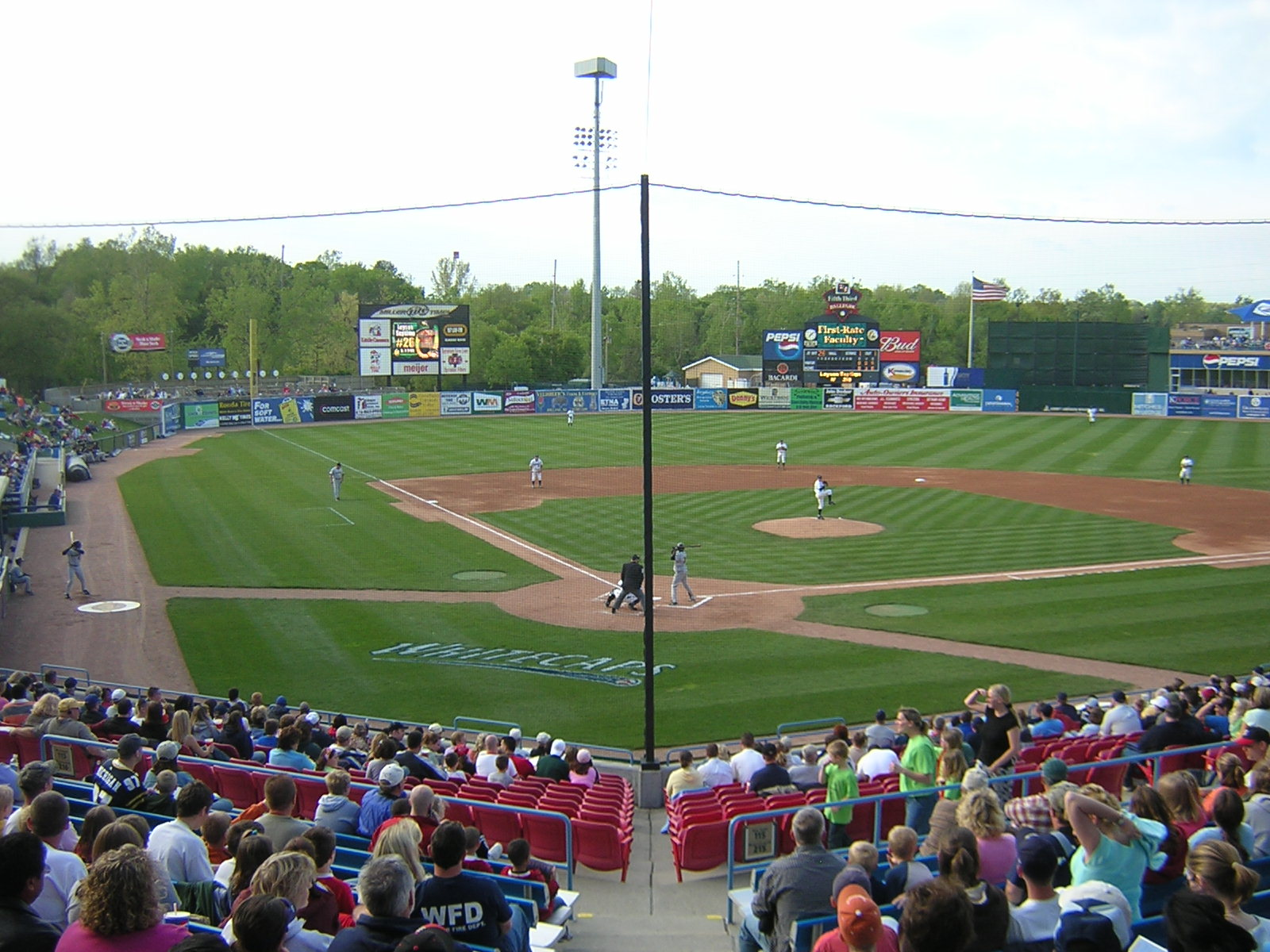
Whitecaps at home in Fifth Third Ballpark

In conjunction with Major League Baseball's restructuring of Minor League Baseball in 2021, the Whitecaps were organized into the High-A Central. In 2022, the High-A Central became known as the Midwest League, the name historically used by the regional circuit prior to the 2021 reorganization.

In 2025, the Whitecaps won the Minor League Baseball Organization of the Year Award.

== Regular season ==
Season	W	L	Pct.	
1994	74	65	.532	
1995	67	69	.492	
1996	77	61	.557	MWL Champions
1997	92	39	.702	
1998	83	57	.593	MWL Champions
1999	68	72	.485	
2000	88	52	.629	
2001	65	72	.474	
2002	83	57	.593	
2003	67	73	.478	
2004	69	70	.496	MWL Champions
2005	73	70	.510	
2006	89	48	.649	MWL Champions
2007	83	57	.593	MWL Champions
2008	73	76	.532	
2009	83	57	.593	
2010	62	77	.446	
2011	70	69	.504	
2012	72	68	.514	
2013	69	70	.496	
2014	82	58	.586	
2015	75	64	.540	MWL Champions
2016	71	65	.522	
2017	91	45	.669	
2018	69	70	.496	
2019	49	90	.353	
2021	58	62	.483	
2022	72	59	.550	
2023	68	62	.523	
2024	68	63	.519	
2025	92	39	.702	MWL Champions

== Postseason ==
The Whitecaps won the best-of-five Midwest League championship six times in six opportunities. They defeated the Wisconsin Timber Rattlers in 1996, the Rockford Cubbies in 1998, the Kane County Cougars twice (2004 and 2006), the Beloit Snappers in 2007, and the Cedar Rapids Kernels twice, in 2015 and again in 2025. West Michigan is 59–32 all-time in playoff games.

=== Oakland Athletics affiliation ===
Year	Record	Results	Opponents
1994	0–2	Lost in First Round	Rockford (0–2)
1995	3–3	Lost in Second Round	Kane County (2–1), Michigan (1–2)
1996	7–2	Won Championship	Lansing (2–1), Rockford (2–0), Wisconsin (3–1)

=== Detroit Tigers affiliation ===
Year	Record	Results	Opponents
1997	0–2	Lost in First Round	Fort Wayne (0–2)
1998	7–2	Won Championship	Michigan (2–1), Clinton (2–0), Rockford (3–1)
2000	1–2	Lost in First Round	Dayton (1–2)
2002	3–2	Lost in Second Round	Dayton (2–0), Lansing (1–2)
2004	7–3	Won Championship	Lansing (2–1), South Bend (2–0), Kane County (3–2)
2005	2–2	Lost in Second Round	Fort Wayne (2–0), South Bend (0–2)
2006	7–2	Won Championship	Fort Wayne (2–1), Lansing (2–0), Kane County (3–1)
2007	7–2	Won Championship	Lansing (2–0), South Bend (2–0), Beloit (3–2)
2014	1–2	Lost in First Round	Fort Wayne (1–2)
2015	7–3	Won Championship	Fort Wayne (2–0), Lansing (2–1), Cedar Rapids (3–2)
2016	3–3	Lost in Second Round	South Bend (2–1), Great Lakes (1–2)
2017	1-2	Lost in First Round	Dayton (1-2)
2018	2-2	Lost in Second Round	Great Lakes (2-0), Bowling Green (0-2)
2025	4-0	Won Championship	Lake County (2–0), Cedar Rapids (2-0)

== Managers ==
Since 1994, the Whitecaps have had nine managers. In 2007, former Tigers' third baseman Tom Brookens became the fifth manager in the history of the Whitecaps.

Listed here is each manager and their won/loss record:

=== Detroit Tigers affiliation ===
- Bruce Fields 1997–2000 (331–220)
- Brent Gates 2001 (65–72)
- Phil Regan 2002–2003 (150–130)
- Matt Walbeck 2004–2006 (231–179)
- Tom Brookens 2007 (83–57)
- Joe DePastino 2008–2010 (215–201)
- Ernie Young 2011–2012 (142–135)
- Larry Parrish 2013 (69-70)
- Andrew Graham 2014–2016 (228-187)
- Mike Rabelo 2017 (91-45)
- Lance Parrish 2018-2019 (118-160)
- Brayan Peña 2020-2023 (198-183)
- Tony Cappuccilli 2024–present

== Roster ==
West Michigan Whitecaps roster
Players	Coaches/Other
Pitchers: 17 Max Alba #; 29 Logan Berrier; 39 Thomas Bruss; 31 Rayner Castillo; 9 Charlie Christensen; 20 Lucas Elissalt; 32 Jalen Evans; 18 Colin Fields #; 19 Ryan Harvey; 15 Preston Howey; 5 Ben Jacobs; 38 Zack Lee; 36 Carlos Lequerica; 16 Carlos Marcano; 22 Eliseo Mota; 21 Inohan Paniagua; 38 Tarik Skubal * #; 28 Ethan Sloan; 40 Luke Stofel; 34 Juanmi Vasquez; 35 CJ Weins; Catchers: 25 Clayton Campbell; 12 Enderson Delgado; 24 Ricardo Hurtado; Infielders: 1 Samuel Gil; 6 Woody Hadeen; 14 Juan Hernandez; 2 Bryce Rainer; 8 Cristian Santana; Outfielders: 11 Roberto Campos; 11 Stephen Hrustich; 9 Nolan McCarthy; 23 Caleb Shpur; 26 Andrew Sojka; 13 Jackson Strong	Manager: 44 René Rivera; Coaches: 30 Matt Malott (hitting); 43 Daniel Ricabal (pitching); 10 Cole Roberts (bench); 60-day injured list: 37 Gabriel Reyes; 7-day injured list; * On Detroit Tigers 40-man roster; ~ Development list; # Rehab assignment; ∞ Reserve list; ‡ Restricted list; § Suspended list; † Temporarily inactive list; Roster updated July 10, 2026; Transactions; → More rosters: MiLB • Midwest League; → Detroit Tigers minor league players

== Former Whitecaps in the majors ==
Below is a list of West Michigan Whitecaps who have played in the major leagues.

=== Oakland Athletics affiliation (1994–1996) ===
- Benito Baez 1996
- Jason Beverlin 1995
- Emil Brown 1995
- Ryan Christenson 1996
- Steve Cox 1994
- D. T. Cromer 1994
- Jeff D'Amico 1994, 1995
- Jeff DaVanon 1996
- Mario Encarnacion 1996
- Ben Grieve 1995
- Ramon Hernandez 1996
- Tim Kubinski 1994
- Jason McDonald 1994
- Chris Michalak 1994
- Willie Morales 1994
- Juan Moreno 1996
- David Newhan 1995
- Derrick White 1996
- George Williams 1994

=== Detroit Tigers affiliation (1997–present) ===
- Burke Badenhop 2006
- Adam Bernero 1999
- Willie Blair 1997 Pitched one game on rehab assignment
- Brennan Boesch 2007
- Jeremy Bonderman 2009 Pitched one game on rehab assignment
- Dave Borkowski 1997
- Brent Clevlen 2003
- Francisco Cordero 1997
- Nate Cornejo 1999
- Casey Crosby 2009
- Freddy Dolsi 2005
- Eulogio de la Cruz 2004
- Eric Eckenstahler 2000
- Robert Fick 1997
- Jason Frasor 1999, 2000
- Tony Giarratano 2004
- Curtis Granderson 2008 Played three games on rehab assignment
- Jack Hannahan 2001
- Michael Hollimon 2006
- Omar Infante 2000
- Brandon Inge 1999
- Matt Joyce 2006
- Jair Jurrjens 2005
- Kris Keller 1999
- Don Kelly 2002
- Rodney Lindsey 1998
- Nook Logan 2001
- Shane Loux 1998, 1999
- Bobby Lynch 2014
- Cameron Maybin 2006
- Matt Miller 1998
- Dave Mlicki 2000 Pitched one game on rehab assignment
- Brian Moehler 2000 Pitched one game on rehab assignment
- Scott Moore 2003
- Eric Munson 1999
- Magglio Ordóñez 2008 Played one game on rehab assignment
- Adam Pettyjohn 1998
- Luis Pineda 1999
- Mike Rabelo 2002, 2003
- Ryan Raburn 2002, 2003
- Mike Rivera 1998
- Fernando Rodney 2000
- Kenny Rogers 2007 Pitched one game on rehab assignment
- Cody Ross 2000
- Pedro Santana 1997, 1998
- Ramón Santiago 2000
- Jordan Tata 2004
- Clete Thomas 2005
- Andres Torres 1999
- Andy Van Hekken 2000
- Virgil Vasquez 2004
- Chris Wakeland 1997
- Jeff Weaver 1998
- Joel Zumaya 2003
- Nicholas Castellanos 2011
- Reese Olson 2021

== Broadcasting ==
The Whitecaps returned to "The Ticket West Michigan" for the 2024 season with radio simulcast on four stations: 106.1-FM and 1340-AM in Grand Rapids. For home games, they produce a Radio/TV Simulcast, while the road games are produced as a traditional radio broadcast. Dan Hasty is the Voice of the Whitecaps and has also filled in on Detroit Tigers Radio Play-by-Play, as well as hosting the Road to Detroit Podcast from 2019-2022, as well as serving as TV broadcast voice of Men's Basketball for the University of Detroit Mercy, the Grand Rapids Rise of Major League Volleyball and the Grand Rapids Gold of the NBA G-League.

== In popular culture ==
B-Roll footage of a game between the Whitecaps and South Bend Silver Hawks at Fifth Third Ballpark, was aired in Champ's Whammy! home runs scene in Anchorman 2: The Legend Continues. Officials with the West Michigan Whitecaps were unaware they would be featured in the movie and only found out after the movie was released in December 2013.

== See also ==
- Category:West Michigan Whitecaps players
