= Scott Tyler =

Scott Tyler may refer to:

- Scott Tyler (The Power of Five)
- Scott Tyler, character in Across the Continent
- Scott Tyler (American football), see Indianapolis Colts draft history
- Scott Tyler (baseball), see History of the Miami Marlins
- Scott Tyler, the character from Forza Horizon series
