= LMCU Ballpark =

Home venue of the West Michigan Whitecaps

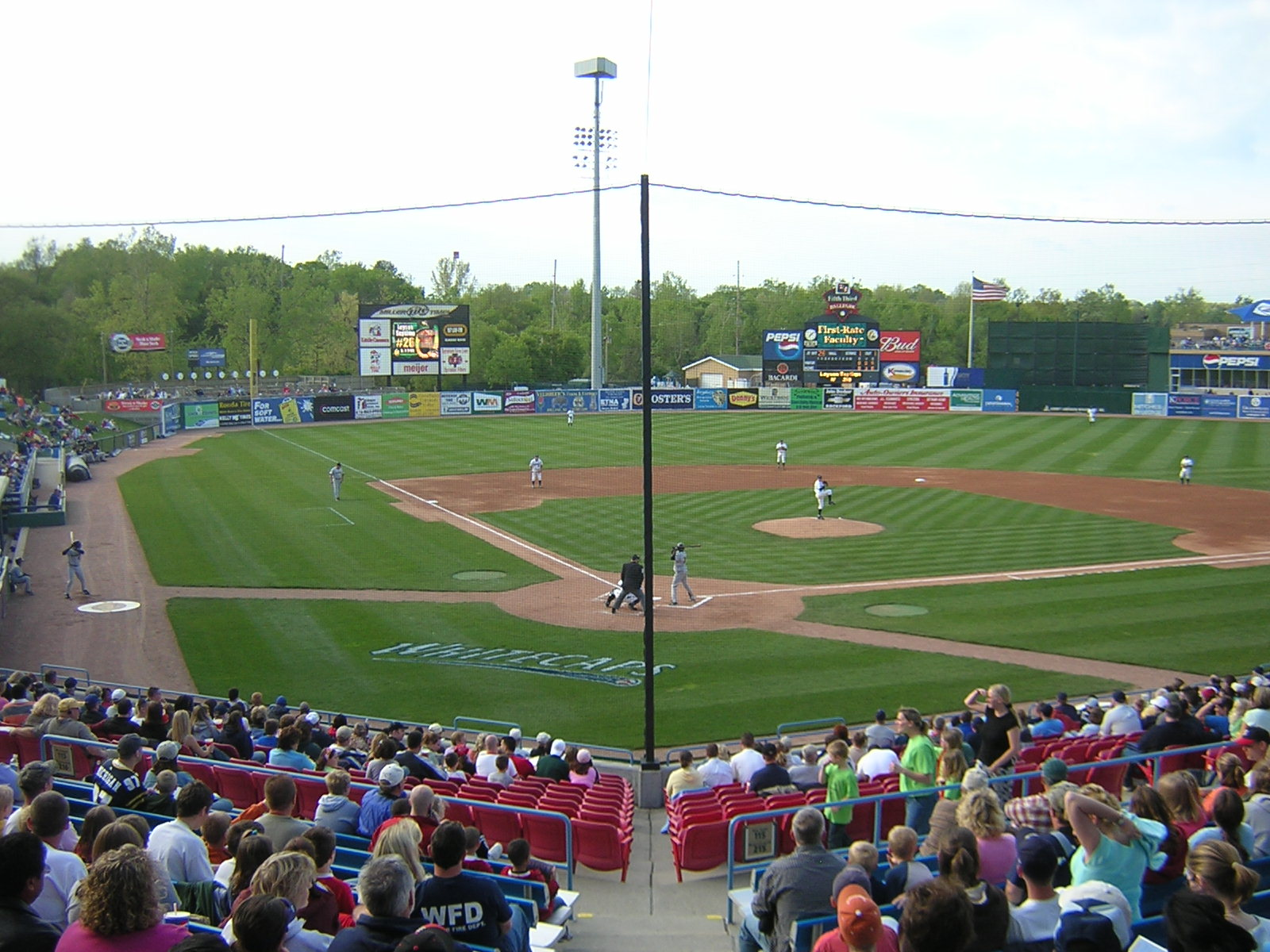

- Location within Michigan Location within the United States
- Former names: Old Kent Park (1994–2000); Fifth Third Ballpark (2000–2021)
- Location: 4500 West River Drive; Comstock Park, MI 49321
- Coordinates: 43.040195°N 85.659832°W
- Owner: West Michigan Whitecaps Corp.
- Operator: West Michigan Whitecaps Corp.
- Capacity: 10,923 (2018–present); 9,281 (2016–2017); 9,684 (2014–2015); 10,071 (2006–2013); 11,000 (1999–2006); 10,700 (1997–1998); 5,701 (1994–1996)
- Surface: Grass
- Field size: Left field: 317 ft (97 m); Center field: 402 ft (123 m); Right field: 327 ft (100 m)

Construction
- Groundbreaking: May 1993
- Opened: April 12, 1994
- Cost: $6.5 million ($14.1 million in 2025 dollars)
- Architect: Rossetti Architects
- Services engineer: Progressive AE
- General contractor: Wolverine Building Group

Tenant
- West Michigan Whitecaps (MWL) (1994–present)

LMCU Ballpark is a ballpark located in Comstock Park, Michigan, just north of Grand Rapids. Established as Old Kent Park in 1994, the stadium hosts a minor league baseball team, the West Michigan Whitecaps, and other sporting events. The ballpark's Fifth Third Burger was featured on an episode of Man v. Food. A fire damaged some of the first base side of the stadium on January 3, 2014, but the stadium re-opened in time to host the Whitecaps for the 2014 season.

== The stadium ==
LMCU Ballpark is home to the West Michigan Whitecaps, a professional minor league baseball team and Midwest League affiliate of the Detroit Tigers. LMCU Ballpark was originally built in 1994 as Old Kent Park. The name was changed when Fifth Third Bank purchased Old Kent Bank in 2000, then again in 2021 when a new naming rights partnership was signed with Lake Michigan Credit Union.

LMCU Ballpark opened with a seating capacity of 5,701 has been expanded in 1996 to seat 10,700, and 1999 to seat 11,000. It currently has a seating capacity of 8,942, including 7,642 fixed chairback seats. The stadium was built entirely with private funds. No taxpayer dollars were used in the construction.

In addition to baseball, LMCU Ballpark can also be used for other events including motorsports and concerts, where it seats up to 15,000. The ballpark hosts a large display of Christmas lights.

The ballpark is also notable for its Fifth Third Burger, a five-pound (2.3 kg), 4,800-calorie burger made with five 1/3-pound (0.15 kg) burger patties and topped with American cheese, nacho cheese sauce, chili, shredded lettuce, diced tomato, salsa, sour cream, and tortilla chips, all stuffed inside an eight-inch (20 cm) sesame seed bun. On the Season 2 "Baseball Special" episode of The Travel Channel's Man v. Food, host Adam Richman participated in a challenge in which he had to eat this burger in under the final 2 1/2 innings of the Whitecaps game (that is, after the 7th Inning Stretch). Adam won the challenge on behalf of "man", earning him a commemorative "Call 911" T-shirt and his photo posted on the Wall of Fame. As of the time of the July 2009 taping, 1,213 Fifth Third Burgers had been sold with Richman becoming just the 157th person to earn the T-shirt.

On September 29, 2007, Grand Valley State University defeated Wayne State University, 41–10, in the first-ever football game to be played at LMCU Ballpark. Grand Valley wore "Throwback" uniforms for the event.

On January 3, 2014, a fire broke out in one of the skyboxes, destroying much of the first base side of the structure and several skyboxes. The fire was caused by a space heater set next to a Rubbermaid trash can. Employees at the park at the time were able to escape without injury. The stadium reopened in time for Opening Day, and remodeling finished in time for the ballpark to host the 2014 Midwest League All-Star Game.

On October 8, 2016, LMCU Ballpark hosted an international friendly soccer game between Grand Rapids FC and Aurora United FC of Ontario.

== In popular culture ==
B-Roll footage of a game between the West Michigan Whitecaps and South Bend Silver Hawks at then Fifth Third Ballpark is featured in Champ's Whammy! home runs scene in Anchorman 2: The Legend Continues. Officials with the West Michigan Whitecaps were unaware they would be featured in the movie and only found out after it was released in December 2013.
