= Dallas Trahern =

- Pitcher
- Born: November 29, 1985 (age 40); Liberal, Kansas, U.S.
- Bats: Right Throws: Right
- Stats at Baseball Reference
Medals
Men's baseball
Representing the United States
Baseball World Cup
Gold medal – first place	2007 Tianmu	Team

Dallas Neal Trahern (born November 29, 1985) is an American former professional baseball pitcher. He played in international competition with USA Baseball.

Trahern was drafted by the Detroit Tigers in the 34th round of the 2004 Major League Baseball draft. He was traded along with Burke Badenhop, Eulogio De La Cruz, Cameron Maybin, Andrew Miller, and Mike Rabelo to the Florida Marlins in exchange for Miguel Cabrera and Dontrelle Willis.

He is known as a sinkerball pitcher and in 2009 had Tommy John surgery.
