= Burke Badenhop =

American baseball player (born 1983)

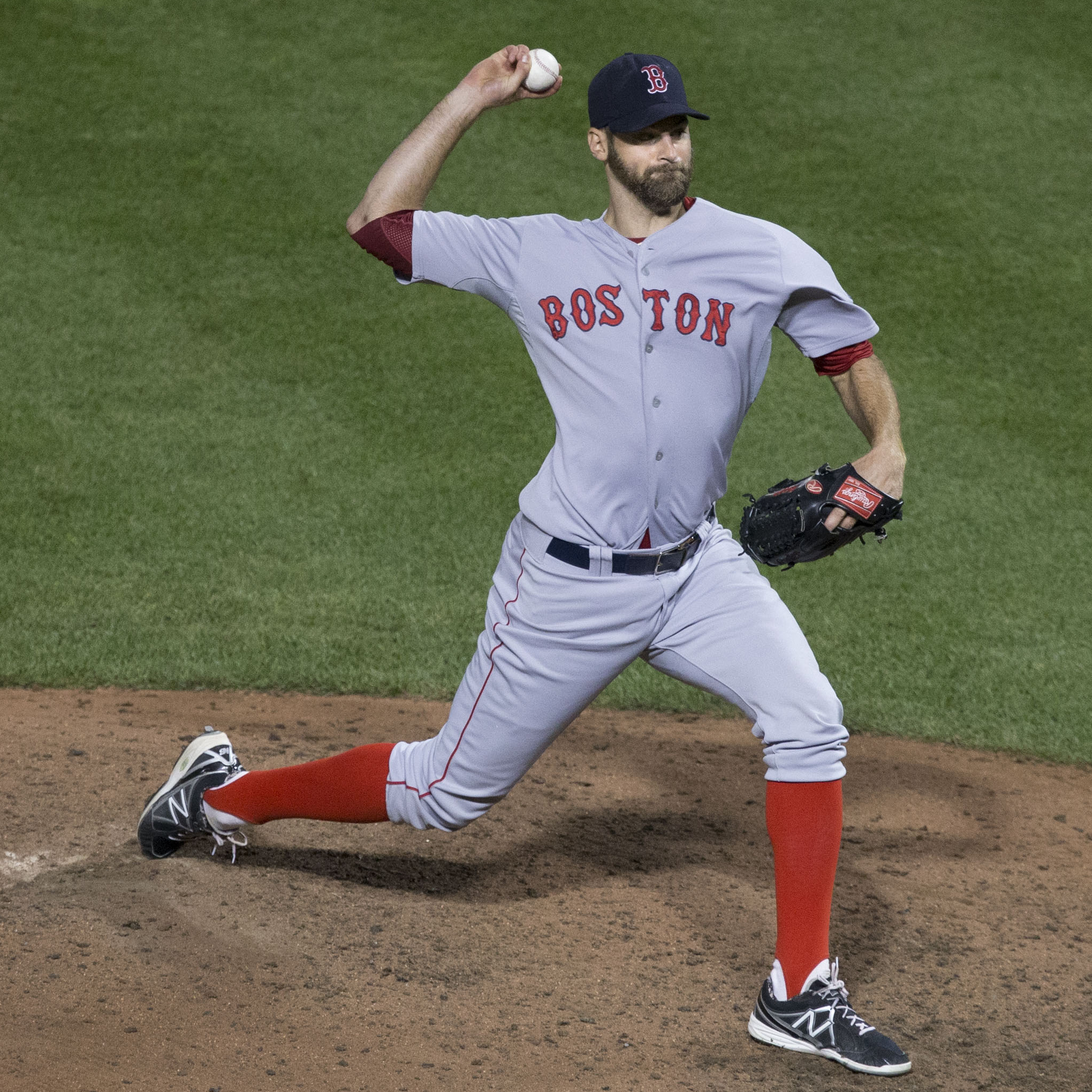
- Badenhop pitching for the Boston Red Sox in 2014
- Pitcher
- Born: February 8, 1983 (age 43); Atlanta, Georgia, U.S.
- Batted: Right Threw: Right

MLB debut
- April 9, 2008, for the Florida Marlins

Last MLB appearance
- October 3, 2015, for the Cincinnati Reds

MLB statistics
- Win–loss record: 20–27
- Earned run average: 3.74
- Strikeouts: 350
- Stats at Baseball Reference

Teams
- Florida Marlins (2008–2011); Tampa Bay Rays (2012); Milwaukee Brewers (2013); Boston Red Sox (2014); Cincinnati Reds (2015)

Burke Heinrich Badenhop (born February 8, 1983) is an American former professional baseball pitcher. He played in Major League Baseball (MLB) for the Florida Marlins, Tampa Bay Rays, Milwaukee Brewers, Boston Red Sox and Cincinnati Reds. Badenhop played college baseball at Bowling Green State University.

== Early ball ==
Badenhop played high school baseball at Perrysburg High School in Perrysburg, Ohio under coach Dave Hall. In college, he was a team member of the Bowling Green Falcons at Bowling Green State University.

== Baseball career ==
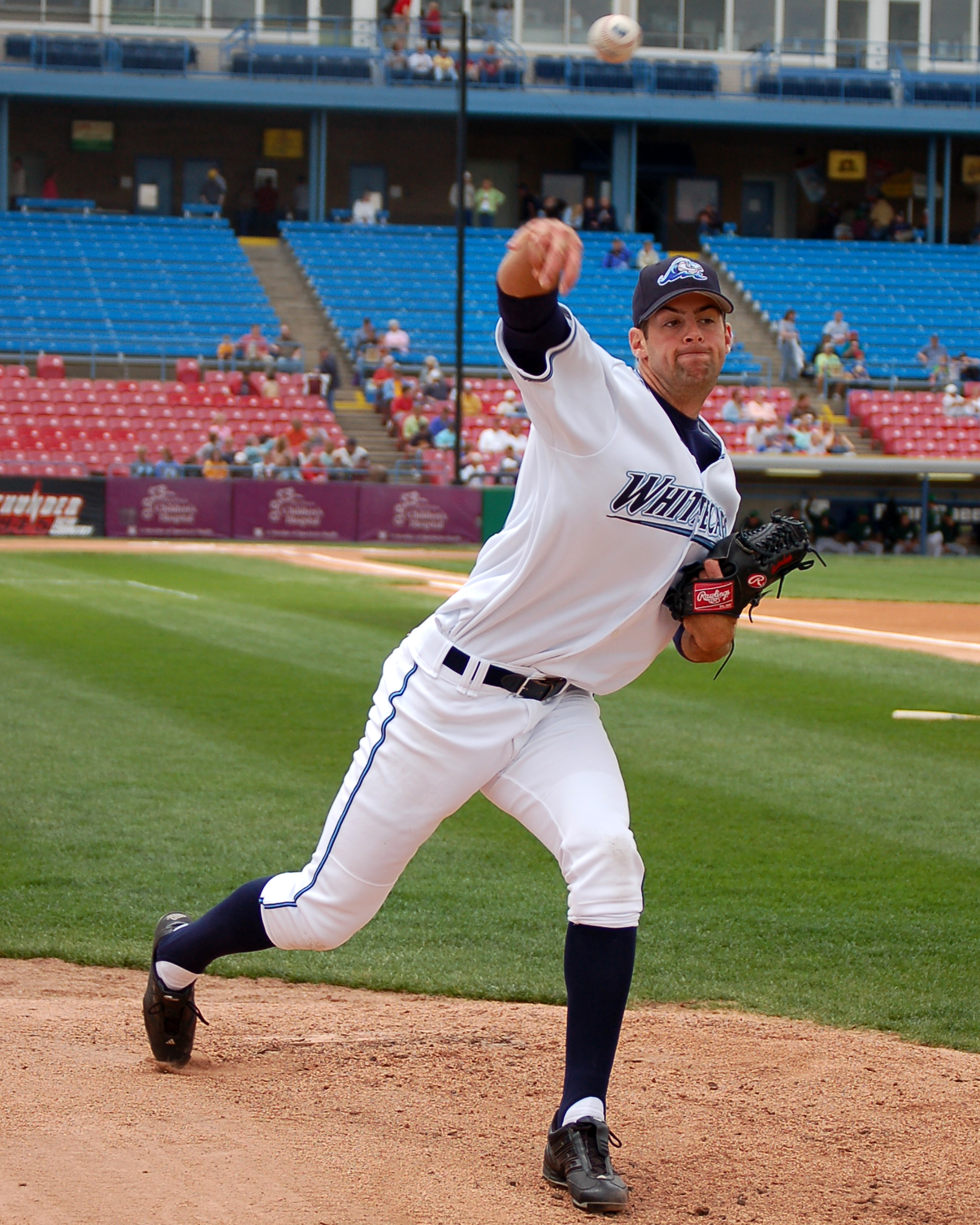
Badenhop during his tenure with the West Michigan Whitecaps, single-A affiliates of the Detroit Tigers, in 2006

=== Detroit Tigers ===
Badenhop was originally drafted by the Detroit Tigers.

=== Florida/Miami Marlins ===
On December 5, 2007, he was traded to the Florida Marlins (along with Cameron Maybin; Andrew Miller; Eulogio De La Cruz; Mike Rabelo and minor league player, Dallas Trahern) for Miguel Cabrera and Dontrelle Willis. On April 9, 2008, Badenhop made his major league debut against the Washington Nationals. He had a 1-2-3 inning, which included striking out Rob Mackowiak. Badenhop made his first major league pitching start on April 13, 2008, against the Houston Astros.

Badenhop is known by teammates as "The Hopper", a nickname given to him by Marlins manager Fredi González.

On May 16, 2011, Badenhop was a part of one of the more bizarre games in the team's history against the New York Mets, which ended following Badenhop's game-winning RBI single—just his second career hit. It was the first time that a relief pitcher had given his team the game-winning hit since Micah Owings did it in a 2008 game playing for the Cincinnati Reds.

=== Tampa Bay Rays ===
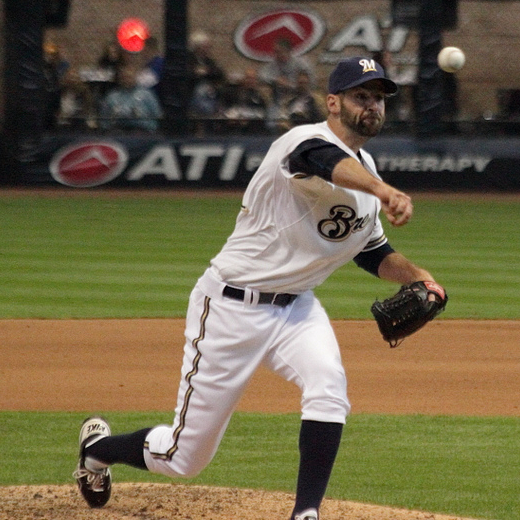
Badenhop with the Milwaukee Brewers

On December 12, 2011, he was traded to the Tampa Bay Rays for Jake Jefferies. Badenhop was used during the 2012 season as a long-relief pitcher and as a ground-ball specialist because of his sinker.

=== Milwaukee Brewers ===
On December 1, 2012, Badenhop was traded to the Milwaukee Brewers for Raúl Mondesí Jr. On January 18, 2013, the Brewers announced they had avoided arbitration with Badenhop, signing him to a one-year contract worth $1.55 million.

=== Boston Red Sox ===
On November 22, 2013, Badenhop was traded to the Boston Red Sox for LHP prospect Luis Ortega. Badenhop had a solid season for the Red Sox despite not winning any games. In 70 innings, Badenhop put up a 2.29 ERA and allowing only 1 home run. He recorded one save in a 14 inning game against the White Sox on April 16, 2014.

=== Cincinnati Reds ===
On February 7, 2015, Badenhop signed a one-year, $1 million contract with the Cincinnati Reds that included a $4 million option for a second year with a $1.5 million buyout.

=== Texas Rangers ===
On April 6, 2016, Badenhop signed a minor league deal with the Texas Rangers. He was released on April 19, 2016.

== Author ==
Badenhop is co-author of the book "Financial Planning For Your First Job", published by Coventry House Publishing, where he draws from his business background at Bowling Green State University.
