= Cameron Maybin =

American baseball player (born 1987)

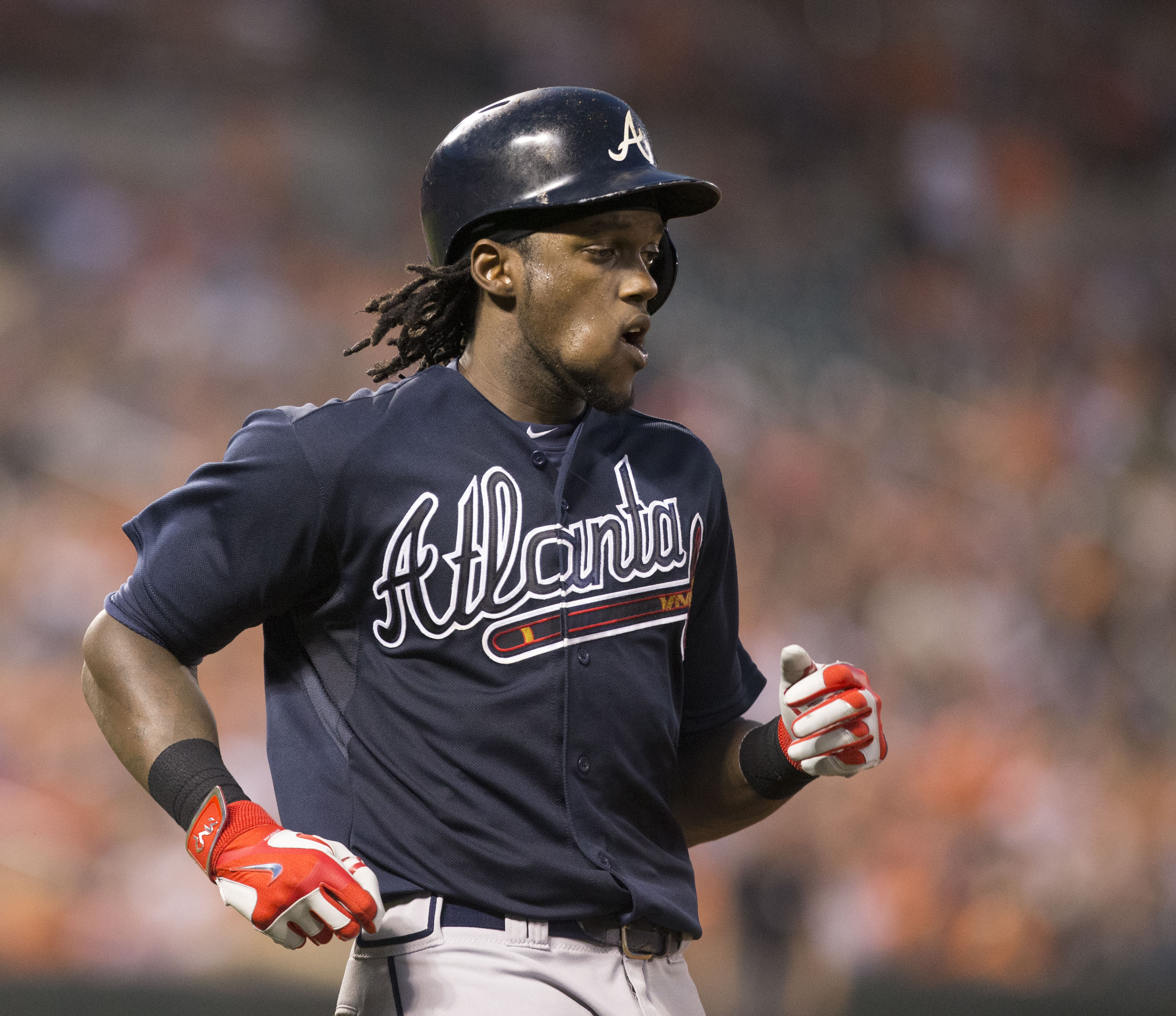
- Maybin with the Braves in 2015
- Center fielder
- Born: April 4, 1987 (age 39); Asheville, North Carolina, U.S.
- Batted: Right Threw: Right

MLB debut
- August 17, 2007, for the Detroit Tigers

Last MLB appearance
- May 29, 2021, for the New York Mets

MLB statistics
- Batting average: .254
- Home runs: 72
- Runs batted in: 354
- Stats at Baseball Reference

Teams
- Detroit Tigers (2007); Florida Marlins (2008–2010); San Diego Padres (2011–2014); Atlanta Braves (2015); Detroit Tigers (2016); Los Angeles Angels (2017); Houston Astros (2017); Miami Marlins (2018); Seattle Mariners (2018); New York Yankees (2019); Detroit Tigers (2020); Chicago Cubs (2020); New York Mets (2021)

Career highlights and awards
- World Series champion (2017)

Cameron Keith Maybin (born April 4, 1987) is an American professional baseball broadcaster and former center fielder. He played in Major League Baseball (MLB) for the Detroit Tigers, Florida / Miami Marlins, San Diego Padres, Atlanta Braves, Los Angeles Angels, Houston Astros, Seattle Mariners, New York Yankees, Chicago Cubs, and New York Mets. He was the tenth overall pick in the 2005 MLB draft by the Tigers and debuted with them in 2007. With the Astros, he won the 2017 World Series.

== Early life ==
Maybin played high school baseball for T. C. Roberson High School in Asheville, North Carolina. As a freshman, he led his team to the 2002 North Carolina 3A state title and was named MVP of the state championship series. Joe Hayden, his manager with the Midland Redskins, said he had "the same instincts in the outfield and at the plate" as Ken Griffey Jr., who Hayden also coached in the Connie Mack Division, an amateur baseball league for players 18 and younger. The summer before his senior season, Maybin won the Connie Mack batting title and the 2004 Connie Mack World Series MVP award. Maybin was also named the 2004 Baseball America Youth Player of the Year.

== Professional career ==
=== Draft and minor leagues ===
Prior to the 2005 MLB draft, Baseball America tabbed Maybin as the most promising available outfielder and the third-best hitting prospect overall. He fell to the Tigers in tenth spot in the 2005 draft in part due to speculation he would be difficult to sign. He signed in September for a $2.65 million bonus.

In 2006, Maybin played his first professional season for the Class-A West Michigan Whitecaps, helping them win the Midwest League championship. He had a batting average of .304, hit nine home runs and stole 27 bases. He was chosen to participate in the All-Star Futures Game.

In late November 2006, Cameron was given the Class A Playoff Performer Award by MiLB.com. He began the 2007 season with the Lakeland Flying Tigers of the High-A Florida State League. On August 9, 2007, Maybin was promoted from the Single-A Lakeland Flying Tigers to the Double-A Erie SeaWolves where he played six games before his call up to the Major League.

Maybin was consistently ranked as the Tigers top minor league prospect while in the organization.

Maybin also played in the minors in 2008 for the Marlins Double-A affiliate Carolina Mudcats where he hit .277 with 13 home runs, 49 RBIs and 21 stolen bases to go along with a hefty 124 strikeouts in 390 at-bats (108 games).

==== Minor league honors ====
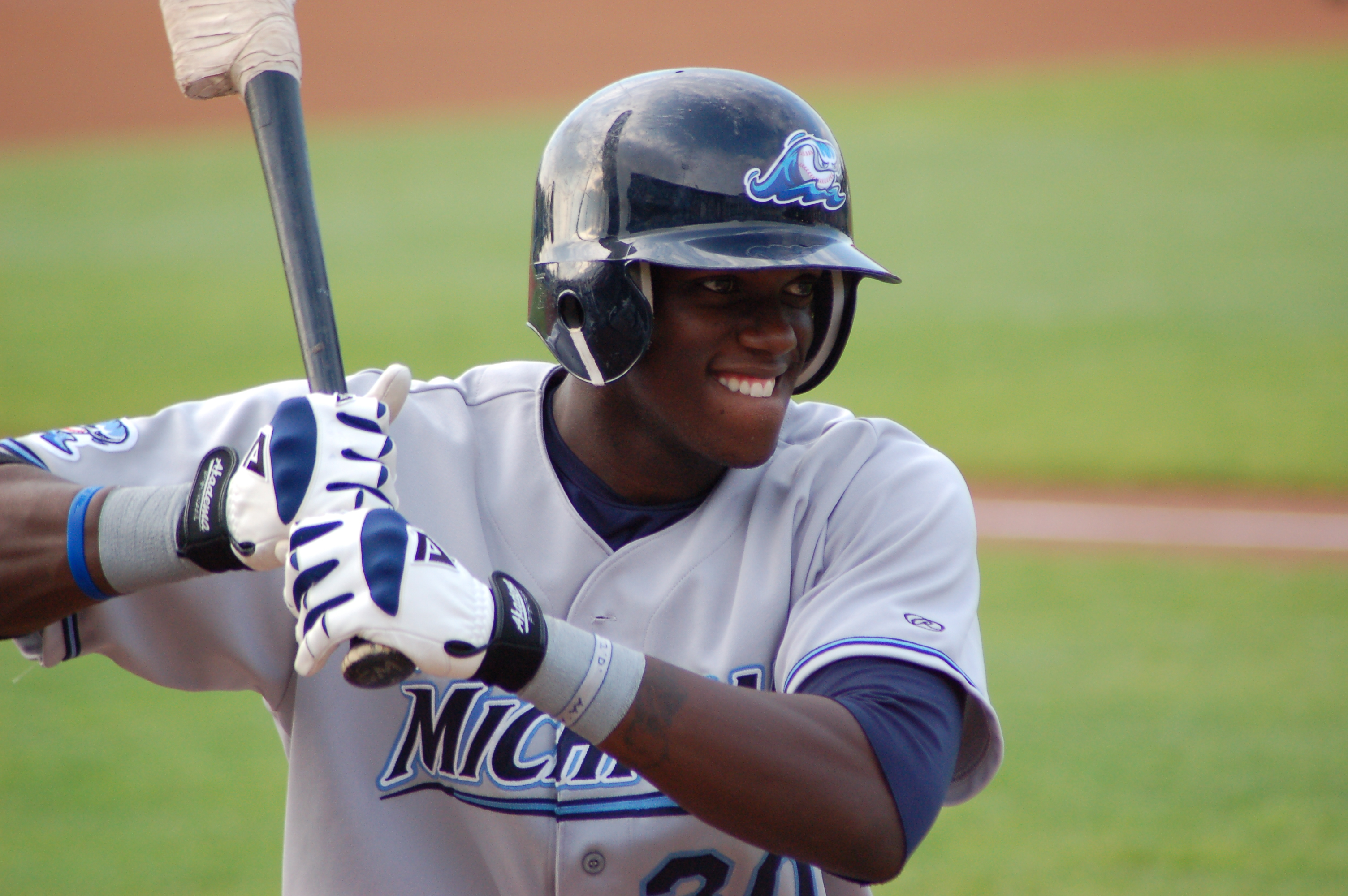
Maybin with the West Michigan Whitecaps in 2006.

- 2× All-Star Futures Game selection
- Southern League Player of the Week
- Arizona Fall League Rising Stars
- Southern League Mid-Season All-Star
- Baseball America High Class A All-Star
- Florida State League Postseason All-Star
- Florida State League Mid-Season All-Star
- MiLB.com Class A Best Playoff Performer
- Baseball America Low Class A All-Star
- Midwest League Postseason All-Star
- Midwest League Prospect of the Year

=== Detroit Tigers ===
Maybin was called up to the Tigers on August 17, 2007 and made his Major League debut that day, going 0-for-4. He was the youngest player in the American League (20 years old). In his second game, August 18, 2007, Maybin picked up his first career hit, (a single), and first career home run, both off of Roger Clemens. During his next plate appearance, he was hit by a Clemens fastball. Thus, Maybin received his first MLB hit, home run, and hit-by-pitch in the same game. Maybin became the first player to hit a home run off a pitcher who won a Cy Young Award before he was born.

=== Florida Marlins ===
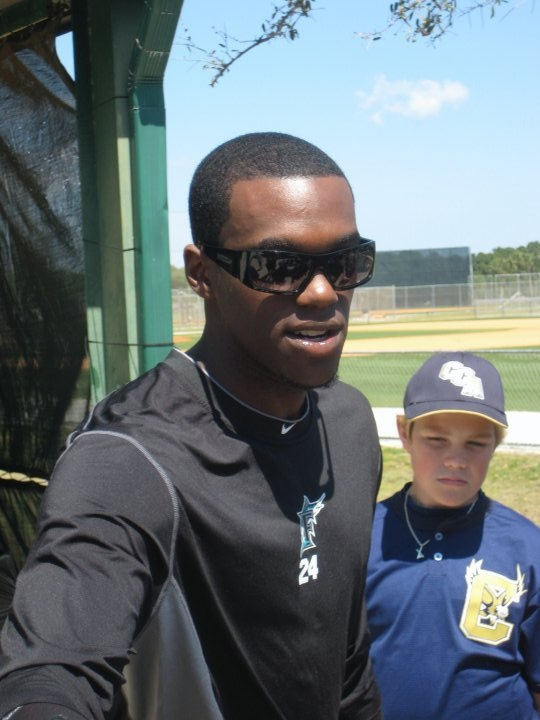
Maybin with the Florida Marlins in 2010 spring training

On December 5, 2007, the Tigers traded Maybin, Andrew Miller, Mike Rabelo, Dallas Trahern, Eulogio De La Cruz, and Burke Badenhop to the Florida Marlins for Dontrelle Willis and Miguel Cabrera.

The Marlins called up Maybin on September 16, 2008. He went 16 for 32 (.500 average) with 4 stolen bases in 8 Major League games. On September 28, playing in center field, he caught the final out in the final game played at Shea Stadium, a fly ball from New York Mets right fielder Ryan Church. In 2009, Maybin was the starting center fielder for Florida when they faced the Washington Nationals on Opening Day. Maybin was sent down to the AAA New Orleans Zephyrs on May 10 after a poor start to the 2009 season, hitting .202 in 22 starts. Maybin was called back up to the Marlins on August 31 after hitting .319 in Triple-A and finished out the season with the big league club.

Maybin began the 2010 season as the Marlins starting center fielder, but was sent to Triple-A New Orleans on June 17 after hitting .225 with the club. He hit .340 in the minors and rejoined the Marlins on August 24. In his final season with the Marlins, Maybin finished the year hitting .234 with 9 stolen bases over 82 games.

=== San Diego Padres ===
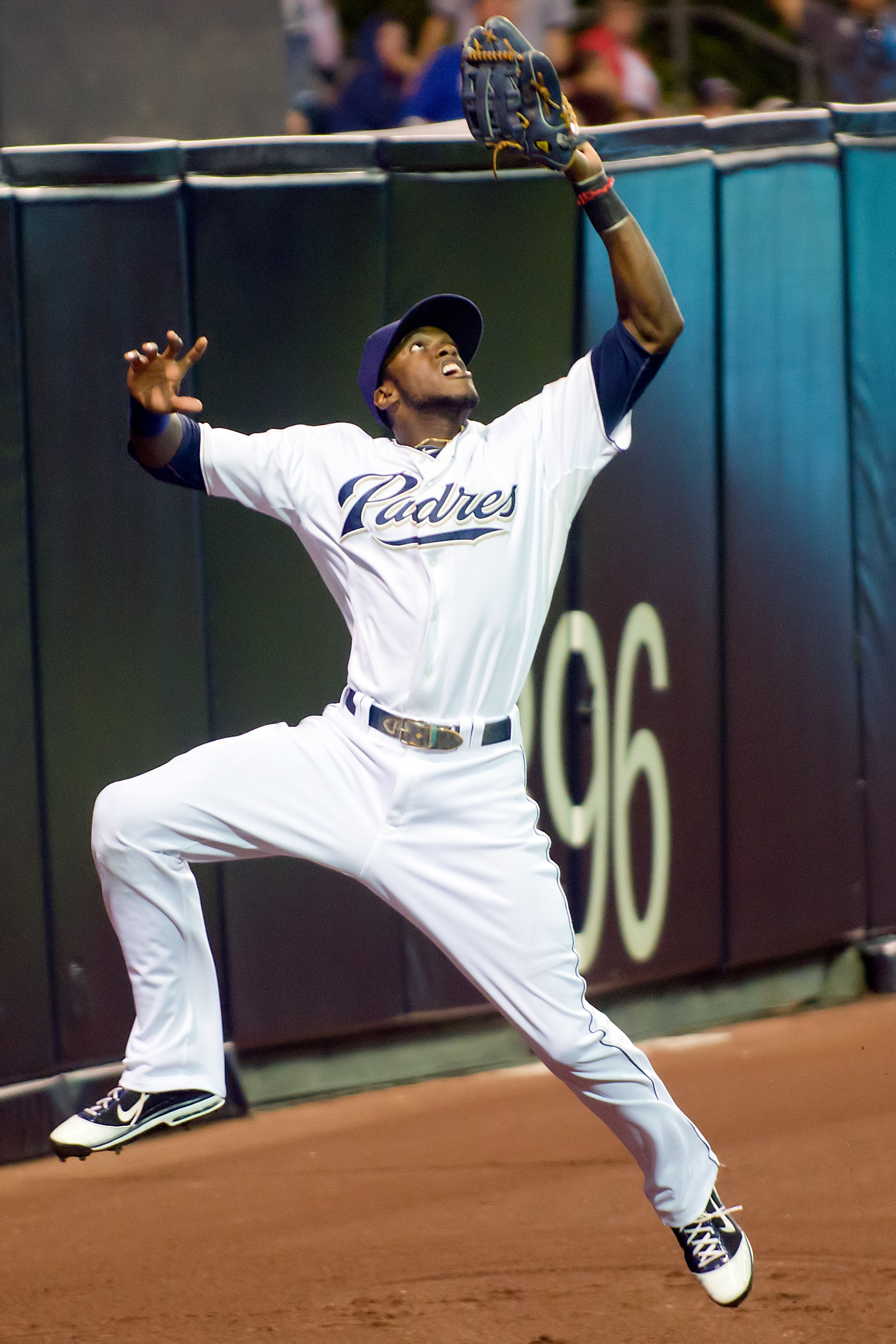
Maybin playing for the San Diego Padres in 2011

Following the 2010 season, Maybin was traded to the Padres for Ryan Webb and Edward Mujica. In 2011, he became the ninth player in Padres history to steal 40 bases. He hit .264 with nine home runs and 40 RBIs and was the Padres' 2011 nominee for the Hank Aaron Award. The San Diego Union-Tribune praised Maybin's defense and called his acquisition "one of the best trades in Padres history" and named him the team's MVP. MLB.com wrote that his defense in center field was "Gold Glove-caliber".

On March 3, 2012, Maybin and the Padres agreed on a five-year contract worth $25 million with a club option for a sixth year.

Maybin began the 2012 season in a prolonged slump, hitting .212 in the first half of the season, but he rebounded in the second half, batting .283, and finished the year with a .243/.306/.349 batting line and 26 stolen bases. He removed a high leg kick from his swing in July and credited the adjustment with his improved results. Maybin was also hampered during the season by a lingering sore wrist that caused him to miss a handful of starts in late May and in July and a sore Achilles' tendon that cost him time in September. Maybin made 136 starts in center field on the year.

Maybin missed most of the 2013 season to injuries. He started 10 games in center field before going on the disabled list in mid-April with inflammation and an impingement in his right wrist. He returned for 4 games in early June before he tore a posterior cruciate ligament in his right knee diving for a ball. While rehabbing the knee, Maybin decided to have surgery on the wrist in September as it continued to trouble him. The surgery found loose particles and loose cartilage and a recovery time of 8–12 weeks was expected.

On July 23, 2014, Maybin was suspended 25 games for using amphetamines, a violation of the Major League Baseball drug policy. He said the failed test was the result of treatment for attention deficit disorder (ADD), but added: "I understand that I must accept responsibility for this mistake". Maybin was activated from the restricted list on August 20, 2014.

=== Atlanta Braves ===
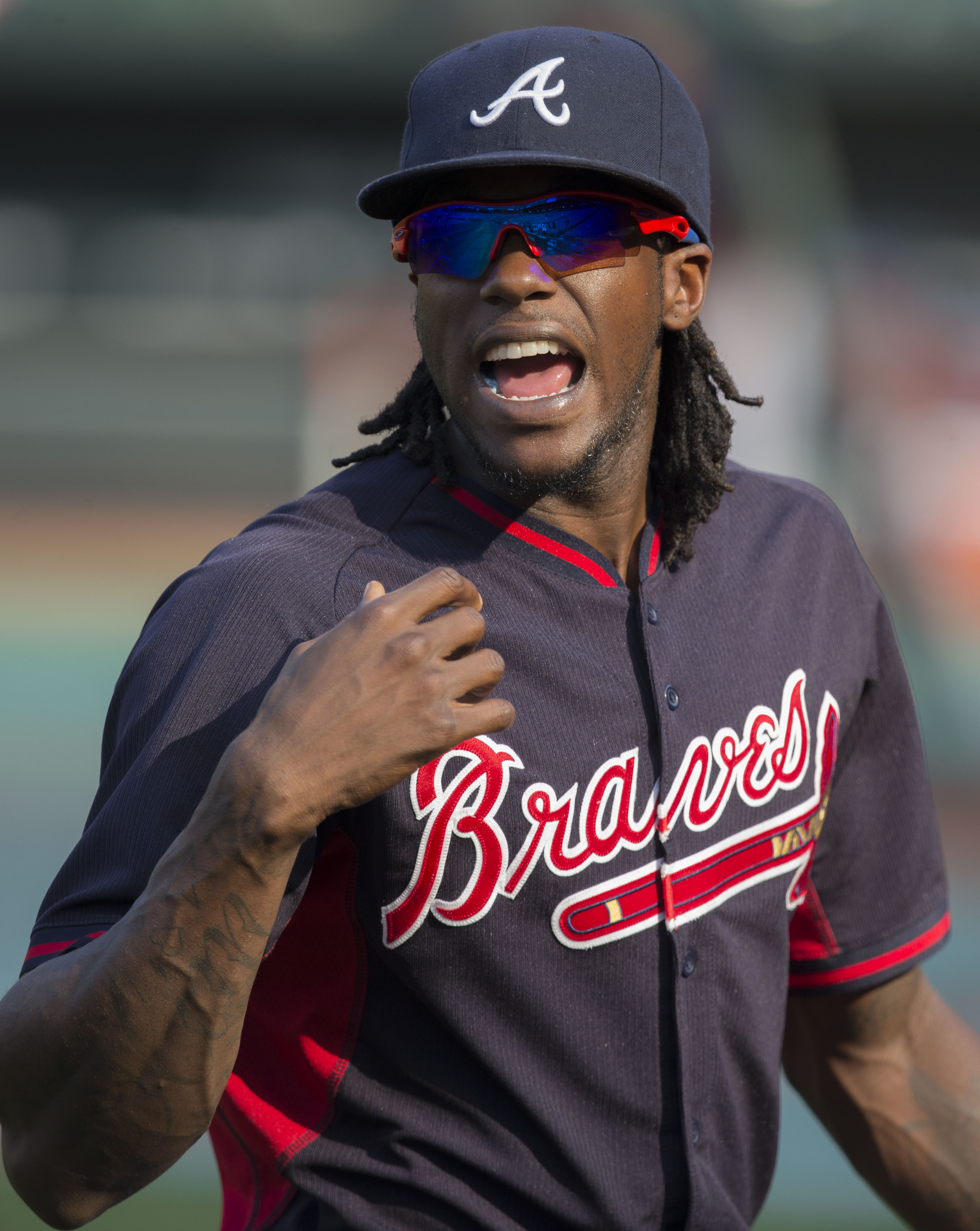
Maybin with the Atlanta Braves in 2015

On April 5, 2015, Maybin was traded along with LF Carlos Quentin, LF Jordan Paroubeck, RHP Matt Wisler, and a draft pick to the Atlanta Braves for RHP Craig Kimbrel and outfielder Melvin Upton Jr. During the 2015 season, Maybin hit .267/.327/.370 with 65 runs scored, 18 doubles, two triples, 10 home runs, and 59 RBIs in 141 games. He finished 10th in the National League with 23 stolen bases. He was sixth in the league with a .356 batting average with runners in scoring position.

=== Detroit Tigers (second stint) ===
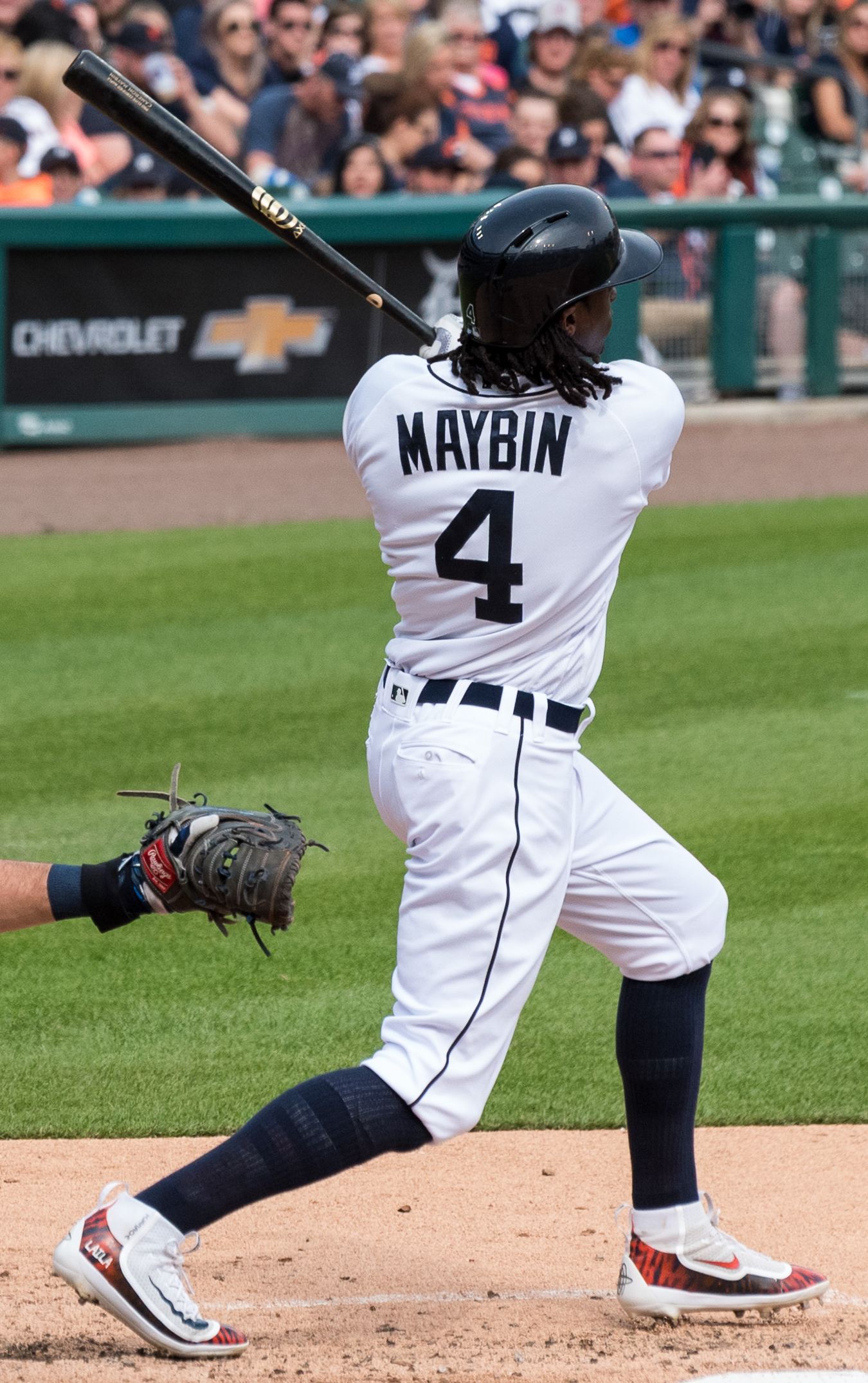
Maybin batting for the Tigers

On November 20, 2015, the Braves traded Maybin to the Tigers for Ian Krol and Gabe Speier. On March 3, 2016, the Tigers announced that Maybin suffered a non-displaced fracture in his wrist that would sideline him for at least 4–6 weeks. The fracture occurred when Maybin was hit by a 95-mph fastball from New York Yankees pitcher Luis Severino in a spring training game. On May 16, 2016, Maybin was recalled by the Tigers following his rehab assignment with the Toledo Mud Hens. Maybin was named the American League Co-Player of the Week, along with fellow Tigers teammate Miguel Cabrera, for whom he had been traded 8 years ago, for the week of May 16–22. Maybin hit .600/.652/.750 with one home run, five RBIs and four stolen bases in his first six games in his second stint with the Tigers.

On June 30, 2016, Maybin was a key player in the Tigers' dramatic eight-run ninth inning against the Tampa Bay Rays. With the Tigers trailing 7–2 entering the top of the ninth, Maybin led off the inning with a single, and later finished the rally with a three-run double, helping the Tigers to a 10–7 win.

Maybin was placed on the 15-day disabled list August 4, 2016, having sprained his thumb diving for a ball in a game on August 3, 2016. He was activated on August 21, 2016, and started in center field against the Boston Red Sox.

Maybin hit .315 for the 2016 Tigers, with 4 home runs, 5 triples and a team-leading 15 stolen bases, but injuries limited him to just 92 games.

=== Los Angeles Angels ===
After the 2016 season, the Tigers traded Maybin to the Los Angeles Angels for Victor Alcántara. The Angels subsequently exercised the $9 million option on Maybin's contract for the 2017 season. On July 18, 2017, Maybin was placed on the disabled list with a MCL sprain in his right knee. Maybin batted .235, hit 6 home runs, stole 29 bases, and drove in 22 RBIs in 93 games with the Angels before being claimed off waivers by the Astros on August 31, 2017.

=== Houston Astros ===
On August 31, 2017, the Houston Astros acquired Maybin from the Angels off waivers. In Game 2 of the 2017 World Series, Maybin came in as a pinch hitter; he singled and stole second in the 11th inning before scoring off a George Springer home run. Houston would go on to win that game 7–6 in the 11th. Houston would go on to win the series in 7, giving Maybin his first Championship. In 2017 for the Astros, he batted .186/.226/.441 in 59 at bats.

=== Miami Marlins (second stint) ===
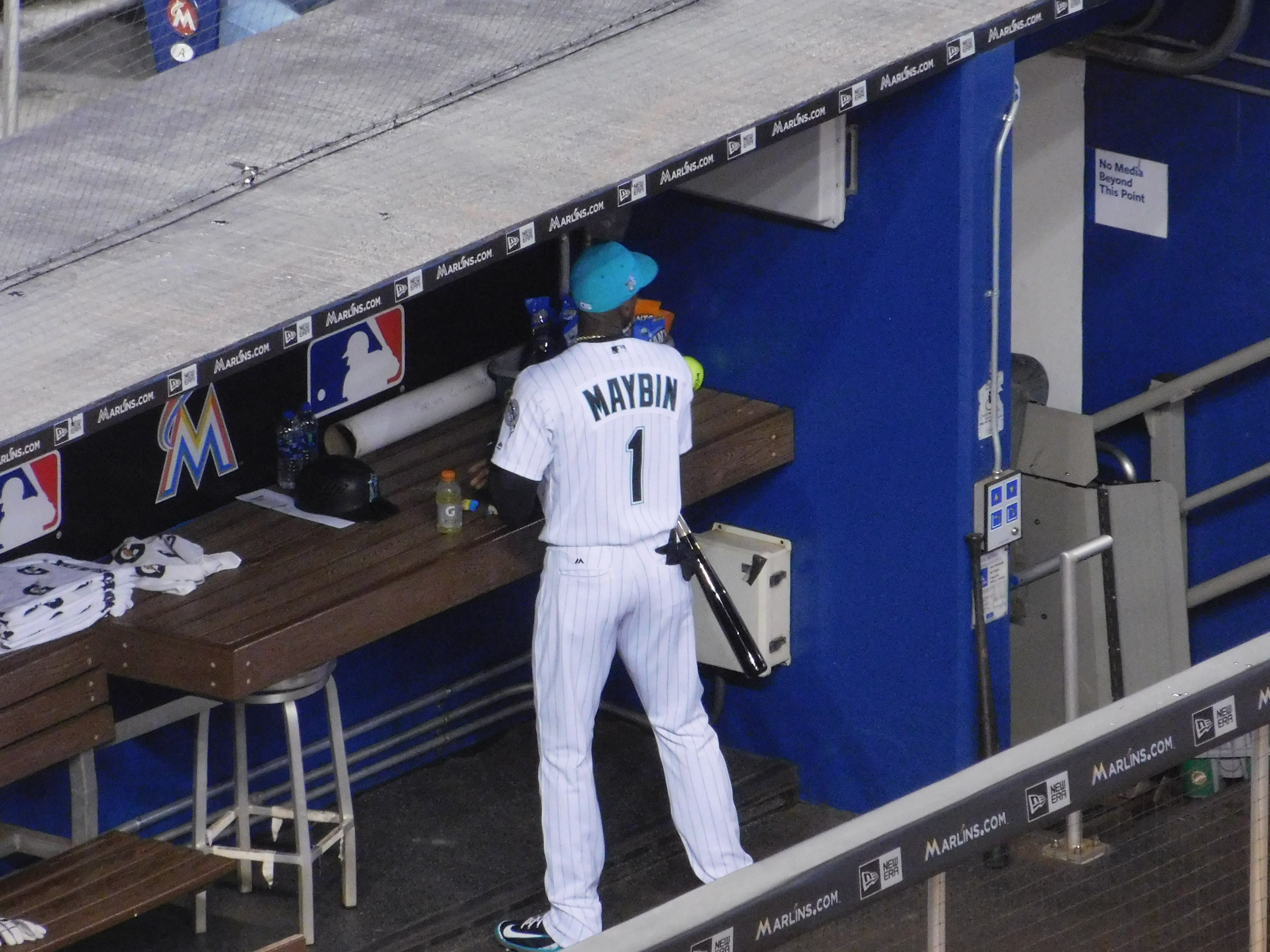
Maybin as a member of the Marlins in June 2018

On February 21, 2018, Maybin signed a one-year contract worth $3.5 million (plus incentives) to return to the Marlins. With the Marlins in 2018, he batted .251/.338/.343 in 251 at bats.

=== Seattle Mariners ===
On July 31, 2018, Maybin was traded to the Seattle Mariners for shortstop Bryson Brigman and $250,000 in international bonus pool slot money. With the Mariners in 2018, he batted .242/.289/.319 in 97 plate appearances. He elected free agency on October 29.

=== San Francisco Giants ===
Maybin signed a minor league contract with a non-roster invitation to spring training with the San Francisco Giants on February 21, 2019. Maybin was arrested for DUI on March 1, 2019 and was released by the Giants on March 22, 2019.

=== Cleveland Indians ===
On March 29, 2019, Maybin signed a minor league deal with the Cleveland Indians. He began the 2019 season with the Columbus Clippers.

=== New York Yankees ===
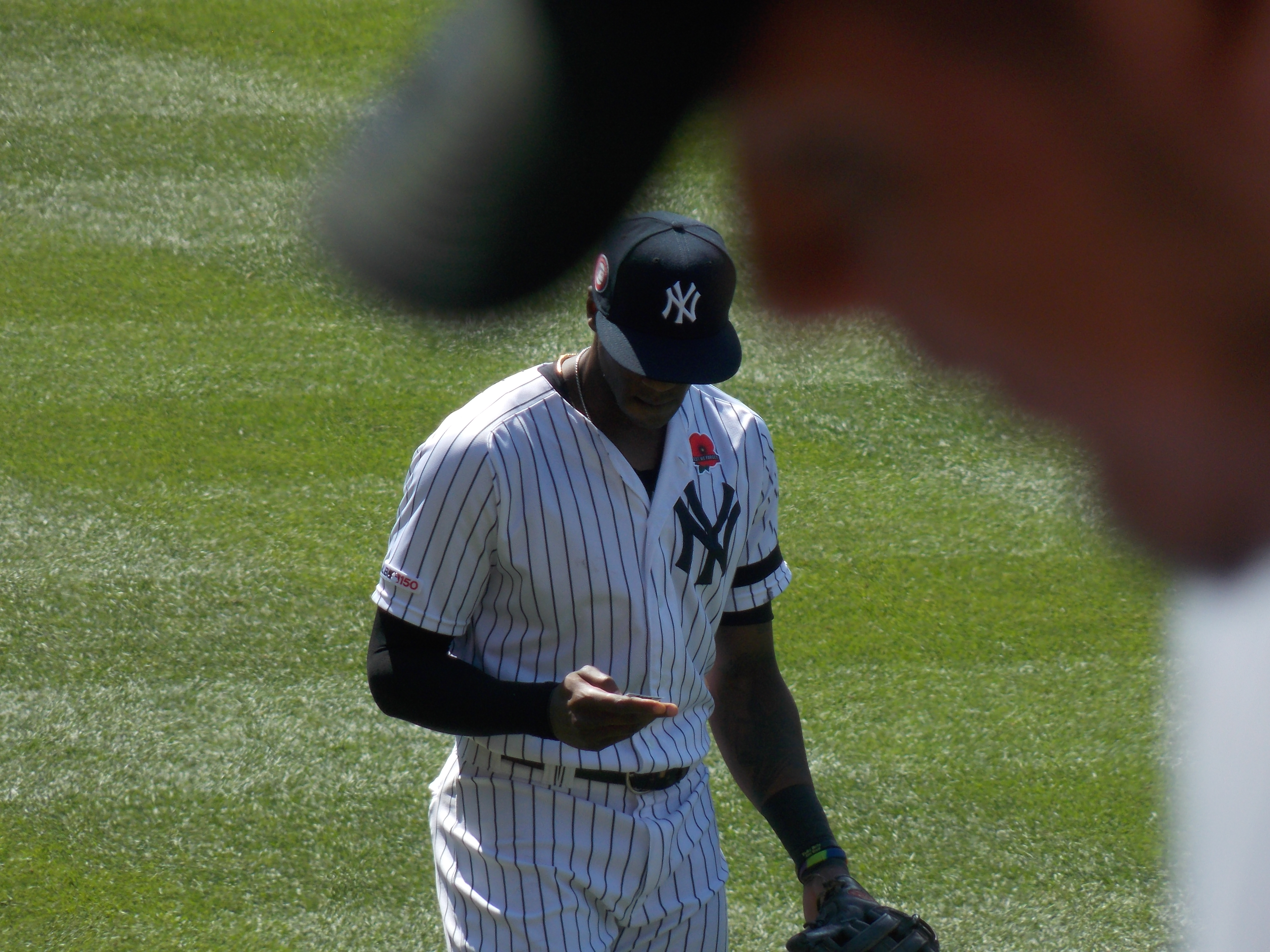
Maybin with the Yankees in 2019

On April 25, 2019, the Indians traded Maybin to the New York Yankees for cash considerations. Maybin made his debut with the Yankees the next day, April 26. He went 1–4 in the game with an RBI. Maybin homered in four consecutive games in June. Yankees radio announcer, John Sterling gave the call of "Hammerin' Cameron!" after each Maybin home run, similar to the unique calls he gave to many Yankee players. During his time with the Yankees, Maybin's consistent high-level play and enthusiastic personality made him a quick fan favorite.

=== Detroit Tigers (third stint) ===
On February 12, 2020, the Tigers signed Maybin to a one-year $1.5 million contract for his third stint with the team and traded him a third time.

=== Chicago Cubs ===
On August 31, 2020, the Tigers traded Maybin to the Chicago Cubs for infielder Zack Short. In 32 games split between the Tigers and Cubs, Maybin hit .247/.307/.387 with one home run and 7 RBI in 93 at-bats. On February 19, 2021, Maybin re-signed with the Cubs on a minor league contract that included an invitation to Spring Training.

On March 27, 2021, Maybin was granted his release by the Cubs, making him a free agent, but re-signed with the Cubs on a new minor league contract the next day.

=== New York Mets ===
On May 18, 2021, Maybin was traded to the New York Mets for cash considerations. The cash payment for the trade by the Mets was one dollar. On May 19, Maybin was selected to the active roster. Maybin was designated for assignment on May 31 after going 1-for-28 in 9 games. He was outrighted to the Triple-A Syracuse Mets on June 3. On October 4, Maybin elected free agency.

Maybin announced his retirement on January 3, 2022, in a tweet.

== Broadcasting career ==
Maybin joined the YES Network as a color commentator for Yankees broadcasts for the 2022 season. In April 2022, he joined MLB Network as an on-air contributor for shows such as MLB Tonight. Maybin joined the Tigers broadcast team on Bally Sports Detroit as a studio analyst and occasional in-game analyst for the 2023 season. Maybin was also an analyst for the Detroit Tigers Radio Network for about 40 road contests. His contract was not renewed after the 2023 season due to allegations of sexual harassment, including making lewd comments and sending inappropriate text messages to female staff members.

== Personal life ==
Maybin is a cousin of former NFL linebacker Aaron Maybin, linebacker Jalen Reeves-Maybin (Reeves-Maybin's father is Marques Maybin, a former University of Louisville basketball guard), former NBA guard Rashad McCants, and former WNBA guard/forward Rashanda McCants. He is a third cousin of former NFL and Canadian Football League running back John Avery.

Maybin and his wife Courtney's first child was born in 2016. They have three children, Trent, Max, and Laila. The family ran a non-profit called Maybin Mission that supported children in his hometown of Asheville.

== See also ==
- List of Major League Baseball players suspended for performance-enhancing drugs

Preceded by Carlos Gonzales	Midwest League Prospect of the Year; 2006	Succeeded by Clayton Kershaw
