= Mike Rabelo =

American baseball player & manager (born 1980)

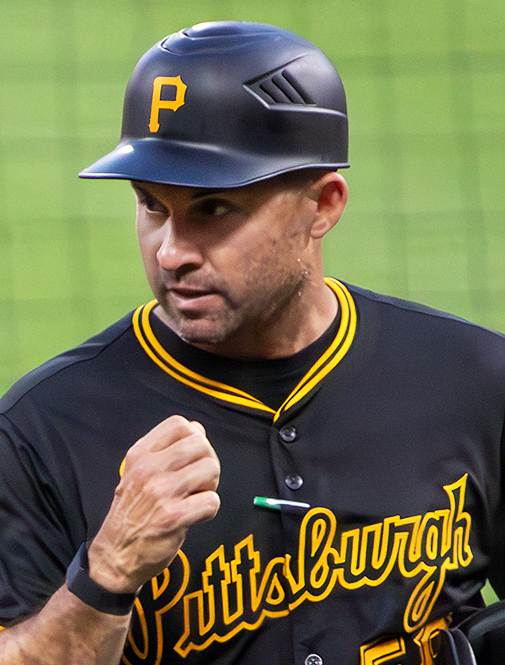
- Rabelo coaching 3rd for the Pirates in 2024

Minnesota Twins – No. 63
- Catcher / Coach
- Born: January 17, 1980 (age 46); New Port Richey, Florida, U.S.
- Batted: Switch Threw: Right

MLB debut
- September 23, 2006, for the Detroit Tigers

Last MLB appearance
- June 22, 2008, for the Florida Marlins

MLB statistics
- Batting average: .234
- Home runs: 4
- Runs batted in: 28
- Stats at Baseball Reference

Teams
- As player: Detroit Tigers (2006–2007); Florida Marlins (2008); As coach: Pittsburgh Pirates (2020–2025); Minnesota Twins (2026–present)

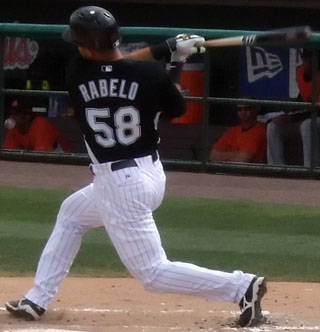
Rabelo with the Florida Marlins

Michael Gregory Rabelo (born January 17, 1980) is an American former professional baseball catcher and current assistant bench coach for the Minnesota Twins of Major League Baseball (MLB). He played in MLB for the Detroit Tigers and Florida Marlins from 2006 to 2008.

== Amateur career ==
A native of New Port Richey, Florida, Rabelo attended Ridgewood High School . Following his senior year in 1998, Rabelo was drafted in the 13th round of the Major League Baseball amateur draft by the Boston Red Sox. He did not however sign, he instead chose to play collegiate baseball for the University of Tampa Spartans. In 2000, he played collegiate summer baseball with the Hyannis Mets of the Cape Cod Baseball League. Following his junior year of college, the Detroit Tigers signed Rabelo after selecting him in the 4th round of the 2001 MLB draft.

== Professional career ==
=== Detroit Tigers ===
Rabelo began his career with the Single-A Oneonta Tigers of the New York–Penn League, where he was named an all star at catcher. He later played for the Single-A West Michigan Whitecaps in 2002 and 2003; the Single-A Lakeland Flying Tigers in 2004; the Double-A Erie SeaWolves in 2004, 2005, and 2006; and the Triple-A Toledo Mud Hens to finish out the 2006 season. During his time in the minors, Rabelo developed a reputation as a personal catcher for pitcher Joel Zumaya. Rabelo was added to the Tigers 40-man roster in September 2006, and made his debut the same month.

Rabelo began the 2007 season third on the Tigers catching depth chart behind established veterans Iván Rodríguez and backup Vance Wilson. During spring training, Wilson experienced elbow pain, and later learned he would have to undergo Tommy John surgery. As a result, Rabelo began the season on the 25-man active roster, and generally played well, maintaining a batting average that surpassed his minor league average of .263. He hit his first major league home run on September 30, 2007, the last game of the season off Mike MacDougal of the Chicago White Sox.

=== Florida Marlins ===
On December 5, 2007, the Tigers traded Rabelo, Andrew Miller, Cameron Maybin, Dallas Trahern, Eulogio De La Cruz and Burke Badenhop to the Florida Marlins for Dontrelle Willis and Miguel Cabrera. In November 2009, Rabelo was granted free agency by the Florida Marlins.

=== Second Stint with Tigers ===
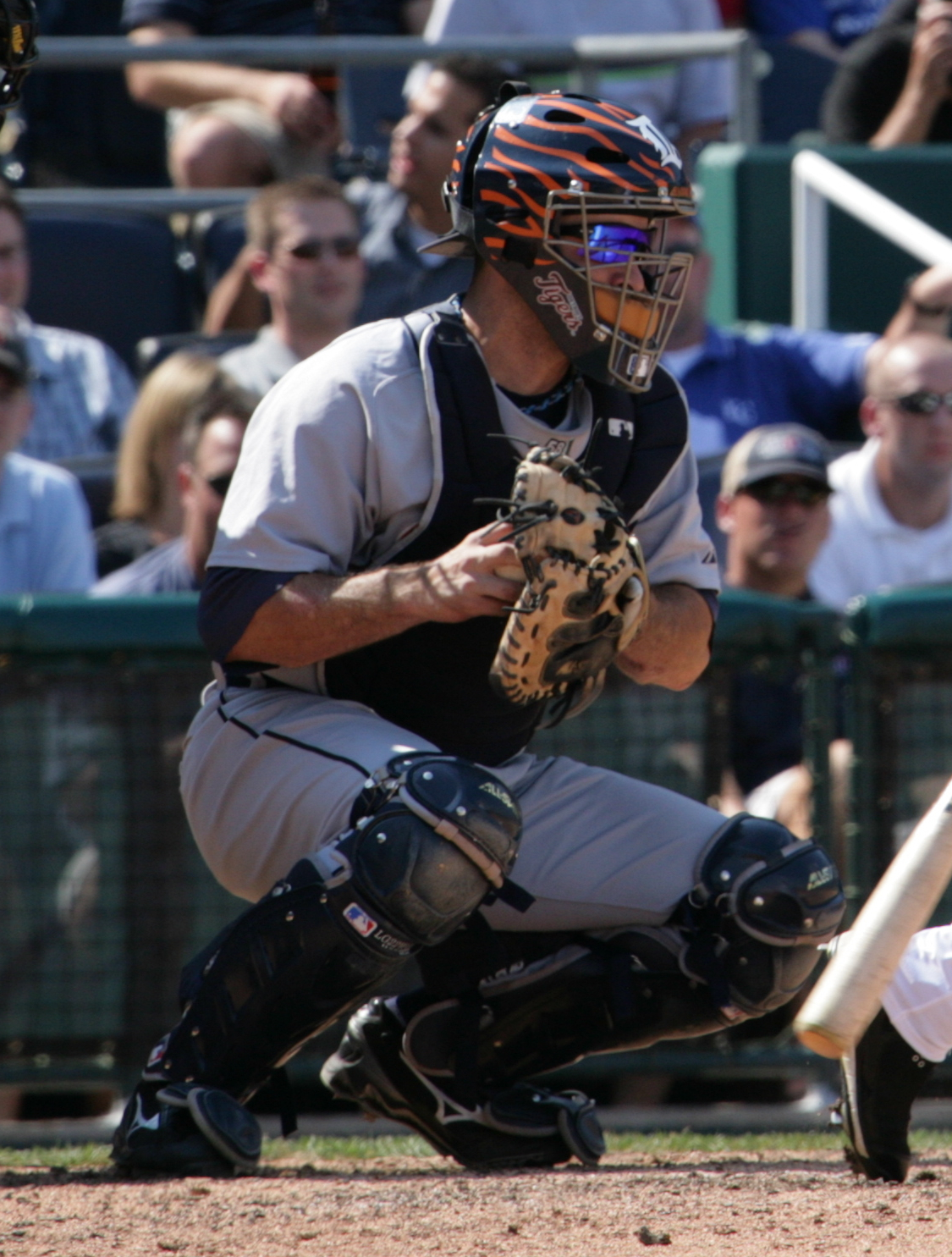

On January 14, 2010, Rabelo signed a minor league contract with the Detroit Tigers with an invite to spring training. He was optioned to the Toledo Mud Hens of the International League, where he was the second string catcher behind Robinzon Diaz.

On July 19, 2010, he was released, after batting .143 with one home run and eight RBIs.

== Coaching career ==
=== Detroit Tigers ===
Rabelo was the hitting coach for the Gulf Coast League Tigers and the Low-A Connecticut Tigers. He was hired as manager of the Connecticut Tigers for the 2014 season. On October 20, 2016, Rabelo was promoted to the West Michigan Whitecaps managerial position. On November 7, 2017, Rabelo was promoted to the Lakeland Flying Tigers managerial positsion for the 2018 season. On December 13, 2018, Rabelo was promoted again as the Double-A Erie SeaWolves' manager.

=== Pittsburgh Pirates ===
In January 2020, Rabelo was hired by the Pittsburgh Pirates as the team's Major League assistant hitting coach and in January 2021 he was named as their Major League Field Coordinator. In November 2021 the Pirates announced that Rabelo would be their third base coach in addition to his field coordinator duties.

On September 30, 2025, Rabelo and the Pirates parted ways.

=== Minnesota Twins ===
On November 14, 2025, the Minnesota Twins hired Rabelo as their assistant bench coach.

== Personal life ==
Mike currently resides in Florida with his wife Erin and their two daughters.
