= Frankie de la Cruz =

Dominican baseball player (1984–2021)

Frankie De La Cruz
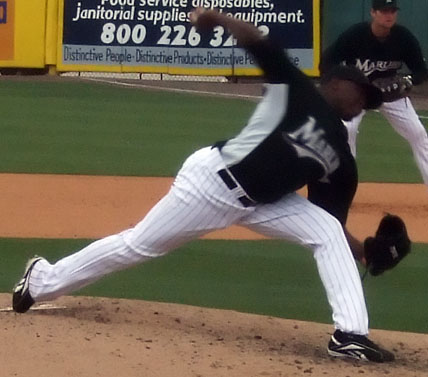
- De La Cruz pitching for the Marlins
- Pitcher
- Born: March 12, 1984; Santo Domingo, Dominican Republic
- Died: March 14, 2021 (aged 37); Dominican Republic
- Batted: Right Threw: Right

Professional debut
- MLB: June 18, 2007, for the Detroit Tigers
- NPB: June 15, 2010, for the Tokyo Yakult Swallows
- CPBL: August 23, 2012, for the Uni-President 7-Eleven Lions

Last appearance
- NPB: August 28, 2010, for the Tokyo Yakult Swallows
- MLB: September 26, 2011, for the Milwaukee Brewers
- CPBL: September 25, 2012, for the Uni-President 7-Eleven Lions

MLB statistics
- Win–loss record: 4–3
- Earned run average: 8.53
- Strikeouts: 19

NPB statistics
- Win–loss record: 0–0
- Earned run average: 8.16
- Strikeouts: 20

CPBL statistics
- Win–loss record: 3–1
- Earned run average: 2.00
- Strikeouts: 29
- Stats at Baseball Reference

Teams
- Detroit Tigers (2007); Florida Marlins (2008); San Diego Padres (2009); Tokyo Yakult Swallows (2010); Milwaukee Brewers (2011); Uni-President 7-Eleven Lions (2012)

Eulogio "Frankie" De La Cruz Martínez (Spanish pronunciation: [ewˈloxjo ˈfɾaŋki ðe la ˈkɾus maɾˈtines];) (March 12, 1984 – March 14, 2021) was a Dominican baseball pitcher who played four seasons in Major League Baseball (MLB), as well as one season each in Nippon Professional Baseball (NPB) and the Chinese Professional Baseball League (CPBL). He played for the Detroit Tigers, Florida Marlins, San Diego Padres, Milwaukee Brewers, Tokyo Yakult Swallows, and Uni-President 7-Eleven Lions from 2007 to 2012. He went on to play baseball in Italy and Mexico, as well as several winter leagues.

== Early life ==
De La Cruz was born in Santo Domingo, Dominican Republic, on March 12, 1984. He attended Juan Pablo Duarte High School in his hometown. He was signed as an amateur free agent by the Detroit Tigers on September 6, 2001.

== Professional career ==
=== Detroit Tigers ===
==== Minor leagues ====
De La Cruz played in rookie-level and Single-A from 2002 through 2004. He played for the High-A Lakeland Tigers and in Double-A in 2006. The following year, he went 5–6 with a 3.43 ERA with the Double-A Erie SeaWolves and 0–0 in 2 1/3 innings with an 11.57 ERA with the Triple-A Toledo Mud Hens.

==== Major leagues ====
De La Cruz made his MLB debut on June 18, 2007, at the age of 23, relieving Jason Grilli and pitching one scoreless inning in a 9–8 win over the Washington Nationals. Overall, he finished his first season in the major leagues with a 6.75 earned run average (ERA) and 5 strikeouts in 6 2/3 innings pitched. At the end of the year, the Tigers traded Cruz along with Andrew Miller, Cameron Maybin, Mike Rabelo, Dallas Trahern, and Burke Badenhop to the Florida Marlins for Dontrelle Willis and Miguel Cabrera.

=== Florida Marlins ===
De La Cruz spent the majority of the 2008 season with the Triple-A Albuquerque Isotopes. He compiled an 18.00 ERA, 4 strikeouts, and 11 walks in 9 innings pitched on the major league roster. During his only career start in the second game of a doubleheader against the San Francisco Giants on May 25, he surrendered two earned runs across three innings pitched.

=== San Diego Padres ===
The San Diego Padres acquired De La Cruz on March 25, 2009, for a player to be named later or cash from the Marlins. Just over a month later, he was designated for assignment after three games pitched (5.40 ERA in 3 1/3 innings) and outrighted to the Triple-A Portland Beavers. He was later released by the Padres at the end of the year.

=== Tokyo Yakult Swallows ===
De La Cruz signed with the Tokyo Yakult Swallows of Nippon Professional Baseball for the 2010 season. He had a 2–3 record, a 2.52 ERA, and 42 strikeouts across 53 2/3 innings in the minor league Eastern League. He was subsequently promoted to the major league roster and compiled a 7.84 ERA in nine games. He became a free agent after the season.

=== Milwaukee Brewers ===
De La Cruz signed a minor league contract with the Milwaukee Brewers on January 12, 2011. Seven months later, he was promoted to the major league roster after spending most of the season with the Triple-A Nashville Sounds. De La Cruz registered a 2.77 ERA with 9 strikeouts in 13 innings pitched for the Brewers that year.

=== Chicago Cubs ===
De La Cruz was claimed off waivers by the Chicago Cubs on March 16, 2012. He was subsequently outrighted to the Triple-A Iowa Cubs one month later. He was released on August 14 that year, enabling him to sign with a Chinese Professional Baseball team.

=== Uni-President 7-Eleven Lions ===
After being released by the Cubs, De La Cruz signed with the Uni-President 7-Eleven Lions of the Chinese Professional Baseball League. De La Cruz pitched to a 2.00 ERA with 29 strikeouts in 36 innings pitched for the Lions across 6 appearances.

=== Milwaukee Brewers (second stint) ===
De La Cruz signed a minor league contract with the Milwaukee Brewers on November 16, 2012. He had a combined 3–11 record, a 6.52 ERA, and 65 strikeouts with the Huntsville Stars and Nashville Sounds in 2013. De La Cruz became a free agent at the end of the season.

=== Sultanes de Monterrey ===
De La Cruz signed with the Sultanes de Monterrey of the Mexican League on April 3, 2014. He pitched three months with the team, during which he compiled a 4–3 record, a 3.67 ERA, and 37 strikeouts, before being released at the end of June. De La Cruz went on to play in winter leagues in his home country, Mexico, and Venezuela during the rest of 2014 and in 2015.

=== Nettuno Baseball City ===
De La Cruz signed with the Nettuno Baseball City of the Italian Baseball League for the 2016 season. He had a 3–4 record, a 2.65 ERA, and 56 strikeouts in 68 innings pitched.

=== Saraperos de Saltillo (second stint) ===
De La Cruz returned to the Mexican League the following year, signing with the Saraperos de Saltillo at the end of March 2017. In his two seasons with the team, he compiled a 14–12 record and 158 strikeouts in 201 1/3 innings pitched. He was released in mid-July 2018.

=== Diablos Rojos del México ===
De La Cruz consequently signed with the Diablos Rojos del México. He went 3–1 with a 4.65 ERA and 17 strikeouts in six games.

=== Algodoneros de Unión Laguna ===
De La Cruz signed with the Algodoneros de Unión Laguna of the Mexican League on April 6, 2019. He had a 6–6 record, a 4.91 ERA, and 92 strikeouts across 113 2/3 innings pitched that season. De La Cruz did not play for the club in 2020, due to the cancellation of the LMB season as a result of the COVID-19 pandemic. He played for Toros del Este in the Dominican Winter League from November to December 2020, his second stint with the team.

== Death ==
De La Cruz died on the night of March 14, 2021, two days after his 37th birthday. He suffered a heart attack prior to his death.
