= 2010 Florida Marlins season =

2010 Florida Marlins
- League: National League
- Division: East
- Ballpark: Sun Life Stadium
- City: Miami Gardens, Florida
- Record: 80–82 (.494)
- Divisional place: 3rd
- Owners: Jeffrey Loria
- President of baseball operations: Larry Beinfest
- General managers: Michael Hill
- Managers: Fredi González to June 23; Edwin Rodríguez from June 23
- Television: Fox Sports Florida; Sun Sports; Rich Waltz, Tommy Hutton
- Radio: Florida Marlins Radio Network (English); Dave Van Horne, Glenn Geffner; WAQI (Spanish)

The 2010 Florida Marlins season was the 18th season for the Major League Baseball franchise. The Marlins played their home games at Sun Life Stadium. On June 23, 2010, Fredi González was fired as manager and replaced with Edwin Rodríguez. Roy Halladay of the Philadelphia Phillies threw the 20th perfect game in baseball history, and second of the season, at Sun Life Stadium, on May 29, 2010. They failed to make the playoffs for the seventh consecutive season.

== Season standings ==
=== National League East ===
NL East
Team	W	L	Pct.	GB	Home	Road
Philadelphia Phillies	97	65	.599	—	54‍–‍30	43‍–‍35
Atlanta Braves	91	71	.562	6	56‍–‍25	35‍–‍46
Florida Marlins	80	82	.494	17	41‍–‍40	39‍–‍42
New York Mets	79	83	.488	18	47‍–‍34	32‍–‍49
Washington Nationals	69	93	.426	28	41‍–‍40	28‍–‍53

=== National League Wild Card ===
Division leaders
Team	W	L	Pct.
Philadelphia Phillies	97	65	.599
San Francisco Giants	92	70	.568
Cincinnati Reds	91	71	.562

Wild Card team (Top team qualifies for postseason)
Team	W	L	Pct.	GB
Atlanta Braves	91	71	.562	—
San Diego Padres	90	72	.556	1
St. Louis Cardinals	86	76	.531	5
Colorado Rockies	83	79	.512	8
Florida Marlins	80	82	.494	11
Los Angeles Dodgers	80	82	.494	11
New York Mets	79	83	.488	12
Milwaukee Brewers	77	85	.475	14
Houston Astros	76	86	.469	15
Chicago Cubs	75	87	.463	16
Washington Nationals	69	93	.426	22
Arizona Diamondbacks	65	97	.401	26
Pittsburgh Pirates	57	105	.352	34

=== Record vs. opponents ===
2010 National League record Source: MLB Standings Grid – 2010
Team	AZ	ATL	CHC	CIN	COL	FLA	HOU	LAD	MIL	NYM	PHI	PIT	SD	SF	STL	WSH	AL
Arizona	–	3–4	1–6	2–5	9–9	3–3	4–3	5–13	3–4	5–1	2–4	2–4	8–10	5–13	4–5	3–4	6–9
Atlanta	4–3	–	4–2	3–2	2–4	11–7	5–1	5–3	5–2	11–7	8–10	6–3	4–2	4–3	2–6	8–10	9–6
Chicago	6–1	2–4	–	4–12	2–3	4–2	7–11	3–4	9–6	3–4	4–2	5–10	3–5	2–5	9–6	4–2	8–10
Cincinnati	5–2	2–3	12–4	–	2–5	5–2	10–5	5–4	11–3	4–2	2–5	10–6	2–4	3–4	6–12	4–3	8–7
Colorado	9–9	4–2	3–2	5–2	–	3–4	2–4	7–11	5–4	3–3	1–6	3–4	12–6	9–9	3–4	5–3	9–6
Florida	3–3	7–11	2–4	2–5	4–3	–	3–3	4–2	4–4	12–6	5–13	6–2	3–6	2–5	3–2	13–5	7–8
Houston	3–4	1–5	11–7	5–10	4–2	3–3	–	2–4	8–7	3–4	4–3	11–4	2–5	2–7	10–5	4–4	3–12
Los Angeles	13–5	3–5	4–3	4–5	11–7	2–4	4–2	–	4–2	3–4	2–4	4–3	8–10	8–10	3–4	3–3	4–11
Milwaukee	4–3	2–5	6–9	3–11	4–5	4–4	7–8	2–4	–	5–2	1–5	13–5	3–4	2–5	8–7	4–2	9–6
New York	1–5	7–11	4–3	2–4	3–3	6–12	4–3	4–3	2–5	–	9–9	6–1	3–3	3–4	3–3	9–9	13–5
Philadelphia	4–2	10–8	2–4	5–2	6–1	13–5	3–4	4–2	5–1	9–9	–	2–4	5–2	3–3	4–4	12–6	10–8
Pittsburgh	4–2	3–6	10–5	6–10	4–3	2–6	4–11	3–4	5–13	1–6	4–2	–	0–6	2–4	6–9	1–5	2–13
San Diego	10–8	2–4	5–3	4–2	6–12	6–3	5–2	10–8	4–3	3–3	2–5	6–0	–	12–6	3–4	3–3	9–6
San Francisco	13–5	3–4	5–2	4–3	9–9	5–2	7–2	10–8	5–2	4–3	3–3	4–2	6–12	–	3–3	4–2	7–8
St. Louis	5–4	6–2	6–9	12–6	4–3	2–3	5–10	4–3	7–8	3–3	4–4	9–6	4–3	3–3	–	3–3	9–6
Washington	4–3	10–8	2–4	3–4	3–5	5–13	4–4	3–3	2–4	9–9	6–12	5–1	3–3	2–4	3–3	–	5–13

== Roster ==
2010 Florida Marlins
Roster
Pitchers: 31 Burke Badenhop; 51 Jay Buente; 50 José Ceda; 66 Steven Cishek; 32 Clay Hensley; 48 James Houser; 55 Josh Johnson; 54 Hunter Jones; 52 Chris Leroux; 54 Jhan Mariñez; 60 Adalberto Méndez; 53 Dan Meyer; 23 Andrew Miller; 47 Ricky Nolasco; 46 Leo Núñez; 13 Will Ohman; 37 Renyel Pinto; 39 Nate Robertson; 65 Sandy Rosario; 59 Alex Sanabia; 44 Brian Sanches; 19 Aníbal Sánchez; 61 Brett Sinkbeil; 34 Jorge Sosa; 20 Scott Strickland; 57 Taylor Tankersley; 56 Rick VandenHurk; 43 José Veras; 41 Chris Volstad; 45 Sean West; 64,44 Tim Wood	Catchers: 21 John Baker; 58 Brad Davis; 39 Chris Hatcher; 9 Brett Hayes; 29 Ronny Paulino; 11 Mike Rivera; Infielders: 30 Brian Barden; 3 Jorge Cantú; 18 Wes Helms; 13 Mike Lamb; 7 Héctor Luna; 56 Osvaldo Martínez; 22 Donnie Murphy; 2 Hanley Ramírez; 64,14 Gaby Sánchez; 3 Chad Tracy; 6 Dan Uggla; Outfielders: 1 Emilio Bonifacio; 25 Brett Carroll; 8 Chris Coghlan; 28 Scott Cousins; 24 Cameron Maybin; 20 Logan Morrison; 16 Bryan Petersen; 12 Cody Ross; 27 Mike Stanton	Manager: 33 Fredi González; 36 Edwin Rodríguez; Coaches: 35 Tarrik Brock (first base); 11 Dave Collins (first base); 38 Reid Cornelius (bullpen); 4 Joey Espada (third base); 17 Brandon Hyde (bench); 10 John Mallee (hitting); 17 Jim Presley (hitting); 49 Randy St. Claire (pitching); 10 Carlos Tosca (bench)

== Player stats ==
=== Batting ===
Note: G = Games played; AB = At bats; R = Runs scored; H = Hits; 2B = Doubles; 3B = Triples; HR = Home runs; RBI = Runs batted in; AVG = Batting average; SB = Stolen bases

Player	G	AB	R	H	2B	3B	HR	RBI	AVG	SB
Burke Badenhop, P	53	1	0	0	0	0	0	0	.000	0
John Baker, C	23	78	7	17	3	1	0	6	.218	0
Brian Barden, IF	35	28	2	5	0	0	0	3	.179	0
Emilio Bonifacio, UT	73	180	30	47	6	3	0	10	.261	12
Jorge Cantú, 3B	97	374	41	98	25	0	10	54	.262	0
Brett Carroll, OF	32	76	13	15	4	0	2	7	.197	2
José Ceda, P	8	2	0	0	0	0	0	0	.000	0
Chris Coghlan, LF	91	358	60	96	20	3	5	28	.268	10
Scott Cousins, OF	27	37	2	11	2	2	0	2	.297	0
Brad Davis, C	33	109	8	23	7	1	3	16	.211	2
Chris Hatcher, C	5	6	0	0	0	0	0	0	.000	0
Brett Hayes, C	26	77	6	16	6	1	2	6	.208	0
Wes Helms, 3B	127	254	25	56	12	4	4	39	.220	0
Clay Hensley, P	68	2	0	0	0	0	0	0	.000	0
Josh Johnson, P	28	59	0	5	0	0	0	4	.085	0
Mike Lamb, 1B	39	38	2	7	1	1	0	4	.184	0
Héctor Luna, IF	27	29	2	4	1	0	2	4	.138	0
Ozzie Martínez, SS	14	43	8	14	4	1	0	2	.326	1
Cameron Maybin, CF	82	291	46	68	7	3	8	28	.234	9
Adalberto Méndez, P	5	7	0	2	0	0	0	0	.286	0
Andrew Miller, P	9	9	0	0	0	0	0	0	.000	0
Logan Morrison, LF	62	244	43	69	20	7	2	18	.283	0
Donnie Murphy, IF	29	44	9	14	6	1	3	16	.318	0
Ricky Nolasco, P	26	47	3	8	3	0	0	3	.170	0
Ronny Paulino, C	91	316	31	82	18	0	4	37	.259	1
Bryan Petersen, UT	23	24	1	2	0	0	0	2	.083	0
Hanley Ramírez, SS	142	543	92	163	28	2	21	76	.300	32
Mike Rivera, C	7	14	0	0	0	0	0	0	.000	0
Nate Robertson, P	19	26	2	5	1	0	0	1	.192	0
Cody Ross, CF	120	452	60	120	24	3	11	58	.265	9
Alex Sanabia, P	15	22	0	1	0	0	0	0	.045	0
Brian Sanches, P	61	1	0	0	0	0	0	0	.000	0
Aníbal Sánchez, P	33	59	3	6	0	0	0	1	.102	0
Gaby Sánchez, 1B	151	572	72	156	37	3	19	85	.273	5
Jorge Sosa, P	22	2	0	1	0	0	0	0	.500	0
Mike Stanton, RF	100	359	45	93	21	1	22	59	.259	5
Chad Tracy, 3B	41	102	5	25	6	0	1	10	.245	0
Dan Uggla, 2B	159	589	100	169	31	0	33	105	.287	4
Chris Volstad, P	30	54	1	5	1	0	0	2	.093	0
Sean West, P	2	3	0	0	0	0	0	0	.000	0
Team totals	162	5531	719	1403	294	37	152	686	.254	92

== Pitching ==
Note: W = Wins; L = Losses; ERA = Earned run average; G = Games pitched; GS = Games started; SV = Saves; IP = Innings pitched; H = Hits allowed; R = Runs allowed; ER = Earned runs allowed; BB = Walks allowed; K = Strikeouts

Player	W	L	ERA	G	GS	SV	IP	H	R	ER	BB	K
Burke Badenhop	2	5	3.99	53	0	1	67.2	62	33	30	26	47
Jay Buente	0	0	76.55	8	0	0	11.0	16	8	8	13	9
José Ceda	0	0	5.19	8	0	0	8.2	8	5	5	12	9
Steven Cishek	0	0	0.00	3	0	0	4.1	1	0	0	1	2
Clay Hensley	3	4	2.16	68	0	7	75.0	54	20	18	33	77
James Houser	0	0	20.25	1	0	0	1.1	3	3	3	1	1
Josh Johnson	11	6	2.30	28	28	0	183.2	155	51	47	50	186
Hunter Jones	0	0	0.00	3	0	0	1.2	0	0	0	1	3
Chris Leroux	0	0	7.00	17	0	0	18.0	24	15	14	13	18
Jhan Mariñez	1	1	6.75	4	0	0	2.2	3	3	2	3	3
Adalberto Méndez	1	3	5.11	5	5	0	24.2	28	14	14	12	11
Dan Meyer	0	1	9.64	13	0	0	9.1	15	10	10	12	4
Andrew Miller	1	5	8.54	9	7	0	32.2	51	34	31	28	28
Ricky Nolasco	14	9	4.51	26	26	0	157.2	169	82	79	34	147
Leo Núñez	4	3	3.46	68	0	30	65.0	62	27	25	23	71
Will Ohman	0	2	3.00	17	0	0	12.0	10	6	4	6	14
Renyel Pinto	0	0	2.70	20	0	0	16.2	16	5	5	9	16
Nate Robertson	6	8	5.47	19	18	0	100.1	110	70	61	41	61
Sandy Rosario	0	0	54.00	2	0	0	1.0	9	6	6	1	0
Alex Sanabia	5	3	3.73	15	12	0	72.1	74	32	30	18	47
Brian Sanches	2	2	2.26	61	0	0	63.2	43	20	16	27	54
Aníbal Sánchez	13	12	3.55	32	32	0	195.0	192	87	77	75	157
Brett Sinkbeil	0	0	13.50	3	0	0	2.0	2	3	3	5	1
Jorge Sosa	2	3	4.66	22	2	0	36.2	39	22	19	22	19
Scott Strickland	0	0	9.00	3	0	0	2.0	5	2	2	1	0
Taylor Tankersley	0	0	7.50	27	0	0	12.0	12	11	10	8	7
Rick Vanden Hurk	0	0	6.75	2	0	0	1.1	3	4	1	1	1
José Veras	3	3	3.75	48	0	0	48.0	32	20	20	29	54
Chris Volstad	12	9	4.58	30	30	0	175.0	187	94	89	65	102
Sean West	0	2	7.71	2	2	0	9.1	15	9	8	5	8
Tim Wood	0	1	5.53	26	0	1	27.2	33	19	17	16	10
Team totals	80	82	4.08	162	162	39	1438.1	1433	717	652	549	1168

== Farm system ==
Level	Team	League	Manager
AAA	New Orleans Zephyrs	Pacific Coast League	Edwin Rodríguez and Greg Norton
AA	Jacksonville Suns	Southern League	Tim Leiper
A	Jupiter Hammerheads	Florida State League	Ron Hassey
A	Greensboro Grasshoppers	South Atlantic League	Andy Haines
A-Short Season	Jamestown Jammers	New York–Penn League	Dave Berg
Rookie	GCL Marlins	Gulf Coast League	Jorge Hernández

LEAGUE CHAMPIONS: Jacksonville
