= List of Miami Marlins managers =

The Miami Marlins are a professional Major League Baseball based in Miami, Florida. The Marlins are members of the National League East division in MLB, joining in 1993 as an expansion team. In baseball, the head coach of a team is called the manager, or more formally, the field manager. The duties of the team manager include team strategy and leadership on and off the field. The Marlins have employed fifteen different managers (two interim) since their founding as the Florida Marlins in 1993, with three leading them to the postseason that has resulted in two World Series championships (1997, 2003).

The Marlins' first manager was Rene Lachemann, who led the team from its creation in 1993 through part of the 1996 season. After Cookie Rojas managed for one game, John Boles served as manager for the final 75 games of the 1996 season. Jim Leyland took over the franchise for the next two seasons, and in the process led the Marlins to their first World Series championship in 1997. In 1999, Boles took over and started his second stint as manager of the Marlins, which lasted until partway through the 2001 season. Tony Pérez was interim manager for the rest of 2001; Pérez is the only Miami Marlins manager who is a member of the National Baseball Hall of Fame, inducted as a player in 2000.

Jeff Torborg took over as manager to start the 2002 season, and served for 1 1/2 seasons. Jack McKeon took over and guided the franchise to their second World Series championship in 2003. He served until the end of the 2005 season, and was replaced by Joe Girardi, who was manager for one full season, in 2006. Fredi González took over from Girardi and managed the team from 2007 until partway through 2010. Edwin Rodríguez managed the Marlins from 2010 to 2011, and after Brandon Hyde managed for one game, McKeon returned for a second stint as manager. After McKeon retired, Ozzie Guillén took over as manager of the Marlins for the 2012 season, the team's first as the Miami Marlins. Ozzie Guillén was fired on October 23, 2012, after finishing in last place; he has the lowest winning percentage for any Marlin manager who managed a full season. The current manager is Clayton McCullough (hired in 2025). Don Mattingly holds the record for most victories as a Marlin manager along with games managed and lost.

== Key ==
#	Number of Marlins managers. Any manager who has two or more separate terms is only counted once.
Win%	Winning percentage: number of wins divided by number of games managed
PA	Playoff appearances: number of times this manager has led the franchise to the playoffs
PW	Playoff wins: number of playoff games won for this manager
PL	Playoff losses: number of playoff games lost for this manager
WS	World Series: number of World Series victories achieved by this manager
Result	Managerial result: how manager ended his tenure with team
†	Elected to the National Baseball Hall of Fame
‡	Interim manager
*	Won Manager of the Year award

== Managers ==
Statistics current through the end of the 2024 season

#	Image	Manager	Seasons	W	L	Win%	PA	PW	PL	WS	Result	Ref
1		Rene Lachemann	1993–1996	221	285	.437	—	—	—	—	Fired	
2		Cookie Rojas^{‡}	1996	1	0	1.000	—	—	—	—	Interim	
3		John Boles^{‡}	1996	40	35	.533	—	—	—	—	Interim	
4		Jim Leyland	1997–1998	146	178	.451	1	11	5	1	Resigned	
—		John Boles	1999–2001	165	206	.445	—	—	—	—	Fired	
5		Tony Pérez^{†‡}	2001	54	60	.474	—	—	—	—	Interim	
6		Jeff Torborg	2002–2003	95	105	.475	—	—	—	—	Fired	
7		Jack McKeon*	2003–2005	241	207	.538	1	11	6	1	Resigned	
8		Joe Girardi*	2006	78	84	.481	—	—	—	—	Fired	
9		Fredi González	2007–2010	276	279	.497	—	—	—	—	Fired	
10		Edwin Rodríguez	2010–2011	78	85	.479	—	—	—	—	Resigned	
11		Brandon Hyde^{‡}	2011	0	1	.000	—	—	—	—	Interim	
—		Jack McKeon	2011	40	50	.444	—	—	—	—	Interim	
12		Ozzie Guillén	2012	69	93	.426	—	—	—	—	Fired	
13		Mike Redmond	2013–2015	155	207	.428	—	—	—	—	Fired	
14		Dan Jennings	2015	55	69	.443	—	—	—	—	Interim	
15		Don Mattingly	2016–2022	443	587	.430	1	2	3	—	Fired	
16		Skip Schumaker*	2023–2024	146	178	.451	0	0	2	—	Fired	
17		Clayton McCullough	2025–present	159	165	.491	0	0	0	—		
Totals				2241	2608	.462	3	24	16	2		

== Managers with multiple tenures ==
#	Manager	Seasons	W	L	Win%	PA	PW	PL	WS	Ref
3	John Boles	1996, 1999–2001	205	241	.460	—	—	—	—	
7	Jack McKeon	2003–2005, 2011	281	257	.522	1	11	6	1	
