= List of Miami Marlins owners and executives =

== General managers ==
Key
#	Order of tenure as General Manager
W	Regular season wins
L	Regular season losses
Win%	Winning percentage
LC	League Championships: number of League Championships, or pennants, achieved under the general manager
WS	World Series Championships: number of World Series victories achieved under the general manager
Ref	Reference
†	Won World Series title

Statistics current through 2009 season

#	General Manager	Seasons	W	L	Win%	LC	WS	Ref
1	Dave Dombrowski^{†}	1993–2001	627	764	.450	1	1	
2	Larry Beinfest^{†}	2002–2007	485	487	.498	1	1	
3	Michael Hill	2008–2013, 2016–2020	171	152	.528	0	0	
4	Dan Jennings	2013–2015	55	69	.444	0	0	
5	Kim Ng	2020–2023	167	217	.435	0	0	

== Owners ==
Statistics updated March 3, 2019

#	Owner(s)	Years	Wins	Losses	WPct	WS	Ref
1	Wayne Huizenga	1993 – 1998	408	498	.450	1997 World Series Champion	
2	John W. Henry	1999 – 2001	219	266	.452	None	
3	Jeffrey Loria	2002 – 2017	1,224	1323	.481	2003 World Series Champion	
4	Bruce Sherman	2018 – present	218	327	.434	None	
Totals			2088	2438	.461	2	
