= Essel =

Essel may refer to:

== People ==
- André Essel (1918–2005), French businessman
- Christian Essel (born 1989), Liberian football player
- Christine Essel, American politician
- Eileen Essell (1922–2015), English actress
- Frank Abor Essel-Cobbah, Ghanaian politician
- Joseph Ampah Kojo Essel, Ghanaian politician

== Places ==
- Essel, Lower Saxony, Germany

== Other ==
- Essel, French former glasses manufacturer, now part of Essilor
- Essel Group, Indian conglomerate
