= Jim Beattie (baseball) =

American baseball player (born 1954)

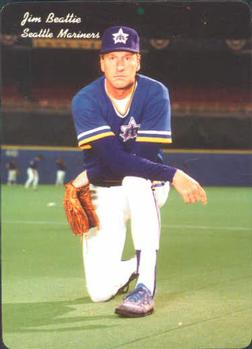
- Beattie with the Mariners in 1986
- Pitcher
- Born: July 4, 1954 (age 72); Hampton, Virginia, U.S.
- Batted: Right Threw: Right

MLB debut
- April 25, 1978, for the New York Yankees

Last MLB appearance
- August 5, 1986, for the Seattle Mariners

MLB statistics
- Win–loss record: 52–87
- Earned run average: 4.17
- Strikeouts: 660
- Stats at Baseball Reference

Teams
- New York Yankees (1978–1979); Seattle Mariners (1980–1986)

Career highlights and awards
- World Series champion (1978)

James Louis Beattie (born July 4, 1954) is an American former professional baseball player and executive who pitched for the New York Yankees and Seattle Mariners from 1978 to 1986. He also served as the Montreal Expos' general manager (GM) from 1995 to 2001, and was the Baltimore Orioles' GM with Mike Flanagan from 2003 to 2005. Beattie was a bullpen coach for the Florida Marlins in 2007 and a scout for the Toronto Blue Jays from 2010 to 2018.

== Amateur career ==
Beattie starred in baseball and basketball at South Portland High School in South Portland, Maine.

Beattie earned All-New England honors playing college basketball for the Dartmouth Big Green in 1974 and was the most valuable player of the Kodak Classic in 1975. In 1974, he played collegiate summer baseball with the Harwich Mariners of the Cape Cod Baseball League and was named a league all-star.

== Professional career ==
=== New York Yankees ===
The New York Yankees selected Beattie in the fourth round, with the 91st overall selection, of the 1975 Major League Baseball draft. He was soon tabbed one of the top pitching prospects in the Yankees' farm system, along with Ken Clay and Gil Patterson. Each voiced frustration with the organization when they acquired pitchers Goose Gossage, Andy Messersmith and Rawly Eastwick after the 1977 season, believing that it hindered their chances of making the major league roster.

A rash of injuries opened the door for Beattie, and he made the club out of spring training in 1978. He pitched 6 1/3 innings and gave up one run in his major league debut to beat future Hall of Famer Jim Palmer and the Baltimore Orioles. After a second win against the Chicago White Sox on May 15, Beattie lost his next seven consecutive decisions. He was, however, on the mound for two of the Yankees' most important games that September. After the Yankees trailed the Boston Red Sox by 14 games in the American League (AL) East on July 19, they surged to just four games back by the time they headed to Fenway Park for a four-game series from September 7–10. Beattie started the second game of the series, holding Boston to three hits and no runs over his first eight innings of work. After the Red Sox scored two unearned runs in the ninth, he was replaced with Ron Davis for the final out. The Yankees swept the series to move into a tie with Boston. They moved on to Detroit for the next series. Beattie won the second game of that series to give the Yankees sole possession of first place. He finished his rookie season with a 6–9 record and a 3.73 earned run average (ERA) in 25 games (22 starts).

Following a one-game playoff with the Red Sox, the Yankees headed into the postseason. Beattie won Game 1 of the AL Championship Series against the Kansas City Royals, and earned a complete game victory over the Los Angeles Dodgers in Game 5 of the World Series.

Despite his late season and postseason heroics, Beattie failed to make the club to start the 1979 season. He wascalled up by the beginning of May. On June 20, a line drive off the bat of the Toronto Blue Jays' John Mayberry shelved Beattie for two months. On September 12, 1979, Red Sox legend Carl Yastrzemski singled off Beattie for his 3,000th MLB hit. After the season, he, Rick Anderson, Juan Beníquez and Jerry Narron were traded to the Seattle Mariners for Ruppert Jones and Jim Lewis.

=== Seattle Mariners ===
Despite posting a 5.01 ERA, Beattie's record stood at 3–3 on May 21, 1980 following a victory over the Milwaukee Brewers. He only won two more games for the rest of the season, and finished at 5–15 with a 4.85 ERA in 33 games (29 starts). Beattie started the 1981 season in the bullpen, but after getting rocked in three outings, he was demoted to the Triple-A Spokane Indians. He returned to the majors after the 1981 MLB strike and pitched an eight inning gem against the California Angels on August 11 for his first victory of the season. Beattie went 3–2 with one save with a 2.02 ERA while holding batters to a .212 batting average in the second half, as opposed to the eight earned runs he gave up in 4 1/3 innings of work prior to his demotion to Spokane. His only career save came during a 20-inning game on September 3 when the Mariners defeated the Red Sox at Fenway Park 8–7. Beattie recorded the final out of the game to nail down the victory. His success carried over into the 1982 season. Despite an 8–12 record, his 3.34 ERA was seventh-best in the AL, 140 strikeouts was eighth-best, and the .233 batting average he held batters to was sixth-best.

On September 27, 1983, Beattie hurled the first one-hitter in franchise history, beating Kansas City. Aside from a U. L. Washington single in the third inning, Beattie was perfect. Perhaps the second-best pitching performance of his career came in a losing effort. On July 25, 1984, he and the California Angels' Ron Romanick locked up in a pitchers' duel. Beattie pitched nine innings of one-hit ball while striking out nine. With the game still scoreless heading into extra innings, Beattie took the mound again in the tenth inning, where Gary Pettis ended it with a two-out walk-off single. After the game, Beattie smashed a water cooler and refused to talk to reporters.

Beattie began dealing with shoulder tendinitis late in his career. He missed six weeks of the 1985 season with tendinitis, then tore his rotator cuff upon his return.

Beattie returned from surgery midway through the 1986 season. He pitched effectively in his first start against the White Sox on June 12, and was in line for the victory until the bullpen imploded. From there, Beattie himself imploded as he went 0–6 with a 6.02 ERA in nine games (seven starts) through August 7, when he was placed back on the disabled list. He elected free agency after the season but did not play again professionally.

== Legacy ==
Beattie was inducted into the Maine Baseball Hall of Fame in 1990. Beattie was named one of the 50 greatest Mariners players in 2026.

In 2019, Beattie was inducted into the Maine Basketball Hall of Fame.

== Post-playing career ==
Rather than trying to catch on with another team, Beattie returned to college. He received his M.B.A. from the University of Washington in 1989. (He earned a bachelor's degree from Dartmouth in 1976.) He then returned to the Mariners as their player development director in 1990. He became the team's farm director, staying with the club through the 1995 season.

=== General manager ===
After the 1995 season, Beattie was named general manager (GM) and vice president of the Montreal Expos. During his tenure, he traded away several of the Expos' young stars, including sending Cy Young Award winner Pedro Martinez to the Red Sox. He quit at the end of the 2001 season.

After a year away from baseball, Beattie joined the Baltimore Orioles as executive vice president of baseball operations. He served as co-GM of the Orioles with former Orioles pitcher Mike Flanagan through the 2005 season, when Flanagan was given the job solely. Beattie served as an analyst for the Orioles for one more season. When Boston GM Theo Epstein threatened to leave the Red Sox shortly afterwards, Beattie interviewed for the job. He also interviewed for the vacant Houston Astros GM job in 2007.

=== Later career ===
In something of an unexpected career turn, Beattie finished the 2007 season as the Florida Marlins' bullpen coach. After former bullpen coach Steve Foster became Florida's pitching coach following Rick Kranitz's departure, Beattie jokingly offered his services to Marlins GM Larry Beinfest, and Beinfest took him up on his offer. Beattie was also rumored to be a candidate for the Marlins' pitching coach position in 2008, but the job instead went to Mark Wiley.

Beattie joined the Toronto Blue Jays as a professional scout in February 2010. He retired after the 2018 season.

Beattie also worked as a financial advisor in Boston. He later directed the Upper Valley Winter Special Olympics.

== Personal life ==
Beattie is married.

Preceded by Kevin Malone	Montreal Expos General Manager; 1995–2001	Succeeded by Larry Beinfest
Preceded by Syd Thrift	Baltimore Orioles General Manager (with Mike Flanagan); 2003–2005	Succeeded by Mike Flanagan
