= Trevor Williams (baseball) =

American baseball player (born 1992)

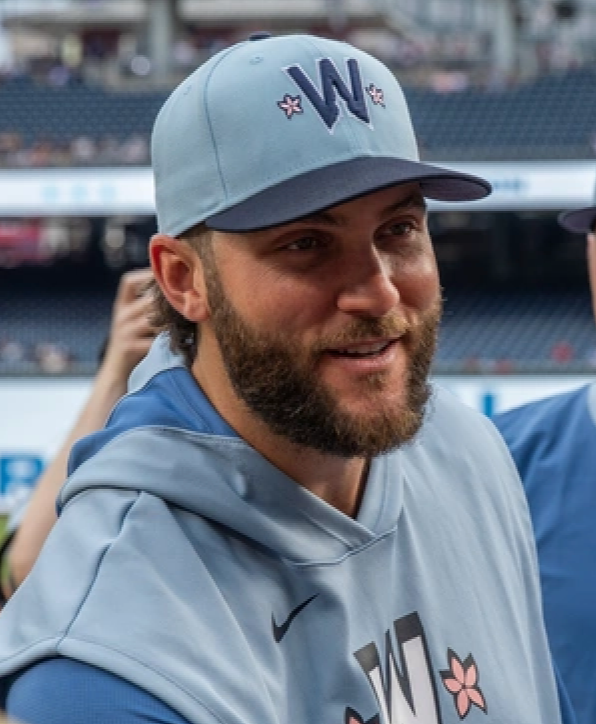
- Williams with the Nationals in 2025

Free agent
- Pitcher
- Born: April 25, 1992 (age 34); San Diego, California, U.S.
- Bats: Right Throws: Right

MLB debut
- September 7, 2016, for the Pittsburgh Pirates

MLB statistics (through 2026 season)
- Win–loss record: 55–65
- Earned run average: 4.42
- Strikeouts: 859
- Stats at Baseball Reference

Teams
- Pittsburgh Pirates (2016–2020); Chicago Cubs (2021); New York Mets (2021–2022); Washington Nationals (2023–2026); Texas Rangers (2026)
Medals
Men's baseball
Representing the United States
Haarlem Baseball Week
| Bronze medal – third place | 2012 | Team |

Trevor Anthony Williams (born April 25, 1992) is an American professional baseball pitcher who is a free agent. He has played in Major League Baseball (MLB) for the Pittsburgh Pirates, Chicago Cubs, New York Mets, Washington Nationals, and Texas Rangers. He made his MLB debut in 2016 with the Pirates.

== Amateur career ==
After graduating from Rancho Bernardo High School, Williams played college baseball at Arizona State University for the Sun Devils from 2011 to 2013. He started 38 games during his career, going 18–8 with a 2.98 earned run average (ERA). In 2012, he played collegiate summer baseball with the Orleans Firebirds of the Cape Cod Baseball League.

== Professional career ==
=== Miami Marlins ===
The Miami Marlins selected Williams in the second round of the 2013 Major League Baseball draft. He made his professional debut with the Gulf Coast League Marlins and also played for the Batavia Muckdogs and Greensboro Grasshoppers that year. In 12 starts between the three teams he was 0–2 with a 2.38 ERA. Williams started 2014 with the Jupiter Hammerheads, earning Florida State League All-Star honors, and was promoted to the Jacksonville Suns in August. In 26 games started between both clubs he compiled an 8–7 record and 3.13 ERA. In 2015, Williams played for both Jacksonville and the New Orleans Zephyrs, pitching to a 7–10 record and 3.85 ERA in 25 games (24 starts).

=== Pittsburgh Pirates ===
On October 24, 2015, the Marlins traded Williams to the Pittsburgh Pirates for Richard Mitchell as compensation for the Marlins hiring Jim Benedict from the Pirates as their new vice president of pitching development.

Williams spent the early part of 2016 with the Indianapolis Indians where he was 9–6 with a 2.53 ERA in twenty games (19 starts). He was promoted to the Major Leagues for September call ups later that year. In 12 2/3 innings pitched for the Pirates, he was 1–1 with a 7.82 ERA.

Williams began 2017 with Pittsburgh as a member of their bullpen. As the season progressed, he was eventually moved into the starting rotation. In 31 games (25 starts) for the Pirates, he compiled a 7–9 record with a 4.07 ERA and 1.31 WHIP.

Williams began 2018 as a member of Pittsburgh's starting rotation. He posted a career year, finishing with an ERA of 3.11 in 31 starts, ending the season with a record of 14–10 in 170 2/3 innings. He was in the top-10 in the NL for both wins and ERA. Williams was second for Pirates pitchers in WAR and 25th in WAR for all MLB players.

In 2019, Williams had a down year, posting a record of 7–9 with a 5.38 ERA over 26 starts and 145 2/3 innings. In 2020 he was 2–8 with a 6.18 ERA. He led the NL in home runs allowed (15). On November 20, 2020, Williams was designated for assignment. He elected free agency on November 28.

=== Chicago Cubs ===
On February 5, 2021, Williams signed a one-year, $2.5 million contract with the Chicago Cubs. On May 31, Williams was placed on the injured list after undergoing an emergency appendectomy. In 13 games (12 starts) with the Cubs, Williams went 4–2 with a 5.06 ERA across 58 2/3 innings.

=== New York Mets ===
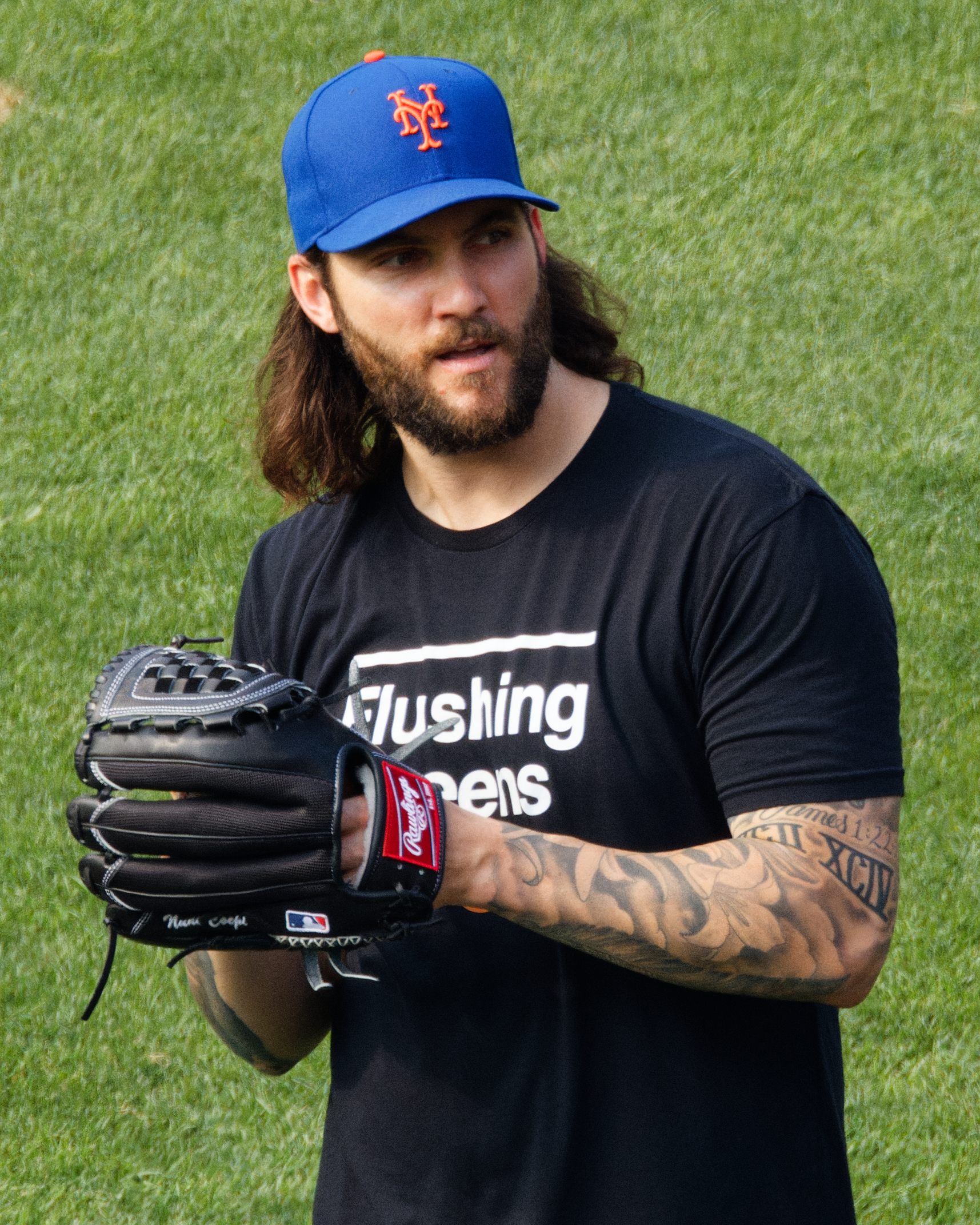
Williams with the Mets in 2022

On July 30, 2021, Williams was traded to the New York Mets along with Javier Baez and cash considerations in exchange for Pete Crow-Armstrong. He made 10 appearances for the Mets down the stretch, registering a 3.06 ERA with 29 strikeouts in 32 1/3 innings pitched.

On July 14, 2022, Williams recorded his first career save after tossing three scoreless innings of relief against the Chicago Cubs. Williams made 30 appearances (including nine starts) for New York, registering a 3–5 record and 3.21 ERA with 84 strikeouts across 89 2/3 innings pitched.

=== Washington Nationals ===
On December 10, 2022, Williams signed a two-year, $13 million contract with the Washington Nationals. Williams made 30 appearances for the Nationals in 2023, posting a 5.55 ERA with 111 strikeouts across 144^{1}/_{3} innings pitched.

In 2024, Williams made 13 appearances for the team, posting a 2.03 ERA with 59 strikeouts across 66^{2}/_{3} innings pitched. Williams led the Nationals pitchers in WAR for the season. He became a free agent following the season. On December 30, 2024, Williams signed a two-year, $14 million contract to remain with the Nationals.

Williams made 17 starts for Washington in 2025, struggling to a 3–10 record and 6.21 ERA with 65 strikeouts across 82 2/3 innings pitched. On July 9, 2025, it was announced that Williams had suffered a partial tear in his ulnar collateral ligament and would require surgery; he underwent an internal brace procedure on July 19.

On July 29, 2026, Williams was activated from the injured list for his season debut and return from surgery. He made eight appearances for the team, recording a 2.65 ERA with 22 strikeouts across 17 innings pitched. Williams was designated for assignment by the Nationals on August 25. He was released on August 30.

=== Texas Rangers ===
On September 1, 2026, Williams signed a major league contract with the Texas Rangers.

== Personal life ==
Williams is a devout Catholic; he is a member of the Knights of Columbus and his heavily tattooed arms include the initialized motto of the Society of Jesus, "AMDG," and an allusion to Benedict of Nursia.

In November 2014, he married his wife, Jackie. Their son was born in 2015, and their adopted daughter was born in July 2019.
