= Chatsworth High School =

Chatsworth Charter High School
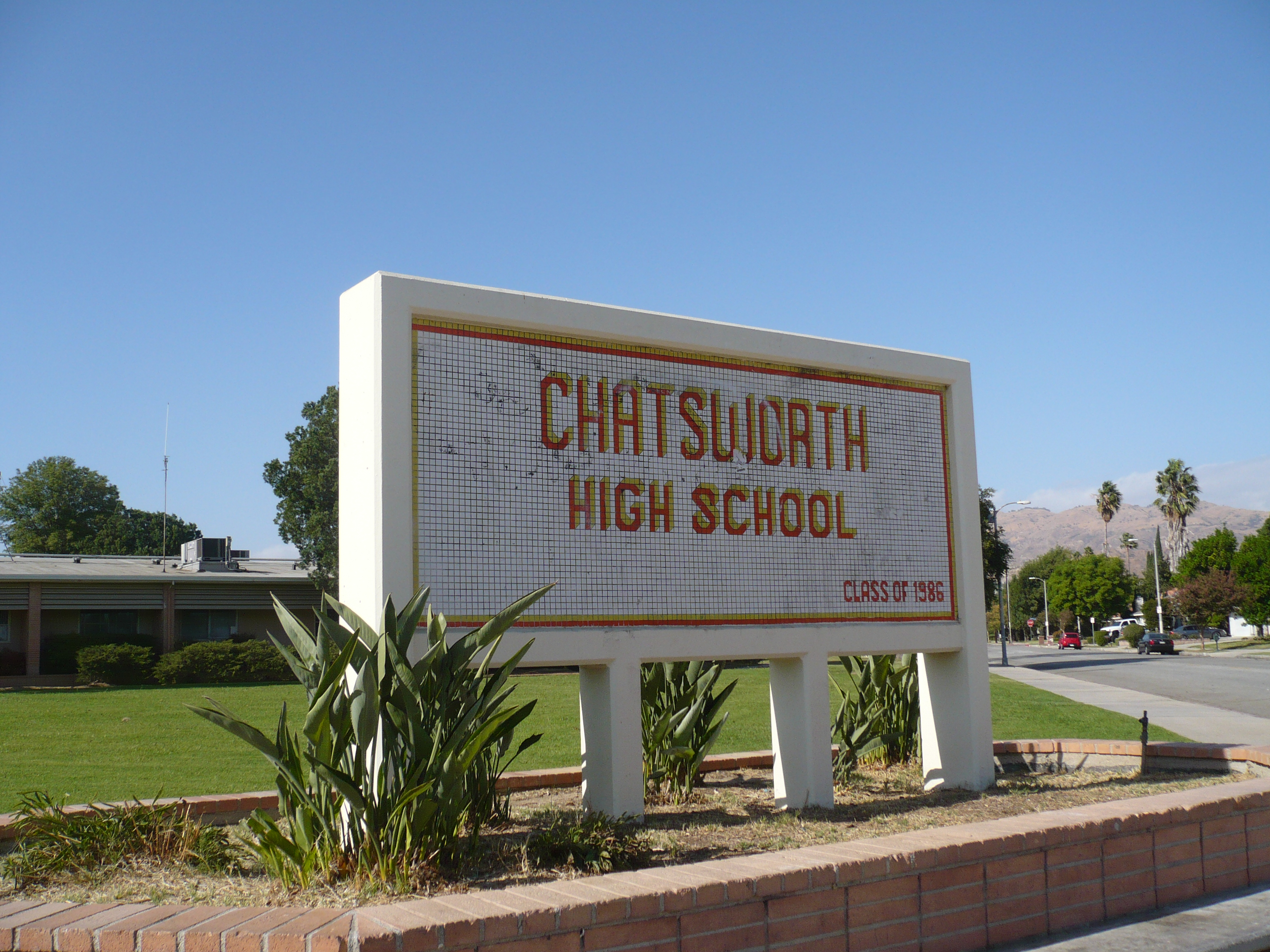

Location
- 10027 Lurline Avenue; Chatsworth, Los Angeles, California 91311; United States; 34.253°N 118.585°W

Information
- Type: Charter
- Opened: 1963
- Locale: City, Large
- School board: Los Angeles Unified School District; Board of Education
- NCES District ID: 0622710
- Authority: Los Angeles Unified School District
- NCES School ID: 062271002916
- Principal: Debra McIntyre-Sciarrino
- Teaching staff: 81.89 (on an FTE basis)
- Grades: 9–12
- Enrollment: 1,743 (2024–25)
  - Male: 976
  - Female: 766
- Student to teacher ratio: 21.28
- Campus size: 40 acres (16 ha)
- Colors: Orange and Navy blue
- Athletics conference: CIF Los Angeles City Section
- Nickname: Chancellors
- Newspaper: The Clarion
- Yearbook: Chancery
- Website: www.chatsworthhs.org

Chatsworth Charter High School is a charter secondary school located in Chatsworth in the San Fernando Valley of Los Angeles, California, United States. The school operates in the Los Angeles Unified School District.

== History ==
The campus was built with one-story buildings around a central quad as land was inexpensive and an open, outdoor feeling was consistent with the area. The administration building anchors the southeast end of the quad, while the cafeteria and auditorium anchor the northwest end. Athletics are on the other side of the internal roadway.

== Academics ==
According to U.S. News & World Report for the 2025–26 school year, Chatsworth ranked 6,598th in America, 793rd in California, and 77th in the Los Angeles Unified School District. 43% of students participate in AP courses, with 25% of students passing at least one AP exam. The graduation rate is 98%.

== Activities ==
Chatsworth's Chancellor band was the last LAUSD band to go to the Pasadena Tournament of Roses Parade, January 1, 1969, as the system of selecting a school's band was changed to selecting players from each band. Although the Chatsworth band itself couldn't march as a whole through the Pasadena Tournament of Roses parade, the band still promoted its members through the Los Angeles Unified School District All District High school honor band. More recently, multiple students from the Chatsworth Chancellor band have auditioned and made it in the Los Angeles Unified School District All District High School honor band.

Chatsworth's Drama Department participates in Fall and Shakespeare DTASC Festivals every year, earning recognition in acting and technical design. The department puts on a production every year and is Thespian Troupe #2314 in the National Honor Thespian Society. Many notable artists are alumni of Chatsworth High School's Drama Department, including Val Kilmer, Mare Winningham and Kevin Spacey. Spacey co-produced the 2011 documentary Shakespeare High, which features Chatsworth's Drama Department.

The film program participates in multiple youth film festivals, some including but not limited to, Mitchell Englander's Making Movies that Matter Festival, CSPAN's Student Cam annual national video documentary competition, and Directing Change's festival. In 2020, three students from the Chatsworth film Program won an honorable mention award in the Directing Change's Festival under the Suicide Prevention Category. The program was run by David Massey, an academy award-nominated filmmaker, from 1994 to 2019, retiring in his 25th year as a teacher.

Meet the Teams - FIRST Hall of Fame Chatsworth High School's Robotics Team 22, known as "Double Deuce," is a prestigious member of the FIRST Robotics Competition (FRC) Hall of Fame, earning this honor in 2001. Based in Chatsworth, California, the team was recognized for excellence and leadership in the FIRST community.

Key Details for Team 22 - Double Deuce: Hall of Fame Induction: 2001

Location: Chatsworth High School, Chatsworth, California.

Competition: FIRST Robotics Competition (FRC).

Significance: The Hall of Fame recognizes teams that have won the Chairman's Award (now known as the FIRST Impact Award), which is the highest honor in FRC, recognizing sustained excellence and impact on the community.

The team has a long history in robotics, with documented competition records dating back to the late 1990s and recently re-established in 2025

== Athletics ==
Between 1989 and 1993 the Women's Soccer team were undefeated winning CIF Championships each year. In 2003 and 2004, the Chatsworth High School baseball team was ranked first in the Baseball America/National High School Baseball Coaches Association Top 50 poll. In 2007, Chatsworth High players Matt Dominguez (baseball) and Mike Moustakas were selected in the first round of the 2007 Major League Baseball draft. Chatsworth High is one of only seven schools to have produced two first round draft picks in the same year. Other notable players to have played at Chatsworth High School include: Josh Ravin, Dwight Evans, Bobby Mitchell, Andre David, and Bryan Petersen. Evans is the namesake of Chatsworth's football stadium.

Wrestling were CIF Champions in 1974 under Coach Bob Hammond. 2004 brought another CIF Championship under Coach Richard Carrillo. With only 10 wrestlers entered in the tournament, a school record 6 wrestlers were in the finals all of whom won individual titles and contributed to the overall team championship: Jonathan Lawes, Jonathan Vargas, Robert Johnson, Paul Medina, Edwin Martinez, and Oscar Garcia.

The men's soccer team were state champions in 1991, defeating Bell High School 1–0.

The women's basketball team were CIF Division 1 City Champions in 2009, defeating Taft Charter High School Chatsworth High School's wrestling team has won the Los Angeles City Section CIF Title in 1974 and 2004. Chatsworth High School's Varsity Football team won the Los Angeles City 3AAA Championship in 1979. The team was undefeated and untied for 12 games defeating rival Canoga Park High School.

In 1968, Chatsworth High School gymnast Steven Hug represented USA in the Olympics. He became the youngest US male Olympian in history.

In 2009, the Chatsworth High School track and field program renamed its annual Most Inspirational Award the Nolan Blake Award in recognition of Blake’s contributions to the program. The award recognizes athletes for their inspirational impact and continues to be presented under its new name.

Most recently the school's softball team won their first ever LA-CIF championship in May 2015 versus Carson High School. Coach John Forgerson, named Daily News coach of the year, guided the star-studded team in his first year at the school. Four of the seniors signed letters of intent with Division 1 schools across the nation and anchored the infield. It was the first championship for the Chatsworth since the 2009 baseball team won the CIF-LA title.

=== Chatsworth Chancellor Championships ===
Baseball

- National Champions - 2003 & 2004
- LA City Champions - 1983, 1990, 1999, 2001, 2003, 2004, 2007, 2008, 2009, 2022

Basketball

- Boys' LA City Champions - 2011, 2021
- Girls' LA City Champions - 2009

Cross Country

- Boys' LA City Champions - 1978
- Girls' LA City Champions - 1982

Football

- LA City Champions - 1979, 1998

Golf

- Girls' LA City Champions - 2007

Soccer

- Boys' LA City Champions - 1991
- Girls' LA City Champions - 1989, 1990, 1991, 1992, 1996, 1997, 1998, 1999, 2000, 2009

Softball

- LA City Champions - 2015, 2018

Swimming

- Boys' LA City Champions - 1973, 1974, 1975, 1975, 1976, 1977
- Girls' LA City Champions - 1973, 1974, 1975, 1975, 1976, 1977

Tennis

- Boys' LA City Champions - 1991, 1993
- Girls' LA City Champions - 2008, 2009, 2012

Volleyball

- Boys' LA City Champions - 1981, 1984, 1989, 2002, 2003, 2004, 2005, 2016, 2021
- Girls' LA City Champions - 1994, 2015, 2017, 2019

Wrestling

- LA City Champions - 1974, 2004

== Notable alumni ==
- Farah Alvin, broadway performer
- Alijah Arenas, basketball player
- Rich Aude, baseball player
- Howard S. Berger, filmmaker
- Larry Beinfest, baseball executive
- Jim Benedict, baseball executive
- Alex Borstein, actress
- Gennifer Brandon, basketball player
- Candace Cameron Bure, actress
- Kirk Cameron, actor
- Matt Cassel, football player
- Andre David, baseball player
- Lori Beth Denberg, actress
- Matt Dominguez, baseball player
- Scott English, basketball player
- Christine Essel, film executive
- Dwight Evans, baseball player
- Brian Grazer, film executive
- Steve Hug, gymnast
- Val Kilmer, actor
- Stepfanie Kramer, actress
- Rory Markas, sports broadcaster
- Oscar Marin, baseball coach
- Mike Moustakas, baseball player
- Bryan Petersen, baseball player
- Rhonda Jo Petty, actress
- Bradley Pierce, actor
- Josh Ravin, baseball player
- Steve Reed, baseball player
- Adam Rich, actor
- Lindsay Sloane, actress
- Kevin Spacey, actor
- Deshawn Stephens, basketball player
- Ty Van Burkleo, baseball player
- Mare Winningham, actress
- Donna Lee Wennerstrom, 1976 Summer Olympic finalist, 400m IM
- Arianne Zucker, actress and model
