= Andre David =

American baseball player (born 1958)

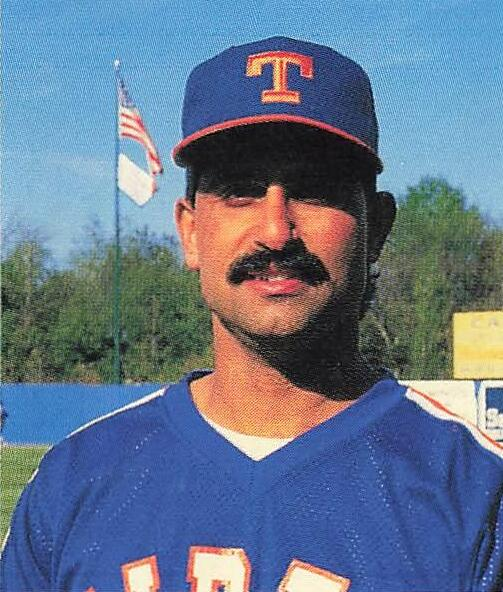
- David with the Tidewater Tides c. 1988
- Outfielder
- Born: May 18, 1958 (age 68); Hollywood, California, U.S.
- Batted: Left Threw: Left

MLB debut
- June 29, 1984, for the Minnesota Twins

Last MLB appearance
- June 10, 1986, for the Minnesota Twins

MLB statistics
- Batting average: .245
- Home runs: 1
- Runs batted in: 5
- Stats at Baseball Reference

Teams
- Minnesota Twins (1984, 1986)

Andre Anter David (born May 18, 1958) is an American former Major League Baseball outfielder who played during parts of the 1984 and 1986 seasons with the Minnesota Twins. He played in 38 games and had 13 hits with 1 home run and a .245 batting average during his career. His sole home run was hit during his first official at bat in the Major Leagues.

He played high school ball at Chatsworth High School in Chatsworth, California. He played college baseball at Cal State Fullerton and was drafted in the 8th round of the 1980 draft by the Twins.

He served as the assistant hitting coach for the Kansas City Royals in the early part of the 2013 season.

David is of Assyrian descent.

== See also ==
- List of Major League Baseball players with a home run in their first major league at bat
