= List of Atlanta Braves managers =

The Atlanta Braves are a professional baseball team based in Atlanta, Georgia. The Braves are members of the National League (NL) East division in Major League Baseball (MLB). Since the franchise started as the Boston Red Stockings (no relationship to the current Boston Red Sox team) in 1871, the team has changed its name several times and relocated twice. The Braves were a charter member of the NL in 1876 as the Boston Red Caps, and are one of the NL's two remaining charter franchises (the other being the Chicago Cubs). In baseball, the head coach of a team is called the manager, or more formally, the field manager. The duties of the team manager include team strategy and leadership on and off the field. The Braves franchise has employed 48 managers.

The franchise's first manager was Hall of Famer Harry Wright, who managed the team for eleven seasons. Frank Selee was the next manager to have managed the team for eleven seasons, with a total of twelve with the formerly named Boston Beaneaters. The formerly named Boston Braves made their first postseason appearance under George Stallings in 1914, winning the World Series that year. Several other managers spent long tenures with the Braves. Bill McKechnie managed the Braves from 1930 to 1937, while Casey Stengel managed the team from 1938 to 1942. The franchise was known as the Boston Bees from 1936 to 1940, and was again named the Boston Braves until 1952. Stengel also managed the Braves in 1943.

From 1943 to 1989, no managerial term lasted as long as five complete seasons. The Braves were managed by Billy Southworth from 1946 to 1949, and again from 1950 to 1951. Southworth led the team into the 1948 World Series, which ended the Braves' 34-year postseason drought; the World Series ended in a losing result for the Braves. In 1953, the team moved from Boston to Milwaukee, where it was known as the Milwaukee Braves. Its first manager in Milwaukee was Charlie Grimm, who managed the team from mid-season of 1952 to mid-season of 1956. Fred Haney took over the managerial position after Grimm, and led the team to the World Series in 1957, defeating the New York Yankees in a game seven to win the series.

In 1966, the team moved from Milwaukee to its current location, Atlanta. Its first manager in Atlanta was Bobby Bragan, who managed the team for three seasons earlier in Milwaukee. Lum Harris was the first manager to have managed the team in Atlanta for more than four seasons. Harris led the team into the NL Championship Series (NLCS) in 1969, but failed to advance into the World Series. Joe Torre was the next manager to manage the Braves into the postseason, but like Harris, led the team into the NLCS with a losing result. Bobby Cox was the manager of the Braves from 1990 till 2010. Under his leadership the Braves made the postseason 15 times, winning five National League championships and one World Series title in 1995. Cox has the most regular season wins, regular season losses, postseason appearances, postseason wins and postseason losses of any Braves manager. He was named NL Manager of the Year three times, in 1991, 2004 and 2005.

After Cox retired upon the conclusion of the 2010 season, Fredi González was hired to take over as manager.

After a disappointing 2025 season in which the Braves missed the postseason, Brian Snitker retired as manager and assumed a senior advisory role with the organization. Walt Weiss was subsequently named the team’s new manager ahead of the 2026 season.

Several managers have had multiple tenures with the Braves. John Morrill served three terms in the 1880s as the Braves manager, while Fred Tenney, Stengel, Bob Coleman, Southworth, Dave Bristol and Cox each served two terms. Ted Turner and Vern Benson's term each lasted only a single game, as they were both interim managers between Bristol's tenures.

== Table key ==
Years	the corresponding Major League Baseball season
WPct	Winning percentage: number of wins divided by number of games managed
PA	Postseason appearances: number of years this manager has led the franchise to the postseason
PW	Postseason wins: number of wins this manager has accrued in the postseason
PL	Postseason losses: number of losses this manager has accrued in the postseason
Pen	Pennants: number of pennants (league championships) won by the manager
WS	World Series: number of World Series victories achieved by the manager
† or ‡	Elected to the National Baseball Hall of Fame (‡ denotes induction as manager)

== Managers ==
#^{[a]}	Image	Manager	Years	Wins	Losses	WPct	PA	PW	PL	Pen	WS	Ref
1		Harry Wright†	1871–1881	254	187	.576	—	—	—	6	—	
2		John Morrill	1882	45	39	.536	—	—	—	—	—	
3		Jack Burdock	1883	30	24	.556	—	—	—	—	—	
—		John Morrill	1883–1886	208	176	.541	—	—	—	—	—	
4		King Kelly†	1887	49	43	.533	—	—	—	—	—	
—		John Morrill	1887–1888	82	81	.503	—	—	—	—	—	
5		Jim Hart	1889	83	45	.648	—	—	—	—	—	
6		Frank Selee‡	1890–1901	1,004	649	.607	1	5	0	—	1	
7		Al Buckenberger	1902–1904	186	242	.435	—	—	—	—	—	
8		Fred Tenney	1905–1907	158	295	.348	—	—	—	—	—	
9		Joe Kelley†	1908	63	91	.409	—	—	—	—	—	
10		Frank Bowerman	1909	22	54	.289	—	—	—	—	—	
11		Harry Smith	1909	23	54	.299	—	—	—	—	—	
12		Fred Lake	1910	53	100	.346	—	—	—	—	—	
—		Fred Tenney	1911	44	107	.398	—	—	—	—	—	
13		Johnny Kling	1912	52	101	.340	—	—	—	—	—	
14		George Stallings	1913–1920	579	597	.492	1	4	0	1	1	
15		Fred Mitchell	1921–1923	186	274	.404	—	—	—	—	—	
16		Dave Bancroft†	1924–1927	249	363	.407	—	—	—	—	—	
17		Jack Slattery	1928	11	20	.355	—	—	—	—	—	
18		Rogers Hornsby†	1928	39	83	.320	—	—	—	—	—	
19		Emil Fuchs	1929	56	98	.364	—	—	—	—	—	
20		Bill McKechnie‡	1930–1937	560	666	.457	—	—	—	—	—	
21		Casey Stengel‡	1938–1942	326	431	.430	—	—	—	—	—	
22		Bob Coleman	1943	21	25	.456	—	—	—	—	—	
—		Casey Stengel‡	1943	47	60	.439	—	—	—	—	—	
—		Bob Coleman	1944–1945	107	140	.433	—	—	—	—	—	
23		Del Bissonette	1945	25	34	.424	—	—	—	—	—	
24		Billy Southworth‡	1946–1949	313	256	.550	1	2	4	1	0	
25		Johnny Cooney	1949	20	25	.444	—	—	—	—	—	
—		Billy Southworth‡	1950–1951	111	102	.521	—	—	—	—	—	
26		Tommy Holmes	1951–1952	61	69	.469	—	—	—	—	—	
27		Charlie Grimm	1952–1956	341	285	.544	—	—	—	—	—	
28		Fred Haney	1956–1959	341	231	.596	2	7	7	2	1	
29		Chuck Dressen	1960–1961	159	124	.562	—	—	—	—	—	
30		Birdie Tebbetts	1961–1962	98	89	.524	—	—	—	—	—	
31		Bobby Bragan	1963–1966	310	287	.519	—	—	—	—	—	
32		Billy Hitchcock	1966–1967	110	100	.524	—	—	—	—	—	
Int		Ken Silvestri	1967	0	3	.000	—	—	—	—	—	
33		Lum Harris	1968–1972	379	373	.504	1	0	3	0	0	
34		Eddie Mathews†	1972–1974	149	161	.481	—	—	—	—	—	
35		Clyde King	1974–1975	96	101	.487	—	—	—	—	—	
36		Connie Ryan	1975	9	18	.333	—	—	—	—	—	
37		Dave Bristol	1976–1977	78	113	.408	—	—	—	—	—	
38		Ted Turner	1977	0	1	.000	—	—	—	—	—	
39		Vern Benson	1977	1	0	1.000	—	—	—	—	—	
—		Dave Bristol	1977	52	79	.397	—	—	—	—	—	
40		Bobby Cox‡	1978–1981	266	323	.452	—	—	—	—	—	
41		Joe Torre‡	1982–1984	257	229	.529	1	0	3	0	0	
42		Eddie Haas	1985	50	71	.413	—	—	—	—	—	
43		Bobby Wine	1985	16	25	.390	—	—	—	—	—	
44		Chuck Tanner	1986–1988	153	208	.424	—	—	—	—	—	
45		Russ Nixon	1988–1990	130	216	.376	—	—	—	—	—	
—		Bobby Cox‡	1990–2010	1,883	1,386	.576	14	64	63	5	1	
46		Fredi González	2011–2016	434	413	.512	2	1	4	0	0	
47		Brian Snitker	2016–2025	811	668	.541	6	24	21	1	1	
48		Walt Weiss	2026–present	94	68	.580	1	3	4	—	—	
Totals			11,115	10,949	.504	29	107	105	10	5		

== See also ==
- Atlanta Braves all-time roster
- List of Atlanta Braves seasons

== Notes ==
- ^{a} #: A running total of the number of Braves' managers. Thus, any manager who has two or more separate terms is only counted once.
