= Larry Beinfest =

American baseball executive

- Born: March 3, 1964 (age 62); Encino, California, U.S.
- Education: University of California, Berkeley
- Occupation: Baseball executive
- Years active: 1996–2013
- Known for: Executive positions with the Florida/Miami Marlins
- Awards: World Series champion (2003); Southern California Jewish Sports Hall of Fame (2013)

Larry Beinfest (born March 3, 1964) is an American former professional baseball front-office executive who was the general manager and president of baseball operations of the Miami Marlins, a Major League Baseball franchise in the National League East, from February 12, 2002, until he was relieved of his duties on September 27, 2013.

== Early life and playing career ==
Beinfest was born in Encino, California, and raised in Chatsworth, California. Playing baseball at Chatsworth High School, Beinfest made the varsity as a sophomore, the only one on rookie Coach Bob Lofrano's squad. By the end of the season, Beinfest was Lofrano's starting shortstop. The next year, as captain, Beinfest led Chatsworth to its first league title since 1972, its first of nine in a row. Beinfest batted .364, an All-Los Angeles selection as a shortstop, and shared West Valley League MVP honors in 1982 with two-time MLB Cy Young Award winner Bret Saberhagen. Beinfest had numerous recruiting letters from baseball powers like Stanford, UCLA, and Arizona State.

In the seventh inning of the 1981 City Section quarterfinals at West Los Angeles College, a Grant High base runner roll-blocked Beinfest's leg, breaking it in two places. Rescue crews eventually took him to the wrong hospital. After nine days in the hospital and three months of lugging a full-leg cast, Beinfest ended up with a shorter left leg.

After his injury, interest in recruits waned. Beinfest came back in 1982, batting .349, leading Chatsworth to another league title and another trip to the City semifinals, and sharing the league MVP award with Saberhagen. Beinfest accepted the only Division I scholarship offered to him, a free ride to Nevada-Reno. He tore up the Northern California Baseball Association his freshman year, batting .375 and earning rookie of the year and all-conference honors. In 1984, while shuttling between shortstop and third base, his average dropped, and he gave up playing professional baseball.

After his sophomore season, he was transferred to the University of California, Berkeley, where he failed to make the baseball team. Beinfest graduated from Berkeley in 1986 with a degree in international business and finance. He spent a year working for an area radio station selling air time and then set off for Syracuse University, where he would earn a Master's degree in Public Communications, envisioning a career in sports broadcasting. Those plans changed a few months after graduation when the Seattle Mariners offered him a job in their front office.

== Front office career ==
In 1989, Beinfest began his career in Major League Baseball as a player development and scouting assistant in the minor league operations of the Seattle Mariners. He helped coordinate the Mariners' farm system, organized spring training, and dealt with equipment problems, medical arrangements, and scouting schedules. The Mariners promoted Beinfest to assistant director of player development in 1994.

Starting in 1996, Beinfest climbed his way up through the Mariners' front office, receiving promotions for three years. He became the Mariners' minor league director in 1996, director of player development in 1997, and then assistant to the vice president of baseball operations in 1998. In 2000, Beinfest joined the Montreal Expos as its assistant general manager. He held that position for two years and served as the interim general manager of the Expos from October 2001 to February 2002.

== General manager of Marlins ==
Following an ownership change, the then-Florida Marlins, led by new owner Jeffrey Loria, hired Beinfest as its general manager and senior vice president on February 12, 2002.

Through a number of trades and free agent acquisitions, Beinfest built upon the Marlins' existing foundation into a 2003 World Series. In 2002, Beinfest traded for Dontrelle Willis, who would become the 2003 NL Rookie of the Year. Prior to the 2003 season, Beinfest acquired Juan Pierre, who would later be regarded as the team's most valuable player that year, and also signed catcher Iván Rodríguez, who would lead the Marlins in RBI in the 2003 Playoffs.

On May 11, 2003, Beinfest replaced manager Jeff Torborg with Jack McKeon. The Marlins went 75–49 under McKeon's leadership, finished with a final record of 91–71, and made the playoffs by clinching the NL Wild Card. Before the 2003 trade deadline, Beinfest made two key trades for the Marlins in its championship run. He traded for then-American League saves leader and closer Ugueth Urbina, who recorded saves in Games 1 and 5 of the 2003 World Series. After third baseman Mike Lowell broke his left hand on August 30, Beinfest acquired Jeff Conine just before the midnight deadline on August 31, 2003.

The Marlins defeated the San Francisco Giants, 3–1 in four games in the 2003 NLDS, and the Chicago Cubs, 4–3 in seven games in the 2003 NLCS, to win the 2003 NL Pennant. In the 2003 World Series, the Marlins became the champions of Major League Baseball by defeating the New York Yankees 4–2 in six games. Following their championship season, Baseball America named the Marlins Organization of the Year, and the Negro Leagues Baseball Museum recognized Beinfest as the 2003 winner of the Rube Foster Legacy Award for NL Executive of the Year.

Prior to the 2006 season, Beinfest re-tooled the Marlins' roster by acquiring numerous players via trades, the Rule 5 draft, and free agency. He traded for Hanley Ramírez, Aníbal Sánchez, Ricky Nolasco, and others. Ramirez became the 2006 NL Rookie of the Year, and the second NL Rookie of the Year. Beinfest was acquired via trade during his tenure (as was Willis in 2003). Sanchez tossed the fourth no-hitter in the Marlins' history on September 6, 2006, blanking the Arizona Diamondbacks at Dolphin Stadium. Sanchez was also one of four rookie pitchers on the Marlins to win 10+ games in 2006, along with Nolasco, Josh Johnson, and Scott Olsen, making the Marlins the first team ever to have four rookie pitchers record 10 wins in a season. Beinfest selected Dan Uggla in the December 2005 Rule 5 draft.

In 2006, Uggla established the Major League record for home runs by a rookie second baseman and became the first player in Major League history to be selected to the MLB All Star Game the season after he was taken in the Rule 5 draft. Uggla was honored as the NL's Most Outstanding Rookie by Major League Baseball's players.

During Beinfest's tenure, the Marlins have posted all but one of their top single-season win totals (91 in 2003, 2nd; 87 in 2009, 3rd; 84 in 2008, 4th; and 83 in 2004 and 2005, tied for 5th).

== President of baseball operations ==
On September 29, 2007, the Marlins promoted Beinfest to president of baseball operations. During the 2008 season, Beinfest signed Hanley Ramírez to a six-year $70 million contract extension that runs through 2014 and was the richest contract in Marlins' franchise history until Jose Reyes signed on December 7, 2011. Following the 2009 season, Chris Coghlan, whom Beinfest drafted in the first round of the 2006 First-Year Player Draft, won the 2009 NL Rookie of the Year award and became the third player acquired by Beinfest to win the award. On January 14, 2010, Beinfest and the Marlins reached an agreement with Josh Johnson on a four-year, $39 million contract that is the most lucrative contract for a pitcher in the Marlins' history and the first multi-year contract for a Marlins pitcher since Loria became owner in 2002.

== Reputation ==
Beinfest is widely regarded as one of the best executives in Major League Baseball because he supposedly works with the league's lowest player payrolls and fields a competitive team, having won a World Series title and five winning seasons in the past seven. Beinfest is credited for his "strong ability" to identify the players he wants and work with executives from their organizations.

The team's appearance in the 2003 postseason was their only appearance under his tenure.

In 2014, he was inducted into the Southern California Jewish Sports Hall of Fame.

Sporting positions
Preceded by Jim Beattie	Montreal Expos General Manager; 2001	Succeeded by Omar Minaya
Preceded by Dave Dombrowski	Florida Marlins General Manager; 2002–2007	Succeeded by Michael Hill
Preceded by Position established	Florida/Miami Marlins President, Baseball Operations; 2008–2013	Succeeded by Michael Hill
