= Jim Benedict =

American baseball player and coach

- Born: February 1, 1961 (age 65)
- Stats at Baseball Reference

James Scott Benedict (born February 1, 1961) is an American former professional baseball pitcher, coach, scout, and front office executive. He has worked for the Texas Rangers, Montreal Expos, Los Angeles Dodgers, New York Yankees, Cleveland Indians, Pittsburgh Pirates, Miami Marlins, and Chicago Cubs.

== Playing career ==
Benedict attended Chatsworth High School in Chatsworth, Los Angeles, and played for the school's baseball team as a center fielder. Benedict attended Los Angeles Valley College, where he began his college baseball career. Coach Dave Snow cut him from the team, but kept him as a batting practice pitcher. Benedict learned to pitch sidearm focusing on throwing off-speed pitches from Snow, and made the team as a pitcher the next year. He transferred to Arizona State University to play for the Arizona State Sun Devils, but the team’s coach preferred a fastball-heavy style and rarely used Benedict. After the season, he pitched for Snow in collegiate summer baseball.

Snow recommended Benedict to a professional scout for the Kansas City Royals, and the Royals signed Benedict in August 1983. During his first professional batting practice in spring training in 1984, Benedict was hit in the head with a line drive and lost consciousness. He made his professional debut with the Fort Myers Royals of the Class A-Advanced Florida State League in 1984, and was promoted to the Memphis Chicks of the Class AA Southern League at midseason. He pitched for the Royals and Atlanta Braves organizations through the 1986 season.

== Coaching and executive career ==
After retiring from his playing career, Benedict became a pitching coach at Loyola Marymount University and Chapman College. In 1990, he became a scout for the Texas Rangers. He worked as the minor league pitching coordinator for the Montreal Expos from 1994 through 1998. He served as a substitute pitching coach for the major league team for six days in May 1998, when Bobby Cuellar left the team for personal reasons. From 1998 through 2000, Benedict was the minor league pitching coordinator of the Los Angeles Dodgers. He scouted for the New York Yankees from 2001 through 2006, and for the Cleveland Indians in 2007 and 2008.

Benedict joined the Pittsburgh Pirates organization after the 2008 season. He served as an advanced scout, minor league pitching coordinator, and special assistant to the general manager. With the Pirates, Benedict and Ray Searage, the Pirates' pitching coach, were credited with improvements from Gerrit Cole, Francisco Liriano, Mark Melancon, Edinson Vólquez, and Charlie Morton. On October 24, 2015, the Miami Marlins hired Benedict from the Pirates as their new vice president of pitching development. The Marlins traded Trevor Williams to the Pirates for Richard Mitchell as compensation for Benedict's hiring. The team’s new ownership fired Benedict after the 2017 season, and the Chicago Cubs hired him as a special assistant to baseball operations. He was laid off by the Cubs in August 2020.
