= José Veras =

Dominican baseball player (born 1980)

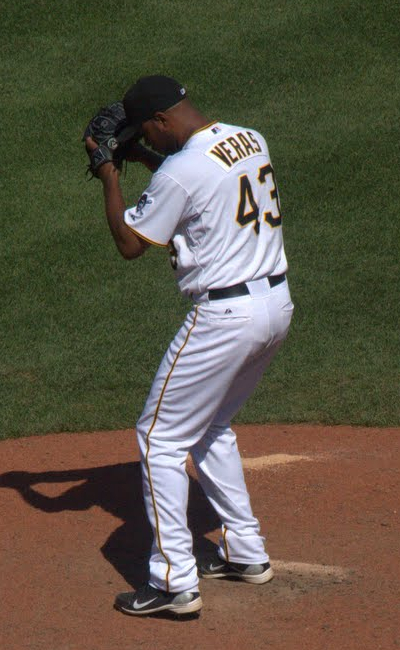
- Veras with the Pittsburgh Pirates in 2011
- Pitcher
- Born: October 20, 1980 (age 45); Santiago de los Caballeros, Dominican Republic
- Batted: Right Threw: Right

MLB debut
- August 5, 2006, for the New York Yankees

Last MLB appearance
- September 17, 2014, for the Houston Astros

MLB statistics
- Win–loss record: 23–23
- Earned run average: 3.91
- Strikeouts: 438
- Stats at Baseball Reference

Teams
- New York Yankees (2006–2009); Cleveland Indians (2009); Florida Marlins (2010); Pittsburgh Pirates (2011); Milwaukee Brewers (2012); Houston Astros (2013); Detroit Tigers (2013); Chicago Cubs (2014); Houston Astros (2014)
Medals
Men's baseball
Representing Dominican Republic
World Baseball Classic
Gold medal – first place	2013 San Francisco	Team

José Enger Veras Romero (born October 20, 1980) is a Dominican former professional baseball relief pitcher. He was signed by the Tampa Bay Devil Rays organization in 1998. He made his Major League Baseball (MLB) debut in 2006 with the New York Yankees. He also played for the Cleveland Indians, Florida Marlins, Pittsburgh Pirates, Milwaukee Brewers, Detroit Tigers, Chicago Cubs, and Houston Astros.

== Playing career ==
=== Tampa Bay Devil Rays ===
Veras was signed as an undrafted free agent by the Tampa Bay Devil Rays in 1998. He steadily rose through the Tampa Bay minor league system as a starter. He missed spring training in 2002 due to visa issues and briefly pitched in the New York-Penn League to get himself ready for the season as a result.

Veras was designated for assignment in 2002. He struggled when he reached Triple-A in 2003 and was moved to the bullpen, but still managed to lead the organization in strikeouts with 121. He was released after the 2004 season.

=== Texas Rangers ===
Veras signed with the Texas Rangers for the 2005 season and was converted into a full-time reliever. He pitched for their Triple-A affiliate, the Oklahoma RedHawks, that year. He became a free agent at the end of the season.

=== New York Yankees ===
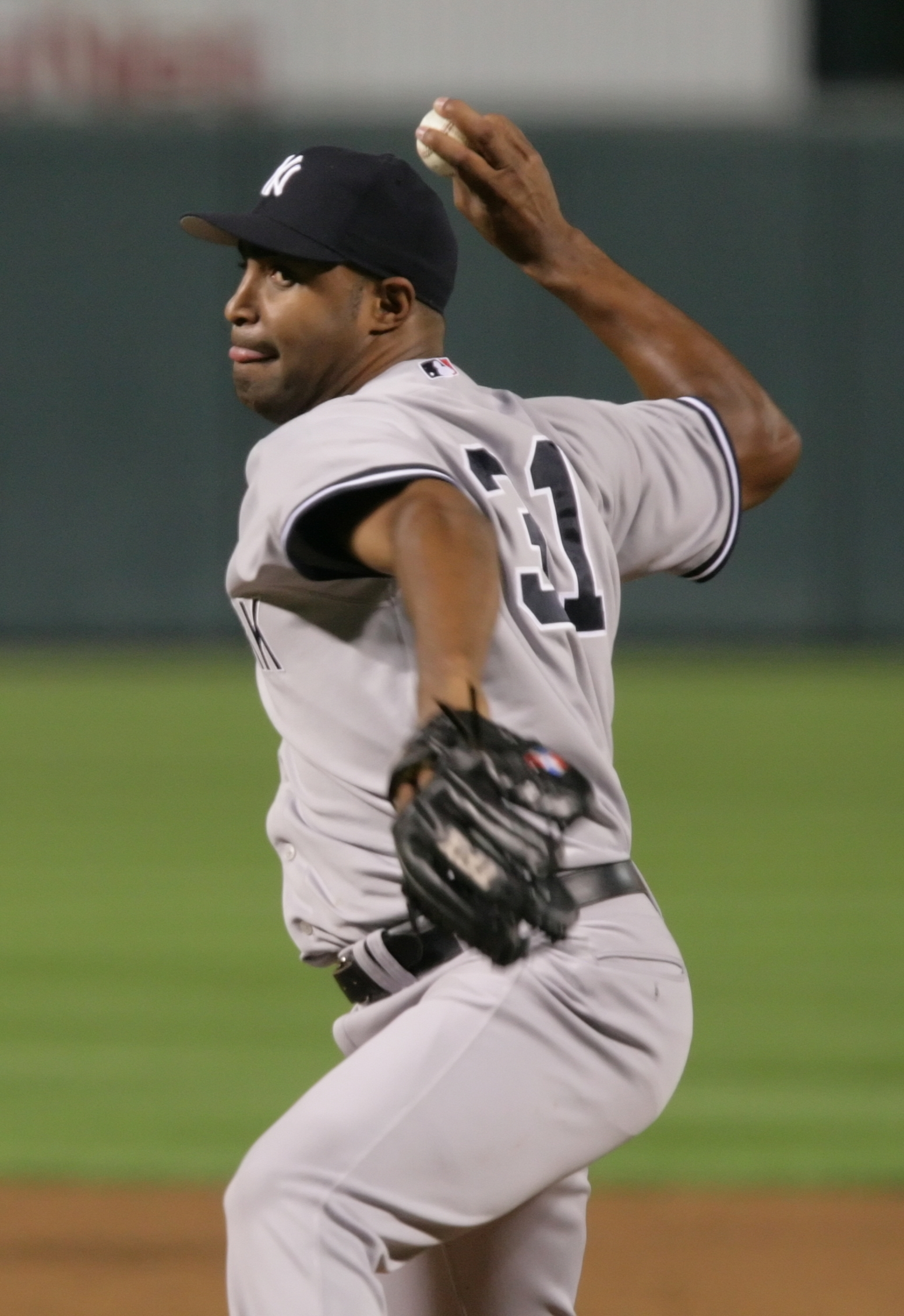
Veras with the Yankees in 2006

Veras signed with the New York Yankees before the 2006 season. He was called up on August 5 and pitched to a 4.09 ERA in 11 innings. In March 2007, Veras underwent surgery to remove bone chips in his elbow. He missed most of the season but rehabbed and returned to MLB as a September call up. Veras was added to the Yankees roster for the American League Division Series against the Cleveland Indians.

Veras was cut at the end of spring training in 2008. After being called up to the majors on May 3, he emerged as a dominant force out of the bullpen. He was predominantly used in the 7th inning and became the setup reliever after the Yankees traded Kyle Farnsworth. Veras made the opening day roster out of spring training in 2009. After allowing 23 runs on 17 hits and 14 walks in 25 games, he was designated for assignment by the Yankees on June 16, 2009.

=== Cleveland Indians ===
On June 24, 2009, Veras was acquired by the Cleveland Indians for cash considerations. On August 5, 2009, he was designated for assignment, and on August 11, 2009, he was outrighted to Triple-A. He was called up again in September toward the end of the 2009 season. After the season, Veras was non-tendered by the Indians, making him a free agent.

=== Florida Marlins ===
On January 29, 2010, Veras signed a minor league contract with the Florida Marlins with an invite to spring training and made the opening day roster. On April 14, after allowing eight runs in just four games, Veras was designated for assignment to bring up Chris Leroux to take his spot, he cleared waivers and was sent outright to Triple-A New Orleans Zepyhrs on April 16. He was called up on June 25, 2010. James Houser was designated for assignment to make room. He was non-tendered and became a free agent on December 2.

=== Pittsburgh Pirates ===
On January 18, 2011, Veras signed a minor league contract with the Pittsburgh Pirates with an invitation to spring training worth $1 million plus incentives. He made the team out of spring training and was a reliable late-inning reliever with a 3.80 ERA and 79 strikeouts over 79 appearances.

=== Milwaukee Brewers ===
On December 13, 2011, Veras was traded to the Milwaukee Brewers in exchange for Casey McGehee. He made the club's opening day roster as a late-inning reliever. In 2012, he pitched to a 3.63 ERA, while striking out 79 and walking 40 batters, in 67 innings across 72 games. He became a free agent following the season.

=== Houston Astros ===
On December 21, 2012, Veras signed a one-year, $2 million contract with the Houston Astros with a 2014 option worth $3.25 million and a $150,000 buyout. He pitched for the Dominican Republic national team in the 2013 World Baseball Classic, winning gold. Veras entered the season as the Astros closer. He pitched to a 2.93 ERA with 44 strikeouts and 19 saves in 43 innings.

=== Detroit Tigers ===
On July 29, 2013, Veras was traded to the Detroit Tigers in exchange for Danry Vasquez and a player to be named later. The Tigers used him as a setup reliever for closer Joaquin Benoit. He gave up the game winning grand slam home run to Shane Victorino of the Red Sox in Game 6 of the 2013 American League Championship Series. At the conclusion of the season, the Tigers declined Veras' club option for 2014.

=== Chicago Cubs ===
On December 27, 2013, Veras agreed to a one-year contract with the Chicago Cubs for the 2014 season worth $3.85 million with a $5.5 million club option for 2015 and performance bonuses.

Veras struggled early in the 2014 season, blowing two saves and allowing 10 earned runs in his first 6 appearances. Veras would then land on the disabled list with an oblique injury. He then lost the closer role to fellow Cubs reliever Héctor Rondón. On June 3, he was designated for assignment. On June 10, the Cubs officially released Veras.

=== Houston Astros (second stint) ===
On June 20, 2014, Veras signed a minor league contract with the Houston Astros He was called up to the major league squad on June 26. He pitched to a 3.03 ERA with 37 strikeouts in 32.2 innings. He became a free agent following the season.

=== Atlanta Braves ===
On February 10, 2015, Veras signed a minor league deal with the Atlanta Braves. Veras was released by the Braves on March 19, 2015.

=== Houston Astros (third stint) ===
On May 15, 2015, Veras signed a minor league deal to return to the Astros. After allowing 12 earned runs on 23 hits in 19 innings at Triple-A, he was released on July 30.

=== Bridgeport Bluefish ===
On June 20, 2016, Veras signed with the Bridgeport Bluefish of the Atlantic League of Professional Baseball. This marks the first time Veras has ever pitched in independent baseball. He became a free agent after the 2016 season. In 26 games 23.2 innings of relief he struggled going 2-2 with a 5.32 ERA with 25 strikeouts and 12 saves.

== Scouting report ==
He has a mid to high 90s mph 4-seam fastball and a mid 80s changeup. Both pitches generate an above average number of ground balls. Veras also throws a mid 70s curveball, which is his top swing and miss pitch. He throws with a low 3/4 arm motion.

== Personal life ==
Veras is married to Gissel Veras. They have a daughter, Gijen, and two sons, Genson and Hansel.
