= List of Washington Nationals owners and executives =

This is a list of Montreal Expos and Washington Nationals owners and executives.

(This Major League Baseball franchise played as the Montreal Expos from 1969 through 2004 and has played as the Washington Nationals since 2005.)

== Owners ==
=== Montreal Expos ===
Name	Years
Charles Bronfman	1969–1991
Claude Brochu	1991–1998
Jeffrey Loria	1998–2002
Expos Baseball, LP a subsidiary of Major League Baseball	2002–2004

=== Washington Nationals ===
Name	Years
Expos Baseball, LP	2004–2006
Ted Lerner	2006–2023
Mark Lerner	2023–present

=== Presidents ===
Name	Years
Stan Kasten	2006–2010
Mike Rizzo	2013–2025
Paul Toboni	2025-present

== General managers ==
=== Montreal Expos ===
Name	Years
Jim Fanning	1969–1976
Charlie Fox	1976–1978
John McHale	1978–1984
Murray Cook	1984–1987
Bill Stoneman	1987–1988
Dave Dombrowski	1988–1991
Dan Duquette	1991–1994
Kevin Malone	1994–1995
Jim Beattie	1995–2001
Larry Beinfest	2001-2002
Omar Minaya	2002–2004

=== Washington Nationals ===
Name	Years
Jim Bowden	2005–2009
Mike Rizzo	2009–2025

== Other executives ==
=== Montreal Expos ===
Name	Years
Chris Antonetti	1998
Bing Devine	1978– ?
Mel Didier	1970–1975
Jim Fanning	1968–1981; 1982–1984; 1984– ?
Neal Huntington	1995–1997
Bobby Winkles	Late 1970s–Early 1980s

=== Washington Nationals ===
Name	Years
Bob Boone	? -present
José Cardenal	2005–2009
Chuck LaMar	2007
Barry Larkin	2005–2008
Moose Stubing	2008–2018
