= Fredi González =

Cuban-American baseball manager (born 1964)

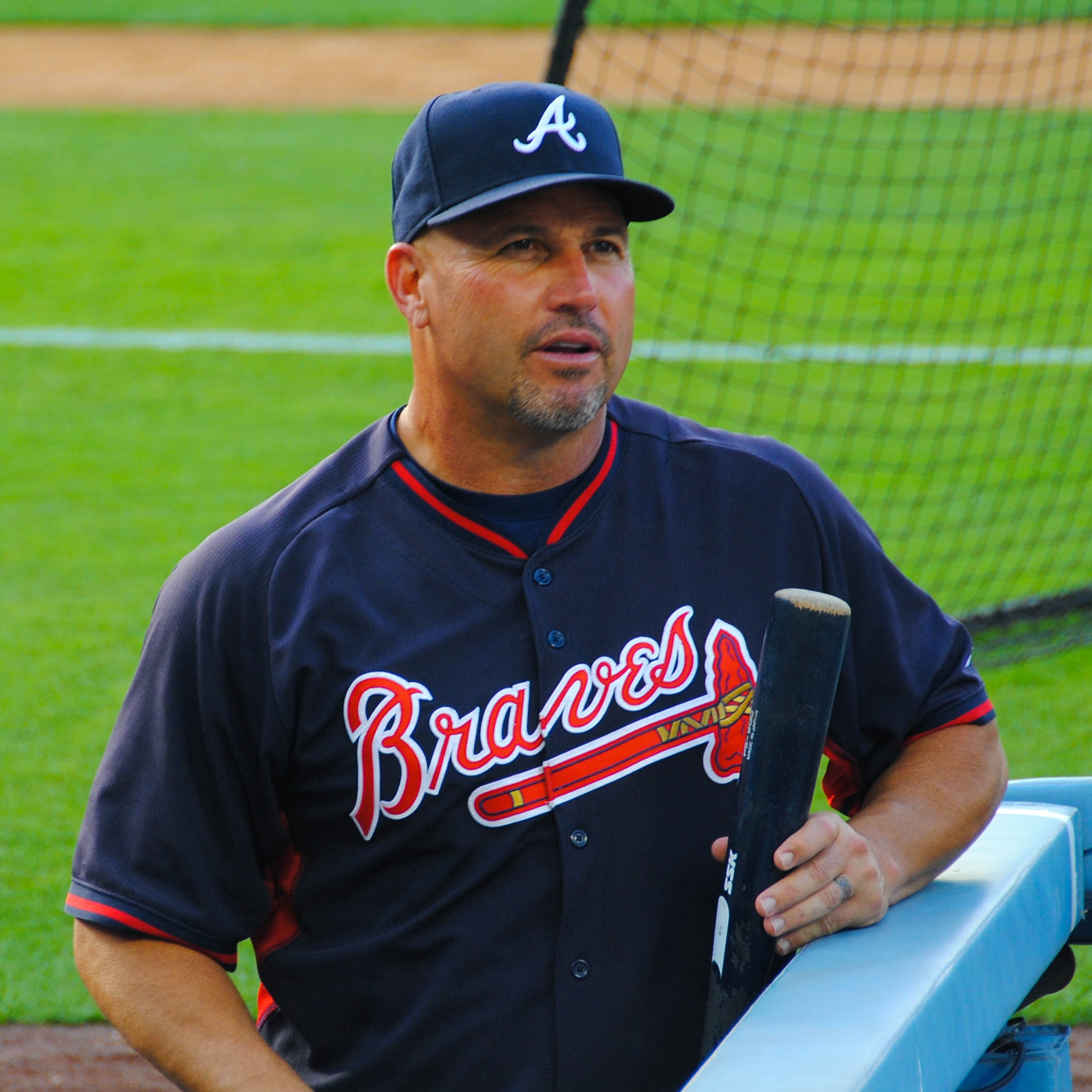
- González with the Atlanta Braves
- Coach
- Born: January 28, 1964 (age 62); Holguín, Cuba
- Bats: Right Throws: Right

MLB statistics
- Games managed: 1,402
- Win–loss record: 710–692
- Winning %: .506
- Stats at Baseball Reference
- Managerial record at Baseball Reference

Teams
- As manager: Florida Marlins (2007–2010); Atlanta Braves (2011–2016); As coach: Florida Marlins (1999–2001); Atlanta Braves (2003–2006); Miami Marlins (2017–2019); Baltimore Orioles (2020–2024); Atlanta Braves (2025)

Fredi Jesús González (born January 28, 1964) is a Cuban-born American professional baseball coach and manager. He managed the Florida Marlins from 2007 to 2010 and the Atlanta Braves from 2011 to 2016. González was fired from both managing positions. For four seasons prior to 2007, he was the third base coach for the Braves. Despite never reaching the playoffs with Florida, González nearly led the Braves to a playoff berth in his first season as manager in 2011. He then guided the Braves to the postseason in 2012 and 2013.

== Biography ==
Gonzalez was born in Holguín, Cuba to Fredi and Caridad González. He grew up in Miami, Florida, where he attended Southridge High School. He was signed by the New York Yankees after being their 16th selection in the 1982 amateur draft. He spent six years as a catcher in the Yankees farm system, though never advancing above the Double–A level. After two years as a graduate assistant coach for the University of Tennessee Volunteers he began his managerial career in 1990, taking over the Miami Miracle of the Florida State League.

González continued with the Miracle into 1991 until he joined the Florida Marlins organization in 1992. He was chosen to be the first coach to instruct the first Marlins prospects of the franchise assigned to the Erie Sailors minor league team. González coached throughout the Marlins organization, including a 1997 stop as manager of the Portland Sea Dogs, the Double–A Eastern League affiliate of the Marlins; he managed the Sea Dogs to a first-place finish in the Eastern League's Northern Division, with a record of 79–63. He moved to the big league club in 1999 as third base coach for the 1999 and 2000 seasons.

After leaving the Marlins, González spent 2002 with the Braves' Triple–A affiliate, the Richmond Braves, and moved up to the major league club early in the 2003 season. On October 3, 2006, González was named the manager of the Florida Marlins within hours of Joe Girardi being fired. González was named as a coach for the 2007 NL All-Star Team, replacing Willie Randolph who was undergoing shoulder surgery. After the 2008 season, Gonzalez was named the Sporting News Manager of the Year.

After a victory against the St. Louis Cardinals in 2010, González had won more games than any other manager in Marlins history. On June 23, 2010, González was fired as Marlins manager. González led the Marlins to winning seasons in 2008 and 2009, despite working with the lowest payroll in the Major Leagues. The Marlins decided to replace González with Edwin Rodriguez as the interim manager.

On October 13, 2010, González was officially named the new manager for the Atlanta Braves, succeeding the retiring Bobby Cox. In his first season managing the team, he led the Braves to an 8 1/2-game lead in the National League Wild Card race on August 26, only to suffer a historic collapse and lose the spot to the eventual World Series champion St. Louis Cardinals on the final day. González was criticized for overworking his bullpen during September.

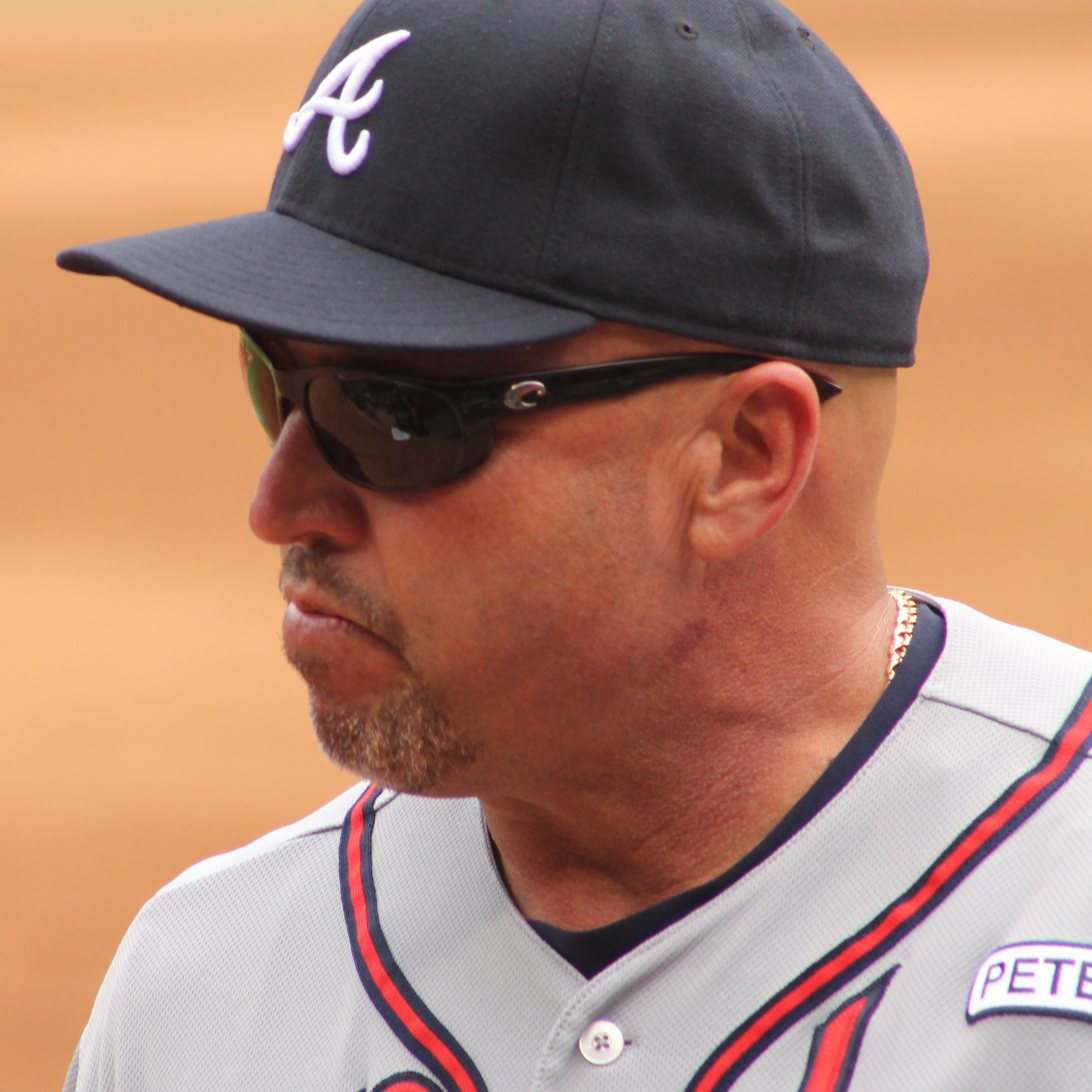
González in 2014

González was able to rebound Atlanta the following season, finishing with a 94–68 record and a wild card berth. On October 5, 2012, González managed his first postseason game as a Major League manager. It was a 6–3 loss to the St. Louis Cardinals in the 2012 National League Wild Card Game at Turner Field. González put this game under protest after the infield fly rule was called by umpire Sam Holbrook on a ball that fell in shallow left field in the bottom of the eighth inning. González earned his first major league postseason win on October 4, 2013, in a 4–3 win over the Los Angeles Dodgers at Turner Field in Game 2 of the National League Division Series.

After a 9–28 start in 2016, González was fired by the Braves on May 17, 2016.

On November 7, 2016, the Miami Marlins hired González as their third base coach. González did not return to the Marlins for the 2020 season.

On December 5, 2019, it was reported that González would join the Baltimore Orioles as a major league coach; this was confirmed by the Orioles on December 23. On October 11, 2024, the Orioles announced that González would not return for the 2025 season.

During the spring of 2025, González was a volunteer coach at Ursinus College, and an umpire evaluator for Major League Baseball.

On June 2, 2025, González was hired by the Atlanta Braves to serve as the team's third base coach, replacing Matt Tuiasosopo. On November 5, it was reported that González would not return to the team for the 2026 season.

== Managerial record ==
As of May 16, 2016

Team	From	To	Regular season record			Post–season record		
Team	From	To	W	L	Win %	W	L	Win %
Florida Marlins	2007	2010	276	279	.497	—		
Atlanta Braves	2011	2016	434	413	.512	1	4	.200
Total			710	692	.506	1	4	.200

== Personal life ==
Shortly after leaving the Braves, González moved to Malvern, Pennsylvania, to be with his fiancée. He is now married to Patrica. González has two children from a previous marriage with Pamela Miller, Gabrielle and Alex.

Sporting positions
Preceded by Mike Easler	Miami Miracle Manager; 1990–1991	Succeeded by last manager
Preceded by Barry Moss	Erie Sailors Manager; 1992	Succeeded by Doug Sisson
Preceded by Bryan Little	High Desert Mavericks Manager; 1993	Succeeded by Phil Hannon
Preceded by first manager	Brevard County Manatees Manager; 1994–1996	Succeeded by Lorenzo Bundy
Preceded by Carlos Tosca	Portland Sea Dogs Manager; 1997	Succeeded by Lynn Jones
Preceded by Carlos Tosca	Charlotte Knights Manager; 1998	Succeeded by Tom Spencer
Preceded by Rich Donnelly	Florida Marlins Third Base Coach; 1999–2001	Succeeded by Ozzie Guillén
Preceded by Carlos Tosca	Richmond Braves Manager; 2002	Succeeded by Pat Kelly
Preceded by Ned Yost	Atlanta Braves Third Base Coach; 2003–2006	Succeeded by Brian Snitker
Preceded by Lenny Harris	Miami Marlins Third Base Coach; 2017–2019	Succeeded by Trey Hillman
Preceded by Matt Tuiasosopo	Atlanta Braves Third Base Coach; 2025	Succeeded by Tommy Watkins
