= Brett Sinkbeil =

American baseball player (born 1984)

- Pitcher
- Born: December 26, 1984 (age 41); Tulsa, Oklahoma, U.S.
- Batted: Right Threw: Right

MLB debut
- September 15, 2010, for the Florida Marlins

Last MLB appearance
- September 26, 2010, for the Florida Marlins

MLB statistics
- Win–loss record: 0–0
- Earned run average: 13.50
- Strikeouts: 1
- Stats at Baseball Reference

Teams
- Florida Marlins (2010)

Brett Sinkbeil (born December 26, 1984) is an American former professional baseball pitcher. He played in Major League Baseball (MLB) for the Florida Marlins.

== Baseball career ==
=== Amateur ===
Sinkbeil was drafted by the St. Louis Cardinals in the 38th round of the 2003 Major League Baseball draft out of Charles Page High School, but he chose not to sign. He attended Missouri State University, and in 2005 he played collegiate summer baseball with the Falmouth Commodores of the Cape Cod Baseball League where he was named a league all-star. He was drafted by the Florida Marlins in the first round of the 2006 Major League Baseball draft and signed June 16, 2006.

=== Florida Marlins ===
Sinkbeil was drafted by the Florida Marlins in the first round of the 2006 Major League Baseball draft out of Missouri State University. Sinkbeil was named the #77 prospect in baseball by Baseball America before the 2007 season. On July 16, 2007, while pitching for the Jupiter Hammerheads, Sinkbeil was named Florida State League co-pitcher of the week, sharing the award with Phil Coke. Sinkbeil was named the #68 prospect in baseball by Baseball America before the 2008 season. The Marlins added Sinkbeil to the 40-man roster in November 2009 to protect him from the Rule 5 draft.

On September 15, 2010, Sinkbeil made his MLB debut for the Florida Marlins against the Philadelphia Phillies. He faced only one batter, getting Roy Halladay to ground out. In three appearances for Florida during his rookie campaign, Sinkbeil struggled to a 13.50 ERA with one strikeout over two innings of work. On November 24, Sinkbeil was removed from the 40-man roster and sent outright to the Triple-A New Orleans Zephyrs. Sinkbeil was released by the Marlins at the end of the team's 2011 Spring Training camp.

=== Pittsburgh Pirates ===
On April 20, 2011, Sinkbeil signed a minor league contract with the Pittsburgh Pirates. In 2011, he played for the High-A Bradenton Marauders and Double-A Altoona Curve. Sinkbeil was granted free agency after the 2011 season.
