= José Ceda =

Dominican baseball player (born 1987)

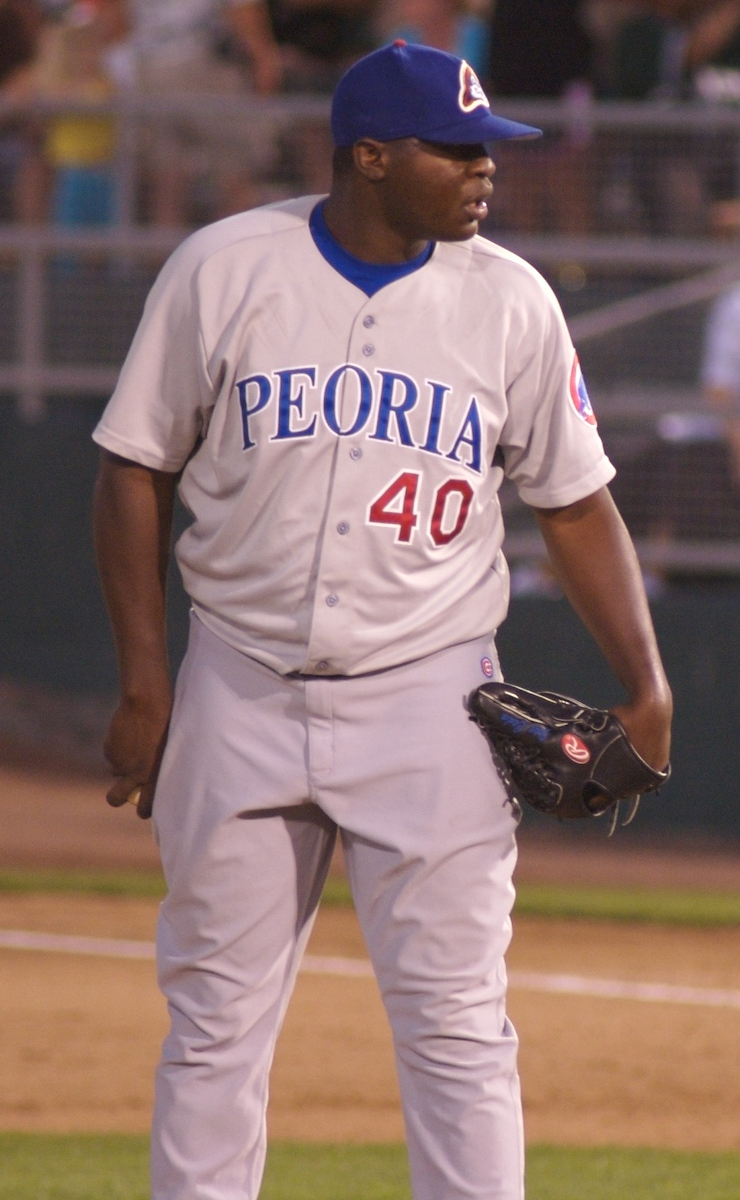
- Ceda with the Peoria Chiefs in 2007
- Pitcher
- Born: January 28, 1987 (age 39); Santo Domingo, Dominican Republic
- Batted: Right Threw: Right

MLB debut
- September 6, 2010, for the Florida Marlins

Last appearance
- September 24, 2011, for the Florida Marlins

MLB statistics
- Win–loss record: 0–1
- Earned run average: 4.66
- Strikeouts: 30
- Stats at Baseball Reference

Teams
- Florida Marlins (2010–2011)

José Marti Ceda Marte (born January 28, 1987) is a Dominican former professional baseball pitcher. He played in Major League Baseball (MLB) from 2010 to 2011 for the Florida Marlins.

== Professional career ==
=== San Diego Padres ===
On November 1, 2004, Ceda signed with the San Diego Padres as an international free agent. In 2005, Ceda, a right-handed pitcher, had a record of 4 wins and 2 losses in 13 games for the Dominican Summer League Padres, while posting a 1.50 ERA with 31 strikeouts. In 2006, he pitched in 8 games for the rookie-level Arizona League Padres, posting a 2–0 record and 5.09 ERA with 31 strikeouts over 23 innings of work.

=== Chicago Cubs ===
On July 31, 2006, Ceda was traded to the Chicago Cubs in exchange for Todd Walker. He spent the remainder of the season with the rookie-level Arizona League Cubs and High-A Boise Hawks.

Ceda spent the 2007 season with the Single-A Peoria Chiefs and AZL Cubs. In 23 appearances (7 starts) split between the two affiliates, he posted a cumulative 2–2 record and 3.06 ERA with 69 strikeouts across 50 innings pitched.

=== Florida / Miami Marlins ===
On November 13, 2008, Ceda was traded by the Cubs to the Florida Marlins in exchange for Kevin Gregg. He missed the entirety of the 2009 season due to a right shoulder injury. On November 20, 2009, the Marlins added Ceda to their 40-man roster to protect him from the Rule 5 draft.

On September 6, 2010, Ceda was promoted to the major leagues for the first time. In 8 games for the Marlins during his rookie campaign, he posted a 5.19 ERA with 9 strikeouts across 8 2/3 innings pitched.

On August 14, 2011, Ceda gained some infamy by walking relief pitcher Santiago Casilla on four pitches when Casilla was standing at the outermost point of the batter's box, clearly not intending to swing at any pitches. In 2011, Ceda made 17 appearances out of the bullpen for Miami, registering a 4.43 ERA with 21 strikeouts across 20 1/3 innings pitched.

On April 14, 2012, Ceda underwent Tommy John surgery and spent the rest of the 2012 season on the disabled list. Ceda spent 2013 in rehabilitation with the rookie-level Gulf Coast League Marlins and High-A Jupiter Hammerheads, struggling to a combined 11.25 ERA with 6 strikeouts over 5 appearances. On October 4, 2013, Ceda was removed from the 40-man roster and sent outright to the Triple-A New Orleans Zephyrs. He elected free agency following the season on November 4.
