= Christine Essel =

American business executive

- Education: Chatsworth High School; Cal State Northridge; Redlands University (BSBA)
- Occupation: President of Southern California Grantmakers
- Website: https://www.essel09.com

Christine "Chris" Essel is the President of Southern California Grantmakers, a regional association of philanthropic leaders whose mission is to support and advance effective, responsible philanthropy for the public good.

Essel was previously the chief executive officer of the Community Redevelopment Agency, Los Angeles and the former Senior Vice President at Paramount Pictures leading the planning and development as well as government and community relations departments. She was a candidate in the December 8, 2009 general election for Los Angeles City Council District 2.

== Education ==
A long-time San Fernando Valley resident, she is a graduate of Valley public schools including Shirley Ave. Elementary, Sutter Jr. High, and Chatsworth High School. Essel attended Cal State Northridge and finished her education with a Bachelor of Science in Business Administration degree from Redlands University.

== Career ==
=== Los Angeles municipal appointments ===
She served California and the City of Los Angeles as an appointed commissioner on numerous boards; currently, she is the Vice Chair of the California Workforce Investment Board and from 1999 to 2007, she was chair of the California Film Commission where she is still a board member.

In 1992, she was appointed to the Community Redevelopment Agency (CRA) board by Los Angeles Mayor Tom Bradley and was reappointed by the succeeding mayor, Richard Riordan. After being elected commission chairwoman, she led the effort to turn around Hollywood Boulevard to make it a safe and attractive destination for tourists and L.A. residents. Essel also led efforts to develop what became the Agency’s stringent green building guidelines.

She also served on Tom Bradley's Hollywood Mobility Action Committees. Most recently, she served as a Los Angeles World Airports Commissioner, but resigned from the post to run for the Los Angeles City Council.

== Campaign for City Council ==
In June 2009, Essel announced her candidacy for the vacant 2nd District Los Angeles City Council seat, most recently held by Los Angeles City Controller Wendy Greuel. Essel's candidacy was endorsed by Greuel, former Los Angeles Mayor Richard Riordan, City Attorney Carmen Trutanich, State Senator Fran Pavley, the majority of the Los Angeles City Council as well as the 16 IATSE west coast studio locals, AFSCME DC 36, Los Angeles Fire Department Chief Officers Association and most of Southern California's building trades locals. Essel was also endorsed by the Los Angeles Times. She placed 2nd in the September 22, 2009 primary election (a field of 10 which included Los Angeles Unified School District board member Tamar Galatzan) to reach a December runoff election against then-Assemblyman Paul Krekorian. Krekorian won the election, which was bitterly contested.
