= Bryan Petersen =

American baseball player (born 1986)

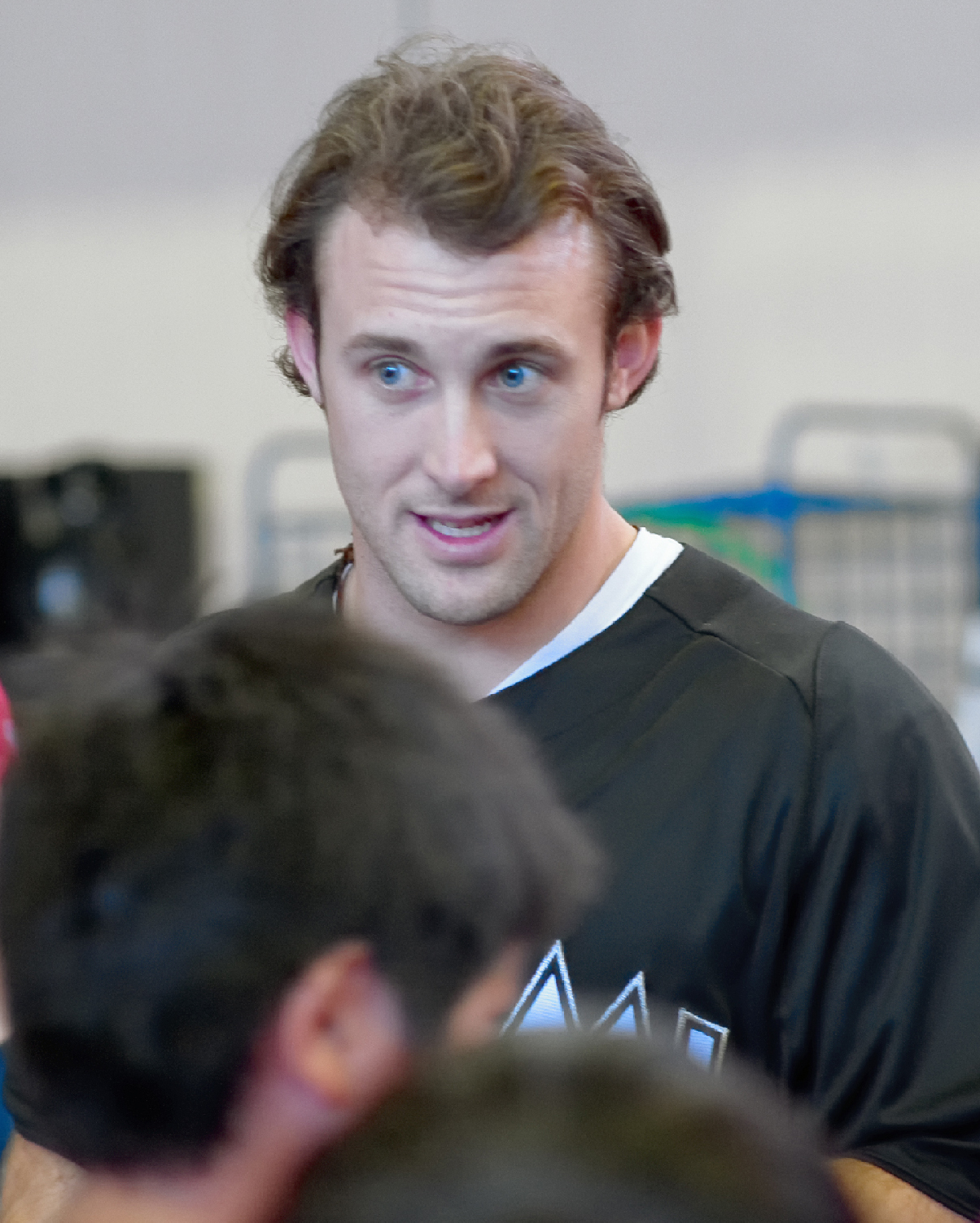
- Petersen with the Miami Marlins
- Outfielder
- Born: April 9, 1986 (age 40); Agoura, California, U.S.
- Batted: Left Threw: Right

MLB debut
- May 7, 2010, for the Florida Marlins

Last MLB appearance
- October 3, 2012, for the Miami Marlins

MLB statistics
- Batting average: .220
- Home runs: 2
- Runs batted in: 29
- Stats at Baseball Reference

Teams
- Florida / Miami Marlins (2010–2012)

Bryan Evan Petersen (born April 9, 1986) is an American former professional baseball outfielder. He played in Major League Baseball (MLB) for the Miami Marlins from 2010 to 2012.

== Early life ==
Petersen was born in Agoura, California and graduated from Chatsworth High School in Chatsworth, California. He played college baseball at the University of California, Irvine.

== Professional career ==
=== Florida/Miami Marlins ===
Petersen was drafted by the Florida Marlins in the seventh round of the 2007 Major League Baseball draft out of the University of California, Irvine.

Petersen was called up to the majors for the first time on May 6, 2010. He hit a single in his first career at bat and eventually scored a run.

On July 20, 2011, Peterson pitched a hitless inning of relief, walking one batter, in a game against the San Diego Padres. On September 27, when Javier Vázquez made his last Major League start, Petersen gave him a win when he hit a ninth inning walk-off home run off Nationals reliever Doug Slaten off the Bud Light advertisement in right field. It ended up being the final home run hit by a Marlins’ player in the organization’s first home, then known as Sun Life Stadium.

On April 29, 2012, Petersen was recalled from Triple-A New Orleans to replace struggling outfielder Chris Coghlan, who was optioned to New Orleans. Petersen was hitting .320 with 8 runs batted in and 3 SB in 21 games at New Orleans. He finished the season batting .195 in 241 at-bats with no homers, 9 doubles, 3 triples, 17 runs batted in, 25 walks, and 8 stolen bases.

After the signing of reliever Jon Rauch to a one-year deal, Petersen was designated for assignment by the team. He cleared waivers and was sent outright to Triple-A New Orleans on February 8, 2013. In 2013, he hit .275, with 33 doubles, 5 triples, 8 home runs, and 49 runs batted in while stealing 12 bases with the Zephyrs.

=== Texas Rangers ===
Petersen signed a minor league contract with the Texas Rangers on December 5, 2013. He was assigned to the Rangers' Triple-A affiliate, the Round Rock Express. On 3 April 2014, Petersen hit a grand slam in a 7-6 loss to the Oklahoma City RedHawks. So far, in the 2014 season, he has hit .254, with 12 homers, 57 runs batted in, and 5 stolen bases to go with a .323 on base percentage.

=== Milwaukee Brewers ===
On December 16, 2014, Petersen signed a minor league contract with the Milwaukee Brewers. He made 47 appearances for the Triple-A Colorado Springs Sky Sox in 2015, batting .218/.260/.294 with one home run and 13 RBI. Petersen was released by the Brewers organization on August 1, 2015.
