= Brad Davis (baseball) =

American baseball player (born 1982)

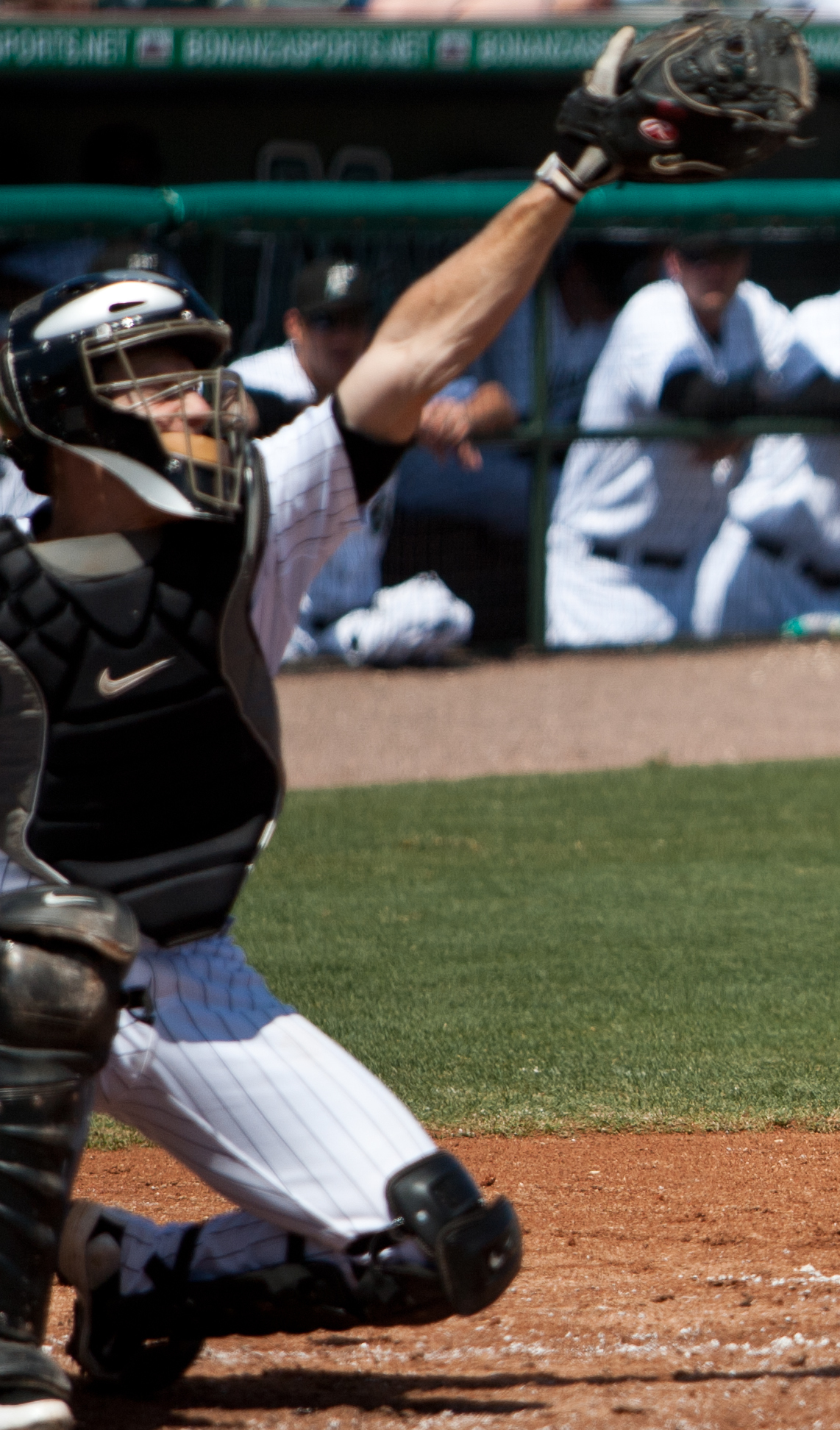
- Davis with the Florida Marlins during spring training in 2011
- Catcher
- Born: December 29, 1982 (age 43); San Diego, California, U.S.
- Batted: Right Threw: Right

MLB debut
- July 21, 2010, for the Florida Marlins

Last appearance
- October 3, 2010, for the Florida Marlins

MLB statistics
- Batting average: .211
- Home runs: 3
- Runs batted in: 16
- Stats at Baseball Reference

Teams
- Florida Marlins (2010)

Bradley Edward Davis (born December 29, 1982) is an American former professional baseball catcher who played in Major League Baseball for the Florida Marlins in 2010.

== Early life ==
Davis graduated from Capistrano Valley High School in Mission Viejo, California in 2001, where he was named CIF Player of the Year as a senior. He attended Long Beach State University, where he majored in Communications, and was also named as a Freshman All-American. In 2002, he played collegiate summer baseball with the Brewster Whitecaps of the Cape Cod Baseball League.

== Professional career ==
=== Florida Marlins ===
Davis was drafted by the Marlins in the fifth round of the 2004 Major League Baseball draft. Davis spent all of 2006 with the Class-A Advanced Jupiter Hammerheads, hitting .259 with four home runs and 46 RBI in 106 games. He was named to the Florida State League All-Star Game. He had seven three-hit games and seven three-RBI games, including four games with three hits and three RBI. August was his best month was August, as he hit .302 with a home run and 12 RBI in 21 games.

On July 21, 2010, the Marlins promoted Davis to the major leagues after designating pitcher Nate Robertson for assignment. He was optioned back to Triple-A on August 5, but he was recalled on August 20 after Ronny Paulino was suspended for the use of performance-enhancing drugs. Davis was the team's regular starting catcher for the final month of the 2010 season. He hit the first-ever grand slam by a Marlins catcher on September 20, driving in the only runs in a 4–0 win.

Davis was designated for assignment on June 15, 2011.

=== San Diego Padres ===
Davis signed a minor league contract with the San Diego Padres in 2012 but was released by the end of June after playing 39 games with the Triple-A Tucson Padres.

=== Miami Marlins (second stint) ===
On July 5, 2012, Davis signed a minor league contract with the Miami Marlins and played in 7 games for the Triple-A New Orleans Zephyrs.

=== Detroit Tigers ===
On July 26, 2012, the Marlins traded Davis to the Detroit Tigers for future considerations. He played in 15 games for the Triple-A Toledo Mud Hens. Davis played in 41 games for Toledo in 2013 before retiring on August 13.
