= Adalberto Méndez =

Dominican baseball player (born 1982)

- Pitcher
- Born: February 22, 1982 (age 44); Santo Domingo, Dominican Republic
- Batted: Right Threw: Right

MLB debut
- September 6, 2010, for the Florida Marlins

Last MLB appearance
- October 1, 2010, for the Florida Marlins

MLB statistics
- Win–loss record: 1–3
- Earned run average: 5.11
- Strikeouts: 7
- Stats at Baseball Reference

Teams
- Florida Marlins (2010)

Adalberto Méndez (born February 22, 1982) is a Dominican former professional baseball pitcher. He played in Major League Baseball (MLB) for the Florida Marlins in 2010.

== Career ==
=== Florida Marlins ===
Méndez was chosen by the Florida Marlins from the Chicago Cubs in the minor league phase of the 2007 Rule 5 draft. He was called up to the major leagues for the first time on September 4, 2010. Méndez became a free agent after the 2011 season.

=== Guerreros de Oaxaca ===
On June 9, 2012, Méndez signed with the Guerreros de Oaxaca of the Mexican League. In 11 appearances (eight starts) for Oaxaca, he logged a 2–3 record and 4.36 ERA with 30 strikeouts across 43 1/3 innings pitched. Méndez was released by the Guerreros on July 26.

=== Piratas de Campeche ===
On May 18, 2013, Méndez signed with the Piratas de Campeche of the Mexican League. In four outings for Campeche, he recorded a 2.70 ERA with two strikeouts over 3 1/3 innings of work. Méndez was released by the Piratas on May 23.

=== Vaqueros Laguna ===
On May 31, 2013, Méndez signed with the Vaqueros Laguna of the Mexican League. In 19 appearances for the Vaqueros, he compiled a 3–3 record and 4.76 ERA with 30 strikeouts and three saves across 58 2/3 innings pitched. Méndez became a free agent after the season.

== See also ==
- Rule 5 draft results
