= Michael Hill (baseball) =

Baseball executive

- Born: March 25, 1971 (age 55); Cincinnati, Ohio, U.S.
- Occupation: Sports executive
- Years active: 1995–present
- Employer: Major League Baseball
- Known for: Executive positions with the Miami Marlins

Michael L. Hill (born March 25, 1971) is an American professional baseball executive and former Minor League Baseball player, currently serving as senior vice president of on-field operations for Major League Baseball (MLB). He previously worked in the front-office of the Miami Marlins, including roles as general manager and president of baseball operations.

== Early life and career ==
Hill was born to an African-American father and a Cuban mother. His maternal grandfather worked for Procter & Gamble in Havana and was sponsored to relocate to the company's Cincinnati headquarters. Hill has stated he was "pretty much raised African-American" as his family wished to acclimate to American culture upon immigrating. Hill originally attended Withrow High School where he played on their football team before being offered the opportunity to attend Cincinnati Country Day School. He played football, baseball, and basketball at Cincinnati Country Day School during his senior year.

A 1993 graduate of Harvard University, Hill was elected senior class marshal while starring as the Crimson football team's top rusher and the baseball team's captain. Following Harvard, he was drafted in 1993 by the Texas Rangers in the 31st round. He made his minor-league debut in 1993 with Class A Short-Season Erie and remained with the club when it relocated to Hudson Valley in 1994. He played two seasons in the Rangers system and one year in the Reds organization before joining the Tampa Bay Devil Rays front office in 1995.

== Major League Baseball ==
In 1999, Baseball America named Hill as one of 10 people in baseball whose prominence will increase significantly in the first decade of the new century. It quoted strong sources who said he would turn into a successful general manager before the 2010 season. That year, he began working for the Colorado Rockies, serving as their director of player development until leaving to join the front office of the Florida Marlins (later renamed the Miami Marlins).

Hill was a part of the Marlins organization for over a decade, having joined their front office in 2002. At the age of 32, Hill was named to the "Hot List" by the Black Enterprise magazine in their December 2003 issue, a list that represents the best and brightest African American executives under the age of 40.

Over time, Hill has served positions such as vice president, assistant general manager, and general manager. Hill worked closely with then-president of baseball operations Larry Beinfest, focusing on roster management, payroll and contract research and negotiation, and waiver and rule compliance.

Hill signed an extension through the 2015 season on September 29, 2007, and was promoted to president of baseball operations of the Miami Marlins in September 2013. In 2021, Hill was named a co-Senior Vice President of On-Field Operations for MLB.

== Personal life ==
Hill has 3 sons. In January, 2008, Hill completed his first marathon, finishing the Miami Marathon. He continued to compete in marathons and averaged 50 miles a week while training for the World Marathon Challenge.
