= Edwin Rodríguez (baseball) =

Puerto Rican baseball player and manager (born 1960)

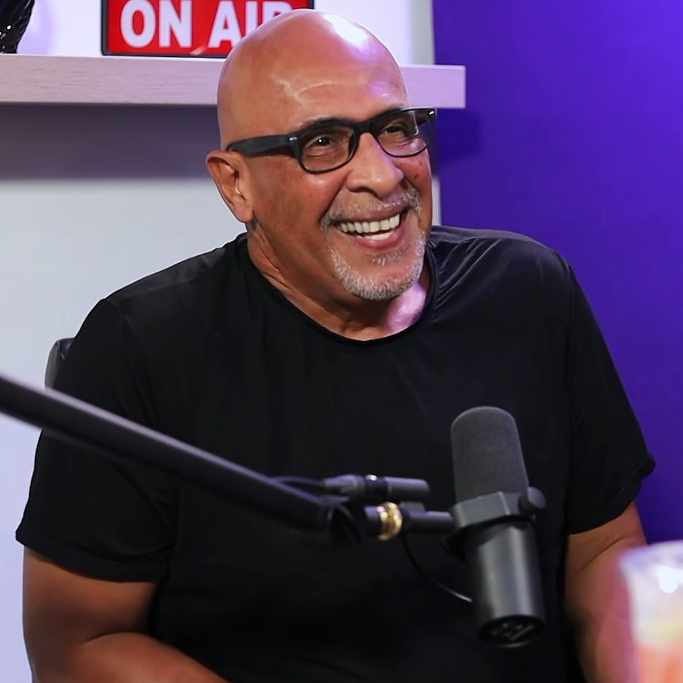
- Rodríguez in 2025
- Manager / Infielder
- Born: August 14, 1960 (age 65); Ponce, Puerto Rico
- Batted: Right Threw: Right

MLB debut
- September 28, 1982, for the New York Yankees

Last MLB appearance
- April 30, 1985, for the San Diego Padres

MLB statistics
- Batting average: .227
- Runs: 3
- Hits: 5
- Games managed: 163
- Win–loss record: 78–85
- Winning %: .479
- Stats at Baseball Reference
- Managerial record at Baseball Reference

Teams
- As player: New York Yankees (1982); San Diego Padres (1983, 1985); As manager: Florida Marlins (2010–2011)
Medals
Men's baseball
Manager for Puerto Rico
World Baseball Classic
| Silver medal – second place | 2013 San Francisco | Team |
| Silver medal – second place | 2017 Los Angeles | Team |

Edwin Rodríguez Morales (born August 14, 1960) is a Puerto Rican former professional baseball infielder and manager. He managed the Florida Marlins of Major League Baseball (MLB) from 2010 to 2011. He also played in the major leagues briefly in the early 1980s for the New York Yankees and San Diego Padres.

== Playing career ==
Rodríguez was signed as an amateur free agent by the Yankees in 1980. He played his first professional season with their Rookie league Gulf Coast Yankees 1980. He played three seasons for the New York Yankees and San Diego Padres. In 1983 he played his first season at the Triple-A level, with the Columbus Clippers team, an affiliate of the New York Yankees. That same year he was traded to the San Diego Padres, making his National League debut in 1983. With the Padres he played 4 more seasons. Mostly at the Triple-A level, although in 1985 he returned to play with the Padres in the majors. His last season as a player was with the Triple-A affiliate of the Padres (Las Vegas Stars) and Minnesota Twins (Portland Beavers) in 1987.

== Post-playing career ==
The same year that his playing career was over (1989 in the Puerto Rican Winter League) he became a full-time scout for the Minnesota Twins. He scouted for the Twins from 1989 to 1996. While working as a Scout he earned his BBA (1993) at the Pontifical Catholic University of Puerto Rico with an Accounting degree.

In 1997 he began his career as a Scout and Manager in the minor leagues simultaneously with the new Tampa Bay Rays franchise. In 1999 he won the championship as a manager with the Hudson Valley Renegades. He was manager of the Princeton Devil Rays of the Class A (Short-Season) Appalachian League from 2000 to 2002. He was with Tampa Bay until 2002.

In 2004 he started with the Florida Marlins. Rodríguez spent two seasons (2007–08) as the manager of the Class A Greensboro Grasshoppers in the South Atlantic League. He had a 66–72 record with the Hoppers in 2008 and was 71–69 in 2007. He previously spent two seasons as manager of the Florida Marlins' Gulf Coast League affiliate from 2005 to 2006 and served as hitting coach for the Double-A Carolina Mudcats in 2004. Rodriguez was named the manager of the Triple-A New Orleans Zephyrs on December 30, 2008, becoming the 11th manager in the team's history.

On June 23, 2010, Rodríguez became the interim manager for the Florida Marlins replacing Fredi González and won his first game against the Baltimore Orioles on the same day. On June 29, before a Marlins game in San Juan, Puerto Rico, Marlins owner Jeffrey Loria announced that Rodríguez would remain as manager through the 2010 season. He resigned as manager on June 19, 2011.

On November 29, 2012, Rodríguez became the manager for the Double-A Akron Aeros. During 2013.

On January 27, 2017, Rodríguez became the manager for the Class A (Advanced) Lake Elsinore Storm.

Rodríguez currently serves as executive director of the Puerto Rico Baseball Academy and High School in Gurabo, Puerto Rico.

On January 9, 2023, Rodríguez was hired as the manager of the Acereros de Monclova of the Mexican League.

In 2026, Rodriguez was named as the hitting coach for the Dominican Summer League Red Sox Red the summer league affiliate of the Boston Red Sox.

== See also ==
- List of Major League Baseball players from Puerto Rico
