= General manager (baseball) =

Occupation on a baseball team

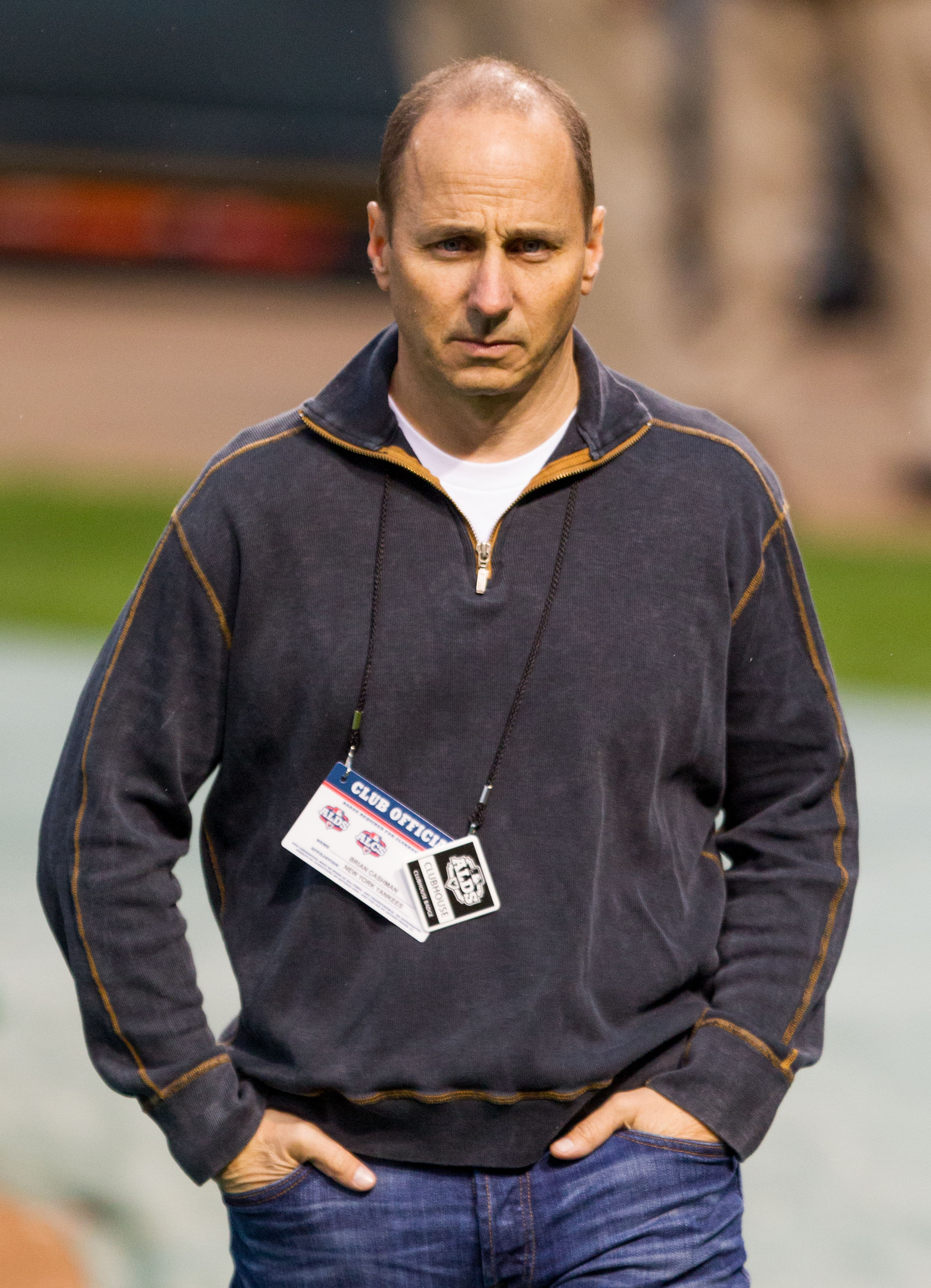
Brian Cashman has served as general manager of the New York Yankees since 1998.

In Major League Baseball, the general manager (GM) of a team typically controls player transactions and bears the primary responsibility on behalf of the ballclub during contract discussions with players.

== Roles and responsibilities ==
The general manager is normally the person who hires and fires the coaching staff, including the field manager who acts as the head coach. In baseball, the term manager used without qualification almost always refers to the field manager, not the general manager.

Before the 1960s, and in some rare cases since then, a person with the general manager title in sports has also borne responsibility for the non-player operations of the ballclub, such as ballpark administration and broadcasting. Ed Barrow, George Weiss and Gabe Paul were three baseball GMs noted for their administrative skills in both player and non-player duties.

== History and evolution ==
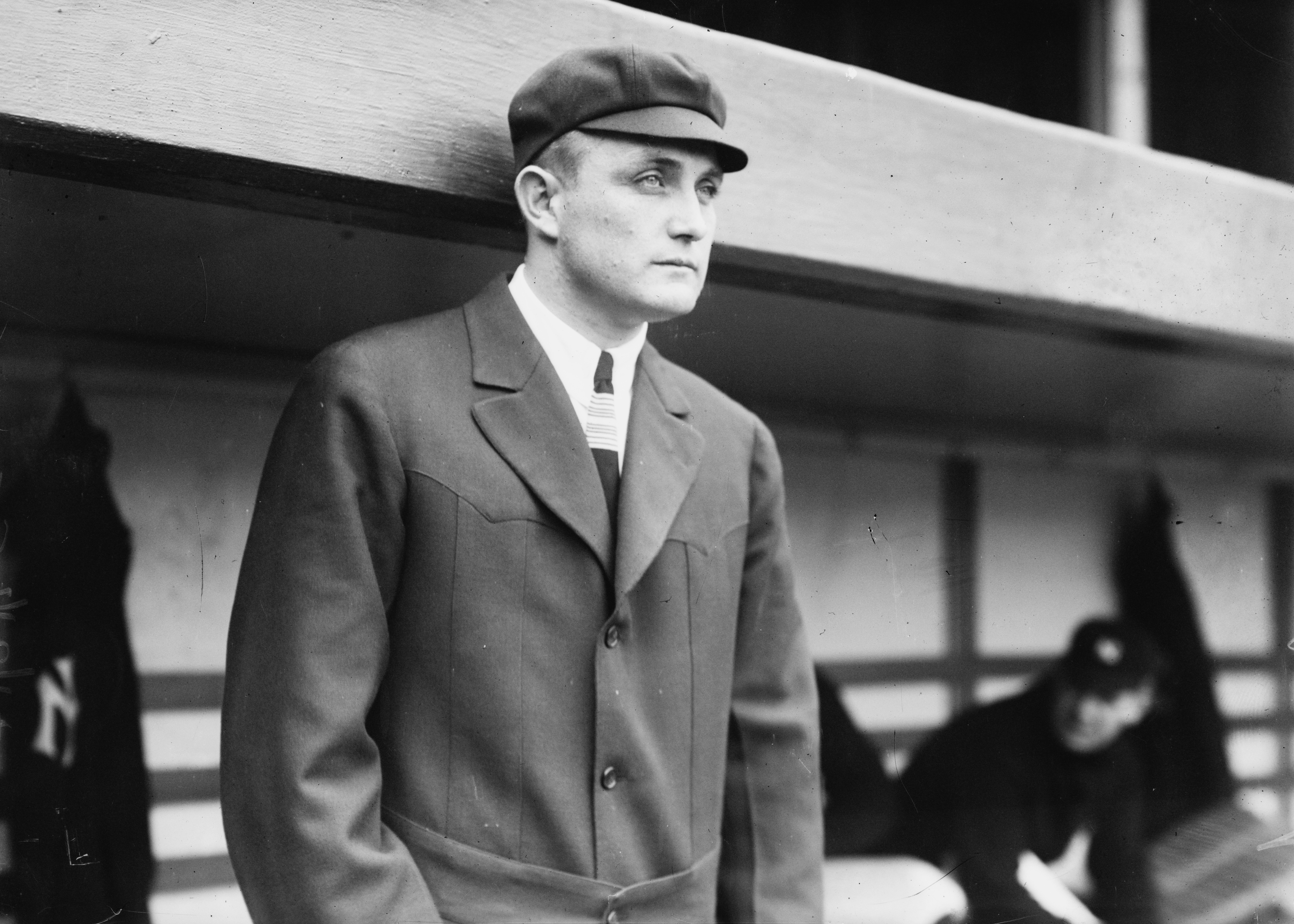
In 1927, former umpire Billy Evans became the first person to hold a general manager title with a major-league team, the Cleveland Indians.

In the first decades of baseball's post-1901 modern era, responsibilities for player acquisition fell upon the club owner and/or president and the field manager. In some cases, particularly in the early years of the American League, the owner was a former player or manager himself: Charles Comiskey of the Chicago White Sox, Connie Mack of the Philadelphia Athletics, and Clark Griffith of the Washington Senators are three prominent examples. Other owners tended to be magnates from the business world, although some, like Brooklyn Dodgers' president Charles Ebbets, worked their way from front-office jobs into ownership positions. Most deferred player personnel evaluations to their on-field managers. One notable exception, cited by Mark L. Armour and Daniel R. Leavitt in their book In Pursuit of Pennants, was German immigrant Barney Dreyfuss, owner of the Pittsburgh Pirates from 1900 to 1932. Dreyfuss had no playing background, but was one of the most astute judges of talent of his time. Under Dreyfuss, Pittsburgh won six National League pennants and two World Series titles (1909 and 1925). The New York Giants' John McGraw, who also held a minority ownership stake in the team, is an example of a powerful manager who, during his three decades at the Giants' helm, exerted control over off-field aspects of the team's operation. McGraw managed the Giants from 1902 to 1932, piloting them to ten National League pennants and three World Series titles (1905, 1921, and 1922) along the way.

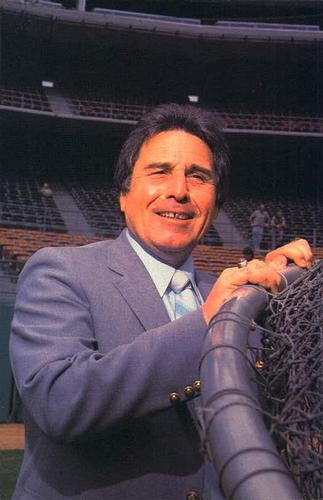
Jack McKeon served as both general manager and field manager of the San Diego Padres.

According to Baseball Almanac, the first man to hold the title of general manager was Billy Evans when he was appointed by the Cleveland Indians in 1927. However, the duties of the modern general manager already had been assumed by two executives — Barrow of the New York Yankees and Branch Rickey of the St. Louis Cardinals — whose formal title at the time was business manager. Both were former field managers of big-league teams, although Barrow had no professional playing background.

They assumed those positions (Barrow in 1920 and Rickey five years later) when clubs could legally control only 15 minor league players on option, and most young players were purchased or drafted from independently owned minor league teams. Rickey, creator of the modern and extensive farm system during the 1920s and 1930s, played a critical role in inventing the need for a general manager as well: with most teams coming to own or affiliate with multiple minor league teams from Class D to the top tier, and with dozens (and in some cases hundreds) of players under contract, they needed a front-office infrastructure to oversee the major league club, scouting and player procurement, minor league operations and player development, and business affairs. The general manager, in lieu of the "owner-operator", provided that oversight.

But both the owner-operator and the field-manager-as-GM models survived into the 1980s. Owners Charlie Finley of the Oakland Athletics and Calvin Griffith of the Minnesota Twins functioned as their own chiefs of baseball operations. During the 1970s and 1980s, Alvin Dark of the Indians, Billy Martin of the Athletics (after Finley sold them in August 1980), and Whitey Herzog of the Cardinals combined manager and general manager duties, while Paul Owens of the Philadelphia Phillies and Jack McKeon of the San Diego Padres were general managers who appointed themselves field managers and held both posts.

== Superior executive levels ==
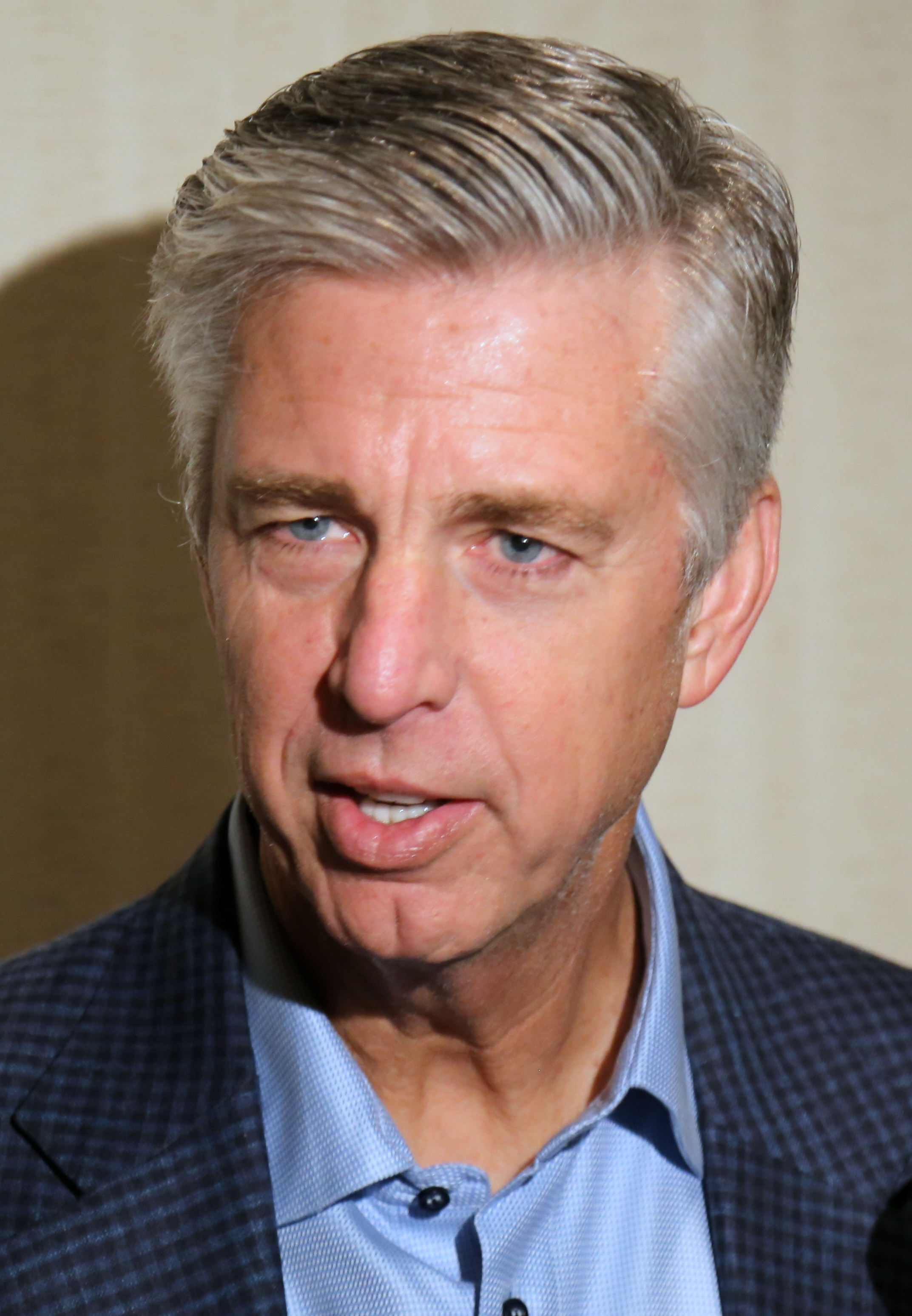
Dave Dombrowski has served as president of baseball operations for the Boston Red Sox and Philadelphia Phillies. As well as General Manager for the Detroit Tigers.

The early decades of the 21st century have seen Major League Baseball teams create a new layer of authority between ownership and the general manager, typically called the president of baseball operations (POBO). These executives may work in concert with others in the organization styled as presidents but having non-baseball-centric responsibilities, such as President/CEO or President/COO. The trend began in 2007, when, in June, Andy MacPhail was hired into a POBO role by the Baltimore Orioles. Then, in September, general manager Larry Beinfest was promoted to president of baseball operations by the Florida Marlins. In Beinfest's case, he was assisted by a newly appointed GM, Michael Hill.

Writing for Sports Business Daily in March 2015, legal academic and sports lawyer Glenn M. Wong observed: "No longer is it always true that the GM is the final decision-maker with respect to baseball decisions." One of the reasons for the creation of this new position was the soaring costs and revenues associated with modern MLB operations: "Ownership is often heavily involved in major investments and decisions ... Installing another layer creates a sort of checks-and-balances system and a checkpoint for the decision-making process."

In June 2015, another article by Wong revisited the topic and compared the evolving job descriptions and career trajectories of GMs and POBOs. In 2016, Sports Business Daily writer Eric Fisher cited the growing importance of data analytics in playing personnel evaluations and long-term planning (in addition to in game strategy), and heavier investments in player development, domestically and internationally, as contributing to the POBO movement and other structural changes in baseball front offices.

The Baseball America Annual Directory of 2019 listed 12 POBOs among the 30 MLB teams, as well as one "chief baseball officer" and four "executive vice presidents of baseball operations", operating above the GM level or also holding the GM title. In April 2024, a ranking by The Athletic of the top 10 front offices in MLB included seven teams with a president of baseball operations, and three without.

In some instances, a team may operate with a POBO or chief baseball officer and leave the GM role vacant. Two examples involve the Boston Red Sox: from 2017 through 2019, Dave Dombrowski served as POBO and the team had no GM; and in 2024, Craig Breslow was appointed as chief baseball officer and the team again had no GM. Breslow's title was changed to POBO during the 2026–27 offseason, with the team continuing to leave the GM role vacant.

== See also ==
- General manager § Sports teams
- Major League Baseball Executive of the Year Award
- Sporting News Executive of the Year Award
- Baseball America Major League Executive of the Year Award
