= James Houser =

American baseball player (born 1984)

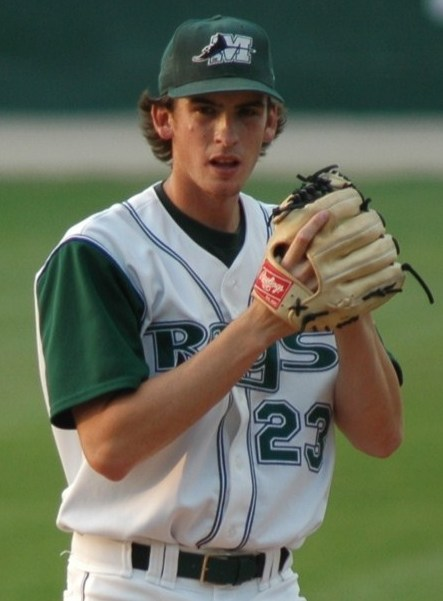
- Houser with the Southwest Michigan Devil Rays
- Pitcher
- Born: December 15, 1984 (age 41); Sarasota, Florida
- Batted: Left Threw: Left

MLB debut
- June 24, 2010, for the Florida Marlins

Last MLB appearance
- June 24, 2010, for the Florida Marlins

MLB statistics
- Win–loss record: 0–0
- Earned run average: 20.25
- Strikeouts: 1
- Stats at Baseball Reference

Teams
- Florida Marlins (2010)

James Robert Houser, Jr. (born December 15, 1984) is an American former professional baseball pitcher, who played in Major League Baseball (MLB) for the Florida Marlins in 2010.

== High school ==
Houser was an outstanding pitcher for Sarasota High School in Sarasota, Florida. During his senior year, he had an 11-1 record with a 1.40 ERA, striking out 118. He was named Florida's "Mr. Baseball" in 2003.

== Professional career ==
=== Tampa Bay Rays ===
Houser was drafted in the second round of the 2003 MLB draft by the then Tampa Bay Devil Rays. He began his career for the Princeton Devil Rays of the Appalachian League. In 2005, he was the pitcher of the year for the Southwest Michigan Devil Rays, and was also named to the Midwest League All-Star Game. The following year, he was again named pitcher of the year, this time for the Visalia Oaks of the California League.

He was released by the Rays on August 1, 2009, to make room for Jeff Bennett.

=== Florida Marlins ===
Before the 2010 season, Houser inked a minor-league contract with the Florida Marlins. He joined the Triple-A New Orleans Zephyrs on May 20. He was called up to the major league team in late June.

=== Baltimore Orioles ===
On February 1, 2011, Houser signed with the Baltimore Orioles on a minor league deal. Sat out season with season ending open heart surgery.

=== Independent Leagues ===
He played in the Atlantic League of Professional Baseball in 2012 and 2013 for the York Revolution, Camden Riversharks and Long Island Ducks.

In 2014, he signed with the Acereros de Monclova of the Mexican League.
