= Curse of the Billy Goat =

Superstition in American baseball

The Curse of the Billy Goat was a sports curse that was supposedly placed on the Chicago Cubs Major League Baseball (MLB) franchise in 1945, by Billy Goat Tavern owner William Sianis. The curse lasted 71 years, from 1945 to 2016. During Game 4 of the 1945 World Series at Wrigley Field, Sianis's pet goat, named Murphy, was bothering other fans, and so the pair were asked to leave the stadium. Outraged, Sianis allegedly declared, "Them Cubs, they ain't gonna win no more", which had been interpreted to mean that the Cubs would never win another National League (NL) pennant, at least for the remainder of Sianis's life.

The Cubs lost the 1945 World Series to the Detroit Tigers, and did not win a pennant or World Series championship again until 2016. The Cubs had last won the World Series in 1908. After the incident with Sianis and Murphy, the Cubs did not play in the World Series for the next 71 years until, on the 46th anniversary of William Sianis's death, the "curse" was broken when they defeated the Los Angeles Dodgers 5–0 in Game 6 of the 2016 National League Championship Series to win the NL pennant. The Cubs then defeated the American League (AL) champion Cleveland Indians 8–7 in 10 innings in Game 7 to win the World Series, 108 years after their last win.

== Origins of the curse ==
The exact nature of Sianis's curse differs in various accounts of the incident. Some state that he declared that no World Series games would ever again be played at Wrigley Field, while others believe that his ban was on the Cubs appearing in the World Series, making no mention of a specific venue. Sianis's family claims that he dispatched a telegram to team owner Philip K. Wrigley that read, “You are going to lose this World Series and you are never going to win another World Series again. You are never going to win a World Series again because you insulted my goat.”

Whatever the truth, the Cubs were up two games to one in the 1945 World Series, but ended up losing Game 4, as well as the best-of-seven series, four games to three. The curse was immortalized in newspaper columns over the years, particularly by syndicated columnist Mike Royko. The curse gained widespread attention during the 2003 postseason, when Fox television commentators played it up during the Cubs-Marlins matchup in the National League Championship Series (NLCS). According to an account in the Chicago Sun of October 7, 1945, the goat was turned away at the gate, and Sianis left the goat tied to a stake in a parking lot and went into the game alone. There was mention of a lawsuit, but no mention of a curse.

Between their 1908 triumph, which was the Cubs' second world championship (they'd also won the Series in 1907 to become baseball's first back-to-back winners as well as the first franchise to appear in three consecutive World Series), and 1945, the first year of the alleged Billy Goat Curse, the Cubs won the National League pennant six times but failed to win the Series: in 1910, in 1918 (won by the Boston Red Sox who themselves would soon become victims of an alleged baseball curse and not win another Series for 86 years), in 1929, in 1932 (known for Babe Ruth's called shot at Wrigley Field), in 1935 (a rematch of the 1908 series against the Detroit Tigers, with the Tigers winning this time, their first Series triumph in five appearances dating back to the early 1900s), and in 1938.

== Alleged curse incidents ==
In the years that followed the alleged curse, the following incidents have been attributed to it:

- On September 9, 1969, at Shea Stadium, the Cubs played the New York Mets in a critical pennant race game. A stray black cat walked between Cubs captain Ron Santo, who was on deck, and the Cubs dugout. The Mets pulled ahead of the Cubs in the series and eventually won both the newly formed NL East and the 1969 World Series.
- In 1984, the Cubs’ first postseason appearance since 1945 was dashed by the San Diego Padres in the National League Championship Series. The Cubs were victorious in the first two games of the best-of-five series. However, in Game Five, first baseman Leon Durham let a ground ball get past his allegedly wet glove in the bottom of the seventh inning. The Padres went on to score four runs to win the game and the series.
- Bill Buckner played for the Chicago Cubs for seven seasons before being traded to the Boston Red Sox halfway through the 1984 season. The Red Sox were at the time also considered a cursed franchise, and had not won a World Series since 1918 – when, coincidentally, they had beaten the Cubs. Buckner and the Red Sox advanced to the 1986 World Series against the New York Mets, and took a 3–2 series lead coming into Game 6. On October 25, 1986, in one of the most famous baseball errors of all time, Buckner allowed a ball to pass between his legs at first base, allowing the Mets to score the winning run in the 10th inning and win Game 6. Later analysis of a photograph of Buckner walking off the field after his blooper showed that he had been wearing a Cubs batting glove under his glove at the moment he committed his error.
- In 1989, the Cubs won 93 games and faced the San Francisco Giants in the NLCS, now a best-of-seven series. After splitting the first two games at home, the Cubs headed to the Bay Area, where despite holding a lead at some point in each of the next three games, bullpen meltdowns and managerial blunders ultimately led to three straight losses.
- In 1998, behind NL MVP Sammy Sosa, the Cubs won the Wild Card after winning a tiebreaker game versus the Giants. However, they were swept in the National League Division Series by the Atlanta Braves.
- In 2001, the Cubs led the wild card race by 2.5 games in early September, but a three-run walk-off homer by Preston Wilson halted the team's momentum. The team ended up finishing 88–74, five games behind both the Houston Astros and St. Louis Cardinals, who tied for first.
- In 2003, the Cubs won the NL Central and beat the Atlanta Braves in the NLDS for their first postseason win since 1908. Advancing to the NLCS to face the Florida Marlins, the Cubs held a three games to two lead in the best of seven series heading into Game 6. In the eighth inning of Game 6, with Chicago ahead 3–0, several spectators attempted to catch a foul ball off the bat of Marlins second baseman Luis Castillo. One of the fans, Steve Bartman, reached for the ball, deflecting it and disrupting a potential catch by Cubs outfielder Moisés Alou. If Alou had caught the ball, it would have been the second out in the inning and the Cubs would have been just four outs away from winning their first National League pennant since 1945. Instead, the Cubs ended up surrendering eight runs in the inning, in part due to an error by shortstop Alex Gonzalez on a potential double play ball two batters later, and losing the game, 8–3. When they were eliminated in the seventh game the next night, the incident was seen as the "first domino" in the turning point of the series.
- In 2004, the Cubs were picked by many media outlets as a favorite to win the World Series. However, the team struggled with injuries and inconsistent play for most of the year. Nevertheless, by late September, the Cubs were leading the Wild Card race by 1.5 games over the San Francisco Giants and the Houston Astros, but in their game on September 25, they collapsed in extra innings and they proceeded to drop six of the last eight games as the Astros won the Wild Card.
- The Cubs won their division in both 2007 and 2008, but were swept in the NLDS both years by the Arizona Diamondbacks and Los Angeles Dodgers respectively. Between the 1984 NLCS, the 1989 NLCS, the 2007 NLDS, the 2008 NLDS, the Cubs did not win a postseason game on the road in a West Coast city.
- In 2015, the Cubs finished second in the National League Wild Card race and defeated the Pittsburgh Pirates in the Wild Card Game and the St. Louis Cardinals in the NLDS to advance to the NLCS against the New York Mets. However, the Cubs posted an NLCS record low .164 batting average and lost the series in a four-game sweep without ever leading at any point. Sianis's goat was named Murphy. This was referenced by fans of the New York Mets, who joked that Daniel Murphy, the Mets second baseman and series MVP, was "not the first GOAT (Greatest of All Time, in reference to Murphy's postseason heroics to that point) named Murphy to keep the Cubs out of the World Series".

== Attempts to break the curse ==
Before his death on October 22, 1970, William Sianis himself attempted to lift the curse. Sam Sianis, his nephew, has gone to Wrigley Field with a goat multiple times in attempts to break the curse, including on Opening Day in 1984 and again in 1989, both years in which the Cubs went on to win their division. In 1994, Sam Sianis went again, with a goat, to stop a home losing streak, and in 1998 for the Wild Card tie-breaker game, which the Cubs won.

In 2003 (the Chinese zodiac's Year of the Goat), a group of Cubs fans headed to Houston with a billy goat named "Virgil Homer" and attempted to gain entrance to Minute Maid Park, home of the Astros, division rivals of the Cubs at the time. After they were denied entrance, they unfurled a scroll, read a verse and proclaimed they were "reversing the curse". The Cubs won the division that year and then came within five outs of playing in the World Series, but were undone by the Florida Marlins' eight-run rally immediately following the Steve Bartman incident. The Cubs then lost the following game and with it the series. (The Marlins went on to win the World Series against the New York Yankees.) Further salting the wound, the Astros earned their first World Series berth two years later and their crosstown rival the Chicago White Sox won the series.

On February 26, 2004, at the Harry Caray Restaurant in downtown Chicago, the Bartman baseball was electrocuted in an attempt to break the curse, leaving nothing but a heap of string behind.

In another bizarre twist, it was reported that a butchered goat was hung from the Harry Caray statue on October 3, 2007, about which The Chicago Sun-Times noted: "If the prankster intended to reverse the supposed billy goat curse with the stunt, it doesn't appear to have worked." While the Cubs did win the NL Central division title in 2007 and 2008, they were swept in the first round of the postseason in both years: by the Arizona Diamondbacks in 2007 and the Los Angeles Dodgers in 2008. The elimination by Arizona came on October 6, the same date that the goat appeared at Wrigley Field in 1945. The act was repeated before the home opener in 2009; this time a goat's butchered head was hung from the statue. The act was futile as the Cubs were eliminated from postseason contention on September 26, 2009.

In 2008, a Greek Orthodox priest sought to end the curse during the 2008 playoffs with a spraying of holy water in and around the Cubs dugout to no avail.

On April 1, 2011, a social enterprise called Reverse The Curse, dedicated to bringing innovations to poverty by giving goats to families in developing countries, was initiated. The goats provide the families with milk, cheese, and alternative income to help lift them out of poverty. Reverse The Curse has expanded into reversing the "curses" that afflict the world's children in education and obesity.

On February 25, 2012, a group of five Chicago Cubs fans calling themselves Crack the Curse set out on foot from Mesa, Arizona (home to the Cubs' spring training facilities) to Wrigley Field. They brought along a goat named Wrigley who they believed would be able to break the Curse of the Billy Goat upon arrival at Wrigley Field. Additionally, they attempted to raise $100,000 for the Fred Hutchinson Cancer Research Center.

On April 10, 2013, a severed goat's head was delivered to the Cubs in a possible effort to lift the curse on the team. It was addressed to Cubs owner Thomas S. Ricketts.

On September 22, 2015, Patrick Bertoletti, Tim Brown, Takeru Kobayashi, Kevin Strahle and Bob Shoudt consumed a 40-pound goat in 13 minutes and 22 seconds at Taco in a Bag restaurant in Chicago.

== Former Cubs who won a World Series title elsewhere ==
Another factor that may have played a role in the curse was the number of players (44 of them are listed below) who won World Series titles after leaving the Cubs. These players include Andy Pafko (who, coincidentally, played in the 1945 World Series as a member of the Cubs), Gene Baker, Smoky Burgess, Don Hoak, Dale Long, Lou Brock (whose first title was in 1964 after a mid-season trade to the St. Louis Cardinals), Barney Schultz, Lou Johnson, Jim Brewer, Moe Drabowsky, Don Cardwell, Ken Holtzman, Billy North, Fred Norman, Bill Madlock, Manny Trillo, Greg Gross, Rick Monday, Burt Hooton, Bruce Sutter, Willie Hernández, Milt Wilcox, Joe Niekro, Dennis Eckersley (he made three consecutive World Series with Oakland, winning the middle bid in 1989), Billy Hatcher, Joe Carter (who hit a walk-off home run that won Toronto the World Series in 1993), Greg Maddux, Dwight Smith, Joe Girardi (as both a player and a manager), José Vizcaíno, Glenallen Hill (after his second stint with the Cubs; his title came in 2000 after a mid-season trade), Luis Gonzalez (who hit the walk-off bloop single that won Arizona the World Series in 2001), Mike Morgan, Mark Grace, Mark Bellhorn, Bill Mueller (drove in speedy pinch runner Dave Roberts to spark Boston's epic comeback in the 2004 ALCS), Scott Eyre (whose title came in 2008 after he had been traded from the Cubs during the season), Tom Gordon, Matt Stairs, Jamie Moyer, Jerry Hairston Jr., Mark DeRosa, Mike Fontenot, Ryan Theriot, Ángel Pagán, and, in 2013, Ryan Dempster. Dontrelle Willis and Jon Garland were traded as minor leaguers (coincidentally, Willis won a World Series ring with the Marlins team that defeated the Cubs in the 2003 NLCS). Tim Lincecum, who went on to win three World Series titles, was originally drafted by the Cubs, but he did not sign with them.

== End of the curse ==
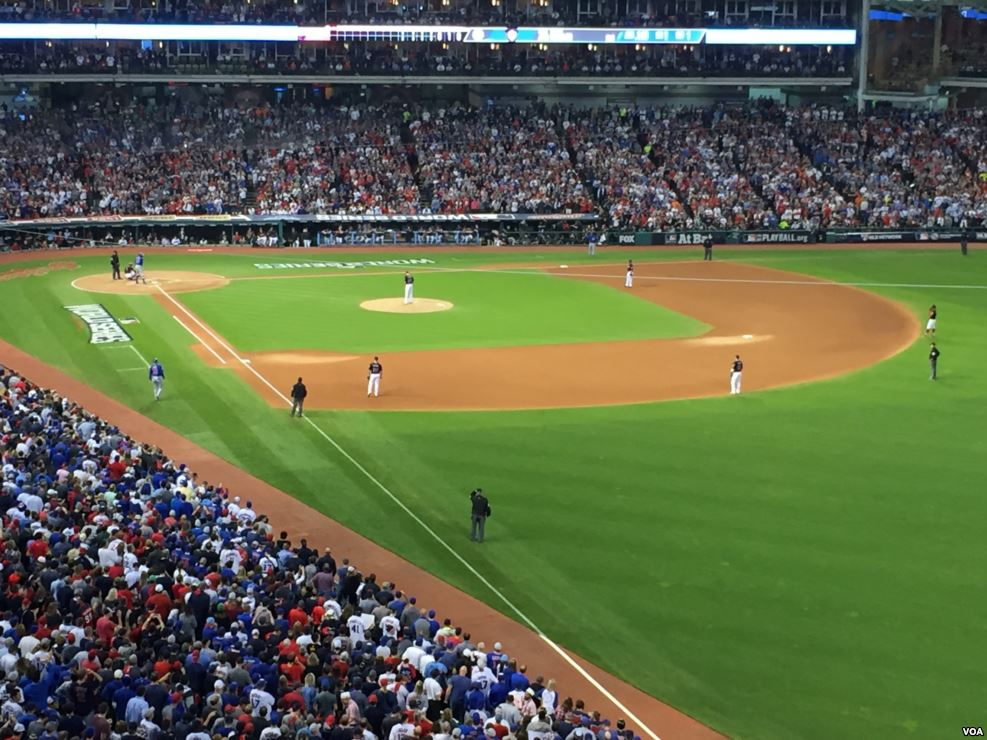
Cubs and Indians play Game 7 of the 2016 World Series

The Cubs ended the 2016 season with a 103–58 (.640) record. It was their first 100-win season since 1935 (100–54, .649), their best since 1910 (104–50, .675), and the sixth 100-win season in franchise history.

The Cubs won the National League Championship Series (NLCS), their first pennant in 71 years, with a 5–0 shutout in Game 6 against the Los Angeles Dodgers at Wrigley Field on October 22, 2016; the "curse" was broken on the 46th anniversary of Billy Sianis's death.

The Cubs beat the Cleveland Indians in the 2016 World Series in seven games after trailing in the series 3 games to 1. They won Game 7 by a score of 8–7 in 10 innings at Progressive Field in Cleveland, Ohio, ending their 108-year drought. Many mark Jason Heyward's speech in the weight room during the 17 minute rain delay as the moment that "killed" the curse. While the fans and media feared a "classic Cubs collapse," Heyward delivered a brief, impassioned speech:

"We're the best team in baseball... and we're the best team in baseball for a reason... Look at the guy next to you. We're going to pull this out." Refocused by the meeting, the Cubs emerged after the 17-minute delay and immediately scored two runs in the top of the 10th inning. Ben Zobrist’s go-ahead double and Miguel Montero’s RBI single provided the cushion needed to secure the 8–7 victory.

== In popular culture ==
The 1989 film Back to the Future Part II depicts the Cubs defeating the Miami Gators, a fictional baseball team, in the 2015 World Series, which ended the longest drought in all four of the North American professional sports leagues. In reality, however, the Cubs were eliminated from the playoffs by the Mets on October 21, 2015, which is the day the movie was set in. When the Cubs won the World Series the following year, the Back to the Future Twitter account tweeted that the prediction was one year off due to the 1994–95 Major League Baseball strike.

The short story "Curses", written by Jim Butcher and set in the Dresden Files universe, focuses on the curse. Wizard Harry Dresden is hired to look into it and try to lift it if possible, but discovers that the king of the Tylwyth Teg cast the curse while disguised as the goat in question and has been renewing it every year. After a friendly conversation with the king, who is himself a long-time Cubs fan, Harry decides not to interfere and risk jeopardizing the loyalty of the team's fan base.

== See also ==
- Baseball superstition
- Ex-Cubs Factor
- Sports-related curses
- Curse of the Bambino
- Curse of Rocky Colavito
- Curse of Billy Penn
- Curse of Shoeless Joe
