= Mark Prior =

American baseball player and coach (born 1980)

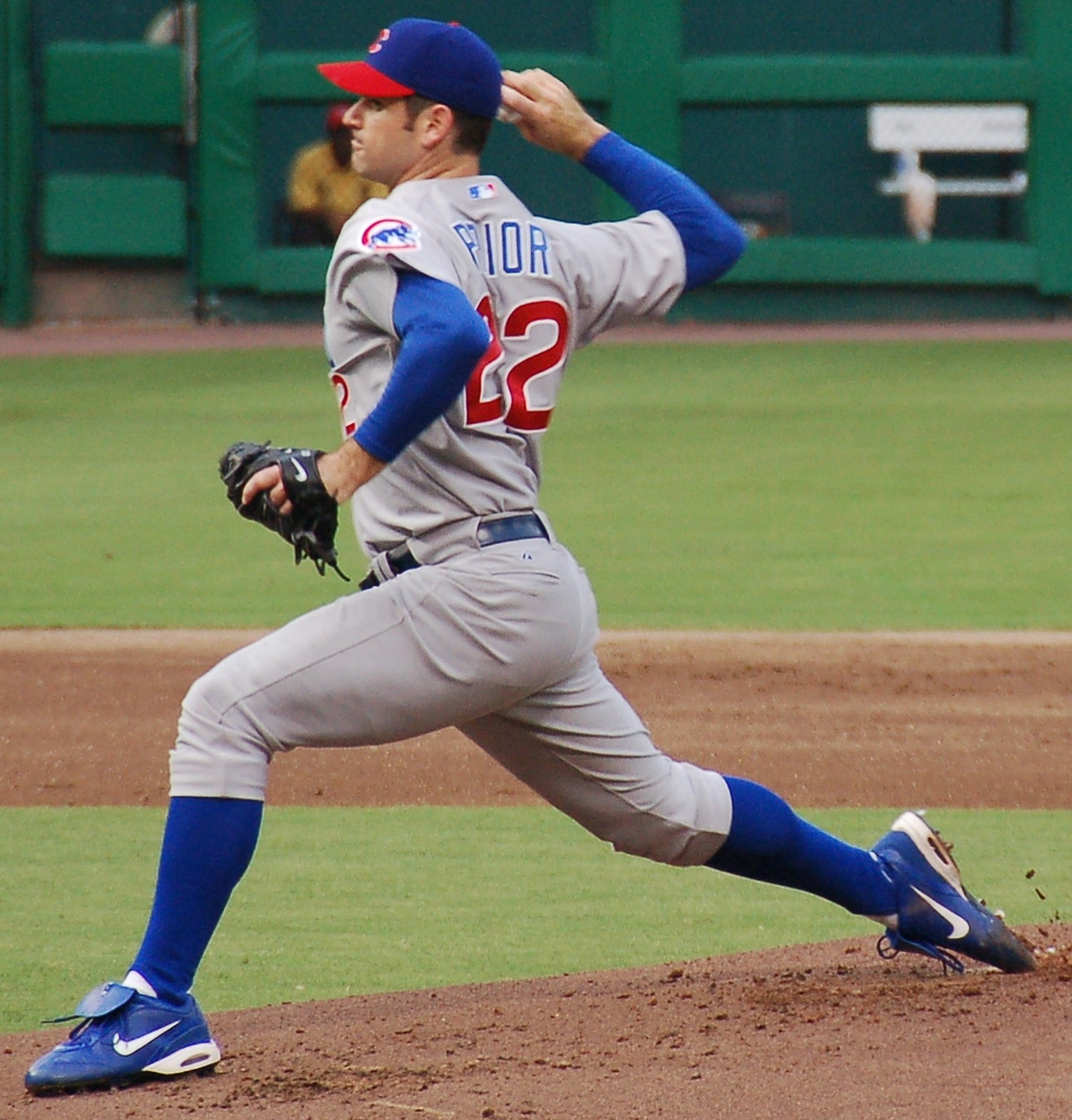
- Prior with the Chicago Cubs in 2006

Los Angeles Dodgers – No. 99
- Pitcher / Coach
- Born: September 7, 1980 (age 46); San Diego, California, U.S.
- Batted: Right Threw: Right

MLB debut
- May 22, 2002, for the Chicago Cubs

Last MLB appearance
- August 10, 2006, for the Chicago Cubs

MLB statistics
- Win–loss record: 42–29
- Earned run average: 3.51
- Strikeouts: 757
- Stats at Baseball Reference

Teams
- As player: Chicago Cubs (2002–2006); As coach: Los Angeles Dodgers (2018–present)

Career highlights and awards
- All-Star (2003); 3× World Series champion (2020, 2024, 2025); Golden Spikes Award (2001); Dick Howser Trophy (2001)

Mark William Prior (born September 7, 1980) is an American former professional baseball pitcher and current coach. A onetime top prospect of the Chicago Cubs, he pitched for the team from 2002 to 2006 in a career that was marred by injuries. In his prime, his repertoire of pitches included a mid-90s mph fastball, a curveball, and a changeup. He is the pitching coach for the Los Angeles Dodgers.

Born and raised in San Diego, California, Prior engaged Tom House as his pitching tutor in high school. A career at the University of Southern California, where he won the Golden Spikes Award, saw him become one of the top prospects in the 2001 MLB draft, when he was the second overall pick by the Cubs. He made only nine appearances in the minor leagues before debuting with the team in 2002. In 2003, he finished third in National League (NL) Cy Young Award voting, ranking among the leaders with 18 wins, a 2.43 earned run average (ERA), and 245 strikeouts. Helping the Cubs win the NL Central title, he outpitched Greg Maddux in the NL Division Series and won Game 2 of the NL Championship Series, but he was on the mound for Game 6 when Steve Bartman prevented Moisés Alou from catching a foul ball.

Prior had pitched a scoreless game up to this point, but the Florida Marlins went on to win the series in seven games after an eighth inning eight-run rally in that game, in which Prior received the loss. In 2004, he was on the disabled list twice but finished the season with a 16-strikeout performance against the Cincinnati Reds. He made 27 starts with the Cubs in 2005 and finished ninth in the NL in strikeouts despite missing some time due to injury. Multiple injuries limited him to nine games in 2006, and he did not pitch at all in 2007 due to tears in his labrum, anterior capsule, and rotator cuff. After the season, the Cubs non-tendered him, letting him become a free agent.

Prior never pitched in the major leagues again after that, though he tried several times. He pitched in the minor leagues for multiple organizations over the next six years before finally retiring at the end of the 2013 season. Once touted as having "perfect" pitching mechanics by ESPN and others, his "Inverted W" arm action has been discussed as a possible reason for his lack of durability, as well as Dusty Baker's heavy usage of him during the 2003 season, though Prior himself does not blame Baker for his injuries. Prior accepted a front office position with the San Diego Padres in 2013, then joined the Dodgers in 2018 as a bullpen coach, becoming their pitching coach in 2020. He has been a part of three World Series-winning clubs since joining the Dodgers, in 2020, 2024 and 2025.

== Amateur career ==
Born September 7, 1980, in San Diego, California, Prior was part of an athletic family. Jerry, his father, played college football for Vanderbilt University, and both of Mark's older siblings played sports as well. "Being the youngest of three kids, there's no room for me to step out of line," he quipped. Growing up, Prior attended the University of San Diego High School. As a sophomore, he worked with former Major League Baseball (MLB) pitcher Tom House, who had a business of tutoring young pitchers. Using computer analysis to try to determine the ideal pitching motion, House worked with Prior on his delivery and prescribed a detailed workout regimen which the pitcher would continue to utilize as his career advanced. He was originally drafted by the New York Yankees in the first round of the 1998 amateur draft and offered an approximately $1.5 million signing bonus, but the parties were unable to agree on a contract after negotiating all summer, and Prior chose to attend college instead, pursuing a business degree while playing college baseball.

As a freshman, Prior went to Vanderbilt. Tim Corbin later compared him to David Price and Kris Benson. He then transferred to the University of Southern California (USC), posting a 10–7 record his sophomore year and leading the USC Trojans to the 2000 College World Series. USC posted a 16–game winning streak before Prior helped USC reach the College World Series again in 2001, posting a 15–1 record and a 1.69 earned run average (ERA), striking out 202 in 138 2/3 innings while walking just 18. He won several awards that year, including the Dick Howser Trophy, the Golden Spikes Award, and the Rotary Smith Award.

== Professional career ==
=== Chicago Cubs ===
In 2001, Prior re-entered the draft and was considered "the consensus top player", according to ESPN. He was taken second overall by the Chicago Cubs, behind Joe Mauer, who was drafted by the Minnesota Twins. The Cubs signed Prior to a contract for $10.5 million, the highest signing bonus for a draft pick until the Washington Nationals gave Stephen Strasburg $15 million in 2009.

After nine starts in the minors, Prior was called up to the big leagues in 2002 as a 21-year-old. He made his Major League debut on May 22 at Wrigley Field against the Pittsburgh Pirates and became one of 14 Cub pitchers since 1920 to win his first major league start by striking out 10 batters over six innings pitched in a 7–4 victory. Teammate Sammy Sosa said, "I was impressed with what he did today. Going out there in front of 40,000 people and throwing the way he did, that was a good sign." On June 7, he threw 128 pitches and struck out 11 while allowing no runs in a 2–0 win over the Seattle Mariners. He threw his first career complete game on August 4, striking out 13, allowing one run, and throwing 136 pitches in a 4–1 win over the Colorado Rockies. "I was kind of surprised that they did send me out there," he said, when he found out he was pitching the ninth. On August 15, he struck out seven hitters in a row, tying the Cubs' record shared by Jamie Moyer and Kerry Wood. In total, he struck out 12 in six innings, earning a no decision in an eventual 6–4 win. During a game against the St. Louis Cardinals on August 31, he was removed because of a strained left hamstring. Two days later, the Cubs announced they were shutting him down for the rest of the year because of the injury. Prior finished his rookie campaign with a 6–6 record with a 3.32 ERA, and 147 strikeouts in 116 2/3 innings pitched. The Sporting News called his rookie season "stellar", and he finished seventh in National League (NL) Rookie of the Year Award voting.

In his second start of the 2003 season, Prior pitched his first career shutout, striking out 12 and allowing four hits in a 3–0 win over the Montreal Expos. In six innings on May 12, he allowed four runs to the Milwaukee Brewers but struck out 11 and earned the victory in an 11–5 triumph. He struck out 16 Brewers on June 26, allowing two runs in eight innings but getting a no decision in a 5–3 loss. In the second inning of a game against the Atlanta Braves on July 11, Prior had to exit after suffering a violent on-field collision with Atlanta second baseman Marcus Giles. The injury forced him to the disabled list (DL) with shoulder stiffness. (Note: Prior and Giles had both been chosen to play in the All-Star Game, but were forced to miss the game as a result of their injuries.) Selected as National League All-Stars in 2003, both Prior and fellow right-handed pitcher Kerry Wood were dubbed "Chicago Heat" by Sports Illustrated. Sportswriter George Vecsey compared them to other famed rotation twosomes, like Warren Spahn and Lew Burdette, or Randy Johnson and Curt Schilling. According to CBS Local, sportswriters and fans criticized Cubs manager Dusty Baker on the high pitch counts of the two aces. Prior averaged 113.4 pitches per starts in the regular season, that number rising to 126.1 in September and 122.7 in the playoffs. However, the contributions of the two aces helped lead the Cubs to an 88-win season and an NL Central division title.

Against his hometown San Diego Padres on August 5, Prior returned from the DL, allowing two hits and no runs in six inning and earning the victory in a 3–0 win. After his return, he compiled a 10–1 record, striking out 13, 14, and 10 in his final three starts of the season. On September 27, he gave up two runs and struck out 10 in 6 2/3 innings, defeating the Pittsburgh Pirates for the win in Game 1 of a doubleheader. That win brought the Cubs' magic number to one for the division title, and they won the second game to win the division for the first time since 1989. Tied for the second most wins as a NL pitcher with Woody Williams in 2003, Prior finished third in NL Cy Young Award voting after compiling an 18–6 win–loss record. His 2.43 ERA was third in the NL (behind Jason Schmidt's 2.34 and Kevin Brown's 2.39), his 245 strikeouts were topped only by Wood's 266, and his .750 winning percentage was tied with three others for second in the NL behind Schmidt's .773.

In the NL Division Series, the Cubs faced Atlanta, and Prior started Game 3 against former Cub Greg Maddux. Prior allowed two hits and one run, throwing a complete game and striking out seven as the Cubs won 3–1. With a five-game series win over the Braves, the Cubs faced the Florida Marlins in the NL Championship Series. Prior pitched into the eighth inning in Game 2, allowing three runs (two earned) and striking out five in a 12–3 victory, before taking the mound again in Game 6. For seven innings, he threw scoreless ball, allowing just three hits as the Cubs took a 3–0 lead. When Mike Mordecai flew out against him to start the eighth, the Cubs were five outs away from playing in their first World Series since 1945. Then, Juan Pierre hit a double, bringing up Luis Castillo, who hit a foul ball down the left field line that outfielder Moisés Alou gave chase to. The ball came down at the edge of the stands, and Steve Bartman, a fan, reached for it, preventing Alou from making the catch. Castillo went on to walk, and Prior and the Cubs never recovered from the incident. Prior struggled with his command and gave up the lead with the aid of poor defensive play, most notably a booted ground ball by shortstop Alex Gonzalez that might have resulted in a double play. After Derrek Lee hit an RBI double off him that tied the game and put runners at second and third, Prior was removed from the game and replaced with Kyle Farnsworth. The Marlins went on to score eight runs that inning, and Prior was charged with the loss in the 8–3 defeat. The Cubs went on to lose Game 7, and their 94-year-long World Series drought continued.

Prior was forced to miss the first two months of the 2004 season due to an achilles tendon injury and elbow soreness. In his return on June 4, he struck out eight Pirates, allowing two hits and no runs in six innings, though the Cubs lost 2–1. His ERA went up to 5.05 after he gave up seven runs over three innings in an 8–6 loss to San Diego on August 10, and Ramon Hernandez of the Padres noticed a difference. "When I faced Prior the first time in my life he was throwing 96, 97. Today he was throwing 91-94 and he was a little wild and out of the zone. He was hurt for a long time. It might take a little bit of time for him to be the Prior that everybody has seen." Prior posted a 3.06 ERA after that, and in his last three games of the season, he allowed just two runs in 24 1/3 innings. He tied a career-high by striking out 16 Cincinnati Reds over nine innings in his "best game of the season" according to ESPN, though the Cubs went on to lose 2–1 in the 12th inning. Prior finished 2004 with a 6–4 record and a 4.02 ERA in 21 starts, striking out 139 in 118 2/3 innings.

Elbow inflammation caused Prior to start the 2005 season on the disabled list, though he was activated on April 12. He won his first three starts and posted a 2.93 ERA through May 27. However, against the Rockies that day, Prior was hit on his right (pitching) elbow by a 117-mph comeback line drive off the bat of Brad Hawpe, giving him a compression fracture. This sent him to another stint on the DL. Coincidentally, Hawpe had hit a three-run home run off Prior in the 2000 College World Series while playing for the Louisiana State University Tigers.

Returning from the DL on June 26, Prior limited the Chicago White Sox to one hit in six innings, earning the win in a 2–0 triumph. He remained in the team's rotation the rest of the year, not having to miss time with any other injuries. Against the Pirates on July 14, he allowed two hits and one unearned run in eight innings, earning the win in a 5–1 victory. Prior finished the 2005 season with an 11–7 record in 27 starts, striking out 188 in 166 2/3 innings. His 188 strikeouts were the ninth-most in the NL, despite his time missed due to injury.

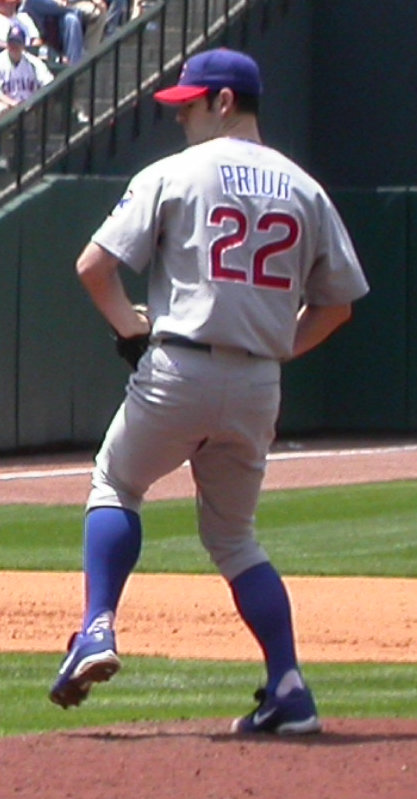
Prior pitching for the Cubs in 2005

During the 2005 off-season, after Nomar Garciaparra left the Cubs via free agency, Prior was mentioned by Ken Rosenthal of Fox Sports as part of a possible deal for Baltimore Orioles's shortstop Miguel Tejada, but this trade did not come to pass. As in 2005, Prior started the 2006 season on the disabled list. This time, though, it was because of a strained right shoulder, and the injury caused him to miss the first two months of the 2006 season. His debut came on June 18, when he had what ESPN called "one of the worst outings of his career" against the Detroit Tigers, giving up six runs in the first inning and lasting just 3 2/3 innings before being pulled. Prior was 0–4 in four starts with a 7.71 ERA, until he was once again put on the disabled list on July 14, after straining his left oblique muscle while taking batting practice on July 8. Since he had not pitched since July 4, he was eligible to return on July 21 against the Nationals. He pitched only 3 1/3 innings before he was pulled out of the game, allowing four runs and taking a no decision in an eventual 7–6 loss. Against the Brewers on August 10, Prior's pitch speed slowed in the third inning of his start. He was replaced by Juan Mateo in the fourth inning, having allowed six runs (five earned) in an eventual 8–6 defeat. Two days later, he was placed on the disabled list (tendinitis) for the third time that season, missing the remainder of the year. He finished the 2006 season with a 1–6 record and a 7.22 ERA in nine starts, striking out 38 against 28 walks in 43 2/3 innings.

Eligible for arbitration, Prior asked for a pay raise from his 2006 salary of $3.65 million to $3.875 million for 2007. The Cubs avoided arbitration with Prior when he settled for a one-year $3.575 million contract for 2007. Prior found himself competing with Wade Miller to be the Cubs' fifth starter in 2007, and he was optioned to the minor leagues before the season began. After one start in the minors, in which he gave up three runs and got the win, Prior received exploratory surgery on his right shoulder by James Andrews, a noted orthopedic surgeon; the procedure showed evidence of vast structural damage. There were tears in Prior's labrum, anterior capsule, and rotator cuff. As a result, Prior missed the rest of the 2007 season. Cubs general manager (GM) Jim Hendry said that anything provided by Prior or Wood would be "gravy" and he hoped that this would come to fruition. The Associated Press reported that the injury was not expected to be career-ending. Prior was non-tendered on December 12, 2007, ending his tenure with the Cubs.

=== Other organizations, comeback attempts ===
==== San Diego Padres (2008-09) ====
On December 26, 2007, Prior agreed to a $1 million, one-year, incentive-laden contract with the San Diego Padres. Prior had hoped to pitch again by May or June of the 2008 season, but another tear of his right anterior capsule during his rehab in May 2008 required surgery on June 4 that forced him to miss his second consecutive season. On January 13, 2009, Prior agreed to another one-year contract with the Padres, this one a minor league deal, which included a $1 million option if Prior pitched in the major leagues in 2009. He was released from his contract on August 1, 2009, after the team was disappointed by a lack of progress in his rehab.

==== Orange County Flyers (independent), Texas Rangers (2010) ====
By November 2009, throwing a ball 30 feet resulted in pain for Prior. That month, he hired Jackson Crowther, a former minor league pitcher who had also attended USC, to help him with his rehab. They focused on trying to grow muscle groups in the shoulder region, in hopes of helping stabilize the joint. On June 30, 2010, Prior returned to USC to perform a workout for major league scouts, but the workout was judged as "just all right" by an unnamed veteran scout.

Unable to sign with a major league team, Prior agreed to an independent league contract with the Orange County Flyers of the Golden Baseball League on August 3, 2010. Used out of the bullpen for the team, he allowed no earned runs in 11 innings over 9 games with 22 strikeouts. On September 3, he signed with the Texas Rangers on a minor league contract. He pitched one scoreless inning for their Triple-A affiliate, the Oklahoma City RedHawks.

==== New York Yankees (2011) ====
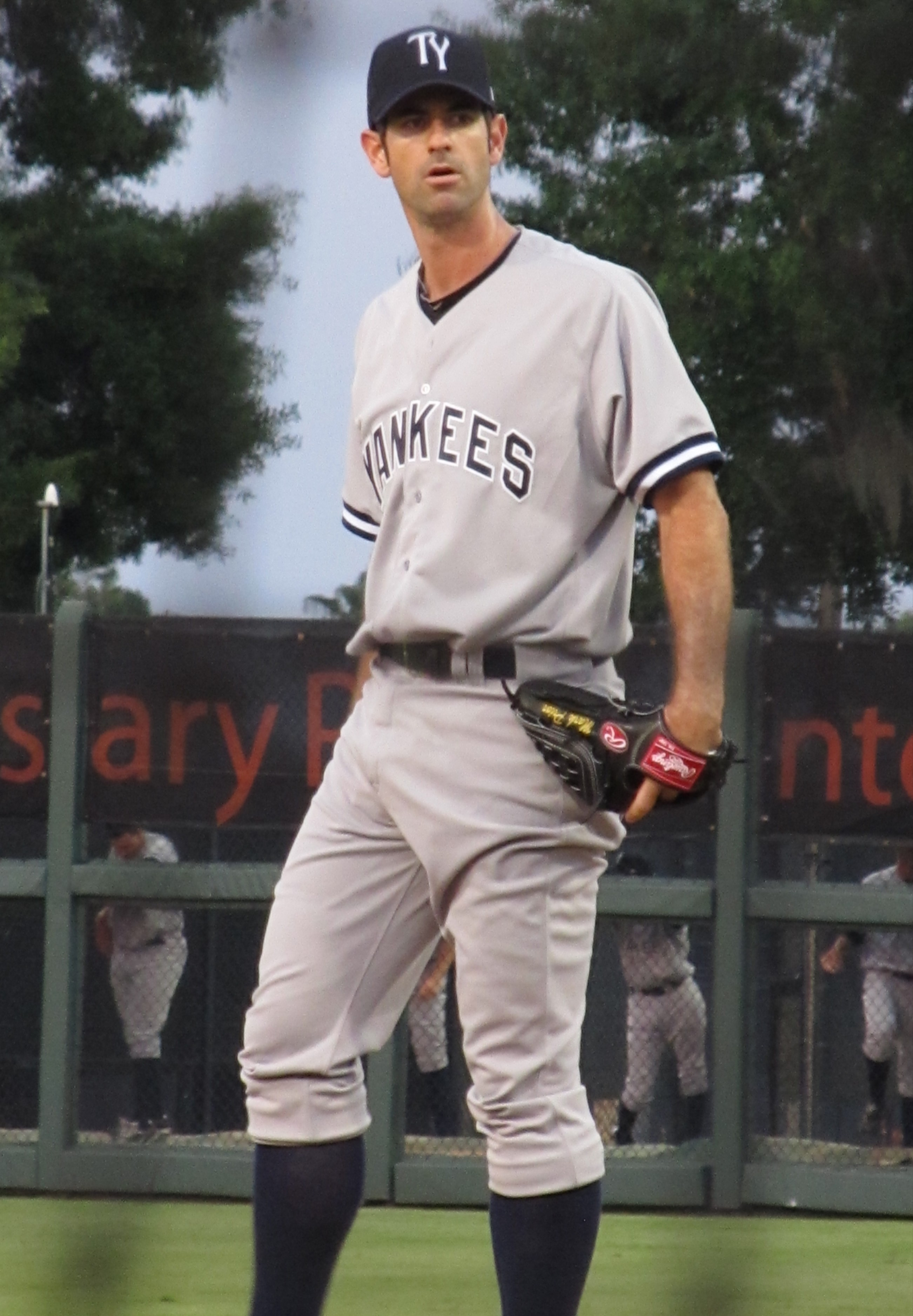
Prior with the Tampa Yankees in 2011

Prior signed a one-year minor league contract with the New York Yankees for the 2011 season, though he was an unlikely candidate to make the Yankees' roster because their only projected vacancy was for a long reliever. Prior was assigned to start the year with the Single-A advanced Tampa Yankees in Florida rather than joining the colder weather Triple-A Scranton/Wilkes-Barre Yankees in order to work on his transition to a relief pitcher. After just four games, he was promoted to Scranton on April 20 but promptly placed on the disabled list with a groin injury. Ultimately, Prior would make 11 appearances in the minor leagues for the Yankees, only one of which was at Triple-A. He was granted free agency on November 2, 2011.

==== Boston Red Sox (2012) ====
Unsigned to begin the 2012 season, Prior secured a minor league contract with the Boston Red Sox on May 2 and pitched in their extended spring training program. Later joining the Pawtucket Red Sox, he provided the Triple-A team with "stellar" pitching, according to Teddy Mitrosilis of ESPN, though he was walking too many hitters. In 19 games for Pawtucket (all in relief), Prior had a 1–0 record, a 3.96 ERA, and 38 strikeouts in 25 innings, though he walked 23. He was released by the Red Sox on August 17 in order to make room for a newly acquired prospect on the roster.

==== Cincinnati Reds (2013) ====
In February 2013, Prior called Baker, now manager of the Reds, to see if Cincinnati was interested in signing him. The Reds gave him a physical, and when he passed, they signed him to a minor league contract on March 1, 2013. He made seven appearances for the Triple-A Louisville Bats but was placed on the disabled list in April with a shoulder injury. On June 28, the Reds released Prior. He announced his retirement from baseball in December.

== Pitching style ==
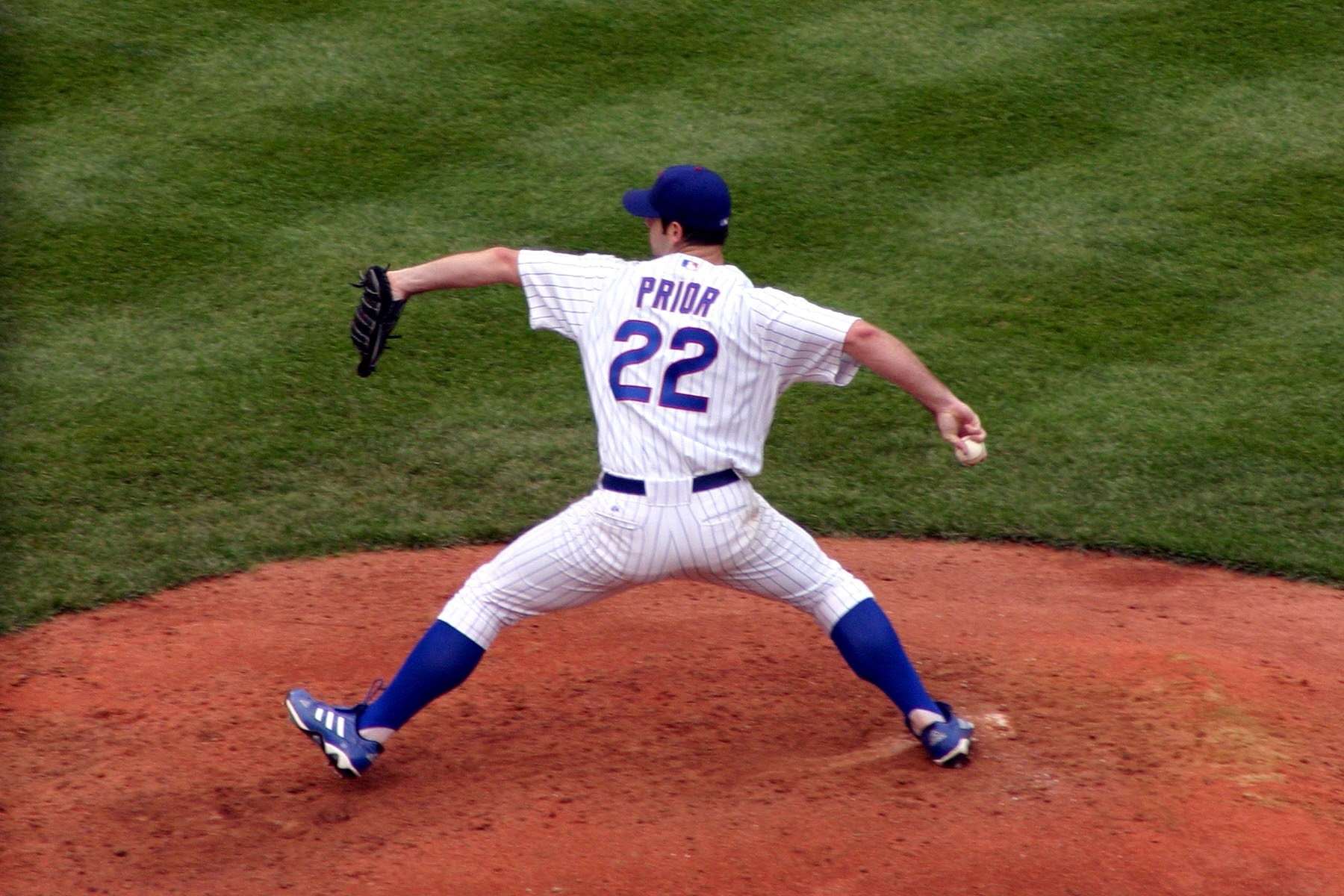
Prior pitching for the Cubs at Wrigley Field on July 30, 2004

In his prime, Prior's repertoire of pitches included a mid-90s mph fastball, a curveball, and a changeup. The fastball reached speeds of up to 97 miles per hour, at its fastest, while the curve featured a sharp, downward break, travelling about 10 miles per hour slower. Teammate Kerry Wood praised his fearlessness and control: ""He's not worried about throwing an inside fastball to a Jeff Bagwell with men on second and third...If that's the pitch he needs to make, he'll make it." Damian Miller, his catcher with the Cubs in 2003, compared him to Curt Schilling, noting that both pitchers threw a lot of high fastballs. Daniel Habib of Sports Illustrated called him "fundamentally sound", also praising his "sophisticated approach" to hitters.

Early in Prior's career, his pitching mechanics were touted as "perfect", according to The Sporting News. House tried to help him develop a mechanically efficient and sound delivery. Sports reporter Buster Olney called his mechanics "smooth, fluid, consistent," opining that his delivery made him less of an injury-risk than teammate Wood. House said that same year, "He's up there with Nolan Ryan...he has better mechanics than Roger Clemens, if only by percentage points. He has Greg Maddux mechanics with a Kerry Wood/Nolan Ryan type of arm. He's going to, with maturity, get bigger and stronger, too. It's a gene-pool thing." House also labelled Prior a "can't-miss" prospect.

However, after Prior's rash of injuries, people reexamined his delivery. His throwing motion drew criticism from "armchair biomechanists", according to Yahoo.com. Chris O'Leary speculated that some of the trouble was due to Prior's "Inverted W" arm action, in which he lifted his elbows above and behind the level of his shoulders, with the forearm pointing down. According to O'Leary, this created a timing problem that placed an undue stress on the muscles and ligaments of the shoulder and elbow because the arm got up to the "cocked position" too late. Similarly, Dick Mills, a former major league pitcher and co-author of The Science and Art of Baseball Pitching and Pitching.com, speculated that Prior's injuries were a result of scapular loading, a movement in which a pitcher's shoulder blades are pinched together and elbows are taken behind, and sometimes above, their shoulders.

On the other hand, Ryan Fagan of The Sporting News speculated that Prior's injuries may have been the result of manager Dusty Baker overusing him in his early career, also pointing to his shoulder injury after running into Giles as a potential source of the trouble. Critics made Baker their "scapegoat", according to Jason Buckland of the New York Times, blaming him for overusing his young pitcher. Prior himself speculated that the Giles injury and Hawpe's line drive were big factors. He said "I don't blame Dusty for what happened to me," observing that Baker had to balance how often to use the pitchers with making decisions that would help the Cubs win.

== Coaching career ==
After his playing career ended, Prior accepted a front office position with the Padres in 2013 as an assistant in the team's baseball operations department, in a capacity designed to acquaint him with how a baseball front office worked. In 2015, he became San Diego's minor league pitching coordinator, serving in that capacity for three seasons.

Prior was hired by the Los Angeles Dodgers as their bullpen coach for the 2018 season. In 2018, MLB columnist Tim Brown speculated that the Dodgers might groom Prior to take over as their pitching coach when Rick Honeycutt eventually retired. After Honeycutt was reassigned in 2020, the Dodgers ended up making Prior their pitching coach. Prior received World Series rings as a member of the Dodgers organization in 2020, 2024, and 2025.

== Personal life ==
Prior married Heather Gora on November 15, 2003. The couple have three children: Amanda, Caitlin, and Matthew. After becoming a professional baseball player, Prior continued his education part time and received a business degree from the USC Marshall School of Business in 2004.

== Notes ==
Preceded by Josh Bard	Los Angeles Dodgers bullpen coach 2018–2019	Succeeded by Josh Bard
Preceded by Rick Honeycutt	Los Angeles Dodgers Pitching Coach; 2020–present	Succeeded by Incumbent
