= 2003 National League Division Series =

American baseball games

Teams
Team (Wins)		Manager	Season
Chicago Cubs (3)		Dusty Baker	88–74 (.543), GA: 1
Atlanta Braves (2)		Bobby Cox	101–61 (.623), GA: 10
- Dates: September 30–October 5
- Television: Fox (Games 1, 4–5); ESPN/WGN (Games 2–3)
- TV announcers: Thom Brennaman, Steve Lyons (Games 1, 4), and Chris Myers (Game 4); Jon Miller, Joe Morgan, and Gary Miller (Games 2–3); Thom Brennaman and Tim McCarver (Game 5)
- Radio: ESPN
- Radio announcers: Jim Durham and Joe Girardi
- Umpires: Games 1–2 & 5: Bruce Froemming, Hunter Wendelstedt, Dale Scott, Gary Cederstrom, Jeff Kellogg, Phil Cuzzi; Games 3–4: John Hirschbeck, Bill Miller, Brian Gorman, Larry Young, Ed Rapuano, Mark Wegner

Teams
Team (Wins)		Manager	Season
Florida Marlins (3)		Jack McKeon	91–71 (.562), GB: 10
San Francisco Giants (1)		Felipe Alou	100–61 (.621), GA: 15 1/2
- Dates: September 30–October 4
- Television: ESPN/WGN (Games 1–2); ESPN2 (Games 3–4)
- TV announcers: Chris Berman (Games 1–3), Dave O'Brien (Game 4), Rick Sutcliffe, and Tony Gwynn
- Radio: ESPN
- Radio announcers: Gary Cohen and Luis Gonzalez
- Umpires: Games 1–2: John Hirschbeck, Bill Miller, Brian Gorman, Larry Young, Ed Rapuano, Mark Wegner; Games 3–4: Bruce Froemming, Hunter Wendelstedt, Dale Scott, Gary Cederstrom, Jeff Kellogg, Phil Cuzzi

The 2003 National League Division Series (NLDS) consisted of two best-of-five playoff series on the National League side in Major League Baseball’s (MLB) 2003 postseason, began on Tuesday, September 30, and ended on Sunday, October 5, with the champions of the three NL divisions—along with a "wild card" team—participating in two series. The teams were:

Under MLB's playoff format, no two teams from the same division were matched up in the Division Series, regardless of whether their records would normally indicate such a matchup. Home field advantage went to the team with the better regular-season record with the exception of the wild card team, which defers home field advantage regardless of record. The matchups were:

- (1) Atlanta Braves (NL East champions) vs. (3) Chicago Cubs (NL Central champions): Cubs won the series, 3–2.
- (2) San Francisco Giants (NL West champions) vs. (4) Florida Marlins (Wild Card qualifier): Marlins won the series, 3–1.

The higher seeded team in each series hosts Games 1, 2, and 5 (if necessary), and the lower seeded team hosts Games 3 and 4 (if necessary).

The Cubs and Marlins met in the NL Championship Series, with the Marlins winning in seven games. They went on to win the 2003 World Series, defeating the American League champion New York Yankees in six games.

== Matchups ==
=== Atlanta Braves vs. Chicago Cubs ===
Chicago won the series, 3–2.

Game	Date	Score	Location	Time	Attendance
1	September 30	Chicago Cubs – 4, Atlanta Braves – 2	Turner Field	3:21	52,043
2	October 1	Chicago Cubs – 3, Atlanta Braves – 5	Turner Field	3:07	52,743
3	October 3	Atlanta Braves – 1, Chicago Cubs – 3	Wrigley Field	2:43	39,982
4	October 4	Atlanta Braves – 6, Chicago Cubs – 4	Wrigley Field	3:40	39,983
5	October 5	Chicago Cubs – 5, Atlanta Braves – 1	Turner Field	2:50	54,357

=== San Francisco Giants vs. Florida Marlins ===
Florida won the series, 3–1.

Game	Date	Score	Location	Time	Attendance
1	September 30	Florida Marlins – 0, San Francisco Giants – 2	Pacific Bell Park	2:33	43,704
2	October 1	Florida Marlins – 9, San Francisco Giants – 5	Pacific Bell Park	3:06	43,766
3	October 3	San Francisco Giants – 3, Florida Marlins – 4 (11)	Pro Player Stadium	4:11	61,488
4	October 4	San Francisco Giants – 6, Florida Marlins – 7	Pro Player Stadium	3:19	65,464

== Atlanta vs. Chicago ==
=== Game 1 ===
September 30, 2003 8:18 pm (EDT) at Turner Field in Atlanta, Georgia 66 °F (19 °C), clear
Team	1	2	3	4	5	6	7	8	9	R	H	E
Chicago	0	0	0	0	0	4	0	0	0	4	10	0
Atlanta	0	0	1	0	0	0	0	1	0	2	3	1
WP: Kerry Wood (1–0) LP: Russ Ortiz (0–1) Sv: Joe Borowski (1); Home runs: CHC: None; ATL: Marcus Giles (1); Attendance: 52,043; Boxscore

In Game 1, Kerry Wood of Chicago faced Russ Ortiz of Atlanta. Both pitchers were on their game and in the bottom of the third inning the Braves struck first when Marcus Giles's home run put them up 1–0. The score remained that way until the top of the sixth, when the Cubs loaded the bases with three consecutive leadoff singles. However, Ortiz got the next two outs, with the last being an RBI groundout by Paul Bako. Wood doubled in two runs, then scored on Kenny Lofton's single to make it 4–1 Cubs. The Braves loaded the bases in the eighth off Wood on a strike-three wild pitch and two walks, but scored only one run on Chipper Jones's forceout off Mike Remlinger. Kyle Farnsworth stranded the bases loaded while Joe Borowski pitched a scoreless ninth to give the Cubs a series lead. Combined, the Cubs bullpen allowed only one hit, a ninth-inning single by Vinny Castilla. This was the Cubs' first road postseason victory since Game 3 of the 1945 World Series.

=== Game 2 ===
October 1, 2003 7:06 pm (EDT) at Turner Field in Atlanta, Georgia 64 °F (18 °C), windy
Team	1	2	3	4	5	6	7	8	9	R	H	E
Chicago	2	0	0	0	0	0	0	1	0	3	6	0
Atlanta	1	0	0	1	0	1	0	2	X	5	13	0
WP: John Smoltz (1–0) LP: Dave Veres (0–1); Attendance: 52,743; Boxscore

In Game 2, Carlos Zambrano of the Cubs faced Mike Hampton of the Braves. Hampton ran into trouble in the first when two leadoff walks put two men on for Sammy Sosa, who doubled in the first run of the game, then Moisés Alou brought in a run on a fielder's choice. After Aramis Ramírez singled to load the bases, Hampton recovered to strikeout six consecutive batters. Hampton struck out Eric Karros, Ramón Martínez and Damian Miller to end the first. He then struck out Carlos Zambrano, Kenny Lofton and Mark Grudzielanek in the second. Sosa led off the third with a single to end the streak. Hampton's six consecutive strikeouts set a Division Series record and tied an overall postseason record held by three other pitchers: Todd Worrell in 1985, Moe Drabowski in 1966 and Hod Eller in 1919. The Braves cut the lead in half when Chipper Jones forced Mark DeRosa out at second, allowing Rafael Furcal to score in the bottom half of the first. Then Andruw Jones's RBI single tied the game in the fourth. In the bottom of the sixth, Marcus Giles would give the Braves the lead with an RBI single to left field. A sacrifice fly by Tom Goodwin off John Smoltz tied the game in the eighth. However, Mark DeRosa's clutch two-out, two-run double off Dave Veres in the bottom half put the Braves ahead 5–3 and Smoltz finished it with a perfect ninth.

=== Game 3 ===
October 3, 2003 7:39 pm (CDT) at Wrigley Field in Chicago, Illinois 54 °F (12 °C), overcast
Team	1	2	3	4	5	6	7	8	9	R	H	E
Atlanta	0	0	0	0	0	0	0	1	0	1	2	4
Chicago	2	0	0	0	0	0	0	1	X	3	8	0
WP: Mark Prior (1–0) LP: Greg Maddux (0–1); Attendance: 39,982; Boxscore

In Game 3, Greg Maddux faced Mark Prior. In the bottom of the first, the Cubs put two runs on the board thanks to Randall Simon's two-run single, but neither team could score off Maddux or Prior again until the eighth inning. A sacrifice fly by Marcus Giles cut the lead in half after Mark DeRosa doubled and moved to third on a ground out, but Aramis Ramírez gave Prior insurance with an RBI double after a one-out single in the bottom of the eighth off Kevin Gryboski. Prior pitched a complete-game, two-hit masterpiece. Game 3 was Maddux's final game with the Braves after 11 seasons, as he returned to the Cubs as a free agent in 2004.

=== Game 4 ===
October 4, 2003 3:18 pm (CDT) at Wrigley Field in Chicago, Illinois 55 °F (13 °C), cloudy
Team	1	2	3	4	5	6	7	8	9	R	H	E
Atlanta	0	0	0	1	3	0	0	2	0	6	12	0
Chicago	0	0	1	0	0	1	0	1	1	4	10	0
WP: Russ Ortiz (1–1) LP: Matt Clement (0–1) Sv: John Smoltz (1); Home runs: ATL: Chipper Jones 2 (2); CHC: Eric Karros 2 (2); Attendance: 39,983; Boxscore

In Game 4, Russ Ortiz faced Matt Clement, hoping to end the series. Both pitchers held off the opposition until the Cubs broke through in the bottom of the third. Moisés Alou would double in Sammy Sosa, who walked with two outs, to give the Cubs a 1–0 lead. However, Darren Bragg's forceout allowed Julio Franco to score to tie the game in the top of the fourth. Then Chipper Jones's two-run home run gave the Braves a 3–1 lead in the fifth. After a two-out walk and single, Vinny Castilla added another run with an RBI single to make it 4–1 Braves. Eric Karros's home run in the sixth cut their lead to 4–2, but Chipper Jones's second two-run home run off Mark Guthrie made it 6–2 Braves in the eighth. Karros's second home run of the game in the bottom of the inning off Will Cunnane made it 6–3 Braves, then back-to-back leadoff doubles by Randall Simon and Damian Miller off John Smoltz in the ninth made it 6–4, but Smoltz retired the next three hitters with the final out being a long fly ball to center field off the bat of Sosa to end the game and send the series back to Atlanta.

=== Game 5 ===
October 5, 2003 7:48 pm (EDT) at Turner Field in Atlanta, Georgia 72 °F (22 °C), cloudy
Team	1	2	3	4	5	6	7	8	9	R	H	E
Chicago	1	1	0	0	0	2	0	0	1	5	9	0
Atlanta	0	0	0	0	0	1	0	0	0	1	5	1
WP: Kerry Wood (2–0) LP: Mike Hampton (0–1); Home runs: CHC: Alex S. Gonzalez (1), Aramis Ramírez (1); ATL: None; Attendance: 54,357; Boxscore

In Game 5, Kerry Wood this time faced Mike Hampton. Hampton once again gave up early runs when the Cubs took a 1–0 lead in the first with a Moisés Alou RBI single. Then Alex S. Gonzalez's leadoff home run next inning gave the Cubs a 2–0 lead. Aramis Ramírez's two-run home run silenced the crowd in the sixth and made it 4–0 Chicago. An RBI forceout by Gary Sheffield gave the Braves their only run of the night in the sixth, but the Cubs would add a run in the ninth off Will Cunnane thanks to an errant throw to first by Vinny Castilla on a ground ball by Eric Karros, who scored on Tom Goodwin's double, to take a commanding 5–1 lead. Joe Borowski sent down the Braves 1–2–3 in the ninth and the Cubs' win in Game 5 gave the Cubs their first postseason series win since the 1908 World Series.

=== Composite box ===
2003 NLDS (3–2): Chicago Cubs over Atlanta Braves

Team	1	2	3	4	5	6	7	8	9	R	H	E
Chicago Cubs	5	1	1	0	0	7	0	3	2	19	43	0
Atlanta Braves	1	0	1	2	3	2	0	6	0	15	35	6
Total attendance: 239,108 Average attendance: 47,822

== San Francisco vs. Florida ==
The Florida Marlins completed their second winning season in franchise history. The San Francisco Giants were the defending NL Champions and making their second straight postseason appearance.

=== Game 1 ===
September 30, 2003 1:06 pm (PDT) at Pacific Bell Park in San Francisco, California 71 °F (22 °C), sunny
Team	1	2	3	4	5	6	7	8	9	R	H	E
Florida	0	0	0	0	0	0	0	0	0	0	3	1
San Francisco	0	0	0	1	0	0	0	1	X	2	3	2
WP: Jason Schmidt (1–0) LP: Josh Beckett (0–1); Attendance: 43,704; Boxscore

In Game 1, Josh Beckett faced Jason Schmidt and a classic pitcher's duel began. The game remained scoreless until the bottom of the fourth. Two walks to lead off spelled doom for Beckett, as an error by Miguel Cabrera on Edgardo Alfonzo's single allowed a run to score to make it 1–0 Giants. Both pitchers kept the game close and Beckett allowed only two hits (a Ray Durham single to lead off the first). Schmidt allowed only three hits for a complete game win. Alfonzo brought in the game's other run on an RBI double in the eighth off Chad Fox after Barry Bonds was intentionally walked with two outs.

=== Game 2 ===
October 1, 2003 1:06 pm (PDT) at Pacific Bell Park in San Francisco, California 66 °F (19 °C), overcast
Team	1	2	3	4	5	6	7	8	9	R	H	E
Florida	1	0	0	0	3	3	1	1	0	9	14	0
San Francisco	1	0	0	3	1	0	0	0	0	5	8	2
WP: Carl Pavano (1–0) LP: Joe Nathan (0–1); Home runs: FLA: Juan Encarnación (1); SF: None; Attendance: 43,766; Boxscore

In Game 2, Brad Penny faced Sidney Ponson. The game would feature six pitching changes for each team as both starters would last less than half the game. An RBI groundout in the top of the first by Derrek Lee after two leadoff singles and a wild pitch gave the Marlins their first lead in the series, but Barry Bonds tied the game with a two-out double after a leadoff single in the bottom half. The game then quieted until the bottom of the fourth when Edgardo Alfonzo doubled in two runs after a single and walk and then scored on Marquis Grissom's groundout. The Giants now had a 4–1 lead, but in the top of the fifth, after singles by Jeff Conine and Todd Hollandsworth, RBI singles by Iván Rodríguez and Juan Pierre as well as Luis Castillo's groundout tied the game. The Giants would recapture the lead with an RBI hit by J. T. Snow off Rick Helling in the bottom of the fifth. However, Juan Encarnación's home run with one out off Joe Nathan tied the game in the sixth. The Marlins then loaded the bases on three singles before Pierre's go-ahead two-run double off Jason Christiansen made it 7–5 Marlins. Next inning, the Marlins loaded the bases on a single, Snow's error, and walk before Jeff Conine's groundout made it 8–5 Marlins. In the ninth, center fielder Marquis Grissom's error on Lee's fly ball with two on allowed another run to score off Jim Brower. The Marlins' 9–5 victory tied the series heading to Florida.

=== Game 3 ===
October 3, 2003 4:06 pm (EDT) at Pro Player Stadium in Miami Gardens, Florida 86 °F (30 °C), cloudy
Team	1	2	3	4	5	6	7	8	9	10	11	R	H	E
San Francisco	0	0	0	0	0	2	0	0	0	0	1	3	12	1
Florida	2	0	0	0	0	0	0	0	0	0	2	4	8	1
WP: Braden Looper (1–0) LP: Tim Worrell (0–1); Home runs: SF: None; FLA: Iván Rodríguez (1); Attendance: 61,488; Boxscore

In Game 3, Kirk Rueter faced Mark Redman. Eventual NLCS MVP Iván Rodríguez got the scoring started with a two-run home run in the bottom of the first. The game quieted down with Redman and Rueter dueling until the sixth. The Giants tied the game on a bases-loaded forceout by José Cruz followed by a pinch-hit RBI single by Pedro Feliz. In the top of the seventh, Marlins left fielder Jeff Conine robbed a home run. Both teams failed to score runs for the last three innings and the game moved to extra innings. The Giants took the lead in the eleventh. Rich Aurilia walked to lead off, and Álex González committed an error on what appeared to be a double play ground ball by Barry Bonds, allowing Bonds to reach first and Aurilia to advance to third. Edgardo Alfonso then hit an RBI single to put the Giants up 3-2. The Giants then loaded the bases with one out, but failed to score any more runs when Cruz hit into a forceout with Bonds out at the plate, and J.T. Snow grounded out. The Marlins would strike back in the bottom half off Giants closer Tim Worrell. Jeff Conine led off with a seemingly routine fly ball to right, but Cruz, San Francisco's Gold Glove right fielder, dropped the routine fly for an error. Gonzalez then walked to put men on first and second. Miguel Cabrera then bunted, and a great play from Worrell prevented him from reaching, but he moved the runners over. The Giants would counter by intentionally walking Juan Pierre to load the bases and set up a force out. It would work initially as Worrell was able to field Luis Castillo's grounder and get Conine out at the plate, but Rodríguez would hit a two-strike single to right field, scoring both González and Pierre to win the game.

=== Game 4 ===
October 4, 2003 1:06 pm (EDT) at Pro Player Stadium in Miami Gardens, Florida 88 °F (31 °C), cloudy
Team	1	2	3	4	5	6	7	8	9	R	H	E
San Francisco	0	1	0	0	0	4	0	0	1	6	9	2
Florida	0	1	2	2	0	0	0	2	X	7	12	0
WP: Carl Pavano (2–0) LP: Félix Rodríguez (0–1) Sv: Ugueth Urbina (1); Attendance: 65,464; Boxscore

In Game 4, Jerome Williams faced Dontrelle Willis. In the top of the second, a sacrifice fly by Yorvit Torrealba put the Giants out in front 1–0. However, Rich Aurilia's error on Jeff Conine's ground ball allowed Miguel Cabrera, who doubled to lead off, to score to tie the game in the bottom half. After Luis Castillo walked, a double by Iván Rodríguez gave the Marlins the lead in the third. Then Derrek Lee singled home Rodriguez to make it 3–1. That marked the end of the day for Williams. In the fourth, the Marlins took a commanding 5–1 lead on Cabrera's bases-loaded two-run single, but Willis ran into trouble in the top of the sixth. After two leadoff singles, Rich Aurilia's RBI double made it 5–2 Marlins. Then Barry Bonds's sacrifice fly made it 5–3. Edgardo Alfonzo doubled in a run to make it a one-run game. Willis was finished as well and Brad Penny came on in relief. He got the second out, but relinquished the lead when J. T. Snow singled home Alfonzo to tie the game. Both bullpens would keep the game quiet until the bottom of the eighth. Félix Rodríguez came on in relief for the Giants and after two quick outs, allowed a base hit and hit a batter to put two men on for Cabrera, who singled in two runs aided an error by the Giants. They now had a 7–5 lead going into the ninth. With Ugueth Urbina coming on to close, the Giants put together a quick rally. A leadoff double by pinch-hitter Neifi Perez and a base hit by Snow made it 7–6. Then Urbina got the next two outs. But Urbina hit Ray Durham to put Snow in scoring position and two on. Then, Snow tried to score on a single to left by Jeffrey Hammonds. Jeff Conine's throw was on target, and Ivan Rodriguez tagged Snow at the plate as Snow barreled into him. Rodriguez fell backwards and, as he rose, showed that he held on to the ball, preserving the Marlins win. The Marlins won the series three games to one. For the first time in postseason history, a series ended with the potential tying run thrown out at the plate, according to the Elias Sports Bureau.

=== Composite box ===
2003 NLDS (3–1): Florida Marlins over San Francisco Giants

Team	1	2	3	4	5	6	7	8	9	10	11	R	H	E
Florida Marlins	3	1	2	2	3	3	1	3	0	0	2	20	37	2
San Francisco Giants	1	1	0	4	1	6	0	1	1	0	1	16	32	7
Total attendance: 214,422 Average attendance: 53,606
