= 2003 National League Championship Series =

Major League Baseball playoff series

Team (Wins)	Managers	Season
Florida Marlins (4)	Jack McKeon	91–71 (.562), GB: 10
Chicago Cubs (3)	Dusty Baker	88–74 (.543), GA: 1
- Dates: October 7–15
- MVP: Iván Rodríguez (Florida)
- Umpires: Jerry Crawford (Games 1, 3–7), Chuck Meriwether, Fieldin Culbreth, Larry Vanover (Game 2), Mike Everitt, Larry Poncino, Mike Reilly

Broadcast
- Television: Fox
- TV announcers: Thom Brennaman, Steve Lyons, Al Leiter, and Josh Lewin
- Radio: ESPN
- Radio announcers: Dan Shulman and Dave Campbell
- NLDS: Chicago Cubs over Atlanta Braves (3–2); Florida Marlins over San Francisco Giants (3–1)

The 2003 National League Championship Series (NLCS) was a best-of-seven playoff series in Major League Baseball’s 2003 postseason pitted the third-seeded Chicago Cubs and the fourth-seeded Florida Marlins for the National League pennant. The Series began on October 7 and ended on October 15. The Cubs held home-field advantage by virtue of winning their division.

The Marlins came back from a 3–1 series deficit and won the series in seven games, advancing to the World Series against the New York Yankees, whom they defeated in six games.

== Background ==
The series is most remembered for events that unfolded in the top of the eighth inning of Game 6. Not having won a championship since 1908, the Cubs had just taken two out of the three games in Miami, with the final two games at Wrigley Field in Chicago. The Cubs also had their best two pitchers, Mark Prior and Kerry Wood, slated to start the final two games. With the Cubs leading 3–0 and just five outs away from their first World Series appearance since 1945, Steve Bartman, a fan, reached for the foul ball hit by Luis Castillo off Prior, preventing Cubs outfielder Moisés Alou from catching it. Castillo proceeded to walk and Prior and the Cubs never recovered from the incident. Aided by Castillo's walk and later an error by Cubs shortstop Alex Gonzalez on a potential double-play grounder, the Marlins went on to score eight runs in the inning and won the game 8–3. There were some odd events leading up to the disastrous 8th inning that many Cubs fans call bad omens of The Curse of the Billy Goat, which most notably include Bernie Mac (a lifelong fan of the crosstown White Sox) altering "Take Me Out to the Ball Game" from "root for the Cubbies" to "root for the champs, champs." The Marlins went on to win Game 7 and then to defeat the New York Yankees in the World Series.

== Summary ==
=== Chicago Cubs vs. Florida Marlins ===
Florida won the series, 4–3.

Game	Date	Score	Location	Time	Attendance
1	October 7	Florida Marlins – 9, Chicago Cubs – 8 (11)	Wrigley Field	3:44	39,567
2	October 8	Florida Marlins – 3, Chicago Cubs – 12	Wrigley Field	3:02	39,562
3	October 10	Chicago Cubs – 5, Florida Marlins – 4 (11)	Pro Player Stadium	4:16	65,115
4	October 11	Chicago Cubs – 8, Florida Marlins – 3	Pro Player Stadium	2:58	65,829
5	October 12	Chicago Cubs – 0, Florida Marlins – 4	Pro Player Stadium	2:42	65,279
6	October 14	Florida Marlins – 8, Chicago Cubs – 3	Wrigley Field	3:00	39,577
7	October 15	Florida Marlins – 9, Chicago Cubs – 6	Wrigley Field	3:11	39,574

== Game summaries ==
=== Game 1 ===
October 7, 2003 7:18 pm (CDT) at Wrigley Field in Chicago, Illinois 75 °F (24 °C), clear
Team	1	2	3	4	5	6	7	8	9	10	11	R	H	E
Florida	0	0	5	0	0	1	0	0	2	0	1	9	14	1
Chicago	4	0	0	0	0	2	0	0	2	0	0	8	11	1
WP: Ugueth Urbina (1–0) LP: Mark Guthrie (0–1) Sv: Braden Looper (1); Home runs: FLA: Iván Rodríguez (1), Miguel Cabrera (1), Juan Encarnación (1), Mike Lowell (1); CHC: Moisés Alou (1), Alex S. Gonzalez (1), Sammy Sosa (1); Attendance: 39,567; Boxscore

The Cubs struck first in Game 1 with a four-run first inning off Josh Beckett. Kenny Lofton drew a leadoff walk before scoring on Mark Grudzielanek's triple. One out later, Moisés Alou's home run made it 3−0. Aramis Ramírez then tripled before scoring on Alex Gonzalez's two-out double. The Marlins battered starter Carlos Zambrano with five runs in the third. Juan Pierre tripled with one out, then Luis Castillo walked before Iván Rodríguez's home run made it 4−3 Cubs. After Derrek Lee struck out, home runs by Miguel Cabrera and Juan Encarnación put the Marlins up 5−4. They made it 6−4 in the sixth on Jeff Conine's sacrifice fly with runners on second and third, but the Cubs tied it in the bottom of the inning on Gonzalez's home run after Randall Simon doubled with two outs. The Marlins loaded the bases in the ninth off Joe Borowski on a double, walk and Grudzielanek's error before Rodriguez's single scored two, but the Cubs tied it in the bottom of the inning on Sammy Sosa's two-run home run off Ugueth Urbina, forcing extra innings. Mike Lowell's leadoff home run in the 11th put the Marlins up 9−8 and Braden Looper retired the Cubs in order in the bottom half to give Florida a 1−0 series lead.

=== Game 2 ===
October 8, 2003 7:18 pm (CDT) at Wrigley Field in Chicago, Illinois 75 °F (24 °C), clear
Team	1	2	3	4	5	6	7	8	9	R	H	E
Florida	0	0	0	0	0	2	0	1	0	3	9	1
Chicago	2	3	3	0	3	1	0	0	X	12	16	1
WP: Mark Prior (1–0) LP: Brad Penny (0–1); Home runs: FLA: Derrek Lee (1), Miguel Cabrera (2); CHC: Sammy Sosa (2), Aramis Ramírez (1), Alex S. Gonzalez 2 (3); Attendance: 39,562; Boxscore

In Game 2, the Cubs loaded the bases in the first on a hit and two walks off Brad Penny when Randall Simon brought home two with a single to left. Next inning, Paul Bako hit a leadoff single, moved to score on a groundout, and scored on Kenny Lofton's single. One out later, Sammy Sosa homered to make it 5−0; his home run ball landed on top of a camera house in center field, some 495 feet (151 m) from home plate. Next inning, Aramis Ramírez hit a leadoff home run and after Simon doubled, Penny was relieved by Nate Bump, who got Alex Gonzalez to hit into a force out, but then allowed an RBI double to Bako. One out later, Lofton's RBI single made it 8−0 Cubs. In the fifth, Rick Helling allowed a leadoff double to Simon, then Gonzalez homered an out later to make it 10−0. Bako then walked, moved to second on a sacrifice bunt, then to third on Lofton's single before scoring on Mark Grudzielanek's double. Mark Prior pitched five shutout innings before allowing lead off home runs to Derrek Lee and Miguel Cabrera in the sixth. Gonzalez hit his second home run of the game in the bottom of the inning. The Marlins scored one run in the eighth on a bases-loaded double play from Juan Encarnación off Dave Veres as the Cubs' 12−3 blowout win tied the series heading to Florida.

=== Game 3 ===
October 10, 2003 8:18 pm (EDT) at Pro Player Stadium in Miami Gardens, Florida 79 °F (26 °C), cloudy
Team	1	2	3	4	5	6	7	8	9	10	11	R	H	E
Chicago	1	1	0	0	0	0	0	2	0	0	1	5	12	0
Florida	0	1	0	0	0	0	2	1	0	0	0	4	10	0
WP: Joe Borowski (1–0) LP: Michael Tejera (0–1) Sv: Mike Remlinger (1); Home runs: CHC: Randall Simon (1); FLA: None; Attendance: 65,115; Boxscore

Another back-and-forth affair, similar to Game 1, pitted Florida's Mark Redman against Chicago's ace Kerry Wood at Pro Player Stadium.

The Cubs jumped on top in the first inning, as they had done in the previous two games. Sammy Sosa drove in Kenny Lofton with a single. The Cubs plated another run in the second, when a single and a pair of walks were followed by a sacrifice fly by Wood. The Marlins got a run back in their half of the second when Alex Gonzalez doubled in Miguel Cabrera with two outs.

Other than the Marlins leaving the bases loaded in the fifth, Wood rolled through the middle innings. Redman, too, held strong until he was pinch-hit for in the seventh.

In the bottom of the 7th, the Marlins finally broke through. Gonzalez led off with a single, followed by a Mike Lowell walk. They were both sacrificed to second and third, and then Gonzalez scored the tying run on an RBI groundout by Luis Castillo. With two outs and Lowell at third, Iván Rodríguez singled through the right side to give Florida the lead and knocked Wood from the game, but the next inning, Randall Simon followed up a Tom Goodwin triple with a home run into the right-field stands off reliever Chad Fox. The Cubs had retaken the lead 4–3.

The Marlins tied the game at 4–4 in the bottom of the eighth against Kyle Farnsworth when Todd Hollandsworth grounded a hit through the left side of the infield to score Cabrera. Florida, however, stranded the bases loaded in the ninth and the game went into extra innings.

In the top of the 11th, Lofton singled with one out. Then the sparingly used Doug Glanville turned out to be the hero when he smoked a triple into the left-center field gap to drive in Lofton with the go-ahead run. Mike Remlinger retired the Marlins in the bottom half of the 11th to secure the 5–4 victory.

Down 2 games to 1, the defeat was a blow to the Marlins, who squandered several chances with runners in scoring position.

=== Game 4 ===
October 11, 2003 8:00 pm (EDT) at Pro Player Stadium in Miami Gardens, Florida 82 °F (28 °C), cloudy
Team	1	2	3	4	5	6	7	8	9	R	H	E
Chicago	4	0	2	1	0	0	1	0	0	8	8	0
Florida	0	0	0	0	2	0	0	1	0	3	6	1
WP: Matt Clement (1–0) LP: Dontrelle Willis (0–1); Home runs: CHC: Aramis Ramírez 2 (3); FLA: None; Attendance: 65,829; Boxscore

Aramis Ramírez hit a first inning grand-slam, the first in Cubs postseason history, after Dontrelle Willis allowed three walks. They added to their lead in the third when Ramírez hit a single to right with two on. After a walk loaded the bases, Willis was relieved by Rick Helling, who allowed an RBI single to Alex Gonzalez. Next inning, Kenny Lofton drew a leadoff walk, moved to second on a wild pitch and scored on Moisés Alou's two-out single. Matt Clement pitched four shutout innings before allowing singles to Miguel Cabrera and Jeff Conine in the fifth. Alex Gonzalez's ground out and Todd Hollandsworth's single scored a run each. Ramírez hit his second home run of the game off Nate Bump in the seventh. The Marlins scored their last run in the eighth when Lenny Harris drew a leadoff walk and scored on Iván Rodríguez's double off Kyle Farnsworth. The Cubs cruised to an 8–3 victory, putting them just one victory away from their first World Series in nearly 60 years. This 2003 victory turned out to be the last playoff game won by the Cubs for 12 years, a span of 9 consecutive losses until finally winning the National League Wild Card Game in 2015, as well as their last win in the NLCS until 2016.

=== Game 5 ===
October 12, 2003 4:35 pm (EDT) at Pro Player Stadium in Miami Gardens, Florida 89 °F (32 °C), cloudy
Team	1	2	3	4	5	6	7	8	9	R	H	E
Chicago	0	0	0	0	0	0	0	0	0	0	2	0
Florida	0	0	0	0	2	0	1	1	X	4	8	0
WP: Josh Beckett (1–0) LP: Carlos Zambrano (0–1); Home runs: CHC: None; FLA: Mike Lowell (2), Iván Rodríguez (2), Jeff Conine (1); Attendance: 65,279; Boxscore

With the Marlins facing elimination, Josh Beckett kept them alive by dominating the Cubs, holding them to just two hits and one walk as part of his standout 2003 postseason. The game was scoreless until the fifth inning when Mike Lowell hit a two-run homer off Carlos Zambrano. Iván Rodríguez and Jeff Conine homered in the seventh and eighth innings off Dave Veres and Mike Remlinger, respectively. Even with the loss, the Cubs looked strong going back home with their two aces, Mark Prior for Game 6 and Kerry Wood, if necessary, to start Game 7.

=== Game 6 ===
October 14, 2003 7:18 pm (CDT) at Wrigley Field in Chicago, Illinois 57 °F (14 °C), windy and cloudy
Team	1	2	3	4	5	6	7	8	9	R	H	E
Florida	0	0	0	0	0	0	0	8	0	8	9	0
Chicago	1	0	0	0	0	1	1	0	0	3	10	2
WP: Chad Fox (1–0) LP: Mark Prior (1–1); Attendance: 39,577; Boxscore

In Game 6, the Cubs struck first when Kenny Lofton singled to lead off the first off Carl Pavano and scored on Sammy Sosa's one-out double. In the sixth, after two singles and a double play put Sosa at third off Pavano, reliever Dontrelle Willis's ball four wild pitch to Eric Karros allowed Sosa to score. Next inning, Paul Bako hit a leadoff single and moved to second on a sacrifice bunt. After a strikeout, Willis was relieved by Chad Fox, who allowed an RBI single to Mark Grudzielanek.

With thousands of fans on the street outside sold-out Wrigley Field, poised to celebrate, the Cubs held a 3–0 lead going into the top of the eighth inning of Game 6. After Mike Mordecai hit a high pop fly to left fielder Moisés Alou, the team was a mere five outs away from their first World Series appearance since 1945.

Mark Prior had retired the last eight hitters and had allowed only three hits up to that point. Center fielder Juan Pierre then hit a double off Prior.

On the eighth pitch of his at bat, Luis Castillo hit a high foul ball toward the left field wall. Alou (a former Marlin who had won a world championship with the club in 1997) headed toward the stands to catch the ball for the potential second out. As Alou reached for the ball hit by his former teammate, Cubs fan Steve Bartman, along with others near the area, did the same. The ball bounced off Bartman's hands and into the stands. Though the Cubs pleaded for a call of fan interference, left field umpire Mike Everitt ruled that the ball had left the field of play and was therefore up for grabs. Alou, who was visibly angry at Bartman's catch, initially acknowledged that he would not have made the catch, but he later denied making such a statement and said if he had, it was only to make Bartman feel better.

As a result, Castillo remained an active batter at home plate. On the next pitch, Prior walked Castillo with a wild pitch that got away from catcher Paul Bako, also allowing Pierre to advance to third base.

At this point, the Marlins' bats began to come alive. Next, Iván Rodríguez hit an 0–2 pitch hard into left field, singling and scoring Pierre. Miguel Cabrera then hit a ground ball toward Cubs shortstop Alex Gonzalez that could have ended the inning on a double play. Gonzalez, who led all NL shortstops in fielding percentage, closed his glove too early and the ball landed in the dirt, allowing Cabrera to reach safely, loading the bases. On the next pitch, Derrek Lee (a future Cubs All-Star) drilled a double into left field, scoring Castillo and Rodríguez to tie the score at 3–3.

Prior was taken out of the game and replaced by Kyle Farnsworth, who intentionally walked Mike Lowell to load the bases again. Jeff Conine then hit a sacrifice fly to right field for the second out of the inning, allowing Cabrera to score from third and the other runners to each advance one base. This gave the Marlins their first lead of the night. Farnsworth intentionally walked Todd Hollandsworth (another future Cub) to yet again load the bases.

The Marlins now having batted around the order, Mordecai, making up for his earlier out, hit a bases-clearing double to left-center field, scoring Lee, Lowell, and Hollandsworth and making it a 7–3 Marlins lead.

Farnsworth was taken out of the game and replaced by Mike Remlinger, who gave up a single to Pierre to score Mordecai from second base. Castillo popped to shallow right field for the final out of an 8-run inning. The comeback victory by the Marlins forced a Game 7.

=== Game 7 ===
October 15, 2003 7:18 pm (CDT) at Wrigley Field in Chicago, Illinois 60 °F (16 °C), clear
Team	1	2	3	4	5	6	7	8	9	R	H	E
Florida	3	0	0	0	3	1	2	0	0	9	12	0
Chicago	0	3	2	0	0	0	1	0	0	6	6	0
WP: Brad Penny (1–1) LP: Kerry Wood (0–1) Sv: Ugueth Urbina (1); Home runs: FLA: Miguel Cabrera (3); CHC: Kerry Wood (1), Moisés Alou (2), Troy O'Leary (1); Attendance: 39,574; Boxscore

In Game 7, Juan Pierre tripled to lead off the first, then Iván Rodríguez walked with one out before Miguel Cabrera's home run made it 3–0 Marlins against Cubs ace Kerry Wood, who had not lost at Wrigley Field in nearly six weeks. The Cubs responded by tying the score 3–3 in the second inning off Mark Redman, which featured a two-run home run by Wood after Damian Miller hit into an RBI groundout with runners on second and third. Moisés Alou's two-run homer after a hit-by-pitch the following inning put Chicago up 5–3, but the lead would not last. In the fifth, Florida capitalized on a pair of walks and scored three runs on Rodriguez's double, Cabrera's groundout and Derrek Lee's single to go on top 6–5, a lead they would not relinquish. They added a run in the sixth on Luis Castillo's single with two on off Kyle Farnsworth and two more in the seventh on Alex Gonzalez's double with two on off Dave Veres to expand their lead to 9–5. Cubs pinch-hitter Troy O'Leary hit a home run in the seventh off Josh Beckett, making the score 9–6. After the Cubs were retired in order in the eighth, Florida closer Ugueth Urbina hit Aramis Ramírez with a pitch to lead off the ninth inning, but proceeded to retire the following three batters, giving the Marlins their second National League pennant in their 11-year existence, while leaving the Cubs once again empty-handed.

== Composite box ==
2003 NLCS (4–3): Florida Marlins over Chicago Cubs

Team	1	2	3	4	5	6	7	8	9	10	11	R	H	E
Florida Marlins	3	1	5	0	7	4	5	12	2	0	1	40	68	3
Chicago Cubs	12	7	7	1	3	4	3	2	2	0	1	42	65	4
Total attendance: 354,503 Average attendance: 50,643

== Series overview and aftermath ==
Chicago manager Dusty Baker, who won the NL pennant in 2002 with the San Francisco Giants, fell short in his bid to become the first manager ever to take two different teams to the World Series in consecutive years. He did not return to the LCS until 2020 or the World Series until 2021 with the Astros, by then his 5th team managed. With the Astros, he finally won a championship as a manager in 2022 at the age of 73.

Because of the two dramatic League Championship Series that both went to a seventh game, and a major upset in the World Series, the 2003 postseason was considered one of the most enthralling in MLB history. FOX won a Sports Emmy for Outstanding Live Sports Special for their coverage of the 2003 postseason, which along with the 2006 MLB postseason, are the only times the award has been given to a league's playoff in a team sport.

The Cubs were upset again by the Marlins during the 2020 Wild Card Series, losing the series in a two-game sweep.

=== Steve Bartman, the 2004 Cubs, and beyond ===
The Cubs implosion in Game 6 only added to the Curse of the Billy Goat lore. Steve Bartman was immediately labeled the reason for their implosion, as the team had a complete meltdown after Bartman reached out to catch a flyball in foul territory, disrupting Moises Alou's potential catch. In the moments following the play, Cubs' fans shouted insults and threw debris at Bartman. For his safety, security was forced to escort him from the ballpark.

Bartman's name, as well as personal information about him, appeared on Major League Baseball's online message boards minutes after the game ended. As many as six police cars gathered outside his home to protect Bartman and his family following the incident. Afterwards, then-Illinois Governor Rod Blagojevich suggested that Bartman join a witness protection program, while then-Florida Governor Jeb Bush offered Bartman asylum. In the years after the incident, Bartman would live in virtual anonymity. He declined interviews, sponsorships, and request for public appearances. In 2011, ESPN Films released “Catching Hell”, a documentary about Bartman’s memorable gaffe in the 2003 NLCS. However, like he did for other media opportunities, Bartman had no involvement with the project.

After the Cubs ended their 108-year drought and won the World Series in 2016, Steve Bartman's name once again came into focus as he received a championship ring from Cubs owner Tom Ricketts and the Ricketts family as a special gift on July 31, 2017. In his statement to the press, Bartman was relieved and hopeful that the saga of the 2003 foul ball incident surrounding himself and his family would finally be over.

Even in a competitive division such that of the National League Central, the Cubs figured to be back in the hunt for another shot at the pennant in 2004. The team brought back future Hall of Fame pitcher Greg Maddux (he previously pitched for Chicago from 1986–1992). Many thought his addition, to go along with young starting pitchers Mark Prior, Kerry Wood, and Carlos Zambrano, would help resemble the Maddux-led Braves' rotations in the 1990s. However, Prior and Wood both took steps backwards, as they continued to be hampered by injury. In the division, the St. Louis Cardinals raced off to the division lead and eventual NL Central title, finishing with an MLB's best 105 wins. The Cubs faltered down the stretch and were eventually overtaken in the division and the wild card standings by a surging Houston Astros team in late September. Despite having a better record than the 2003 team, the 2004 Cubs were considered one of the most disappointing teams in franchise history due to not being able to qualify for a postseason spot.

2003 Marlins Juan Pierre and Derrek Lee would eventually become Cubs after being traded in two separate trades before the start of the 2005 season. Pierre was just in Chicago for a year, but Derrek Lee became a mainstay and a fan favorite with the team. Lee put up MVP-type numbers in 2005, finishing third that year in the award, while leading the National League batting average and slugging. He also won the gold glove and silver slugger awards at first base, being the only Cubs first baseman to accomplish this feat until Anthony Rizzo did it in 2016.

Kerry Wood and Mark Prior never truly regained their form from 2003. After years of battling arm injuries, Prior would pitch his last game in MLB in 2006. Wood suffered similar arm issues and had to move to the bullpen in 2008, where he would find some success as the Cubs closer and later Yankees set-up reliever to Mariano Rivera. Wood retired in 2012 at the age of 35. Prior eventually reached the World Series as a bullpen coach for the Dodgers in 2018 and he later won three championships as their pitching coach in 2020, 2024, and 2025.

== See also ==
- Curse of the Billy Goat
- Steve Bartman incident
