= Steve Bartman incident =

2003 baseball game play in Chicago, US

Coordinates: 41.948672°N 87.655978°W

Fan Steve Bartman and Moisés Alou both attempt to catch the foul ball

The Steve Bartman incident was a controversial play that occurred during a baseball game between the Chicago Cubs and the Florida Marlins on October 14, 2003, at Wrigley Field in Chicago, Illinois, during Major League Baseball's (MLB) 2003 postseason. The play involved multiple spectators attempting to catch a fly ball and potentially affecting the outcome of the game.

The incident occurred in Game 6 of the National League Championship Series (NLCS), with Chicago leading 3–0 in the eighth inning and holding a three-games-to-two lead in the best-of-seven series. Marlins batter Luis Castillo hit a fly ball into foul territory in left field. Cubs outfielder Moisés Alou attempted to make the catch near the wall, but multiple Cubs fans reached for the ball and Steve Bartman deflected it. The umpire judged the play not to be fan interference. (If the play was found to be fan interference, Castillo would have been called out.) If Alou had caught the ball, it would have been the second out in the inning, and the Cubs would have been just four outs away from winning their first National League pennant since 1945. Alou showed displeasure at the ball not being catchable due to home fan interference, throwing his glove to the ground.

Following the ruling of no interference, the Cubs' defense collapsed. On the very next pitch, Mark Prior threw a wild pitch to walk Castillo and allow Juan Pierre to reach third base. After a run-scoring single by Ivan Rodriguez to cut the Cubs' lead to 3–1, Cubs shortstop Alex Gonzalez mishandled a ground ball by Miguel Cabrera that could have resulted in an inning-ending double play. The Cubs ultimately allowed eight runs in the inning and lost the game 8–3. They also lost Game 7 at Wrigley Field the following day and were eliminated by the Marlins.

In the moments following the play, Cubs fans shouted insults and threw debris at Bartman. For his safety, Wrigley security was forced to escort him from the ballpark. Minutes after the game, his name and personal information were published online, necessitating police protection at his home. He faced further harassment, including four death threats, from fans and the media after the Cubs' loss in the series. Bartman apologized for the incident and stated his desire to move past it and return to a quiet life. Many Cubs players came to his defense, emphasizing that their performance was to blame for their loss. To compensate Bartman for his treatment, the Cubs sent him a championship ring after the team's victory in the 2016 World Series 13 years later.

In 2011 ESPN released an original documentary on the incident called "Catching Hell".

== Incident ==
The incident occurred on October 14, 2003, at Wrigley Field, during Game 6 of the National League Championship Series (NLCS), which matched the Chicago Cubs against the Florida Marlins. At the time of the incident, Cubs pitcher Mark Prior had allowed only three hits and no runs entering the eighth inning. The Cubs led the game 3–0 and the best-of-seven series three games to two. They were five outs away from reaching the World Series for the first time since 1945; the Cubs had not been baseball's champions since 1908. Luis Castillo was at bat for the Marlins with one out and a full count, with teammate Juan Pierre on second base.

Cubs fan Steve Bartman was sitting in the front row along the left field corner wall behind the on-field bullpen when a pop foul off the bat of Castillo drifted toward his seat. Cubs left fielder Moisés Alou approached the wall, jumped, and reached for the ball. Bartman was one of several fans who attempted to catch the ball. As Bartman attempted to catch the ball, his hand slapped the ball, deflecting it away from Alou's glove. Alou slammed his glove down in frustration and shouted at several fans. The Cubs, in particular Alou and Prior, argued for fan interference, but umpire Mike Everitt ruled there was no interference because the ball had broken the plane of the wall separating the field of play from the stands and entered the stands.

Cubs manager Dusty Baker did not see the play as it happened, because the curvature of the Cubs dugout blocked his view.

In the Marlins' dugout after the Bartman play, pitcher Mark Redman, who was scheduled to start Game 7 if the Marlins won, told his teammates "Let's make that guy famous."

Everitt's ruling has been heavily scrutinized over the years. For example, the authors of Mad Ball: The Bartman Play argue that photographs show Bartman's arms extending into the playing field and that Castillo should have been called out because interference prevented a catch.

On Fox, commentator Thom Brennaman said "Again in the air, down the left field line. Alou... reaching into the stands... and couldn't get it and he's livid with a fan!"

== Aftermath ==
=== For the Cubs and Marlins ===
Following the incident, the Marlins scored eight runs:

1. Continuing his at bat, Castillo drew a walk. Ball four was a wild pitch from Prior, which allowed Juan Pierre, who doubled before Castillo came to bat, to advance to third base.
2. Iván Rodríguez, on an 0–2 pitch, singled to drive in the first run of the inning, making the score 3–1.
3. Miguel Cabrera hit a ground ball to Alex Gonzalez, who misfielded the ball. Had Gonzalez fielded the ball, the Cubs could have either ended the half-inning with a double play, still ahead by two runs, or at least added the second out. Instead, all runners were safe and the bases were loaded.
4. Derrek Lee doubled, tying the score and chasing Prior from the game.
5. Relief pitcher Kyle Farnsworth issued an intentional walk to Mike Lowell, then gave up a sacrifice fly to Jeff Conine, giving the Marlins a 4–3 lead. Cubs right fielder Sammy Sosa missed the cut-off man, allowing Lowell to move up to second base. The Cubs issued another intentional walk to Todd Hollandsworth, which again loaded the bases.
6. A bases-clearing double from Mike Mordecai, who led-off the half-inning, broke the game open, making the score 7–3.
7. Mike Remlinger replaced Farnsworth and Pierre singled to put the Marlins ahead 8–3.
8. Finally, Luis Castillo, whose foul popup had initiated the controversy, popped out to second to end the inning. The Marlins had sent twelve batters to the plate and scored eight runs. The Marlins won the game 8–3.

The next night, back at Wrigley Field, the Marlins overcame Kerry Wood and a 5–3 deficit to win 9–6 and win the pennant. The Marlins went on to win the World Series, defeating the heavily favored New York Yankees in six games.

=== For Bartman ===
Bartman remained seated as Fox repeatedly alternated between broadcasting live shots of him with multiple instant replays of the foul ball. The somber image of Bartman wearing a Cubs baseball cap, glasses, headset, and green turtleneck shirt became memorable. Because there were no video replay screens at Wrigley Field at the time, Bartman was not widely recognized until many of the attendees' friends and family members, who were watching the game on television, started calling them on cell phones, informing them of Bartman and his appearance. After Rodriguez’s at bat ended with the Marlins scoring their first run, many Cubs fans began pointing at Bartman, repeatedly chanting "asshole". Bartman had to be led away from the park under security escort for his own safety, as many Cubs fans shouted insults and threats at him (some of which were death threats), while others threw things, with one fan dumping a cup of beer on him. Security escorted Bartman and two people who accompanied him to the game towards the exit tunnel from the field. News footage of the game showed him surrounded by security as fans pelted him with drinks and other debris. Bartman's name, as well as personal information about him, appeared on Major League Baseball's online message boards minutes after the game ended. As many as six police cars gathered outside his home in Northbrook, Illinois, to protect Bartman and his family following the incident. Afterwards, then-Illinois Governor Rod Blagojevich suggested that Bartman join a witness protection program, while then-Florida Governor Jeb Bush offered Bartman asylum. A resort in Pompano Beach also offered Bartman an all-expenses-paid three-month vacation.

After the incident, Bartman released a statement, saying he was "truly sorry". He added "I had my eyes glued on the approaching ball the entire time and was so caught up in the moment that I did not even see Moisés Alou, much less that he may have had a play." Trying to maintain a low profile, Bartman declined interviews, endorsement deals, and requests for public appearances, and his family changed their phone number to avoid harassing phone calls. He requested that any gifts sent to him by Florida Marlins fans be donated to the Juvenile Diabetes Research Foundation. In July 2008, Bartman was offered $25,000 to autograph a picture of himself at the National Sports Collectors Convention in Rosemont, but he refused the offer. He declined to appear as a VIP at Wrigley Field. In 2011, eight years after the incident, he declined to appear in the ESPN documentary "Catching Hell", and he declined a six-figure offer to appear in a Super Bowl commercial.

Many fans associated the Bartman incident with the Curse of the Billy Goat, allegedly laid on the Cubs during the 1945 World Series after Billy Sianis and his pet goat were ejected from Wrigley Field. The Cubs lost that series to the Detroit Tigers in seven games and did not return to the World Series until 2016. Bartman was also compared to the black cat that ran across Shea Stadium near an on-deck Ron Santo during a September 9, 1969, regular season game between the Cubs and the New York Mets. The Cubs were in first place at the time, but after the cat appeared, the Cubs lost the game and eventually fell eight games behind the Mets in the standings, missing that season's playoffs. Fans further believed that they had been jinxed an inning before the incident, when comedian Bernie Mac sang "Take Me Out to the Ball Game" during the seventh-inning stretch. In the Cubs' version of the song, the lyric "home team" is replaced with "Cubbies". However, Mac, a lifelong fan of the Cubs' crosstown rival, the White Sox, replaced the lyric with "champs, champs" instead to "motivate [the Cubs] in a comedic way". On Fox, coming off a commercial break after the Marlins had tied the game as Lowell was being intentionally walked, Thom Brennaman said of the incident, as well as the Marlins' subsequent rally: "It's safe to say that every Cubs fan has to be wondering right now, is the Curse of the Billy Goat alive and well?"

=== Destruction of the Bartman ball ===
Remains of the ball

The loose ball was snatched up by a Chicago lawyer and sold at an auction in December 2003. Grant DePorter purchased it for $113,824.16 on behalf of Harry Caray's Restaurant Group. On February 26, 2004, it was publicly detonated by special effects expert Michael Lantieri.

In 2005, the remains of the ball were used by the restaurant in a pasta sauce. While no part of the ball itself was in the sauce, the ball was boiled and the steam captured, distilled, and added to the final concoction.

Today, the remains of the ball are on display at the Chicago Sports Museum, while further remains are amid various artifacts at the restaurant itself.

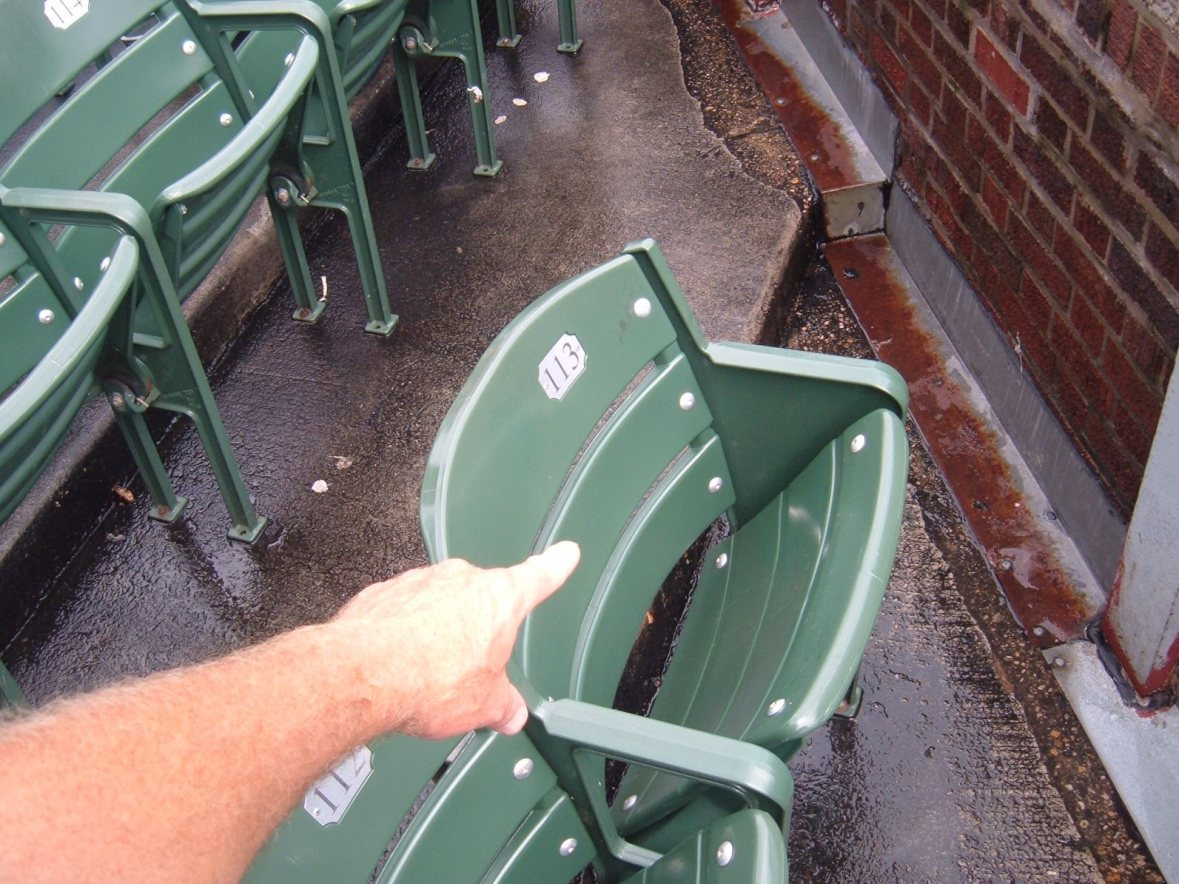
Steve Bartman's seat, aisle 4, row 8, seat 113

=== The Bartman seat ===
In the years following the incident, the seat Bartman sat in—aisle 4, row 8, seat 113—became a tourist attraction at Wrigley Field. When the lower grandstands were reconfigured before the 2017 season, that seat number was changed. It was changed to section 2, row 8, seat 108. Before the 2019 season, more reconfiguration was done to the seats with the seat Bartman sat in once again being changed. It is now currently section 3, row 12, seat 1.

=== Moisés Alou ===
In April 2008, Moisés Alou was quoted by the Associated Press as saying "You know what the funny thing is? I wouldn't have caught it, anyway." Alou later disputed that story, however: "I don't remember that," he said to a writer from The Palm Beach Post. "If I said that, I was probably joking to make [Bartman] feel better. But I don't remember saying that." Alou added "It's time to forgive the guy and move on."

In the 2011 documentary Catching Hell, Alou states "I'm convinced 100% that I had that ball in my glove."

== Defense of Bartman ==
After the incident, the Cubs issued the following press release:

The Chicago Cubs would like to thank our fans for their tremendous outpouring of support this year. We are very grateful.

We would also like to remind everyone that games are decided by what happens on the playing field – not in the stands. It is inaccurate and unfair to suggest that an individual fan is responsible for the events that transpired in Game 6. He did what every fan who comes to the ballpark tries to do – catch a foul ball in the stands. That's one of the things that makes baseball the special sport that it is.

This was an exciting season and we're looking forward to working towards an extended run of October baseball at Wrigley Field.

Several Cubs players publicly absolved Bartman of blame. Mark Prior said "We had chances to get out of that situation. I hung an 0–2 curveball to [Ivan] Rodriguez that he hit for a single. Alex Gonzalez, who's a sure thing almost at shortstop, the ball came up on him... and things just snowballed. Everybody in the clubhouse and management knows that play is not the reason we lost the game." Former Cubs pitcher Rick Sutcliffe said that the crowd's reactions to Bartman "crushed [him]". "Right after I saw what happened with the fan, I woke up the next morning and told my wife that if the Cubs asked me to throw out the first pitch in the World Series, I was going to take that fan out to the mound with me," he said. Baseball commissioner Bud Selig also came to Bartman's defense, telling an interviewer "[W]hile I understand that people felt so strongly and that their hearts were just breaking, to blame this young man, who is the most devoted Cub fan... it's just unfair. When I read his statement, it broke my heart. ... If you want to blame the Curse of the Bambino and the goat in Chicago or a series of other things, that's fine. But blaming Steve Bartman is just not right."

Several of Bartman's friends and family members spoke out in the days following the incident. His father told the Chicago Sun-Times "He's a huge Cubs fan. I'm sure I taught him well. I taught him to catch foul balls when they come near him." A neighbor added "He's a good kid, a wonderful son, never in any trouble. I don't think he should be blamed at all. People reach for balls. This just happened to be a little more critical. If Florida didn't score all the runs, you wouldn't be standing here." Bartman was also supported by players for the Niles Renegades, a youth baseball team he coached, and whose jersey he was wearing during Game 6.

Sun-Times sports columnist Jay Mariotti wrote "A fan in that situation should try his best to get out of the way, even if he isn't of the mind to see Alou approaching, as Bartman claims. Still, he's also a human being who was reacting in a tense, unusual moment. And the resulting verbal abuse and trash-hurling, followed by the Neanderthal threats and creepy reaction on the Internet, hasn't reflected well on Chicago's sports culture. As it is, everyone thinks the prototypical local fans are those mopes from the Superfans skits on Saturday Night Live."

In a 2011 interview on ESPN's Pardon the Interruption, Cubs President Theo Epstein expressed a desire for the team to reach out to Bartman. "From afar, it seems like it would be an important step. Maybe a cathartic moment that would allow people to move forward together. I'm all about having an open mind, an open heart and forgiveness. Those are good characteristics for an organization to have as well. He's a Cubs fan. That's the most important thing," said Epstein.

In 2012, former Cubs player Doug Glanville said "[I]t was easy to look at Steve Bartman [...] But that was not the whole story by a long shot." He argued that the Cubs lost the momentum of the series when Marlins ace Josh Beckett shut down the Cubs in Game 5. Glanville drew parallels between that game and Barry Zito's game-winning performance in Game 5 of the 2012 NLCS.

== 2016 Cubs victory in World Series ==
During the 2016 season, Bartman received renewed media attention as the Cubs progressed through the playoffs. On Saturday, October 22, 2016, the Cubs were again at home with a 3–2 lead in Game 6 of the NLCS, similar to the 2003 NLCS game. The Cubs ended up winning the National League Championship Series and ending the Curse of the Billy Goat. In a surprising turn of events, a foul ball in the final inning fell near the area Bartman had sat in, prompting shouts of "Don't touch it" from the crowd, though this foul ball fell well out of play. After winning the pennant, many Cubs fans petitioned for the team to allow Bartman to throw out a first pitch during the 2016 World Series. Nonetheless, Bartman's spokesman Frank Murtha told CNN that Bartman did not want to be in the spotlight, and that there is "probably a slim, none, and no chance" that Bartman would agree to throw out a first pitch.

On November 2, 2016, the Chicago Cubs won the World Series for the first time since 1908. Through Murtha, Bartman congratulated the Cubs in their World Series championship. Murtha said "[Bartman] was just overjoyed that the Cubs won, as all the Cubs fans are." Further, when calls were made for Bartman to be a part of the victory parade, or other similar ideas "The one thing that Steve and I did talk about was if the Cubs were to win, he did not want to be a distraction to the accomplishments of the players and the organization."

MLB.com and ESPN have both reported that Cubs owner Tom Ricketts had expressed interest in contacting Bartman for closure "at the right time". Later on, Cubs president Theo Epstein stated that Bartman is "welcome to come back" but at his own discretion and that he should be left alone. Bartman received a championship ring from the Ricketts family as a special gift on July 31, 2017. The Cubs said in a statement "We hope this provides closure on an unfortunate chapter of the story that has perpetuated throughout our quest to win a long-awaited World Series. While no gesture can fully lift the public burden he has endured for more than a decade, we felt it was important Steve knows he has been and continues to be fully embraced by this organization. After all he has sacrificed, we are proud to recognize Steve Bartman with this gift today."

Bartman released a statement, saying:

Although I do not consider myself worthy of such an honor, I am deeply moved and sincerely grateful to receive an official Chicago Cubs 2016 World Series Championship ring. I am fully aware of the historical significance and appreciate the symbolism the ring represents on multiple levels. My family and I will cherish it for generations. Most meaningful is the genuine outreach from the Ricketts family, on behalf of the Cubs organization and fans, signifying to me that I am welcomed back into the Cubs family and have their support going forward. I am relieved and hopeful that the saga of the 2003 foul ball incident surrounding my family and me is finally over. I humbly receive the ring not only as a symbol of one of the most historic achievements in sports, but as an important reminder for how we should treat each other in today's society. My hope is that we all can learn from my experience to view sports as entertainment and prevent harsh scapegoating, and to challenge the media and opportunistic profiteers to conduct business ethically by respecting personal privacy rights and not exploit any individual to advance their own self-interest or economic gain. Moreover, I am hopeful this ring gesture will be the start of an important healing and reconciliation process for all involved. To that end, I request the media please respect my privacy, and the privacy of my family. I will not participate in interviews or further public statements at this time. Words alone cannot express my heartfelt thanks to the Ricketts family, Crane Kenney, Theo Epstein, and the entire Cubs organization for this extraordinary gift, and for providing the City of Chicago and Cubs fans everywhere an unforgettable World Championship in 2016. I am happy to be reunited with the Cubs family and positively moving forward with my life.

== In popular culture ==
In the pilot episode of The Bear, the rap song "Don't Blame Steve" by Serengeti, which recounts an alternate history exculpating Bartman for the Steve Bartman incident, is used.

In a season two episode of The Bear, "Omelette", Jimmy Kalinowski (Oliver Platt) and Carmy Berzatto (Jeremy Allen White) have a conversation about the game, with Jimmy using the incident as an example of misbegotten scapegoating.

== See also ==
- Jeffrey Maier incident – a similar fan incident during a 1996 American League Championship Series game
- Sunderland A.F.C. 1–0 Liverpool F.C. (2009) – incident in which a Liverpool soccer fan launched a beach ball onto the field, causing a deflection that cost his team the game
- List of nicknamed MLB games and plays
