= Randall Simon =

American baseball player (born 1975)

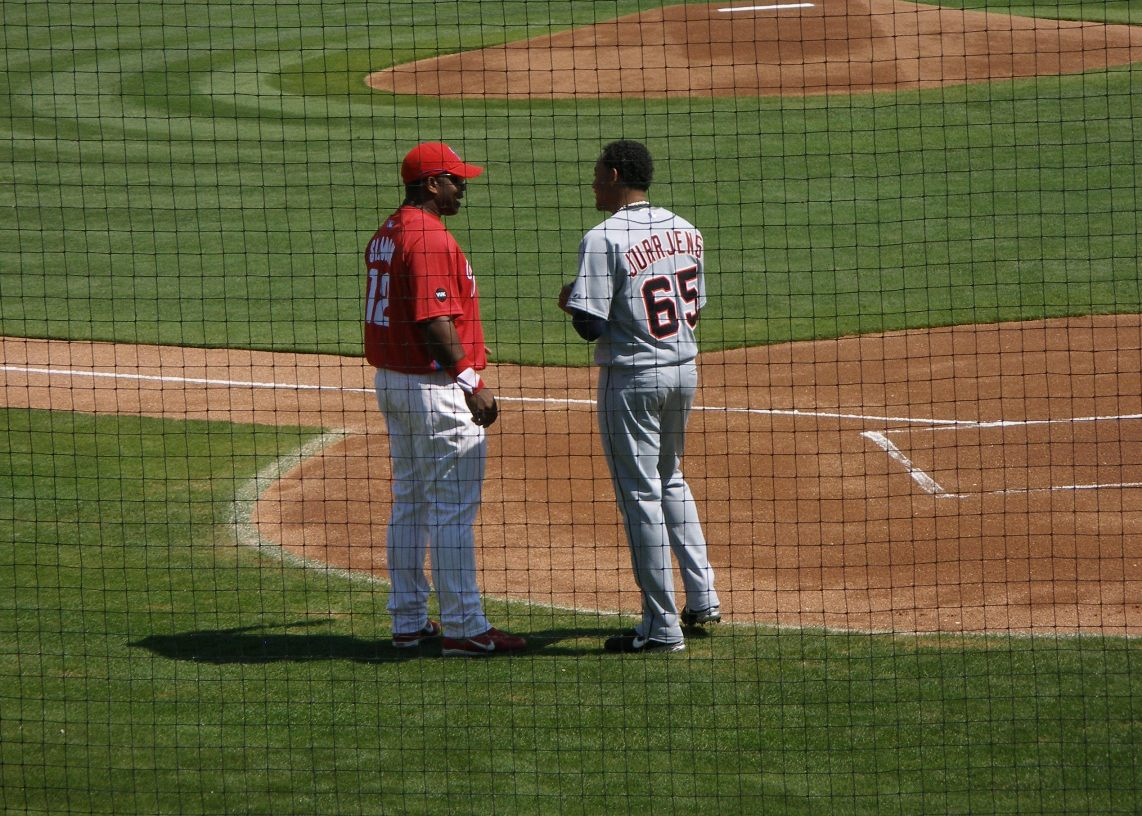
- Simon (left) and Jair Jurrjens on March 11, 2007
- First baseman
- Born: May 25, 1975 (age 51); Willemstad, Curaçao
- Batted: Left Threw: Left

Professional debut
- MLB: September 1, 1997, for the Atlanta Braves
- NPB: July 2, 2005, for the Orix Buffaloes

Last appearance
- NPB: September 7, 2005, for the Orix Buffaloes
- MLB: September 30, 2006, for the Philadelphia Phillies

MLB statistics
- Batting average: .283
- Home runs: 49
- Runs batted in: 237

NPB statistics
- Batting average: .213
- Home runs: 0
- Runs batted in: 2
- Stats at Baseball Reference

Teams
- Atlanta Braves (1997–1999); Detroit Tigers (2001–2002); Pittsburgh Pirates (2003); Chicago Cubs (2003); Pittsburgh Pirates (2004); Tampa Bay Devil Rays (2004); Orix Buffaloes (2005); Philadelphia Phillies (2006)

Randall Carlito Simon (born May 25, 1975) is a Curaçaoan former professional baseball first baseman. He has played all or parts of eight seasons in Major League Baseball (MLB), LVBP and one in Nippon Professional Baseball (NPB) between 1997 and 2006. Simon's debut season came with the Atlanta Braves in 1997, for whom he played until 1999. He also played for the Detroit Tigers (2001–2002), Pittsburgh Pirates (2003, 2004), Chicago Cubs (2003), Tampa Bay Devil Rays (2004), the NPB's Orix Buffaloes (2005), Texas Rangers (2006) Philadelphia Phillies (2006–2007). He also played in the Northern League for the Gary SouthShore RailCats in 2010 and Rockford RiverHawks in 2011.

== Playing career ==
Simon was born in Willemstad, Curaçao. Before signing with the Pirates, Simon signed with the Florida Marlins and New York Yankees in the 2000 season, but did not play in the majors for either franchise. In 2003, Simon was traded by Pittsburgh to the Chicago Cubs, where he had a productive postseason, helping the Cubs to the 2003 National League Championship Series. After the season, Simon was released by Chicago.

On February 19, 2004, the Pittsburgh Pirates signed Simon as a free agent to secure the team at first base for the upcoming season. After several months into his second tenure with the Pirates, he was released on August 18, 2004. Simon said, "I'm a fighter," Simon said. "I promise you're going to see me again. You don't have to worry about that."

One day after his release from the Pirates, he was acquired by the Tampa Bay Devil Rays. After less than a month with Tampa Bay he was released and signed with the Orix Buffaloes of the Japanese Pacific League.

Randall represented his country in the 2006 World Baseball Classic for Netherlands along with his fellow country man and old teammate Andruw Jones who he played with the Atlanta Braves.

In 2008, Simon played for the independent Newark Bears of the Atlantic League.

In 2009, Simon played in the World Baseball Classic on the team representing the Netherlands.

The Fargo-Moorhead RedHawks of the Northern League signed Simon to a contract for the 2009 season.

Simon played for the Truenos de Tijuana of the Northern Mexican League (Liga Norte de Mexico) in the 2011 season, which ended on July 17, 2011.

== Coaching career ==
On March 4, 2024, Simon was hired by the Toros de Tijuana of the Mexican League to serve as an assistant batting coach.

== Sausage race incident ==
On July 9, 2003, while playing for the Pittsburgh Pirates, during the Milwaukee Brewers' "Sausage Race," in which four contestants wearing sausage costumes have a footrace on the field, Simon leaned over the dugout railing and hit college student Mandy Block (in the Italian sausage costume) with a bat, causing her to fall into the path of another racer. His bat struck only the top padded part of the costume, well above her head position, causing her to lose her balance. Block suffered only a scraped knee. Simon was questioned by police and later fined $432.10 for disorderly conduct. MLB suspended him for three games and fined him $2,000. He issued an apology to Block and sent her the bat, autographed, from the incident. When Simon returned to Miller Park later that year as a member of the Chicago Cubs (for reasons unrelated to the incident), he purchased Italian sausages for an entire section, and during the race, his teammates playfully held him back until all the sausages passed the dugout, while manager Dusty Baker guarded the bat rack.

Mandy Block, who Simon knocked down and by then known by her married name Mandy Wagner, stated in a 2021 interview that she found the incident "hilarious" and avoided most publicity related to it, feeling uncomfortable with the media narrative that she considered to be criminalizing Simon. Block received a complimentary trip for two persons to Curaçao, Simon's home island, from the Curaçao Tourism Board; she traveled there with her mother in March 2004.

== Citations ==
1. ESPN "Sausagegate"
2. ESPN: Your Turn "Sports Arrests"
