= Mike Mordecai =

American baseball player and coach (born 1967)

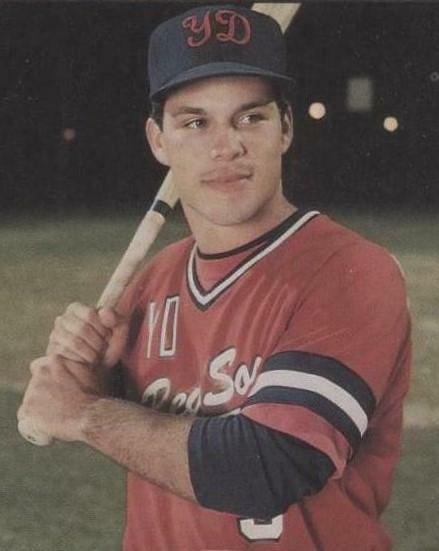
- Infielder / Coach
- Born: December 13, 1967 (age 58); Birmingham, Alabama, U.S.
- Batted: Right Threw: Right

MLB debut
- May 8, 1994, for the Atlanta Braves

Last MLB appearance
- September 21, 2005, for the Florida Marlins

MLB statistics
- Batting average: .244
- Home runs: 24
- Runs batted in: 132
- Stats at Baseball Reference

Teams
- Atlanta Braves (1994–1997); Montreal Expos (1998–2002); Florida Marlins (2002–2005)

Career highlights and awards
- 2× World Series champion (1995, 2003)

Michael Howard Mordecai (born December 13, 1967) is an American former professional baseball infielder, who played for the Atlanta Braves, Montreal Expos, and Florida Marlins of Major League Baseball (MLB). Since 2010, he has worked in the Toronto Blue Jays organization, including serving as the Blue Jays' quality control coach in 2018. He is currently the new head baseball coach at Houston Academy in Dothan, AL.

== School and minor leagues ==
Mordecai graduated in 1986 from Hewitt-Trussville High School, in Trussville, Alabama, where he played baseball, basketball and football. During his time in college at the University of South Alabama, he was a two-time All-American and named to the All-Sun Belt Conference team each year. In 1987, he helped the Jaguars to the conference title. Mordecai majored in criminal justice and minored in sociology. In 1988, he played collegiate summer baseball in the Cape Cod Baseball League for the Yarmouth-Dennis Red Sox.

With their sixth round selection of the 1989 Major League Baseball draft, the Atlanta Braves drafted Mordecai. He began his minor league career at Class A Burlington and eventually worked his way up to Greenville. In 1992, he made his way to Triple-A Richmond on June 19. In 1993, he was selected as Richmond's Most Competitive Player. He played every defensive position with the exception of center field and pitcher that season.

== Professional career ==
=== Atlanta Braves ===
In 1994, Mordecai made it to the majors but only for four at bats. His first tour was from May 3–20 for the Atlanta Braves, when he replaced Jeff Blauser on the roster. Mordecai's first hit was a three-run home run in the ninth inning against the Philadelphia Phillies. Mordecai continued to torment the Phillies throughout his career. He received the John M. Zwack III Memorial Award for being the most community-minded player.

Mordecai played on the 1995 World Series team as a bench player. He made his first start at second on July 16 at San Diego. In the NLDS he went 2-for-3 with a double and 2 RBI. His pinch-hit single in the ninth inning of Game 2 gave the Braves the go-ahead run. In the World Series, he went 1-for-3.

Unfortunately for Mordecai, the Braves had Mark Lemke at second base, Chipper Jones at third and Fred McGriff at first preventing him from getting more than a reserve role with the team. Mordecai was the Braves' starting third baseman on opening day 1996, though only because Chipper Jones was on the DL with an injury. On August 30, he collected the first three-hit game of his career at Chicago.

=== Montreal Expos ===
Mordecai's inability to stay consistent while a member of the Braves frustrated the front office and, in 1998, he joined the Montreal Expos. Mordecai made 53 starts the next year. He then enjoyed his best seasons there in 2000 and 2001. On April 2, 2001, Mordecai demonstrated his versatility by playing catcher in the tenth inning of a game against the Cubs after Montreal's first catcher, Michael Barrett, was ejected and their second catcher, Sandy Martínez, was injured.

=== Florida Marlins ===
In the midst of the 2002 trade deadline he was traded to the Florida Marlins. His statistics for the season drastically improved after the trade. The following season, he was again a key part in helping the inexperienced Marlins win the 2003 World Series. In Game 6 of the NLCS, the Marlins were five outs away from being eliminated when Cubs fan, Steve Bartman, prevented a foul ball from being potentially caught by extending his arms over Moisés Alou while Alou attempted to field the pop-up. Mordecai's subsequent three-run double blew the game open, highlighting the Cubs' historic collapse in what is sometimes referred to as simply "The Inning". Mordecai would go on to win his second World Series, as the Marlins handily defeated the Yankees in the World Series.

On June 1, 2004, Mordecai again filled the role as emergency catcher, this time for eight innings after Ramón Castro was injured. On September 29 2004 Mordecai while playing third base caught the final out of the Montreal Expos final home game preserving a 9-1 Marlins win over the Expos

Mordecai took a job as manager with the Marlins minor league affiliate Jamestown Jammers in December 2004. A few days later, the team announced that they would give him a chance to join the team in September so he could reach ten years of Major League service. Mordecai played two games in 2005 before retiring for good. Mordecai also worked as a batting coach for MLB before turning to coaching for a private High School in Dothan, Alabama. The school in Dothan is Houston Academy. His last high school game was against the Leroy Bears on the road in the first round of the Alabama State High School Playoffs in 2009.

== Coaching ==
In 2010, Mordecai was hired by the Toronto Blue Jays as a minor league infield coordinator. In 2015, he was promoted to coordinator of instruction, and on January 10, 2018, Mordecai was promoted to the quality control coach position. In 2019, Mordecai was once again reassigned within the Blue Jays organization, to his position as manager of the New Hampshire Fisher Cats. Mordecai currently works at Northside Methodist Academy, where he is the athletic director, coaches baseball, and teaches history.

== Personal life ==
Mordecai was married on February 5, 2000, to his second wife, Jennifer. Later that year, she gave birth to the first of their three sons. He also has a daughter, Taylor, born in 1995 from a first marriage.
