= Alex Gonzalez (shortstop, born 1973) =

American baseball player

- Shortstop
- Born: April 8, 1973 (age 53); Miami, Florida, U.S.
- Batted: Right Threw: Right

MLB debut
- April 4, 1994, for the Toronto Blue Jays

Last MLB appearance
- May 20, 2006, for the Philadelphia Phillies

MLB statistics
- Batting average: .243
- Home runs: 137
- Runs batted in: 536
- Stats at Baseball Reference

Teams
- Toronto Blue Jays (1994–2001); Chicago Cubs (2002–2004); Montreal Expos (2004); San Diego Padres (2004); Tampa Bay Devil Rays (2005); Philadelphia Phillies (2006)

Alexander Scott Gonzalez (born April 8, 1973) is an American former Major League Baseball infielder, who spent the majority of his 13-year career with the Toronto Blue Jays. Gonzalez established a career-high with 20 home runs for the Chicago Cubs in 2003 and hit 20 or more doubles eight times. He was regarded as a glove-first player, sporting a lower-than-average batting average (career .243 hitter), on-base percentage (.302), and OPS (.694) while leading the American league twice in fielding percentage. At Killian High School in Miami, Florida, Gonzalez was an All-State pick in baseball as a senior. He was drafted straight out of high school in the 14th round of the 1991 Major League Baseball draft by the Blue Jays. He is Cuban-American and was nicknamed "Gonzo" in order to tell the difference between him and the other Alex Gonzalez, who signed with the Blue Jays on November 26, 2009; coincidentally, they would face each other in the 2003 National League Championship Series between the Marlins and Cubs.

== Professional career ==
Gonzalez began his pro baseball career in the minor leagues in 1991 with the Gulf Coast Blue Jays. The following season, he moved up to Single-A, playing for the Myrtle Beach Hurricanes in the Carolina League. He was named the MVP of the Hurricanes as they won the South Atlantic League Championship. The Blue Jays named him the recipient of the Howard Webster award in 1992. In 1993, he moved up in the minors to Double-A, spending the season with the Southern League's Knoxville Smokies. Gonzalez made the AA and AAA all star teams. In 1994, Gonzalez played in the Venezuelan professional league during winter ball playing in Barquisimeto where he was named to the All Star team. After making the major league team to begin 1994, Gonzalez batted .151 in 15 games and was sent down to Triple-A Syracuse at the end of April because of a hamstring injury. With Syracuse, Gonzalez batted .284 as he spent the rest of the season in the minors due to the major league strike and made the all star team.

Gonzalez was the Blue Jays starting shortstop from 1995 to 2001. In 1999, his season was cut short after starting with a .290 batting average due to a torn labrum in his throwing arm. Dr. James Andrews performed surgery in August and, after a six-month rehab, he returned to the Blue Jays as their starting shortstop. Throughout his career, Gonzalez averaged around .250 with decent power for a middle infielder, but was unable to hit for high average. He made up for the lack of average with good RBI production and solid defense. He finished his career with 536 RBI and 137 home runs. He led the American league twice in fielding percentage for shortstops and he holds the American league record for assists in one game with 13, and was ranked first in 1997 with Total Zone Runs as a SS with 13. After spending eight years with the Toronto Blue Jays, he was traded to the Chicago Cubs on December 21, 2001, for Félix Heredia and minor leaguer James Deschaine. Gonzalez had two of his best seasons as the Cubs starting shortstop from 2002 to 2003. He hit five walk-off home runs during his two years with the Cubs. In 2003, he hit a career-high 20 home runs and advanced to the postseason with the Cubs. Gonzalez's strong point in the postseason was his offense; he batted .275 and hit 4 home runs in 12 postseason games. During the Cubs' eighth inning collapse in Game 6 of the 2003 NLCS versus the Florida Marlins, which became infamous due to the Steve Bartman incident, Gonzalez committed a fielding error on a ground ball in the hole hit by Miguel Cabrera, contributing to the Marlins scoring seven runs, five unearned, afterward in that inning.

On July 31, 2004, the day of the trading deadline, Gonzalez was dealt in a four-team trade to the Montreal Expos with the Cubs acquiring Boston's Nomar Garciaparra to play shortstop. After a brief stint with the Expos, he was sent as part of a conditional deal to the San Diego Padres on September 16. He became a free agent after the season and signed a one-year deal with the Tampa Bay Devil Rays for 2005 as a third baseman, making the switch from shortstop. Gonzalez had a productive year at 3B with the Devil Rays hitting .269 and playing good defensively. After a brief, 2006 run with the Philadelphia Phillies, Gonzalez retired from baseball. However, he came out of retirement on January 12, 2007, signing a minor league contract with the Kansas City Royals. But despite a strong showing in spring training during which he batted over .400, Gonzalez failed to make the Royals' 25-man roster prior to the 2007 season, and exercised his right to become a free agent. Shortly thereafter, he signed a minor league contract with the Washington Nationals and played 5 games for Triple-A Columbus before his release.

== Post-playing career ==
Gonzalez attended the University of Phoenix online and obtained a degree in business management. He is a principal at Miami Sports Management representing players in contract negotiations. He resides in Miami with his wife and children.

== Acting ==
Gonzalez appeared "as himself" in an episode of Ken Finkleman's satirical CBC comedy The Newsroom in 1997.

Gonzalez has worked as an analyst for NBC Sports and MLB Network covering season news and the World Baseball Classic.

== See also ==
- List of Cuban Americans
