= Luis Castillo (second baseman) =

Dominican baseball player (born 1975)

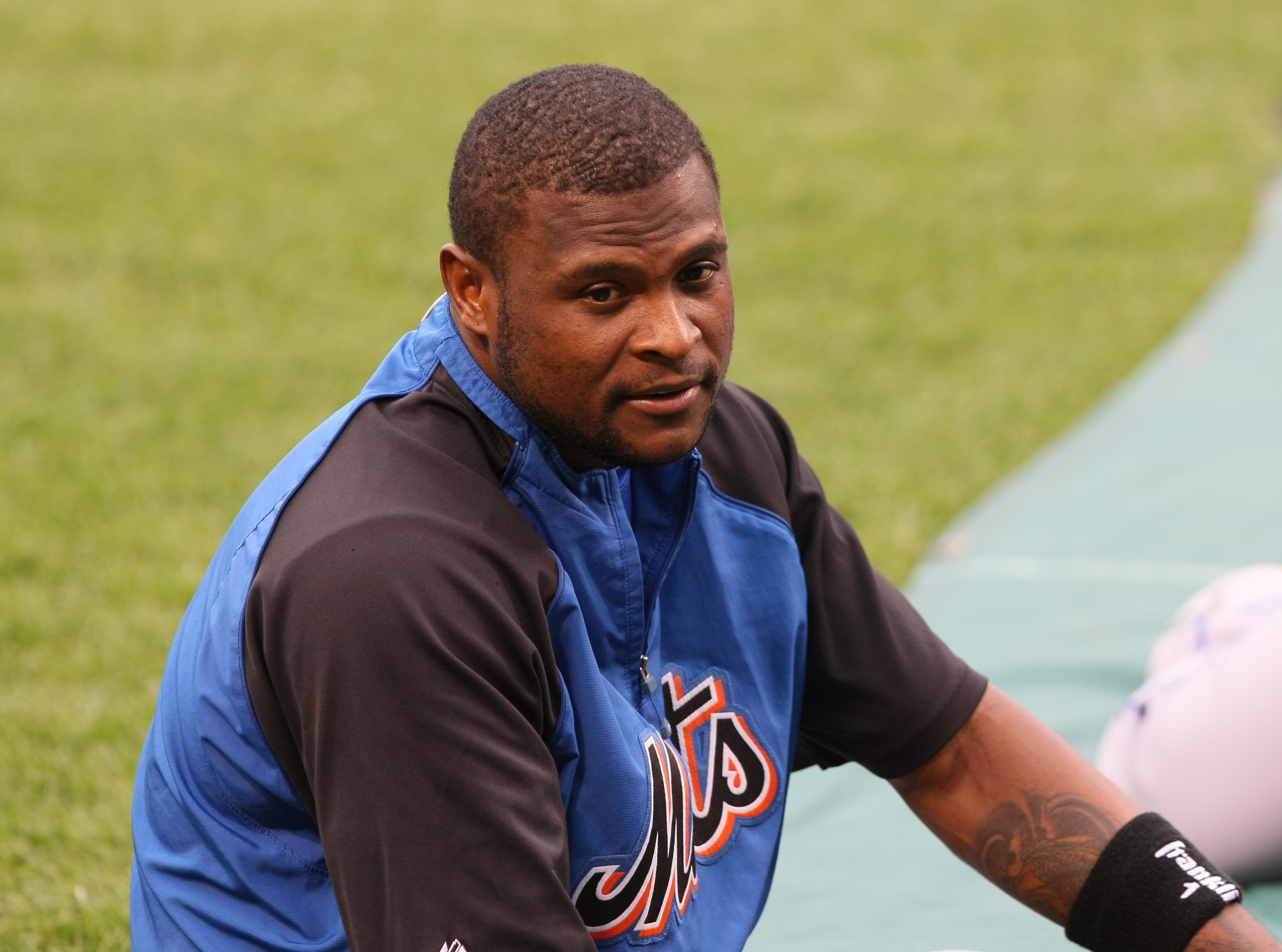
- Castillo with the New York Mets in 2009
- Second baseman
- Born: September 12, 1975 (age 51); San Pedro de Macorís, Dominican Republic
- Batted: Switch Threw: Right

MLB debut
- August 8, 1996, for the Florida Marlins

Last MLB appearance
- October 3, 2010, for the New York Mets

MLB statistics
- Batting average: .290
- Home runs: 28
- Runs batted in: 443
- Stolen bases: 370
- Stats at Baseball Reference

Teams
- Florida Marlins (1996–2005); Minnesota Twins (2006–2007); New York Mets (2007–2010)

Career highlights and awards
- 3× All-Star (2002, 2003, 2005); World Series champion (2003); 3× Gold Glove Award (2003–2005); 2× NL stolen base leader (2000, 2002); Marlins Legends Hall of Fame

Luis Antonio Castillo (born September 12, 1975) is a Dominican former professional baseball second baseman. He played in Major League Baseball for the Florida Marlins, New York Mets, and Minnesota Twins from 1996 through 2010.

Castillo is a three-time All-Star, three-time Gold Glove winner, and won the World Series with the Marlins in 1997 and 2003 (although he did not play in the 1997 series). He is also the only player who played for the Marlins in both of their World Series winning seasons who did not get traded in between the two seasons (Jeff Conine was on both teams but was traded after 1997 and returned during the 2003 season). The all-time leader in both games played (1,128) and base hits (1,273) for the Marlins, he is one of only two players to play 1,000 games for the franchise (the other also being Conine).

== Professional career ==
=== Early career ===
On August 19, 1992, Castillo was signed as a non-drafted free agent by the Florida Marlins. In 1994, he played his first year of baseball in the Gulf Coast League, playing for the Gulf Coast Marlins. He also set a Marlins short-season record in stolen bases, with 31.

In 1995, he was called up to the Kane County Cougars in the Class-A Midwest League, and was selected to the All-Star team. He injured his shoulder in July, causing him to miss the rest of the season. That year, he led the entire Marlins organization in batting average with .326, as well as being second in stolen bases.

Castillo spent most of the 1996 season in the Eastern League, but was called up to the Marlins mid-season and made his major league debut on August 8. His first major league hit came in a game against the New York Mets, where he knocked in the game-winning run in the 10th inning. He was named to the Eastern League All-Star team and post-season All-Star team.

=== Florida Marlins ===
==== 1997–99 ====
Castillo started playing full-time for the Marlins at second base during the 1997 season. Both at age 21, he and Édgar Rentería were the youngest middle infield combination in the history of the National League. He bruised his left heel mid-season and missed the entire month of May with the injury. He was optioned to the Triple-A Charlotte Knights on July 28 and did not come back to the major leagues until the next season. Due to this, he did not play for the Marlins during the 1997 World Series.

Castillo remained with the Charlotte Knights until being recalled to the Marlins on August 4, 1998. While in Charlotte, he had a streak of 32 consecutive games reaching base safely. With the Marlins, his highest hit streak was eight games, between August 14 and 19. By the end of the season, he was third among Marlins minor leaguers in stolen bases, with a .203 batting average, 3 stolen bases and 10 RBIs.

Castillo improved in 1999, with many short hitting streaks. These streaks included six games from May 10 to 17, and six games from August 1 to 7. He also had a 22-game hitting streak in a stretch between August 9 and September 3. He finished fourth in the league in stolen bases, and was fourth among leadoff hitters in on-base percentage at .385. He was named the Marlins Most Valuable Player by the South Florida Chapter of the Baseball Writers' Association of America.

==== 2000–02 ====
Castillo started the 2000 season with a seven-game hitting streak from April 5 to 12, though he was placed on the disabled list with a strained back shortly afterwards. A week after coming back, he set a single-game team record with four stolen bases on May 17. He had three in the next game, falling short of the National League record of 8 in two games, set by Walt Wilmot in 1894. In 2000, he also became the Marlins all-time stolen base leader by stealing his 116th career base on June 20 while playing the Milwaukee Brewers. He finished the season with 62 stolen bases, leading the entire major leagues.

In 2001, Castillo had two hitting streaks, eight games from May 6 to 13 and 14 games from June 29 to July 22. He finished fifth in the league in stolen bases with 33. He also had a .263 batting average, 45 RBIs, and 10 triples, a career high.

In 2002, Castillo had a 35-game hitting streak, which is the longest ever by a second baseman (since matched by fellow second baseman Chase Utley of the Philadelphia Phillies in 2006). This was the sixth-longest streak in the history of the National League, and also the 10th longest in the history of Major League Baseball. Castillo played second base in the 2002 All-Star Game, the first All-Star selection of his career. In 2002, he hit .305 with 39 RBIs and 48 stolen bases, leading the league in stolen bases for the second time in his career. He was again named the Marlins Most Valuable Player by the South Florida Chapter of the Baseball Writers' Association of America.

==== 2003–05 ====
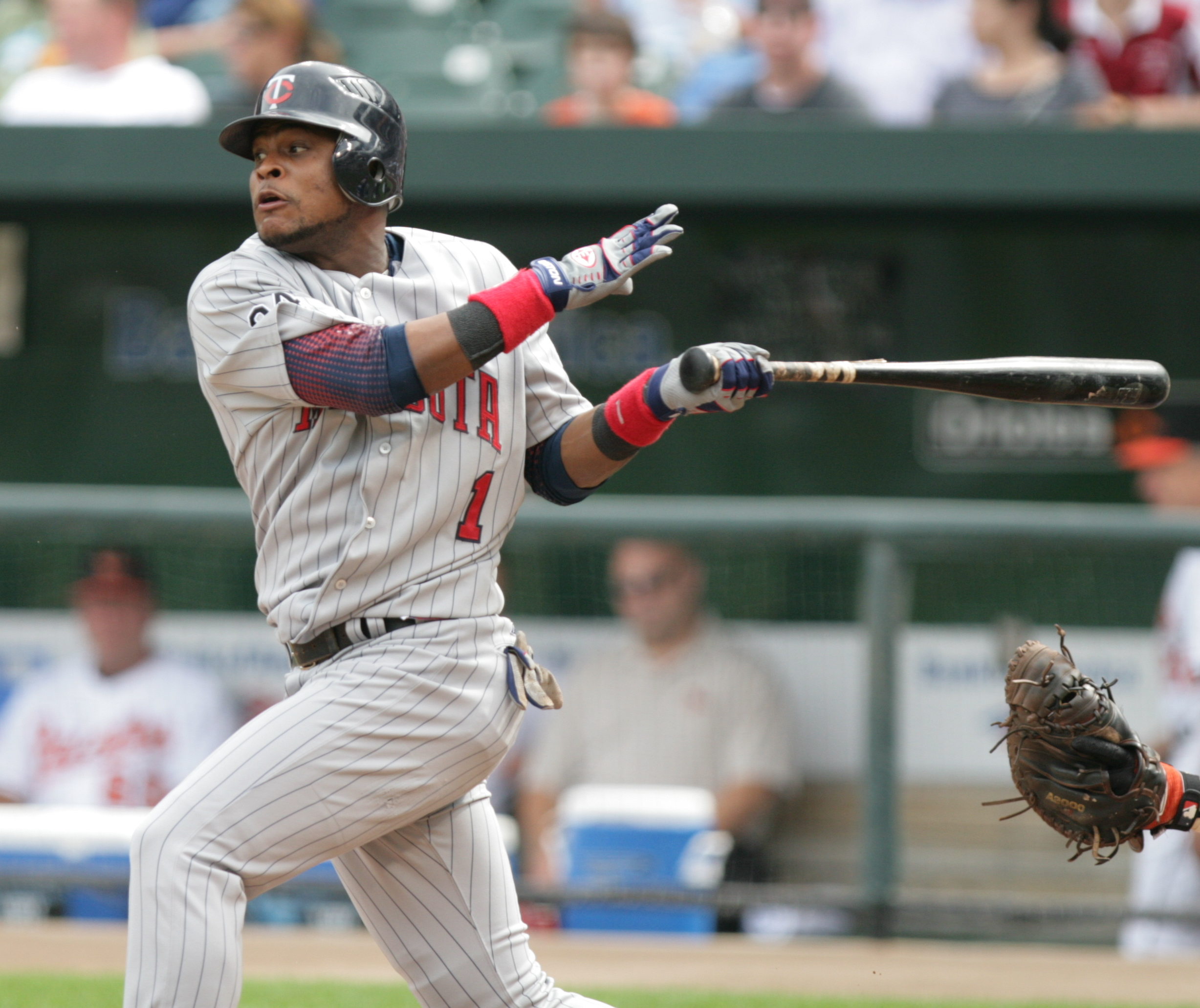
Batting for the Minnesota Twins in 2006

Castillo was a member of the National League All-Star team in 2003, his second career All-Star selection. He also led the Marlins in hitting and won his first career Gold Glove Award. Castillo was a central figure in the NLCS Game 6 comeback by the Marlins against the Chicago Cubs at Wrigley Field after a foul ball that he hit was knocked away from the Cubs' Moisés Alou by fan Steve Bartman. The Marlins went on to win that game, as well as Game 7, to get to the 2003 World Series, in which the Marlins defeated the heavily favored New York Yankees. This was the second World Series of Castillo's career, but the first in which he actually played.

In 2004, Castillo had a .291 batting average with 47 RBIs, a career best. He also had two home runs and seven triples. He was second only to Juan Pierre on the Marlins with a .373 on-base percentage and set a Marlins record with his 425th career walk, passing Gary Sheffield's previous mark of 424. Castillo won his second straight Gold Glove and posted the National League's second-best fielding percentage at second base (.991), behind Philadelphia's Plácido Polanco.

In his final season with the Marlins, Castillo won his third Gold Glove award in a row. He led the majors in batting versus left-handed pitchers with a .423 average. Castillo was also a member of the 2005 National League All-Star team, and replaced Jeff Kent of the Los Angeles Dodgers at second base in the second inning. He was traded to the Minnesota Twins on December 2, 2005, in exchange for two minor leaguers, Scott Tyler and Travis Bowyer. The Marlins replaced Castillo at second base with Dan Uggla, a Rule 5 selection from the Arizona Diamondbacks.

=== Minnesota Twins ===
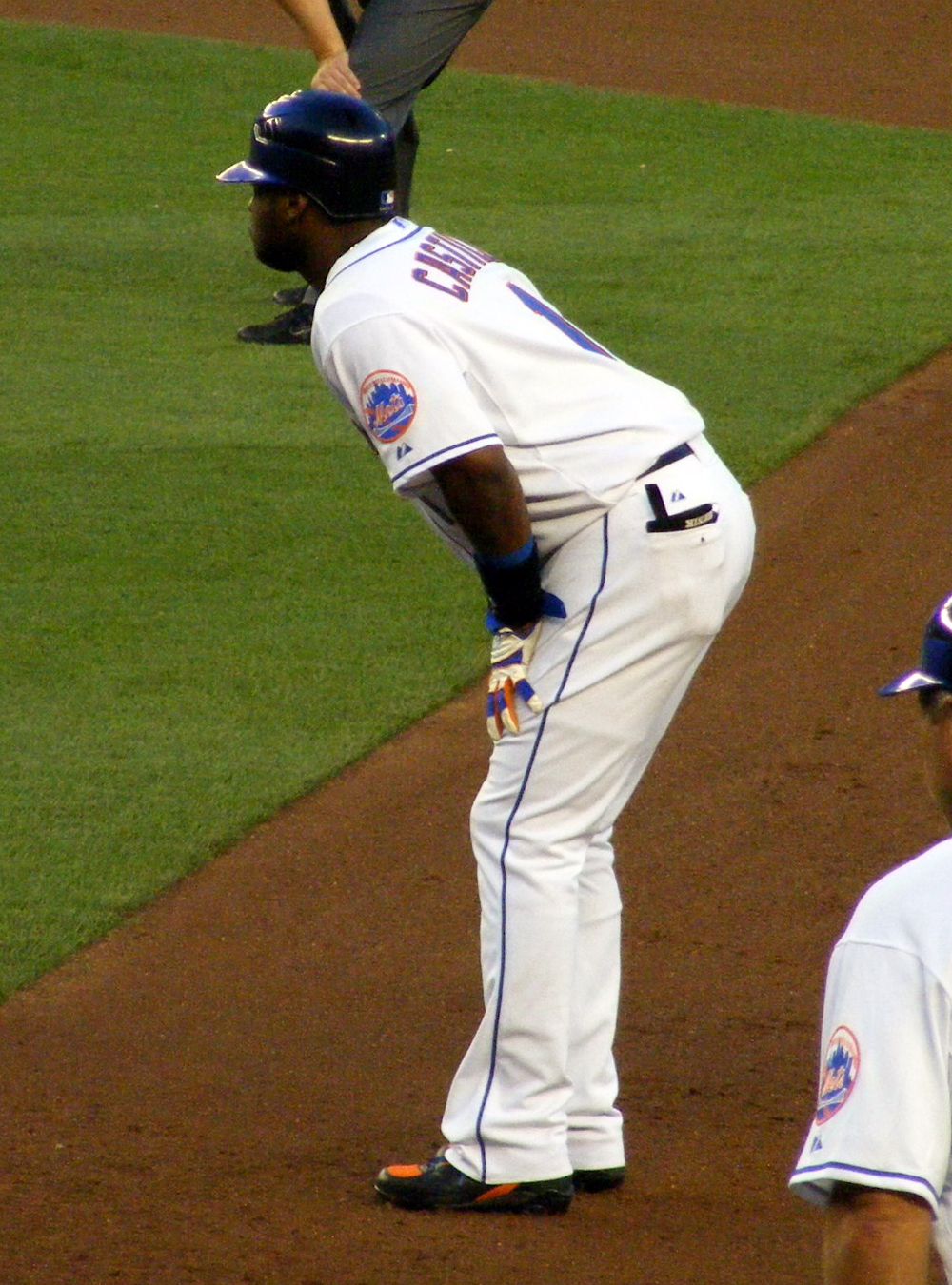
Castillo takes a lead on June 23, 2008

In 2006, Castillo began his only full season playing for the Minnesota Twins. He had an impressive first month of hitting, batting .432 with 19 hits. Over that stretch, Castillo drove in runs in five straight games from April 13 to 19. Castillo had three four-hit games for the Twins this season, on April 15, August 5, and August 9. He had a six-game hitting streak from May 6 to 13, and recorded his 300th career stolen base while facing the Chicago White Sox on August 26.

In the 2007 season, Castillo set a new Major League Baseball record, going 143 games at second base without an error. He also recorded his 1,500th career hit on May 29 while facing the Chicago White Sox.

=== New York Mets ===
Castillo was traded by the Twins to the New York Mets on July 30, 2007, for two minor league players, catcherDrew Butera and outfielder Dustin Martin. He finished the season with a .301 batting average with one home run, 38 RBIs and 19 stolen bases. On November 18, the Mets re-signed him to a four-year contract worth a reported $25 million. Castillo had a strong finish to the 2007 season after being traded. He reached base safely in 40 of his last 46 games, and scored 34 runs in his last 42 games. In 50 games as a Met, Castillo batted .296 with 20 RBIs and 10 stolen bases.

In 2008, a year plagued with injuries and several bench stints, Castillo hit .245 in 87 games, but still managed to steal 17 bases in 19 attempts.

In 2009 spring training, Castillo led all major league players in walks, with 17 from 56 official at-bats. On March 16, 2009, Castillo was presented the opportunity to bat right-handed instead of being a switch hitter. He declined, and continued to be a switch hitter throughout the rest of his career. Although the Mets struggled as a team, Castillo enjoyed a bounce-back year in '09, hitting .302 with 77 runs scored and a .387 on-base percentage. However, on June 12, with two outs in the bottom of the ninth inning and runners on first and second base, Castillo dropped an easy pop fly hit by Alex Rodriguez for a two-run game-ending error at Yankee Stadium, earning him a measure of infamy in the Mets–Yankees rivalry and a place in Mets' history.

On June 4, 2010, the Mets put Castillo on the disabled list because of problems in both his feet. He was replaced by Rubén Tejada who played at second base in the Mets' 5–4 win against the Florida Marlins at Citi Field. He was criticized, along with Carlos Beltrán and Óliver Pérez, for not visiting injured soldiers at Walter Reed Army Medical Center with his teammates. Castillo commented on not being happy with his playing time and "has to work something out this offseason". During spring training of 2010, he was booed by the home fans at Digital Domain Park where the Mets play their spring training games. He was released from the Mets spring training roster on March 18, 2011.

On March 21, 2011, Castillo signed a minor league deal with the Philadelphia Phillies. On March 22, he reported to Phillies training camp. Castillo was released shortly thereafter on March 30, 2011.

He appeared on the ballot for the National Baseball Hall of Fame and Museum 2016 election and earned zero votes.

=== Career statistics ===
In 1,720 games over 15 seasons, Castillo posted a .290 batting average (1,889-for-6,510) with 1,001 runs, 194 doubles, 59 triples, 28 home runs, 443 RBI, 370 stolen bases, 800 bases on balls, .368 on-base percentage and .351 slugging percentage. He finished his career with a .984 fielding percentage playing every inning of his major league career at second base. In 20 postseason games, he hit .220 (18-for-82) with 6 runs, 4 doubles, 4 RBI, 3 stolen bases and 11 walks.

== Personal life ==
Castillo graduated from the class of 1991 at Colegio San Benito Abad in the Dominican Republic. He is married and has two children—Luis Jr., born on October 12, 2001, and Adonai, born on July 30, 2009.

In August 2019, Castillo was cited on charges related to a drug trafficking and money laundering operation, while Octavio Dotel was arrested on related charges. In late August 2019, Castillo was cleared of money laundering charges, and it was determined that there was no evidence to link Castillo to any money laundering activity.

== See also ==
- List of Major League Baseball annual stolen base leaders
- List of Major League Baseball career stolen bases leaders
- List of Major League Baseball career runs scored leaders
- List of Miami Marlins team records
