= List of Miami Marlins Opening Day starting pitchers =

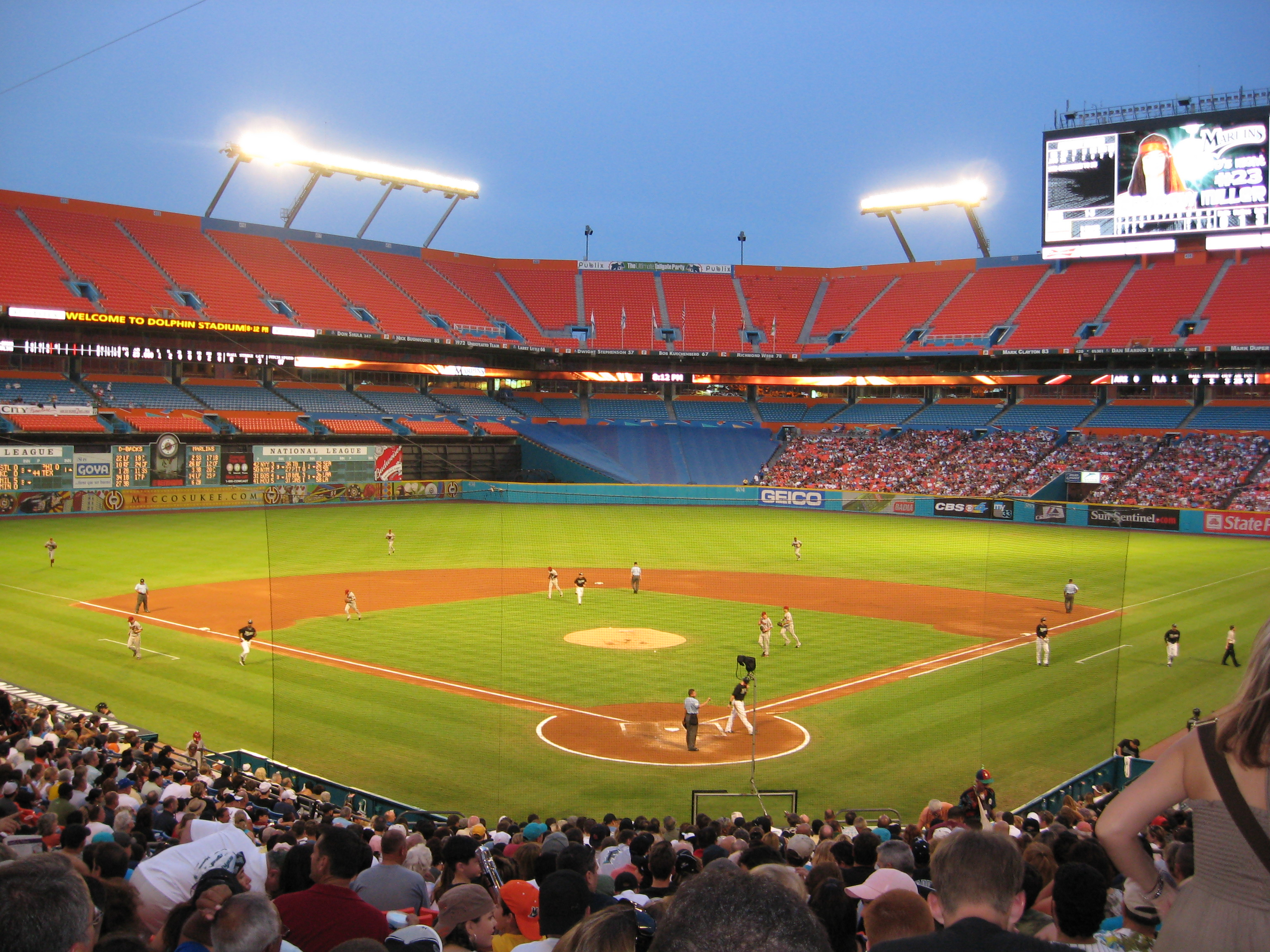
Hard Rock Stadium, the Marlins former home ballpark from 1993-2011

The Miami Marlins are a Major League Baseball (MLB) franchise based in Miami, Florida. They play in the National League East division. The first game of the new baseball season for a team is played on Opening Day, and being named the Opening Day starter is an honor, which is often given to the player who is expected to lead the pitching staff that season, though there are various strategic reasons why a team's best pitcher might not start on Opening Day. The Marlins have used 17 different Opening Day starting pitchers in their 27 seasons. Since the Marlins' first season in 1993, the 17 starters have a combined Opening Day record of 12 wins and 14 losses with two no-decisions. Notably, no Marlins Opening Day starter received a no-decision until the team's 24th season in 2016. No-decisions are only awarded to the starting pitcher if the game is won or lost after the starting pitcher has left the game.

Nine Marlins pitchers have started on two or more Opening Days. Those nine are Charlie Hough, Kevin Brown, Alex Fernandez, Ryan Dempster, Josh Beckett, Dontrelle Willis, Josh Johnson, Ricky Nolasco, and José Ureña. Beckett and Johnson hold the record for most Opening Day starts as a Marlin, with three appearances each, from 2003 to 2005 for Beckett and 2010 to 2012 for Johnson. When playing at their original home field, the venue now known as Hard Rock Stadium, the Marlins had a record of nine wins and five losses (9–5). At their current home of Marlins Park, Opening Day pitchers have a record of 1–5 with one no-decision. In the franchise's history, the Marlins have only played Opening Day games at another team's home stadium eight times. As the away team, Marlins' starting pitchers have an Opening Day record of 1–6 with one no-decision.

The longest ever Opening Day winning streak for Marlins starting pitchers is four years, when Florida won from 1997 to 2000 under starting pitchers Kevin Brown (1997), Liván Hernández (1998), and Alex Fernandez (1999 and 2000). This streak was sandwiched by the Marlins' two longest Opening Day losing streaks for starting pitchers, each at three losses. The first was in 1994, 1995, and 1996 under starting pitchers Charlie Hough (1994), John Burkett (1995), and Kevin Brown (1996); the second was in 2001, 2002, and 2003 under Ryan Dempster (2001 and 2002) and Josh Beckett (2003) The Marlins have won the World Series twice, in 1997 and 2003, and in those seasons, their starting pitchers had one win and one loss on Opening Day.

== Key ==
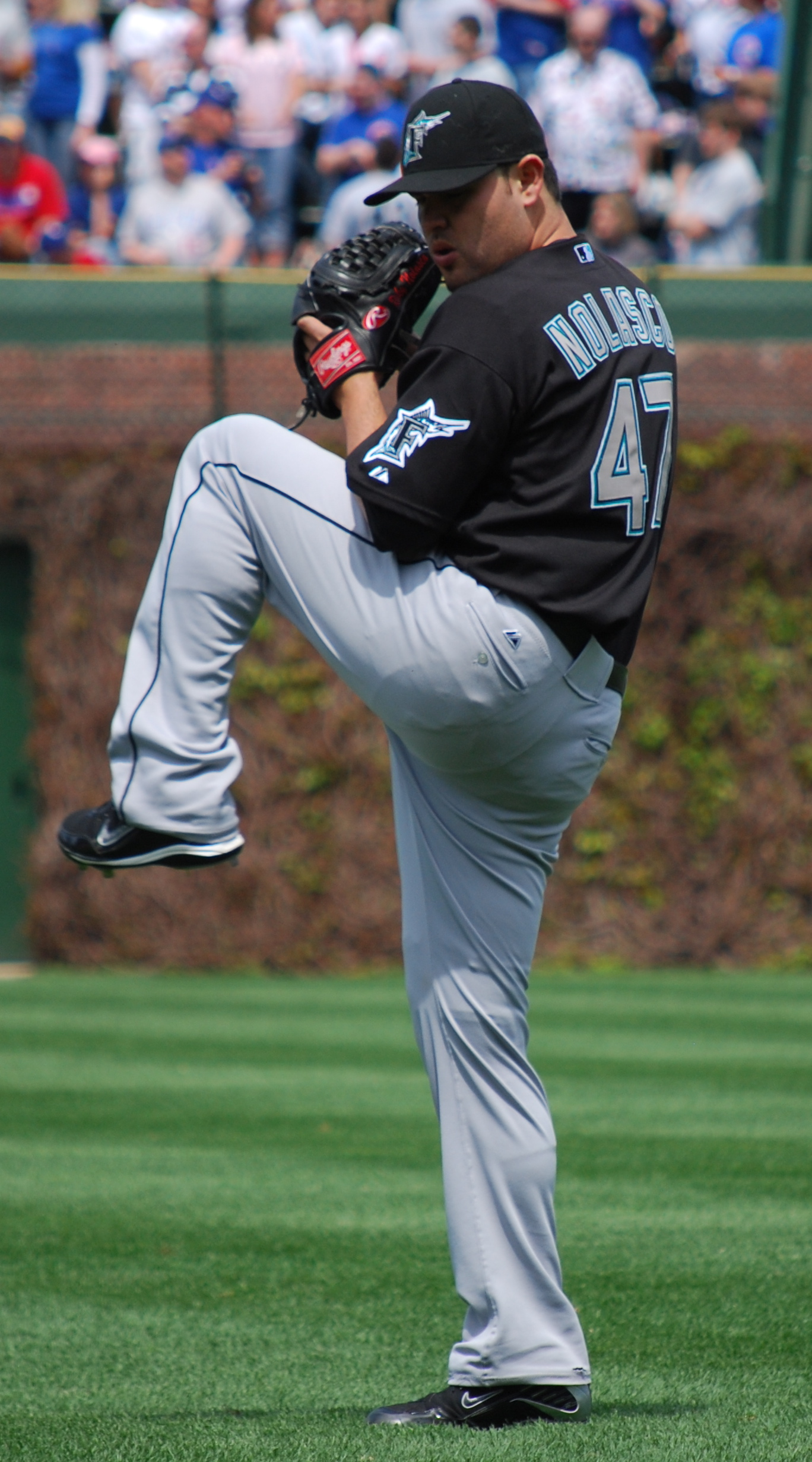
Ricky Nolasco, the 2009 opening day starter

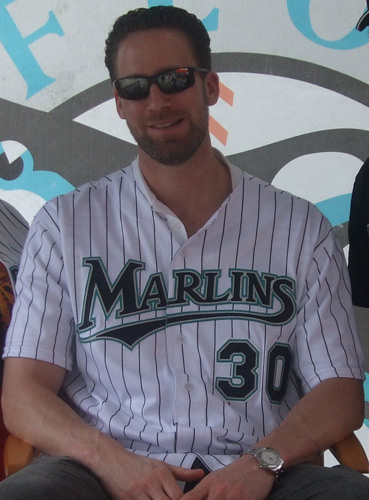
Mark Hendrickson, the 2008 Opening Day starter

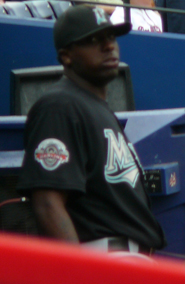
Dontrelle Willis, the 2006 and 2007 Opening Day starter

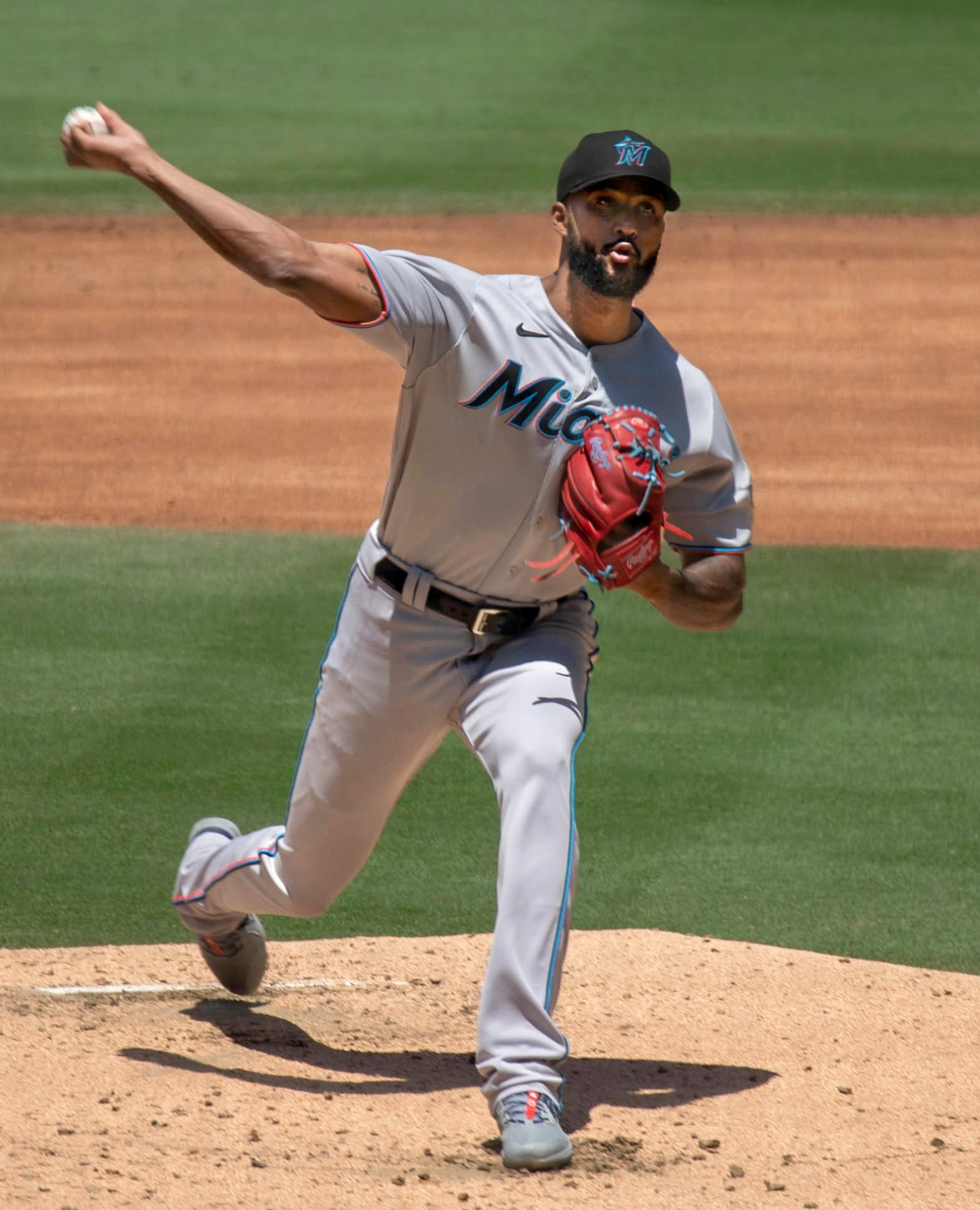
Sandy Alcántara, the 2020–23 Opening Day starter

Season	Each year is linked to an article about that particular Marlins season.
W	Win
L	Loss
ND (W)	No decision by starting pitcher; Marlins won game
ND (L)	No decision by starting pitcher; Marlins lost game
Pitcher (#)	Number of appearances as Opening Day starter with the Marlins
*	Advanced to the post-season
†	World Series Champions

== Pitchers ==
Season	Pitcher	Decision	Opponent	Location	Ref(s)
1993	Charlie Hough	W	Los Angeles Dodgers	Joe Robbie Stadium	
1994	Charlie Hough (2)	L	Los Angeles Dodgers	Dodger Stadium	
1995	John Burkett	L	Los Angeles Dodgers	Joe Robbie Stadium	
1996	Kevin Brown	L	Pittsburgh Pirates	Joe Robbie Stadium	
1997†	Kevin Brown (2)	W	Chicago Cubs	Pro Player Stadium	
1998	Liván Hernández	W	Chicago Cubs	Pro Player Stadium	
1999	Alex Fernandez	W	New York Mets	Pro Player Stadium	
2000	Alex Fernandez (2)	W	San Francisco Giants	Pro Player Stadium	
2001	Ryan Dempster	L	Philadelphia Phillies	Pro Player Stadium	
2002	Ryan Dempster (2)	L	Montreal Expos	Olympic Stadium	
2003†	Josh Beckett	L	Philadelphia Phillies	Pro Player Stadium	
2004	Josh Beckett (2)	W	Montreal Expos	Pro Player Stadium	
2005	Josh Beckett (3)	W	Atlanta Braves	Dolphins Stadium	
2006	Dontrelle Willis	L	Houston Astros	Minute Maid Park	
2007	Dontrelle Willis (2)	W	Washington Nationals	Robert F. Kennedy Stadium	
2008	Mark Hendrickson	L	New York Mets	Dolphin Stadium	
2009	Ricky Nolasco	W	Washington Nationals	Dolphin Stadium	
2010	Josh Johnson	L	New York Mets	Citi Field	
2011	Josh Johnson (2)	W	New York Mets	Sun Life Stadium	
2012	Josh Johnson (3)	L	St. Louis Cardinals	Marlins Park	
2013	Ricky Nolasco (2)	L	Washington Nationals	Nationals Park	
2014	José Fernández	W	Colorado Rockies	Marlins Park	
2015	Henderson Álvarez	L	Atlanta Braves	Marlins Park	
2016	Wei-Yin Chen	ND (L)	Detroit Tigers	Marlins Park	
2017	Edinson Vólquez	ND (L)	Washington Nationals	Nationals Park	
2018	José Ureña	L	Chicago Cubs	Marlins Park	
2019	José Ureña (2)	L	Colorado Rockies	Marlins Park	
2020*	Sandy Alcántara	W	Philadelphia Phillies	Citizens Bank Park	
2021	Sandy Alcántara (2)	ND (L)	Tampa Bay Rays	LoanDepot Park	
2022	Sandy Alcántara (3)	ND (L)	San Francisco Giants	Oracle Park	
2023*	Sandy Alcántara (4)	ND (L)	New York Mets	LoanDepot Park	
2024	Jesús Luzardo	ND (L)	Pittsburgh Pirates	LoanDepot Park	
2025	Sandy Alcántara (5)	ND (W)	Pittsburgh Pirates	LoanDepot Park	
2026	Sandy Alcántara (6)	W	Colorado Rockies	LoanDepot Park	
