= José Ureña =

Dominican baseball player (born 1991)

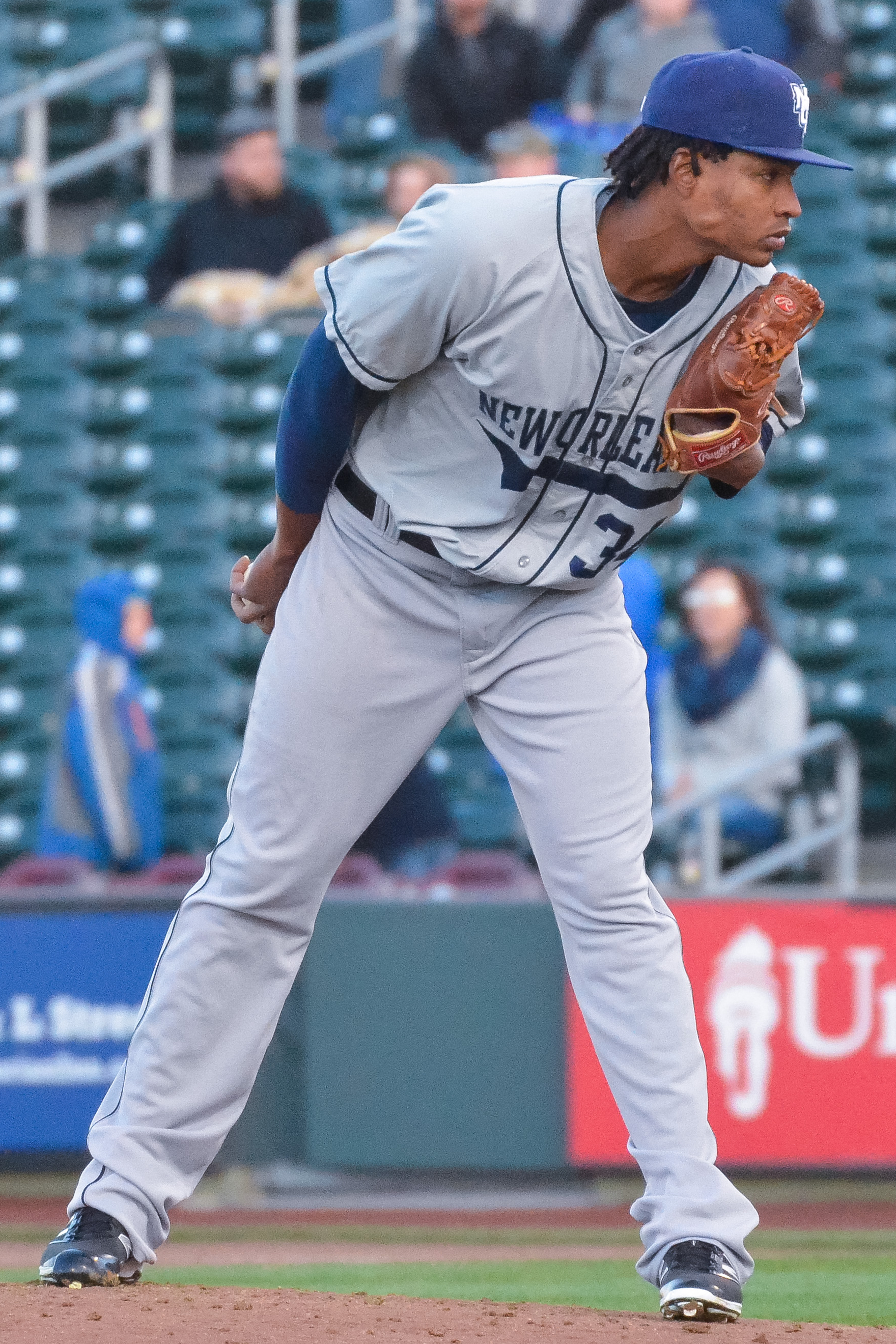
- Ureña pitching for the New Orleans Zephyrs in 2016

Tohoku Rakuten Golden Eagles – No. 22
- Pitcher
- Born: September 12, 1991 (age 35); Santo Domingo, Dominican Republic
- Bats: Right Throws: Right

Professional debut
- MLB: April 14, 2015, for the Miami Marlins
- NPB: April 2, 2026, for the Tohoku Rakuten Golden Eagles

MLB statistics (through 2025 season)
- Win–loss record: 44–78
- Earned run average: 4.75
- Strikeouts: 669

NPB statistics (through August 21, 2026)
- Win–loss record: 2–4
- Earned run average: 4.36
- Strikeouts: 37
- Stats at Baseball Reference

Teams
- Miami Marlins (2015–2020); Detroit Tigers (2021); Milwaukee Brewers (2022); Colorado Rockies (2022–2023); Chicago White Sox (2023); Texas Rangers (2024); New York Mets (2025); Toronto Blue Jays (2025); Los Angeles Dodgers (2025); Minnesota Twins (2025); Los Angeles Angels (2025); Tohoku Rakuten Golden Eagles (2026–present)

José Miguel Ureña Rodríguez (born September 12, 1991) is a Dominican professional baseball pitcher for the Tohoku Rakuten Golden Eagles of Nippon Professional Baseball (NPB). He has previously played in Major League Baseball (MLB) for the Miami Marlins, Detroit Tigers, Milwaukee Brewers, Colorado Rockies, Chicago White Sox, Texas Rangers, New York Mets, Toronto Blue Jays, Los Angeles Dodgers, Minnesota Twins, and Los Angeles Angels.

In 2025, Ureña tied the major league record for most franchises played for in a single season, appearing with five. This tied Mike Baumann (2024), Oliver Drake (2018), and Bobo Leonard (1924).

== Career ==
=== Florida / Miami Marlins ===
==== Minor leagues ====
Ureña grew up in the Dominican Republic and was signed by the Florida Marlins as an international free agent on August 28, 2009. He spent his first two professional seasons in the Dominican Summer League Marlins.

In 2011, Ureña pitched in Low‑A ball with the Jamestown Jammers, where he posted a 4.33 earned run average (ERA) in 15 starts. The following year, he advanced to full‑season Single‑A with the Greensboro Grasshoppers, recording a 3.38 ERA in 138 1/3 innings. In 2013, he played for the High‑A Jupiter Hammerheads, pitching 149 2/3 innings with a 3.73 ERA.

The 2014 season marked a breakout year in the minors, as Ureña finished with a 13–8 record, 121 strikeouts, and a 3.33 ERA across 162 innings pitched.

Ureña began the 2015 season with the New Orleans Zephyrs of the Triple–A Pacific Coast League.

==== Major leagues ====
Ureña was called up to the major leagues for the first time on April 13, 2015, replacing David Phelps on the roster. In his first major league start on May 26, 2015, against the Pittsburgh Pirates, he allowed five runs in 4 2/3 innings and took the 5–1 loss. He finished the 2015 season with a 1–5 record and a 5.25 ERA in 20 games (9 starts).

In 2016, Ureña split time between starting and relief roles, ending the season with a 4–9 record and a 6.13 ERA in 28 games (12 starts).

Ureña improved in 2017, appearing in 34 games (28 starts) with a 14–7 record and a 3.82 ERA. That year, he also led the major leagues by hitting 14 batters with pitches.

Ureña was named the Marlins’ Opening Day starter for 2018. On Opening Day, March 29, against the Chicago Cubs, he allowed a first‑pitch home run to Ian Happ and surrendered five runs over 4+ innings in an 8–4 loss.

Ureña made 16 starts in 2018 before being placed on the disabled list with a shoulder injury. On August 15, he was ejected in a game against the Atlanta Braves after hitting Ronald Acuña Jr. with the first pitch, leading both teams’ benches to clear; he received a six‑game suspension for the incident.

In his next start, Ureña threw a complete game against the Washington Nationals, allowing one run on two hits and striking out four batters. He finished the 2018 season by winning six of his final seven starts with a 1.80 ERA over that span.

By posting a 3.82 ERA in 2017 and a 3.98 ERA in 2018, Ureña became only the sixth pitcher in Marlins history to record consecutive sub‑4.00 ERA seasons, joining Pat Rapp, Kevin Brown, Dontrelle Willis, Josh Johnson, and Aníbal Sánchez.

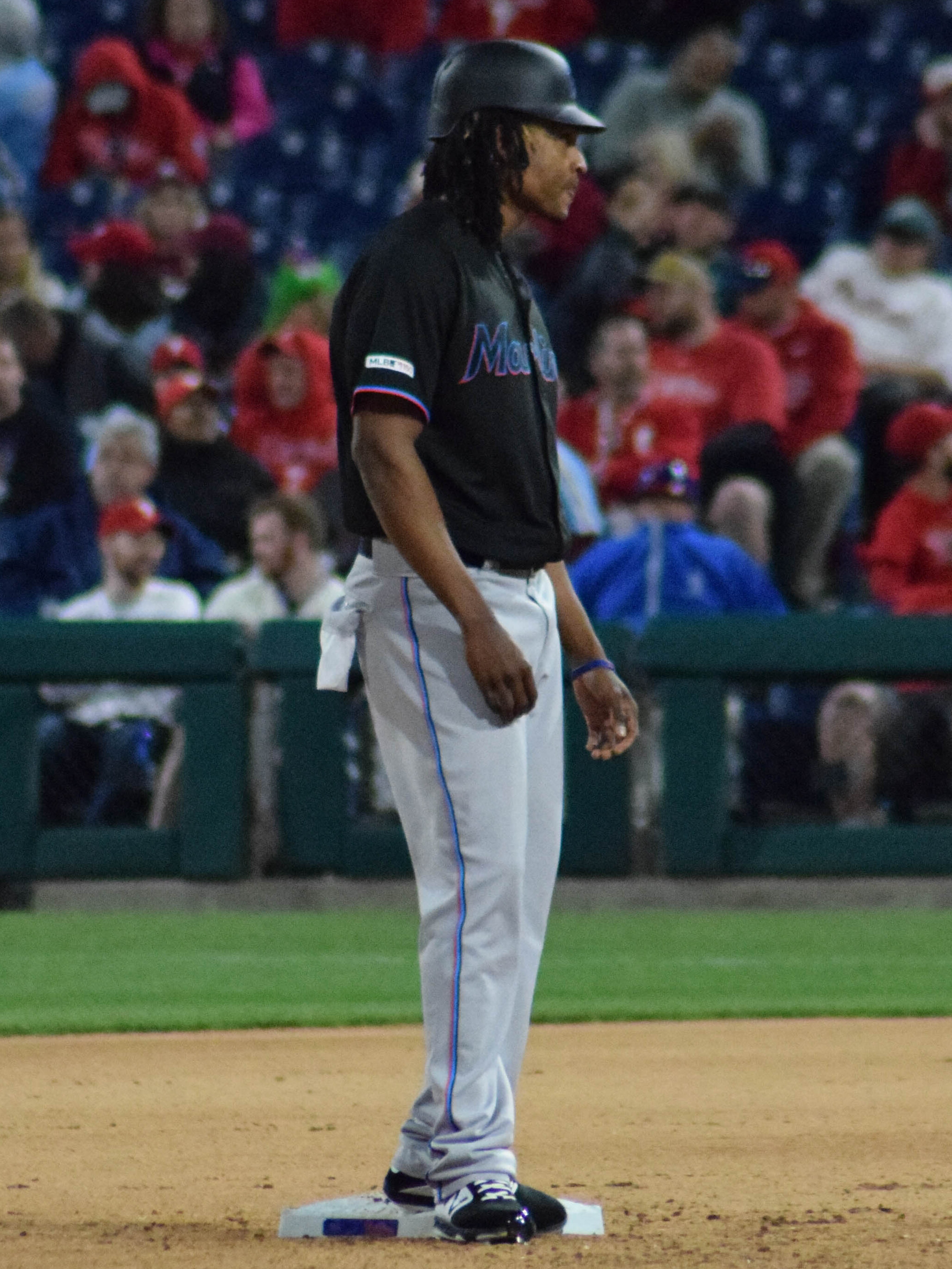
Ureña with the Marlins in 2019

In 2019, Ureña became the eighth pitcher in Marlins history to make consecutive Opening Day starts. After an 0–3 start, he posted eight quality starts over the next nine outings, going 4–3 with a 2.95 ERA in that span. On June 7, 2019, he was placed on the injured list with a herniated disc in his lower back; at the time, he was tied for 12th in MLB with eight quality starts.

On November 30, 2020, Ureña was designated for assignment by the Marlins following the acquisition of Adam Cimber. He was non‑tendered by the Marlins on December 2, 2020, making him a free agent.

=== Detroit Tigers ===
On December 23, 2020, Ureña signed a one-year, $3.25 million contract with the Detroit Tigers. Ureña earned a spot in the Tigers starting rotation to begin the 2021 season. After three losses to start the season, Ureña earned his first victory as a Tiger on April 27, allowing one earned run in seven innings as the Tigers beat the Chicago White Sox, 5–2. On May 2, 2021, Ureña became the first Tiger pitcher since David Price in 2015 to have four consecutive starts of at least seven innings while allowing two runs or fewer in every start. However, due to poor run support, Ureña only won one of these games. Ureña was placed on the 10-day injured list with a groin strain on June 17. He returned to make a start on August 28. He pitched in 26 games (18 starts) for the 2021 Tigers, compiling a 4–8 record with a 5.81 ERA.

=== Milwaukee Brewers ===
On March 29, 2022, Ureña signed a minor league contract with the Milwaukee Brewers. The following day, Ureña had his contract selected to the 40-man and active rosters. He pitched to a 3.52 ERA with 3 strikeouts in 4 relief appearances for Milwaukee before he was designated for assignment on May 2. He elected free agency on May 10, 2022.

=== Colorado Rockies ===
On May 13, 2022, Ureña signed a minor league deal with the Colorado Rockies organization. On July 6, 2022, he was called up to the majors. In 17 starts for Colorado, Ureña worked to a 3–8 record and 5.14 ERA with 60 strikeouts in 89.1 innings pitched.

On November 11, 2022, Ureña re–signed with Colorado on a one-year, $3 million contract with a 2024 club option. In 5 starts for the Rockies in 2023, he struggled to a 0–4 record and 9.82 ERA with 9 strikeouts in 18 1/3 innings of work. He was designated for assignment on April 25, 2023. Ureña was released by Colorado on April 27.

=== Washington Nationals ===
On May 3, 2023, Ureña signed a minor league contract with the Washington Nationals organization. In 15 starts for the Triple–A Rochester Red Wings, he recorded a 6.31 ERA with 56 strikeouts in 67.0 innings of work. On August 3, Ureña was released by Washington.

=== Chicago White Sox ===
On August 8, 2023, Ureña signed a minor league contract with the Chicago White Sox organization. In 4 starts for the Triple–A Charlotte Knights, he logged a 3.38 ERA with 20 strikeouts in 21 1/3 innings pitched. The White Sox purchased Ureña's contract to the major league roster on September 9, and he started that day against the Detroit Tigers. He took the loss after allowing one run on four hits and two walks with three strikeouts in four innings of work. In five starts with the White Sox, Ureña went 0–3 with a 4.10 ERA with 20 strikeouts in 26.1 innings pitched, also logging 2 quality starts. Consistent with his time as a Marlin, Ureña received little run support as a member of the White Sox with the team only scoring 11 total runs in his five starts. He became a free agent on November 2, 2023.

=== Texas Rangers ===
On January 16, 2024, Ureña signed a minor league contract with the Texas Rangers. On March 26, it was announced that Ureña had made Texas' Opening Day roster. Beginning the year in the bullpen, his first five appearances spanned 9.1 scoreless innings mostly working in middle relief. After making 10 appearances as a reliever, Ureña was given the starting nod against the Oakland Athletics on May 7, a game in which he got the win after giving up one earned run and striking out two in five innings of work. He remained a member of the starting rotation for an additional five starts, going 2–3 with a 2.84 ERA over that span. On June 5, he took a perfect game into the 6th inning against the Detroit Tigers, before giving up a home run to Justyn-Henry Malloy. He finished the game with the win after striking out six in 6.2 innings pitched. Moving back to the bullpen for the remainder of June, Ureña finished the month with a 0.50 ERA in 18 innings pitched, striking out 13 and walking just three. On June 23, Ureña earned his first save of the season after tossing four scoreless innings against the Kansas City Royals. On August 19, he became the first Rangers pitcher since Pat Mahomes Sr. to have three relief appearances of four or more scoreless innings in the same season. Ureña finished the season as one of only 12 players in the league to have both a quality start (three) and a save (one), totaling out at 5–8 with a 3.80 ERA in 109 innings of work. He became a free agent on October 31.

=== New York Mets ===
On February 27, 2025, Ureña signed a minor league contract with the New York Mets. He was assigned to the Triple-A Syracuse Mets to begin the year, where he posted a 2.89 ERA with eight strikeouts over three starts. On April 27, the Mets selected Ureña's contract, adding him to their active roster. Ureña made his season debut on April 28 and earned a save despite allowing five earned runs in three innings. He was designated for assignment by the Mets the following day. Ureña elected free agency after clearing waivers on May 1.

=== Toronto Blue Jays ===
On May 5, 2025, Ureña signed a one-year, major league contract with the Toronto Blue Jays. In six appearances for Toronto, he recorded a 3.65 ERA with five strikeouts across 12 1/3 innings pitched. On May 31, Ureña was designated for assignment by the Blue Jays. He cleared waivers and elected free agency on June 2.

=== Los Angeles Dodgers ===
On June 3, 2025, Ureña signed a major league contract with the Los Angeles Dodgers. He allowed one earned run on four hits and one walk, and recorded two strikeouts in three innings pitched over two appearances for the Dodgers. Ureña was designated for assignment by Los Angeles on June 10, and elected free agency after clearing waivers on June 13.

=== Minnesota Twins ===
On June 24, 2025, Ureña signed a minor league contract with the Minnesota Twins. In six appearances (four starts) for the Triple-A St. Paul Saints, he logged an 0–1 record and 4.05 ERA with 13 strikeouts across 13 1/3 innings pitched. On August 1, the Twins selected Ureña's contract, adding him to their active roster. In his first game for the Twins, Ureña pitched 4 innings with two earned runs in an eventual win against the Cleveland Guardians. In four appearances (three starts) for Minnesota, he logged an 0–1 record and 4.58 ERA with 10 strikeouts across 17 2/3 innings pitched. Ureña was designated for assignment by the Twins on August 23. He elected free agency after clearing waivers on August 25.

=== Los Angeles Angels ===
On August 31, 2025, Ureña signed a major league contract with the Los Angeles Angels. On September 5, Ureña made his debut for the Angels in a 10–4 loss to the Athletics, tying the major league record for the most franchises played for in a single season with five. He shares the record with Mike Baumann (2024), Oliver Drake (2018), and Bobo Leonard (1924). In six appearances for Los Angeles, Ureña recorded a 3.79 ERA with 14 strikeouts over 19 innings of work.

=== Tohoku Rakuten Golden Eagles ===
On January 14, 2026, Ureña signed with the Tohoku Rakuten Golden Eagles of Nippon Professional Baseball.

== Pitching style ==
According to a scouting report prepared for MLB's 2014 midseason prospect rankings, the eighth-ranked Ureña had "an above-average fastball that can touch the mid 90s", a change-up, and a breaking ball that is "a combination of a slider and a curve". He was said to have "above-average command". However, Ureña's command of the ball has dipped significantly since the start of the 2017 season with ESPN writers recognizing "a history of control problems," noting that he hit 14 batters in 2017, tying in MLB for hit batters, and as of hitting Ronald Acuña Jr. in 2018, had tied for second in the National League, hitting 10 batters.

According to Fangraphs, Ureña throws four-seam and sinking two-seam fastballs that each average 95 MPH (topping out at 99 MPH). His "slurve" is thrown at 84 to 88 MPH, and he mixes in a changeup at about 89 MPH.
