= Hanley Ramírez =

Dominican baseball player (born 1983)

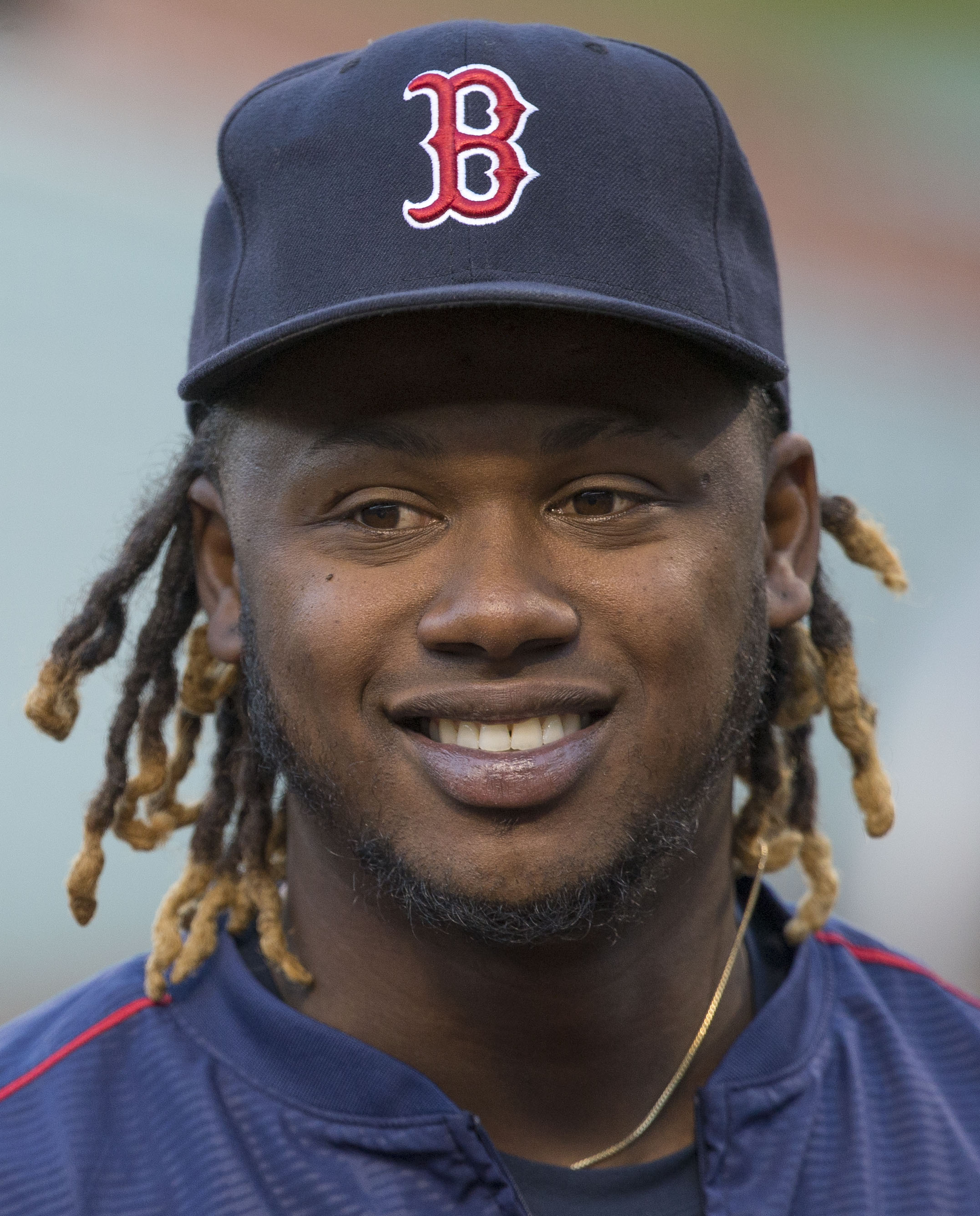
- Ramírez with the Boston Red Sox in 2015
- Shortstop
- Born: December 23, 1983 (age 42); Samaná, Dominican Republic
- Batted: Right Threw: Right

MLB debut
- September 20, 2005, for the Boston Red Sox

Last MLB appearance
- April 17, 2019, for the Cleveland Indians

MLB statistics
- Batting average: .289
- Home runs: 271
- Runs batted in: 917
- Stats at Baseball Reference

Teams
- Boston Red Sox (2005); Florida / Miami Marlins (2006–2012); Los Angeles Dodgers (2012–2014); Boston Red Sox (2015–2018); Cleveland Indians (2019)

Career highlights and awards
- 3× All-Star (2008–2010); NL Rookie of the Year (2006); 2× Silver Slugger Award (2008, 2009); NL batting champion (2009)
Medals
Men's baseball
Representing Dominican Republic
World Baseball Classic
Gold medal – first place	2013 San Francisco	Team

Hanley Ramírez (born December 23, 1983) is a Dominican-American former professional baseball shortstop. He played in Major League Baseball (MLB) for the Boston Red Sox, Florida / Miami Marlins, Los Angeles Dodgers, and Cleveland Indians. Ramírez is a three-time MLB All-Star and received the 2006 National League Rookie of the Year Award. While he played the majority of his career at shortstop, he also played first base, third base and left field.

Ramírez established himself as an elite hitter during his prime years, with a high career batting average (.289) and a high isolated power (.197). However, he was rated as a poor defensive shortstop, resulting in a move to left field with the Red Sox, where he fared even worse defensively. For the 2016 season, he was transitioned to first base, a move that yielded good results both offensively and defensively. Ramirez's hitting declined from 2017 on, however, as he posted the lowest batting averages and the lowest OPS of his MLB career.

== Early life ==
Hanley Ramírez was born on December 23, 1983, in Samaná, Dominican Republic, to Toribio and Isabela Ramírez. His father was an auto mechanic. His first name is a misspelling of Hamlet, which had been proposed by Ramírez's grandmother, a devoted reader of Shakespeare. A clerk was responsible for the erroneous spelling, but Ramírez himself has expressed no misgivings, later saying, "I love my name."

At an early age, Ramírez was an avid baseball fan. He was also known as a basketball player. He attended Adventista High School in Samaná, and attracted the attention of MLB scouts. Boston Red Sox scout Levy Ochoa signed him to the Red Sox in 2000.

== Professional career ==
=== Minor leagues ===
Ramírez signed with the Boston Red Sox as an international free agent in July 2000, at age 16. He played in the Dominican Summer League for the DSL Red Sox in 2001. In 2002, with the GCL Red Sox he hit .340 and was selected as a Gulf Coast League and Rookie League All-Star. He also batted .371 in 22 games with the Class A Short Season Lowell Spinners that year.

Ramírez spent 2003 with the Class A Augusta GreenJackets, batting .275 in 111 games. In 2004, he split time across the GCL Red Sox (batting .400 in 6 games), the Class A-Advanced Sarasota Red Sox (.310 in 62 games), and the Double-A Portland Sea Dogs (.310 in 32 games). Ramírez was rated by Baseball America as the number ten prospect in baseball prior to the 2005 season, and with the Sea Dogs that year he was selected as an Eastern League All-Star while hitting .271 in 122 games.

=== Boston Red Sox (2005) ===
Ramírez made his MLB debut on September 20, 2005, against the Tampa Bay Devil Rays, entering the game as a defensive replacement in the bottom of the seventh inning and then striking out in his first at bat in the top of the eighth inning against Tim Corcoran. Ramírez appeared in only one other game that season, striking out again in one at-bat.

=== Florida / Miami Marlins (2006–2012) ===
==== 2006 season ====
After the 2005 season, the Red Sox traded Ramírez, along with Aníbal Sánchez, Jesús Delgado, and Harvey García, to the Florida Marlins in exchange for Josh Beckett, Mike Lowell, and Guillermo Mota. During spring training, Ramírez was impressive enough to earn the starting shortstop job over Robert Andino. On April 3, he recorded his first Major League hit in his first at-bat of the season, a single to center field off of Houston Astros pitcher Roy Oswalt. On April 18, he led off the game with his first Major League home run off of Eric Milton of the Cincinnati Reds. He hit his second home run in the seventh inning of that game against reliever Mike Burns.

Ramírez led all MLB rookies with 185 hits, 119 runs, 11 triples and 51 stolen bases. He hit seven leadoff home runs, the most in team history for a season and a career. Ramírez's 46 doubles in the 2006 season is the all-time NL record for a shortstop aged 22 or younger. He was the first NL rookie to post at least 110 runs and at least 50 stolen bases. He became just the fifth big-league player since 1900 to hit at least 45 doubles and steal at least 50 bases, joining Ty Cobb, Tris Speaker, Craig Biggio, and Lou Brock. He finished the season as the NL Rookie of the Year Award named by the Baseball Writers' Association of America.

==== 2007 season ====
During his sophomore season, Ramírez picked up where he left off. The ever-improving young star was hitting .331 with 14 home runs and 35 RBIs to go along with 27 steals at the All-Star break. Despite his numbers, he did not make the All-Star roster.

Marlins manager Fredi González experimented with Ramírez in the number three slot in the lineup, batting him ahead of Mike Jacobs when injuries hit the Marlins position players. Gonzalez believed Ramírez could be a middle-of-the-lineup player because of his ability to hit for power.

In a game against the Cincinnati Reds on July 22, 2007, Ramírez overextended his shoulder when he tried to hit a pitch on the low outside corner off right-hander Bronson Arroyo. He was helped off the field and was determined to have suffered a partial dislocation of his left shoulder.

In 154 games Ramírez batted .332 with 29 home runs, 81 RBIs, 125 runs and 51 steals. He joined the 20–50 club, falling one home run shy of becoming only the third player in baseball history to hit 30 or more home runs and steal 50 or more bases in the same season. Ramírez led the National League in VORP.

After the end of the season, Ramírez underwent arthroscopic surgery to repair his injured left shoulder.

==== 2008 season ====
Entering the 2008 season, after the Marlins traded All-Stars Miguel Cabrera and Dontrelle Willis to the Detroit Tigers, Ramírez was now one of the faces of the franchise. Ramírez contributed well to the Marlins' fast start, earning a spot as the starting shortstop for the National League All-Star team for the first time in his career. He went 2 for 3 with two singles and a run in the 2008 All-Star Game.

In addition, Ramírez agreed to a six-year, $70 million extension, by far the richest contract in Marlins history.

Ramírez was named NL Player of the Month in June. He had been batting .298 with six doubles, a triple and ten home runs. He led the NL in home runs, runs scored and total bases.

Ramírez hit his 30th home run of the season on September 13 and joined Preston Wilson as the only Marlins to become members of the 30–30 club. He ended the season with 33 home runs and 35 stolen bases. He recorded only 67 RBI, the fewest ever in a 30–30 season.

==== 2009 season ====
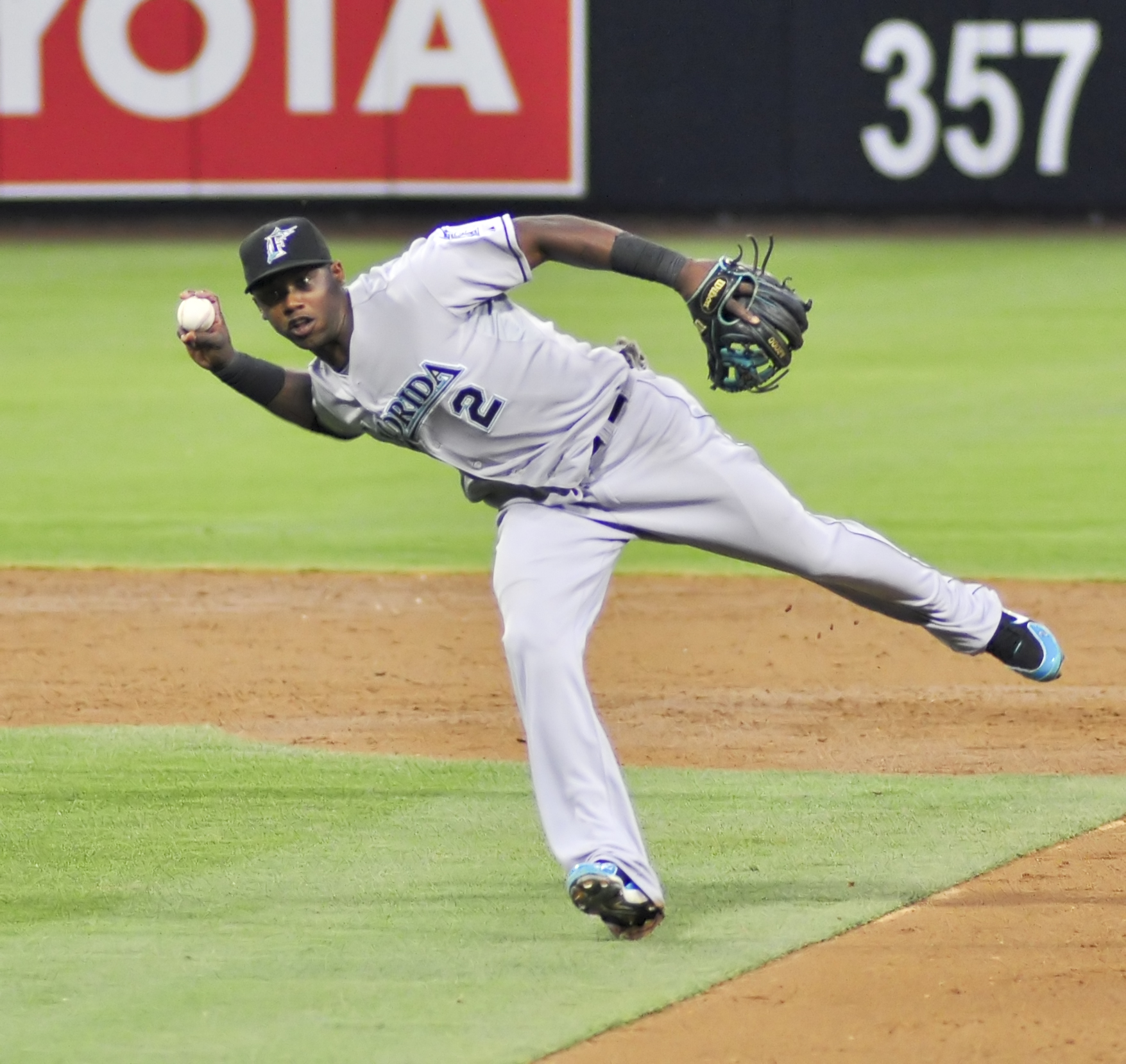
Ramírez playing for the Florida Marlins in 2009

Ramírez played in the World Baseball Classic for his native Dominican Republic prior to the 2009 season.

During the April 6, 2009 regular season opener against the Washington Nationals, Ramírez hit his first career grand-slam off of Washington reliever Steven Shell. On July 5, 2009, Ramírez was the NL starting shortstop for the 2009 All-Star Game. On September 6, against the Nationals, Ramírez hit his 100th home run of his MLB career, becoming the fourth quickest shortstop in terms of games played to reach that milestone (Alex Rodriguez, Nomar Garciaparra, and Ernie Banks). With a batting average of .342, Ramírez won his first batting title. He recorded 106 RBIs (sixth in NL), stole 27 bases (fifth in NL), and scored 101 times (eighth in NL). He won the Silver Slugger Award at shortstop, and came in second to Albert Pujols for NL MVP.

==== 2010 season ====
On May 17, 2010, in a home game against the Arizona Diamondbacks, Ramírez fouled a ball off his ankle in his first at-bat. He looked as if he was in some pain but remained in the game. He then grounded into a double play to end the inning and ran slowly to first base. The next inning, with runners on first and second, Ramírez failed to catch a bloop fly ball to shallow left field and inadvertently kicked the ball into the left-field corner. He then jogged after the ball as two runs scored and the batter advanced all the way to third base. Manager Fredi González removed Ramírez from the game, and a war of words led to Ramírez being benched for the next game. In his first game back against the St. Louis Cardinals, Ramírez went 3–for-5 with an RBI. About a month later, Gonzalez was fired.

Ramírez was voted in as a starter for the 2010 All Star game for the third year in a row. He was also chosen to participate in the State Farm Home Run Derby for the first time in his career. In the Derby, he came in second place to Boston's David Ortiz.

Ramírez hit his 25th career leadoff home run on August 7 against the St. Louis Cardinals, and in the bottom of the 10th inning of the same game, he got his first career walk-off hit, ending a 5-game Marlins losing streak with an RBI double to right-center field.

On September 15 in a game against the Philadelphia Phillies, Ramírez aggravated an injury in his elbow he had sustained earlier in the season while swinging. He attempted to come back and play a week later, but after one game, he was still in pain and was shut down for the rest of the season. He finished 2010 with a .300 batting average, 21 home runs, 76 RBI, 32 steals and 92 runs scored.

==== 2011 season ====
During the 2011 season, Ramírez performed below his usual level of play. By June 20, Ramírez was hitting just .200 with only 4 home runs and 17 RBI. However, he raised his stats up to .243 with 8 home runs and 37 RBIs by July 9. For the first time in his career, Ramírez hit cleanup. He injured himself after trying to make a diving catch in a game against the New York Mets on August 2, aggravating a shoulder injury that had plagued him in 2010. He missed the rest of 2011 and needed surgery in the off-season. He finished the season having played in only 92 games with a batting average of .243, 10 HR, and 45 RBI. The Marlins, who were 55–55 at the time of the injury, finished 72–90.

==== 2012 season ====
During the 2011–2012 off-season, the Marlins, during their rebuilding stage, acquired shortstop José Reyes, who was the reigning National League batting champ. After the signing, reports circulated that Ramírez was unhappy with being forced to change positions to third base.

After a slow start, Ramírez finished strong in May with 11 home runs and 37 RBIs. On July 13, 2012, Ramírez was dropped from second in the batting order to fifth to start the second half of the season.

=== Los Angeles Dodgers (2012–2014) ===
On July 25, 2012, Ramírez was traded to the Los Angeles Dodgers with Randy Choate in exchange for Nathan Eovaldi and minor league pitching prospect Scott McGough. At the time of his trade, Ramírez was batting .246 with 14 home runs and 48 RBIs and had recorded 14 stolen bases.

==== 2012 season ====
Ramírez hit a triple in his first at-bat with the Dodgers, finishing his Dodgers debut 2-for-4 with an RBI and a run scored in a loss to the St. Louis Cardinals. He hit his first home run for the Dodgers on July 27, winning the first game of a series against the San Francisco Giants. In 64 games, he hit .271 with 10 homers and 44 RBI. He had three walk-off hits in 2012, the most in MLB.

==== 2013 season ====
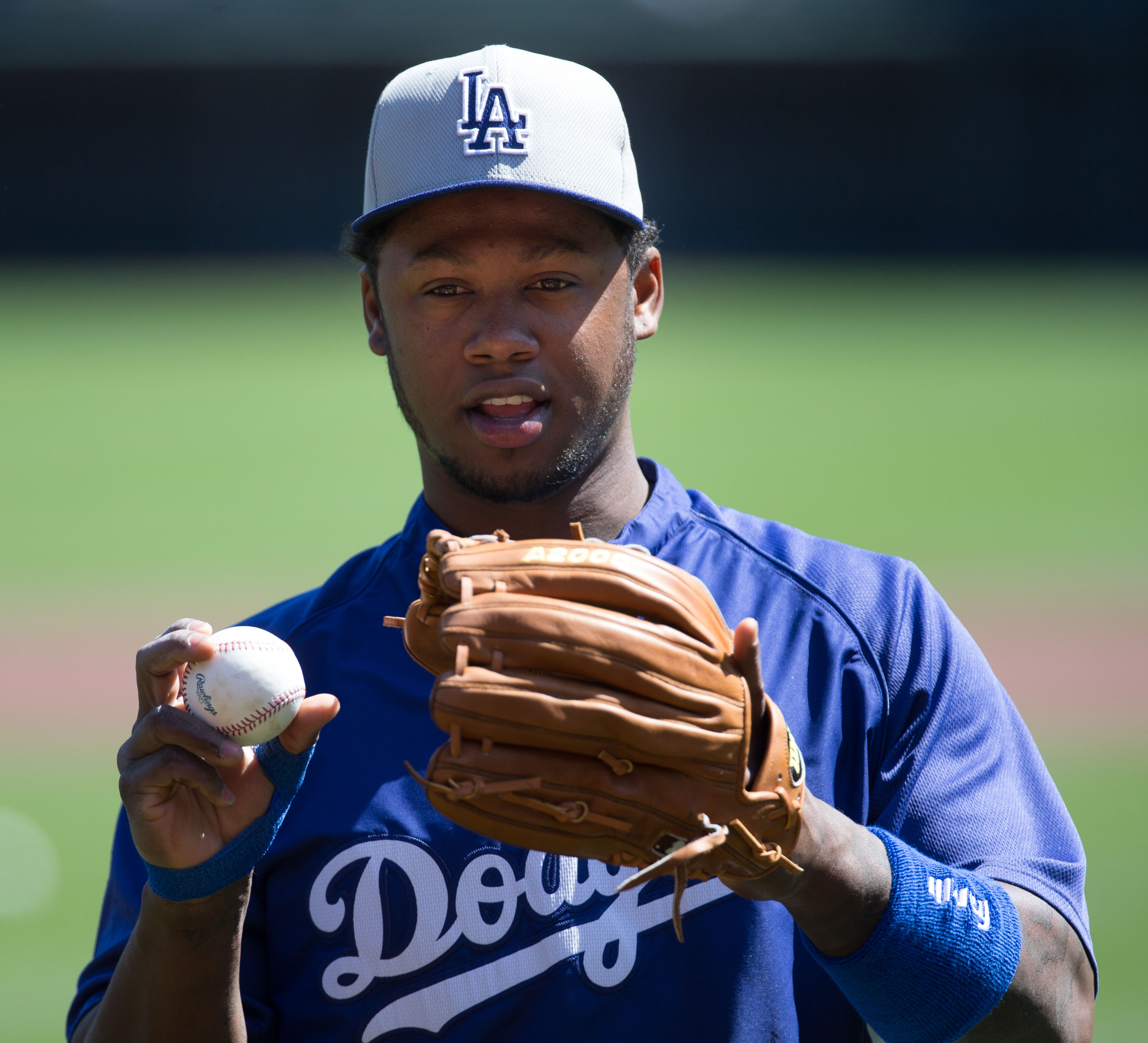
Ramírez with the Los Angeles Dodgers in April 2013.

He played with the Dominican team during the 2013 World Baseball Classic. In the championship game against Puerto Rico he injured his hand while diving for a ball. An MRI the next day revealed a torn thumb ligament which would require surgery. The Dodgers announced that he would miss the first two months of the season while recovering, however, he rejoined the Dodgers on April 29, earlier than expected.

In just his third start after returning, Ramírez suffered a hamstring injury while running the bases on May 3 and returned to the disabled list. He eventually rejoined the Dodgers on June 4. His return from the disabled list reignited the Dodgers offense and they started to get hot, which included a 46–10 record from mid-June to mid-August and they went from last place to winning the National League West. Ramírez, in just 86 games, hit .345 with 20 home runs and 57 RBI and reached the playoffs for the first time in his career.

In the 2013 National League Division Series against the Atlanta Braves, Ramírez went 8 for 16 with six extra-base hits, tying a franchise postseason record. In Game 1 of the 2013 National League Championship Series, Ramírez was hit by a fastball on a 1-2 count in the first inning, fracturing two ribs and taking him out of the series, which the Dodgers lost in six games.

==== 2014 season ====
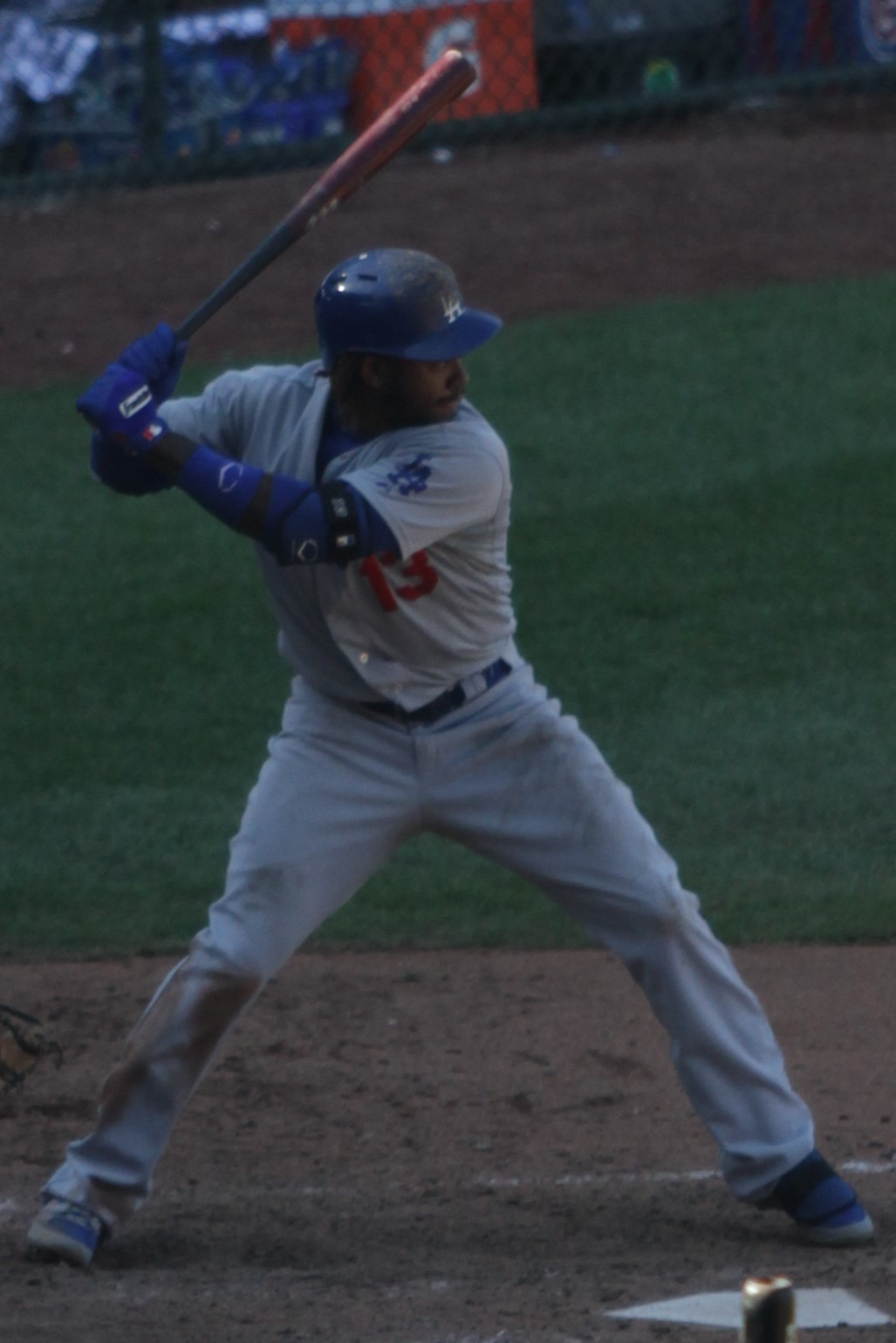
Ramírez with the Dodgers

In the last year of his contract, Ramírez dealt with several injuries throughout the season. He finished the regular season hitting .283 with 13 home runs and 71 RBI in 128 games. On August 2, Ramírez hit his first career walk-off home run off of the Cubs' Blake Parker in the 12th inning. He became a free agent after the season, although the Dodgers did extend a qualifying offer to him.

In the latter half of his career, Ramírez gained a reputation as a defensive liability at shortstop. He ended Clayton Kershaw's bid for a perfect game on June 18 by committing a throwing error in the top of the seventh inning. After the error, manager Don Mattingly replaced Ramírez with SS Carlos Triunfel for defensive purposes.

=== Second stint with Boston Red Sox (2015–2018) ===
On November 25, 2014, Ramírez signed a four-year, $88 million deal with a fifth year vesting option worth $22 million to return to the Boston Red Sox. They announced plans to play him in left field, even though he had only previously played shortstop and third base in his career.

==== 2015 season ====
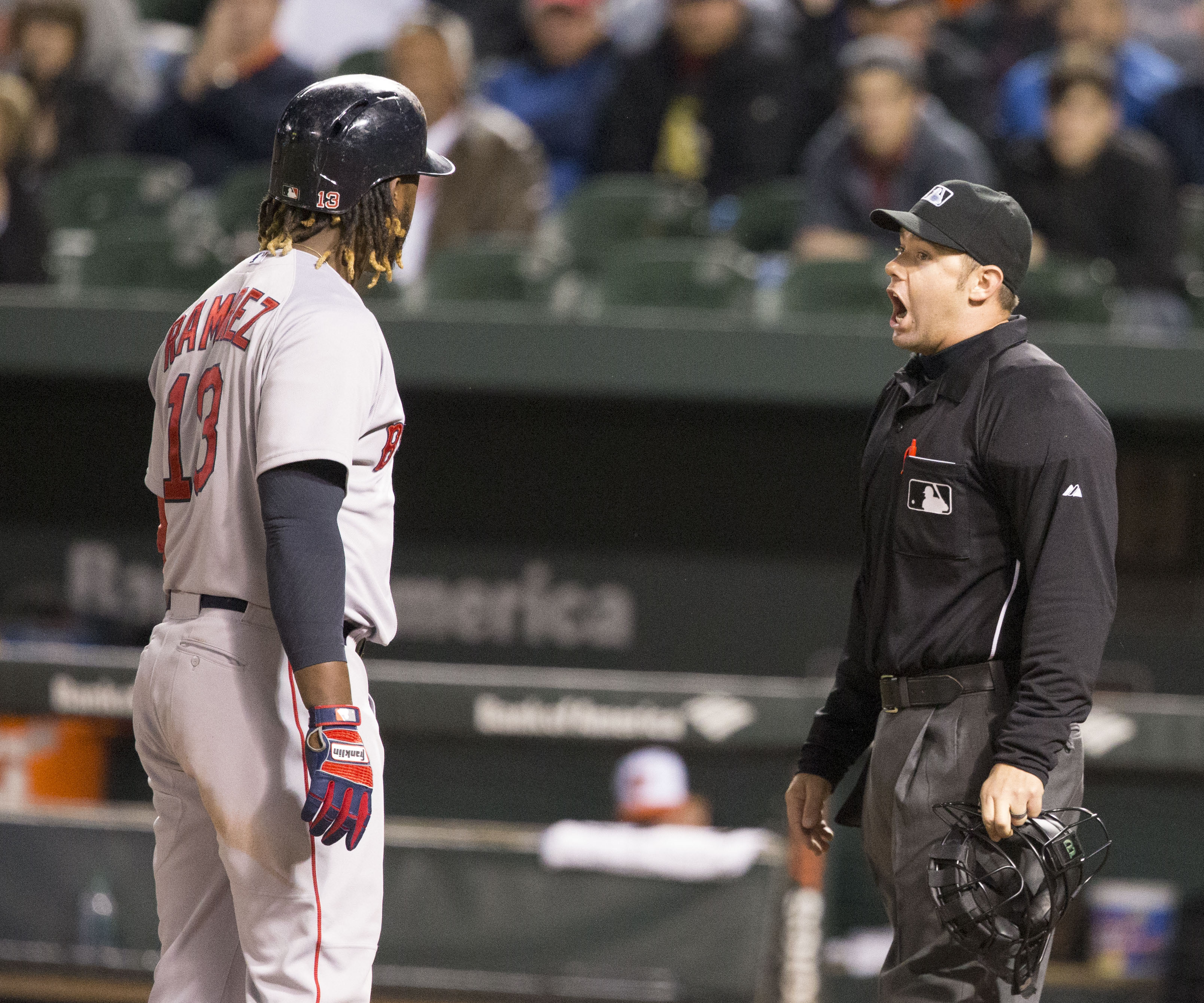
Ramírez talking with umpire Will Little.

On Opening Day of the 2015 season, in his first game with Boston in almost 10 years, Ramírez played left field for the first time in his career and hit two home runs (one of them a broken-bat grand slam) for a total of 5 RBI as the Red Sox routed the Philadelphia Phillies 8–0. On April 29, Ramírez hit his 10th home run of the season, joining teammate David Ortiz as the only players in Red Sox history to hit 10 home runs in the month of April. However, a few days later on May 4, Ramírez left the game against the Tampa Bay Rays in the top of the first inning after crashing into the left field wall at Fenway Park. The team announced shortly after that he had suffered a left shoulder sprain.

Ramírez ended the 2015 season with a .249 batting average and 19 home runs in 401 at-bats, while his defense in left field was rated as the worst in the American League. As a result, on September 1 the Red Sox announced Ramírez would not play left field for the remainder of the season. The Red Sox also announced then that Ramírez would again change positions in 2016 to become their starting first baseman, another position that Ramírez had never played before.

==== 2016 season ====
Ramírez reported early to 2016 spring training with the Red Sox and dismissed his impending positional switch to first base as nothing hard. Once the season began, the transition was well received by the press and clubhouse, with praise going to his improved defense and greater comfort in the infield.

On July 20, 2016, Ramírez belted three two-run home runs in Boston's 11–7 interleague play victory against the San Francisco Giants at Fenway Park. Then on August 12, he hit a pair of three-run home runs as the Red Sox beat the visiting Arizona Diamondbacks, 9–4, in an interleague game. It was his 20th career multi-homer game, while his six runs batted in matched a career high.

On September 15, 2016, Ramírez hit a walk off three-run home run to complete a comeback against the Yankees, marking the beginning of an eleven-game win streak.

On October 2, 2016, Ramírez hit his 30th home run of the season. Ramírez, Mookie Betts and David Ortiz became the first trio in Red Sox history with 30 home runs and more than 100 RBIs in the same season. Ramírez would finish the season with a .286 batting average and 111 RBI, a new career high.

==== 2017 season ====
With the retirement of David Ortiz and the offseason addition of first baseman Mitch Moreland, Ramírez took on the role of designated hitter for the Red Sox. He had his lowest major league batting average as part of a .242/.320/.429 slash line, with 23 home runs, 62 RBI, and just one stolen base (the lowest total of his career) while playing only 18 games in the field, all at first base). In the postseason, Ramírez batted 8-for-14 (.571) in the 2017 ALDS as the Red Sox lost to the eventual World Series champions, the Houston Astros. These last at bats of his post-season career raised his batting average to .380, which is just behind hall-of-famer Lou Brock for best post-season average of all time with at least 60 at bats.

==== 2018 season ====
In 2018, Ramírez batted .330 for the month of April, but struggled in May, batting .163. On May 25, Ramírez was designated for assignment by the Red Sox as the team activated Dustin Pedroia from the disabled list. He was released on May 30. In 2018, he had a career-low 177 at-bats, in which he batted .254/.313/.395 with a career-low .708 OPS.

Overall, in Ramírez's second stint with the Red Sox (2015–18), he batted .260 with 78 home runs and 255 RBIs in 429 games. His salary in 2018 was $22 million.

=== Cleveland Indians (2019) ===
On February 26, 2019, Ramírez signed a minor league contract with the Cleveland Indians, which included an invitation to the team's 2019 major league spring training camp. The Indians purchased Ramírez's contract on March 28. In 16 games with Cleveland, Ramírez batted 9-for-49 (.184) with two home runs and eight RBIs, and had the slowest average home run trot of all major league players for the season, at 29.2 seconds. The Indians designated Ramírez for assignment on April 20. After clearing waivers, Ramírez elected free agency on April 22, 2019.

== Personal life ==
Ramírez and his wife, Sanoe (Elisabeth), have three children. Ramírez enjoys reggae music and DJing, as well as listening to merengue and bachata music.

He maintains a close friendship with former teammate and fellow Dominican David Ortiz.

In June 2018, shortly after his release by the Red Sox, Ramírez was briefly reported to have a possible connection with a federal and state investigation into a drug ring based out of Lawrence, Massachusetts. Within days, it was clarified that Ramírez was not linked to the investigation and that a person arrested in the case had used his name "to get the cops off his back, which didn't work."

In April 2019, Ramírez became a naturalized United States citizen.

== See also ==
- List of Dominican Americans
- List of Major League Baseball annual runs scored leaders
- List of Major League Baseball batting champions
- List of Major League Baseball career runs scored leaders
- List of Major League Baseball career home run leaders
- List of Major League Baseball players from the Dominican Republic
- List of Miami Marlins team records
- Miami Marlins award winners and league leaders

Awards and achievements
Preceded by Lance Berkman	NL Player of the Month; June 2008	Succeeded by Ryan Braun
