= Jesús Delgado =

Panama Footballer (born 2001)

- Relief pitcher
- Born: April 19, 1984 (age 42); Maracay, Venezuela
- Batted: Right Threw: Right

MLB debut
- September 17, 2008, for the Florida Marlins

Last MLB appearance
- September 23, 2008, for the Florida Marlins

MLB statistics
- Win–loss record: 0–0
- Earned run average: 4.50
- Strikeouts: 0
- Stats at Baseball Reference

Teams
- Florida Marlins (2008)

Jesús Andrés Delgado Corrales (born April 19, 1984) is a Venezuelan former professional baseball pitcher and current coach in the Texas Rangers organization. He played in Major League Baseball (MLB) for the Florida Marlins. He also played for the Rojos del Aguila de Veracruz and the Leones de Yucatan of the Mexican Baseball League.

== Professional career ==
=== Boston Red Sox ===
He was signed by Red Sox as non-drafted free agent on February 20, 2001. In his first year in 2001 he went 0–2 with 5.34 ERA in 10 games (eight starts) in the Dominican Summer League. He also participated in Fall Instructional League. Delgado missed the 2002 season due to elbow injury that required surgery on Ulnar Collateral Ligament, more commonly known as Tommy John surgery. He also missed the 2003 season recovering from the injury. He spent time with the Single-A Augusta GreenJackets and the Red Sox Gulf Coast League affiliate. Delgado went 1–5 with 5.22 ERA in 21 games (16 starts) with Augusta. He had a 2.77 ERA in 13 games on road, and 10.07 ERA in eight games at home. Placed on the disabled list from July 10 to August 22, and made one rehab start with the GCL Red Sox where he allowed two earned runs in 1.2 innings. Later that season, he participated in the Fall Instructional League and he also pitched for Aragua in the Venezuelan Winter League. In 2005 Delgado spent his entire season with the Single-A Greenville Drive, where he went 7–3 with two saves and 3.50 ERA in 33 games.

=== Florida Marlins ===
He was acquired from Red Sox with Hanley Ramírez, Aníbal Sánchez and Harvey García in exchange for Josh Beckett, Mike Lowell and Guillermo Mota on November 24, 2005.

=== Seattle Mariners ===
On March 15, 2009, Delgado was claimed off waivers by the Seattle Mariners.

=== Cincinnati Reds ===
On January 20, 2010, Delgado signed a minor league contract with the Cincinnati Reds.

=== Rojos del Aguila de Veracruz ===
On March 18, 2011, Delgado signed with the Rojos del Aguila de Veracruz of the Mexican Baseball League. He was released on July 26, 2011.

=== Leones de Yucatan ===
On March 16, 2012, Delgado signed with the Leones de Yucatan of the Mexican Baseball League. He was released on April 6, 2012.

=== T & A San Marino ===
In June 2014, Delgado signed with T & A San Marino of the Italian Baseball League.

== Coaching career ==
Delgado joined the Texas Rangers organization as a coach in 2017, and has been as the pitching coach of the DSL Rangers (2) since 2017.

Is currently working in Kansas City Royals Organization. https://www.royalsreview.com/royals-minor-leagues-prospects/92666/royals-announce-2026-minor-league-coaching-staffs

== Personal life ==
He graduated from U.E. Torres Bina in 2002.

== See also ==
- List of Major League Baseball players from Venezuela
