= Bobo Leonard =

- Outfielder
- Born: February 3, 1898; Greenville, South Carolina, U.S.
- Died: October 19, 1983 (aged 85); Cleveland, Ohio, U.S.
- Batted: Unknown Threw: Unknown

Negro league baseball debut
- 1921, for the Cleveland Tate Stars

Last appearance
- 1928, for the Homestead Grays

Negro National League I & Eastern Colored League statistics
- Batting average: .261
- Home runs: 6
- Runs batted in: 58

Teams
- Cleveland Tate Stars (1921-1923); Cleveland Browns (1924); Chicago American Giants (1924); Lincoln Giants (1924); Indianapolis ABCs (1924); Baltimore Black Sox (1924-1925); Atlantic City Bacharach Giants (1925); Cleveland Elites (1926); Cleveland Hornets (1927); Homestead Grays (1928)

James "Bobo" Leonard (born James Jesse Lenhardt; February 3, 1898 – October 19, 1983) was an American professional baseball outfielder in the Negro leagues. He played from 1921 to 1928, spending time with several clubs, including three seasons with the Cleveland Tate Stars.

In 1924, Leonard set the major league record (Note: Since Negro League Baseball statistics were not recognized as part of the Major League Baseball record until 2024, the record was not recognized until 100 years after Leonard set it.) for most franchises played for in a single season, appearing with five major league teams across two recognized Negro leagues: the New York Lincoln Giants and Baltimore Black Sox of the Eastern Colored League (ECL) and the Chicago American Giants, Indianapolis ABCs, and Cleveland Browns of the Negro National League I (NNL). This record stood for 94 seasons until it was matched by Oliver Drake in 2018; Mike Baumann (2024) and José Ureña (2025) have also matched the record.
