= Josh Beckett =

American baseball pitcher (born 1980)

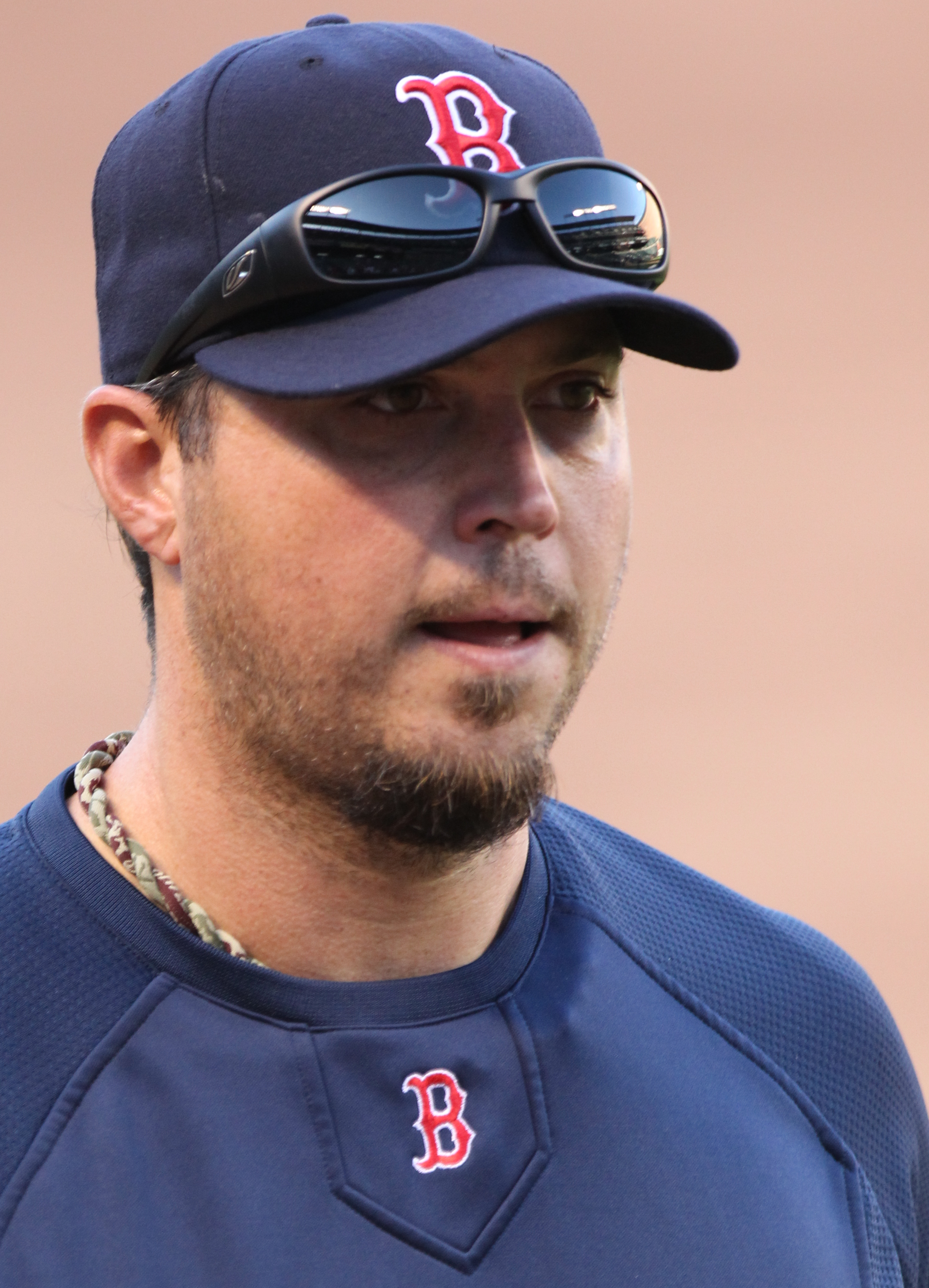
- Beckett with the Red Sox in 2011
- Pitcher
- Born: May 15, 1980 (age 46); Spring, Texas, U.S.
- Batted: Right Threw: Right

MLB debut
- September 4, 2001, for the Florida Marlins

Last MLB appearance
- August 3, 2014, for the Los Angeles Dodgers

MLB statistics
- Win–loss record: 138–106
- Earned run average: 3.88
- Strikeouts: 1,901
- Stats at Baseball Reference

Teams
- Florida Marlins (2001–2005); Boston Red Sox (2006–2012); Los Angeles Dodgers (2012–2014)

Career highlights and awards
- 3× All-Star (2007, 2009, 2011); 2× World Series champion (2003, 2007); World Series MVP (2003); ALCS MVP (2007); MLB wins leader (2007); Pitched a no-hitter on May 25, 2014; Marlins Legends Hall of Fame

Joshua Patrick Beckett (born May 15, 1980) is an American former professional baseball pitcher in Major League Baseball (MLB). A three-time MLB All-Star, he played for the Florida Marlins, the Boston Red Sox, and the Los Angeles Dodgers.

After a stellar high school career in which he was regarded as one of the top baseball prospects in the U.S., Beckett was drafted by the Marlins with the second overall pick in the 1999 MLB draft. He won the 2003 World Series with the Marlins and the 2007 World Series with the Red Sox, receiving the 2003 World Series MVP award and the 2007 American League Championship Series MVP award. Beckett was traded from the Marlins to the Red Sox in 2006 and from the Red Sox to the Dodgers in 2012, both as part of multi-player transactions.

Beckett recovered from a serious injury that caused him to miss most of the 2013 season. He pitched a no-hitter for the Dodgers against the Philadelphia Phillies on May 25, 2014, becoming the 19th man in Dodgers history to pitch a no-hitter. However, his season was again cut short due to an injury, and he announced his retirement on October 7, 2014.

== Early life ==
Beckett grew up idolizing fellow Texans Nolan Ryan and Roger Clemens. As a youth, he starred on Little League All-Star teams. He later attended Spring High School in Spring, Texas. He had trouble with grades and with paying attention to his coach during his freshman year, so his coach in frustration threw Beckett off the team. He experienced a growth spurt before his sophomore year and added speed to his fastball. He also raised his GPA and was able to get back on the team, where he had a 9–3 record with a 1.18 earned run average (ERA) as a sophomore, tossing three no-hitters.

As a high school junior, Beckett was ranked by Baseball America as the top high school prospect in the nation, and his team as the top high school baseball team. He compiled a 13–2 record and struck out 2.1 batters per inning while walking only 20 batters all season. His high school coach said, "I’ve never seen a pitcher with his ability—ever."

In his senior season, Beckett, by this point nicknamed "Kid Heat," was named the High School player of the year by USA Today. Beckett signed a letter of intent to pitch for Texas A&M University, but he and Josh Hamilton were seen as the top two players available in the 1999 Major League Baseball draft. Concerned about Beckett's perceived arrogance, the Tampa Bay Devil Rays chose Hamilton with the first pick. Beckett, meanwhile, was chosen with the second pick by the Florida Marlins. Marlins scouting director Al Avila said at the time, "Beckett has good size and has an overpowering fastball. He's a bulldog on the mound." Showing his confidence, Beckett predicted that he would make it to the major leagues within two years and play in an All-Star game by 2001.

== Baseball career ==
=== Florida Marlins (1999–2005) ===
==== Minor leagues ====
Beckett engaged in protracted negotiations with the Marlins, during which he briefly enrolled at Blinn Junior College, but he eventually signed on August 28, 1999, to a four-year $7 million contract that included a $3.625 million signing bonus. His signing bonus was larger than what the Marlins were paying everyone on the Major League roster, except pitcher Alex Fernandez.

Beckett impressed the Marlins in his first spring training with the team in March 2000, with a fastball clocked at 94–96 miles per hour (151–154 km/h) and a good curveball. He also showed his commitment to the team by donating $100,000 to the team's charitable foundation, more than any other player had donated. He was assigned to the Kane County Cougars of the Class A Midwest League to make his professional debut. As the Opening Day starter for the Cougars, he pitched four innings and allowed only one run, on a double by Albert Pujols. Beckett suffered from injuries that season, including shoulder tendinitis and a frayed rotator cuff, injuries which took longer to heal because he did too much weight lifting while on the disabled list. He would later say, "I tried to get too strong too quick and ended up making things worse." He pitched in 13 games for the Cougars and finished with a record of 2–3 with a 2.12 ERA and 61 strikeouts. He was selected by Baseball America as the Marlins best prospect and the 19th best in the entire minor leagues as well as having the best fastball in the Midwest League. He was also selected to play in the All-Star Futures Game, a showcase for the best prospects.

The Marlins assigned Beckett to the Brevard County Manatees of the Florida State League at the start of the 2001 season. He didn't allow an earned run in his first 38 2/3 innings and went 6–0 with a 1.23 ERA and 101 strikeouts in 13 games. Marlins General Manager Dave Dombrowski remarked on his progress, "He pitched as well in the Florida State League as any prospect I've ever been associated with", leading to a promotion to the Double A Portland Sea Dogs of the Eastern League. Beckett struck out eight of the first nine batters he faced in his Sea Dogs debut on June 16, 2001. On August 13, 2001, he combined with two other Sea Dogs pitchers to throw a no-hitter against the Binghamton Mets. In 13 starts for the team, he had an 8–1 record, a 1.82 ERA and struck out 102 batters.

He was selected as Minor League Player of the Year by Baseball America, The Sporting News, and USA Today. Baseball America also ranked him as the Marlins' best prospect and the third best in all of baseball, while the Marlins named him as their organizational minor league player of the year.

==== Major leagues ====
Beckett's MLB debut was on September 4, 2001, against the Chicago Cubs, in which he gave up one hit over six shutout innings to pick up his first MLB win. He also doubled and scored in the game. Beckett was quoted afterwards as saying, "It was fun. I'm ready for my next one." He did not allow a run in his first 10 innings before giving up a two-run homer to Vladimir Guerrero on September 19 against the Montreal Expos. He finished 2001 with four games started, a 2–2 record, and an ERA of 1.50.

Hampered by blister problems in 2002, Beckett's highlight was on July 21, when he struck out 12 Expos in one game, combining with a couple of relief pitchers on a Marlins record 17 strikeouts in a nine-inning game. In 23 appearances for the Marlins in 2002, which included two relief appearances, he was 6–7 with a 4.10 ERA and 113 strikeouts.

Beckett was named the Marlins opening day starting pitcher in 2003, and at 22 years old, he was the youngest opening day starter in the team's history. However, he lasted just 2 2/3 innings in the game as the Philadelphia Phillies scored five unearned runs in the third as a result of two errors and a passed ball. He subsequently went on the disabled list (DL) with a sprained right elbow in mid-May, part of a string of team injuries that contributed to the firing of Manager Jeff Torborg. He returned from his injury on July 1 and finished the season with a 9–8 record, a 3.04 ERA and 152 strikeouts.

Beckett made his postseason debut in the opening game of the 2003 National League (NL) Division Series, where he allowed only one run in seven innings against the San Francisco Giants but picked up the loss as Jason Schmidt pitched a complete-game shutout. However, the Marlins came back to win the series in four games. His next start, in game one of the 2003 NL Championship Series against the Chicago Cubs, did not go well as he allowed four runs in the first inning, two of them on a home run by Moisés Alou, and six runs in his 6 1/3 innings. The Marlins battled back and won the game in extra innings. The Cubs took the next three games and only needed one more win to take the series when Beckett returned to the mound in game five. He allowed only three Cubs to reach base in the game, on two singles and a walk, in the complete-game shutout to keep his team alive. The Marlins took game six also, thanks partly to the infamous Steve Bartman incident. In game seven, on two days rest, Beckett came in out of the bullpen to pitch four innings and the Marlins won 9–6 to clinch the National League championship.

Beckett won the 2003 World Series MVP Award with two strong performances, one of which was on three days' rest, as the Marlins defeated the New York Yankees. In game three, he struck out 10 and allowed only two runs in 7 1/3 innings. Then in game six at Yankee Stadium, he shut out the Yankees in a complete game, striking out nine batters and clinching the series by tagging Jorge Posada for the final out.

Beckett made the opening day start for the Marlins again in 2004, allowing one run in seven innings against the Expos. He made three trips to the DL during the season, but still pitched a career-high 26 starts and 156 2/3 innings. He was 9–9 with a 3.79 ERA and had 152 strikeouts for the second year in a row but the Marlins faltered down the stretch and did not make the postseason. In 2005, he was 15–8 with a 3.38 ERA and 166 strikeouts in 29 games.

In his five seasons with the Marlins, Beckett had a 41–34 record, a 3.46 ERA and struck out a total of 607 batters in 106 games. In his final start as a Marlin, on September 23, 2005, against the Atlanta Braves, he struck out six in seven shutout innings but earned a no decision in a game the Marlins eventually lost.

=== Boston Red Sox (2006–2012) ===
In a deal that was made official on Thanksgiving Day 2005, Beckett was traded to the Boston Red Sox along with third baseman Mike Lowell and relief pitcher Guillermo Mota for minor league shortstop Hanley Ramírez (the top prospect in the Red Sox system at the time) and pitchers Aníbal Sánchez, Jesús Delgado and Harvey García. Beckett and Lowell were among a prominent list of veterans the Marlins traded in an effort to shed salary. This was organizationally termed a market correction. In his first start with the Red Sox, Beckett allowed only one run in seven innings to pick up the win against the Texas Rangers on April 5, 2006.

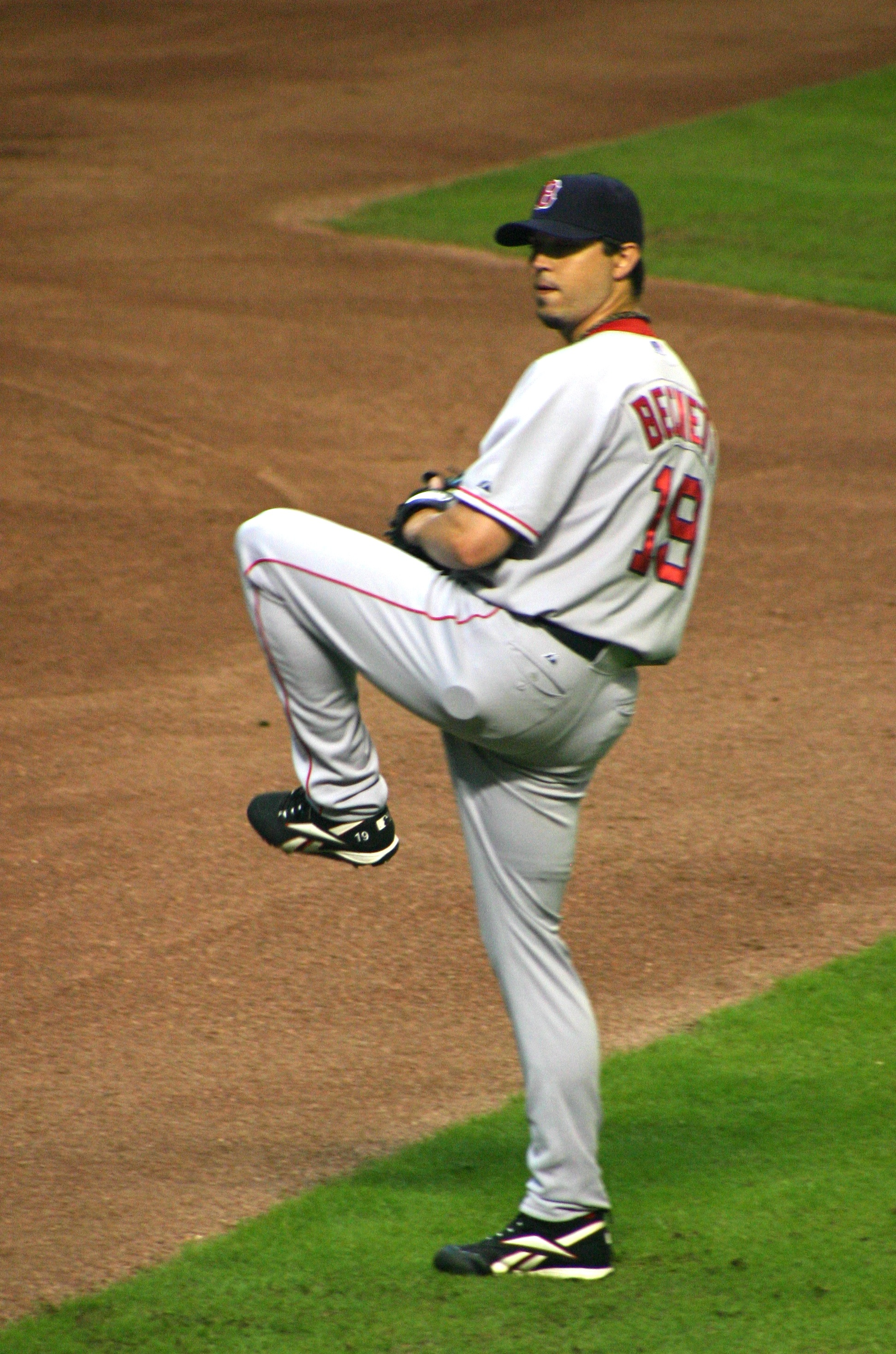
Beckett during his tenure with the Boston Red Sox in 2008

Beckett was the first Red Sox pitcher to hit a home run in 35 years — since the advent of the designated hitter rule — when he took Phillies' pitcher Brett Myers deep during an interleague game on May 20, 2006. On July 18, he signed a three-year, $30 million contract extension with a $10 million club option for 2010. Beckett completed his first season with the Red Sox with a record of 16–11 and a 5.01 ERA. In 204 2/3 innings, he gave up 191 hits and struck out 158 batters while walking 74. He also allowed 36 home runs, tied for second most in the majors.

At the start of the 2007 season, Beckett adjusted to throwing more breaking pitches and fewer fastballs. At the same time, he learned to locate his pitches rather than simply get strikes by power. He reduced his walks and home runs allowed by nearly half, contributing to his success in 2007. Beckett became one of six Red Sox pitchers in history to win their first seven starts. George Winter and Mickey Harris both won their first seven starts in a season, and Babe Ruth, Dave Ferriss and Roger Moret all won their first eight starts in a season. After a strong first half, posting a 12–2 record with a 3.44 ERA, he was selected to the American League team in the 2007 MLB All-Star Game. Beckett earned the victory in the game after pitching two innings, giving up only one hit, and striking out two. Beckett became the first pitcher to win 20 games in a season since 2005, finishing the season with a record of 20–7, a 3.27 ERA, 194 strikeouts, a 1.14 WHIP, and only 40 walks and 17 home runs allowed. He finished second in AL Cy Young Award voting, behind CC Sabathia.

Beckett threw a shutout against the Anaheim Angels on 108 pitches, 83 of which were strikes, to start the 2007 American League Division Series. Nine days later, Beckett started the first game of the 2007 American League Championship Series (ALCS) and pitched six innings for the win and in game five he struck out 11 in eight innings. Beckett's 2–0 record and 1.93 ERA against the Cleveland Indians earned him the 2007 ALCS MVP Award. He then started and won the first game of the 2007 World Series against the Colorado Rockies, pitching seven innings, allowing one run on six hits, and striking out nine batters. Boston would go on to sweep the Rockies in the series.

On May 8, 2008, Beckett recorded his 1,000th career strikeout, when Brandon Inge of the Detroit Tigers struck out swinging in the seventh inning. He was 12–10 with a 4.03 ERA in 27 starts. In game three of the 2008 American League Division Series against the Anaheim Angels he allowed four runs in five innings He then made two starts in the 2008 ALCS against the Tampa Bay Rays and was 1–0 but had a high 9.64 ERA.

In 2009, during his first Opening Day start with the Red Sox, Beckett struck out 10 through seven innings allowing only one run and two hits in a 5–3 victory over the Rays. On April 14, 2009, MLB fined and suspended him six games for intentionally throwing over the head of Angels outfielder Bobby Abreu. Beckett later appealed the suspension and got it reduced to five games. On June 20, 2009, he recorded his first complete-game shutout in three years against the Atlanta Braves in a duel against former Red Sox pitcher Derek Lowe. The shutout was his first in a Red Sox uniform. On July 5, 2009, he was selected to represent Boston in the 2009 MLB All Star Game.

Beckett recorded his 100th career win on July 12, 2009, pitching a complete-game shutout against the Kansas City Royals at Fenway Park. On August 7, 2009, against the New York Yankees, he engaged in a pitching duel with former Marlins teammate A. J. Burnett that turned into a fifteen-inning, five-hour-and-thirty-three-minute game. He threw seven shutout innings, Burnett threw 7 2/3. The Red Sox eventually lost the game in the bottom of the 15th, when Alex Rodriguez hit a walk-off two-run home run. He was 17–6 on the season, with a 3.86 ERA and a career-high 199 strikeouts in 32 starts. He lost his one start in the postseason, to the Angels in Game 2 of the 2009 ALDS.

On April 5, 2010, the Red Sox and Beckett agreed to a four-year, $68 million contract extension, through 2014. On May 7, he allowed nine runs, struck out eight and also hit two batters. This was the first time a Major League pitcher had that combination of stats in a single game since Jack Coombs of the Philadelphia Athletics during the 1911 season. He was placed on the disabled list on May 19 with a lower back strain and returned from the injury on July 23. In 21 starts in 2010, he was 6–6 with a 5.78 ERA.

In 2011, he posted career bests in ERA (2.89), opponent batting average (.211) and WHIP (1.03). He was 13–7 in 30 games and was selected to his third All-Star Game. On September 16, he recorded his 1,000th strikeout as a member of the Red Sox against Tampa Bay's Ben Zobrist in the sixth inning. At the end of the 2011 season, the Red Sox collapsed and failed to make the playoffs. Beckett and two more starting pitchers (John Lackey and Jon Lester) were in the center of a controversy where the three drank alcohol, ate fried chicken, and played video games during games where they weren't pitching. Beckett was noted as the leader of this and some cited this behavior as part of the reason for the team's poor play down the stretch.

Beckett struggled in the 2012 season, he went 5–11 with a 5.23 ERA as a Red Sox. He was also the center of yet another controversy when it was reported that he played several rounds of golf despite having been scratched from his start due to a lat muscle injury. In what would turn out to be his final start with the Red Sox, he allowed four runs in six innings on August 19, 2012, against the Yankees. Over seven seasons, he started 194 regular season games for the Red Sox with an 89–58 record, a 4.17 ERA and 1,108 strikeouts.

=== Los Angeles Dodgers (2012–2014) ===
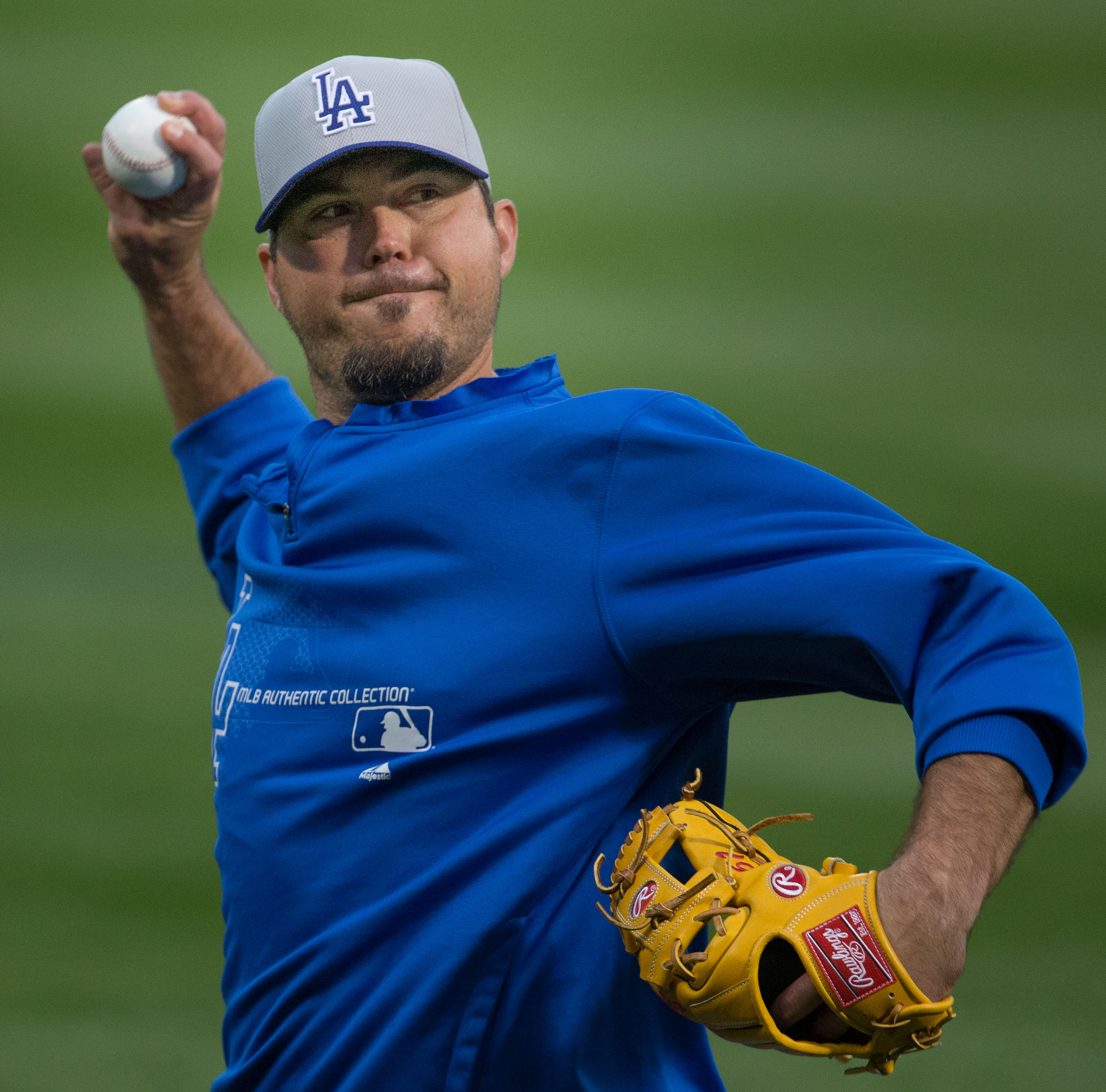
Beckett with the Dodgers on April 19, 2013

On August 25, 2012, Beckett was traded to the Los Angeles Dodgers (along with Adrián González, Carl Crawford and Nick Punto and $11 million in cash) for James Loney, Iván DeJesús, Jr., Allen Webster, and two players to be named later (Jerry Sands and Rubby De La Rosa). He started seven games for the Dodgers after the trade and was 2–3 with a 2.93 ERA.

Beckett struggled in the early part of the 2013 season, posting an 0–5 record and 5.19 ERA in eight starts. He was placed on the disabled list with a groin strain on May 15, his 33rd birthday. While on the disabled list, he began to experience numbness and tingling in his hand so he went to see a nerve specialist and expressed doubt as to whether he would be able to pitch again. The Dodgers shut him down from pitching for a month while he underwent a rigorous rehabilitation program in an effort to avoid season-ending surgery. However, the tingling sensation returned when he attempted to resume his throwing program in late June. He was diagnosed with thoracic outlet syndrome, which required him to undergo surgery on July 10, 2013, that ended his 2013 season.

Beckett's surgery, which included having a rib removed, made him a question mark for the Dodgers heading into 2014. He returned to the Dodgers on April 9 and made his first start since the previous May, allowing four runs in four innings. On May 13, he picked up his first win since 2012.

On May 25, 2014, Beckett pitched a no-hitter against the Philadelphia Phillies at Citizens Bank Park, the 21st no-hitter in Dodgers history, and the first since Hideo Nomo did so in the 1996 season. He was also the first pitcher to no-hit the Phillies since Bob Forsch in 1978. Beckett threw 128 pitches, struck out six, and walked three en route to the victory. Beckett also became the oldest pitcher (34) to throw a no-hitter since Randy Johnson (40) threw a perfect game in 2004. He was honored as the National League Player of the Week as a result of that game.

On July 8, 2014, Beckett landed on the disabled list with a left hip impingement, an injury he said had gotten worse as the season went on. He returned to the rotation on July 22, but struggled when he returned. In a start on August 3, he was only able to pitch four innings against the Cubs. Afterward, Beckett told the team that he had experienced renewed discomfort in his injured hip. An MRI revealed that his hip impingement had resulted in a torn labrum and two cysts, possibly requiring season ending surgery. He was placed back on the 15-day disabled list on August 8. On September 3, 2014, Dodgers manager Don Mattingly told reporters that Beckett's season was likely over due to his injury. A couple of days later, Beckett confirmed that he would not pitch again in 2014 and added that he was also considering retirement. Beckett officially announced his retirement on October 7, 2014.

== Pitching style ==
Beckett threw five pitches regularly: a four-seam fastball (91–95 miles per hour (146–153 km/h)), a two-seam fastball (91–94 miles per hour (146–151 km/h)), a cutter (89–91 miles per hour (143–146 km/h)), a curveball (73–79 miles per hour (117–127 km/h)), and a changeup (86–88 miles per hour (138–142 km/h)). Beckett used all five of his pitches against left-handed hitters but dropped the changeup against righties. He preferred to use his curveball when ahead in the count, bolstered by its 34% whiff rate. Beckett also began to experiment with a slider and splitter in 2012.

== Personal life ==
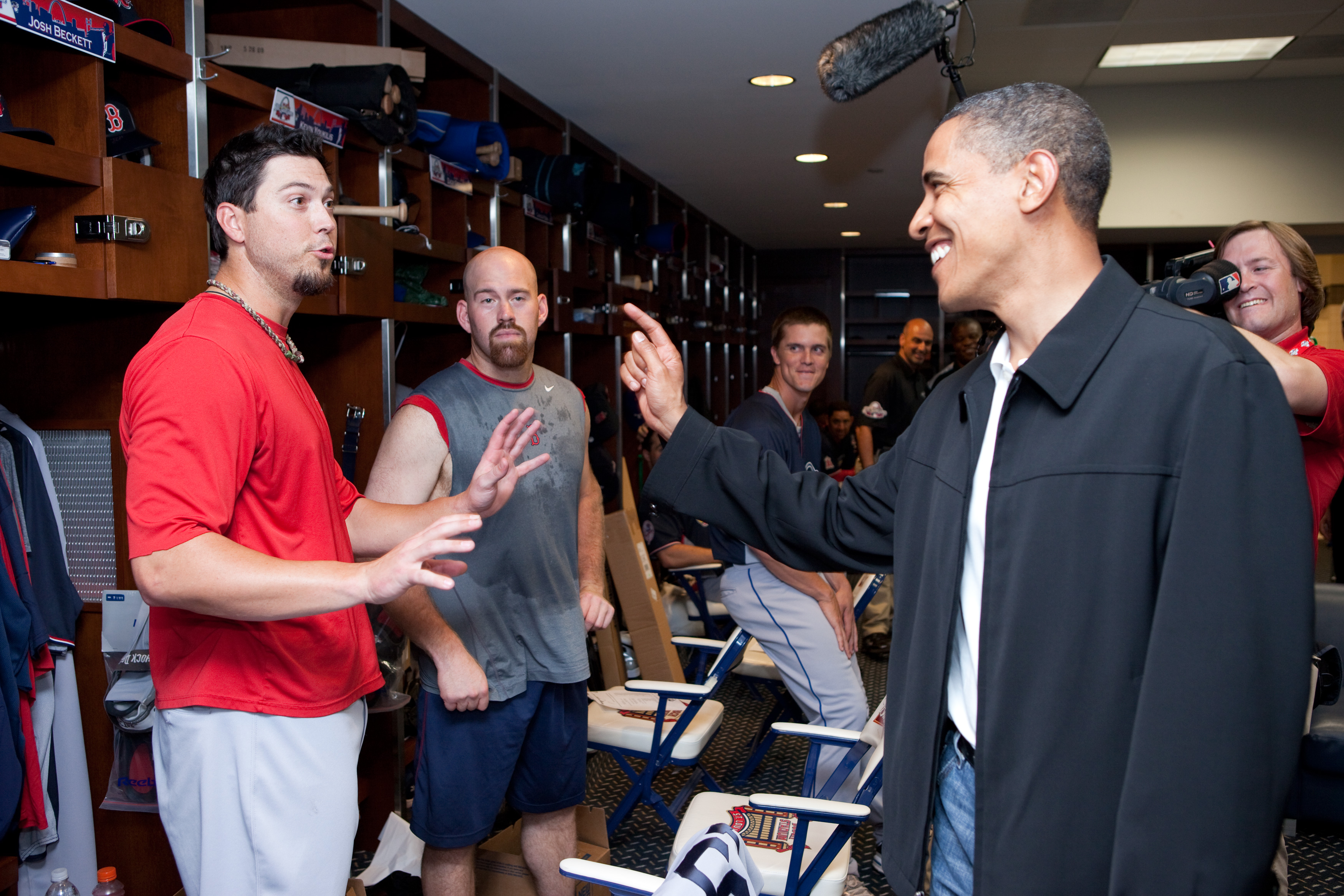
Beckett with President Barack Obama at Busch Stadium

Beckett has been linked to such celebrities as model/sportcaster Leeann Tweeden and country singer Danielle Peck. On October 18, 2007, Peck was invited by the Cleveland Indians to sing the National Anthem prior to Game 5 of the American League Championship Series between the Red Sox and Indians. Beckett was the starting pitcher in that game, and some Red Sox fans theorized that her invitation was an attempt by the Indians organization to distract Beckett. The Indians denied this claim. On January 22, 2011, he married Holly Fisher, an aeronautics engineer and former high school classmate. The couple have three children together. Beckett owns homes in Manhattan Beach, California, and Boerne, Texas.

Beckett is an avid deer hunter and has been since childhood. He was the 2002 winner of the Muy Grande Deer Contest for bringing down the largest buck during the Texas deer hunting season. He owns Herradura Ranch, a 7,000 acres (28 km^{2}) deer-hunting ranch outside of Cotulla, Texas.

He was featured in a Kevin Fowler music video alongside his teammates John Lackey, Tim Wakefield, Jon Lester and Clay Buchholz.

On November 11, 2017, Beckett was arrested for public intoxication as a result of charging at a country band at a local bar in Texas. The singer received a torn rotator cuff and dislocated shoulder.

== See also ==
- List of Major League Baseball career strikeout leaders
- List of Major League Baseball annual wins leaders

Preceded by Ryan Dempster	Florida Marlins Opening Day Starting Pitcher; 2003–2005	Succeeded by Dontrelle Willis
Preceded by Daisuke Matsuzaka	Boston Red Sox Opening Day Starting Pitcher; 2009–2010	Succeeded by Jon Lester
Preceded by Henderson Álvarez	No-hitter pitcher May 25, 2014	Succeeded by Clayton Kershaw
