= Harvey García =

Venezuelan baseball player (born 1984)

- Pitcher
- Born: March 16, 1984 (age 41); Caracas, Venezuela
- Batted: Right Threw: Right

MLB debut
- September 3, 2007, for the Florida Marlins

Last MLB appearance
- September 29, 2007, for the Florida Marlins

MLB statistics
- Win–loss record: 0–1
- Earned run average: 4.38
- Strikeouts: 15
- Stats at Baseball Reference

Teams
- Florida Marlins (2007)

Harvey Anderson García Ibarras (born March 16, 1984) is a Venezuelan former Major League Baseball pitcher.

== Professional career ==
=== Florida Marlins ===
Garcia was signed as an amateur free agent by the Florida Marlins in 2000 and after pitching for their Dominican League team he was released in 2002 and signed with the Boston Red Sox.

=== Boston Red Sox ===
Garcia signed with the Boston Red Sox on June 14, 2002. In November 2005, he was traded by the Red Sox to the Marlins along with Hanley Ramírez, Aníbal Sánchez and Jesús Delgado in exchange for Josh Beckett, Mike Lowell and Guillermo Mota.

=== Return to the Marlins ===
In November 2005, he was traded by the Red Sox to the Marlins along with Hanley Ramírez, Aníbal Sánchez and Jesús Delgado in exchange for Josh Beckett, Mike Lowell and Guillermo Mota. He was called up on September 2, 2007 and made his major league debut on September 3, 2007 against the Washington Nationals. He pitched in eight games with the Marlins in September, finishing 0–1 with a 4.38 ERA. He did not pitch in 2008 because of injury and during Spring Training in 2009 he was released by the Marlins.

=== Pittsburgh Pirates ===
On June 23, 2009 Garcia signed a minor league contract with the Pittsburgh Pirates. He appeared in 10 games with the Pirates Class-A team, the Lynchburg Hillcats and then was traded to the Los Angeles Dodgers to complete the trade that sent Delwyn Young to the Pirates for Eric Krebs and Garcia.

=== Los Angeles Dodgers ===
Garcia was traded to the Los Angeles Dodgers to complete the trade that sent Delwyn Young to the Pittsburgh Pirates for Eric Krebs and Garcia. He began 2010 with the Chattanooga Lookouts in the Double-A Southern League but was released by the Dodgers on May 22, 2010.

=== Washington Nationals ===
He signed with the Washington Nationals in December 2010, but he was released before the 2011 season.

=== France ===
In 2016, García began playing in the French Division 1 Baseball Championship. He spent the 2016 season in Toulouse with the Tigers de Toulouse. In 2017, he played in Saint-Just-Saint-Rambert for Saint-Just-Saint-Rambert Duffy Duck's. In 2019 and 2020, he played in Paris with the Paris Université Club.

== See also ==
- List of Major League Baseball players from Venezuela
