= Delwyn Young =

American baseball player (born 1982)

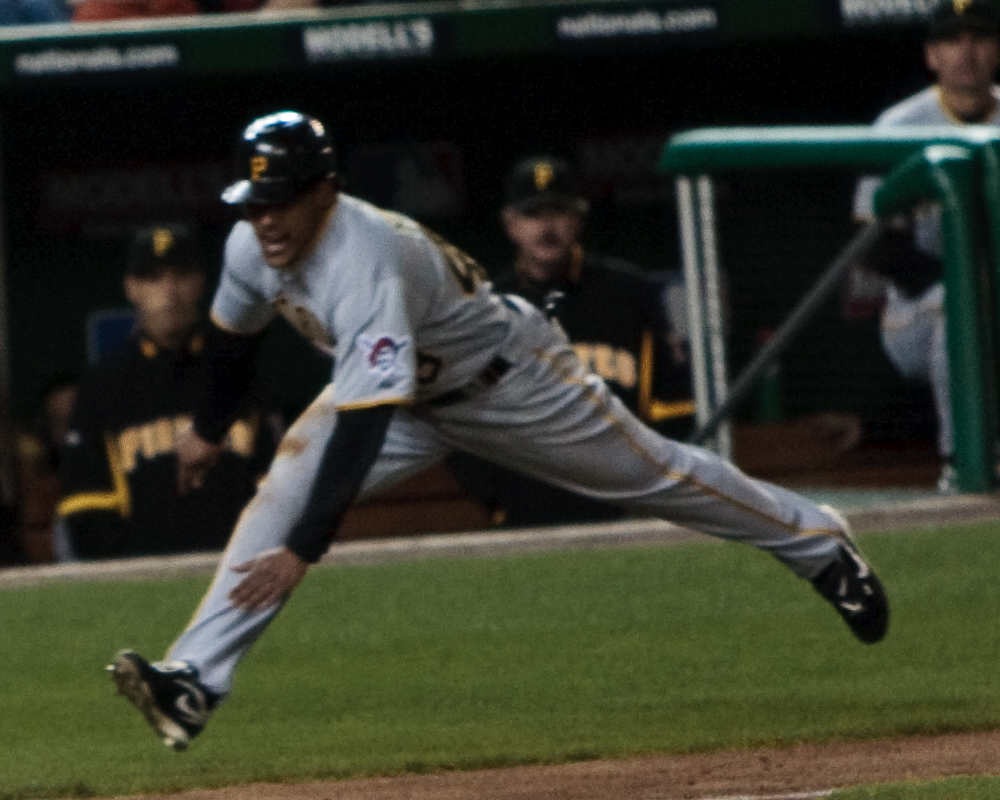
- Young with the Pittsburgh Pirates in 2009
- Outfielder / Second baseman
- Born: June 30, 1982 (age 43); Los Angeles, California, U.S.
- Batted: Switch Threw: Right

MLB debut
- September 7, 2006, for the Los Angeles Dodgers

Last MLB appearance
- October 2, 2010, for the Pittsburgh Pirates

MLB statistics
- Batting average: .258
- Home runs: 17
- Runs batted in: 81
- Stats at Baseball Reference

Teams
- Los Angeles Dodgers (2006–2008); Pittsburgh Pirates (2009–2010)
Medals
Men's baseball
Representing United States
Baseball World Cup
Gold medal – first place	2007 Tianmu	National team

Delwyn Rudy Young (born June 30, 1982) is an American former professional baseball utility player. He played in Major League Baseball (MLB) for the Los Angeles Dodgers and Pittsburgh Pirates. He was most recently the hitting coach for the Wilmington Blue Rocks.

== Early life ==
Young attended Littlerock High School in Littlerock, California where he was a four-year letter winner in baseball. He graduated in 2000.

== College career and draft ==
Young attended Santa Barbara City College under coach Teddy Warrecker where he still holds the team records for hits, runs, home runs and RBIs.

Young was drafted twice by the Atlanta Braves in 2000 (31st round) and 2001 (29th round), but did not sign as he preferred to remain in college.

== Professional career ==
=== Los Angeles Dodgers ===
Young was drafted by the Los Angeles Dodgers in the 4th round of the 2002 MLB draft and signed with them on June 12, 2002. After hitting well in the Dodger rookie leagues in 2002 (.300) & 2003 (.323), he played for the Vero Beach Dodgers in 2004, hitting .281 with 22 home runs, 85 RBI, and 11 stolen bases, earning Baseball America's second team Minor League All-Star honors as well as being a Florida State League All-Star at second base. In 2005, with the Double-A Jacksonville Suns, he hit .296 with 16 HRs and 62 RBIs, leading to his promotion to the Triple-A Las Vegas 51s. He hit .325 with the 51s in 36 games the remainder of the season. While he was with the 51s, the organization decided to change his position, moving him from second base to the outfield. He spent the entire 2006 season with the 51s, hitting .273 with 18 HRs and 98 RBI, though he had a high strikeout total with 104 strikeouts.

Young made his MLB debut with the Dodgers on September 7, 2006, against the New York Mets at Shea Stadium. He went hitless in one at bat. Young appeared in eight games for the Dodgers in September, going hitless in five at bats as a pinch hitter.

On August 3, 2007, Young made his first career start with the Dodgers. He recorded his first hit as a pinch hitter on August 4 against the Arizona Diamondbacks. On August 9, in his second career start, he went 4-for-4 against the Cincinnati Reds. He hit his first major league home run on September 25, off Colorado Rockies' pitcher Manny Corpas. A couple of days later he hit another one off the San Francisco Giants' Barry Zito.

On April 1, 2008, Young hit his first career walk-off single against San Francisco Giants pitcher Keiichi Yabu. He battled injuries the rest of the season, and had to undergo offseason surgery on his elbow His attempt to rejoin the Dodgers roster for 2009 was derailed when he suffered another minor injury in spring training, and he began the season on the disabled list.

=== Pittsburgh Pirates ===
Young was traded on April 14, 2009, to the Pittsburgh Pirates in exchange for two players to be named later. The Pirates sent Eric Krebs to the Dodgers on May 22, 2009, and they sent Harvey García to the Dodgers on August 1, 2009, to complete the trade.

Although mostly an outfielder, Young began working with Pirates coach Perry Hill on playing second base, a position he played in the minor leagues and occasionally with the Dodgers. He finished 2009 with 16 doubles, two triples, seven home runs, 43 runs batted in, two stolen bases, to go along with a .266 average, a .326 on-base percentage, a .381 slugging percentage, in 354 at-bats. He made the Pirates' Opening Day roster out of spring training as a bench player in 2010. On June 8, Young hit a two-run home run against Stephen Strasburg during Strasburg's first start as a big league pitcher. He was granted free agency on November 2.

=== Philadelphia Phillies ===
On January 6, 2011, the Philadelphia Phillies announced that Young had signed a minor league contract, with an invitation to spring training. He played the entire 2011 season with the Phillies top affiliate, the Lehigh Valley IronPigs. Young became a free agent again at the end of the season.

=== Camden Riversharks ===
Young signed a minor league contract with the Chicago White Sox on January 23, 2012. However, after not making the club out of spring training, he was released in March.

Young signed with the Camden Riversharks on July 26, 2012. In 35 games for Camden, he batted .192/.302/.267 with two home runs, five RBI, and one stolen base.

In 2013, Young returned to the Riversharks for a second season. In 123 appearances for the team, he hit .269/.342/.409 with 13 home runs, 67 RBI, and one stolen base.

=== Sugar Land Skeeters ===
Young signed a minor league contract with the Washington Nationals on January 14, 2013. He was released by Washington prior to the start of the regular season on March 23.

Young signed with the Sugar Land Skeeters of the Atlantic League of Professional Baseball for the 2014 season. In 135 appearances for the Skeetere, he batted .289/.341/.464 with 20 home runs, 88 RBI, and two stolen bases.

In 2015, Young returned to the Skeeters for a second season. In 118 games, he slashed .285/.355/.400 with 10 home runs, 45 RBI, and four stolen bases.

=== Tigres de Quintana Roo ===
On April 2, 2015, Young signed with the Tigres de Quintana Roo of the Mexican League. In six appearances for Quintana Roo, he went 3-for-16 (.188) with one home run and three RBI.

=== Sugar Land Skeeters (second stint) ===
In 2016, Young returned to the Sugar Land Skeeters of the Atlantic League of Professional Baseball. In 114 appearances for the team, he batted .297/.345/.393 with six home runs, 61 RBI, and two stolen bases. Young became a free agent after the season.

== Personal life ==
Young's father, Delwyn Young Sr., was drafted in 1981 by the Cincinnati Reds out of Belmont High School in Los Angeles. He played 11 seasons with five different organizations.

== Coaching career ==
=== New York Mets organization ===
Young served as the hitting coach for the Kingsport Mets in 2018 and the Brooklyn Cyclones in 2019, both minor league affiliates of the New York Mets.

=== Sugar Land Skeeters ===
On April 12, 2021, he was announced as the manager of the State College Spikes for the inaugural season of the MLB Draft League. He also served as an instructor for the Sugar Land Skeeters.

=== Washington Nationals organization ===
He was the hitting coach for the Washington Nationals' Single-A affiliate The Fredericksburg Nationals in 2022 and 2023. In 2024 Young was named as the hitting coach for the Washington Nationals High-A affiliate Wilmington Blue Rocks. His contract was not renewed after the 2025 season.
