= Oliver Drake (baseball) =

American baseball player (born 1987)

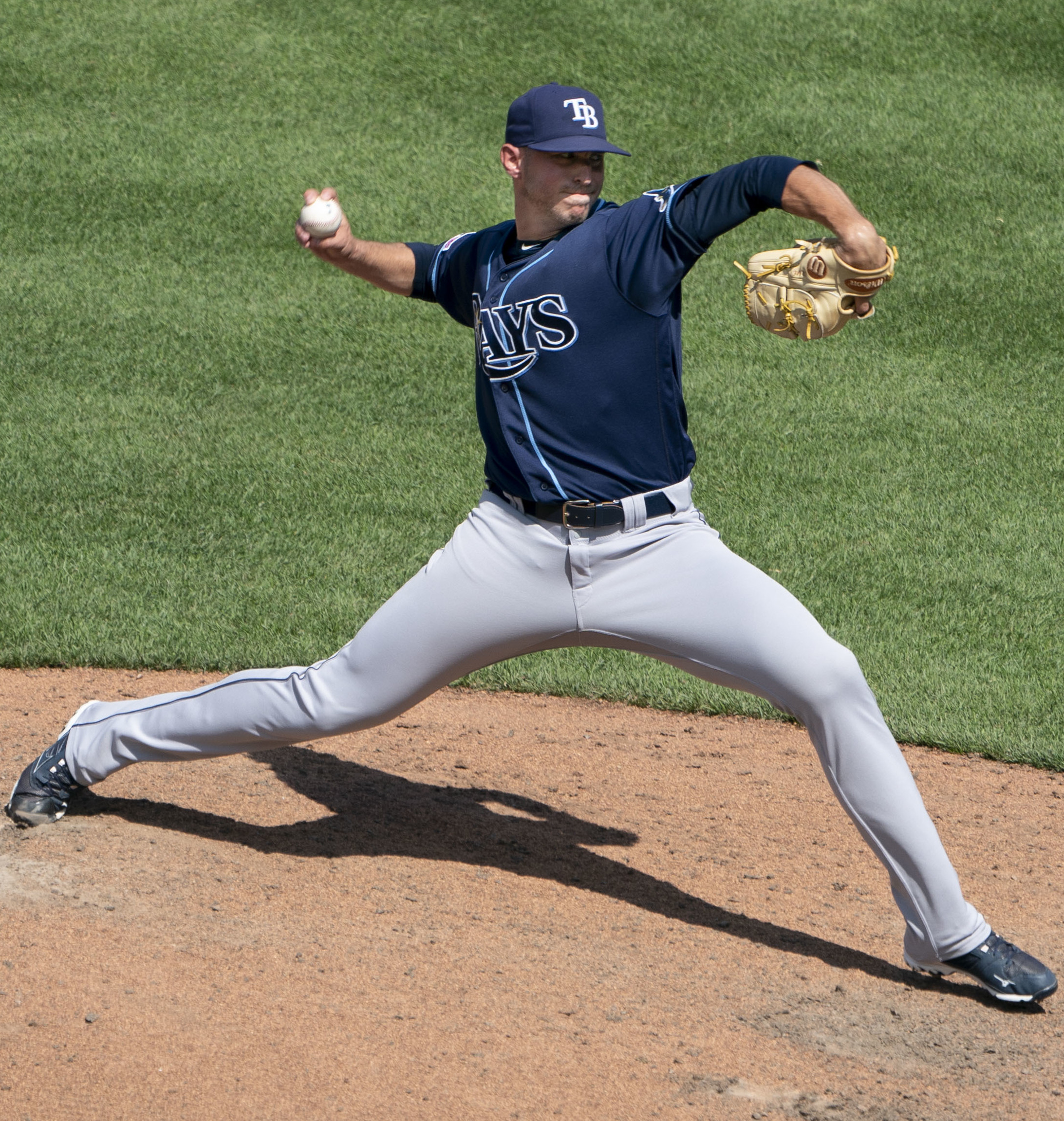
- Drake with the Tampa Bay Rays in 2019
- Pitcher
- Born: January 13, 1987 (age 39); Worcester, Massachusetts, U.S.
- Batted: Right Threw: Right

MLB debut
- May 23, 2015, for the Baltimore Orioles

Last MLB appearance
- September 27, 2020, for the Tampa Bay Rays

MLB statistics
- Win–loss record: 10–10
- Earned run average: 4.27
- Strikeouts: 228
- Stats at Baseball Reference

Teams
- Baltimore Orioles (2015–2017); Milwaukee Brewers (2017–2018); Cleveland Indians (2018); Los Angeles Angels (2018); Toronto Blue Jays (2018); Minnesota Twins (2018); Tampa Bay Rays (2019–2020)

Oliver Gardner Drake (born January 13, 1987) is an American former professional baseball pitcher. He has played in Major League Baseball (MLB) for the Baltimore Orioles, Milwaukee Brewers, Cleveland Indians, Los Angeles Angels, Toronto Blue Jays, Minnesota Twins and Tampa Bay Rays.

== Amateur career ==
Drake is a graduate of Northfield Mount Hermon School in Western Massachusetts, earning letters in baseball and hockey while a student there. He was a first-team All-CNEPSL as a junior and a senior, winning the Thompson Blanket, Ralph E. Jillson and Nettie M. Johnson Memorial awards as the latter.

After high school, Drake attended the United States Naval Academy and played for the Navy Midshipmen baseball team. He had one of the best freshman pitching seasons in school history, going 3–3 with a 3.22 earned run average (ERA). He went 6–3 with a 3.70 ERA as a sophomore, having an 8.74 strikeout-to-walk ratio.

After two years at Navy, Drake was drafted in the 43rd round (1,286th overall) of the 2008 MLB draft by the Baltimore Orioles.

== Professional career ==
=== Baltimore Orioles ===
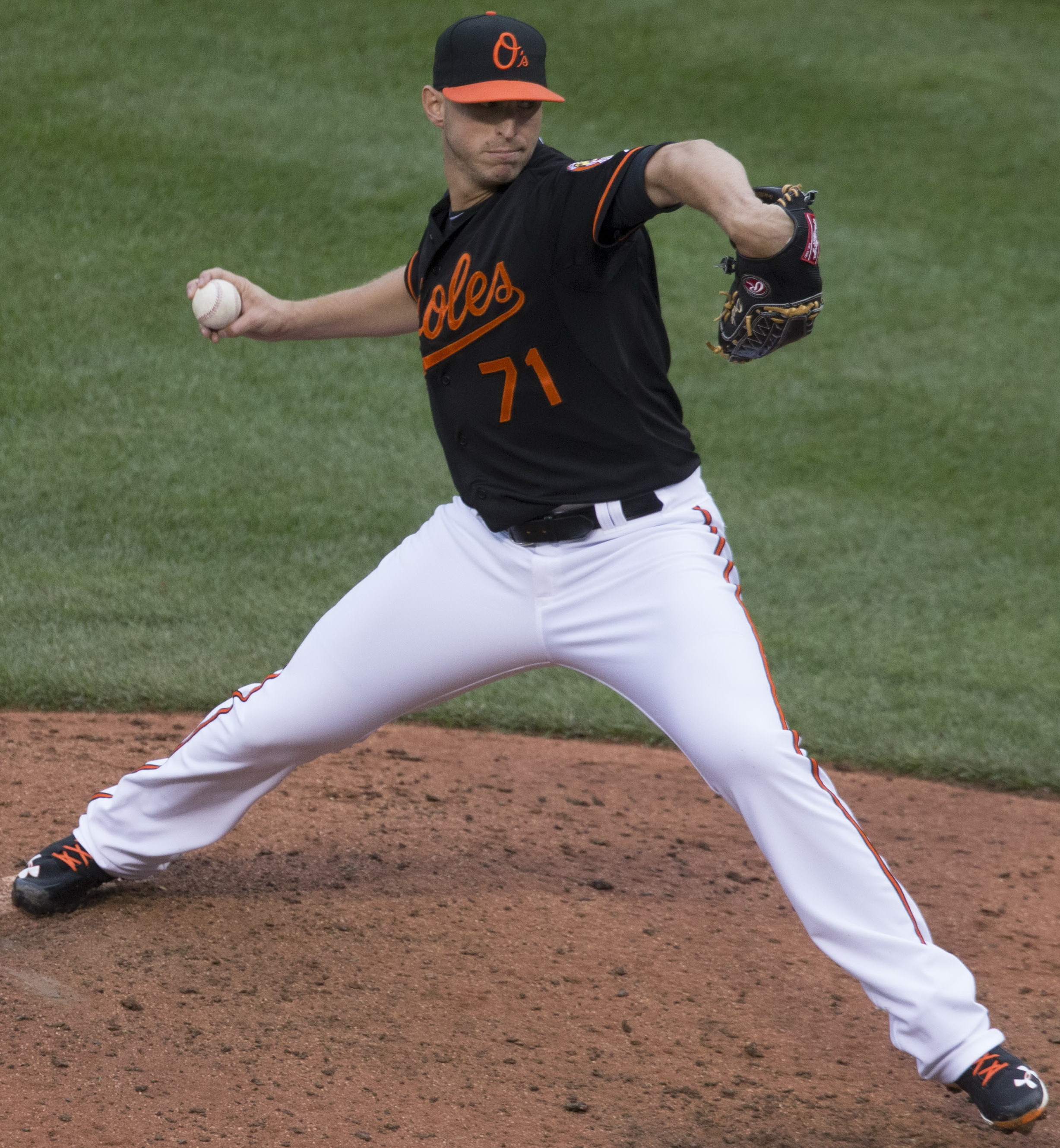
Drake with the Baltimore Orioles in 2015

Drake was assigned to Rookie-league Bluefield, then the Bluefield Orioles, pitching in 7 games, going 1–0 with a 0.77 ERA before being promoted to Low-A Aberdeen, pitching in 5 games with a 0.87 ERA. His totals in 2008 were 12 games, going 1–0 with a 0.82 ERA. He spent all of 2009 with Single-A Delmarva, going 8–9 with a 4.34 ERA over 25 games, 24 of them starts. He played all of the 2010 season with High-A Frederick, going 6–6 with a 4.36 ERA over 24 games. He also played in the Arizona Fall League with Scottsdale, going 1–3 with an 8.38 ERA. He split 2011 with Frederick and Double-A Bowie, while also playing 1 game with Triple-A Norfolk, going a combined 11–8 with a 3.32 ERA over 27 games. He was added to the Orioles' 40-man roster following the season. He had shoulder surgery in 2012. Entering 2014, he was rated the Orioles' 24th-best prospect by Baseball America.

Drake signed a major league deal with the Baltimore Orioles on November 18, 2014. In 2015, in 18 2/3 innings for Norfolk, he had a 0.96 ERA.

On May 23, 2015, Drake was promoted to the Major League team and made his pitching debut that day. Entering the game in the ninth inning of a scoreless tie against the Miami Marlins, Drake pitched three scoreless innings, allowing only two hits and striking out two in a game the Orioles eventually lost 1–0 in 13 innings. By making his big-league debut, Drake became the second former Naval Academy pitcher to make his Major League debut during the 2015 season, along with Navy alum Mitch Harris of the St. Louis Cardinals.

Drake pitched in five games and 7.2 innings for the Orioles with a 3.52 ERA. On June 3 he was optioned back to the AAA Norfolk Tides. Drake pitched in 13 games for the Orioles in 2015, pitching to a 2.87 ERA in 15 2/3 innings. He struck out 17 batters.

On September 23, 2016, Drake pitched one inning of relief in extra innings out of the bullpen for the Orioles who would walk it off in the bottom half of the inning, giving Drake his first career victory.

=== Milwaukee Brewers ===
On April 13, 2017, Drake was designated for assignment. Later the same day, the Orioles traded him to the Milwaukee Brewers for a player to be named later or cash considerations.

On March 28, 2018, Drake made the Opening Day roster for the Milwaukee Brewers. Drake posted a 5.11 ERA, 1.7 WHIP and a 7:7 K:BB across 12.1 innings in Spring Training leading up to the 2018 season. After struggling to begin the season, he was designated for assignment on May 1.

=== Cleveland Indians ===
On May 5, 2018, Drake was traded to the Cleveland Indians in exchange for cash considerations. He was later designated for assignment on May 26.

=== Los Angeles Angels ===
On May 31, 2018, Drake was claimed off waivers by the Los Angeles Angels. Drake was designated for assignment on June 16, 2018, and again on July 23.

=== Toronto Blue Jays ===
On July 26, 2018, Drake was claimed by the Toronto Blue Jays. He was designated for assignment on July 30.

=== Minnesota Twins ===
On August 3, 2018, Drake was claimed off waivers by the Minnesota Twins. When Drake entered the game on August 4 against the Kansas City Royals, he tied the major league record for most teams played for in a single season with five, a record first set by Bobo Leonard in 1924. The mark has since been matched by two players: Mike Baumann (2024) and José Ureña (2025).

=== Tampa Bay Rays ===
On November 1, 2018, Drake was claimed off waivers by the Tampa Bay Rays. He was designated for assignment on November 20. On November 26, Drake was claimed off waivers by the Toronto Blue Jays.

On January 4, 2019, Drake was traded back to the Rays in exchange for cash considerations. On January 18, the Rays designated Drake for assignment at which he was outrighted to the Durham Bulls on January 24. He was called up by Tampa Bay on May 26 as Tyler Glasnow was added to the 60-day injured list. On August 12, Drake recorded his first career hit, an RBI single at Petco Park against the San Diego Padres.

Drake saw insignificant playing time in 2020 due to injuries. The Rays designated him for assignment on October 11, 2020. On October 14, Drake was outrighted, but rejected the outright assignment and elected free agency. On February 17, 2021, Drake re-signed with the Rays on a $775K major league contract. On February 22, Drake was placed on the 60-day injured list due to a flexor strain in his elbow. On November 5, Drake was outrighted off of the 40-man roster and elected free agency.
