= Mike Baumann =

American baseball player (born 1995)

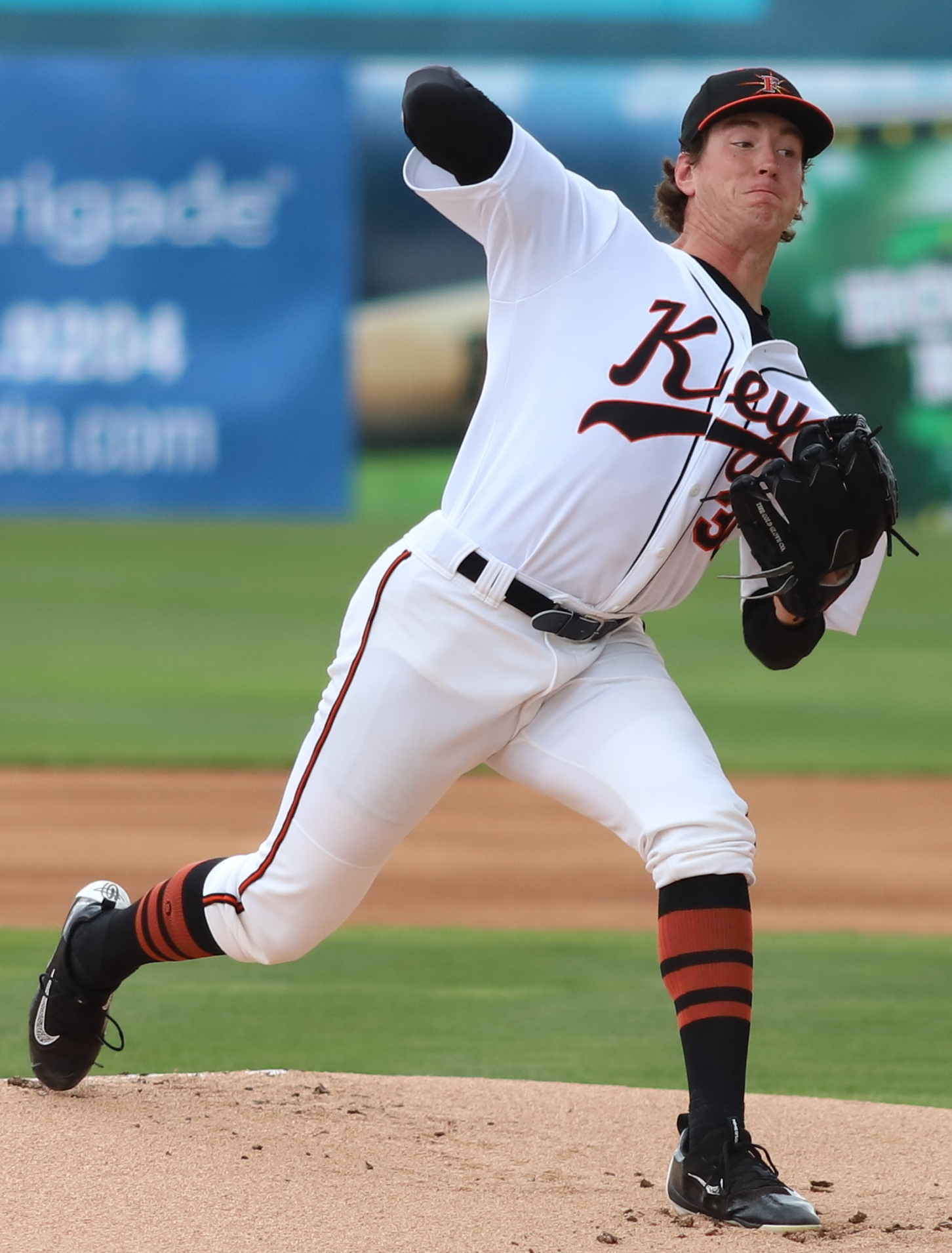
- Baumann with the Frederick Keys in 2018

Free agent
- Pitcher
- Born: September 10, 1995 (age 31); Mahtomedi, Minnesota, U.S.
- Bats: Right Throws: Right

Professional debut
- MLB: September 7, 2021, for the Baltimore Orioles
- NPB: April 17, 2025, for the Tokyo Yakult Swallows

MLB statistics (through 2024 season)
- Win–loss record: 15–6
- Earned run average: 4.95
- Strikeouts: 147

NPB statistics (through 2025 season)
- Win–loss record: 0–2
- Earned run average: 4.20
- Strikeouts: 19
- Stats at Baseball Reference

Teams
- Baltimore Orioles (2021–2024); Seattle Mariners (2024); San Francisco Giants (2024); Los Angeles Angels (2024); Miami Marlins (2024); Tokyo Yakult Swallows (2025)

Michael Thomas Baumann (born September 10, 1995) is an American professional baseball pitcher who is a free agent. He has previously played in Major League Baseball (MLB) for the Baltimore Orioles, Seattle Mariners, San Francisco Giants, Los Angeles Angels, and Miami Marlins, and in Nippon Professional Baseball (NPB) for the Tokyo Yakult Swallows.

In 2024, Baumann made history by playing for five different franchises—the Orioles, Mariners, Giants, Angels, and Marlins. This tied the single-season record for most franchises played for, a feat previously achieved by Oliver Drake in 2018 and Bobo Leonard in 1924.

== Amateur career ==
Baumann attended Mahtomedi High School in Mahtomedi, Minnesota, and played for the school's baseball and American football teams. The Minnesota Twins selected him in the 34th round of the 2014 MLB draft. He did not sign, instead enrolling at Jacksonville University to play college baseball for the Jacksonville Dolphins. In 2016, he played collegiate summer baseball with the Yarmouth–Dennis Red Sox of the Cape Cod Baseball League.

== Professional career ==
=== Baltimore Orioles ===
The Baltimore Orioles selected Baumann in the third round of the 2017 MLB draft. In 2018, Baumann began the season with the Delmarva Shorebirds of the Single-A South Atlantic League. He received a promotion in May to the Frederick Keys of the High-A Carolina League. He combined to go 7–6 with a 2.98 ERA and 142 strikeouts over 124 innings in 2019. On November 20, 2020, the Orioles added Baumann to their 40-man roster to protect him from the Rule 5 draft.

On September 7, 2021, Baumann made his major league debut with the Orioles against the Kansas City Royals at Oriole Park at Camden Yards. In his debut he pitched 3 2/3 innings and allowed two hits and one walk. Baumann struck out one batter and retired 11 of the 14 batters he faced. He also earned his first Major League win. In his rookie campaign, Baumann recorded a 9.90 ERA in four games.

Baumann pitched in 14 contests for Baltimore in 2022, registering a 4.72 ERA with 23 strikeouts across 34 1/3 innings of work. On March 16, 2023, it was announced that Baumann would shift to a short-relief role rather than being a starter. He made 60 appearances out of the bullpen for the Orioles, compiling a 10–1 record and 3.76 RRA with 61 strikeouts across 64 2/3 innings pitched.

In 2024, Baumann made 17 relief appearances for Baltimore, logging a 3.44 ERA with 16 strikeouts across 18 1/3 innings pitched. On May 18, 2024, Baumann was designated for assignment by the Orioles.

=== Seattle Mariners ===
On May 22, 2024, Baumann and Michael Pérez were traded to the Seattle Mariners in exchange for Blake Hunt. In 18 appearances for Seattle, he logged a 5.51 ERA with 16 strikeouts across 16 1/3 innings pitched. Baumann was designated for assignment by the Mariners on July 19.

=== San Francisco Giants ===
On, July 21, 2024, Baumann was claimed off waivers by the San Francisco Giants. He made one appearance for the Giants, allowing two runs and recording two outs in a blowout victory against the Colorado Rockies on July 26. The following day, Baumann was designated for assignment.

=== Los Angeles Angels ===
On July 30, 2024, Baumann was traded to the Los Angeles Angels in exchange for cash considerations. In 10 games for the Angels, he worked to a 6.75 ERA with 7 strikeouts across 9 1/3 innings. Baumann was designated for assignment following the promotion of Ryan Zeferjahn on August 23.

=== Miami Marlins ===
On August 25, 2024, Baumann was claimed off waivers by the Miami Marlins. He tied Oliver Drake and Bobo Leonard's record for appearing with five different teams in a single season. Baumann was responsible for giving up the historic 50th home run of the season to Shohei Ohtani as part of the first ever 50-50 season in major league history. In 11 appearances for Miami, he struggled to a 6.59 ERA with 18 strikeouts across 13 2/3 innings pitched. Baumann was released by the Marlins organization on December 9, in order to pursue an opportunity in Japan.

=== Tokyo Yakult Swallows ===
On December 9, 2024, Baumann signed with the Tokyo Yakult Swallows of Nippon Professional Baseball. He made 16 appearances for the Swallows in 2025, posting an 0-2 record and 4.20 ERA with 19 strikeouts over 15 innings of work. On October 14, 2025, the Swallows announced that they would not retain Baumann for the 2026 season.

=== New York Mets ===
On January 1, 2026, Baumann signed a minor league contract with the New York Mets. He made 10 appearances for the Triple–A Syracuse Mets, compiling a 1–1 record and 5.73 ERA with nine strikeouts and one save across 11 innings of relief. Baumann was released by the Mets organization on June 29.

== Personal life ==
His older brother, Nick, also played baseball and football at Mahtomedi and starred on the defensive line for the Concordia Cobbers.

Baumann married his fiancée, Nicole, in December 2023. The wedding took place in Florida, where he resides in the offseason.

Their first child, a son, was born in September 2024.
