= 2011 Pittsburgh Pirates season =

2011 Pittsburgh Pirates
- League: National League
- Division: Central
- Ballpark: PNC Park
- City: Pittsburgh, Pennsylvania
- Record: 72–90 (.444)
- Divisional place: 4th
- Owners: Bob Nutting
- General managers: Neal Huntington
- Managers: Clint Hurdle
- Television: Root Sports Pittsburgh
- Radio: WPGB-FM (Steve Blass, Greg Brown, Tim Neverett, Bob Walk, John Wehner)

The 2011 Pittsburgh Pirates season was the franchise's 125th season as a member of the National League and 130th season overall. This was their 11th season at PNC Park. The season was the first with manager Clint Hurdle, who was hired to replace the fired John Russell. After going a major league worst 57–105, they enjoyed somewhat of a resurgence, winning more than 70 games for the first time since 2004 and being covered significantly in the summer due to being involved in the pennant race, but they still locked up their 19th consecutive losing season.

== Regular season ==
=== April ===
The Pirates won their opening game against the Cubs in Chicago 6–3. Neil Walker led the offense with a grand slam in the fifth inning, becoming the only Pirate other than Roberto Clemente to hit a grand slam on opening day. Pittsburgh blew a lead the following day and lost, but scored two runs in the final inning of the series finale to finish their first series with a 2–1 record. Pittsburgh defeated the St. Louis Cardinals in two of three games during their second series, marking the first time the Pirates had won the majority of games in two consecutive road series since 2007. Pittsburgh came home to face the Colorado Rockies; winning one game out of four. In the second game of the series, the Pirates prevailed in a 5-hour, 10-minute game which lasted 14 innings. After an injury to starting pitcher Ross Ohlendorf, the bullpen combined for 11 1/3 scoreless innings—the most for the Pirates since 1900.

==== Taser incident ====
During the April 9 game in Pittsburgh, a local man was arrested in the left-field seating section. According to the Pittsburgh Tribune-Review, the man "appeared to be drunk, bothered fans in his section and belligerently refused to cooperate" when he would not leave at the game at the request of PNC Park employees and police. While being escorted from the section the man struck a ballpark employee, which was met with officers putting him under arrest after "Tasering him to little effect before clubbing him in the neck, head, side and legs." The entire incident was captured on video. He was charged with public drunkenness, resisting arrest, and two additional misdemeanors. In a related incident, a woman was arrested and charged with aggravated assault, disorderly conduct, and defiant trespassing. After yelling at the officers making the initial arrest, she then "resisted an officer's attempts to remove her from the park" while yelling obscenities.

=== May ===
In May, the Pirates compiled a 13–13 (.500) record, and finished the month at 25–28 for the season.

=== June ===
On June 24, 2011, the Pirates defeated the Boston Red Sox, 3–1, to improve their record to 38–37. This is the latest in the season that the Pirates have been above .500 since 1999.

On June 28, 2011, the Pirates defeated the Blue Jays 7–6 at the Rogers Centre, to mark their first inter-league road victory in two years.

=== July ===
On July 8, the Pirates defeated the Chicago Cubs to enter the All-Star break above the .500 mark for the first time since 1992. The Pirates also sent three players to the All-Star Game with the selections of Kevin Correia, Joel Hanrahan and Andrew McCutchen. This marked the first time since 1990 that the team had three All-Stars in the National League lineup. While Correia did not enter the game, along with Tim Lincecum, McCutchen entered the game in the seventh inning, batting in the eighth. Hanrahan was called to close in the top of the ninth, striking out the first batter, however an untimely error from Cubs shortstop Starlin Castro and a single led to two men in scoring position. Brian Wilson got the save.

On July 15, and again on July 18, the Pirates moved into first place of the NL Central. This marked the first two times that the Pirates were in first place this late in the season since 1997.

July 25 saw the Pirates return to the national stage with their game at Atlanta being televised on ESPN. This is the first time the Pirates had been on ESPN since September 22, 2004. The Pirates went on to win the game 3 to 1, moving them again into a first place tie in the NL Central.

The next night, the Pirates fell victim to a controversial call in a 4–3 loss to the Braves after 19 innings. Braves infielder Julio Lugo was ruled safe at home plate by home plate umpire Jerry Meals even though replay clearly showed Lugo should have been called out. Meals and the league both admitted the call was incorrect. The team ended up filing a complaint with the commissioner's office.

== Game log ==
2011 Game Log (72–90)
April (12–15)

#	Date	Opponent	Score	Win	Loss	Save	Attendance	Record
1	April 1	@ Cubs	6–3	**Correia (1–0)**	Dempster (0–1)	**Hanrahan (1)**	41,358	1–0
2	April 2	@ Cubs	3–5	Marshall (1–0)	**Meek (0–1)**	Marmol (1)	35,782	1–1
3	April 3	@ Cubs	5–4	**Karstens (1–0)**	Marmol (0–1)	**Hanrahan (2)**	30,857	2–1
4	April 4	@ Cardinals	4–3	**Morton (1–0)**	Lohse (0–1)	**Hanrahan (3)**	32,007	3–1
5	April 5	@ Cardinals	2–3	Batista (1–0)	**Olson (0–1)**	Franklin (1)	33,666	3–2
6	April 6	@ Cardinals	3–1	**Correia (2–0)**	Carpenter (0–1)	**Hanrahan (4)**	34,965	4–2
7	April 7	Rockies	1–7	Rogers (1–0)	**Maholm (0–1)**	—	39,219	4–3
8	April 8	Rockies	4–3 (14)	**Olson (1–1)**	Morales (0–1)	—	29,192	5–3
9	April 9	Rockies	4–6	Belisle (1–0)	**Veras (0–1)**	Lindstrom (1)	25,398	5–4
10	April 10	Rockies	5–6	Chacin (2–0)	**Crotta (0–1)**	Street (4)	18,043	5–5
—	April 12	Brewers	**Postponed**					
11	April 13	Brewers	0–6	Marcum (2–1)	**Correia (2–1)**	—	8,755	5–6
12	April 14	Brewers	1–4	Wolf (1–2)	**Maholm (0–2)**	—	10,517	5–7
13	April 15	@ Reds	6–1	**Morton (2–0)**	Arroyo (2–1)	—	21,312	6–7
14	April 16	@ Reds	2–11	Leake (2–0)	**McDonald (0–1)**	—	26,418	6–8
15	April 17	@ Reds	7–6	**Resop (1–0)**	Ondrusek (2–1)	**Hanrahan (5)**	32,105	7–8
16	April 18	@ Reds	9–3	**Correia (3–1)**	Wood (1–2)	—	12,777	8–8
17	April 19	@ Marlins	0–6	Johnson (3–0)	**Maholm (0–3)**	—	11,118	8–9
18	April 20	@ Marlins	0–6	Nolasco (2–0)	**Morton (2–1)**	—	10,112	8–10
19	April 21	@ Marlins	5–9	Volstad (1–1)	**McDonald (0–2)**	—	12,308	8–11
—	April 22	Nationals	**Postponed**					
20	April 23	Nationals	7–2	**Karstens (2–0)**	Hernandez (2–2)	—	18,262	9–11
21	April 24	Nationals	3–6	Marquis (2–0)	**Correia (3–2)**	Storen (3)	9,520	9–12
22	April 25	Nationals	4–2	**Maholm (1–3)**	Lannan (2–2)	**Hanrahan (6)**	12,457	10–12
23	April 26	Giants	2–3 (10)	Romo (1–0)	**Hanrahan (0–1)**	Wilson (6)	9,832	10–13
24	April 27	Giants	2–0	**McDonald (1–2)**	Bumgarner (0–4)	**Hanrahan (7)**	9,048	11–13
25	April 28	Giants	2–5	Vogelsong (1–0)	**Karstens (2–1)**	Wilson (7)	14,747	11–14
26	April 29	@ Rockies	3–0	**Correia (4–2)**	Chacin (3–2)	**Hanrahan (8)**	34,477	12–14
27	April 30	@ Rockies	1–4	Hammel (3–1)	**Maholm (1–4)**	Street (10)	33,684	12–15

May (13–13)

#	Date	Opponent	Score	Win	Loss	Save	Attendance	Record
28	May 1	@ Rockies	8–4	**Morton (3–1)**	Jimenez (0–2)	—	35,012	13–15
29	May 2	@ Padres	4–3	**McDonald (2–2)**	Harang (4–2)	**Hanrahan (9)**	20,546	14–15
30	May 3	@ Padres	5–6	Adams (1–0)	**Beimel (0–1)**	Bell (7)	18,636	14–16
31	May 4	@ Padres	7–4	**Correia (5–2)**	Richard (1–3)	—	16,613	15–16
32	May 6	Astros	2–3	Rodriguez (2–3)	**Resop (1–1)**	Melancon (1)	12,728	15–17
33	May 7	Astros	6–1	**Morton (4–1)**	Norris (2–2)	—	32,299	16–17
34	May 8	Astros	5–4	**McCutchen (1–0)**	Abad (1–3)	**Hanrahan (10)**	17,946	17–17
35	May 9	Dodgers	4–1	**Veras (1–1)**	Billingsley (2–2)	**Hanrahan (11)**	11,373	18–17
36	May 10	Dodgers	3–10	Lilly (3–3)	**Correia (5–3)**	—	13,497	18–18
37	May 11	Dodgers	0–2	Kuroda (4–3)	**Maholm (1–5)**	Padilla (3)	12,910	18–19
—	May 12	Dodgers	**Postponed**					
38	May 13	@ Brewers	2–5	Gallardo (4–2)	**McDonald (2–3)**	Axford (8)	32,837	18–20
39	May 14	@ Brewers	2–8	Narveson (2–3)	**Karstens (2–2)**	—	42,422	18–21
40	May 15	@ Brewers	6–9	Greinke (2–1)	**Correia (5–4)**	—	37,059	18–22
41	May 16	@ Nationals	2–4	Kimball (1–0)	**Maholm (1–6)**	Storen (9)	21,960	18–23
—	May 17	@ Nationals	**Postponed**					
42	May 18	@ Reds	5–0	**Morton (5–1)**	Arroyo (3–4)	—	16,543	19–23
43	May 19	@ Reds	5–3	**McDonald (3–3)**	Cueto (2–1)	**Hanrahan (12)**	26,018	20–23
44	May 20	Tigers	10–1	**Karstens (3–2)**	Penny (4–4)	—	24,396	21–23
45	May 21	Tigers	6–2	**Correia (6–4)**	Scherzer (6–1)	**Hanrahan (13)**	37,958	22–23
46	May 22	Tigers	0–2	Porcello (4–2)	**Maholm (1–7)**	Valverde (11)	25,124	22–24
47	May 24	Braves	0–2	Jurrjens (6–1)	**Morton (5–2)**	Kimbrel (13)	16,873	22–25
48	May 25	Braves	2–4 (11)	Sherrill (1–0)	**Karstens (3–3)**	Kimbrel (14)	21,497	22–26
49	May 27	@ Cubs	4–2	**Correia (7–4)**	Davis (0–3)	**Hanrahan (14)**	34,105	23–26
50	May 28	@ Cubs	10–0	**Maholm (2–7)**	Wells (1–1)	—	38,413	24–26
51	May 29	@ Cubs	2–3	Dempster (4–4)	**Karstens (3–4)**	Marmol (10)	37,464	24–27
52	May 30	@ Mets	3–7	Gee (5–0)	**McCutchen (1–1)**	—	24,490	24–28
53	May 31	@ Mets	5–1	**Meek (1–1)**	Dickey (2–6)	—	26,198	25–28

June (16–11)

#	Date	Opponent	Score	Win	Loss	Save	Attendance	Record
54	June 1	@ Mets	9–3	**Correia (8–4)**	Capuano (3–6)	—	25,234	26–28
55	June 2	@ Mets	8–9	Isringhausen (1–0)	**Veras (1–2)**	Rodriguez (16)	30,074	26–29
56	June 3	Phillies	2–1 (12)	**Moskos (1–0)**	Baez (1–3)	—	33,861	27–29
57	June 4	Phillies	6–3	**Morton (6–2)**	Kendrick (3–4)	—	39,441	28–29
58	June 5	Phillies	3–7	Halladay (8–3)	**McDonald (3–4)**	—	35,505	28–30
59	June 7	D-backs	8–5	**Resop (2–1)**	Hernandez (2–2)	**Hanrahan (15)**	12,378	29–30
60	June 8	D-backs	3–2 (12)	**McCutchen (2–1)**	Kroenke (0–1)	—	14,015	30–30
61	June 9	D-backs	0–2	Owings (2–0)	**Resop (2–2)**	Hernandez (2)	12,468	30–31
62	June 10	Mets	1–8	Gee (7–0)	**Morton (6–3)**	—	24,653	30–32
63	June 11	Mets	3–2	**McDonald (4–4)**	Dickey (3–7)	**Hanrahan (16)**	39,273	31–32
64	June 12	Mets	0–7	Capuano (5–6)	**Correia (8–5)**	—	26,452	31–33
65	June 13	Mets	3–1	**Maholm (3–7)**	Pelfrey (3–5)	**Hanrahan (17)**	15,555	32–33
66	June 14	@ Astros	1–0	**Karstens (4–4)**	Norris (4–5)	**Hanrahan (18)**	29,712	33–33
67	June 15	@ Astros	7–3	**Morton (7–3)**	Del Rosario (0–1)	**Hanrahan (19)**	29,866	34–33
68	June 16	@ Astros	5–4	**McDonald (5–4)**	Lyles (0–2)	**Veras (1)**	26,415	35–33
69	June 17	@ Indians	1–5	Tomlin (8–4)	**Correia (8–6)**	—	38,549	35–34
70	June 18	@ Indians	1–5	Carrasco (7–3)	**Maholm (3–8)**	—	31,865	35–35
71	June 19	@ Indians	2–5 (11)	Sipp (3–0)	**Wood (0–1)**	—	30,023	35–36
72	June 20	Orioles	3–8	Arrieta (9–4)	**Morton (7–4)**	—	22,447	35–37
73	June 21	Orioles	9–3	**Resop (3–2)**	Guthrie (2–9)	—	33,806	36–37
74	June 22	Orioles	5–4	**Correia (9–6)**	Britton (6–5)	**Hanrahan (20)**	19,418	37–37
75	June 24	Red Sox	3–1	**Maholm (4–8)**	Lester (9–4)	**Hanrahan (21)**	39,330	38–37
76	June 25	Red Sox	6–4	**Karstens (5–4)**	Wakefield (4–3)	**Hanrahan (22)**	39,483	39–37
77	June 26	Red Sox	2–4	Miller (1–0)	**Wood (0–2)**	Papelbon (14)	39,511	39–38
78	June 28	@ Blue Jays	7–6	**Correia (10–6)**	Reyes (3–7)	**Hanrahan (23)**	17,085	40–38
79	June 29	@ Blue Jays	1–2	Morrow (4–4)	**Maholm (4–9)**	Francisco (9)	15,632	40–39
80	June 30	@ Blue Jays	6–2	**Karstens (6–4)**	Cecil (1–3)	—	14,939	41–39

July (13–13)

#	Date	Opponent	Score	Win	Loss	Save	Attendance	Record
81	July 1	@ Nationals	1–2	Storen (5–2)	**Wood (0–3)**	—	22,399	41–40
82	July 2	@ Nationals	5–3	**Veras (2–2)**	Burnett (3–5)	**Hanrahan (24)**	—	42–40
83	July 2	@ Nationals	3–4	Mattheus (1–0)	**Watson (0–1)**	Storen (20)	39,638	42–41
84	July 3	@ Nationals	10–2	**Correia (11–6)**	Marquis (7–3)	—	23,522	43–41
85	July 4	Astros	5–3	**Maholm (5–9)**	Myers (3–8)	**Hanrahan (25)**	36,942	44–41
86	July 5	Astros	5–1	**Karstens (7–4)**	Rodriguez (6–5)	—	18,151	45–41
87	July 6	Astros	2–8	Norris (5–6)	**Morton (7–5)**	—	18,910	45–42
88	July 8	Cubs	7–4	**McCutchen (3–1)**	Marshall (5–3)	**Hanrahan (26)**	37,140	46–42
89	July 9	Cubs	3–6	Dempster (6–6)	**Correia (11–7)**	Marmol (19)	39,235	46–43
90	July 10	Cubs	9–1	**Maholm (6–9)**	Ortiz (0–2)	—	31,428	47–43
91	July 15	@ Astros	4–0	**Karstens (8–4)**	Myers (3–10)	—	27,787	48–43
92	July 16	@ Astros	4–6	Escalona (2–1)	**Veras (2–3)**	Melancon (7)	35,081	48–44
93	July 17	@ Astros	7–5 (11)	**Leroux (1–0)**	Melancon (5–3)	**Resop (1)**	24,580	49–44
94	July 18	Reds	2–0	**Morton (8–5)**	Willis (0–1)	**Hanrahan (27)**	22,016	50–44
95	July 19	Reds	1–0	**McDonald (6–4)**	Leake (8–5)	**Hanrahan (28)**	26,058	51–44
96	July 20	Reds	1–3	Cueto (6–3)	**Karstens (8–5)**	Cordero (19)	25,207	51–45
97	July 22	Cardinals	4–6	Carpenter (6–7)	**Maholm (6–10)**	Salas (18)	38,490	51–46
98	July 23	Cardinals	1–9	Garcia (10–4)	**Correia (11–8)**	—	39,102	51–47
99	July 24	Cardinals	4–3 (10)	**Beimel (1–1)**	Motte (3–2)	—	35,402	52–47
100	July 25	@ Braves	3–1	**McDonald (7–4)**	Hudson (9–7)	**Hanrahan (29)**	30,098	53–47
101	July 26	@ Braves	3–4 (19)	Proctor (2–3)	**McCutchen (3–2)**	—	22,036	53–48
102	July 27	@ Braves	1–2 (10)	Linebrink (4–2)	**Leroux (1–1)**	—	24,186	53–49
103	July 28	@ Braves	5–2	**Correia (12–8)**	Lowe (6–9)	**Hanrahan (30)**	38,355	54–49
104	July 29	@ Phillies	3–10	Halladay (13–4)	**Morton (8–6)**	—	45,599	54–50
105	July 30	@ Phillies	4–7	Lee (10–7)	**McDonald (7–5)**	Madson (18)	45,737	54–51
106	July 31	@ Phillies	5–6 (10)	Bastardo (4–0)	**Watson (0–2)**	—	45,809	54–52

August (8–22)

#	Date	Opponent	Score	Win	Loss	Save	Attendance	Record
107	August 1	Cubs	3–5	Zambrano (8–6)	**Maholm (6–11)**	Marmol (21)	22,248	54–53
108	August 2	Cubs	6–11	Wells (3–4)	**Correia (12–9)**	—	26,109	54–54
109	August 3	Cubs	0–1	Garza (5–8)	**Resop (3–3)**	Marmol (22)	19,106	54–55
110	August 4	Cubs	6–7	Samardzija (6–4)	**McCutchen (3–3)**	Marmol (23)	29,317	54–56
111	August 5	Padres	5–15	Harang (10–3)	**Karstens (8–6)**	—	37,766	54–57
112	August 6	Padres	2–13	Luebke (4–6)	**Maholm (6–12)**	—	39,251	54–58
113	August 7	Padres	3–7	Latos (6–11)	**Correia (12–10)**	—	35,601	54–59
114	August 8	@ Giants	5–0	**Morton (9–6)**	Vogelsong (9–2)	—	42,405	55–59
115	August 9	@ Giants	0–6	Bumgarner (7–11)	**McDonald (7–6)**	—	42,648	55–60
116	August 10	@ Giants	9–2	**Karstens (9–6)**	Sanchez (4–7)	—	42,603	56–60
117	August 12	@ Brewers	2–7	Greinke (11–4)	**Maholm (6–13)**	—	41,820	56–61
118	August 13	@ Brewers	0–1	Estrada (3–7)	**Correia (12–11)**	Axford (34)	43,214	56–62
119	August 14	@ Brewers	1–2 (10)	Saito (3–1)	**Resop (3–4)**	—	45,103	56–63
120	August 15	Cardinals	6–2	**McDonald (8–6)**	Westbrook (9–7)	—	19,766	57–63
121	August 16	Cardinals	5–4 (11)	**Resop (4–4)**	Rhodes (0–1)	—	20,943	58–63
122	August 17	Cardinals	2–7	Lohse (11–7)	**Maholm (6–14)**	—	22,296	58–64
123	August 19	Reds	8–11	Wood (6–5)	**Hanrahan (0–2)**	Cordero (25)	36,620	58–65
124	August 20	Reds	5–3	**Watson (1–2)**	Chapman (2–1)	**Hanrahan (31)**	37,826	59–65
125	August 21	Reds	4–5	Arredondo (3–3)	**Hanrahan (0–3)**	Cordero (26)	29,967	59–66
126	August 22	Brewers	1–8	Narveson (9–6)	**Karstens (9–7)**	—	—	59–67
127	August 22	Brewers	9–2	**McCutchen (4–3)**	Greinke (12–5)	—	19,380	60–67
128	August 23	Brewers	4–11	Estrada (4–8)	**Ohlendorf (0–1)**	—	21,411	60–68
129	August 24	Brewers	2–0	**Grilli (1–0)**	Marcum (11–4)	**Hanrahan (32)**	18,013	61–68
130	August 25	@ Cardinals	4–8	Jackson (3–2)	**Morton (9–7)**	—	36,503	61–69
131	August 26	@ Cardinals	4–5	McClellan (10–6)	**Veras (2–4)**	—	40,480	61–70
132	August 27	@ Cardinals	7–0	**Lincoln (1–0)**	Carpenter (8–9)	—	35,812	62–70
133	August 28	@ Cardinals	4–7	Lohse (12–8)	**Karstens (9–8)**	Motte (1)	38,429	62–71
134	August 29	@ Astros	4–7	Rodriguez (10–9)	**Grilli (1–1)**	Melancon (15)	19,250	62–72
135	August 30	@ Astros	2–8	Sosa (2–2)	**Morton (9–8)**	—	21,750	62–73
136	August 31	@ Astros	0–2	Happ (5–15)	**McDonald (8–7)**	Melancon (16)	22,918	62–74

September (10–16)

#	Date	Opponent	Score	Win	Loss	Save	Attendance	Record
137	September 1	Dodgers	4–6	Eveland (1–0)	**Lincoln (1–1)**	Jansen (3)	12,224	62–75
138	September 2	@ Cubs	3–1	**Burres (1–0)**	Dempster (10–11)	**Hanrahan (33)**	35,153	63–75
139	September 3	@ Cubs	7–5	**Resop (5–4)**	Marmol (2–5)	**Hanrahan (34)**	36,628	64–75
140	September 4	@ Cubs	3–6	Wells (7–4)	**Morton (9–9)**	Marshall (4)	40,469	64–76
141	September 5	Astros	3–1	**McDonald (9–7)**	Sosa (2–3)	**Hanrahan (35)**	13,366	65–76
142	September 6	Astros	1–4	Myers (4–13)	**Lincoln (1–2)**	Melancon (17)	9,840	65–77
143	September 7	Astros	5–4	**Watson (2–2)**	Lopez (2–6)	**Hanrahan (36)**	12,330	66–77
144	September 9	Marlins	4–13	Nolasco (10–10)	**Ohlendorf (0–2)**	—	24,527	66–78
145	September 10	Marlins	0–3	Sanchez (8–7)	**Locke (0–1)**	—	34,063	66–79
146	September 11	Marlins	1–4	Vazquez (10–11)	**McDonald (9–8)**	Oviedo (34)	19,071	66–80
147	September 12	Cardinals	6–5	**Grilli (2–1)**	Rzepczynski (0–2)	**Hanrahan (37)**	13,278	67–80
148	September 13	Cardinals	4–6	McClellan (11–6)	**Hanrahan (0–4)**	Motte (6)	16,544	67–81
149	September 14	Cardinals	2–3	Jackson (5–2)	**Morton (9–10)**	Motte (7)	12,520	67–82
150	September 15	@ Dodgers	6–2	**Ohlendorf (1–2)**	Eveland (2–1)	**Hanrahan (38)**	25,381	68–82
151	September 16	@ Dodgers	2–7	Kuroda (12–16)	**Locke (0–2)**	—	41,148	68–83
152	September 17	@ Dodgers	1–6	Lilly (10–14)	**McDonald (9–9)**	—	32,514	68–84
153	September 18	@ Dodgers	1–15	Billingsley (11–10)	**Lincoln (1–3)**	—	37,802	68–85
154	September 19	@ D-backs	0–1	Kennedy (20–4)	**Karstens (9–9)**	Putz (42)	24,458	68–86
155	September 20	@ D-backs	5–3	**Morton (10–10)**	Hudson (16–11)	**Hanrahan (39)**	30,114	69–86
156	September 21	@ D-backs	5–8	Miley (4–2)	**Ohlendorf (1–3)**	Putz (43)	25,296	69–87
157	September 23	Reds	4–3	**Hanrahan (1–4)**	Bray (5–3)	—	23,632	70–87
158	September 24	Reds	4–3	**Lincoln (2–3)**	Wood (6–6)	**Grilli (1)**	37,388	71–87
159	September 25	Reds	4–5	Willis (1–6)	**Moskos (1–1)**	Cordero (35)	28,758	71–88
160	September 26	@ Brewers	9–8	**McCutchen (5–3)**	Saito (4–2)	**Hanrahan (40)**	41,222	72–88
161	September 27	@ Brewers	4–6	Hawkins (3–1)	**Hughes (0–1)**	Axford (46)	41,864	72–89
162	September 28	@ Brewers	3–7	Greinke (16–6)	**Locke (0–3)**	—	41,976	72–90

Legend: = Win = Loss = Postponement
Bold = Pirates team member

== Season standings ==
=== National League Central ===
NL Central
Team	W	L	Pct.	GB	Home	Road
Milwaukee Brewers	96	66	.593	—	57‍–‍24	39‍–‍42
St. Louis Cardinals	90	72	.556	6	45‍–‍36	45‍–‍36
Cincinnati Reds	79	83	.488	17	42‍–‍39	37‍–‍44
Pittsburgh Pirates	72	90	.444	24	36‍–‍45	36‍–‍45
Chicago Cubs	71	91	.438	25	39‍–‍42	32‍–‍49
Houston Astros	56	106	.346	40	31‍–‍50	25‍–‍56

=== National League Wild Card ===
Division leaders
Team	W	L	Pct.
Philadelphia Phillies	102	60	.630
Milwaukee Brewers	96	66	.593
Arizona Diamondbacks	94	68	.580

Wild Card team (Top team qualifies for postseason)
Team	W	L	Pct.	GB
St. Louis Cardinals	90	72	.556	—
Atlanta Braves	89	73	.549	1
San Francisco Giants	86	76	.531	4
Los Angeles Dodgers	82	79	.509	7½
Washington Nationals	80	81	.497	9½
Cincinnati Reds	79	83	.488	11
New York Mets	77	85	.475	13
Colorado Rockies	73	89	.451	17
Florida Marlins	72	90	.444	18
Pittsburgh Pirates	72	90	.444	18
Chicago Cubs	71	91	.438	19
San Diego Padres	71	91	.438	19
Houston Astros	56	106	.346	34

=== Record vs. opponents ===
2011 National League record Source: MLB Standings Grid – 2011
Team	AZ	ATL	CHC	CIN	COL	FLA	HOU	LAD	MIL	NYM	PHI	PIT	SD	SF	STL	WSH	AL
Arizona	–	2–3	3–4	4–2	13–5	5–2	6–1	10–8	4–3	3–3	3–3	3–3	11–7	9–9	3–4	5–3	10–8
Atlanta	3–2	–	4–3	3–3	6–2	12–6	5–1	2–5	5–3	9–9	6–12	4–2	4–5	6–1	1–5	9–9	10–5
Chicago	4–3	3–4	–	7–11	2–4	3–3	8–7	3–3	6–10	4–2	2–5	8–8	3–3	5–4	5–10	3–4	5–10
Cincinnati	2–4	3–3	11–7	–	3–4	3–3	9–6	4–2	8–8	2–5	1–7	5–10	4–2	5–2	9–6	4–2	7–11
Colorado	5–13	2–6	4–2	4–3	–	3–3	5–2	9–9	3–6	5–2	1–4	4–3	9–9	5–13	2–4	4–3	8–7
Florida	2–5	6–12	3–3	3–3	3–3	–	6–1	3–3	0–7	9–9	6–12	6–0	0–7	4–2	2–6	11–7	8–10
Houston	1–6	1–5	7–8	6–9	2–5	1–6	–	4–5	3–12	3–3	2–4	7–11	3–5	4–3	5–10	3–3	4–11
Los Angeles	8–10	5–2	3–3	2–4	9–9	3–3	5–4	–	2–4	2–5	1–5	6–2	13–5	9–9	4–3	4–2	6–9
Milwaukee	3–4	3–5	10–6	8–8	6–3	7–0	12–3	4–2	–	4–2	3–4	12–3	3–2	3–3	9–9	3–3	6–9
New York	3–3	9–9	2–4	5–2	2–5	9–9	3–3	5–2	2–4	–	7–11	4–4	4–3	2–4	3–3	8–10	9–9
Philadelphia	3–3	12–6	5–2	7–1	4–1	12–6	4–2	5–1	4–3	11–7	–	4–2	7–1	4–3	3–6	8–10	9–6
Pittsburgh	3–3	2–4	8–8	10–5	3–4	0–6	11–7	2–6	3–12	4–4	2–4	–	2–4	3–3	7–9	4–4	8–7
San Diego	7–11	5–4	3–3	2–4	9–9	7–0	5–3	5–13	2–3	3–4	1–7	4–2	–	6–12	3–3	3–4	6–9
San Francisco	9–9	1–6	4–5	2–5	13–5	2–4	3–4	9–9	3–3	4–2	3–4	3–3	12–6	–	5–2	3–4	10–5
St. Louis	4–3	5–1	10–5	6–9	4–2	6–2	10–5	3–4	9–9	3–3	6–3	9–7	3–3	2–5	–	2–4	8–7
Washington	3–5	9–9	4–3	2–4	3–4	7–11	3–3	2–4	3–3	10–8	10–8	4–4	4–3	4–3	4–2	–	8–7

=== Detailed records ===
National League
Opponent	W	L	WP	RS	RA
NL East
Atlanta Braves	2	4	0.333	14	15
Florida Marlins	0	6	0.000	10	41
New York Mets	4	4	0.500	32	38
Philadelphia Phillies	2	4	0.333	23	34
Washington Nationals	4	4	0.500	35	25
Total	12	22	0.353	114	153
NL Central
Chicago Cubs	8	8	0.500	77	64
Cincinnati Reds	10	5	0.667	67	57
Houston Astros	11	7	0.611	68	64
Milwaukee Brewers	3	12	0.200	46	84
St. Louis Cardinals	7	9	0.438	62	72
Total	39	41	0.488	320	341
NL West
Arizona Diamondbacks	3	3	0.500	21	21
Colorado Rockies	3	4	0.429	26	30
Los Angeles Dodgers	2	6	0.250	21	49
San Diego Padres	2	4	0.333	26	48
San Francisco Giants	3	3	0.500	20	16
Total	13	20	0.394	114	164
American League
Baltimore Orioles	2	1	0.667	17	15
Boston Red Sox	2	1	0.667	11	9
Cleveland Indians	0	3	0.000	4	15
Detroit Tigers	2	1	0.667	16	5
Toronto Blue Jays	2	1	0.667	14	10
Total	8	7	0.533	62	54
Season Total	72	90	0.444	610	712

Month	Games	Won	Lost	Win %	RS	RA
April	27	12	15	0.444	91	115
May	26	13	13	0.500	108	91
June	27	16	11	0.593	105	106
July	26	13	13	0.500	102	98
August	30	8	22	0.267	113	167
September	26	10	16	0.385	91	135
Total	162	72	90	0.444	610	712

	Games	Won	Lost	Win %	RS	RA
Home	81	36	45	0.444	287	360
Away	81	36	45	0.444	323	352
Total	162	72	90	0.444	610	712

== Roster ==
2011 Pittsburgh Pirates
Roster
Pitchers: 45 José Ascanio; 97 Joe Beimel; 71 Brian Burres; 29 Kevin Correia; 60 Michael Crotta; 39 Jason Grilli; 52 Joel Hanrahan; 70 Jared Hughes; 27 Jeff Karstens; 63 Chris Leroux; 32 Brad Lincoln; 61 Jeff Locke; 28 Paul Maholm; 34 Daniel McCutchen; 53 James McDonald; 47 Evan Meek; 50 Charlie Morton; 57 Daniel Moskos; 49 Ross Ohlendorf; 36 Garrett Olson; 30 Chris Resop; 60 Aaron Thompson; 48,43 José Veras; 65 Tony Watson; 48 Tim Wood	Catchers: 26 Dusty Brown; 41 Ryan Doumit; 69 Eric Fryer; 35 Jason Jaramillo; 55 Michael McKenry; 48 Matt Pagnozzi; 19 Chris Snyder; 68 Wyatt Toregas; Infielders: 24 Pedro Alvarez; 5 Ronny Cedeño; 3 Pedro Ciriaco; 12 Chase d'Arnaud; 62 Josh Harrison; 25 Derrek Lee; 37 Lyle Overbay; 51 Steven Pearce; 10 Josh Rodriguez; 18 Neil Walker; 2 Brandon Wood	Outfielders: 14 John Bowker; 23 Matt Diaz; 46 Garrett Jones; 36 Ryan Ludwick; 22 Andrew McCutchen; 38 Xavier Paul; 44 Alex Presley; 31 José Tábata	Manager: 13 Clint Hurdle; Coaches: 86 Heberto Andrade (bullpen catcher); 55,17 Jeff Banister (bench); 16 Nick Leyva (third base); 58 Gregg Ritchie (hitting); 56 Euclides Rojas (bullpen); 54 Ray Searage (pitching); 15 Luis Silverio (first base); 59 Mark Strittmatter (coach)

=== Opening Day lineup ===
Opening Day Starters
Name	Position
José Tábata	LF
Neil Walker	2B
Andrew McCutchen	CF
Lyle Overbay	1B
Pedro Alvarez	3B
Ryan Doumit	C
Garrett Jones	RF
Ronny Cedeño	SS
Kevin Correia	SP

== Player stats ==
=== Batting ===
Note: G = Games played; AB = At bats; R = Runs; H = Hits; 2B = Doubles; 3B = Triples; HR = Home runs; RBI = Runs batted in; SB = Stolen bases; BB = Walks; AVG = Batting average; SLG = Slugging average

Player	G	AB	R	H	2B	3B	HR	RBI	SB	BB	AVG	SLG
Neil Walker	159	596	76	163	36	4	12	83	9	54	.273	.408
Andrew McCutchen	158	572	87	148	34	5	23	89	23	89	.259	.456
Garrett Jones	148	423	51	103	30	1	16	58	6	48	.243	.433
Ronny Cedeño	128	413	43	103	25	3	2	32	2	30	.249	.339
Lyle Overbay	103	352	40	80	17	1	8	37	1	36	.227	.349
José Tábata	91	334	53	89	18	1	4	21	16	40	.266	.362
Brandon Wood	99	236	25	52	9	0	7	31	0	19	.220	.347
Pedro Álvarez	74	235	18	45	9	1	4	19	1	24	.191	.289
Xavier Paul	121	232	30	59	6	5	2	20	16	13	.254	.349
Ryan Doumit	77	218	17	66	12	1	8	30	0	16	.303	.477
Matt Diaz	100	216	14	56	12	1	0	19	4	11	.259	.324
Alex Presley	52	215	27	64	12	6	4	20	9	13	.298	.465
Josh Harrison	65	195	21	53	13	2	1	16	4	3	.272	.374
Michael McKenry	58	180	17	40	12	0	2	11	0	14	.222	.322
Chase d'Arnaud	48	143	17	31	6	2	0	6	12	4	.217	.287
Ryan Ludwick	38	112	14	26	5	0	2	11	0	19	.232	.330
Derrek Lee	28	101	16	34	2	1	7	18	0	8	.337	.584
Chris Snyder	34	96	13	26	3	0	3	17	0	17	.271	.396
Steve Pearce	50	94	8	19	2	0	1	10	0	7	.202	.255
Jason Jaramillo	23	43	1	14	3	0	0	6	1	2	.326	.395
Pedro Ciriaco	23	33	4	10	2	1	0	6	2	1	.303	.424
Dusty Brown	11	28	2	3	0	0	0	0	1	1	.107	.107
Eric Fryer	10	26	5	7	0	0	0	0	1	3	.269	.269
John Bowker	19	17	0	4	1	0	0	2	0	2	.235	.294
Josh Rodriguez	7	12	1	1	0	0	0	1	0	1	.083	.083
Matt Pagnozzi	5	8	0	2	0	0	0	1	0	0	.250	.250
Wyatt Toregas	3	4	0	0	0	0	0	0	0	0	.000	.000
Pitcher totals	162	287	10	27	8	0	1	16	0	14	.094	.132
Team totals	162	5421	610	1325	277	35	107	580	108	489	.244	.368

=== Pitching ===
Note: W = Wins; L = Losses; ERA = Earned run average; G = Games pitched; GS = Games started; SV = Saves; IP = Innings pitched; H = Hits allowed; R = Runs allowed; ER = Earned runs allowed; BB = Walks allowed; SO = Strikeouts

Player	W	L	ERA	G	GS	SV	IP	H	R	ER	BB	SO
Charlie Morton	10	10	3.83	29	29	0	171.2	186	82	73	77	110
James McDonald	9	9	4.21	31	31	0	171.0	176	86	80	78	142
Paul Maholm	6	14	3.66	26	26	0	162.1	160	72	66	50	97
Jeff Karstens	9	9	3.38	30	26	0	162.1	163	69	61	33	96
Kevin Correia	12	11	4.79	27	26	0	154.0	175	90	82	39	77
Daniel McCutchen	5	3	3.72	73	0	0	84.2	87	38	35	33	47
José Veras	2	4	3.80	79	0	1	71.0	54	32	30	34	79
Chris Resop	5	4	4.39	76	0	1	69.2	73	34	34	30	79
Joel Hanrahan	1	4	1.83	70	0	40	68.2	56	17	14	16	61
Brad Lincoln	2	3	4.72	12	8	0	47.2	54	27	25	16	29
Tony Watson	2	2	3.95	43	0	0	41.0	34	18	18	20	37
Ross Ohlendorf	1	3	8.15	9	9	0	38.2	60	38	35	15	27
Jason Grilli	2	1	2.48	28	0	1	32.2	24	10	9	15	37
Joe Beimel	1	1	5.33	35	0	0	25.1	34	17	15	9	17
Chris Leroux	1	1	2.88	23	0	0	25.0	26	9	8	7	24
Daniel Moskos	1	1	2.96	31	0	0	24.1	29	11	8	9	11
Evan Meek	1	1	3.48	24	0	0	20.2	27	11	8	12	17
Jeff Locke	0	3	6.48	4	4	0	16.2	21	12	12	10	5
Brian Burres	1	0	3.86	5	2	0	14.0	12	6	6	4	10
Jared Hughes	0	1	4.09	12	0	0	11.0	9	5	5	4	10
Michael Crotta	0	1	9.28	15	0	0	10.2	20	11	11	5	7
Tim Wood	0	3	5.63	13	0	0	8.0	8	5	5	8	2
Aaron Thompson	0	0	7.04	4	1	0	7.2	13	6	6	6	1
José Ascanio	0	0	7.11	8	0	0	6.1	10	5	5	2	5
Garrett Olson	1	1	2.08	4	0	0	4.1	2	1	1	3	4
Team totals	72	90	4.04	162	162	43	1449.1	1513	712	650	535	1031

== Notable achievements ==
=== Awards ===
2011 Major League Baseball All-Star Game

- Joel Hanrahan, P, reserve
- Andrew McCutchen, OF, reserve
- Kevin Correia, P, reserve

NL Player of the Week

- Jeff Karstens (July 11–17, 2011)

MLB Delivery Man of the Month Award

- Joel Hanrahan (June 2011)

=== Milestones ===
Regular season
Player	Milestone	Reached
G. Olson	100th Career Game	April 1, 2011
P. Maholm	100th Career Inning Pitched	April 14, 2011
C. Resop	100th Career Game	May 20, 2011
J. Karstens	100th Career Game	May 25, 2011
J. Veras	200th Career Game	May 21, 2011
L. Overbay	300th Career Double	June 8, 2011
L. Overbay	1200th Career Game	June 12, 2011
M. Diaz	500th Career Hit	July 23, 2011
R. Doumit	500th Career Hit	August 15, 2011
R. Cedeño	500th Career Hit	August 17, 2011
D. McCutchen	100th Career Game	Sep 7, 2011
J. Karstens	500th Career Inning Pitched	Sep 19, 2011

== Transactions ==
=== Pre-season ===
- On November 3, 2010, the Pittsburgh Pirates re-signed Wil Ledezma to a 1-year contract.
- On November 12, 2010, the Pittsburgh Pirates lost free agent Erik Kratz to the Philadelphia Phillies.
- On November 15, 2010, the Pittsburgh Pirates hired Clint Hurdle as manager.
- On November 19, 2010, the Pittsburgh Pirates lost free agent Hector Gimenez to the Los Angeles Dodgers.
- On November 22, 2010, the Pittsburgh Pirates lost free agent Dana Eveland to the Los Angeles Dodgers.
- On November 24, 2010, the Pittsburgh Pirates hired Euclides Rojas as bullpen coach, Gregg Ritchie as hitting coach, Luis Silverio as first-base coach, Nick Leyva as third-base coach and Mark Strittmatter.
- On November 24, 2010, the Pittsburgh Pirates traded Zach Duke to the Arizona Diamondbacks for a player to be named later (Cesar Valdez).
- On December 3, 2010, the Pittsburgh Pirates re-signed Jeff Karstens to a 1-year contract and Ronny Cedeño to a 1-year contract with an option for 2012.
- On December 7, 2010, the Pittsburgh Pirates signed free agents Kevin Correia to a 2-year contract and Scott Olsen to a 1-year contract with an option for 2012.
- On December 8, 2010, the Pittsburgh Pirates signed free agent Matt Diaz to a 2-year contract.
- On December 14, 2010, the Pittsburgh Pirates signed free agent Lyle Overbay to a 1-year contract.
- On December 23, 2010, the Pittsburgh Pirates traded Ryan Kelly to the Oakland Athletics in exchange for Corey Wimberly.
- On December 23, 2010, the Pittsburgh Pirates claimed free agent Aaron Thompson off waivers from the Washington Nationals.
- On January 4, 2011, the Pittsburgh Pirates traded Joe Martinez to the Cleveland Indians in exchange for a player to be named later or cash considerations.
- On January 5, 2011, the Pittsburgh Pirates lost free agent Wil Ledezma to the Toronto Blue Jays.
- On January 18, 2011, the Pittsburgh Pirates re-signed Joel Hanrahan to a 1-year contract.
- On February 9, 2011, the Pittsburgh Pirates re-signed Ross Ohlendorf to a 1-year/$2.025 million contract.

=== In-Season ===
- On March 3, 2011, the Pittsburgh Pirates re-signed Alex Presley, Andrew McCutchen, Bryan Morris, Brad Lincoln, Charlie Morton, Chris Leroux, Chris Resop, Daniel McCutchen, Daniel Moskos, Evan Meek, Garrett Jones, Gorkys Hernández, James McDonald, Jason Jaramillo, Jeff Locke, John Bowker, José Ascanio, José Tábata, Josh Rodriguez, Kevin Hart, Kyle McPherson, Mike Crotta, Neil Walker, Pedro Ciriaco, Ramon Aguero, Steve Pearce and Tony Watson to 1-year contracts.
- On March 21, 2011, the Pittsburgh Pirates released Garrett Atkins.
- On March 22, 2011, the Pittsburgh Pirates released Fernando Nieve.
- On April 6, 2011, the Pittsburgh Pirates released Craig Hansen.
- On April 8, 2011, the Pittsburgh Pirates lost free agent Ramon Aguero to the Texas Rangers.
- On April 22, 2011, the Pittsburgh Pirates claimed free agent Brandon Wood from the Los Angeles Angels.
- On April 26, 2011, the Pittsburgh Pirates claimed free agent Xavier Paul from the Los Angeles Dodgers.
- On May 14, 2011, the Pittsburgh Pirates released Scott Olsen.
- On June 13, 2011, the Pittsburgh Pirates traded a player to be named later or cash considerations to the Boston Red Sox in exchange for Michael McKenry.
- On June 21, 2011, the Pittsburgh Pirates traded cash considerations to the Cleveland Indians in exchange for Josh Rodriguez.
- On July 21, 2011, the Pittsburgh Pirates signed free agent Jason Grilli to a 1-year contract.
- On July 31, 2011, the Pittsburgh Pirates traded Aaron Baker to the Baltimore Orioles in exchange for Derrek Lee.
- On July 31, 2011, the Pittsburgh Pirates traded a player to be named later or cash considerations to the San Diego Padres in exchange for Ryan Ludwick.
- On August 18, 2011, the Pittsburgh Pirates traded a player to be named later or cash considerations to the Texas Rangers in exchange for Tim Wood.
- On August 21, 2011, the Pittsburgh Pirates re-signed José Tábata to a 6-year contract extension through 2016 with options for 2017–19.
- On August 31, 2011, the Pittsburgh Pirates traded Matt Diaz and cash considerations to the Atlanta Braves in exchange for a player to be named later (Eliecer Cardenas; converted on September 20, 2011).
- On August 31, 2011, the Pittsburgh Pirates traded John Bowker to the Philadelphia Phillies in exchange for future considerations.
- On September 11, 2011, the Pittsburgh Pirates re-signed Neal Huntington as senior VP and GM to a 3-year contract extension through 2014.
- On September 14, 2011, the Pittsburgh Pirates claimed Matt Pagnozzi off waivers from the Colorado Rockies.
- On September 16, 2011, the Pittsburgh Pirates promoted Greg Smith to assistant GM, Joe Dellicarri to director of amateur scouting, Kevan Graves to director of baseball operations, Kyle Stark to assistant GM, Larry Broadway to director of minor league operations and Tyrone Brooks to director of player personnel.
- On October 24, 2011, the Pittsburgh Pirates hired Ben Potenziano as assistant trainer and Brendon Huttman as strength and conditioning coach.

== Farm system ==
Level	Team	League	Manager
AAA	Indianapolis Indians	International League	Dean Treanor
AA	Altoona Curve	Eastern League	P. J. Forbes
A	Bradenton Marauders	Florida State League	Carlos García
A	West Virginia Power	South Atlantic League	Gary Robinson
A-Short Season	State College Spikes	New York–Penn League	Dave Turgeon
Rookie	GCL Pirates	Gulf Coast League	Tom Prince
Rookie	DSL Pirates	Dominican Summer League	Ramon Zapata
Rookie	VSL Pirates	Venezuelan Summer League	Osmin Melendez
