= Matt Pagnozzi =

American baseball player (born 1982)

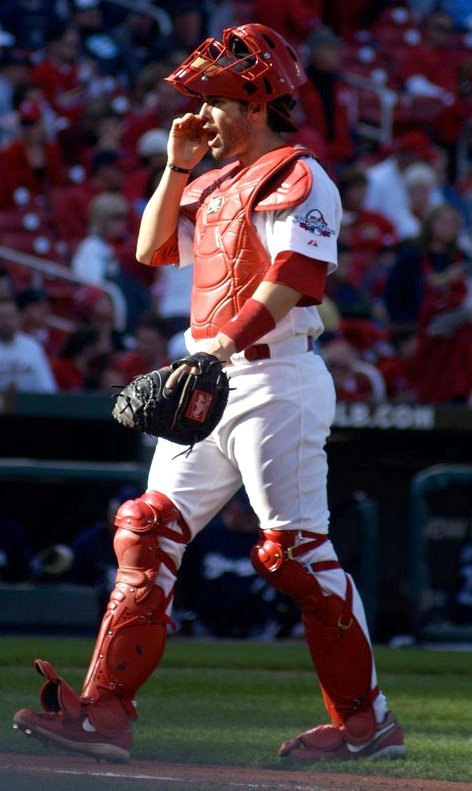
- Pagnozzi with the St. Louis Cardinals
- Catcher
- Born: November 10, 1982 (age 43); Miami, Arizona, U.S.
- Batted: Right Threw: Right

MLB debut
- September 29, 2009, for the St. Louis Cardinals

Last MLB appearance
- September 7, 2014, for the Milwaukee Brewers

MLB statistics
- Batting average: .272
- Home runs: 1
- Runs batted in: 13
- Stats at Baseball Reference

Teams
- St. Louis Cardinals (2009–2010); Colorado Rockies (2011); Pittsburgh Pirates (2011); Houston Astros (2013); Milwaukee Brewers (2014)

Matthew Thomas Pagnozzi (born November 10, 1982) is an American former professional baseball catcher who played in Major League Baseball (MLB) for the St. Louis Cardinals, Colorado Rockies, Pittsburgh Pirates, Houston Astros, and Milwaukee Brewers.

Pagnozzi attended Highland High School in Gilbert, Arizona, and then Central Arizona College. The St. Louis Cardinals selected him in the eighth round of the 2003 June amateur draft as the 245th pick overall.

== Career ==
=== St. Louis Cardinals ===
Pagnozzi made his professional baseball debut with the New Jersey Cardinals of the New York–Penn League. By 2008, he had advanced to the Memphis Redbirds, the AAA affiliate of the St. Louis Cardinals. In September 2009, the Cardinals called him up to the major leagues when rosters expanded. He made his MLB league debut on September 29, 2009, appearing as a pinch hitter and drawing a walk. Pagnozzi hit his first and only major league home run on September 28, 2010, against the Pittsburgh Pirates.

=== Colorado Rockies ===
On November 29, 2010, Pagnozzi signed a minor league contract with the Colorado Rockies. He was purchased on June 17, 2011.

=== Pittsburgh Pirates ===
On Wednesday September 14, 2011, Pagnozzi was claimed off waivers by the Pittsburgh Pirates. The Pirates had previously tried to acquire Pagnozzi in June 2011, after catchers Ryan Doumit and Chris Snyder went down with injuries. Those talks failed, and the Pirates instead received Michael McKenry from the Boston Red Sox. Pagnozzi was set be the 52nd player to appear in a game for the Pirates in 2011, breaking the franchise record of 51 players set the year before. The record number of players to appear on the team is due to the large number of injuries sustained by the team in 2011.

=== Cleveland Indians ===
Pagnozzi signed a minor-league contract with the Cleveland Indians on December 2, 2011. His contract included an invitation to major-league spring training.

=== Atlanta Braves ===
On December 4, 2012, Pagnozzi signed a minor league deal with the Atlanta Braves with an invitation to spring training. He was expected to provide depth at catcher and serve as a back-up to Gerald Laird while Brian McCann missed the month of April with injury, but Pagnozzi was passed on the depth charts due to the emergence of Evan Gattis. As a result, Pagnozzi spent the majority of the 2013 season with AAA Gwinnett.

=== Houston Astros ===
On September 3, 2013, Pagnozzi was traded to the Houston Astros for cash considerations. He was outrighted off the roster on October 2, 2013, and elected free agency the next day.

=== Milwaukee Brewers ===
Pagnozzi signed a minor league deal with the Milwaukee Brewers on December 4, 2013. He played the entire 2014 season with the Triple-A Nashville Sounds, before having his contract purchased by the Brewers on September 1. He was outrighted off the roster on October 2, 2014, and elected free agency on October 12.

=== Arizona Diamondbacks ===
On November 6, 2014, Pagnozzi signed a minor league contract with the Arizona Diamondbacks.

== Personal life ==
His uncle, Tom Pagnozzi, was a three-time Gold Glove winning catcher for the Cardinals from 1987 through 1998.
