= Josh Rodriguez =

American baseball player (born 1984)

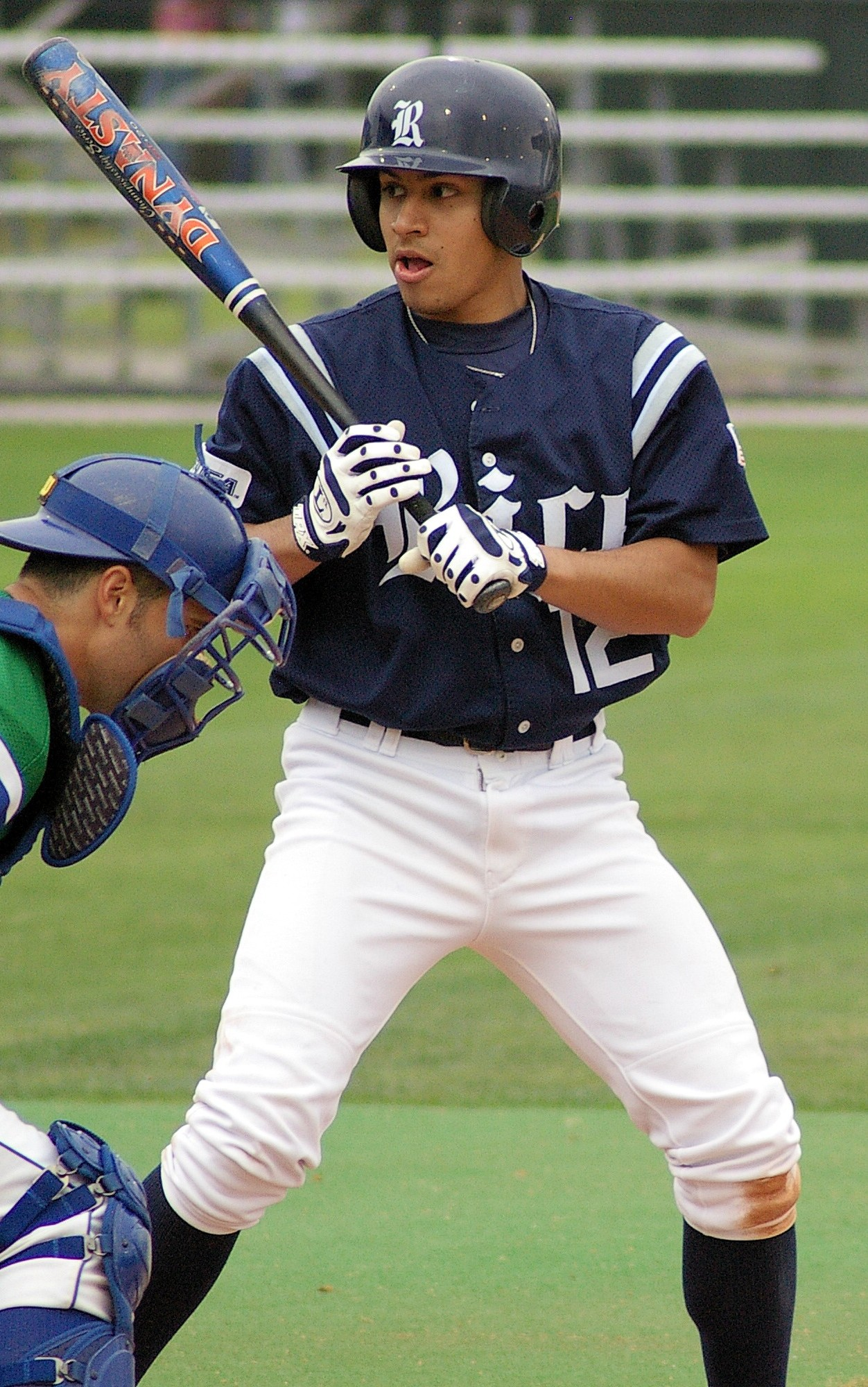
- Rodriguez at Rice in 2006
- Infielder
- Born: December 18, 1984 (age 41); Houston, Texas, U.S.
- Batted: Right Threw: Right

MLB debut
- April 5, 2011, for the Pittsburgh Pirates

Last MLB appearance
- April 21, 2011, for the Pittsburgh Pirates

MLB statistics
- Batting average: .083
- Home runs: 0
- Runs batted in: 1
- Stats at Baseball Reference

Teams
- Pittsburgh Pirates (2011)

Joshua Joel Rodriguez (born December 18, 1984) is an American former professional baseball infielder. He has previously played in Major League Baseball (MLB) for the Pittsburgh Pirates.

== Amateur career ==
Rodriguez attended Rice University. There, he played college baseball for the Rice Owls baseball team in the Western Athletic Conference (WAC) of the National Collegiate Athletic Association's (NCAA) Division I. He was named WAC Freshman of the Year in 2004 and the Third Team NCAA Division I All-American third baseman in 2006, the year after Rice joined Conference USA.

== Professional career ==
=== Cleveland Indians ===
Rodriguez was selected by the Cleveland Indians in the second round of the 2006 Major League Baseball draft. Rodriguez played for the Double–A Akron Aeros of the Eastern League (EL) in 2008, 2009, and the first part of 2010. On May 18, 2010, Rodriguez was promoted to the Triple–A Columbus Clippers of the International League (IL). He hit .293 in 86 games.

=== Pittsburgh Pirates ===
On December 9, 2010, the Pirates selected Rodriguez with the first overall pick of the 2010 Rule 5 draft. Under the rules regarding Rule 5 players, Rodriguez had to stay on the team's major league roster for the entire 2011 season, or be offered back to the Indians.

On March 27, 2011. the Pirates announced that Rodriguez would be on the team's Opening Day roster, after infielder Pedro Ciriaco was optioned to the Triple–A Indianapolis Indians. Pirates general manager Neal Huntington stated Rodriguez proved during spring training that he is adept enough defensively to hold his own in the big leagues. Huntington also added that "[Rodriguez] is not your typical Rule 5 guy. He's a little better-equipped to handle the major league environment than a typical Rule 5 guy." The announcement of Rodriguez being named to the Pirates Opening Day roster came moments after he and Ciriaco helped the team defeat the Tampa Bay Rays in a spring training game by scoring on a throwing error in the bottom of the ninth inning to give the Pirates a 5-4 victory. He was designated for assignment on April 22 to make room for Brandon Wood on the roster. The Cleveland Indians reacquired him on April 29 and assigned him to Triple–A Columbus. However, he was traded back to Pittsburgh on June 21 for cash considerations. In the Pirates minor league system, he played for the Indianapolis Indians of the IL and the Altoona Curve of the EL. In the 2011 season he played for Pittsburgh, Indianapolis, Altoona, and Columbus.

=== New York Mets ===
On March 29, 2012, Rodriguez signed a minor league deal with the New York Mets. Rodriguez began the year with the Binghamton Mets of the EL. He was named EL Player of the Week on April 23.

=== Miami Marlins ===
On January 27, 2014, Rodriguez signed a minor league contract with the Miami Marlins organization and was assigned to the Triple-A New Orleans Zephyrs to begin the season.

=== New York Mets (second stint) ===
On March 8, 2015, Rodriguez signed a minor league deal with the New York Mets. He was assigned to the Triple–A Las Vegas 51s. On April 2, Rodriguez was demoted to the Double-A Binghamton Mets.

=== Oakland Athletics ===
On November 25, 2015, Rodriguez signed a minor league contract with the Oakland Athletics. He began the 2016 season with the Double-A Midland RockHounds, but was promoted to the Triple-A Nashville Sounds in late April. In 88 games between the two affiliates, Rodriguez hit .263/.381/.420 with nine home runs and 53 RBI. He elected free agency following the season on November 7, 2016.

On November 8, 2016, Rodriguez re–signed with Oakland on a new minor league contract. He was released during spring training.

=== New York Mets (third stint) ===
On April 3, 2017, Rodriguez signed a minor league deal with the New York Mets and was assigned to the Triple–A Las Vegas 51s. In 106 games for Las Vegas, Rodriguez hit .242/.299/.395 with 12 home runs and 44 RBI. He elected free agency following the season on November 6.

=== Toros de Tijuana ===
On March 20, 2018, Rodriguez signed with the Toros de Tijuana of the Mexican League. In 18 games for Tijuana, he hit .160/.276/.200 with no home runs, two RBI, and one stolen base.

=== Tecolotes de los Dos Laredos ===
On May 3, 2018, Rodriguez was traded to the Tecolotes de los Dos Laredos of the Mexican Baseball League. He appeared in 66 games for the club, collecting 61 hits and 9 home runs. In 2019, Rodriguez slashed .312/.385/.526 with 22 home runs and 88 RBI in 117 games for the team. Rodriguez did not play in a game in 2020 due to the cancellation of the Mexican League season because of the COVID-19 pandemic.

In 2021, Rodriguez played in 53 games for Dos Laredos, batting .230/.302/.410 with 6 home runs and 24 RBI. For the 2022 season, he made 77 appearances for the Tecolotes, hitting .224/.303/.354 with 7 home runs and 35 RBI.

=== Mariachis de Guadalajara ===
On February 11, 2023, Rodriguez signed with the Mariachis de Guadalajara of the Mexican League. In 74 games for Guadalajara, Rodriguez batted .300/.368/.463 with 9 home runs and 44 RBI.

=== Tecolotes de los Dos Laredos (second stint) ===
On August 1, 2023, Rodriguez was traded to the Tecolotes de los Dos Laredos of the Mexican League. In 4 games for the team, he went 6–for–14 (.429) with one home run and four RBI.

In 8 games for the club in 2024, Rodriguez went 6–for–26 (.231) with no home runs and three RBI. On May 10, 2024, he was released by Dos Laredos.

== See also ==
- Rule 5 draft results
