= Ryan Church =

American baseball player (born 1978)

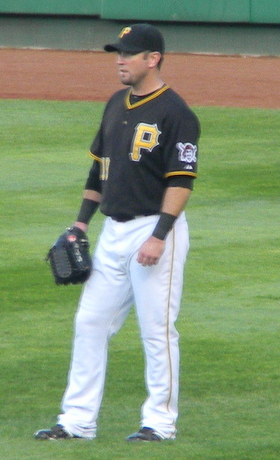
- Church with the Pittsburgh Pirates in 2010
- Outfielder
- Born: October 14, 1978 (age 47); Santa Barbara, California, U.S.
- Batted: Left Threw: Left

MLB debut
- August 21, 2004, for the Montreal Expos

Last MLB appearance
- October 2, 2010, for the Arizona Diamondbacks

MLB statistics
- Batting average: .264
- Home runs: 56
- Runs batted in: 267
- Stats at Baseball Reference

Teams
- Montreal Expos / Washington Nationals (2004–2007); New York Mets (2008–2009); Atlanta Braves (2009); Pittsburgh Pirates (2010); Arizona Diamondbacks (2010)

Ryan Matthew Church (born October 14, 1978) is an American former professional baseball outfielder. He played in Major League Baseball (MLB) for the Montreal Expos / Washington Nationals, New York Mets, Atlanta Braves, Pittsburgh Pirates, and Arizona Diamondbacks.

== Career ==
=== Minors ===
Drafted by the Cleveland Indians in the 14th round of the 2000 Major League Baseball draft, Church signed June 7, 2000, after graduation from the University of Nevada, Reno. By January 2004, he was traded by the Indians with Maicer Izturis to the Montreal Expos for Scott Stewart.

=== Montreal Expos / Washington Nationals ===
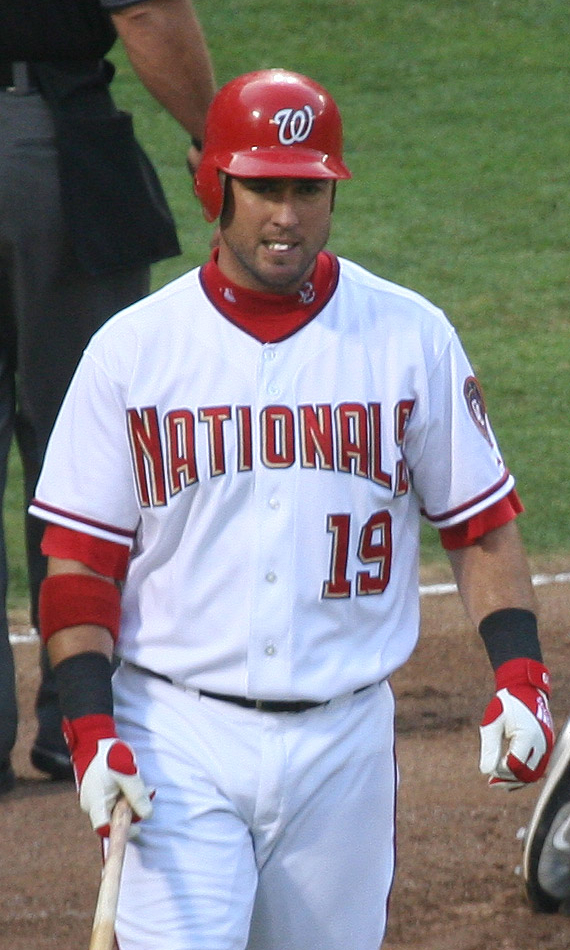
Church with the Nationals in 2007

Church made his major league debut for the Expos in August 2004, struggling in the 30 games he played in the last two months of the season. He ended the season with a .187 batting average.

After struggling in the first month of the 2005 season Church was considered a candidate for the Rookie of the Year Award, until he injured himself running into the outfield wall at PNC Park on June 22, 2005. At the time of the incident, Church was batting .325 with a .544 slugging percentage. After the incident, Church made two trips to the disabled list and was unable to match his hitting performance from the first half of the season.

In 2006, Church was demoted to Triple-A New Orleans after struggling early in the year. However, Church was sent back to the majors on July 23, and ended up hitting .276 with a career best 10 home runs and .892 OPS. His 10 home runs in just 196 at-bats in 2006 projects to around 30 home runs for an entire season.

In 2007, Church had career highs in games (144), at bats (470), runs (57), hits (128), doubles (43), home runs (15), and RBI (70). He finished the year batting .272, slugging .464 and a .813 OPS.

=== New York Mets ===
After the 2007 season, Church was mentioned in trade talks, with the Chicago Cubs, Los Angeles Angels of Anaheim and Minnesota Twins all reportedly interested in his services. However, on November 30, 2007, Church was traded, along with Brian Schneider, to the New York Mets for Lastings Milledge.

In spring training 2008, Church was involved in a collision with first baseman Marlon Anderson that resulted in a Grade 2 concussion for Church. He recovered without any serious injuries. On May 20, 2008, Church suffered a minor concussion while sliding into Atlanta Braves shortstop Yunel Escobar. It appeared as though when Church initially slid, his head made contact with Escobar's right knee. After Church struck his head, he slid about eight feet past second base with his forehead dragging on the dirt. Church made his return to the starting lineup on June 1, 2008, against the Los Angeles Dodgers, collecting three hits including a home run and a double. However, he was placed on the disabled list with aftereffects of the concussion. On September 3, Church had his second career grand slam, off Dave Bush. On September 28, Church made the final out in Shea Stadium history in a 4–2 Mets loss.

=== Atlanta Braves ===
On July 10, 2009, he was traded to the Atlanta Braves for Jeff Francoeur, but was designated for assignment on December 8, 2009, in order to make room for the return of Rafael Soriano.

On December 12, 2009, the Braves decided to non-tender Church, making him a free agent.

=== Pittsburgh Pirates ===
On January 11, 2010, Church agreed to a deal with the Pittsburgh Pirates.

=== Arizona Diamondbacks ===
On July 31, 2010, Church, Bobby Crosby and D. J. Carrasco were traded to the Arizona Diamondbacks for Chris Snyder and Pedro Ciriaco. He was non-tendered following the 2010 season, despite a .265/.345/.490 line in 55 plate appearances with the Diamondbacks.

== Controversy ==
In 2005, the Nationals suspended Jon Moeller, a volunteer chaplain, and issued an apology after Church, a devout Christian, revealed conversations he had with him about a Jewish former girlfriend. Church told the Washington Post that the chaplain nodded when he asked whether Jews were "doomed" because they "don't believe in Jesus." After Jewish community leaders complained, Church issued a statement saying, "I am not the type of person who would call into question the religious beliefs of others."

Preceded by Clint Barmes	National League Rookie of the Month; May 2005	Succeeded by Garrett Atkins
