= Jerry Meals =

American baseball umpire (born 1961)

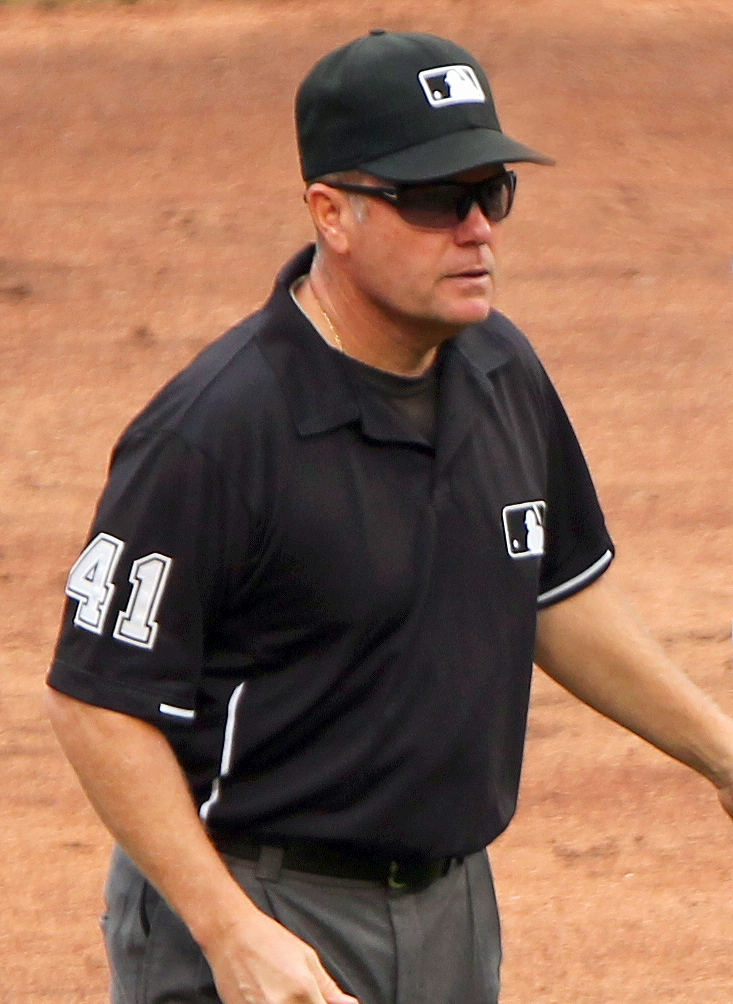
- Meals umpiring in 2011
- Born: October 20, 1961 (age 65); Butler, Pennsylvania, U.S.

MLB debut
- September 14, 1992

Last appearance
- October 8, 2022

Career highlights and awards
- Special Assignments: All-Star Game (2002, 2015); Wild Card Games/Series (2020, 2021, 2022); Division Series (1999, 2004, 2005, 2009, 2010, 2011, 2014, 2019, 2020); League Championship Series (2008, 2017, 2021); World Series (2014, 2020); World Baseball Classic (2009)

Gerald William Meals (born October 20, 1961) is an American former Major League Baseball umpire. After serving as an NL reserve umpire from 1992 to 1997, he became a full-time umpire in 1998. Meals was promoted to crew chief in 2015, and worked the World Series in 2014 and 2020. He retired following the 2022 season.

== Early life and career ==
Meals was a 1979 graduate of Salem High School, where he played second base and briefly competed on the wrestling team. After umpiring local baseball for four years, Meals graduated from the Joe Brinkman Umpire School in 1983. At age 21, Meals received his first minor league umpiring assignment in the Class A Appalachian League. By 1985, Meals had moved to the South Atlantic League, where he was partnered with 20-year-old future MLB umpire Wally Bell. While working in the Southern League in 1989, Meals was featured in an ESPN documentary on minor league umpires. His family and fellow umpires Chris Jaksa and Fieldin Culbreth also appeared in the film. Meals worked in Triple-A baseball (Triple-A Alliance and the International League) from 1990 to 1997 before receiving a full-time promotion to the major leagues. Meals spent the 2014 season as an interim crew chief while regular crew chief Gary Darling was on the Disabled List. Meals was officially promoted to permanent crew chief upon Darling's retirement.

== Notable games ==
In his first full-time MLB season, Meals was the home plate umpire when Kerry Wood tied a major league record with 20 strikeouts in a 1998 game. Meals was struck in the mask by a Wood fastball on his first pitch of the game, but was not injured.

In Game 2 of the 2010 American League Division Series between the Texas Rangers and Tampa Bay Rays, Meals was involved in a controversial call of a checked swing by Michael Young. Replays on television appeared to show that Young had gone around on his swing, but when asked for an appeal, Meals ruled that Young had held up, and Young's at bat stayed alive. One pitch later, Young hit a 3-run home run to put Texas ahead 5–0. The Rangers won the game 6–0, and won the series 3 games to 2, ending Tampa Bay's season. Rays manager Joe Maddon came out to argue the play and was ejected from the game.

On May 7, 2011, Meals worked behind the plate for Justin Verlander's second career no-hitter. The umpire's ball four call on J. P. Arencibia in the eighth inning prevented Verlander from achieving a perfect game. However, Verlander later said that he agreed with the call.

Meals and Major League Baseball both acknowledged that he missed a call in the 19th inning of a game between the Pittsburgh Pirates and the Atlanta Braves on July 26, 2011. During the play in question, a ground ball, Pirates catcher Michael McKenry received a throw and appeared to tag Braves runner Julio Lugo three feet in front of home plate but Meals called him safe and the Braves won the game. Meals received criticism for the call and the Pirates issued a public complaint. MLB executive vice president for baseball operations Joe Torre responded to the complaint and officially acknowledged that Meals' call was an error. However, other commentators have stated that the call was not obviously incorrect and that it may not have been overturned under MLB's current instant-replay rules.

Following the incident, Meals and his family received death threats at their home. Meals' wife reported that their children, who ranged between 14 and 23 at the time of the incident, were also "approached" by irate and confrontational fans, as Pittsburgh is only 70 miles away from the Meals' hometown of Salem, Ohio.

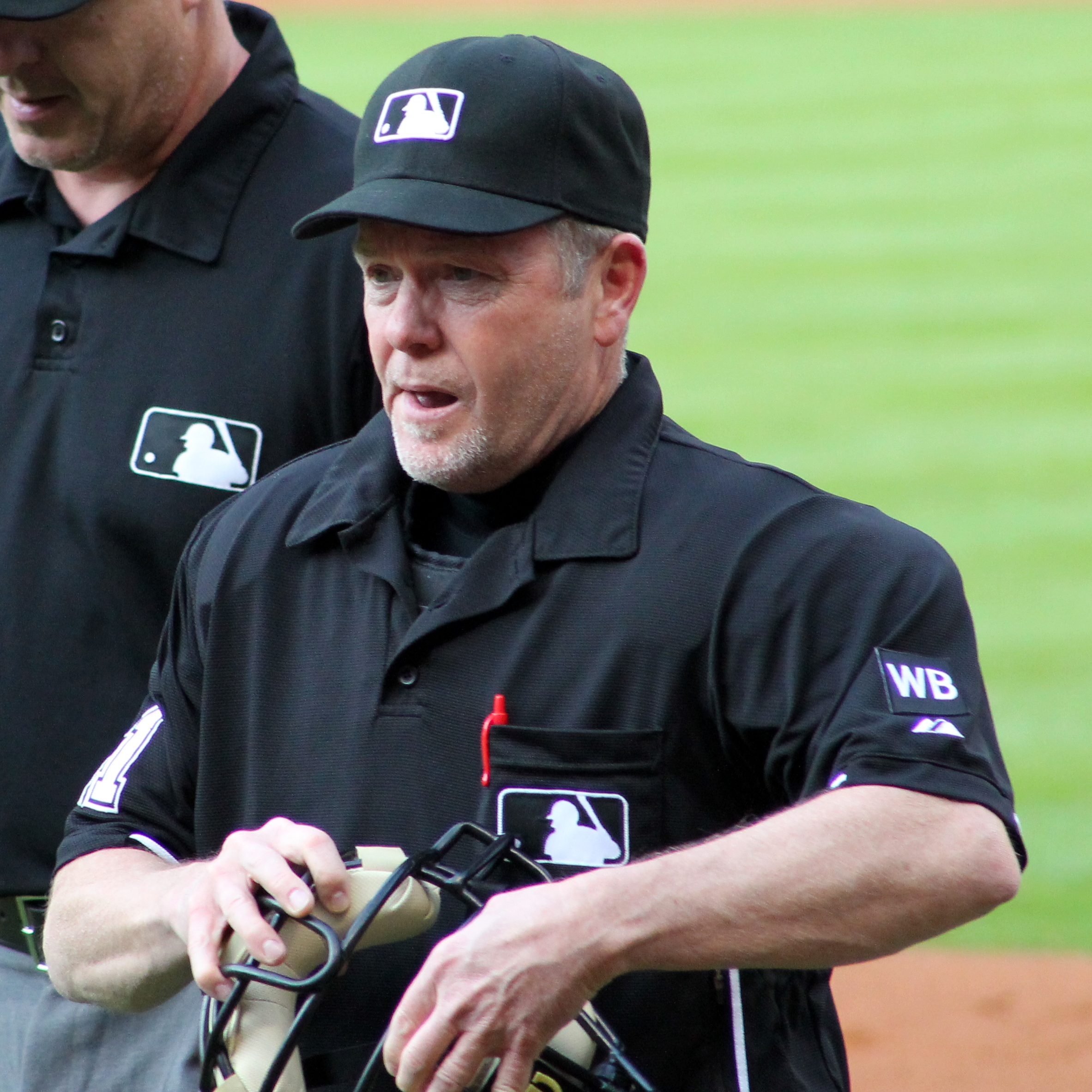
Meals in April 2014

On September 8, 2012, Meals incorrectly ruled Mark Teixeira of the New York Yankees out on a game-ending double play at first base against the Baltimore Orioles. If Meals had made the correct call, the game would have been tied, but instead the Orioles won and moved up a game to be even with the Yankees for first in the AL East.

On July 29, 2013, Meals incorrectly ruled Daniel Nava of the Boston Red Sox out at home plate in the 8th inning against the Tampa Bay Rays which would have tied the game. Instead, the Rays held on to win 2–1. Red Sox manager John Farrell was ejected for arguing the call, which Meals later admitted was incorrect.

On April 22, 2014, Meals was the home plate umpire when Albert Pujols of the Los Angeles Angels hit his 500th career home run against the Washington Nationals.

== Personal life ==
Meals lives in Perry Township, just outside Salem in Columbiana County, Ohio. He is married to Robyn Meals and has five children.

At 5'8" tall, Meals and Mark Wegner were the shortest umpires in Major League Baseball as of 2012.

== See also ==
- List of Major League Baseball umpires (disambiguation)
