= D. J. Carrasco =

American baseball player (born 1977)

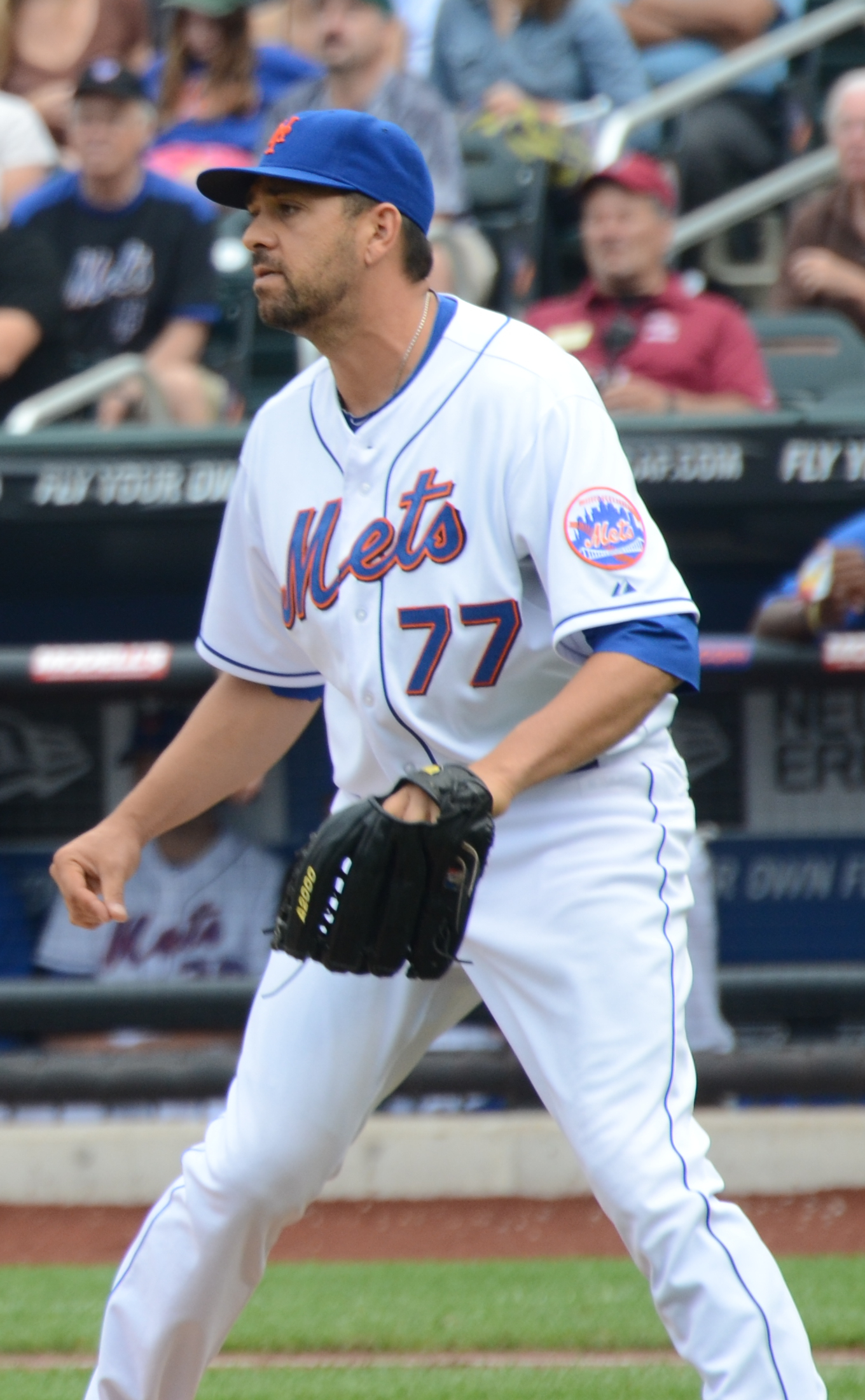
- Carrasco with the New York Mets
- Pitcher
- Born: April 12, 1977 (age 49); Safford, Arizona, U.S.
- Batted: Right Threw: Right

Professional debut
- MLB: April 2, 2003, for the Kansas City Royals
- NPB: March 29, 2006, for the Fukuoka SoftBank Hawks

Last appearance
- MLB: May 16, 2012, for the New York Mets
- NPB: May 11, 2006, for the Fukuoka SoftBank Hawks

MLB statistics
- Win–loss record: 24–21
- Earned run average: 4.50
- Strikeouts: 315

NPB statistics
- Win–loss record: 0-3
- Earned run average: 14.81
- Strikeouts: 9
- Stats at Baseball Reference

Teams
- Kansas City Royals (2003–2005); Fukuoka SoftBank Hawks (2006); Chicago White Sox (2008–2009); Pittsburgh Pirates (2010); Arizona Diamondbacks (2010); New York Mets (2011–2012)

Daniel J "D. J." Carrasco (born April 12, 1977) is an American former professional baseball pitcher. He most recently served as the pitching coach of the Syracuse Mets.

== Career ==
=== Baltimore Orioles ===
Carrasco was originally drafted by the Texas Rangers in the 39th round (1,074th overall) of the 1995 Major League Baseball draft, but did not sign. He was later drafted in the 26th round (795th overall) of the 1997 Major League Baseball draft by the Baltimore Orioles, but did not pitch a minor league game for them as he was released in 1998.

=== Cleveland Indians/Pittsburgh Pirates ===
After his release from the Orioles, Carrasco signed with the Cleveland Indians organization. He spent the 1998 season playing for the Single-A Watertown Indians of the New York–Penn League, and finished the season 1–1 with a 5.40 ERA in 13 games (one start). Carrasco later joined the Pittsburgh Pirates organization, and pitched in their farm system from 1999 through 2002.

=== Kansas City Royals ===
Carrasco was drafted by the Kansas City Royals from the Pirates in the 2002 Rule 5 draft. He made the Royals' Opening Day roster in 2003, and spent the entire season in the majors for the Royals, going 6–5 with a 4.82 ERA in 50 games (two starts). Carrasco split 2004 and 2005 between the Royals and their minor league affiliates. He saw more time in the starting rotation in 2005, posting a 6–8 record with a 4.79 ERA in 21 games (20 starts). On December 7, 2005, the Royals released Carrasco to allow him to pursue an opportunity to play in Japan.

=== Fukuoka SoftBank Hawks ===
Carrasco signed with the Fukuoka SoftBank Hawks of Nippon Professional Baseball prior to the 2006 season. He made only three starts with the team, posting an ERA of 14.81 with an 0–3 record.

=== Arizona Diamondbacks ===
On December 30, 2006, Carrasco signed with the Arizona Diamondbacks. He spent the season with their Triple-A affiliate, the Tucson Sidewinders, finishing the season 5–14 with a 6.68 ERA in 34 games (22 starts).

=== Chicago White Sox ===
On January 11, 2008, Carrasco signed a minor league contract that included an invitation to spring training with the Chicago White Sox.

On July 9, 2008, Carrasco was recalled by the White Sox to replace injured closer Bobby Jenks. Carrasco posted a 2.38 ERA in seven appearances with Triple-A Charlotte before being recalled. On August 3, 2008, during a game against the Kansas City Royals, Carrasco threw two pitches inside to Miguel Olivo, the second one hitting Olivo. Olivo came after Carrasco and started a bench-clearing brawl. On December 12, 2008, Carrasco was non-tendered by the White Sox, making him a free agent.

=== Pittsburgh Pirates ===
On January 16, 2010, Carrasco signed a minor league contract with the Pittsburgh Pirates with an invite to spring training. He had his contract selected to the major leagues on April 4.

=== Arizona Diamondbacks ===
On July 31, 2010, Carrasco, Bobby Crosby and Ryan Church were traded to the Arizona Diamondbacks for Chris Snyder and Pedro Ciriaco. On December 2, Carrasco was non-tendered and became a free agent.

=== New York Mets ===
On December 9, 2010, the New York Mets signed Carrasco to a two-year, $2.5 million contract. On June 11, 2011, he returned to the club as Dale Thayer was sent down. On June 16, 2011, in a game against the Atlanta Braves, Carrasco balked in the final run of the ball game in the 10th inning, giving the Braves a 9–8 victory. It was just the second balk off in the Mets history. On May 15, 2012, Carrasco was ejected by umpire Gary Darling following a hit batsmen. After surrendering a home run to Rickie Weeks of the Milwaukee Brewers, Carrasco drilled Ryan Braun with the next pitch and was thrown out. He was designated for assignment the following day. On May 25, 2012, he was released by the team.

=== Atlanta Braves ===
On June 19, 2012, Carrasco signed a minor league contract with the Atlanta Braves. He made his first appearance for the Triple A Gwinnett Braves on June 20. On July 3, he was released by Atlanta.

== Scouting report ==
Carrasco featured an 89–93 mile per hour four-seam fastball, a sinking two-seam fastball at 88–92 mph, a curveball and a changeup.

Unlike most pitchers, Carrasco, who typically threw with an overhand arm-slot, would occasionally drop down to a submarine arm-slot trying to catch the batter off guard.

== Personal life ==
Carrasco attended Hayward High School in Hayward, California.

== See also ==
- Rule 5 draft results
