= Bobby Crosby =

American baseball player & coach (born 1980)

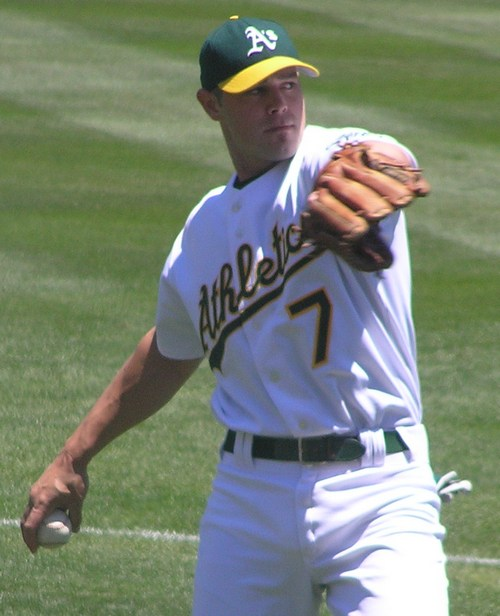
- Crosby with the Oakland Athletics

Athletics – No. 8
- Shortstop / Coach
- Born: January 12, 1980 (age 46); Lakewood, California, U.S.
- Batted: Right Threw: Right

MLB debut
- September 2, 2003, for the Oakland Athletics

Last MLB appearance
- August 21, 2010, for the Arizona Diamondbacks

MLB statistics
- Batting average: .236
- Home runs: 62
- Runs batted in: 276
- Stats at Baseball Reference

Teams
- As player: Oakland Athletics (2003–2009); Pittsburgh Pirates (2010); Arizona Diamondbacks (2010); As coach: Oakland Athletics / Athletics (2024–present)

Career highlights and awards
- AL Rookie of the Year (2004)

Robert Edward Crosby (born January 12, 1980) is an American former professional baseball infielder and current third base coach for the Athletics of Major League Baseball (MLB). He played in MLB for the Athletics, Pittsburgh Pirates, and Arizona Diamondbacks. The son of former major league infielder Ed Crosby, he batted and threw right-handed. He was Rookie of the Year in 2004.

== Early career ==
Crosby first attended Pacifica High School, then later graduated from La Quinta High School in Westminster, California.

In 1998, Bobby Crosby was selected by the Anaheim Angels in the 34th round of the Major League Baseball draft. Crosby chose not to sign with the Angels, however, opting instead to play college baseball for California State University, Long Beach.

In the 2001, Crosby was selected by the Oakland Athletics in the first round (25th pick) of the Major League Baseball draft.

== Professional career ==
=== Oakland Athletics ===
In 2004, his first full MLB season, he took over the Athletics' shortstop duties from 2002 American League Most Valuable Player Miguel Tejada, who signed with the Baltimore Orioles as a free agent. That year, Crosby hit .239 with 22 home runs and 64 RBIs. He also led American League rookies in hits (130), doubles (34) and walks (58). These numbers earned Crosby Rookie of the Year honors, the sixth Athletics player to do so after Harry Byrd (1952), José Canseco (1986), Mark McGwire (1987), Walt Weiss (1988), and Ben Grieve (1998).

In addition to becoming the sixth Athletics player to be named Rookie of the Year, he was the second shortstop in a row to win the award (after Ángel Berroa of the Kansas City Royals). He was also the eighth shortstop in 22 seasons to earn top rookie honors, the others being Cal Ripken Jr. (1982), Ozzie Guillén (1985), Walt Weiss (1988), Pat Listach (1992), Derek Jeter (1996), Nomar Garciaparra (1997), and Berroa (2003).

Crosby was just a vote shy of being a unanimous pick, despite his batting average being the lowest ever for a Rookie of the Year. He also struck out 141 times, fourth-most in the AL, and the team's most since Canseco had 152 in 1991.

Crosby and the Oakland Athletics agreed to a five-year, $12.75 million contract on April 22, 2005.

Due to the signing of free agent shortstop Orlando Cabrera prior to the 2009 season, Crosby was moved into a utility infielder role. However, with injuries to everyday second baseman Mark Ellis, third baseman Eric Chavez and infielder Nomar Garciaparra (another free agent signing), Crosby was expected to see significant starting roles at third base, as well as at second base.

=== Pittsburgh Pirates and Arizona Diamondbacks ===
The Pittsburgh Pirates signed Crosby as a free agent on December 9, 2009. He appeared in 61 games, with a batting average of .224. The Pirates traded Crosby, D. J. Carrasco and Ryan Church to the Arizona Diamondbacks for Chris Snyder and Pedro Ciriaco on July 31, 2010.

Crosby appeared in only nine games for the Diamondbacks, batting just .167, and was released on August 24, 2010.

=== Milwaukee Brewers ===
On January 22, 2013, Crosby signed a minor league deal with the Milwaukee Brewers, although after again hitting very poorly in Spring Training and not showing any improvement, the Brewers released him.

== Coaching career ==
Crosby served as a coach for the Midland RockHounds in 2019. Crosby was named the manager of the Stockton Ports for the 2020 season.

In 2022, Crosby served as the manager of the Mesa Solar Sox of the Arizona Fall League.

On November 5, 2025, following the hiring of Ryan Christenson, the Athletics announced that Crosby would be shifting to the role of third base coach.

== Personal life ==
His younger brother, Blake Crosby, played college baseball at Sacramento State. Blake was drafted by the Athletics in the 42nd round of the 2009 Major League Baseball draft and is currently serving as a Regional Crosschecker for the Toronto Blue Jays in Chandler, Arizona. Blake was the 2012 Al LaMacchia "Scout of the Year" award winner for the Toronto Blue Jays Organization.

== See also ==
- List of second-generation Major League Baseball players

Preceded by Kevin Youkilis	AL Rookie of the Month; June 2004	Succeeded by Robb Quinlan
Preceded by Ángel Berroa	Players Choice AL Most Outstanding Rookie; 2004	Succeeded by Huston Street
