= Daniel Moskos =

American baseball player and coach (born 1986)

Miami Marlins – No. 57
- Pitcher / Pitching coach
- Born: April 28, 1986 (age 40); Greenville, South Carolina, U.S.
- Batted: Right Threw: Left

MLB debut
- April 30, 2011, for the Pittsburgh Pirates

Last MLB appearance
- September 28, 2011, for the Pittsburgh Pirates

MLB statistics
- Win–loss record: 1–1
- Earned run average: 2.96
- Strikeouts: 11
- Stats at Baseball Reference

Teams
- As player: Pittsburgh Pirates (2011); As coach: Chicago Cubs (2022–2024); Miami Marlins (2025–present)

Daniel Ross Moskos (born April 28, 1986) is an American former professional baseball pitcher and current coach who serves as the pitching coach for the Miami Marlins of Major League Baseball (MLB). He played in MLB for the Pittsburgh Pirates in 2011. He has also served as a pitching coach for the Chicago Cubs.

== Amateur career ==
Daniel attended Damien High School in La Verne, California along with running back Ian Johnson, former NFL wide receiver Freddie Brown, and soccer forward Chukwudi Chijindu. After high school, he attended Clemson University and played college baseball for the Clemson Tigers. In 2005, he played collegiate summer baseball with the Cotuit Kettleers of the Cape Cod Baseball League.

== Professional career ==
=== Pittsburgh Pirates ===
The Pittsburgh Pirates selected Moskos with the fourth overall pick of the 2007 MLB draft. He signed with the Pirates for a $2.475 million signing bonus on July 17, 2007.

After placing pitcher Evan Meek on the 15-day disabled list with right shoulder tendinitis, the Pirates called Moskos up to the majors for the first time on April 30, 2011. On that same night, he made his Major League debut, pitching one scoreless inning in relief against the Colorado Rockies. On May 22, Moskos was optioned back to their Triple–A affiliate, the Indianapolis Indians. Less than a week later on May 28, Moskos was recalled to Pittsburgh due to Joe Beimel going on the 15-day disabled list with shoulder tightness. In 31 games in the majors, he was 1–1 with a 2.96 ERA and 11 strikeouts.

=== Chicago White Sox ===
On July 6, 2012, Moskos was claimed off waivers by the Chicago White Sox. He made 16 appearances down the stretch for the Triple-A Charlotte Knights, recording a 4.43 ERA with 21 strikeouts and 2 saves across 20 1/3 innings pitched.

Moskos made 22 appearances for Charlotte in 2013, compiling a 2-1 record and 4.97 ERA with 28 strikeouts over 29 innings of work. He was released by the White Sox organization on June 23, 2013.

=== EDA Rhinos ===
On July 23, 2013, Moskos signed with the EDA Rhinos of the Chinese Professional Baseball League. However, he did not appear in a game for the team.

=== Los Angeles Dodgers ===
On November 18, 2013, Moskos signed a minor league contract with the Los Angeles Dodgers, including an invitation to major league camp. Later he was assigned to the Triple–A Albuquerque Isotopes, where he had a 6.52 ERA in nine games before being released on May 7, 2014.

In 2015, while he was a free agent, Moskos was suspended for 50 games following a second positive test for a drug of abuse. Moskos played in the Mexican Professional Winter League in Navojoa, Sonora for Mayos de Navojoa. In 24 games, he posted a 2–1 record with nine saves.

=== San Diego Padres ===
On March 1, 2016, Moskos signed a minor league contract with the San Diego Padres organization. He made 53 appearances out of the bullpen for the Triple–A El Paso Chihuahuas, compiling a 5–2 record and 3.39 ERA with 47 strikeouts over 61 innings pitched. Moskos elected free agency following the season on November 7.

=== Lancaster Barnstormers ===
On December 20, 2016, Moskos signed a minor league contract with the Chicago Cubs.

On April 4, 2017, Moskos signed with the Lancaster Barnstormers of the Atlantic League of Professional Baseball. In 58 appearances out of the bullpen, he accumulated a 6-3 record and 3.27 ERA with 50 strikeouts across 52 1/3 innings pitched. Moskos became a free agent after the 2017 season.

=== Toros de Tijuana ===
On April 26, 2018, Moskos signed with the Toros de Tijuana of the Mexican League. In 44 appearances for Tijuana, he compiled a 4–1 record and 1.24 ERA with 43 strikeouts and 7 saves across 43 2/3 innings pitched.

On October 4, 2019, Moskos signed with the Olmecas de Tabasco of the Mexican League. However, he was released by the team on December 2.

== Post-playing career ==
=== New York Yankees organization ===
As of 2019, Moskos was working as a throwing trainer at Driveline Baseball. In 2021, Moskos was the pitching coach for the Single–A Charleston River Dogs of the New York Yankees organization. In 2021, Moskos served as the pitching coach for the Double–A Somerset Patriots.

=== Chicago Cubs ===
On November 15, 2021, the Chicago Cubs hired Moskos as their assistant pitching coach.

=== Miami Marlins ===
On November 27, 2024, the Miami Marlins hired Moskos to be the team's major league pitching coach.
