= Michael McKenry =

American baseball player (born 1985)

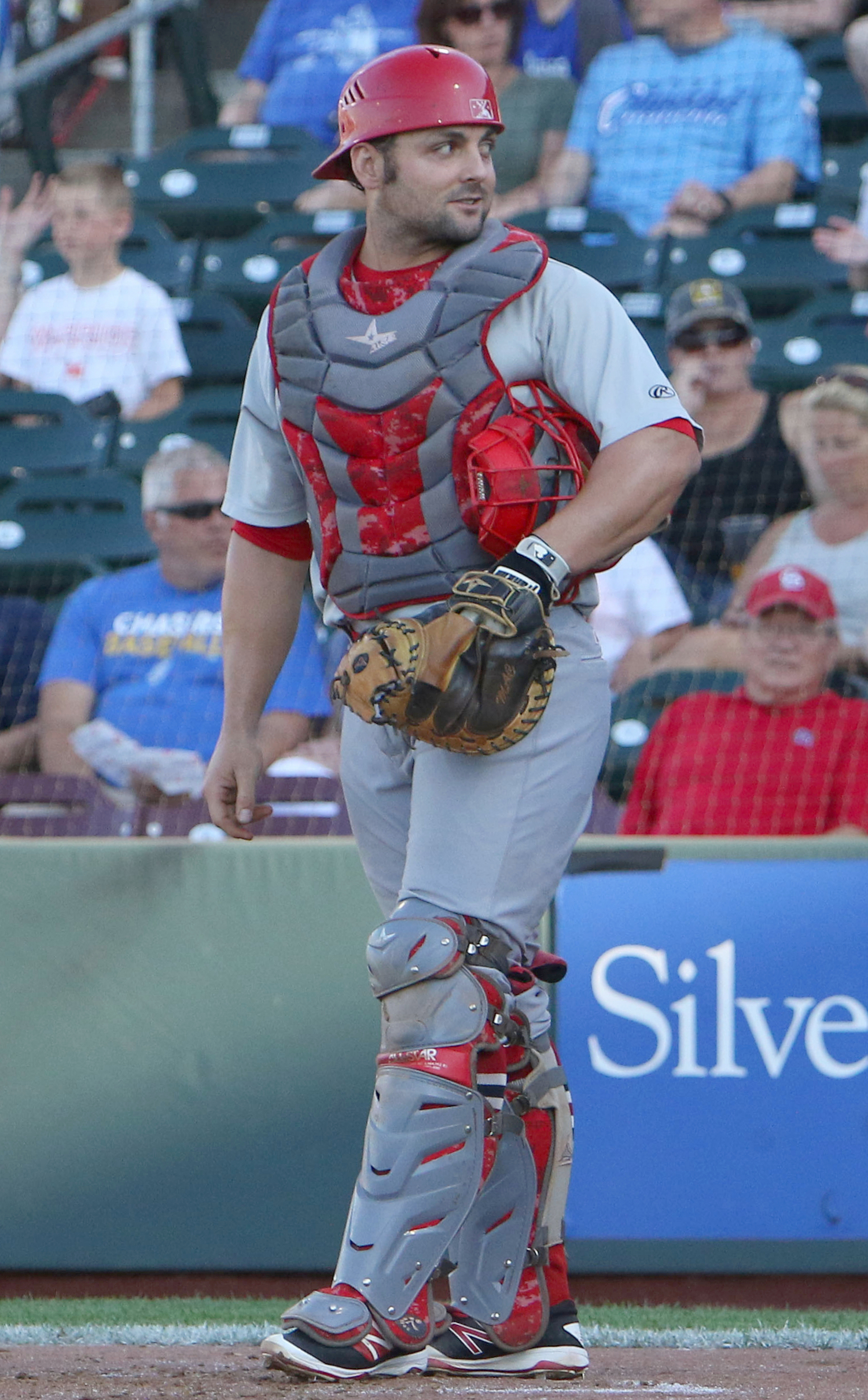
- McKenry with the Memphis Redbirds in 2016
- Catcher
- Born: March 4, 1985 (age 41); Knoxville, Tennessee, U.S.
- Batted: Right Threw: Right

MLB debut
- September 8, 2010, for the Colorado Rockies

Last MLB appearance
- July 18, 2016, for the St. Louis Cardinals

MLB statistics
- Batting average: .238
- Home runs: 29
- Runs batted in: 103
- Stats at Baseball Reference

Teams
- Colorado Rockies (2010); Pittsburgh Pirates (2011–2013); Colorado Rockies (2014–2015); St. Louis Cardinals (2016)

Michael Charles McKenry (born March 4, 1985), nicknamed "The Fort", is an American former professional baseball catcher. He played in Major League Baseball (MLB) for the Pittsburgh Pirates, Colorado Rockies, and St. Louis Cardinals.

== High school and college ==
McKenry attended Cedar Bluff Middle School, Farragut High School, and Middle Tennessee State University. In 2004, he played summer college baseball with the Bethesda Big Train of the Cal Ripken Collegiate Baseball League.

== International career ==
McKenry was originally named to the USA roster for the 2009 Baseball World Cup, but was injured and replaced by Lucas May before the tournament began.

== Professional career ==
=== Colorado Rockies ===
McKenry was drafted by the Colorado Rockies in the 7th round of the 2006 Major League Baseball draft. In 2006, he played for the Tri-City Dust Devils. In 2007, he played for the Asheville Tourists. In 2008, he played for the Modesto Nuts. In January 2009, Baseball America rated McKenry the #9 prospect in the Colorado Rockies organization. In 2009, he played for the Tulsa Drillers. In 2010, he played for the Colorado Springs Sky Sox, before being called up to the Rockies in September. McKenry made his major league debut on September 8, 2010, flying out against Cincinnati Reds pitcher Carlos Fisher in his only at bat. On March 29, 2011, McKenry was traded to the Boston Red Sox for minor league RHP Daniel Turpen.

=== Boston Red Sox ===
On March 29, 2011, McKenry was traded to the Boston Red Sox for minor league RHP Daniel Turpen. On June 13, 2011, he was traded to the Pittsburgh Pirates for cash or a player to be named later.

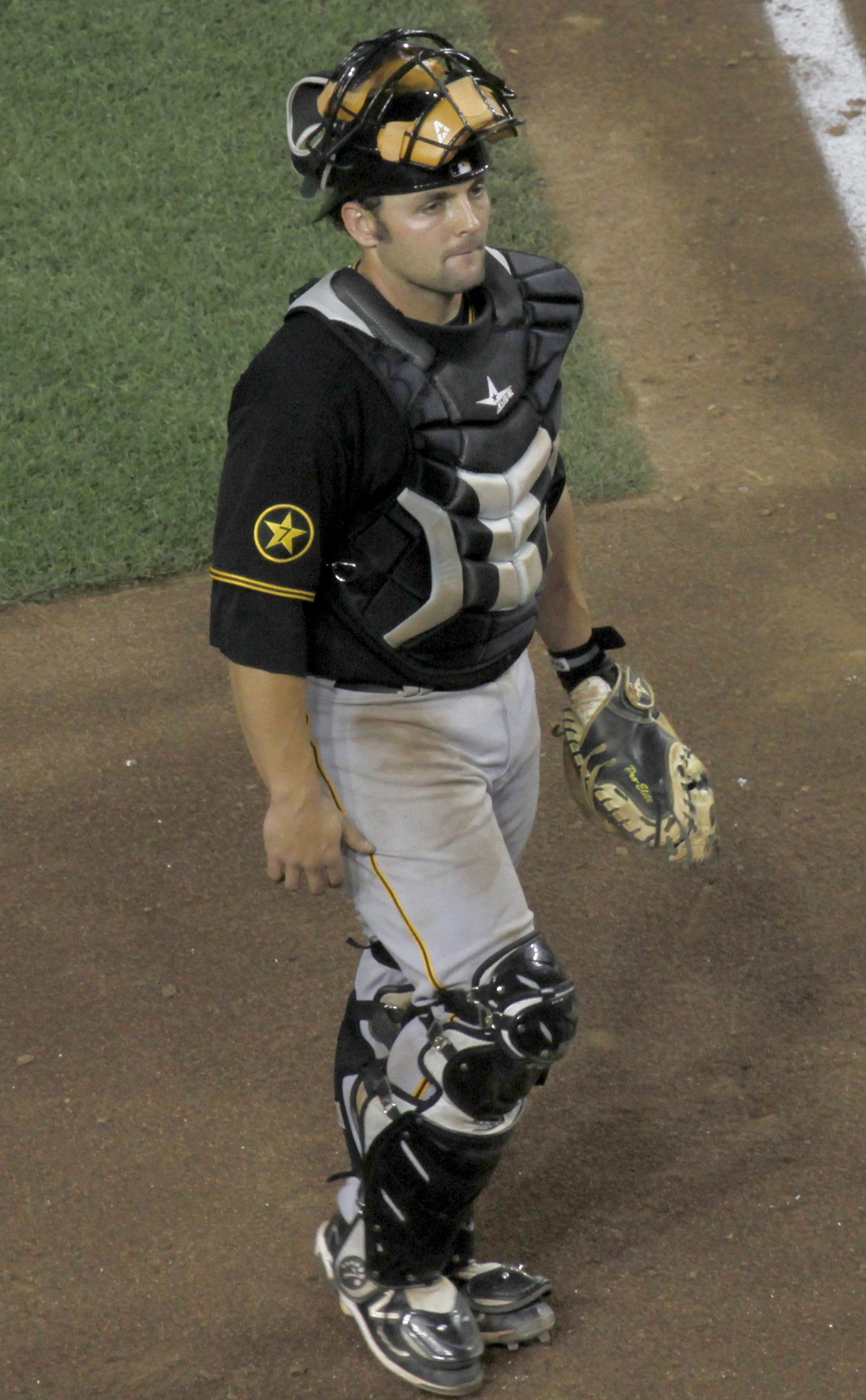
McKenry with the Pittsburgh Pirates in 2011

=== Pittsburgh Pirates ===
On June 13, 2011, he was traded to the Pittsburgh Pirates for cash or a player to be named later. McKenry made his debut for the Pirates on June 13 and recorded his first major league hit, a single off Houston Astros starter J. A. Happ, two days later. He hit his first major league home run on July 8, 2011 against the Chicago Cubs' Carlos Marmol.

On July 26, McKenry was involved in a controversial play against the Atlanta Braves in the bottom of the 19th inning. With runners on the corners, Scott Proctor hit a ground ball to Pedro Alvarez, who threw to McKenry, who appeared to tag Julio Lugo out at home. However, home plate umpire Jerry Meals called him safe, allowing Lugo to score the walk-off run.

McKenry has been given the nickname "Fort McKenry" or simply "The Fort" by fans and media in Pittsburgh due to his defensive skills behind the plate as the Pirates' catcher and the similarity of his name to Fort McHenry, the famous fort in Baltimore known for its role in the War of 1812.

On April 14, 2013 McKenry posted his first multi-homer game in the major leagues as he hit 2 home runs, rallying the Pirates to a 10-7 win over the Cincinnati Reds. On July 30, 2013, McKenry underwent knee surgery to repair a torn meniscus and was ruled out for the rest of the 2013 season.

On December 2, 2013, the Pirates acquired Chris Stewart from the New York Yankees, and designated McKenry for assignment. He was non-tendered by the Pirates later that day, becoming a free agent.

=== Colorado Rockies (second stint) ===
On January 16, 2014, McKenry signed a minor league contract with the Colorado Rockies. On March 20, the Rockies selected McKenry's contract after he made the Opening Day roster as Wilin Rosario's backup catcher. In 57 games for the Rockies, he batted .315/.398/.512 with eight home runs and 22 RBI.

McKenry played in 58 games for Colorado in 2015, slashing .205/.329/.402 with four home runs and 17 RBI. On October 14, 2024, McKenry was removed from the 40–man roster and sent outright to the Triple–A Albuquerque Isotopes; he subsequently rejected the assignment and elected free agency.

=== Texas Rangers ===
On December 30, 2015, McKenry signed a minor league contract with the Texas Rangers. He played in 13 games for the Triple–A Round Rock Express, slashing .220/.389/.342 with no home runs and nine RBI. On May 14, 2016, McKenry opted out of his contract and became a free agent.

=== St. Louis Cardinals ===
On May 27, 2016, McKenry signed a minor league contract with the St. Louis Cardinals. On July 7, the Cardinals selected McKenry's contract, adding him to their active roster. He logged two plate appearances for St. Louis before he was designated for assignment on July 19. He elected free agency on July 22.

=== Atlanta Braves ===
On July 22, 2016, McKenry signed a minor league contract with the Atlanta Braves. In 14 games for the Triple–A Gwinnett Braves, he batted .267/.365/.378 with one home run and three RBI.

=== Milwaukee Brewers ===
On August 15, 2016, McKenry was traded to the Milwaukee Brewers in exchange for an unknown return. In 14 games for the Triple–A Colorado Springs SkySox, he batted .250/.500/.406 with one home run and six RBI. McKenry elected free agency following the season on November 7.

=== Tampa Bay Rays ===
On December 16, 2016, McKenry signed a minor league contract with the Tampa Bay Rays. He spent the 2017 season with the Triple–A Durham Bulls, playing in 74 games and hitting .209/.338/.324 with 4 home runs and 25 RBI. McKenry elected free agency following the season on November 6.

== Post-playing career ==
On February 2, 2018, McKenry announced his retirement to join MTSU as the director of player development. On February 9, 2018, the Pittsburgh Pirates announced he would serve as a studio analyst on the team's pregame and postgame shows.

== Personal life ==
McKenry is the son of Cliff and Shelia McKenry. He married his wife, Jaclyn, in 2008.

In 2025, McKenry filed a lawsuit against a right wing media company, alleging they failed to repay a $15,000 startup loan and significantly misrepresented their online reach. The company described themselves as "an uncensored platform empowering (Second Amendment) creators to thrive without censorship. Cancel-proof and purpose-built, it champions freedom, community and revenue generation, standing against big tech’s attack on the firearm industry.” A review of 65 videos posted on the site revealed the videos had accumulated a total of 103 views.
