= Pedro Ciriaco =

Dominican baseball player (born 1985)

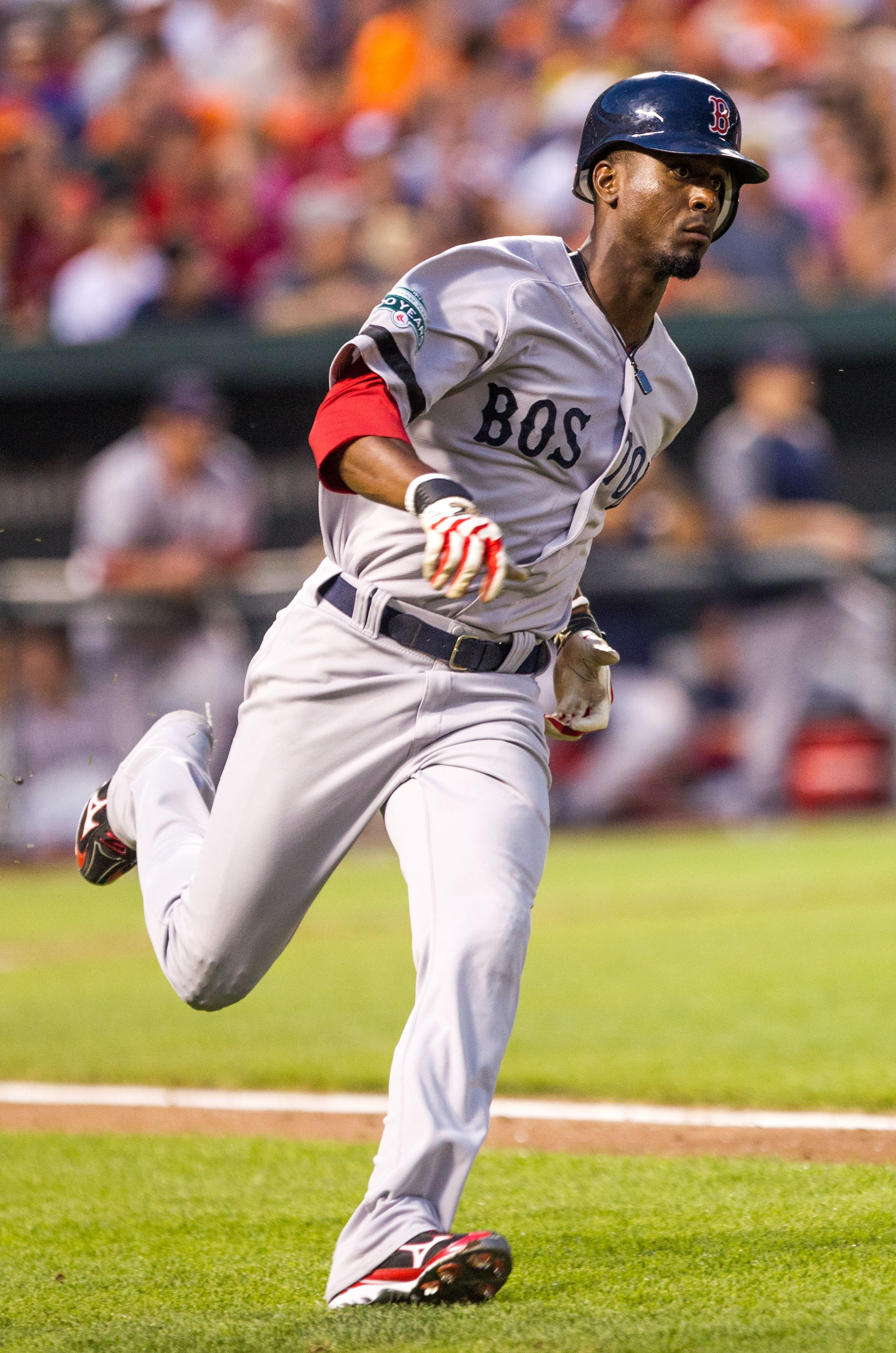
- Ciriaco with the Boston Red Sox
- Infielder
- Born: September 27, 1985 (age 40); San Pedro de Macoris, Dominican Republic
- Batted: Right Threw: Right

MLB debut
- September 8, 2010, for the Pittsburgh Pirates

Last MLB appearance
- October 4, 2015, for the Atlanta Braves

MLB statistics
- Batting average: .268
- Home runs: 5
- Runs batted in: 51
- Stolen bases: 35
- Stats at Baseball Reference

Teams
- Pittsburgh Pirates (2010–2011); Boston Red Sox (2012–2013); San Diego Padres (2013); Kansas City Royals (2013–2014); Atlanta Braves (2015)

Pedro Joel Ciriaco Leguisamon (born September 27, 1985) is a Dominican former professional baseball infielder. He played in Major League Baseball (MLB) primarily for the Pittsburgh Pirates, Boston Red Sox, San Diego Padres, Kansas City Royals, and Atlanta Braves and has also had brief stints in the Texas Rangers, Miami Marlins, and Detroit Tigers organizations. Ciriaco has primarily played shortstop and third base throughout his career, but has appeared at every position except for pitcher and catcher.

== Professional career ==
=== Arizona Diamondbacks ===
Ciriaco was signed by the Arizona Diamondbacks as an amateur free agent on February 28, 2003.

In 2005, Ciriaco played for the rookie-level, the Missoula Osprey. He then played for the Single-A South Bend Silver Hawks in 2006. Ciriaco spent the next two seasons with the High-A Visalia Oaks, gaining a promotion to Double-A Mobile Bay Bears in 2009. Ciriaco then began 2010 with Triple-A Reno Aces. At the beginning of the season, Baseball America ranked Ciriaco as the infielder with the best arm in the Diamondbacks' minor league system.

=== Pittsburgh Pirates ===
On July 30, 2010, Ciriaco and Chris Snyder were traded to the Pittsburgh Pirates in exchange for D. J. Carrasco, Ryan Church and Bobby Crosby. He was assigned to the Pirates' Triple-A affiliate, the Indianapolis Indians. Ciriaco was a late season call-up for the Pirates and made his major league debut on September 8. He hit an RBI double in his first Major League at-bat, off Cristhian Martínez of the Atlanta Braves. Ciriaco would play in eight games for Pittsburgh that season.

During the team's 2011 spring training, Ciriaco posted a .333 batting average while playing in a team-high 26 games. On March 27, 2011, he returned to Indianapolis after the Pirates named Rule 5 selection Josh Rodriguez to the team's Opening Day roster. The announcement came moments after Ciriaco and Rodriguez helped the Pirates defeat the Tampa Bay Rays by scoring on a throwing error in the bottom of the ninth inning to give the team a 5–4 victory.

In Indianapolis, Ciriaco played at second, third, shortstop and center field. He was non-tendered by the Pirates on December 12, after appearing in only 23 major league games in 2011.

=== Boston Red Sox ===
On January 3, 2012, the Boston Red Sox signed Ciriaco to a minor league contract. He attended spring training as a non-roster invitee, and led the Red Sox in batting average (.412), runs (14), hits (18), stolen bases (8), and games played (26), while collecting a .444 on-base percentage and a slugging of .651. He then was assigned to Triple-A Pawtucket. The Red Sox purchased his contract on July 6.

In 64 games with the Pawtucket Red Sox, Ciriaco hit for a .301 average, including four home runs and 21 RBIs.

The next day, Ciriaco made his Red Sox debut in the first game of a day-night doubleheader against the New York Yankees, getting the start at second. In the second game of the doubleheader, broadcasters Joe Buck and Tim McCarver named him the Player of the Game and praised Ciriaco for having a great glove at shortstop while providing some timely hits and speed on the basepaths. Ciriaco finished the game with four hits and 4 RBIs.

Also seeing time at second base and third, the three outfield positions and designated hitter, Ciriaco batted .293 with 16 stolen bases in 76 games for the Boston Red Sox in 2012. On June 10, 2013, Ciriaco was designated for assignment to make room for Will Middlebrooks.

=== San Diego Padres ===
On June 14, 2013, Ciriaco was traded from the Boston Red Sox to the San Diego Padres for a player to be named later. Ciriaco was acquired after second baseman Jedd Gyorko went on the disabled list with a groin strain, but he saw most of his action at shortstop, as Everth Cabrera went down with a hamstring injury soon after. He hit .238/.284/.333 with 6 SB and 4 RBI in 23 games with the Padres before being designated for assignment on July 12 when Gyorko returned.

=== Kansas City Royals ===
On July 16, 2013, Ciriaco was claimed off waivers by the Kansas City Royals. He was designated for assignment on April 5, 2014. He was eventually called back up to the roster and was again designated for assignment on June 30. On July 6, he was outrighted to the Omaha Storm Chasers. Ciriaco elected free agency on September 29.

=== Atlanta Braves ===
On October 13, 2014, Ciriaco signed a minor league contract with the Atlanta Braves organization. On May 2, 2015, Ciriaco was selected to the active roster. After hitting a double and a triple in two of his first three at-bats in 2015, Ciriaco briefly led the major leagues in wRC+.

=== Texas Rangers ===
On January 13, 2016, Ciriaco signed a minor league contract with the Texas Rangers organization that included an invitation to Spring Training. In 17 spring games, he had a batting average of .487 along with an on-base percentage of 1.013.

=== Miami Marlins ===
On July 8, 2016, Ciriaco was traded to the Miami Marlins in exchange for Eric Jokisch. In 23 games for the Triple–A New Orleans Zephyrs, he batted .221/.239/.250 with two home runs and four RBI. Ciriaco was released by the Marlins organization on August 12.

=== Detroit Tigers ===
On August 17, 2016, Ciriaco signed a minor league contract with the Detroit Tigers organization. In 14 games for the Triple–A Toledo Mud Hens, he hit .250/.241/.327 with no home runs and five RBI. Ciriaco elected free agency following the season on November 7.

=== Tigres de Quintana Roo ===
On May 5, 2017, Ciriaco signed with the Tigres de Quintana Roo of the Mexican League. In 46 appearances for Quintana Roo, he batted .267/.287/.361 with two home runs, 22 RBI, and four stolen bases. Ciriaco was released by the Tigres on July 6.

=== Vaqueros Unión Laguna ===
On July 11, 2017, Ciriaco signed with the Vaqueros Unión Laguna of the Mexican League. In 27 games for the team, he hit .287/.288/.320 with no home runs, nine RBI, and six stolen bases. Ciriaco was released by the Vaqueros on February 1, 2018.

=== Kagawa Olive Guyners ===
On April 28, 2018, Ciriaco signed a contract with the Kagawa Olive Guyners of the Shikoku Island League Plus.

== Awards and honors ==
- 2012 – Triple-A All-Star Game selection
- 2011 – Named the best defensive infielder in the Pittsburgh Pirates Minor League system by Baseball America
- 2010 – All-Star Futures Game selection
- 2009
  - Named by Baseball America as the best defensive shortstop in the Southern League
  - SOU Post-Season All-Star
  - SOU Mid-Season All-Star
- 2008
  - CAL Post-Season All-Star
  - CAL Mid-Season All-Star
- 2006 – MIDW Mid-Season All-Star

== Personal life ==
His younger brother, Audy, played in Minor League Baseball.
