= Chris Snyder =

American baseball player (born 1981)

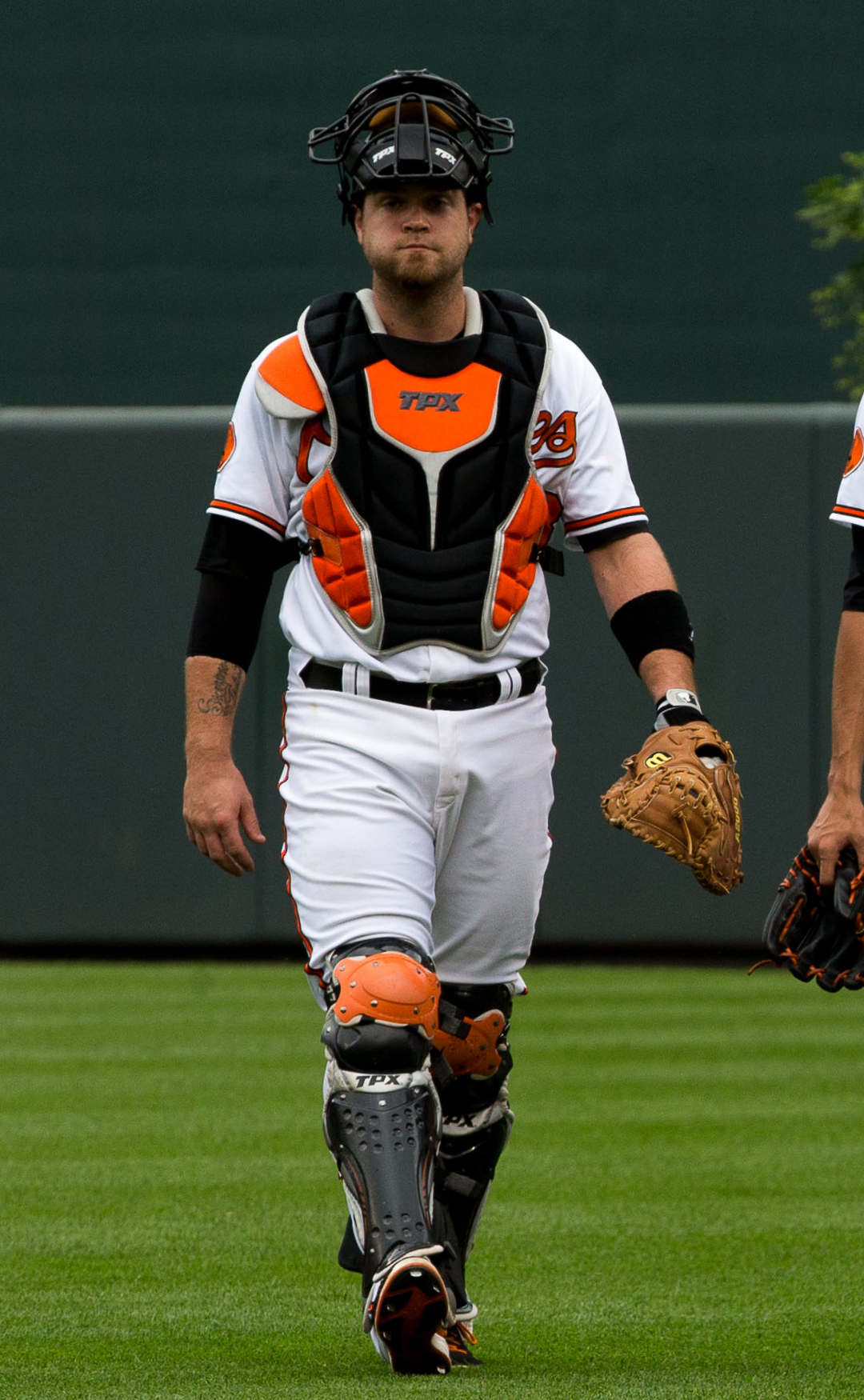
- Snyder with the Baltimore Orioles in 2013
- Catcher
- Born: February 12, 1981 (age 45); Houston, Texas, U.S.
- Batted: Right Threw: Right

MLB debut
- August 21, 2004, for the Arizona Diamondbacks

Last MLB appearance
- September 28, 2013, for the Baltimore Orioles

MLB statistics
- Batting average: .224
- Home runs: 77
- Runs batted in: 298
- Stats at Baseball Reference

Teams
- Arizona Diamondbacks (2004–2010); Pittsburgh Pirates (2010–2011); Houston Astros (2012); Baltimore Orioles (2013)

Christopher Ryan Snyder (born February 12, 1981) is an American former professional baseball catcher. He played in Major League Baseball (MLB) for the Arizona Diamondbacks, Pittsburgh Pirates, Houston Astros, and Baltimore Orioles. He bats and throws right-handed.

== High school and college ==
Snyder attended Spring Woods High School and the University of Houston. In 2001, Snyder started every game and hit .316; he also led the team in home runs, hits, doubles, RBIs, total bases, slugging percentage, on-base percentage, and hit by pitches. He was named All-Conference USA second team and also played for Team USA hitting 1 home run and having 9 RBIs. In 2002, he hit .348 with 15 home runs and 70 RBIs and was named to the All-Tournament Team in the Conference USA Tournament.

Snyder had been drafted by the Seattle Mariners in the 1999 Major League Baseball draft, but chose to attend college. He was drafted by the Arizona Diamondbacks in the 2nd round of the 2002 Major League Baseball draft.

== Career ==
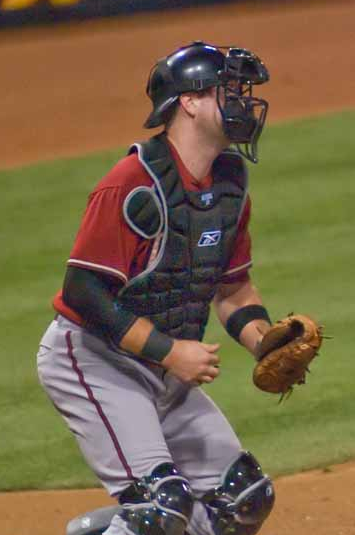
Snyder with the Arizona Diamondbacks in 2007

=== Arizona Diamondbacks ===
==== Minor leagues ====
Snyder began his professional career with the High-A Lancaster JetHawks and hit .258 with 9 home runs and 44 RBIs. He began 2003 with Lancaster again and was promoted to Double-A El Paso after hitting .314 with 10 home runs and 53 RBIs. He began 2004 with El Paso and hit .301 with 15 home runs and 57 RBIs and was promoted to the major league team.

==== Major leagues ====
Snyder was called up to the majors and made his debut on August 21, 2004. In his first game, he went 2–3 with a double. In only 96 at-bats in the majors in 2004, he hit 5 home runs. In 2005, he was the starting catcher, but struggled offensively as he hit only .202. He was strong defensively though, with a fielding percentage of .997. Before the 2006 season, the D-Backs traded for All-Star catcher Johnny Estrada from the Atlanta Braves, making Snyder the backup. In 61 games, Snyder hit .277 with a .995 fielding percentage and threw out 45% of would-be base stealers.

After the 2006 season, Estrada was traded to Milwaukee and Snyder shared time behind the plate with rookie Miguel Montero. In 2007, he hit .252 with a .999 fielding percentage and threw out 36% of would-be base stealers. In 2008, he set career highs in home runs (16) and RBIs (64) and also had a perfect fielding percentage of 1.000.

On December 30, 2008, Snyder and the D-Backs agreed on a three-year contract extension with an option for a fourth year.

Before the 2010 season Snyder was almost traded to the Blue Jays for former Diamondback Lyle Overbay but the Jays questioned Snyder's back problems and nixed the trade.

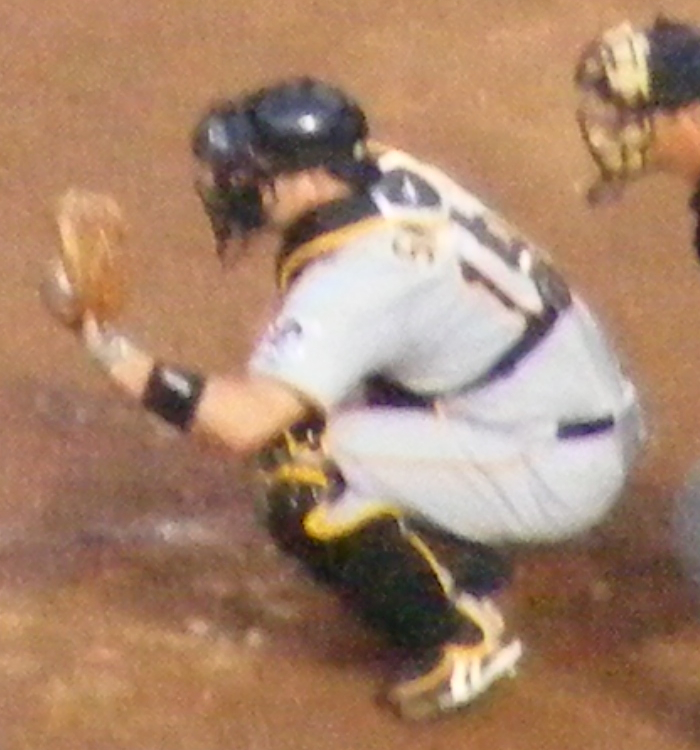
Snyder with the Pirates in 2011

=== Pittsburgh Pirates ===
On July 31, 2010, it was announced that Snyder and minor leaguer Pedro Ciriaco were traded to the Pittsburgh Pirates in exchange for D. J. Carrasco, Ryan Church and Bobby Crosby. He began the 2011 season with the Pirates' Single A affiliate, the Bradenton Marauders, on a rehab assignment for back pains he experienced during spring training. In two games with Bradenton, Snyder had gone 5-for-6 with seven RBI, two doubles and a home run.

=== Houston Astros ===
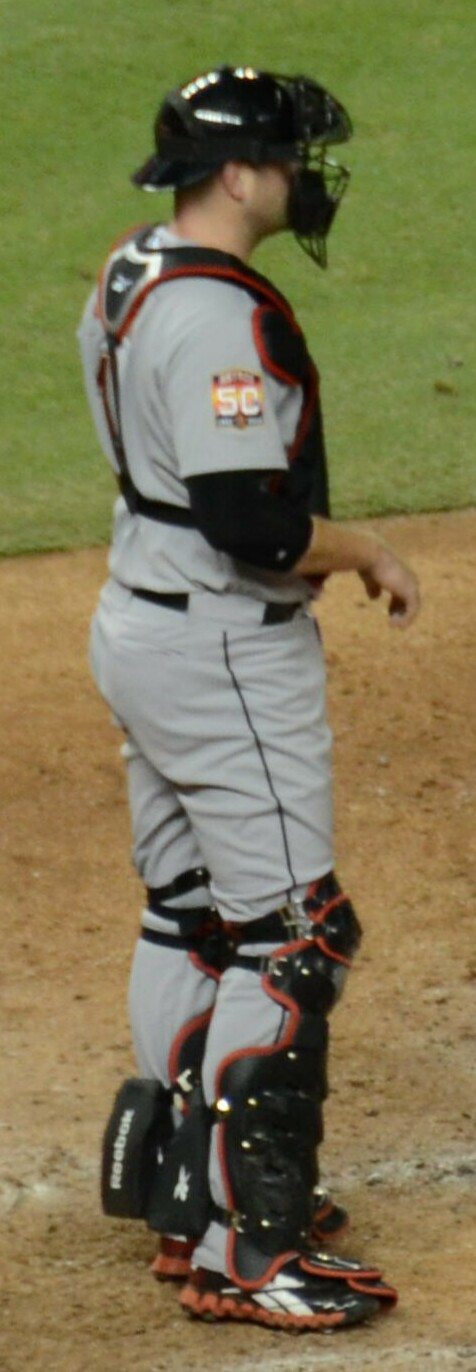
Snyder during his tenure with the Houston Astros in 2012

On January 24, 2012, Snyder signed a one-year, $750,000 contract with the Houston Astros. In 76 appearances for Houston, he batted .177/.295/.308 with seven home runs and 24 RBI. On October 31, the Astros declined Snyder's 2013 option, making him a free agent.

=== Los Angeles Angels of Anaheim ===
Snyder signed a minor league contract with the Washington Nationals on February 5, 2013. The Nationals released him prior to the start of the season on March 18.

On March 18, 2013, Snyder signed a minor league contract with the Los Angeles Angels of Anaheim that included an invitation to spring training. In 21 games for the Triple-A Salt Lake Bees, he slashed .342/.388/.684 with seven home runs and 21 RBI.

=== Baltimore Orioles ===
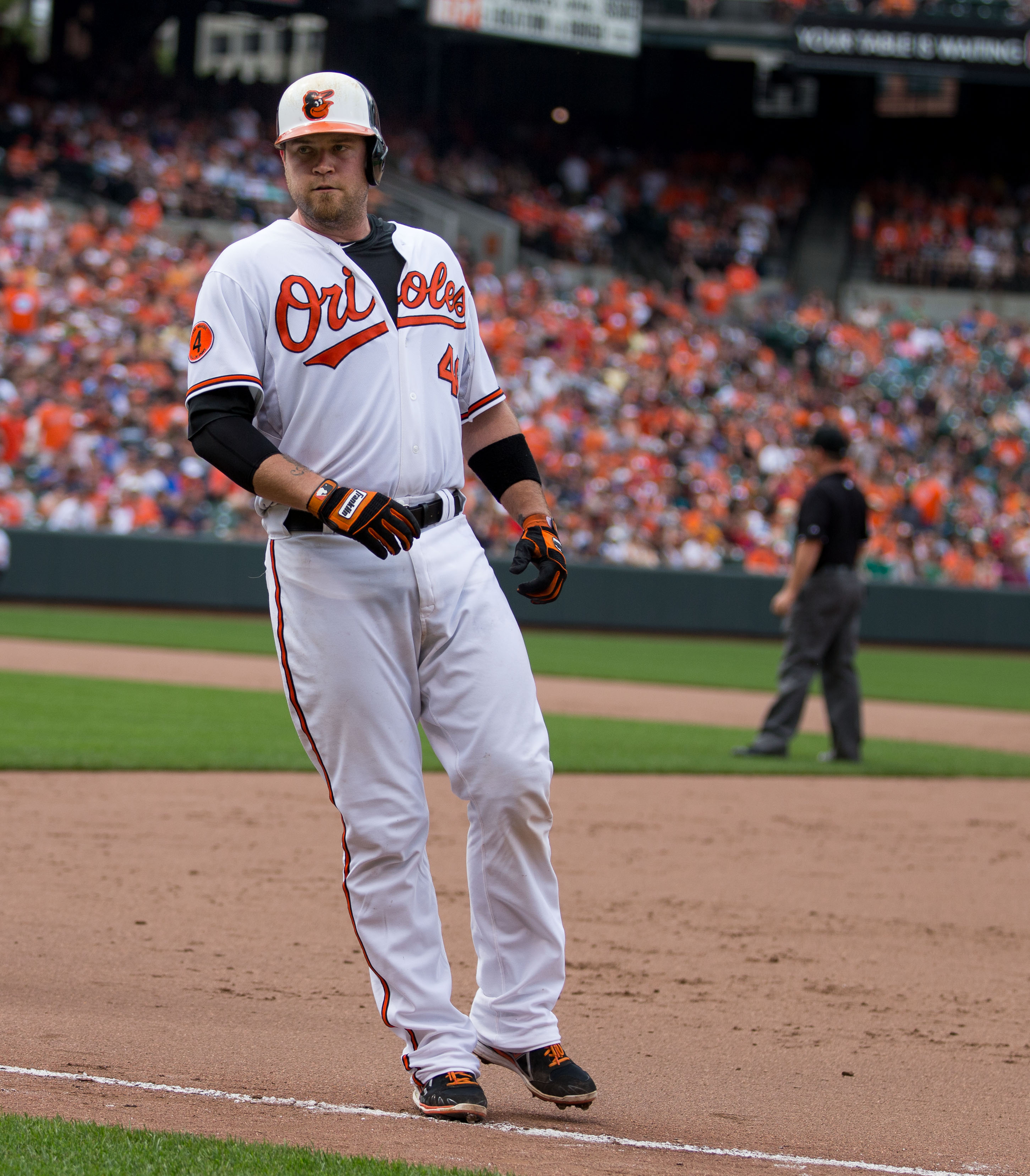
Snyder in 2013

On April 28, 2013, Snyder was traded to the Baltimore Orioles in exchange for minor league pitcher Rob Delaney. Snyder was designated for assignment by the Orioles on June 4, and sent outright to the Triple-A Norfolk Tides on June 8. On September 1, the Orioles selected Snyder's contract, adding him to their active roster. In 9 games for Baltimore, he went 2-for-20 (.100) with 1 RBI.

=== Texas Rangers ===
On December 21, 2013, Snyder signed a minor league contract with the Washington Nationals that included an invitation to spring training. He was released prior to the start of the season on March 24, 2014.

Snyder signed a minor league contract with the Texas Rangers on March 25, 2014. In 7 games for the Triple-A Round Rock Express, he went 5-for-21 (.238) with 2 RBI. Snyder retired from professional baseball on April 19.
