= Brandon Wood =

American baseball player (born 1985)

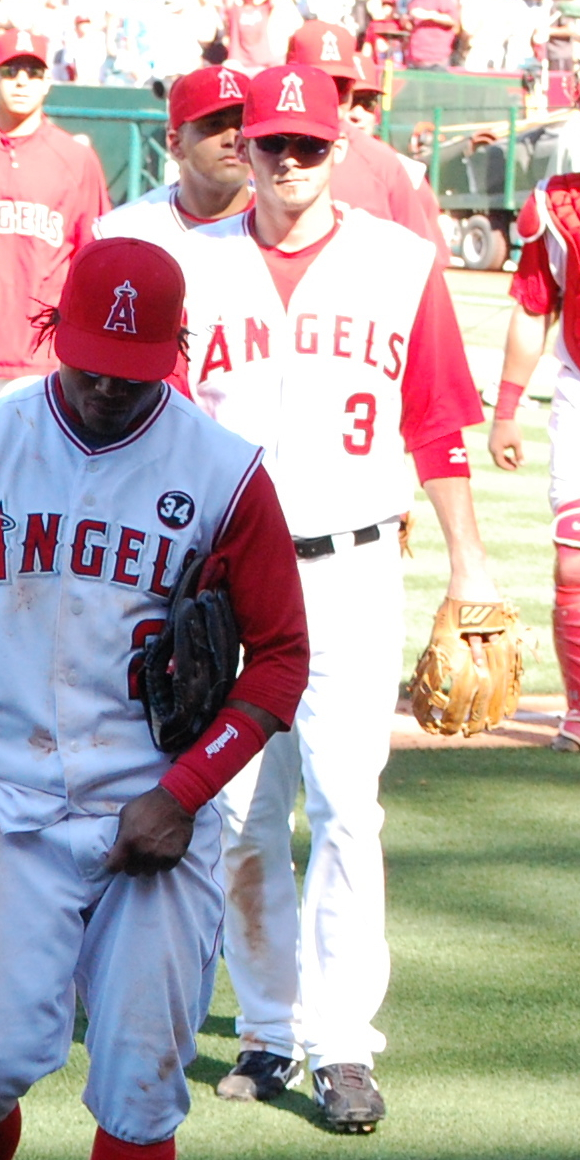
- Wood (#3) with the Angels
- Third baseman / Shortstop
- Born: March 2, 1985 (age 41); Austin, Texas, U.S.
- Batted: Right Threw: Right

MLB debut
- April 26, 2007, for the Los Angeles Angels of Anaheim

Last appearance
- September 25, 2011, for the Pittsburgh Pirates

MLB statistics
- Batting average: .186
- Home runs: 18
- Runs batted in: 64
- Stats at Baseball Reference

Teams
- Los Angeles Angels of Anaheim (2007–2011); Pittsburgh Pirates (2011)

Richard Brandon Wood (born March 2, 1985) is an American former professional baseball infielder and Minor League Baseball manager. He played for the Los Angeles Angels of Anaheim and Pittsburgh Pirates of Major League Baseball from 2007 through 2011. He managed the Tri-City Dust Devils of the Low-A Northwest League in 2016.

== Playing career ==
=== Los Angeles Angels of Anaheim ===
Wood was drafted by the Anaheim Angels in the first round (23rd overall) of the 2003 amateur draft.

He spent most of the 2005 season with the Angels' High-A Rancho Cucamonga Quakes, hitting .321 with a California League record 43 home runs and 51 doubles.

Wood received several awards for his performance in 2005. Amongst his accolades were: the Joe Bauman Home Run Award, the California League and Single-A Offensive Player of the Year awards, player of the year by Minor League Baseball's official website, and co-player of the year of the Angels minor league system, alongside fellow prospect Howie Kendrick.

Wood was selected by the Angels to play on their Arizona Fall League team, the Surprise Scorpions, in October and early November 2005. He hit a league-record 14 home runs for the league runner-up. In mid-November 2005, he represented the United States on the U.S. Olympic regional qualifying team.

Prior to the 2006 season, Wood was ranked as the 3rd best prospect by Baseball America, behind Delmon Young and Justin Upton. He had a solid, though not spectacular year, hitting .276 with 25 home runs and 19 stolen bases in 453 at-bats for the Double-A Arkansas Travelers.

Wood began 2007 as a top 10 prospect by Baseball America once more, holding the 8th spot overall. He changed positions however, as he slid over to third base for the other highly talented shortstop Erick Aybar. This move was made in part to accelerate his track to the majors.

Wood was called up to Angels' major league club on April 25, 2007, and made his major league debut at third base the following day against the Tampa Bay Devil Rays. Prior to the call-up to the big club, Wood was batting .278 (22-for-79) with three home runs and 15 RBIs in 20 games with Salt Lake. Wood's first major league at-bat came against Jae Seo. He struck out swinging. He started his second game at third base for the Halos on April 29, picking up his first career base hit off Chicago White Sox closer Bobby Jenks. After the game, he was optioned back to Triple-A Salt Lake. He was recalled to the Angels on May 2. On September 12, 2007, against the Baltimore Orioles, he hit his first major league home run off Danys Báez.

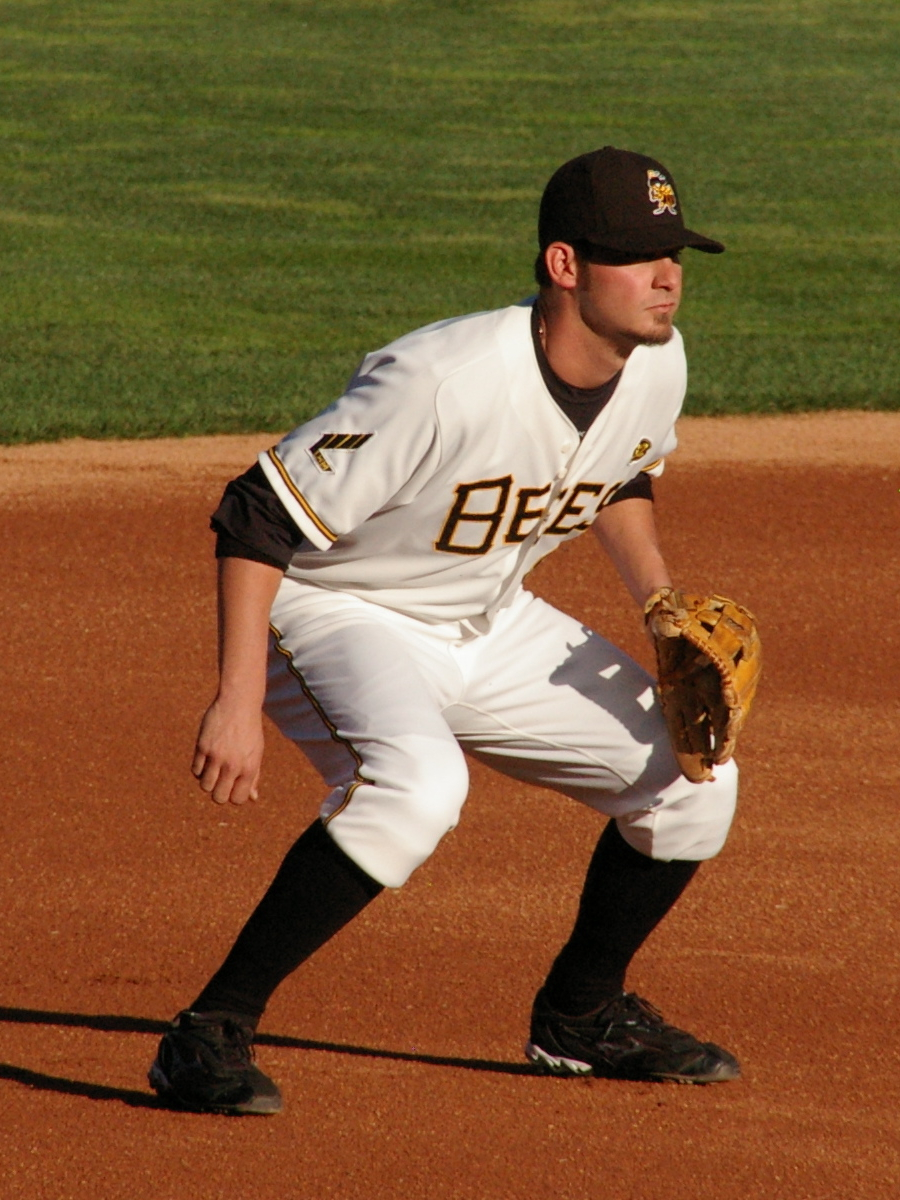
Wood playing for the Salt Lake Bees in 2009

In the 2009 offseason, third base appeared to open up for Wood as All-Star third baseman Chone Figgins signed a four-year deal with division rivals the Seattle Mariners. Wood went into Spring training, preparing for a shot at the majors. "I'm going in to spring training to win a job", he said, "That keeps you on your toes. If you think that job is yours, you might get lazy. I've got to be ready to work, rather than sitting back and saying I paid my dues, I waited for my time." He cited first baseman Kendrys Morales, who had just come off a breakout 2009 season, as a role model. The Angels' willingness to part with Figgins was in part because they had Wood waiting in Triple-A. Bill Shaikin reported, "The Angels also think that, as Wood improves his plate discipline and gains a better command of the strike zone, he will add a key power component to the lineup." Wood began the season in Triple-A, getting called up for a couple of games at the end of April before being sent down to Triple-A again. He hit .195 in just 18 games.

Wood headed into the 2010 season with low optimism but ultimately began the season as the starting third baseman for the Angels. On June 27, 2010, Wood hit his first Major League grand slam off Colorado Rockies reliever Manny Corpas. He finished the season with a .146 batting average, including four home runs, in 226 official at-bats.

On April 19, 2011, Wood was designated for assignment by the Angels to accommodate Erick Aybar's activation from the disabled list.

=== Pittsburgh Pirates ===
Wood was claimed off waivers by the Pittsburgh Pirates on April 22, 2011. In his April 25 debut for the Pirates, a home game against the Washington Nationals, Wood hit a two-run double and was part of a four-run fourth inning that gave the Pirates a 4–2 win. Wood played in a career high 99 games, hitting 7 home runs with 31 RBI, but struggled to make sufficient contact, managing just a .220 average.

=== Colorado Rockies ===
Wood signed a minor league contract with the Colorado Rockies on November 17, 2011. He spent nearly all the season with the Triple-A Colorado Springs Sky Sox, hitting 10 home runs with 64 RBI and a batting average of .259.

=== Kansas City Royals ===
On November 16, 2012, the Kansas City Royals confirmed they had signed Wood to a minor league contract. No financial terms of the deal were announced. Wood played in 17 games for the Triple-A Omaha Storm Chasers in 2013, batting .264/.304/.396 with two home runs and seven RBI.

=== Baltimore Orioles ===
On May 9, 2013, Wood was traded to the Baltimore Orioles in exchange for cash considerations. In 48 games for the Triple-A Norfolk Tides, he slashed .216/.250/.309 with two home runs and 23 RBI. Wood was released by the Orioles organization on July 26.

=== Sugar Land Skeeters ===
On December 26, 2013, Wood signed a minor league contract with the San Diego Padres organization. He was released prior to the start of the season on March 21, 2014.

Wood then played for the Sugar Land Skeeters of the Atlantic League of Professional Baseball, an independent baseball league. He batted .098 with one home run and five RBI in 25 games, and decided to retire.

== Personal life ==
In an interview with Baseball America in April 2021, Wood chronicled his mental health struggles while playing in 2010, suggesting that near-daily panic attacks undermined his ascent to a prosperous playing career in the big leagues. “I was just so light-headed. I couldn’t really breathe—I had this feeling of pure fear,” Wood said. “I have to have success here and I don’t know how I’m going to do it.” Wood chose to suffer in silence, worried that simply admitting he needed help with his mental state would be perceived poorly by manager Mike Scioscia and negatively impact his career far more than the daily panic attacks.

Following his retirement as a player in 2015, Wood was hired to manage the Tri-City Dust Devils, the Padres affiliate in the Low-A Northwest League for the 2016 season. After one season in a manager role, Wood retired from professional baseball and began a career in the private world. He currently owns and operates a D-BAT Baseball and Softball academy franchise in Billings, Montana, where he continues coaching baseball as a private instructor. Wood resides in Billings, Montana with his wife, Elly and their two young sons.
