= 2010 Pittsburgh Pirates season =

2010 Pittsburgh Pirates
- League: National League
- Division: Central
- Ballpark: PNC Park
- City: Pittsburgh, Pennsylvania
- Record: 57–105 (.352)
- Divisional place: 6th
- Owners: Bob Nutting
- General managers: Neal Huntington
- Managers: John Russell
- Television: FSN Pittsburgh
- Radio: WPGB-FM (Steve Blass, Greg Brown, Tim Neverett, Bob Walk, John Wehner)

The 2010 Pittsburgh Pirates season was the 129th season of the franchise; the 124th in the National League. This was their tenth season at PNC Park. The 2010 season was the Pirates' MLB-record 18th consecutive losing season. (This is also the longest for any major professional North American sport). The Pirates finished sixth and last in the National League Central with a record of 57–105, their worst record since 1952.

== Off-season ==
The Pirates used the off-season to pick up bullpen help, signing relievers Javier López, Brendan Donnelly and former closer Octavio Dotel to one-year contracts. They also added a shortstop, Bobby Crosby and re-signed shortstop Ronny Cedeño. The Pirates were intent on not having a losing season for the 18th straight year, though it happened.

== Regular season ==
=== Season standings ===
==== National League Central ====
NL Central
Team	W	L	Pct.	GB	Home	Road
Cincinnati Reds	91	71	.562	—	49‍–‍32	42‍–‍39
St. Louis Cardinals	86	76	.531	5	52‍–‍29	34‍–‍47
Milwaukee Brewers	77	85	.475	14	40‍–‍41	37‍–‍44
Houston Astros	76	86	.469	15	42‍–‍39	34‍–‍47
Chicago Cubs	75	87	.463	16	35‍–‍46	40‍–‍41
Pittsburgh Pirates	57	105	.352	34	40‍–‍41	17‍–‍64

==== National League Wild Card ====
Division leaders
Team	W	L	Pct.
Philadelphia Phillies	97	65	.599
San Francisco Giants	92	70	.568
Cincinnati Reds	91	71	.562

Wild Card team (Top team qualifies for postseason)
Team	W	L	Pct.	GB
Atlanta Braves	91	71	.562	—
San Diego Padres	90	72	.556	1
St. Louis Cardinals	86	76	.531	5
Colorado Rockies	83	79	.512	8
Florida Marlins	80	82	.494	11
Los Angeles Dodgers	80	82	.494	11
New York Mets	79	83	.488	12
Milwaukee Brewers	77	85	.475	14
Houston Astros	76	86	.469	15
Chicago Cubs	75	87	.463	16
Washington Nationals	69	93	.426	22
Arizona Diamondbacks	65	97	.401	26
Pittsburgh Pirates	57	105	.352	34

==== Record vs. opponents ====
2010 National League record Source: MLB Standings Grid – 2010
Team	AZ	ATL	CHC	CIN	COL	FLA	HOU	LAD	MIL	NYM	PHI	PIT	SD	SF	STL	WSH	AL
Arizona	–	3–4	1–6	2–5	9–9	3–3	4–3	5–13	3–4	5–1	2–4	2–4	8–10	5–13	4–5	3–4	6–9
Atlanta	4–3	–	4–2	3–2	2–4	11–7	5–1	5–3	5–2	11–7	8–10	6–3	4–2	4–3	2–6	8–10	9–6
Chicago	6–1	2–4	–	4–12	2–3	4–2	7–11	3–4	9–6	3–4	4–2	5–10	3–5	2–5	9–6	4–2	8–10
Cincinnati	5–2	2–3	12–4	–	2–5	5–2	10–5	5–4	11–3	4–2	2–5	10–6	2–4	3–4	6–12	4–3	8–7
Colorado	9–9	4–2	3–2	5–2	–	3–4	2–4	7–11	5–4	3–3	1–6	3–4	12–6	9–9	3–4	5–3	9–6
Florida	3–3	7–11	2–4	2–5	4–3	–	3–3	4–2	4–4	12–6	5–13	6–2	3–6	2–5	3–2	13–5	7–8
Houston	3–4	1–5	11–7	5–10	4–2	3–3	–	2–4	8–7	3–4	4–3	11–4	2–5	2–7	10–5	4–4	3–12
Los Angeles	13–5	3–5	4–3	4–5	11–7	2–4	4–2	–	4–2	3–4	2–4	4–3	8–10	8–10	3–4	3–3	4–11
Milwaukee	4–3	2–5	6–9	3–11	4–5	4–4	7–8	2–4	–	5–2	1–5	13–5	3–4	2–5	8–7	4–2	9–6
New York	1–5	7–11	4–3	2–4	3–3	6–12	4–3	4–3	2–5	–	9–9	6–1	3–3	3–4	3–3	9–9	13–5
Philadelphia	4–2	10–8	2–4	5–2	6–1	13–5	3–4	4–2	5–1	9–9	–	2–4	5–2	3–3	4–4	12–6	10–8
Pittsburgh	4–2	3–6	10–5	6–10	4–3	2–6	4–11	3–4	5–13	1–6	4–2	–	0–6	2–4	6–9	1–5	2–13
San Diego	10–8	2–4	5–3	4–2	6–12	6–3	5–2	10–8	4–3	3–3	2–5	6–0	–	12–6	3–4	3–3	9–6
San Francisco	13–5	3–4	5–2	4–3	9–9	5–2	7–2	10–8	5–2	4–3	3–3	4–2	6–12	–	3–3	4–2	7–8
St. Louis	5–4	6–2	6–9	12–6	4–3	2–3	5–10	4–3	7–8	3–3	4–4	9–6	4–3	3–3	–	3–3	9–6
Washington	4–3	10–8	2–4	3–4	3–5	5–13	4–4	3–3	2–4	9–9	6–12	5–1	3–3	2–4	3–3	–	5–13

=== Roster ===
2010 Pittsburgh Pirates
**Roster**
**Pitchers**: 50 Brian Bass; 71 Brian Burres; 77 D. J. Carrasco; 53 Brendan Donnelly; 29 Octavio Dotel; 57 Zach Duke; 59 Dana Eveland; 43 Sean Gallagher; 52 Joel Hanrahan; 58 Steven Jackson; 39 Chris Jakubauskas; 27 Jeff Karstens; 36 Wil Ledezma; 38 Chris Leroux; 32 Brad Lincoln; 48 Javier López; 28 Paul Maholm; 48 Joe Martinez; 34 Daniel McCutchen; 53 James McDonald; 47 Evan Meek; 37 Charlie Morton; 49 Ross Ohlendorf; 61 Chan Ho Park; 62 Hayden Penn; 30 Chris Resop; 43 Jack Taschner; 65 Justin Thomas	**Catchers**: 41 Ryan Doumit; 35 Jason Jaramillo; 38 Erik Kratz; 19 Chris Snyder; **Infielders**: 17 Pedro Alvarez; 13 Ronny Cedeño; 16 Pedro Ciriaco; 6 Jeff Clement; 2 Bobby Crosby; 73 Argenis Díaz; 3 Akinori Iwamura; 46 Garrett Jones; 15 Andy LaRoche; 51 Steven Pearce; 18 Neil Walker; **Outfielders**: 23 John Bowker; 19 Ryan Church; 22 Andrew McCutchen; 85 Lastings Milledge; 44 Brandon Moss; 75 Alex Presley; 58 John Raynor; 31 José Tábata; 24 Delwyn Young	**Manager**: 7 John Russell; **Coaches**: 86 Heberto Andrade (bullpen catcher); 55 Jeff Banister (bench); 10 Tony Beasley (third base); 60 Luis Dorante (bullpen); 12 Carlos García (first base); 39 Joe Kerrigan (pitching); 5 Don Long (hitting); 54 Ray Searage (pitching); 14 Gary Varsho (bench)

=== Opening Day lineup ===
Opening Day Starters
Name	Position
Akinori Iwamura	2B
Andrew McCutchen	CF
Garrett Jones	RF
Ryan Doumit	C
Lastings Milledge	LF
Jeff Clement	1B
Andy LaRoche	3B
Zach Duke	SP
Ronny Cedeño	SS

=== 2010 Results ===
==== Game log ====
2010 Game Log (57–105)
April (10–13)

#	Date	Opponent	Score	Win	Loss	Save	Attendance	Record
1	April 5	Dodgers	11–5	**Duke** (1–0)	Padilla (0–1)	—	39,024	1–0
2	April 7	Dodgers	4–3 (10)	**Donnelly** (1–0)	Ortiz (0–1)	—	31,061	2–0
3	April 8	Dodgers	2–10	Billingsley (1–0)	**Maholm** (0–1)	—	9,352	2–1
4	April 9	@ Diamondbacks	1–9	Lopez (1–0)	**Morton** (0–1)	—	21,316	2–2
5	April 10	@ Diamondbacks	6–3	**Duke** (2–0)	Haren (1–1)	**Dotel** (1)	22,407	3–2
6	April 11	@ Diamondbacks	6–15	Jackson (1–1)	**McCutchen** (0–1)	—	21,061	3–3
7	April 12	@ Giants	3–9	Zito (2–0)	**Burres** (0–1)	—	26,011	3–4
8	April 13	@ Giants	6–5	**Meek** (1–0)	Affeldt (2–1)	**Dotel** (2)	28,030	4–4
9	April 14	@ Giants	0–6	Sanchez (1–0)	**Morton** (0–2)	—	29,028	4–5
10	April 16	Reds	4–3	**Dotel** (1–0)	Masset (2–1)	—	14,758	5–5
11	April 17	Reds	5–4	**Taschner** (1–0)	Cordero (1–1)	—	25,196	6–5
12	April 18	Reds	5–3	**Maholm** (1–1)	Arroyo (0–1)	**Dotel** (3)	13,860	7–5
13	April 20	Brewers	1–8	Bush (1–0)	**Morton** (0–3)	—	9,386	7–6
14	April 21	Brewers	0–8	Gallardo (1–2)	**Duke** (2–1)	—	12,192	7–7
15	April 22	Brewers	0–20	Wolf (2–1)	**McCutchen** (0–2)	—	13,634	7–8
16	April 23	@ Astros	3–4	Oswalt (2–2)	**Maholm** (1–2)	Lindstrom (5)	30,018	7–9
17	April 24	@ Astros	2–5	Rodriguez (1–2)	**Jakubauskas** (0–1)	Lindstrom (6)	30,562	7–10
18	April 25	@ Astros	3–10	Myers (1–1)	**Morton** (0–4)	—	27,210	7–11
19	April 26	@ Brewers	3–17	Gallardo (2–2)	**Duke** (2–2)	—	25,892	7–12
20	April 27	@ Brewers	7–3	**Donnelly** (2–0)	Hoffman (1–2)	—	28,991	8–12
21	April 28	@ Brewers	6–5 (14)	**Carrasco** (1–0)	Parra (0–1)	—	28,401	9–12
22	April 29	@ Dodgers	2–0	**Burres** (1–1)	Kershaw (1–1)	**Meek** (1)	40,185	10–12
23	April 30	@ Dodgers	2–6	Billingsley (2–1)	**Morton** (0–5)	—	46,775	10–13

May (11–18)

#	Date	Opponent	Score	Win	Loss	Save	Attendance	Record
24	May 1	@ Dodgers	1–5	Ortiz (1–1)	**Duke** (2–3)	—	40,483	10–14
25	May 2	@ Dodgers	3–9	Kuroda (3–1)	**Karstens** (0–1)	—	39,339	10–15
26	May 4	Cubs	3–2	**Maholm** (2–2)	Dempster (2–2)	**Dotel** (4)	10,972	11–15
27	May 5	Cubs	4–2	**Morton** (1–5)	Lilly (1–2)	**Dotel** (5)	11,053	12–15
28	May 6	Cubs	11–1	**Burres** (2–1)	Wells (3–1)	—	11,085	13–15
29	May 7	Cardinals	3–4	Franklin (2–0)	**Meek** (1–1)	—	16,473	13–16
30	May 8	Cardinals	2–0	**Karstens** (1–1)	Garcia (3–2)	**Dotel** (6)	25,047	14–16
31	May 9	Cardinals	4–11	Wainwright (5–1)	**Maholm** (2–3)	—	17,342	14–17
32	May 10	Reds	1–2	Arroyo (2–2)	**Ohlendorf** (0–1)	Cordero (11)	9,045	14–18
33	May 11	Reds	0–9	Cueto (2–1)	**Morton** (1–6)	—	9,027	14–19
34	May 12	Reds	0–5	Bailey (1–2)	**Duke** (2–4)	—	20,064	14–20
35	May 14	@ Cubs	10–6	**Meek** (2–1)	Zambrano (1–3)	—	39,082	15–20
36	May 15	@ Cubs	4–3	**Maholm** (3–3)	Dempster (2–4)	**Dotel** (7)	41,336	16–20
37	May 16	@ Cubs	3–4	Marshall (2–1)	**Carrasco** (1–1)	Marmol (6)	40,636	16–21
38	May 17	@ Phillies	2–12	Kendrick (2–1)	**Morton** (1–7)	—	45,371	16–22
39	May 18	@ Phillies	2–1	**Duke** (3–4)	Halladay (6–2)	**Dotel** (8)	45,007	17–22
40	May 19	Brewers	6–4	**Lopez** (1–0)	Wolf (3–4)	**Dotel** (9)	9,526	18–22
41	May 20	Brewers	3–4	Narveson (4–1)	**Maholm** (3–4)	Villanueva (1)	13,975	18–23
42	May 21	Braves	0–7	Hudson (5–1)	**Ohlendorf** (0–2)	—	22,470	18–24
43	May 22	Braves	2–4	Lowe (6–4)	**Morton** (1–8)	Wagner (5)	26,519	18–25
44	May 23	Braves	3–2 (10)	**Dotel** (2–0)	Saito (0–2)	—	23,045	19–25
45	May 24	@ Reds	5–7	Harang (3–5)	**Burres** (2–2)	Cordero (15)	13,385	19–26
46	May 25	@ Reds	2–1	**Hanrahan** (1–0)	Masset (3–3)	**Dotel** (10)	14,471	20–26
47	May 26	@ Reds	0–4	Arroyo (5–2)	**Ohlendorf** (0–3)	—	18,137	20–27
48	May 27	@ Reds	2–8	Cueto (5–1)	**Morton** (1–9)	—	16,834	20–28
49	May 28	@ Braves	3–7	Lowe (7–4)	**Duke** (3–5)	—	23,442	20–29
50	May 29	@ Braves	3–6	Medlen (2–1)	**Burres** (2–3)	Wagner (6)	29,132	20–30
51	May 30	@ Braves	2–5	Saito (1–2)	**Hanrahan** (1–1)	Wagner (7)	31,078	20–31
52	May 31	Cubs	2–1	**Meek** (3–1)	Marshall (5–2)	**Dotel** (11)	20,235	21–31

June (6–20)

#	Date	Opponent	Score	Win	Loss	Save	Attendance	Record
53	June 1	Cubs	3–2	**Hanrahan** (2–1)	Lilly (1–5)	**Dotel** (12)	11,334	22–31
54	June 4	Giants	4–6	Sanchez (4–4)	**Duke** (3–6)	Wilson (14)	17,817	22–32
55	June 5	Giants	6–3	**Maholm** (4–4)	Wellemeyer (3–5)	—	36,687	23–32
56	June 6	Giants	5–6 (10)	Wilson (2–0)	**Dotel** (2–1)	Casilla (1)	24,068	23–33
57	June 7	Cubs	1–6	Silva (8–0)	**Eveland** (0–1)	Marshall (1)	12,768	23–34
58	June 8	@ Nationals	2–5	Strasburg (1–0)	**Karstens** (1–2)	Capps (19)	40,315	23–35
59	June 9	@ Nationals	5–7	Storen (2–0)	**Carrasco** (1–2)	Capps (20)	18,876	23–36
60	June 10	@ Nationals	2–4	Hernandez (5–3)	**Duke** (3–7)	Clippard (1)	21,767	23–37
61	June 11	@ Tigers	2–6	Verlander (7–4)	**Ohlendorf** (0–4)	—	33,236	23–38
62	June 12	@ Tigers	3–4 (10)	Coke (4–0)	**Donnelly** (2–1)	—	34,501	23–39
63	June 13	@ Tigers	3–4	Thomas (4–0)	**Lopez** (1–1)	Valverde (13)	31,243	23–40
64	June 15	White Sox	4–6	Garcia (7–3)	**Lincoln** (0–1)	Jenks (12)	12,693	23–41
65	June 16	White Sox	2–7	Danks (6–5)	**Duke** (3–8)	—	15,218	23–42
66	June 17	White Sox	4–5	Buehrle (5–6)	**Ohlendorf** (0–5)	Jenks (13)	23,170	23–43
67	June 18	Indians	3–4	Hernandez (6–5)	**Maholm** (4–5)	Wood (5)	28,478	23–44
68	June 19	Indians	6–4	**Karstens** (2–2)	Huff (2–9)	**Dotel** (13)	38,008	24–44
69	June 20	Indians	5–3	**Donnelly** (3–1)	Lewis (2–2)	**Dotel** (14)	29,845	25–44
70	June 22	@ Rangers	3–6	Hunter (3–0)	**Ohlendorf** (0–6)	Feliz (20)	23,083	25–45
71	June 23	@ Rangers	3–13	Ogando (3–0)	**Maholm** (4–6)	Harrison (1)	33,646	25–46
72	June 24	@ Rangers	5–6	Francisco (6–3)	**Jackson** (0–1)	—	19,567	25–47
73	June 25	@ Athletics	4–14	Sheets (3–7)	**Lincoln** (0–2)	—	11,154	25–48
74	June 26	@ Athletics	0–5	Cahill (7–2)	**McCutchen** (0–3)	—	25,068	25–49
75	June 27	@ Athletics	2–3	Breslow (3–1)	**Meek** (3–2)	Bailey (14)	15,238	25–50
76	June 28	@ Cubs	2–1	**Maholm** (5–6)	Cashner (0–2)	**Dotel** (15)	38,512	26–50
77	June 29	@ Cubs	1–3	Lilly (3–6)	**Karstens** (2–3)	Marmol (14)	36,914	26–51
78	June 30	@ Cubs	2–0	**Lincoln** (1–2)	Cashner (0–3)	**Dotel** (16)	37,391	27–51

July (9–16)

#	Date	Opponent	Score	Win	Loss	Save	Attendance	Record
79	July 1	Phillies	3–2	**McCutchen** (1–3)	Hamels (6–7)	**Dotel** (17)	25,323	28–51
80	July 2	Phillies	2–0	**Ohlendorf** (1–6)	Moyer (9–7)	**Dotel** (18)	30,339	29–51
81	July 3	Phillies	4–12	Kendrick (5–3)	**Maholm** (5–7)	—	38,052	29–52
82	July 4	Phillies	8–5	**Meek** (4–2)	Contreras (3–3)	**Dotel** (19)	28,698	30–52
83	July 6	@ Astros	2–6	Rodriguez (6–10)	**Lincoln** (1–3)	—	23,210	30–53
84	July 7	@ Astros	3–6	Daigle (1–1)	**McCutchen** (1–4)	Lindstrom (20)	23,123	30–54
85	July 8	@ Astros	0–2	Oswalt (6–10)	**Ohlendorf** (1–7)	—	24,416	30–55
86	July 9	@ Brewers	4–5 (10)	Axford (4–1)	**Meek** (4–3)	—	27,767	30–56
87	July 10	@ Brewers	3–4	Bush (4–6)	**Karstens** (2–4)	Axford (10)	38,588	30–57
88	July 11	@ Brewers	5–6	Axford (5–1)	**Dotel** (2–2)	—	34,598	30–58
89	July 16	Astros	2–5	Myers (7–6)	**Duke** (3–9)	Lindstrom (22)	23,273	30–59
90	July 17	Astros	12–6	**Lopez** (2–1)	Norris (2–7)	—	36,665	31–59
91	July 18	Astros	9–0	**Maholm** (6–7)	Oswalt (6–11)	—	16,638	32–59
92	July 19	Brewers	1–3	Capuano (1–1)	**Karstens** (2–5)	Axford (12)	12,375	32–60
93	July 20	Brewers	11–9	**Carrasco** (2–2)	Bush (4–8)	**Dotel** (20)	13,202	33–60
94	July 21	Brewers	15–3	**Duke** (4–9)	Wolf (7–9)	—	13,532	34–60
95	July 22	Brewers	2–3	Gallardo (9–4)	**Ohlendorf** (1–8)	Axford (13)	18,715	34–61
96	July 23	Padres	3–5	Correia (7–6)	**Maholm** (6–8)	Bell (28)	18,611	34–62
97	July 24	Padres	2–9	Latos (11–4)	**Karstens** (2–6)	—	36,967	34–63
98	July 25	Padres	3–6	LeBlanc (5–8)	**Lincoln** (1–4)	Bell (29)	18,800	34–64
99	July 27	@ Rockies	4–2	**Duke** (5–9)	De La	**Dotel** (21)	46,608	35–64
100	July 28	@ Rockies	6–2	**Gallagher** (1–0)	Cook (4–7)	—	35,128	36–64
101	July 29	@ Rockies	3–9	Jimenez (16–2)	**Maholm** (6–9)	—	34,158	36–65
102	July 30	@ Cardinals	0–1 (10)	Franklin (6–1)	**Lopez** (2–2)	—	44,534	36–66
103	July 31	@ Cardinals	1–11	Suppan (1–6)	**McCutchen** (1–5)	—	45,783	36–67

August (8–21)

#	Date	Opponent	Score	Win	Loss	Save	Attendance	Record
104	August 1	@ Cardinals	1–9	Wainwright (15–6)	**Duke** (5–10)	—	43,338	36–68
105	August 2	Reds	0–4	Wood (2–1)	**Ohlendorf** (1–9)	—	15,172	36–69
106	August 3	Reds	7–6	**Maholm** (7–9)	Leake (7–3)	**Hanrahan** (1)	13,623	37–69
107	August 4	Reds	4–9	Cueto (11–2)	**Karstens** (2–7)	—	20,420	37–70
108	August 5	Rockies	5–1	**McDonald** (1–1)	Francis (4–4)	—	17,131	38–70
109	August 6	Rockies	3–6	Hammel (8–6)	**Park** (0–1)	Street (7)	30,711	38–71
110	August 7	Rockies	8–7 (10)	**Gallagher** (2–0)	Street (2–3)	—	38,147	39–71
111	August 8	Rockies	4–8	Rogers (2–2)	**Maholm** (7–10)	—	22,716	39–72
112	August 10	@ Padres	1–4	LeBlanc (6–10)	**Karstens** (2–8)	Bell (32)	23,249	39–73
113	August 11	@ Padres	5–8	Correia (9–7)	**McDonald** (1–2)	Bell (33)	28,335	39–74
114	August 12	@ Padres	0–3	Garland (11–8)	**Duke** (5–11)	Bell (34)	25,897	39–75
115	August 13	@ Astros	1–4	Lopez (4–0)	**Meek** (4–4)	Lyon (3)	36,124	39–76
116	August 14	@ Astros	2–3	Norris (5–7)	**Maholm** (7–11)	Lyon (4)	31,608	39–77
117	August 15	@ Astros	2–8	Happ (3–1)	**Karstens** (2–9)	—	34,372	39–78
118	August 16	Marlins	7–1	**McDonald** (2–2)	Volstad (6–9)	—	13,396	40–78
119	August 17	Marlins	0–6	Nolasco (14–8)	**Duke** (5–12)	—	14,156	40–79
120	August 18	Marlins	2–3	Johnson (11–5)	**Ohlendorf** (1–10)	Oviedo (27)	12,242	40–80
121	August 19	Marlins	2–4	Sanabia (2–1)	**Maholm** (7–12)	Oviedo (28)	15,783	40–81
122	August 20	Mets	2–7	Pelfrey (12–7)	**Karstens** (2–10)	—	23,695	40–82
123	August 21	Mets	1–5 (5)	Niese (8–5)	**McDonald** (2–3)	—	28,759	40–83
124	August 22	Mets	2–1	**Duke** (6–12)	Santana (10–8)	**Hanrahan** (2)	24,730	41–83
125	August 23	Cardinals	2–10	Lohse (2–5)	**Ohlendorf** (1–11)	—	12,393	41–84
126	August 24	Cardinals	4–3	**Hanrahan** (3–1)	Wainwright (17–8)	**Meek** (2)	13,302	42–84
127	August 25	Cardinals	5–2	**McCutchen** (2–5)	Westbrook (1–2)	—	12,686	43–84
128	August 27	@ Brewers	2–7	Narveson (10–7)	**McDonald** (2–4)	—	32,130	43–85
129	August 28	@ Brewers	7–8 (11)	Loe (3–3)	**Ledezma** (0–1)	—	37,782	43–86
130	August 29	@ Brewers	4–8	Bush (7–11)	**Morton** (1–10)	Hoffman (8)	35,733	43–87
131	August 30	@ Cubs	2–14	Zambrano (6–6)	**Maholm** (7–13)	—	29,538	43–88
132	August 31	@ Cubs	14–7	**Karstens** (3–10)	Dempster (12–9)	—	31,369	44–88

September (12–15)

#	Date	Opponent	Score	Win	Loss	Save	Attendance	Record
133	September 1	@ Cubs	3–5	Diamond (1–3)	**McDonald** (2–5)	Marmol (25)	33,555	44–89
134	September 3	Nationals	8–5	**Duke** (7–12)	Hernandez (9–10)	**Hanrahan** (3)	19,734	45–89
135	September 4	Nationals	2–9	Lannan (7–6)	**Maholm** (7–14)	—	30,263	45–90
136	September 5	Nationals	1–8	Marquis (2–7)	**Morton** (1–11)	—	18,057	45–91
137	September 6	Braves	3–1	**Burres** (3–3)	Hanson (9–11)	**Hanrahan** (4)	15,330	46–91
138	September 7	Braves	5–0	**McDonald** (3–5)	Hudson (15–7)	—	11,070	47–91
139	September 8	Braves	3–9	Lowe (12–12)	**Duke** (7–13)	—	13,113	47–92
140	September 10	@ Reds	3–4 (12)	Smith (3–2)	**Ledezma** (0–2)	—	24,908	47–93
141	September 11	@ Reds	4–5 (10)	Cordero (6–4)	**Thomas** (0–1)	—	36,101	47–94
142	September 12	@ Reds	3–1	**Park** (1–1)	Cordero (6–5)	**Hanrahan** (5)	26,617	48–94
143	September 13	@ Mets	0–1 (10)	Takahashi (9–6)	**Park** (1–2)	—	24,384	48–95
144	September 14	@ Mets	1–9	Dickey (11–6)	**Duke** (7–14)	—	27,438	48–96
145	September 15	@ Mets	7–8	Valdes (3–3)	**Maholm** (7–15)	Takahashi (7)	29,000	48–97
146	September 16	@ Mets	2–6	Pelfrey (15–9)	**Ledezma** (0–3)	—	28,790	48–98
147	September 17	Diamondbacks	4–3	**Meek** (5–4)	Vasquez (1–6)	—	22,939	49–98
148	September 18	Diamondbacks	9–6	**McDonald** (4–5)	Enright (6–5)	—	25,981	50–98
149	September 19	Diamondbacks	4–3	**Hanrahan** (4–1)	Heilman (5–8)	**Meek** (3)	18,331	51–98
150	September 21	Cardinals	5–2	**Maholm** (8–15)	Westbrook (2–4)	**Meek** (4)	15,478	52–98
151	September 22	Cardinals	11–6	**Morton** (2–11)	Lohse (4–8)	—	11,785	53–98
152	September 23	Cardinals	2–9	Suppan (2–7)	**Burres** (3–4)	—	15,802	53–99
153	September 24	Astros	7–10	Myers (14–7)	**Leroux** (0–1)	Lyon (19)	22,279	53–100
154	September 25	Astros	6–4	**Duke** (8–14)	Norris (9–9)	**Hanrahan** (6)	25,350	54–100
155	September 26	Astros	9–3	**Maholm** (9–15)	Happ (6–3)	—	23,208	55–100
156	September 27	@ Cardinals	4–6	Reyes (3–1)	**Gallagher** (2–1)	McClellan (2)	38,592	55–101
157	September 28	@ Cardinals	7–2	**Burres** (4–4)	Suppan (2–8)	—	38,315	56–101
158	September 29	@ Cardinals	1–4	Walters (2–0)	**McDonald** (4–6)	—	38,112	56–102
159	September 30	@ Marlins	9–11	Volstad (12–9)	**Duke** (8–15)	Oviedo (30)	21,021	56–103

October (1–2)

#	Date	Opponent	Score	Win	Loss	Save	Attendance	Record
160	October 1	@ Marlins	5–1	**Park** (2–2)	Mendez (1–3)	—	23,124	57–103
161	October 2	@ Marlins	0–2	Sanches (2–2)	**Morton** (2–12)	Hensley (6)	25,332	57–104
162	October 3	@ Marlins	2–5	Sanchez (13–12)	**Burres** (4–5)	Hensley (7)	31,803	57–105

Legend: = Win = Loss
Bold = Pirates team member

==== Record vs. opponents ====
2010 National League record Source: MLB Standings Grid – 2010
Team	AZ	ATL	CHC	CIN	COL	FLA	HOU	LAD	MIL	NYM	PHI	PIT	SD	SF	STL	WSH	AL
Arizona	–	3–4	1–6	2–5	9–9	3–3	4–3	5–13	3–4	5–1	2–4	2–4	8–10	5–13	4–5	3–4	6–9
Atlanta	4–3	–	4–2	3–2	2–4	11–7	5–1	5–3	5–2	11–7	8–10	6–3	4–2	4–3	2–6	8–10	9–6
Chicago	6–1	2–4	–	4–12	2–3	4–2	7–11	3–4	9–6	3–4	4–2	5–10	3–5	2–5	9–6	4–2	8–10
Cincinnati	5–2	2–3	12–4	–	2–5	5–2	10–5	5–4	11–3	4–2	2–5	10–6	2–4	3–4	6–12	4–3	8–7
Colorado	9–9	4–2	3–2	5–2	–	3–4	2–4	7–11	5–4	3–3	1–6	3–4	12–6	9–9	3–4	5–3	9–6
Florida	3–3	7–11	2–4	2–5	4–3	–	3–3	4–2	4–4	12–6	5–13	6–2	3–6	2–5	3–2	13–5	7–8
Houston	3–4	1–5	11–7	5–10	4–2	3–3	–	2–4	8–7	3–4	4–3	11–4	2–5	2–7	10–5	4–4	3–12
Los Angeles	13–5	3–5	4–3	4–5	11–7	2–4	4–2	–	4–2	3–4	2–4	4–3	8–10	8–10	3–4	3–3	4–11
Milwaukee	4–3	2–5	6–9	3–11	4–5	4–4	7–8	2–4	–	5–2	1–5	13–5	3–4	2–5	8–7	4–2	9–6
New York	1–5	7–11	4–3	2–4	3–3	6–12	4–3	4–3	2–5	–	9–9	6–1	3–3	3–4	3–3	9–9	13–5
Philadelphia	4–2	10–8	2–4	5–2	6–1	13–5	3–4	4–2	5–1	9–9	–	2–4	5–2	3–3	4–4	12–6	10–8
Pittsburgh	4–2	3–6	10–5	6–10	4–3	2–6	4–11	3–4	5–13	1–6	4–2	–	0–6	2–4	6–9	1–5	2–13
San Diego	10–8	2–4	5–3	4–2	6–12	6–3	5–2	10–8	4–3	3–3	2–5	6–0	–	12–6	3–4	3–3	9–6
San Francisco	13–5	3–4	5–2	4–3	9–9	5–2	7–2	10–8	5–2	4–3	3–3	4–2	6–12	–	3–3	4–2	7–8
St. Louis	5–4	6–2	6–9	12–6	4–3	2–3	5–10	4–3	7–8	3–3	4–4	9–6	4–3	3–3	–	3–3	9–6
Washington	4–3	10–8	2–4	3–4	3–5	5–13	4–4	3–3	2–4	9–9	6–12	5–1	3–3	2–4	3–3	–	5–13

=== Detailed records ===
**National League**
Opponent	W	L	WP	RS	RA
**NL East**
Atlanta Braves	3	6	0.333	24	41
Florida Marlins	2	6	0.250	27	33
New York Mets	1	6	0.143	15	37
Philadelphia Phillies	4	2	0.667	21	32
Washington Nationals	1	5	0.167	20	38
Total	11	25	0.306	107	181
**NL Central**
Chicago Cubs	10	5	0.667	65	57
Cincinnati Reds	6	10	0.375	45	75
Houston Astros	4	11	0.267	63	76
Milwaukee Brewers	5	13	0.278	80	125
St. Louis Cardinals	6	9	0.400	52	80
Total	31	48	0.392	305	413
**NL West**
Arizona Diamondbacks	4	2	0.667	30	39
Colorado Rockies	4	3	0.571	33	35
Los Angeles Dodgers	3	4	0.429	25	38
San Diego Padres	0	6	0.000	14	35
San Francisco Giants	2	4	0.333	24	35
Total	13	19	0.406	126	182
**American League**
Chicago White Sox	0	3	0.000	10	18
Cleveland Indians	2	1	0.667	14	11
Detroit Tigers	0	3	0.000	8	14
Oakland Athletics	0	3	0.000	6	22
Texas Rangers	0	3	0.000	11	25
Total	2	13	0.133	49	90
Season Total	57	105	0.352	587	866

Month	Games	Won	Lost	Win %	RS	RA
April	23	10	13	0.435	82	161
May	29	11	18	0.379	86	136
June	26	6	20	0.231	82	133
July	25	9	16	0.360	108	122
August	29	8	21	0.276	99	166
September	27	12	15	0.444	123	140
October	3	1	2	0.333	7	8
Total	162	57	105	0.352	587	866

	Games	Won	Lost	Win %	RS	RA
Home	81	40	41	0.494	333	403
Away	81	17	64	0.210	254	463
Total	162	57	105	0.352	587	866

== Awards and honors ==
2010 Major League Baseball All-Star Game

- Evan Meek, P, reserve

NL Player of the Week Award

- Pedro Alvarez (September 20–26, 2010)

== Statistics ==
Hitting

Note: G = Games played; AB = At bats; H = Hits; Avg. = Batting average; HR = Home runs; RBI = Runs batted in

Regular season
Player	G	AB	H	Avg.	HR	RBI
E. Meek	66	1	1	1.000	0	0
P. Ciriaco	8	6	3	0.500	0	1
B. Lincoln	10	15	6	0.400	0	3
J. Tábata	102	405	121	0.299	4	35
N. Walker	110	426	126	0.296	12	66
A. McCutchen	154	570	163	0.286	16	56
L. Milledge	113	379	105	0.277	4	34
S. Pearce	15	29	8	0.276	0	5
A. Presley	19	23	6	0.261	0	0
P. Álvarez	95	347	89	0.256	16	64
R. Cedeño	139	468	120	0.256	8	38
R. Doumit	124	406	102	0.251	13	45
G. Jones	158	592	146	0.247	21	86
A. Díaz	22	33	8	0.242	0	2
D. Young	110	191	45	0.236	7	28
J. Bowker	26	69	16	0.232	2	13
B. Crosby	61	156	35	0.224	1	11
A. LaRoche	102	247	51	0.206	4	16
J. Clement	54	144	29	0.201	7	12
J. Raynor	11	10	2	0.200	0	0
R. Church	69	170	31	0.182	3	18
A. Iwamura	54	165	30	0.182	2	9
C. Snyder	40	124	21	0.169	5	16
B. Moss	17	26	4	0.154	0	2
J. Jaramillo	33	87	13	0.149	1	6
B. Burres	20	25	3	0.120	0	3
E. Kratz	9	34	4	0.118	0	1
P. Maholm	30	56	5	0.089	0	0
R. Ohlendorf	18	26	2	0.077	0	0
D. McCutchen	27	14	1	0.071	0	0
Z. Duke	32	48	3	0.063	0	0
J. Karstens	24	33	2	0.061	0	0
J. McDonald	11	20	1	0.050	0	0
C. Morton	17	26	1	0.038	0	0
B. Bass	4	1	0	0.000	0	0
D. Carrasco	41	6	0	0.000	0	0
D. Eveland	1	1	0	0.000	0	0
S. Gallagher	31	4	0	0.000	0	0
J. López	45	1	0	0.000	0	0
C. Park	26	1	0	0.000	0	0
J. Thomas	10	1	0	0.000	0	0
B. Donnelly	34	0	0	—	0	0
O. Dotel	39	0	0	—	0	0
J. Hanrahan	69	0	0	—	0	0
S. Jackson	10	0	0	—	0	0
C. Jakubauskas	1	0	0	—	0	0
W. Ledezma	27	0	0	—	0	0
C. Leroux	6	0	0	—	0	0
J. Martínez	5	0	0	—	0	0
H. Penn	3	0	0	—	0	0
Team totals	162	5,386	1,303	0.242	126	570

Pitching

Note: G = Games pitched; IP = Innings pitched; W = Wins; L = Losses; ERA = Earned run average; SO = Strikeouts

Regular season
Player	G	IP	W	L	ERA	SO
C. Resop	22	19	0	0	1.89	24
E. Meek	70	80	5	4	2.14	70
J. López	50	38 2/3	2	2	2.79	22
J. Martínez	5	8 2/3	0	0	3.12	6
C. Park	26	28 1/3	2	2	3.49	23
J. McDonald	11	64	4	5	3.52	61
J. Hanrahan	72	69 2/3	4	1	3.62	100
D. Carrasco	45	55 2/3	2	2	3.88	45
R. Ohlendorf	21	108 1/3	1	11	4.07	79
O. Dotel	41	40	2	2	4.28	48
J. Karstens	26	122 2/3	3	10	4.92	72
B. Burres	20	79 1/3	4	5	4.99	45
P. Maholm	32	185 1/3	9	15	5.10	102
B. Donnelly	38	30 2/3	3	1	5.58	26
Z. Duke	29	159	8	15	5.72	96
C. Leroux	6	4 2/3	0	1	5.79	4
S. Gallagher	31	34 1/3	2	1	6.03	22
J. Taschner	17	19 1/3	1	0	6.05	17
D. McCutchen	28	67 2/3	2	5	6.12	38
J. Thomas	12	13	0	1	6.23	5
B. Lincoln	11	52 2/3	1	4	6.66	25
W. Ledezma	27	19 2/3	0	3	6.86	22
C. Morton	17	79 2/3	2	12	7.57	59
D. Eveland	3	9 2/3	0	1	8.38	3
S. Jackson	11	11 1/3	0	1	8.74	7
B. Bass	4	7 1/3	0	0	12.27	5
C. Jakubauskas	1	2/3	0	1	27.00	0
H. Penn	3	2 1/3	0	0	30.86	0
Team totals	162	1,411 2/3	57	105	5.00	1,026

== Transactions ==
=== Pre-season ===
(November 4, 2009 – April 4, 2010)

- On November 20, 2009, the Pittsburgh Pirates claimed Chris Jakubauskas off waivers from the Seattle Mariners.
- On November 30, 2009, the Pittsburgh Pirates lost free agent Rubén Gotay to the St. Louis Cardinals.
- On November 30, 2009, the Pittsburgh Pirates signed Toronto Blue Jays free agent Wil Ledezma to a minor league contract.
- On December 3, 2009, the Pittsburgh Pirates promoted Kevan Graves to assistant director of baseball operations and hired Mike Basso as a major league scout, Toshi Nagahara as assistant trainer and Tyrone Brooks as director of baseball operations.
- On December 7, 2009, the Pittsburgh Pirates signed Cleveland Indians free agent Vinnie Chulk to a minor league contract.
- On December 10, 2009, the Pittsburgh Pirates signed free agent Bobby Crosby to a 1-year/$1 million contract, claimed John Raynor in Rule 5 major league draft (#2 overall from Florida Marlins) and claimed Rodolfo Cardona in Rule 5 AAA draft (#2 overall from Baltimore Orioles).
- On December 13, 2009, the Pittsburgh Pirates re-signed Ronny Cedeño to a 1-year/$1.125 million contract.
- On December 18, 2009, the Pittsburgh Pirates signed Boston Red Sox free agent Javier López to a 1-year contract.
- On December 23, 2009, the Pittsburgh Pirates signed Philadelphia Phillies free agent Jack Taschner to a minor league contract.
- On January 12, 2010, the Pittsburgh Pirates signed free agent Ryan Church to a 1-year contract and signed Brian Bass, Luke Carlin and Brian Myrow to minor league contracts.
- On January 14, 2010, the Pittsburgh Pirates signed free agent D. J. Carrasco to a minor league contract.
- On January 16, 2010, the Pittsburgh Pirates signed free agent Brendan Donnelly to a 1-year/$1.5 million contract.
- On January 18, 2010, the Pittsburgh Pirates traded Brian Bixler to the Cleveland Indians in exchange for Jesus Brito.
- On January 19, 2010, the Pittsburgh Pirates re-signed Zach Duke to a 1-year contract and claimed Brandon Jones off of waivers from the Atlanta Braves.
- On January 21, 2010, the Pittsburgh Pirates signed free agent Octavio Dotel to a 1-year contract.
- On March 2, 2010, the Pittsburgh Pirates re-signed Ramon Aguero, José Ascanio, Jeff Clement, Argenis Diaz, Joel Hanrahan, Kevin Hart, Gorkys Hernández, Chris Jakubauskas, Jason Jaramillo, Brandon Jones, Garrett Jones, Andy LaRoche, Brad Lincoln, Andrew McCutchen, Daniel McCutchen, Evan Meek, Lastings Milledge, Bryan Morris, Charlie Morton, Brandon Moss, Ross Ohlendorf, Steve Pearce, John Raynor, José Tábata, Ronald Uviedo, Donnie Veal, Neil Walker and Delwyn Young to 1-year contracts.
- On March 29, 2010, the Pittsburgh Pirates claimed Hayden Penn off of waivers from the Florida Marlins.

=== In-Season ===
(April 5, 2010 – November 1, 2010)

- On April 8, 2010, the Pittsburgh Pirates released Ramon Vazquez.
- On April 24, 2010, the Pittsburgh Pirates traded Jonathan Van Every to the Boston Red Sox in exchange for a player to be named later.
- On May 18, 2010, the Pittsburgh Pirates signed Latin American prospects Angel Sanchez, Brayan Almonte, Jose Acosta, Jose Roman, Oderman Rocha and Willy Garcia.
- On June 1, 2010, the Pittsburgh Pirates traded Ronald Uviedo to the Toronto Blue Jays in exchange for Dana Eveland.
- On June 15, 2010, the Pittsburgh Pirates signed draft picks Chase Lyles, Justin Bencsko, Justin Ennis, Kelson Brown, Kevin Decker and Matt Skirving and signed non-drafted free agent Kevin Mort.
- On June 18, 2010, the Pittsburgh Pirates signed draft picks Tyler Waldron and Vince Payne.
- On June 25, 2010, the Pittsburgh Pirates signed draft pick Justin Howard.
- On June 28, 2010, the Pittsburgh Pirates signed draft picks Casey Sadler, James Archibald and Jason Townsend.
- On July 2, 2010, the Pittsburgh Pirates signed draft pick Matt Curry.
- On July 7, 2010, the Pittsburgh Pirates acquired Sean Gallagher from the San Diego Padres in exchange for cash considerations.
- On July 15, 2010, the Pittsburgh Pirates signed draft pick Mel Rojas Jr.
- On July 20, 2010, the Pittsburgh Pirates signed non-drafted free agents Yunior Aquiles, Cristian Henriquez, Yunior Montero, Melvin Rosario, Miguel De Aza, Rodney Polonia, Isaac Sanchez and Heriberto Figueroa.
- On July 31, 2010, the Pittsburgh Pirates traded Octavio Dotel to the Los Angeles Dodgers in exchange for James McDonald and Andrew Lambo.
- On July 31, 2010, the Pittsburgh Pirates traded Javier López to the San Francisco Giants in exchange for Joe Martinez and John Bowker.
- On July 31, 2010, the Pittsburgh Pirates traded Bobby Crosby, D. J. Carrasco and Ryan Church to the Arizona Diamondbacks in exchange for Chris Snyder, Pedro Ciriaco and cash considerations.
- On August 4, 2010, the Pittsburgh Pirates claimed Chan Ho Park off of waivers from the New York Yankees and Chris Resop off of waivers from the Atlanta Braves.
- On August 9, 2010, the Pittsburgh Pirates signed draft picks Nick Kingham, Brandon Cumpton and Ryan Hafner.
- On August 16, 2010, the Pittsburgh Pirates signed draft picks Drew Maggi, Jared Lakind, Jameson Taillon and Stetson Allie.
- On August 24, 2010, the Pittsburgh Pirates signed Luis Heredia.
- On August 25, 2010, the Pittsburgh Pirates signed Dilson Herrera.
- On September 13, 2010, the Pittsburgh Pirates claimed Chris Leroux off of waivers from the Florida Marlins.
- On October 4, 2010, the Pittsburgh Pirates announced that John Russell has been relieved of his duties as the club's manager.

== Farm system ==
Level	Team	League	Manager
AAA	Indianapolis Indians	International League	Frank Kremblas
AA	Altoona Curve	Eastern League	Matt Walbeck
A	Bradenton Marauders	Florida State League	P. J. Forbes
A	West Virginia Power	South Atlantic League	Gary Green
A-Short Season	State College Spikes	New York–Penn League	Gary Robinson
Rookie	GCL Pirates	Gulf Coast League	Tom Prince
Rookie	DSL Pirates	Dominican Summer League	Ramon Zapata
Rookie	VSL Pirates	Venezuelan Summer League	Osmin Melendez

LEAGUE CHAMPIONS: Altoona, VSL Pirates
