= Neal Huntington =

American baseball executive (born 1969)

- Born: February 4, 1969 (age 57); Amherst, New Hampshire, U.S.
- Occupation: Former general manager of the Pittsburgh Pirates

Neal Alden Huntington (born February 4, 1969) is an American former General Manager of the Pittsburgh Pirates of Major League Baseball who currently works in the front office of the Cleveland Guardians as a special assistant to baseball projects.

== Background ==
A native of Amherst, New Hampshire, Huntington is a graduate of Milford Area Senior High and Amherst College, where he earned a Bachelor of Arts degree with a major in psychology in 1991. At Amherst, Huntington played baseball for four years; he was named a Division III second-team All-American first baseman and first-team All New England first baseman after his senior season. He earned a Master's Degree in sport management from the University of Massachusetts Amherst.

== Career ==
=== Montreal and Cleveland ===
Huntington spent 16 seasons in professional baseball prior to joining the Pirates. He became assistant director of player development with the Montreal Expos in 1995. He later moved to the Cleveland Indians, by whom he was employed for 10 seasons, serving first as the assistant director of Minor League operations before becoming director of player development (in 1998), assistant general manager (2002–2004), and finally special assistant to the general manager (2006–2007).

=== 2007 ===
Within two weeks of assuming the Pirates GM position, Huntington made several decisive moves on October 5, 2007: field manager Jim Tracy was fired; the remaining coaching staff was given notice that their contracts would likely not be renewed; and the senior director of player development, the scouting director, and the director of baseball operations were also let go.

On November 2, 2007, Huntington made clear that he was going to utilize some sabermetric techniques of player evaluation:

We are going to utilize several objective measures of player performance to evaluate and develop players. We'll rely on the more traditional objective evaluations: OPS (on-base percentage plus slugging percentage), WHIP (walks and hits per inning pitched), Runs Created, ERC (Component ERA), GB/FB (ground ball to fly ball ratio), K/9 (strikeouts per nine innings), K/BB (strikeouts to walks ratio), BB%, etc., but we'll also look to rely on some of the more recent variations: VORP (value over replacement player), Relative Performance, EqAve (equivalent average), EqOBP (equivalent on-base percentage), EqSLG (equivalent slugging percentage), BIP% (balls put into play percentage), wOBA (weighted on base average), Range Factor, PMR (probabilistic model of range) and Zone Rating.

That said, we will continue to stress the importance of our subjective evaluations. Succinctly stated, we believe that a combination of quality objective and subjective analysis will allow us to maximize our probability of success and to make the best possible decisions.

A few days later, on November 5, he named John Russell as the new field manager of the Pittsburgh Pirates. On November 7 he announced Greg Smith as the new scouting director, Kyle Stark as director of player development, and Bryan Minniti as director of baseball operations.

The new management team did not move quickly to make personnel changes at the player level, however. One month before the opening of Spring training in 2008, all but seven of the players on their 40-man roster had been in the Pirates organization in 2007. Three major factors appear to have led to this situation. First, Huntington felt that so many players had not performed up to their potential in 2007 that the Pirates were likely to win more games in 2008 if the same players only improved on their 2007 performances. Second, the marketability of many of these players had been hampered in the off-season because of their 2007 performance, and Huntington did not want to trade players at a price that was lower than what he considered their true value. Third, although Huntington did seek an immediate improvement of the team's competitiveness, he did not want to give up players who could contribute to the team's performance over the next three or four years simply to achieve a one-year increase in wins.

=== 2008 ===
During his first season, Huntington made two major trades leading up to the July 31 trade deadline. The first deal sent Xavier Nady and Dámaso Marte to the New York Yankees in exchange for minor leaguers José Tábata, Jeff Karstens, Ross Ohlendorf, and Dan McCutchen. In the second deal, Huntington shipped Jason Bay to the Boston Red Sox in exchange for Brandon Moss, Andy LaRoche, Craig Hansen, and minor leaguer Bryan Morris.

=== 2009 ===
Huntington continued the rebuilding during the 2009 season by trading star outfielder Nate McLouth to the Atlanta Braves on June 3 for outfielder Gorkys Hernández and pitchers Jeff Locke and Charlie Morton. Another big trade came on June 30, when Huntington acquired outfielder Lastings Milledge and pitcher Joel Hanrahan from the Washington Nationals in exchange for outfielder Nyjer Morgan and pitcher Sean Burnett. Huntington made yet another move on July 22 by trading starting first baseman Adam LaRoche to the Red Sox for minor leaguers Argenis Diaz and Hunter Strickland. On July 29, Huntington swung a seven-player deal with the Seattle Mariners that sent shortstop Jack Wilson, the Pirates' most tenured player, and pitcher Ian Snell to the Mariners for first baseman Jeff Clement, shortstop Ronny Cedeño and three minor league pitching prospects. Later that day, Huntington sent all-star second baseman Freddy Sanchez to the San Francisco Giants for highly regarded pitching prospect Tim Alderson. After the season ended, Huntington acquired second baseman Akinori Iwamura from the Tampa Bay Rays in exchange for pitcher Jesse Chavez.

=== 2010 ===
The 2010 season saw Pedro Alvarez, the club's top prospect and Huntington's 2008 first round draft pick, make his MLB debut, along with the emergence of other young talents, including José Tábata, Neil Walker, and Evan Meek. On July 31, Huntington continued to reshape the Pirates roster by acquiring catcher Chris Snyder and shortstop prospect Pedro Ciriaco from the Diamondbacks in exchange for back-up veterans Ryan Church, Bobby Crosby, and reliever D. J. Carrasco. Even more young players were added to the Pirates system, also on July 31, when Huntington shipped veteran reliever Javier López to the Giants for outfielder John Bowker and pitcher Joe Martinez, and closer Octavio Dotel to Dodgers for pitcher James McDonald and outfielder Andrew Lambo. Following the 105-loss season, Huntington hired Clint Hurdle as the new field manager of the Pirates.

=== 2011 ===
Although the Pirates finished below .500 for another consecutive year, the team started the season strong and was in first place in the National League Central by the All-Star break. This was the first time the Pirates had finished above .500 at the All-Star Break since 1992. Much of the success was attributed to good starting pitching performances by Huntington acquirees Jeff Karstens, Charlie Morton, James McDonald, and the newly signed Kevin Correia. In the bullpen, Joel Hanrahan established himself as one of the top closers in the game. Though the offense struggled for most of the year, Andrew McCutchen emerged as one of the game's most exciting and promising young hitters, as well as the Pirates' best hitter. In July, Correia, Hanrahan, and McCutchen were all selected to play for the National League in the 2011 All Star Game. On June 8, the Pirates drafted UCLA pitcher Gerrit Cole with the first overall pick in 2011 Major League Baseball draft.

On July 26, the Pirates suffered a heart breaking 19-inning loss against the Atlanta Braves, ending on a controversial call where home plate umpire Jerry Meals called runner Julio Lugo safe at home, although the replay showed that catcher Michael McKenry had clearly tagged him out. Meals admitted that the call may have been incorrect after watching the replay again. This loss appeared to be a turning point in the season, as the Pirates lost 15 of their next 18 games from July 27 to August 14, and at one point, lost 10 games in a row. The Pirates finished the season in 4th Place in the National League Central, with a record of 72–90.

In August, the team acquired veteran journeyman Jason Grilli from the Philadelphia Phillies. Grilli made a quick impression, pitching well in high leverage situations and earned manager Clint Hurdle's trust, prompting him to become the team's setup man next year.

=== 2012 ===
The Pirates were more aggressive in the offseason, signing veterans Rod Barajas, Clint Barmes, and Érik Bédard. On February 18, the Pirates acquired starting pitcher A. J. Burnett from the New York Yankees for two minor leaguers. The Pirates started the 2012 season strong, led by a starting rotation which ranked as one of the best in the majors through the first half of the season. James McDonald had an All Star caliber start to the season, holding a 9–3 record with an e.r.a. of 2.37 at the All Star Break in July. On the offense, Andrew McCutchen continued his solid hitting as the #3 hitter, driving in 96 runs, and slugging .553 with an on-base percentage of .400. Following a disappointing 2011 campaign, third baseman Pedro Álvarez had a breakout season, hitting 30 home runs and had a slugging percentage of .467 in his first full season in the major leagues.

The Pirates made a slew of moves at the 2012 trade deadline. They traded former prospect Brad Lincoln to the Toronto Blue Jays for outfielder Travis Snider. On the same day, the Pirates acquired struggling first baseman Gaby Sánchez from the Miami Marlins for outfielder Gorkys Hernández and a compensatory 1st round pick in the 2013 MLB draft. On July 31, the Pirates acquired pitcher Wandy Rodríguez from the Houston Astros for prospects pitcher Rudy Owens, outfielder Robby Grossman, and pitcher Colton Cain.

The Pirates lost 37 of their final 54 games, finishing with a 79–83 record and a record 20th consecutive losing season. first half of 2012, James McDonald struggled with his command, going 3–5 with an era of 7.08 in 12 second half starts. He was eventually moved to the bullpen and replaced in the rotation by prospects Jeff Locke and Kyle McPherson.

The 2012 Pirates garnered the dubious distinction of being the first professional baseball team to finish a season with a record below .500 despite being 16 games over .500 through 2/3 of the MLB season. Andrew McCutchen finished in third place in the voting for the NL's Most Valuable Player Award and won his first Gold Glove and Silver Slugger Awards.

=== 2013 ===
With a record of 337–474 and no winning seasons or playoff appearances, Neal Huntington entered his 5th season as Pirates general manager determined to be aggressive in free agency and hopefully, to add players and veteran leadership that would stave off another Pittsburgh Pirates playoff collapse in 2013. In the offseason, the team agreed with veteran catcher Russell Martin on a two-year, $17 million deal. Martin, while providing decent offensive numbers, was considered to be a major defensive upgrade over the previous year's platoon of Rod Barajas and Michael McKenry. In 2012, Barajas and McKenry had combined to throw out 19 of 173 baserunners, for a caught stealing percentage of 11%, while Russell Martin held a career caught stealing percentage of 30.25% entering the 2013 season. On December 26, the Pirates traded established closer Joel Hanrahan and infielder Brock Holt to the Boston Red Sox for reliever Mark Melancon, and prospects Jerry Sands, Ivan Dejesus, and Stolmy Pimentel. With this move, the Pirates resigned setup man Jason Grilli to a two-year deal worth $4.5 million, to become the new Pirates closer. Melancon, who was under-valued after a miserable injury-riddled 2012 season, replaced Grilli as the Pirates setup man. On February 8, the Pirates finalized a two-year, $12.75 deal with starting pitcher Francisco Liriano. The deal had been delayed two months because Liriano had broken his non-throwing arm in December 2012, and had refused to take a physical.

On September 9, 2013, the Pirates won their 82nd game to clinch their first winning season since 1992. They finished the season 94–68, securing the 1st wild card spot in the National League.

=== 2014 ===
Huntington received a 3-year contract extension on Saturday April 5, 2014 which will keep him through the 2017 season.

The Pirates finished the season 88–74 and for the 2nd year in a row, securing the 1st wild card spot

=== 2015 ===
The Pirates finished the season 98–64 and were again the first Wild Card team. However, they lost the wild card game for the second year in a row.

=== 2016 ===
The Pirates finished below the .500 mark in 2016 at 78–83 and subsequently missed the playoffs for the first time since 2012.

=== 2017 ===
The Pirates failed to reach the playoffs for the second consecutive year. However, the Pirates gave him a four-year contract extension.

=== 2018 ===
Before the 2018 season, Huntington traded Gerrit Cole to the Houston Astros for four players. This trade was widely viewed at the time as a negative for the Pirates, and has only looked worse as Cole emerged as one of the best pitchers in baseball. In the two seasons since the trade, Gerrit Cole accumulated 12.1 Wins Above Replacement, while the players the Pirates received have combined for 2.9 WAR During the season, the Pirates made a major trade with the Tampa Bay Rays, giving up Tyler Glasnow, Austin Meadows, and Shane Baz for veteran pitcher Chris Archer. At the time this was viewed as a relatively even trade, but since then the Pirates are widely seen as having lost the trade, including it being called a "fleecing". By one measure having given up 5 times as much value as the Rays, and the players the Pirates gave up have combined for 6.4 WAR compared to Archer's 0.7 WAR. David Schoenfield, a columnist for ESPN, wrote "Those two epic trade failures have crushed the Pirates' immediate future."

The Pirates finished the season with a winning record at 82–79; however, they finished fourth in the National League Central and 7.5 games behind the last wild card spot.

=== 2019 ===
Despite making win-now moves like the trade for Archer and Keone Kela the summer before, the Pirates had a quiet offseason in 2019, spending only $7 million on major league free agents. The Pirates were nonetheless expected to be contenders in a tight National League Central Division. After jumping out to a 12–6 start, the Pirates spent much of the first half of the season around .500, but went into the All-Star break only 2.5 games out of first place. Despite an underwhelming rotation, the team's offense was powered by a breakout season from Josh Bell and impressive play from Bryan Reynolds, who was acquired by Huntington in the McCutchen trade of 2018.

The Pirates fell apart in the second half of the season, going 25–48. In addition to their on-field struggles, the team suffered from problems off the field as well, including brawls, fights between players in the clubhouse, and the arrest of closer Felipe Vazquez. The Pirates finished with a 69–93 record, the team's worst since 2010. Clint Hurdle was fired before the final game of the season, and Huntington initially led efforts to find his replacement. Huntington was relieved of his duties on October 28, a few days after Travis Williams had been named the new team president.

=== 2022 ===
After two and half years out of baseball, on March 14, 2022 the Cleveland Guardians hired Huntington as a special assistant of baseball projects.

Preceded by Brian Graham	Pittsburgh Pirates General Manager; 2007-2019	Succeeded by Ben Cherington
