= Ronny Cedeño =

Venezuelan baseball player (born 1983)

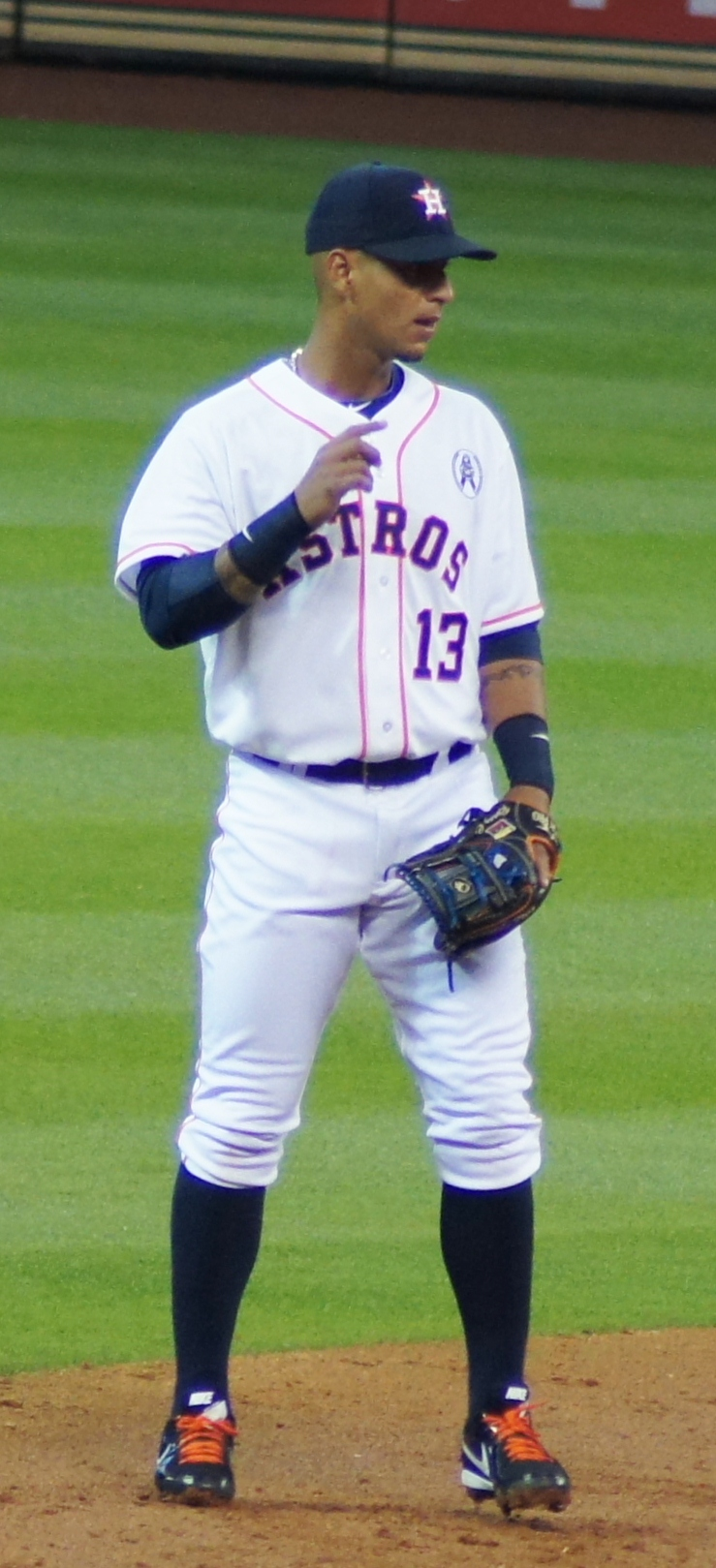
- Cedeño with the Astros in 2013
- Shortstop
- Born: February 2, 1983 (age 43); Puerto Cabello, Venezuela
- Batted: Right Threw: Right

MLB debut
- April 23, 2005, for the Chicago Cubs

Last MLB appearance
- June 28, 2014, for the Philadelphia Phillies

MLB statistics
- Batting average: .245
- Home runs: 40
- Runs batted in: 239
- Stats at Baseball Reference

Teams
- Chicago Cubs (2005–2008); Seattle Mariners (2009); Pittsburgh Pirates (2009–2011); New York Mets (2012); Houston Astros (2013); San Diego Padres (2013); Philadelphia Phillies (2014)

Ronny Alexander Salazar Cedeño (born February 2, 1983), is a Venezuelan former professional baseball shortstop, who played in Major League Baseball (MLB) for the Chicago Cubs, Seattle Mariners, Pittsburgh Pirates, New York Mets, Houston Astros, San Diego Padres, and Philadelphia Phillies. Cedeño batted and threw right-handed.

== Professional career ==
=== Chicago Cubs ===
Cedeño spent his five-season minor league career playing in the Cubs' farm system, reaching the Double-A level in 2004 with the Diamond Jaxx. In 116 games, he posted a .279 batting average with six home runs and 48 RBI. He was selected as a midseason Southern League All-Star.

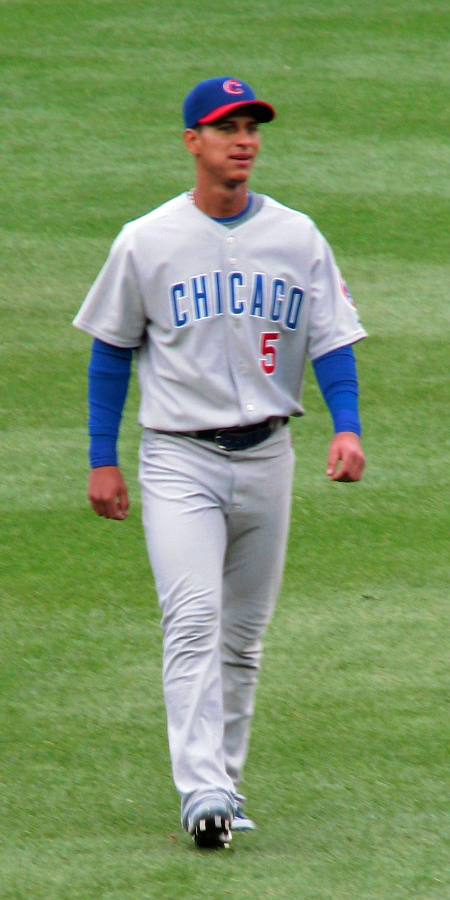
Cedeño in 2008 with the Cubs.

Cedeño was called up in April, 2005, to replace Nomar Garciaparra on the Cubs' roster. He made big-league debut for the Chicago Cubs on April 23 but spent most of his time on the bench, as Neifi Pérez was awarded the starting job. After the Cubs signed Enrique Wilson, Cedeño was sent back down to the Triple-A Iowa Cubs. In 65 games at Iowa in 2005, Cedeño batted an impressive .355, and slugged over .500 for the first time in his professional career. He returned to the Cubs in June after Wilson was himself sent down to Iowa.

Cedeño became the team's starting shortstop in 2006. He played in 151 games, hit .245, and had 25 errors. In 2006, he walked only 3.1% of the time, the lowest percentage in the National League, and 4 of his 17 walks were intentional walks. He also had the Major League's worst walk/strikeout ratio—0.16.

He played in the 2006 winter league for Venezuela, and averaged .555 in 45 games with 25 runs and 28 RBI.

Cedeño began 2007 with the Major League club on the bench, as the Cubs were set at shortstop and second base with César Izturis and Mark DeRosa. His offensive struggles continued, batting .118 at the big league level through August, and he spent several more months in Triple-A Iowa.

When the Cubs traded their starting center fielder Jacque Jones in November 2007, general manager Jim Hendry indicated that the club wasn't necessarily looking outside for a veteran, with Cedeño as well as Félix Pie and Sam Fuld in the mix. Cedeño was asked to play some center field during the winter.

In 2008, Cedeño made the Major League club out of spring training and spent the entire season with the Cubs, playing primarily off the bench as Reed Johnson and later Jim Edmonds were signed to play center field and Ryan Theriot was ensconced at shortstop. As the season progressed, he saw more opportunities to start at second base and shortstop, and got many opportunities off the bench as a pinch hitter and defensive replacement. He ended the year hitting .269 with 41 strikeouts in 216 at-bats, making 31 starts at second and 20 at shortstop.

=== Seattle Mariners ===
On January 28, 2009, Cedeño was traded with Garrett Olson to the Seattle Mariners for Aaron Heilman. Cedeño replaced Yuniesky Betancourt as starting shortstop for the Seattle Mariners after Betancourt was put on the DL and later traded to the Kansas City Royals. Cedeño made 39 starts at shortstop for Seattle, as well as a handful of starts at second, left field, and third base. He batted .167 in 206 plate appearances with Seattle.

=== Pittsburgh Pirates ===
On July 29, 2009, Cedeño was traded with Jeff Clement, Aaron Pribanic, Brett Lorin, and Nathan Adcock to the Pittsburgh Pirates for Jack Wilson and Ian Snell. He started 42 games at shortstop and batted .258 for Pittsburgh on the year.

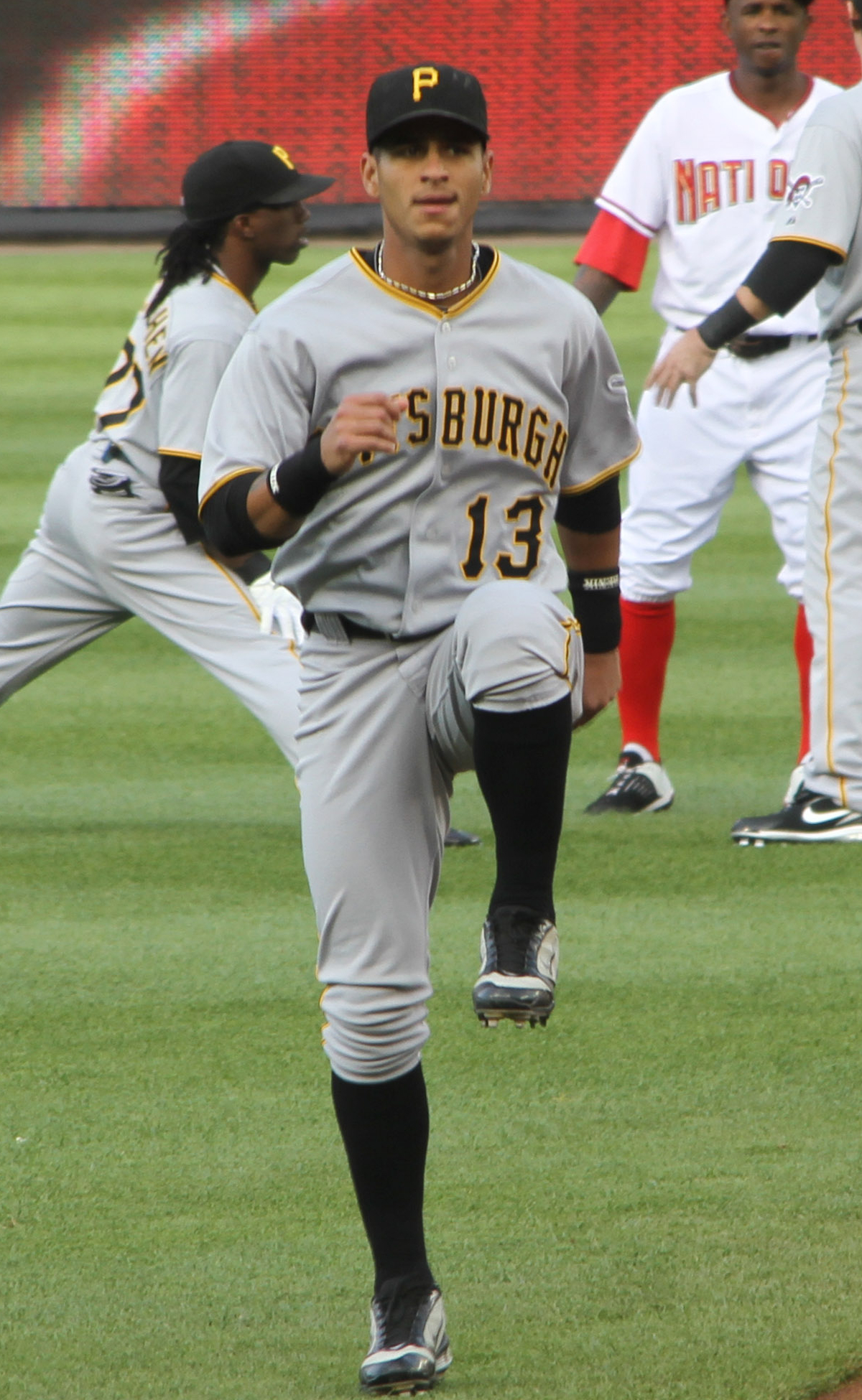
Cedeño with the Pirates in 2010.

Cedeño finished 2009 with 8 doubles, 3 triples, and a career high 10 home runs. He also drove in 38 runs, was issued a then-career high 19 walks, 3 of them intentional, struck out 79 times, and stole 5 bases, to go along with a .208 average, a .256 on-base percentage, a .337 slugging percentage, in 341 at-bats split between Seattle and Pittsburgh.

Cedeño was the Pirates Opening Day shortstop in 2010 and he made 132 starts on the year. He was briefly benched by manager John Russell in June as he struggled with consistency. He finished with a batting line of .256/.293/.382 and 18 errors in the field.

Although the Pirates pursued other shortstops during the off-season as there were questions about Cedeño's focus, he returned as the Opening Day starter in 2011. Cedeño made 118 starts at shortstop on the year with a brief trip to the disabled list in July with a concussion. He batted .249/.297/.339 with 13 errors. At the end of the season, the Pirates decided not to pick up Cedeño's $3 million option and signed Clint Barmes to play shortstop.

=== New York Mets ===
On January 6, 2012, Cedeño signed with the New York Mets for a one-year contract worth $1.2 million. Cedeño served as a reserve infielder, taking over briefly at shortstop when Rubén Tejada was lost to an injury in May. He played in a total of 78 games for the Mets, making 42 starts between second, short, and third, and committing just 4 errors. He surpassed offensive expectations by batting .259 with 4 home runs and a .741 OPS in 186 plate appearances.

=== St Louis Cardinals ===
On January 28, 2013, Ronny Cedeño signed a one-year contract with the St. Louis Cardinals. The deal was reported to be for a base salary of $1.15 million with incentives that could have increased to $2 million. However, the Cardinals released him on March 19 when they made the decision to give the starting shortstop job to Pete Kozma.

=== Houston Astros ===
On March 23, 2013, Cedeño agreed to a deal with the Houston Astros. He and Marwin González split time at shortstop, with Cedeño batting .220 with a .558 OPS in 155 plate appearances and making 11 errors in 37 starts. He was designated for assignment on July 22, 2013, and was released on July 28, as the Astros called up prospect Jonathan Villar.

=== San Diego Padres ===
On August 3, 2013, Cedeño agreed to a minor league contract with the San Diego Padres, in case starting shortstop Everth Cabrera was suspended in the Biogenesis scandal. He was assigned to their High-A affiliate, the Lake Elsinore Storm. After Cabrera was suspended, the Padres promoted Cedeño to the major leagues on August 6. He served as the Padres primary shortstop until he was hit in the head by a Heath Bell pitch on September 23. Although Cedeño never lost consciousness, he sat out the last week of the season with concussion-like symptoms. He made 34 starts at short for the Padres, making 2 errors and hitting .268 with 2 homers and a .684 OPS.

=== Philadelphia Phillies ===
On January 13, 2014, Cedeño signed a minor league contract with an invitation to spring training to play for the Philadelphia Phillies. He was released on March 25 and re-signed on April 2. He was outrighted off the roster on June 28, 2014.

=== Arizona Diamondbacks ===
On June 29, 2014, the Phillies traded Cedeño to the Arizona Diamondbacks in exchange for Raywilly Gomez. On October 11 he refused his minor league assignment and became a free agent.

=== San Francisco Giants ===
Cedeño signed a minor league contract with the San Francisco Giants in February 2015. On February 24, 2015 he was assigned to AAA Sacramento River Cats, but was released July 8.

=== Guerreros de Oaxaca ===
On July 15, 2015, Cedeño signed with the Guerreros de Oaxaca of the Mexican League. He became a free agent following the season. In 20 games he struggled hitting .217/.276/.333 with 2 home runs and 7 RBIs.

=== Unipol Bologna ===
Cedeño spent the 2016 season with Unipol Bologna of the Italian Baseball League. In 28 games he hit .358/.414/.517 with 3 home runs and 23 RBIs.

=== Olmecas de Tabasco ===
On April 18, 2017, Cedeño signed with the Olmecas de Tabasco of the Mexican League. He was released on April 21, without appearing in a game.

=== Venezuelan Professional Baseball League ===
Cedeño spent 2016–20 with Navegantes del Magallanes of the Venezuelan Professional Baseball League and the 2020–21 season with Leones del Caracas.

== See also ==
- List of Major League Baseball players from Venezuela
