= John Raynor =

American baseball player (born 1984)

- Outfielder
- Born: January 4, 1984 (age 42); Benson, North Carolina, U.S.
- Batted: Right Threw: Right

MLB debut
- April 8, 2010, for the Pittsburgh Pirates

Last MLB appearance
- April 25, 2010, for the Pittsburgh Pirates

MLB statistics
- Batting average: .200
- Home runs: 0
- Runs batted in: 0
- Stats at Baseball Reference

Teams
- Pittsburgh Pirates (2010)

John Patrick Raynor (born January 4, 1984) is an American former Major League Baseball outfielder who played for the Pittsburgh Pirates, although he spent most of his career in the Florida Marlins organization. He spent a season as a coach and student at his alma mater, UNC-Wilmington.

== High School and College ==
Raynor graduated from South Johnston High School in 2002. He attended the University of North Carolina at Wilmington. in 2005, for UNCW, he hit .397 with 23 stolen bases. Raynor was drafted by the Baltimore Orioles in the 12th round of the 2005 Major League Baseball draft, but did not sign. In 2006, his senior season, he hit .370 with 42 stolen bases. In the 2006 Major League Baseball draft, Raynor was selected in the 9th round by the Florida Marlins and signed by scout Joel Matthews.

== Professional baseball career ==
=== Florida Marlins ===
In the 2006 Major League Baseball draft, Raynor was selected in the 9th round by the Florida Marlins and signed by scout Joel Matthews. In 2006, Raynor played 54 games for the Marlins Class A Short-Season affiliate, the Jamestown Jammers in the New York–Penn League. He hit .286, 4, 21 with 21 SBs and was selected as a NY-Penn league all-star. He spent the entire 2007 campaign with the Marlins Class A affiliate, the Greensboro Grasshoppers in the South Atlantic League. Raynor hit .333, 13, 57 with 54 SBs and 110 Runs scored. He was named a South Atlantic League All-Star, MVP of the South Atlantic League, and was also selected as the Florida Marlins organizational Player of the Year for 2007.

Raynor spent 2008 with the Double-A Carolina Mudcats of the Southern League. There, he hit .312, 13, 51 with 48 SBs, and 104 Runs scored. He was named a Southern League All-Star and started in left field for the North Division in the all-star game.

That fall, Raynor was selected by the Marlins to participate in the Arizona Fall League for the Mesa Solar Sox. He played in 8 games for Mesa before being hit in the left hand by a pitch that cut his AFL season short. During his short time in Mesa, he hit at a .364, 1, 10 clip with 4 SBs, including hitting for the cycle on October 10 versus the Surprise Rafters.

On December 10, 2009, the Pittsburgh Pirates selected Raynor with the second pick in the 2009 Rule 5 draft.

He was offered back to the Marlins on May 4, 2010.

=== Pittsburgh Pirates ===
On December 10, 2009, the Pittsburgh Pirates selected Raynor with the second pick in the 2009 Rule 5 draft. He made the Pirates 2010 opening day roster.

Raynor walked in his major league debut on April 8, 2010, and got his first big league hit two at-bats later against San Francisco on April 12.

Raynor appeared in 11 games and had two hits, a walk and three strikeouts in 10 at-bats for the Pirates. He was designated for assignment on April 27 to make room for Jeff Karstens. The Pirates had hoped to make a deal to keep Raynor in the organization, but offered him back to the Marlins on May 4.

=== Retirement ===
After failing to make the opening day roster, the Marlins released Raynor on March 23, 2011. He decided to retire at the age of 27. He is now a coach/student at UNC-Wilmington.
