= Steven Jackson (baseball) =

American baseball player (born 1982)

- Pitcher
- Born: March 15, 1982 (age 44); Sumter, South Carolina, U.S.
- Batted: Right Threw: Right

MLB debut
- June 1, 2009, for the Pittsburgh Pirates

Last MLB appearance
- October 3, 2010, for the Pittsburgh Pirates

MLB statistics
- Win–loss record: 2–4
- Earned run average: 4.31
- Strikeouts: 28
- Stats at Baseball Reference

Teams
- Pittsburgh Pirates (2009–2010)

Steven Nash Jackson (born March 15, 1982) is an American former professional baseball pitcher. He played in Major League Baseball (MLB) for the Pittsburgh Pirates in 2009 and 2010.

== Amateur career ==
A native of Sumter, South Carolina, Jackson attended Summerville High School. He was selected by the Tampa Bay Devil Rays in the 38th round of the 2000 MLB draft, but chose to attend Clemson University instead. He pitched for Clemson for four years, going 19–8. In 2001 and 2002, he played collegiate summer baseball with the Falmouth Commodores of the Cape Cod Baseball League.

Jackson was drafted by the Cleveland Indians in the 32nd round of the 2003 MLB draft but returned to Clemson for his senior year. The Arizona Diamondbacks drafted him in the 10th round of the 2004 MLB draft and he signed.

== Professional career ==
=== Arizona Diamondbacks ===
Jackson pitched in the Diamondbacks minor league system from 2004 to 2006. In 2004, he moved from the Rookie-level Missoula Osprey in the Pioneer League to the Yakima Bears of the Northwest League in Low-A. He spent the 2005 season with the High-A South Bend Silver Hawks in the Midwest League, pitching to a 5.33 ERA in 28 starts. In 2006, he had a 2.65 ERA in 24 starts for the Tennessee Smokies of the Double-A Southern League. He then pitched to a 7.11 ERA in six starts while with the Scottsdale Scorpions of the Arizona Fall League.

=== New York Yankees ===
On January 9, 2007, he was traded by the Diamondbacks to the New York Yankees (along with Ross Ohlendorf, Luis Vizcaíno and Alberto Gonzalez) for Randy Johnson. He started the season in Triple-A with the Scranton/Wilkes-Barre Yankees, but was demoted to Double-A after posting a 5.87 ERA in 69 innings between the bullpen and rotation. He again pitched in the Arizona Fall League, this time for the Peoria Javelinas, allowing 10 runs on 21 hits in just 16 inning of work out of the bullpen.

Jackson spent the 2008 season between Double-A and Triple-A, managing a 3.17 ERA in 48.1 innings with Scranton. He was called up on April 19, 2009, to provide bullpen depth but never appeared in a game. After spending several days with the team, he was optioned back to Triple-A on April 28. Jackson spent the 2009 season in Scranton, pitching to a 4.45 ERA in 19 games.

=== Pittsburgh Pirates ===
On May 8, 2009, Jackson was designated for assignment by the Yankees and claimed off waivers by the Pittsburgh Pirates. He made his Major League debut for the Pirates on June 1, 2009, against the New York Mets, working one scoreless inning of relief. He appeared in 40 games in 2009 and 11 in 2010 for the Pirates, with a 2–4 record and 4.31 ERA. He also played 53 games with the Triple-A Indianapolis Indians during that stretch. In his 40 Major League appearances he gave up 38 hits, allowed 15 earned runs, gave up two home runs, walked 22 batters, struck out 21 batters, and had a .236 average against in just 43 innings with the Bucs.

On January 19, 2011, Jackson was designated for assignment by Pittsburgh.

=== Los Angeles Dodgers ===
On March 10, 2011, he signed a minor league contract with the Los Angeles Dodgers. He was assigned to the Double-A Chattanooga Lookouts and promoted to the Triple-A Albuquerque Isotopes on May 11. Jackson was released by the Dodgers organization on May 19.

=== Cincinnati Reds ===
On May 22, 2011, Jackson signed a minor league contract with the Cincinnati Reds. He was assigned to the Triple-A Louisville Bats the following day.

=== Pittsburgh Pirates ===
On June 24, 2011, Jackson was traded to the Pittsburgh Pirates in exchange for a player to be named later.

On February 29, 2012, announced his retirement, just before the start of spring training. Jackson was inducted into the Charleston Baseball Hall of Fame in 2013.
