= Andy LaRoche =

American baseball player (born 1983)

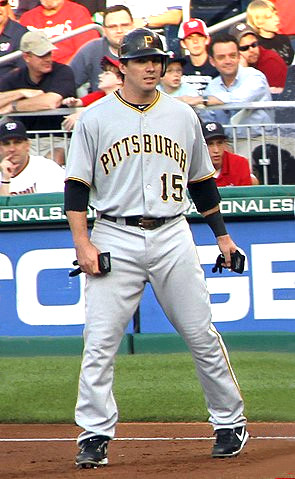
- LaRoche with the Pittsburgh Pirates in 2010
- Third baseman
- Born: September 13, 1983 (age 42); Fort Scott, Kansas, U.S.
- Batted: Right Threw: Right

MLB debut
- May 6, 2007, for the Los Angeles Dodgers

Last MLB appearance
- June 9, 2013, for the Toronto Blue Jays

MLB statistics
- Batting average: .226
- Home runs: 22
- Runs batted in: 113
- Stats at Baseball Reference

Teams
- Los Angeles Dodgers (2007–2008); Pittsburgh Pirates (2008–2010); Oakland Athletics (2011); Toronto Blue Jays (2013)
Medals
Men's baseball
Representing United States
Baseball World Cup
Gold medal – first place	2007 Tianmu	National team

Andrew Christian LaRoche (born September 13, 1983) is an American former professional baseball third baseman. He played in Major League Baseball (MLB) for the Los Angeles Dodgers, Pittsburgh Pirates, Oakland Athletics, and Toronto Blue Jays.

LaRoche is the son of Dave LaRoche, a former Major League Baseball pitcher for the California Angels, and brother of former first baseman and designated hitter Adam LaRoche. Andy and Adam played together on the Pirates in 2008 and 2009.

== College and draft ==
LaRoche played shortstop for Grayson County College. He also played for the Keene Swamp Bats of the New England Collegiate Baseball League. In 2003, he played collegiate summer baseball with the Wareham Gatemen of the Cape Cod Baseball League and was named a league all-star. He had been originally a catcher but switched positions due to an injury. He was originally drafted in the 21st round by the San Diego Padres in 2002, but he turned down an offer estimated at $200,000 and remained in school for another year. He re-entered the draft the following year, and, despite having broken a bone in his left leg in a collision at first base, his stock soared and scouts projected him as a first rounder. However, teams were concerned about their ability to sign him, as he had turned down the Padres' offer and was planning on transferring to Rice University.

Nevertheless, he was drafted in the 39th round of the 2003 Major League Baseball draft by the Los Angeles Dodgers, but still got supplemental money when the Dodgers signed him in August 2003. At the time, his bonus was the highest for a "non draft and follow" outside the first three rounds.

== Playing career ==
=== Los Angeles Dodgers ===
Concern about his range caused the Dodgers to move him from shortstop to third base prior to sending him to their rookie league team, the Ogden Raptors, for the last few games of the 2003 season.

He started the 2004 season with the Dodgers Single-A team in Columbus, hitting .283 with 13 home runs and 42 RBI before being promoted to the higher Single-A team in Vero Beach where he struggled a bit, hitting only .237 with 10 HRs and 34 RBI.

In 2005, at Vero Beach, he hit .333 with 21 HRs and 51 RBI and received a call-up to the Double-A Jacksonville Suns. At Jacksonville, he hit .273 with 9 HRs and 43 RBI. He was voted the Dodgers Minor League Player of the Year.

For the 2006 minor league season, he started at Jacksonville and hit .309 with 9 HRs and 46 RBI. He would be called up to the Triple-A Las Vegas 51s, where he hit .322 with 10 HRs and 35 RBI.

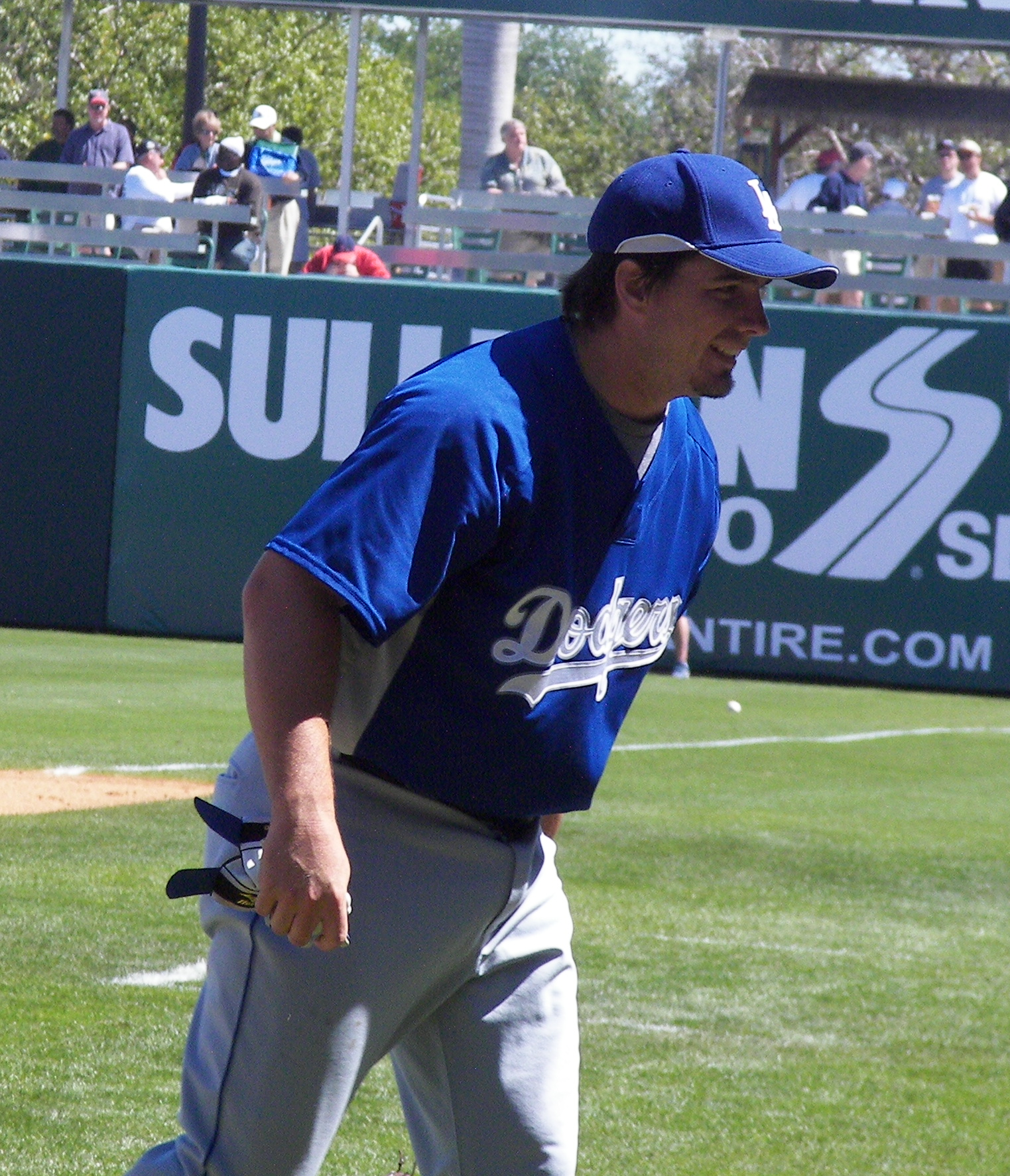
LaRoche during his tenure with the Los Angeles Dodgers in 2007 spring training

During LaRoche's second big league spring training in 2007, he noted that his last name should be spelled "La Roche" with a defined space. However, as reported by Steve Henson of the Los Angeles Times, he decided to revert to the previous spelling by the end of camp.

LaRoche made his major league debut on May 6, 2007, against the Atlanta Braves. He recorded his first major league hit, a ground rule double, against Kyle Davies. The following day, May 7, LaRoche recorded his first two RBI against the Florida Marlins. After being demoted to Triple-A Las Vegas, LaRoche was recalled on September 1. LaRoche received more playing time in September due to Nomar Garciaparra's injury problems. On September 20, LaRoche hit his first major league home run off Colorado Rockies pitcher Matt Herges.

LaRoche played for Team USA in the 2007 Baseball World Cup during the MLB off-season.

On March 7, 2008, while playing a spring training game against the St. Louis Cardinals, LaRoche tore the ulnar collateral ligament in the base of his right thumb. In a freak accident, LaRoche was attempting to catch a pickoff throw from catcher Danny Ardoin. The throw deflected off Cardinals base runner D'Angelo Jiménez and struck LaRoche on his throwing hand. LaRoche was injured in the fifth inning, having taken over third base duties for Nomar Garciaparra, who was injured an inning earlier when he was struck on the wrist with a pitch. At the time, LaRoche and Garciaparra were in competition for the starting third base job. Neither player could begin the season, and minor league rookie Blake DeWitt assumed third base duties on opening day.

On May 3, after completing a ten-game rehab assignment with the Double-A Jacksonville Suns and the Triple-A Las Vegas 51s, LaRoche was reinstated from the disabled list and optioned to the 51s. This move was seen as Dodgers management endorsing Blake DeWitt, who had played well enough to keep his starting role while LaRoche was on the disabled list.

LaRoche was recalled from Las Vegas on June 10 and made his 2008 debut the next day at first base. He hit a home run against Padres starter Randy Wolf in the fourth inning.

=== Pittsburgh Pirates ===
On July 31, 2008, LaRoche, along with pitcher Bryan Morris, was traded to the Pittsburgh Pirates in part of a three-team deal that sent Manny Ramirez to the Los Angeles Dodgers and Jason Bay to the Boston Red Sox. LaRoche joined his brother Adam in Pittsburgh. After hitting .144 while with the Pirates in 2008, LaRoche was given an "intensive offseason workout regimen" throughout the offseason.

His reunion with brother Adam ended on July 22, 2009, when the Pirates traded Adam to the Boston Red Sox for minor-league pitcher Hunter Strickland and shortstop Argenis Díaz. Nine days later, the Red Sox traded Adam to the Atlanta Braves for Casey Kotchman.

On November 20, 2010, Andy was designated for assignment by the Pirates and made a free agent.

=== Oakland Athletics ===
On January 24, 2011, LaRoche signed a minor-league deal with the Oakland Athletics with an invite to major league camp. He made the Opening Day roster, appearing in 40 games before being designated for assignment on June 5. He was assigned to the Athletics' Triple-A affiliate, the Sacramento River Cats. On August 18, 2011, in a tied extra-inning game against the Omaha Storm Chasers, he pitched the 13th inning, and was awarded the win. After the 2011 season, he elected for free agency.

=== Cleveland Indians ===
On December 21, 2011, LaRoche signed a minor-league contract with the Cleveland Indians. He also received an invitation to spring training. LaRoche was released by the Indians organization on June 26, 2012.

=== Boston Red Sox ===
On June 28, 2012, LaRoche signed a minor-league contract with the Boston Red Sox. He played with the Pawtucket Red Sox for the rest of the season, appearing in 50 games. At the end of the season, he became an unrestricted free agent.

=== Toronto Blue Jays ===
On January 30, 2013, LaRoche signed a minor-league contract with the Toronto Blue Jays with an invite to spring training. LaRoche started the season with the Triple-A Buffalo Bisons, and was called up on June 7 as a potential fill-in at third base for the injured Brett Lawrie and recently demoted Anthony Gose. LaRoche was designated for assignment following a 10-6 loss to the Chicago White Sox, having played just one game for the Blue Jays and going 0-4 at the plate. After clearing waivers, LaRoche was assigned outright to Buffalo on June 13. He became a free agent on October 1. He signed a minor league contract with the Blue Jays for the 2014 season.

=== Chicago White Sox ===
On January 23, 2015, LaRoche signed a minor league contract with the Chicago White Sox. He was released by the White Sox organization on April 1.

=== Wichita Wingnuts ===
Following his release, LaRoche signed with the Wichita Wingnuts of the American Association of Independent Professional Baseball and finished the 2015 season with them. In 26 games for Wichita, he hit .269/.386/.559 with six home runs and 23 RBI.

=== Sugar Land Skeeters ===
On February 26, 2016, LaRoche was traded to the Sugar Land Skeeters of the Atlantic League of Professional Baseball. In 16 games for the Skeeters, he batted .269/.356/.423 with no home runs and six RBI. LaRoche became a free agent after the season.

== Coaching career ==
On January 7, 2019, LaRoche was hired by the Kansas City Royals to serve as the hitting coach for their rookie-level affiliate, the Burlington Royals. On January 13, 2023, LaRoche was named the hitting coach for the Kansas City's Double-A affiliate, the Northwest Arkansas Naturals.

== Awards and honors ==
- No. 26 – MLN FAB50 Baseball 2006 – Minor League News

== See also ==
- List of second-generation Major League Baseball players
