= Ross Ohlendorf =

American baseball player (born 1982)

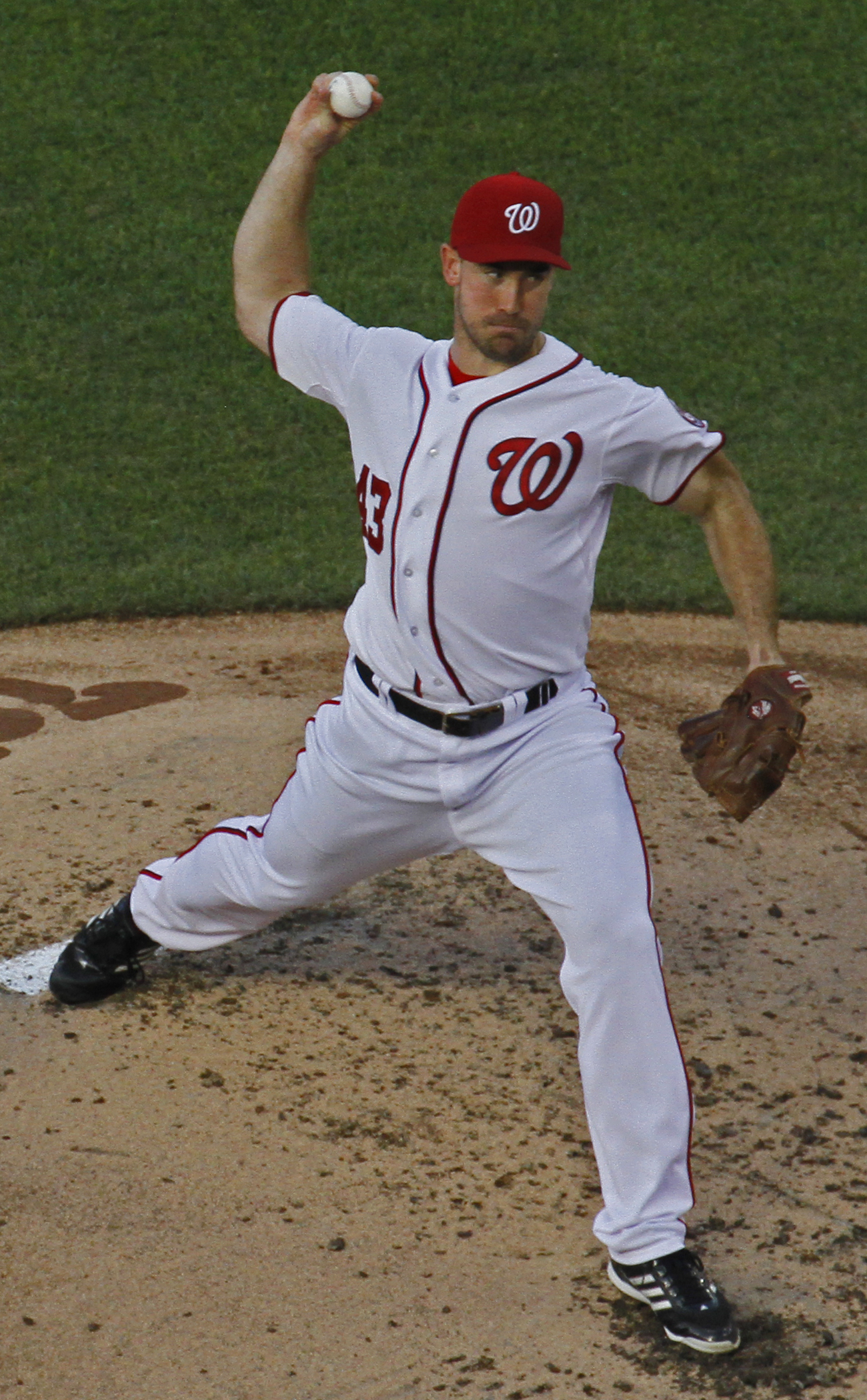
- Ohlendorf with the Washington Nationals
- Pitcher
- Born: August 8, 1982 (age 44); Austin, Texas, U.S.
- Batted: Right Threw: Right

Professional debut
- MLB: September 11, 2007, for the New York Yankees
- NPB: April 2, 2017, for the Tokyo Yakult Swallows

Last appearance
- MLB: October 2, 2016, for the Cincinnati Reds
- NPB: July 17, 2017, for the Tokyo Yakult Swallows

MLB statistics
- Win–loss record: 30–41
- Earned run average: 4.82
- Strikeouts: 444

NPB statistics
- Win–loss record: 0–1
- Earned run average: 5.50
- Strikeouts: 15
- Stats at Baseball Reference

Teams
- New York Yankees (2007–2008); Pittsburgh Pirates (2008–2011); San Diego Padres (2012); Washington Nationals (2013); Texas Rangers (2015); Cincinnati Reds (2016); Tokyo Yakult Swallows (2017)

Curtis Ross Ohlendorf (born August 8, 1982) is an American former professional baseball pitcher. He played in Major League Baseball (MLB) for the New York Yankees, Pittsburgh Pirates, San Diego Padres, Washington Nationals, Texas Rangers, and Cincinnati Reds, and in the Nippon Professional Baseball (NPB) for the Tokyo Yakult Swallows.

== High school and college career ==
Ohlendorf was born in Austin, Texas. His family owns a Texas Longhorn ranch that Ohlendorf helps maintain. He graduated from St. Stephen's Episcopal High School in Austin in 2001 where he was a two-sport athlete, playing basketball and baseball.

Ohlendorf attended Princeton University, where he majored in Operations Research and Financial Engineering. He also played college baseball for the Princeton Tigers baseball team. In 2002, as a freshman pitcher, he was named the Ivy League Rookie of the Year. Ohlendorf, a second-team All-Ivy selection, was 3rd in the League with a 3.02 ERA. He finished with a 6–2 record. In 2003, he played collegiate summer baseball for the Chatham A's of the Cape Cod Baseball League. As a student, he penned a 140-page senior thesis entitled Investing in Prospects: A Look at the Financial Successes of Major League Baseball Rule IV Drafts from 1989 to 1993.

Ohlendorf completed his degree at Princeton in 2006 while in the Arizona Diamondbacks' farm system. He received the George Mueller Award from the university for combining "high scholarly achievement in the study of engineering with quality performance in intercollegiate athletics". In his senior thesis, Ohlendorf used sabermetrics to demonstrate the return on investment from the Major League Baseball draft.

== Professional career ==
=== Arizona Diamondbacks ===
Ohlendorf was selected in the fourth round (116th overall) of 2004 Major League Baseball draft by the Diamondbacks. In 2004, Ohlendorf was chosen by Baseball America as one of the Northwest League's Top 20 prospects. In 2005, he was named to the Midwest League All-Star team. He finished the season tied for the team lead with 11 victories, and second in the league with 144 strikeouts.

In 2006, playing for the Diamondbacks AA affiliate, the Tennessee Smokies, Ohlendorf went 10–8 with a 3.29 ERA and led the Southern League with four complete games, earning a promotion to AAA Tucson for one playoff start.

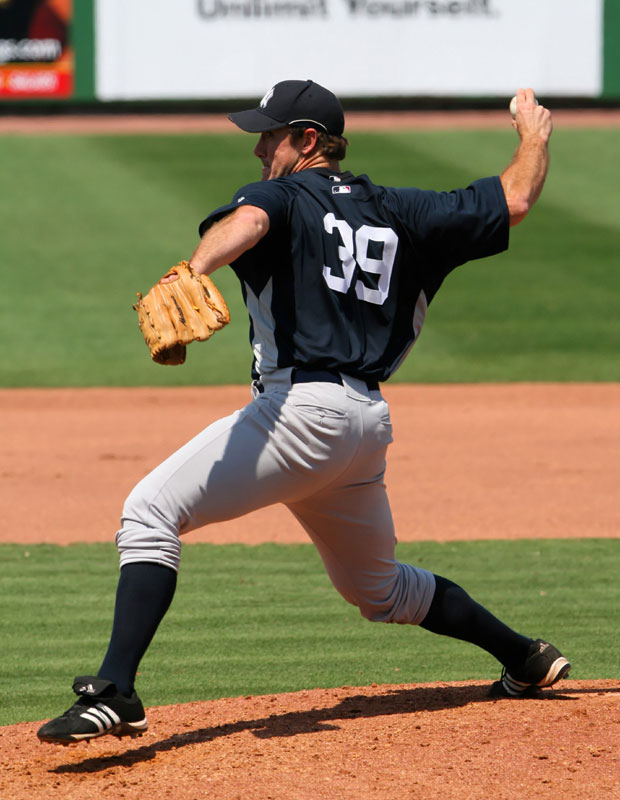
Ohlendorf pitching for the New York Yankees in 2008 spring training

=== New York Yankees ===
Before the 2007 season, the Diamondbacks traded Ohlendorf, Luis Viscaino, Alberto Gonzalez, and Steven Jackson to the New York Yankees for Randy Johnson. Yankees General Manager Brian Cashman said of Ohlendorf: "He's big, physical, eats innings and he's competitive. He's a workhorse."

Ohlendorf pitched mostly for the AAA Scranton/Wilkes-Barre Yankees in 2007. Ohlendorf struggled with injuries and inconsistency as a starter with Scranton and was moved to the bullpen. Ohlendorf embraced his new role and pitched extremely effectively, able to maintain a higher velocity and precision on his pitches due to shorter outings. On September 9, when Scranton was eliminated from the playoffs, Ohlendorf was promoted to the Major Leagues.

On September 11, he pitched in his first Major League game against the Toronto Blue Jays for the Yankees. He pitched one inning without allowing a baserunner while striking out one. On September 15, he pitched 1 1/3 innings against the Boston Red Sox, allowing a walk and a home run, but recording all four outs on strikeouts. Ohlendorf impressed the Yankees enough in September to earn a spot on the ALDS roster, but struggled in his lone appearance in the series, allowing three runs on four hits and one walk in one inning.

=== Pittsburgh Pirates ===
On July 26, 2008, Ohlendorf was acquired by the Pittsburgh Pirates from the New York Yankees in a deal with José Tábata, Jeff Karstens, and Daniel McCutchen for Xavier Nady and Dámaso Marte.

Ohlendorf spent the first month pitching for the AAA Indianapolis Indians and was called up to Pittsburgh on September 2 when the rosters expanded. He was added to the starting rotation and made his first appearance on September 3 against the Cincinnati Reds where he pitched six innings and allowed four runs (three earned) in a 6–5 Pirates victory. When Ohlendorf faced Will Venable who batted leadoff on September 28, 2008, for San Diego, he became the first Princeton pitcher to oppose a Princeton batter.

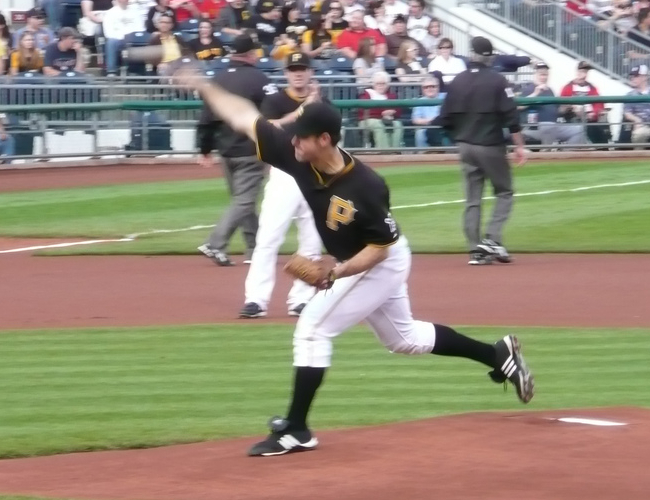
Ohlendorf pitching for the Pittsburgh Pirates in 2009

Ohlendorf was a stamina pitcher, often lasting late into games. In all, he threw 176 2/3 innings, 45 more than his previous year total. The Pirates would shut him down for the remainder of the season following his September 19 start to rest him for next year. Pirates General Manager Neal Huntington would say, "We're looking forward to working with him to put him in position to where he can be a 200-plus inning starter for many, many years to come."

On September 5, 2009, Ohlendorf became the 40th major-league pitcher to throw an immaculate inning, striking out all three St. Louis Cardinals batters in the seventh inning on nine total pitches. Ohlendorf would pitch his first full season in the majors for the Pirates in 2009. His final 2009 stats were an 11–10 record, a 3.92 ERA, 25 home runs allowed, seven hit batsmen, 53 walks, 109 strikeouts, a .255 average against, and a 1.23 walks and hits per inning pitched in 176.2 innings. He would earn the status of being the only Pirates starter to have a winning record.

Ohlendorf was hit in the head by a line drive off of Troy Tulowitzki's bat in a July 28, 2010, game against the Colorado Rockies. He left the game as a precaution. This was the second time in 2010 a Pirates pitcher was hit in the head by a line drive, the first being Chris Jakubauskas. Unlike Jakubauskas, Ohlendorf did not miss any starts. Following the season and a 1–11 record with a 4.07 ERA, Ohlendorf won his arbitration hearing and a $439,000 raise to $2,025,000.

Ohlendorf only made two starts in 2011 before going on the disabled list with a shoulder strain, and after experiencing a setback in his rehab program did not make another major league start until August 23. On September 15, Ohlendorf hit his first career home run off Dana Eveland, also becoming the first Pirates pitcher to homer since Paul Maholm did so on May 9, 2009, against the New York Mets. Ohlendorf finished 2011 with a 1–3 record in nine games with an 8.15 ERA. On December 7, 2011, Ohlendorf was released by the Pirates.

=== Boston Red Sox ===
On February 16, 2012, Ohlendorf signed a minor league contract with the Boston Red Sox. He was assigned to the Triple-A Pawtucket Red Sox where he compiled a 4–3 record and 4.61 ERA in 10 starts. Ohlendorf opted out of his contract of June 1, 2012, and became a free agent.

=== San Diego Padres ===
On June 4, 2012, Ohlendorf signed a one-year deal with the San Diego Padres. He was initially used out of the bullpen, but numerous injuries to the Padres' rotation gave him an opportunity to start. He made his first major league start of the season on June 16.

Ohlendorf made nine starts in 13 total appearances for the Padres and posted a 4–4 record and a 7.58 ERA in 48 2/3 innings. He was optioned to Triple-A Tucson on August 18 after lasting only 13 total innings in his last four starts with a 14.54 ERA. The Padres designated Ohlendorf for assignment on September 4, and he became a free agent after the season.

=== Washington Nationals ===
On January 10, 2013, Ohlendorf signed a minor league contract with the Washington Nationals. On July 26, 2013, he started against the New York Mets in the second game of a day/night double header. Ohlendorf enjoyed a successful 2013 season, recording 4 wins and a 3.28 ERA in 16 appearances. After the season, Ohlendorf signed a one-year deal to return to Washington, avoiding arbitration.

On March 26, 2014, the Nationals voided Ohlendorf's deal by sending him down to AAA. Ohlendorf did not pitch in the Majors due to numerous injuries, including a back injury which limited him to appearing in just five minor league games. After the season, he became a free agent.

=== Texas Rangers ===
On January 23, 2015, Ohlendorf signed a minor league contract with the Texas Rangers. He was called up to the majors on May 17. Ohlendorf pitched seven and two thirds innings for the Rangers, striking out nine while allowing three runs in eight appearances out of the bullpen. On June 7, he was placed on the disabled list with a strained right groin. On July 27, he was designated for assignment by the Rangers. He was released on July 31. He was re-signed by the Rangers on August 5, and added to the major league roster on September 1. In the 14th inning of Game 2 of the 2015 American League Division Series, Ohlendorf would pick up a save in the Rangers 6-4 win over the Toronto Blue Jays. He became a free agent following the season.

=== Kansas City Royals ===
On February 18, 2016, the Kansas City Royals signed Ohlendorf to a minor league contract. He opted out of his minor league contract on March 21 and became a free agent on March 23, after the Royals declined to add him to the 40-man roster.

=== Cincinnati Reds ===
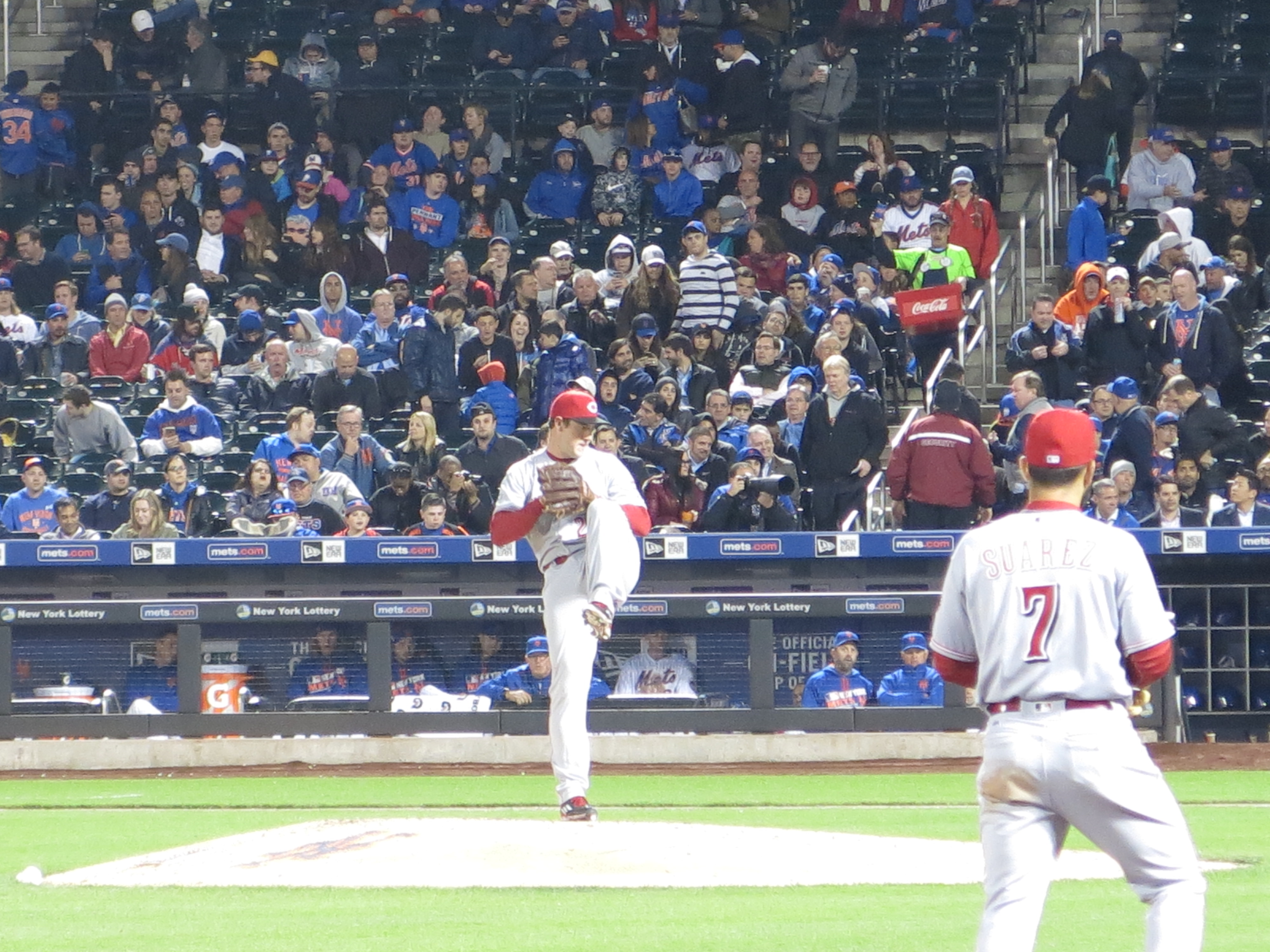
Ohlendorf pitching for the Reds in 2016

On March 26, 2016, Ohlendorf signed a one-year, major league contract with the Cincinnati Reds. He became a free agent following the season.

=== Tokyo Yakult Swallows ===
On December 23, 2016, Ohlendorf signed with the Tokyo Yakult Swallows of Nippon Professional Baseball (NPB). He was released on September 14, 2017.

== Scouting report ==
Ohlendorf relies on a sinking fastball thrown at 89-92 MPH, along with a low 80's slider and a changeup. Beginning in 2013, he switched to an "old school" windup where the hands are separated (the ball remains in his glove, set where he can quickly grip the ball) before coming back together.

== Personal life ==
Ohlendorf's brother Chad also attended Princeton and pitched for the school.

After the 2006 season, Ohlendorf became an intern for the University of Texas System's Office of Finance. Following the 2009 season, he began an eight-week internship for the U.S. Department of Agriculture.

In 2010, Ohlendorf was chosen as the third-smartest athlete in sports by the Sporting News, behind baseball pitcher Craig Breslow and football player Myron Rolle.
