= José Tábata =

Venezuelan baseball player (born 1988)

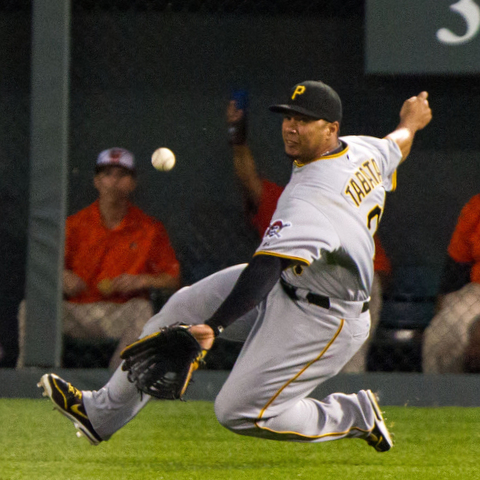
- Tabata with the Pittsburgh Pirates

Vaqueros de Montería
- Outfielder / Manager
- Born: 12 August 1988 (age 38); Anzoátegui, Venezuela
- Batted: Right Threw: Right

MLB debut
- June 9, 2010, for the Pittsburgh Pirates

Last MLB appearance
- June 25, 2015, for the Pittsburgh Pirates

MLB statistics
- Batting average: .275
- Home runs: 17
- Runs batted in: 126
- Stats at Baseball Reference

Teams
- Pittsburgh Pirates (2010–2015)

José Nicolas Tábata (born 12 August 1988) is a Venezuelan former professional baseball outfielder who currently serves as the manager for the Vaqueros de Montería of the Colombian Professional Baseball League (LPB). He was an international signee of the New York Yankees in 2005, and by 2008, became the Yankees' No. 2 prospect. He played in Major League Baseball (MLB) for the Pittsburgh Pirates from 2010 through 2015.

== Playing career ==
=== New York Yankees ===
At the age of 17, and in his first year of professional ball, Tábata led the Yankees farm system in batting average when he hit .314 for the Gulf Coast Yankees in 2005.

In 2006, Tábata batted .298 for the Low A Charleston RiverDogs. The same year, he was selected to participate in the XM Satellite Radio All-Star Futures Game as a member of the World Team, which consisted of 25 highly touted prospects from across the globe. In the game, which was part of the festivities for the 2006 All-Star Game at PNC Park in Pittsburgh, Pennsylvania, he played center field while going 1-for-3 with a single off fellow Yankees prospect Phil Hughes.

In 2007, Tábata played for the Single-A Tampa Yankees.

=== Pittsburgh Pirates ===
On 26 July 2008, Tábata was acquired by the Pirates with Ross Ohlendorf, Jeff Karstens, and Daniel McCutchen from the Yankees in exchange for Xavier Nady and Dámaso Marte.

Tábata was called up from the Triple-A Indianapolis Indians to make his major league debut on 9 June 2010. He subsequently singled for his first major league hit in his first at bat. In the top of the fourth, with Neil Walker at bat, Tábata collected the first stolen base of his career. He then tallied his first run of his career, on a single from Walker on the next pitch.

In 2010, he batted .299, and led National League left fielders in range factor/game (2.09). He tied for 8th in the voting for NL Rookie of the Year, behind Ike Davis of the New York Mets.

On 21 August 2011, Pirates general manager Neal Huntington announced a contract extension for Tábata through 2019. Tábata signed with the Pirates through 2016 for $14.75 million guaranteed, with a $250,000 buyout, and an additional three club option years for 2017–2019. On 2 July 2012, Tábata was sent down to the Triple–A Indianapolis. Tábata was recalled on 19 August, when Starling Marte was placed on the disabled list. Tábata started the 2013 season off well. On 25 May 2013, Tábata was placed on the 15-day disabled list with an oblique strain and didn't return until early July. He was batting .272, with two home runs, six RBI, and a .744 OPS in just 36 games with the Pirates. Tábata finished up the 2013 season with 6 homers, a career best.

On 24 June 2014, Tábata was removed from the 40–man roster and sent outright to Triple–A Indianapolis. Tábata was re-added to the roster on 25 August. He was later designated for assignment on 3 October. Tábata was called back up by the Pirates on 19 May 2015.

On 20 June 2015, Tábata faced Max Scherzer in the ninth inning, after Scherzer had retired the first 26 batters in order for the Washington Nationals. On a 2–2 count, a pitch inside clipped Tábata on the elbow guard, ending Scherzer's chance for a perfect game. After Tábata took first base, Scherzer induced a fly ball from the next batter that was caught by Michael A. Taylor, preserving a no-hitter for Scherzer. Tábata faced criticism from numerous baseball fans and analysts after the game for leaning into the pitch, although he said afterward he had expected Scherzer's slider to break back toward the plate. Replays confirmed that Tábata moved his elbow guard down towards the ball. Scherzer did not blame Tábata for breaking up the perfect game, adding, "I probably would have done the same thing."

=== Los Angeles Dodgers ===
On 31 July 2015, Tábata was traded to the Los Angeles Dodgers in exchange for Michael Morse. He was assigned to the Triple–A Oklahoma City Dodgers, where he hit .225 in 28 games in 2015 and .244 in 30 games in 2016. Tábata was released by the Dodgers on 11 June 2016.

=== Tigres de Quintana Roo ===
On 30 June 2016, Tábata signed with the Tigres de Quintana Roo of the Mexican Baseball League. In 30 games for Quintana Roo, he hit .320/.439/.410 with one home run and nine RBI.

=== Toronto Blue Jays ===
Tábata signed a minor league contract with the Toronto Blue Jays on 10 February 2017. He spent the entire 2017 season on the disabled list with the Buffalo Bisons, and elected free agency on 7 November.

=== York Revolution ===
On 21 February 2018, Tábata signed with the York Revolution of the Atlantic League of Professional Baseball. In 7 games for York, he went 4–for–24 (.167) with one home run, three RBI, and one stolen base. Tábata was released by the Revolution on 8 June.

=== Guerreros de Oaxaca ===
On 3 July 2018, Tábata signed with the Guerreros de Oaxaca of the Mexican League. In 6 games for Oaxaca, he went 3–for–23 (.130) with no home runs and two RBI. Tábata was released the Guerreros on 10 July.

=== West Virginia Power ===
On 26 May 2021, Tábata signed with the West Virginia Power of the Atlantic League of Professional Baseball. In 29 games, he slashed .354/.433/.585 with four home runs and 18 RBI.

=== Sultanes de Monterrey ===
On 8 July 2021, Tábata's contract was purchased by the Sultanes de Monterrey of the Mexican League. In 11 games, he slashed .387/.486/.710 with two home runs and four RBI. Tábata was released on 4 August.

== Coaching career ==
On October 2, 2025, Tábata was hired to serve as the manager for the Vaqueros de Montería of the Colombian Professional Baseball League.

== Personal life ==
On 23 March 2009, Tábata's wife, Amalia Tábata Pereira, who is 23 years his senior, was arrested and charged with abduction after allegedly kidnapping a two-month-old girl in Florida by posing as an immigration officer; the baby was found unharmed in a shopping center later the same day. Tábata told the media that Pereira, whom he married in January 2008, had told him that she had given birth and that the baby was his. She also lied to him about her age, identity, and criminal background. Tábata Pereira was sentenced to 24 years in prison. The couple had been estranged, with Tábata filing for divorce in early 2010.

Tábata married his second wife, Auromar, in early 2011, and the couple have a daughter, Barbara (born 29 September 2011).

== See also ==
- List of Major League Baseball players from Venezuela
