= Stetson Allie =

American baseball pitcher (born 1991)

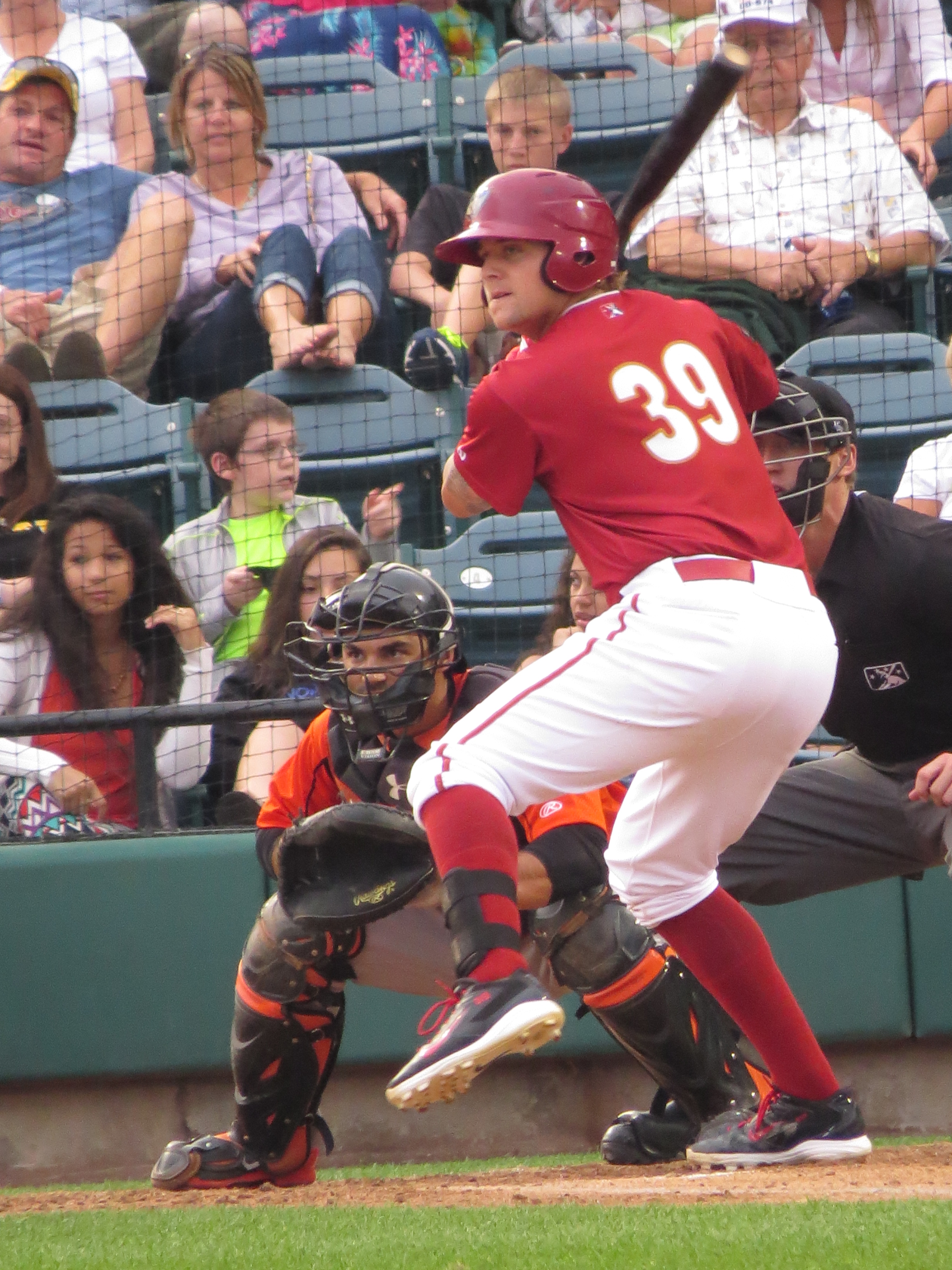
- Allie (right) with the State College Spikes in 2014
- Pitcher / Outfielder
- Born: March 13, 1991 (age 34); Orlando, Florida, U.S.
- Bats: Right Throws: Right
- Stats at Baseball Reference

Stetson Thomas Allie (born March 13, 1991) is an American former professional baseball player. Allie was drafted by the Pittsburgh Pirates in the 2nd round of the 2010 Major League Baseball draft.

== Career ==
=== Pittsburgh Pirates ===
Allie attended St. Edward High School in Lakewood, Ohio, where he played for the school's baseball team. Allie fell in the 2010 Major League Baseball draft due to his high bonus demands and commitment to the University of North Carolina. However, the Pittsburgh Pirates selected Allie, a pitcher who had thrown as high as 100 MPH (102 MPH unofficially), in the second round of the draft and signed him for a $2,250,000 signing bonus.

As a pitcher, he was named the #79 prospect in baseball by Baseball America prior to the 2011 season. However, in 2011, with the Low–A State College Spikes, he walked 29 batters in 26 innings, and in 2012, with the West Virginia Power, he walked 8 batters in 2/3 of an inning. Allie's severe control problems caused the Pirates to convert Allie into an infielder in June 2012.

In June 2012, Allie started his career as a position player with the Gulf Coast League Pirates. Playing for the West Virginia Power of the Single–A South Atlantic League in 2013, he hit six home runs in the first 14 games of the season. He was promoted to the Bradenton Marauders of the High–A Florida State League, and began the 2014 season with the Altoona Curve of the Double–A Eastern League.

In 2016, Allie again returned to Altoona, playing in 111 games and hitting .247/.324/.444 with 16 home runs and 63 RBI. He elected free agency following the season on November 7, 2016.

=== Los Angeles Dodgers ===
On November 14, 2016, Allie signed a minor league contract with the Los Angeles Dodgers, who assigned him to the Double–A Tulsa Drillers of the Texas League to start the 2017 season. In 32 games for the Drillers, he hit only .216. The decision was then made to convert him back to pitching. He pitched in 11 games in the Dodgers system after that (eight for the rookie level Arizona League Dodgers, two for the Rancho Cucamonga Quakes and one for the Oklahoma City Dodgers) and did not allow an earned run in 11 innings over that period.

In 2018, Allie pitched in 22 games for the Quakes, 11 for the Drillers and 13 for the Oklahoma City Dodgers, with a 7–1 record and 5.57 ERA. He split the 2019 campaign between Tulsa and Oklahoma City, accumulating an 8.54 ERA with 50 strikeouts and 2 saves across 41 total appearances. Allie elected free agency following the season on November 4, 2019.

=== Boston Red Sox ===
On February 13, 2020, Allie signed a minor league contract with the Boston Red Sox. Allie did not play in a game in 2020 due to the cancellation of the minor league season because of the COVID-19 pandemic. He became a minor league free agent on November 2.

=== Tampa Bay Rays ===
On December 24, 2020, Allie signed with the Kansas City T-Bones, who later rebranded as the Kansas City Monarchs of the American Association of Professional Baseball. On February 10, 2021, Allie signed a minor league contract with the Tampa Bay Rays organization that included an invitation to Spring Training. Allie struggled to an 8.00 ERA between the Triple-A Durham Bulls and rookie-level Florida Complex League Rays before being released by the organization on August 4.
