= Daniel McCutchen =

American baseball player (born 1982)

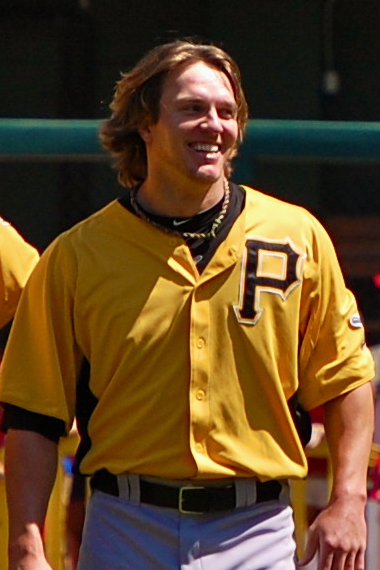
- McCutchen with the Pittsburgh Pirates in 2011
- Pitcher
- Born: September 26, 1982 (age 44); McKinney, Texas, U.S.
- Batted: Right Threw: Right

MLB debut
- August 31, 2009, for the Pittsburgh Pirates

Last MLB appearance
- April 4, 2014, for the Texas Rangers

MLB statistics
- Win–loss record: 8–11
- Earned run average: 4.81
- Strikeouts: 104
- Stats at Baseball Reference

Teams
- Pittsburgh Pirates (2009–2012); Texas Rangers (2014)

Daniel Thomas McCutchen (born September 26, 1982) is an American former professional baseball pitcher. He played in Major League Baseball (MLB) for the Pittsburgh Pirates and the Texas Rangers.

== Amateur career ==
McCutchen attended Norman High School in Norman, Oklahoma. He then attended the University of Central Oklahoma and Grayson County College before being selected by the New York Yankees in the 13th round of the 2006 Major League Baseball draft. However, McCutchen chose to attend the University of Oklahoma. His first appearance for Oklahoma was February 21, 2004, against Southeast Missouri State University. He was drafted by the Tampa Bay Devil Rays in the 29th round of the 2004 Major League Baseball draft, but did not sign.

In 2005, McCutchen pitched 84 innings and led the Sooners with 84 strikeouts. He was drafted by the St. Louis Cardinals in the 12th round of the 2005 Major League Baseball draft, but did not sign. He pitched for the Yarmouth–Dennis Red Sox of the Cape Cod League in 2004 and 2005. McCutchen pitched 148 2/3 innings for the Sooners in 2006.

== Professional career ==
=== New York Yankees ===
McCutchen was drafted by the New York Yankees in the 13th round (404th overall) of the 2006 Major League Baseball draft. On July 26, 2008, McCutchen was traded to the Pittsburgh Pirates with Ross Ohlendorf, Jeff Karstens, and José Tábata from the Yankees in exchange for Xavier Nady and Dámaso Marte.

=== Pittsburgh Pirates ===
McCutchen was called up to the Pirates to make his major league debut on Monday, August 31, 2009. In his debut he pitched 6 innings and gave up 3 earned runs while striking out 5 and walking 2. On the second pitch of his career, he gave up a home run to Drew Stubbs. In his first Major League at-bat, McCutchen hit an RBI single off Cincinnati Reds pitcher Kip Wells. He spent the vast majority of the 2009 season with the Indianapolis Indians, but in 2010, McCutchen began the season in the Pirates' starting rotation, beating out fellow righty, Kevin Hart. In August 2010, McCutchen was moved to the bullpen for the Pirates. In February 2012, McCutchen switched to uniform number 25, as his old number, 34, was traded to starter A. J. Burnett, in exchange for Burnett setting up a college fund for his daughter. In November 2012, McCutchen elected free agency.

=== Baltimore Orioles ===
In November 2012, McCutchen signed with the Baltimore Orioles. On April 6, 2013, it was announced that McCutchen was suspended for violating the league's drug policy. He tested positive for the steroids Methenolone and a metabolite of Trenbolone.

=== Texas Rangers ===
On December 19, 2013, McCutchen signed a minor league contract with the Texas Rangers. He was designated for assignment on April 14.

=== Chicago White Sox ===
On June 26, 2014, the Chicago White Sox signed McCutchen to a minor league contract, and assigned him to the Triple-A Charlotte Knights.

=== San Diego Padres ===
On January 14, 2015, McCutchen signed a minor league contract with the San Diego Padres organization. He made 32 appearances (22 starts) for the Triple–A El Paso Chihuahuas, logging a 9–8 record and 3.60 ERA with 86 strikeouts across 132 1/3 innings pitched.

McCutchen split the 2016 campaign between El Paso and the Double–A San Antonio Missions, accumulating an 11–11 record and 6.23 ERA with 87 strikeouts over 29 games (28 starts). He elected free agency following the season on November 7, 2016.

After his playing career ended, McCutchen opened a car wash in New Braunfels, Texas.
