= Jeff Clement =

American baseball player (born 1983)

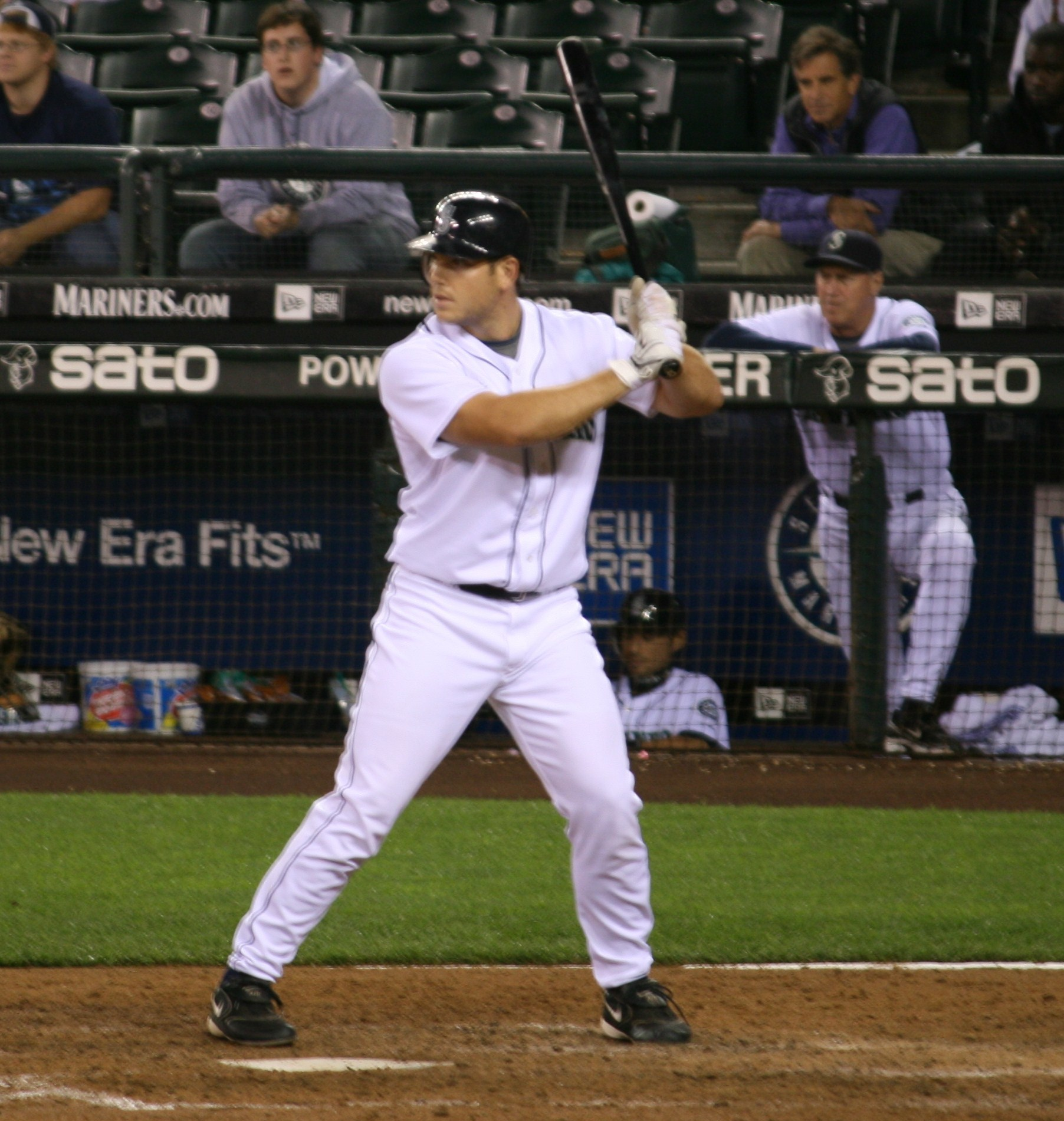
- Clement with the Seattle Mariners
- Catcher / First basemen
- Born: August 21, 1983 (age 42); Marshalltown, Iowa, U.S.
- Batted: Left Threw: Right

MLB debut
- September 4, 2007, for the Seattle Mariners

Last MLB appearance
- September 28, 2012, for the Pittsburgh Pirates

MLB statistics
- Batting average: .218
- Home runs: 14
- Runs batted in: 39
- Stats at Baseball Reference

Teams
- Seattle Mariners (2007–2008); Pittsburgh Pirates (2010, 2012)
Medals
Men's baseball
Representing United States
Pan American Games
Silver medal – second place	2003 Santo Domingo	Team competition
World University Baseball Championship
Gold medal – first place	2004 Tainan	National team

Jeffrey Burton Clement (born August 21, 1983) is an American former professional baseball player. Clement was a catcher and first baseman. He played in Major League Baseball (MLB) for the Seattle Mariners and Pittsburgh Pirates.

Clement attended the University of Southern California (USC), where he played college baseball for the USC Trojans and won the Johnny Bench Award as the nation's top collegiate catcher. The Mariners selected Clement in the first round (third overall) in the 2005 MLB draft. He struggled with injuries, which limited his playing career.

== Amateur career ==
Clement was born and raised in Marshalltown, Iowa. As a twelve-year-old, Clement led the 1996 Marshalltown team to the Little League World Series.

At Marshalltown High School, he broke the national high school home run record, formerly held by Drew Henson. He finished his high school career with 75 home runs. Clement led his high school team as a catcher/pitcher to the Iowa 4-A State Championship game in his senior year (2002). Clement was featured in the September 16, 2002, issue of Sports Illustrated as part of the "For the Love of the Game" article. Out of high school, Clement was drafted in the 12th round by the Minnesota Twins (362nd overall) due to a poor performance at a pre-draft showcase, but did not sign.

Clement then went to University of Southern California and also played on the U.S. National Team. In his freshman year, he was named Collegiate Baseball Freshman National Co-Player of the Year, Pac-10 Conference Freshman of the Year, earned Baseball America Freshman All-America first team, and Collegiate Baseball Freshman All-American first team honors.

As a sophomore, Clement earned 2004 Baseball America Preseason All-America first team and NCBWA Preseason All-America first team honors, as well as Collegiate Baseball Preseason All-America second team honors. He was also named as a semifinalist for the Johnny Bench Award.

In 2005, he won the Johnny Bench Award as the nation's top collegiate catcher, earned 2005 Baseball America All-America First Team, USA Today Sports Weekly All-America first team and Collegiate Baseball All-America first team honors, as well as 2005 National Collegiate Baseball Writers Association All-America third team honors and was a Finalist for the 2005 Golden Spikes Award and named All-Pac-10 for the third straight year.

== Professional career ==
=== Seattle Mariners ===
He made his MLB debut on September 4, 2007, and ended up appearing in nine games for the season, registering 16 at-bats.

On April 30, 2008, Clement was called up for his second stint in the MLB by the Mariners. He went 1-for-1 in a pinch hit appearance against the Cleveland Indians. With catcher Kenji Johjima signed to a large contract, Clement spent 2008 playing both catcher and designated hitter.

He was optioned to the Triple-A Tacoma Rainiers late in Spring Training 2009.

On July 29, 2009, the Seattle Mariners sent Clement, along with Ronny Cedeño, Nate Adcock, Brett Lorin, and Aaron Pribanic to the Pittsburgh Pirates, in exchange for Jack Wilson and Ian Snell. Clement was immediately optioned to the Triple-A Indianapolis Indians.

=== Pittsburgh Pirates ===
He entered 2010 spring training competing for the job of starting first baseman with Steve Pearce and Garrett Jones. In 2010, Clement played 54 games for the Pirates, hitting .201 with 7 home runs. Clement was placed on the disabled list in August 2010 with left knee irritation, ending his season. He was outrighted off the 40-man roster in November 2010. Clement had knee surgery in the offseason, and missed all of 2011 spring training. He started a rehab assignment in the Gulf Coast League on July 21, 2011. Clement became a free agent after the 2011 season. In December 2011, he re-signed with the Pirates on a minor league deal. On June 2, 2012, Clement hit for the cycle in a minor league game, while playing for the Indianapolis Indians. On August 24, 2012, Clement was promoted to the majors. On August 31, 2012, Clement was outrighted to the minors, but was called up again on September 3. He was designated for assignment on October 25, 2012. In November 2012, Clement elected free agency.

=== Minnesota Twins ===
Clement signed with the Minnesota Twins in November 2012. He announced his retirement from baseball on March 31, 2014.
