= Argenis Díaz =

Venezuelan baseball player (born 1987)

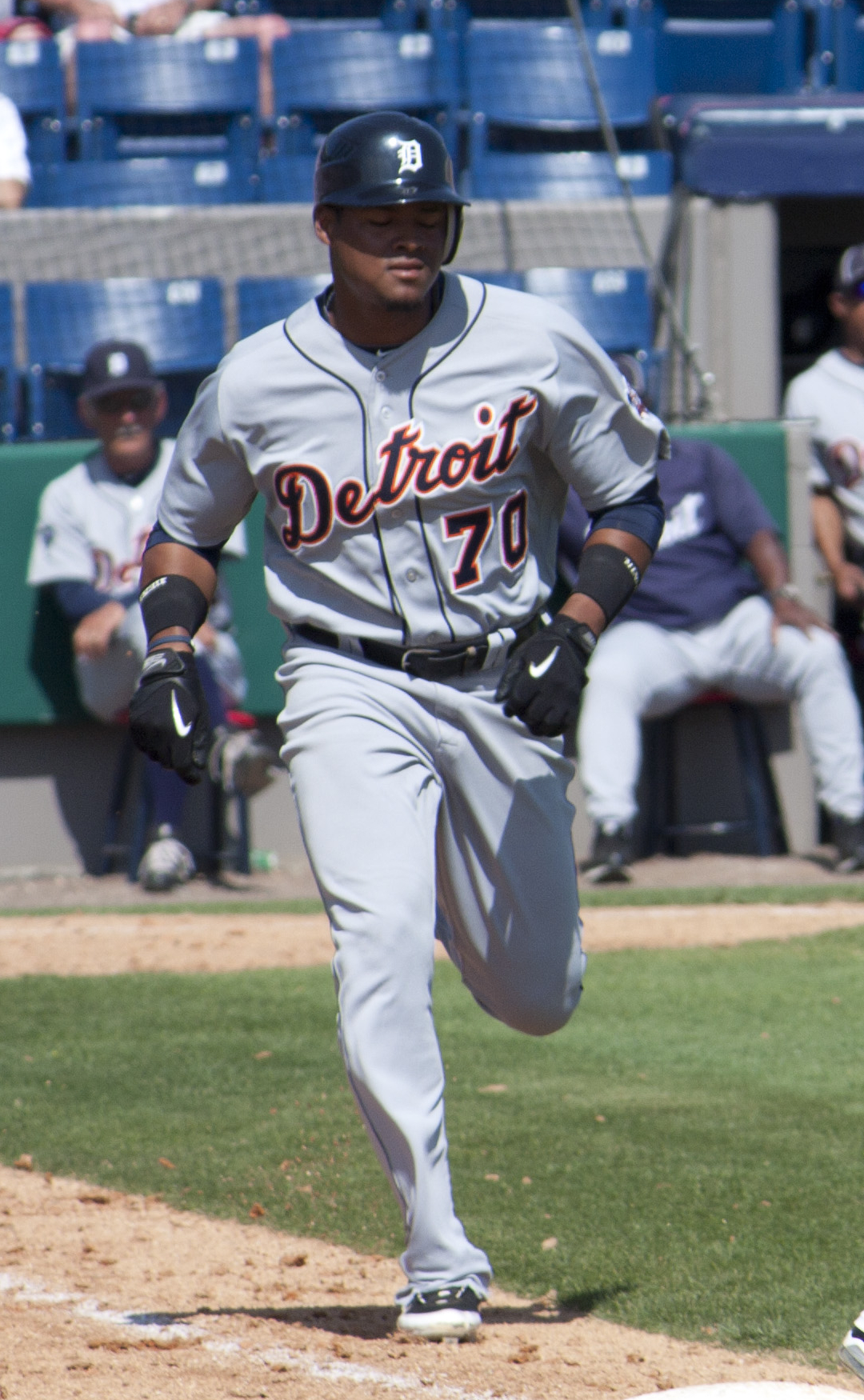
- Diaz with the Detroit Tigers
- Shortstop
- Born: February 12, 1987 (age 39); Guatire, Venezuela
- Batted: Right Threw: Right

MLB debut
- April 21, 2010, for the Pittsburgh Pirates

Last appearance
- September 30, 2010, for the Pittsburgh Pirates

MLB statistics
- Batting average: .242
- Home runs: 0
- Runs batted in: 2
- Stats at Baseball Reference

Teams
- Pittsburgh Pirates (2010)

Argenis Díaz (born February 12, 1987) is a Venezuelan former professional baseball shortstop. He played in Major League Baseball (MLB) for the Pittsburgh Pirates in 2010.

== Playing career ==
=== Boston Red Sox ===
Díaz was signed by the Boston Red Sox organization in July 2003 as an international free agent. He started his professional career by playing with the Venezuelan Summer League Red Sox in 2004 and 2005 (the latter year's team being a cooperative with the San Diego Padres). He played for the Gulf Coast League Red Sox in 2006.

In 2007, Díaz played for Single-A Greenville Drive, batting .279 with two home runs and 40 runs batted in (RBI) in 99 games. He spent 2008 with the Lancaster JetHawks of Class A-Advanced and the Portland Sea Dogs of Double-A, batting a combined .284 with two home runs and 52 RBI in 110 games. Díaz returned to Portland in 2009, appearing in 76 games through July, compiling a .253 average with 24 RBI.

=== Pittsburgh Pirates ===
On July 22, 2009, Díaz was traded along with Hunter Strickland to the Pittsburgh Pirates in exchange for first baseman Adam LaRoche. With Pittsburgh's Triple-A team, the Indianapolis Indians, Díaz appeared in 43 games through the end of the season, batting .233 with eight RBI.

On April 22, 2010, Díaz made his major league debut for the Pirates; he went 0-for-1 with a groundout as a pinch hitter in the 9th inning against the Milwaukee Brewers. With the 2010 Pirates, Díaz appeared in 22 MLB games, batting .242 with two RBI. Defensively, he played 15 games at shortstop and had a .971 fielding percentage. Díaz also played in 80 Triple-A games with Indianapolis, batting .248 with 22 RBI.

=== Detroit Tigers ===
Díaz signed as a minor league free agent with the Detroit Tigers on December 20, 2010. He played in Triple-A with the Toledo Mud Hens for the 2011, 2012, and 2013 seasons.

=== Cincinnati Reds ===
Díaz signed a minor league deal with the Cincinnati Reds on December 2, 2013. He played with the Triple-A Louisville Bats until his release by the Reds on June 18, 2014.

=== Arizona Diamondbacks ===
On June 21, 2014, Díaz signed a minor league contract with the Arizona Diamondbacks. He finished the season with the Triple-A Reno Aces and Double-A Mobile Bay Bears. Díaz elected free agency on November 6, 2015.

=== Detroit Tigers (second stint) ===
On January 20, 2016, the Detroit Tigers signed Díaz to a minor league contract. He spent the 2016 season with Toledo, and split time during 2017 with Toledo and the Double-A Erie SeaWolves. Díaz was released on August 12, 2017.

Díaz played a total of 14 minor-league seasons from 2004 to 2017, appearing in at least 1226 minor-league games (statistics from his first season in the Venezuelan Summer League are not available).

== Coaching career ==
On January 23, 2020, Díaz was named a coach for the Indianapolis Indians, the Triple-A affiliate of the Pittsburgh Pirates.

== See also ==
- List of Major League Baseball players from Venezuela
