= 2008 Pittsburgh Pirates season =

2008 Pittsburgh Pirates
- League: National League
- Division: Central
- Ballpark: PNC Park
- City: Pittsburgh, Pennsylvania
- Record: 67–95 (.414)
- Divisional place: 6th
- Owners: Bob Nutting
- General managers: Neal Huntington
- Managers: John Russell
- Television: FSN Pittsburgh
- Radio: WPGB-FM (Steve Blass, Greg Brown, Lanny Frattare, Bob Walk, John Wehner)

The 2008 Pittsburgh Pirates season was the 127th season of the franchise; the 122nd in the National League. This was their eighth season at PNC Park. It was the first under new president Frank Coonelly, general manager Neal Huntington, and manager John Russell. Unable to improve on their 68–94, last place finish during the 2007 season, the Pirates had not had a winning record or made it to the playoffs since 1992, and finished 67–95 for their 16th straight losing season. The season was the final of play-by-play announcer Lanny Frattare, whose 33-year tenure as Pirates' broadcaster was the longest in franchise history.

== Regular season ==
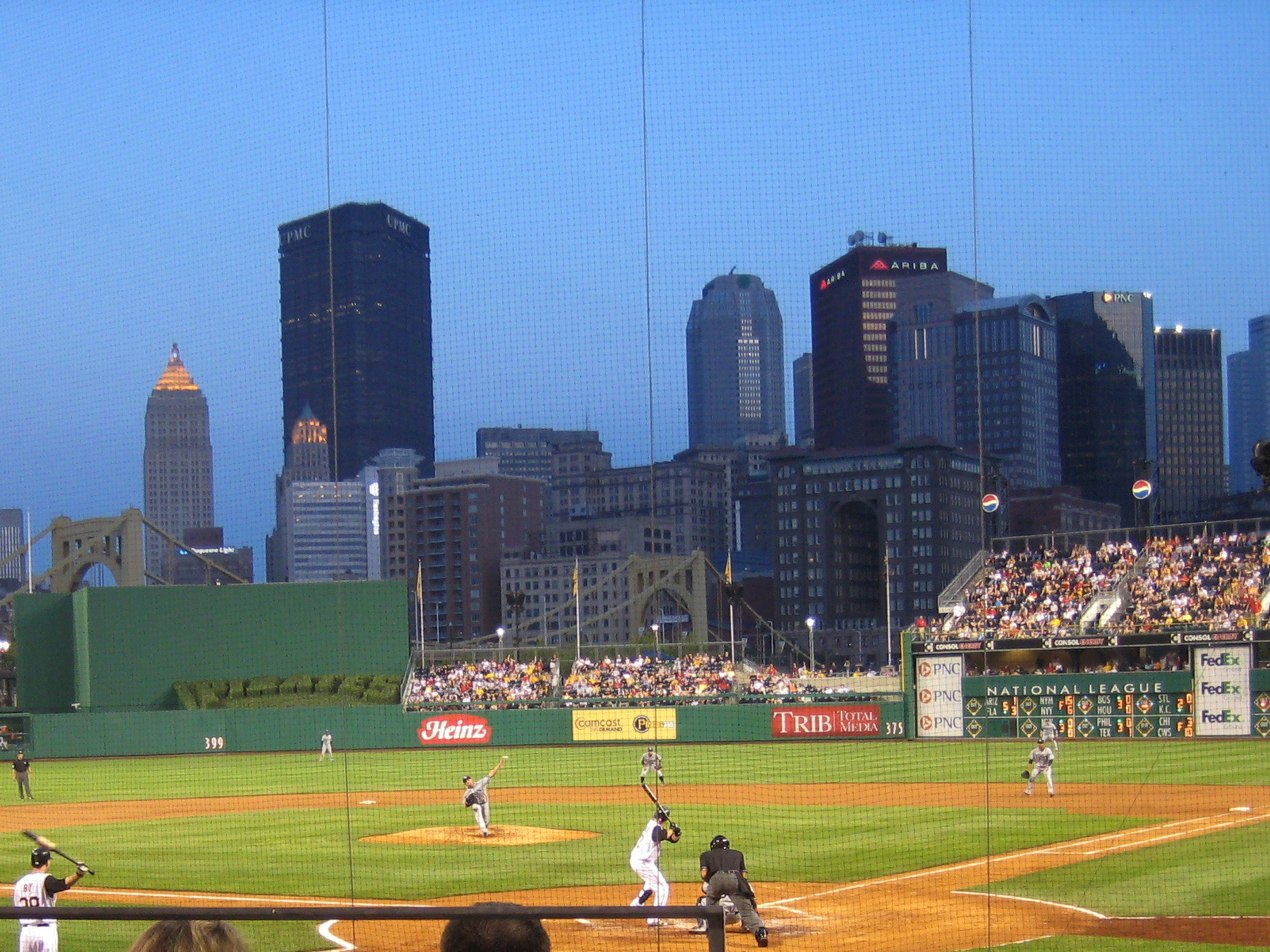
The Pirates play the Tampa Bay Rays at PNC Park

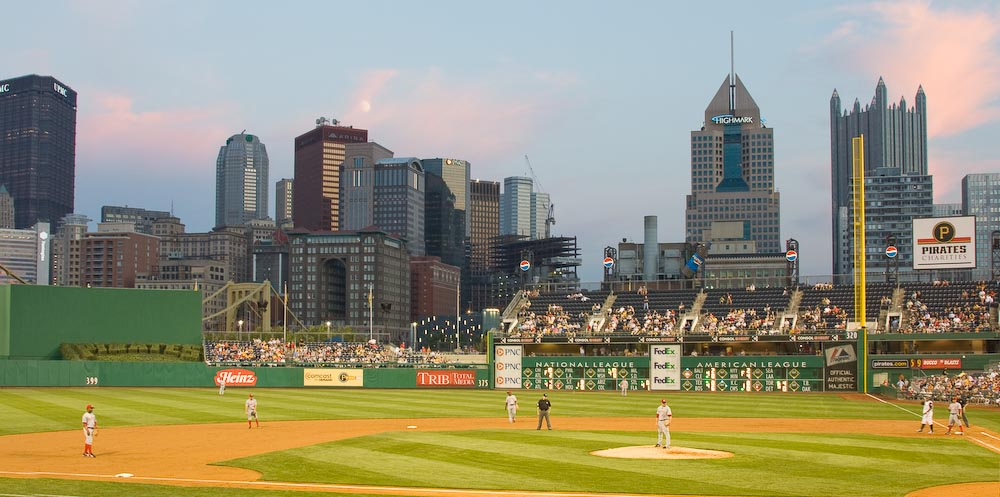
Pirates play the Cincinnati Reds at an evening game in August 2008

On November 5, 2007, John Russell was introduced as the Pirates manager, replacing Jim Tracy. Team management cited three areas that the franchise hoped to improve: "refocused emphasis on fundamentals", holding players to a higher standard, and signing younger players. The Pirates won their season opener against the Atlanta Braves, by the score of 12–11, in 12 innings. The Pirates played their home opener against the division-rival Chicago Cubs on April 7, losing 10–8, also in 12 innings. The Pirates started out the season with a 7–7 record after the first half-month; however, after a five-game losing streak they began to struggle, finishing out April with an 11–16 record. The Pirates losing continued as they dropped three of four to the Washington Nationals to begin May. The team fought back, winning six straight games—the most consecutive since 2004, to bring their record within one victory of a .500 record. Throughout the remainder of May the team struggled, but never fell more than four games under .500. Throughout the early months of the season closer Matt Capps was perfect, getting saves in 15 consecutive opportunities. However, on June 10, Capps gave up a two-run home run to the Nationals, losing his first decision of the season. In addition, Capps would blow saves in two of his next three appearances; however, he achieved his first win of the season after an extra-inning victory over the Baltimore Orioles.

Pittsburgh went 6–9 in interleague play, including two wins against the New York Yankees who returned to Pittsburgh for the first time since the 1960 World Series. On July 12, in a game against the St. Louis Cardinals, the Pirates came back to win a game that they trailed by six runs in the seventh inning. It was only the second time in the past 25 years that the Pirates won at home after scoring runs in the seventh, eighth, ninth, and extra innings. The Pirates finished out the remainder of July with a 6–9 record—50–58 overall. On the final day of July, the Pirates made a deal with the Yankees to send outfielder Xavier Nady and pitcher Dámaso Marte in return for Jeff Karstens, Daniel McCutchen, Ross Ohlendorf and José Tábata. Later in the day the team became involved in a three-team deal in which the Pirates sent Jason Bay to the Boston Red Sox in return for four players from the Los Angeles Dodgers. The Pirates won seven of the first 18 games in August before dropping ten consecutive games to close out the month. Pittsburgh entered the final month of the season 21 games below the .500 mark. On September 7, the Pirates lost their 82nd game of the season, tying them with the Philadelphia Phillies as the only two franchises in professional sports history to have losing records in 16 consecutive seasons. The Pirates concluded their season on September 28 with a victory against the San Diego Padres. The team became the second in the Pirates' 122-year history to have no pitchers to win 10 games. The performance of the pitchers lead the team to fire pitching coach Jeff Andrews after the season.

=== Standings ===
NL Central
Team	W	L	Pct.	GB	Home	Road
Chicago Cubs	97	64	.602	—	55‍–‍26	42‍–‍38
Milwaukee Brewers	90	72	.556	7½	49‍–‍32	41‍–‍40
Houston Astros	86	75	.534	11	47‍–‍33	39‍–‍42
St. Louis Cardinals	86	76	.531	11½	46‍–‍35	40‍–‍41
Cincinnati Reds	74	88	.457	23½	43‍–‍38	31‍–‍50
Pittsburgh Pirates	67	95	.414	30½	39‍–‍42	28‍–‍53

=== Game log ===
2008 Game Log (67–95)
March (1–0)

#	Date	Opponent	Score	Win	Loss	Save	Attendance	Record
1	March 31	@ Braves	12–11 (12)	**Osoria** (1–0)	Boyer (0–1)	—	45,269	1–0

April (10–16)

#	Date	Opponent	Score	Win	Loss	Save	Attendance	Record
2	April 2	@ Braves	2–10	Jurrjens (1–0)	**Gorzelanny** (0–1)	—	17,893	1–1
3	April 3	@ Braves	4–3 (10)	**Yates** (1–0)	Resop (0–1)	**Capps** (1)	19,240	2–1
4	April 4	@ Marlins	4–5	Gregg (1–0)	**Osoria** (1–1)	—	10,089	2–2
5	April 5	@ Marlins	3–7	Hendrickson (1–1)	**Maholm** (0–1)	—	15,752	2–3
6	April 6	@ Marlins	9–2	**Snell** (1–0)	VandenHurk (0–1)	—	10,431	3–3
7	April 7	Cubs	8–10 (12)	Lieber (1–1)	**Meek** (0–1)	Mármol (1)	37,491	3–4
8	April 9	Cubs	4–6 (15)	Hart (2–0)	**Dumatrait** (0–1)	Marshall (1)	9,735	3–5
9	April 10	Cubs	3–7	Lieber (2–1)	**Morris** (0–1)	—	9,798	3–6
10	April 11	Reds	1–0	**Grabow** (1–0)	Burton (0–1)	**Capps** (2)	13,603	4–6
11	April 12	Reds	4–3	**Snell** (2–0)	Lincoln (0–1)	**Capps** (3)	18,096	5–6
12	April 13	Reds	9–1	**Gorzelanny** (1–1)	Cueto (1–1)	—	11,201	6–6
13	April 14	@ Dodgers	6–4	**Yates** (2–0)	Saito (1–1)	**Capps** (4)	37,334	7–6
14	April 15	@ Dodgers	2–11	Loaiza (1–2)	**Morris** (0–2)	—	37,896	7–7
15	April 16	@ Dodgers	1–8	Penny (2–2)	**Maholm** (0–2)	—	53,629	7–8
16	April 18	@ Cubs	2–3	Hill (1–0)	**Snell** (2–1)	Wood (4)	39,118	7–9
17	April 19	@ Cubs	1–13	Marquis (1–0)	**Gorzelanny** (1–2)	—	40,298	7–10
18	April 20	@ Cubs	6–13	Dempster (3–0)	**Duke** (0–1)	—	41,405	7–11
19	April 21	Marlins	4–10	Hendrickson (4–1)	**Morris** (0–3)	—	8,444	7–12
20	April 22	Marlins	3–2	**Maholm** (1–2)	Nolasco (1–2)	**Capps** (5)	10,185	8–12
21	April 23	Cardinals	7–4	**Marte** (1–0)	Reyes (1–1)	**Capps** (6)	10,487	9–12
22	April 24	Cardinals	2–6	Piñeiro (1–2)	**Gorzelanny** (1–3)	Isringhausen (7)	9,544	9–13
23	April 25	Phillies	5–6	Gordon (2–2)	**Duke** (0–2)	Lidge (6)	23,930	9–14
24	April 26	Phillies	4–8	Kendrick (2–2)	**Morris** (0–4)	—	24,791	9–15
25	April 27	Phillies	5–1	**Maholm** (2–2)	Myers (2–2)	—	17,588	10–15
—	April 28	@ Mets	Postponed rain (Rescheduled for August 11)					
26	April 29	@ Mets	4–5 (11)	Sosa (3–1)	**Van Benschoten** (0–1)	—	46,982	10–16
27	April 30	@ Mets	13–1	**Gorzelanny** (2–3)	Pérez (2–2)	—	46,788	11–16

May (15–13)

#	Date	Opponent	Score	Win	Loss	Save	Attendance	Record
28	May 1	@ Nationals	2–3	Ayala (1–1)	**Grabow** (1–1)	Rauch (6)	24,723	11–17
29	May 2	@ Nationals	11–4	**Marte** (2–0)	Lannan (2–3)	—	26,001	12–17
30	May 3	@ Nationals	8–9	Colomé (1–1)	**Maholm** (2–3)	Rauch (7)	34,128	12–18
31	May 4	@ Nationals	2–5	Redding (4–2)	**Snell** (2–2)	—	30,564	12–19
32	May 6	Giants	12–6	**Duke** (1–2)	Sánchez (2–2)	—	12,030	13–19
33	May 7	Giants	3–1	**Dumatrait** (1–1)	Zito (0–7)	**Capps** (7)	9,788	14–19
34	May 8	Giants	5–4	**Osoria** (2–1)	Cain (1–3)	**Capps** (8)	16,816	15–19
35	May 9	Braves	3–2	**Grabow** (2–1)	Bennett (0–2)	—	21,050	16–19
36	May 10	Braves	5–2	**Gorzelanny** (3–3)	James (2–2)	**Capps** (9)	28,141	17–19
—	May 11	Braves	Postponed rain (Rescheduled for May 12)					
37	May 12	Braves	5–0	**Duke** (2–2)	Jurrjens (4–3)	—		18–19
38	May 12	Braves	1–8	Hudson (6–2)	**Van Benschoten** (0–1)	—	16,669	18–20
39	May 13	@ Cardinals	8–4 (10)	**Salas** (1–0)	Villone (1–1)	—	38,800	19–20
40	May 14	@ Cardinals	1–5	Wellemeyer (4–1)	**Maholm** (2–4)	—	38,720	19–21
41	May 15	@ Cardinals	11–5	**Grabow** (3–1)	Isringhausen (1–5)	—	41,244	20–21
42	May 16	@ Cubs	4–7	Gallagher (1–0)	**Gorzelanny** (3–4)	Wood (9)	40,537	20–22
43	May 17	@ Cubs	7–6	**Marte** (3–0)	Mármol (1–1)	**Capps** (10)	41,686	21–22
44	May 18	@ Cubs	3–4	Marquis (2–3)	**Dumatrait** (1–2)	Wood (10)	41,321	21–23
45	May 20	Brewers	2–7	Parra (2–2)	**Maholm** (2–5)	—	11,761	21–24
46	May 21	Brewers	1–4	Sheets (5–1)	**Snell** (2–3)	—	8,805	21–25
47	May 22	Brewers	8–4	**Gorzelanny** (4–4)	Bush (1–5)	—	12,887	22–25
48	May 23	Cubs	3–12	Zambrano (7–1)	**Duke** (2–3)	—	32,656	22–26
49	May 24	Cubs	5–4 (14)	**Grabow** (4–1)	Wuertz (0–1)	—	29,929	23–26
50	May 25	Cubs	6–5 (11)	**Marte** (4–0)	Lieber (2–3)	—	29,415	24–26
51	May 27	@ Reds	6–9	Cueto (3–5)	**Snell** (2–4)	Cordero (11)	17,964	24–27
52	May 28	@ Reds	1–9	Arroyo (4–4)	**Gorzelanny** (4–5)	—	15,797	24–28
53	May 29	@ Reds	7–2	**Dumatrait** (2–2)	Harang (2–7)	—	18,142	25–28
54	May 30	@ Cardinals	4–5	Wellemeyer (6–1)	**Duke** (2–4)	Franklin (5)	42,791	25–29
55	May 31	@ Cardinals	14–4	**Maholm** (3–5)	Parisi (0–2)	—	44,302	26–29

June (12–15)

#	Date	Opponent	Score	Win	Loss	Save	Attendance	Record
56	June 1	@ Cardinals	4–7	Looper (7–4)	**Snell** (2–5)	Franklin (6)	43,462	26–30
57	June 2	@ Cardinals	5–4	**Osoria** (3–1)	Osoria (5–3)	**Capps** (11)	42,129	27–30
58	June 3	Astros	0–2	Rodríguez (2–1)	**Dumatrait** (2–3)	Valverde (16)	13,183	27–31
59	June 4	Astros	5–2	**Duke** (3–4)	Oswalt (4–6)	**Capps** (12)	9,392	28–31
60	June 5	Astros	4–3	**Maholm** (4–5)	Backe (4–7)	**Capps** (13)	10,728	29–31
61	June 6	D-backs	1–3	Webb (11–2)	**Snell** (2–6)	Lyon (13)	19,437	29–32
62	June 7	D-backs	3–4	Cruz (2–0)	**Grabow** (4–2)	Lyon (14)	20,967	29–33
63	June 8	D-backs	6–4	**Dumatrait** (3–3)	Davis (2–3)	**Capps** (14)	22,222	30–33
64	June 9	D-backs	5–3	**Duke** (4–4)	Johnson (4–3)	**Capps** (15)	10,717	31–33
65	June 10	Nationals	6–7	Hanrahan (2–2)	**Capps** (0–1)	Rauch (13)	12,957	31–34
66	June 11	Nationals	3–1	**Snell** (3–6)	Lannan (4–7)	**Capps** (16)	15,439	32–34
67	June 12	Nationals	7–5	**Gorzelanny** (5–5)	Bergmann (1–4)	**Marte** (1)	16,306	33–34
68	June 13	@ Orioles	6–9	Burres (5–5)	**Osoria** (3–2)	Sherrill (22)	47,305	33–35
69	June 14	@ Orioles	7–8	Sherrill (2–1)	**Capps** (0–2)	—	32,432	33–36
70	June 15	@ Orioles	5–4	**Capps** (1–2)	Sherrill (2–2)	—	31,107	34–36
71	June 17	@ White Sox	5–16	Vázquez (7–5)	**Snell** (3–7)	—	28,012	34–37
72	June 18	@ White Sox	2–8	Buehrle (4–6)	**Gorzelanny** (5–6)	—	28,570	34–38
73	June 19	@ White Sox	8–13	Floyd (8–3)	**Dumatrait** (3–4)	—	26,685	34–39
74	June 20	Blue Jays	1–0 (12)	**Yates** (3–0)	Carlson (1–1)	—	28,962	35–39
75	June 21	Blue Jays	6–3	**Maholm** (5–5)	Litsch (7–4)	**Capps** (17)	27,014	36–39
76	June 22	Blue Jays	5–8	McGowan (6–5)	**Beam** (0–1)	Ryan (15)	22,983	36–40
77	June 24	Yankees	12–5	**Gorzelanny** (6–6)	Rasner (4–5)		38,867	37–40
78	June 25	Yankees	0–10	Chamberlain (2–2)	**Duke** (4–5)	—	38,954	37–41
–	June 26	Yankees	Postponed (rain) Rescheduled for July 10					
79	June 27	Rays	5–10	Kazmir (7–3)	**Barthmaier** (0–1)	—	19,970	37–42
80	June 28	Rays	4–3 (13)	**Van Benschoten** (1–2)	Hammel (3–3)	—	17,970	38–42
81	June 29	Rays	3–4	Sonnanstine (9–3)	**Yates** (3–1)	Percival (19)	15,828	38–43
82	June 30	@ Reds	3–4	Cordero (3–1)	**Capps** (1–3)	—	20,745	38–44

July (12–14)

#	Date	Opponent	Score	Win	Loss	Save	Attendance	Record
83	July 1	@ Reds	6–5 (11)	**Capps** (2–3)	Weathers (2–4)	**Sánchez** (1)	19,345	39–44
84	July 2	@ Reds	9–5	**Bautista** (1–1)	Thompson (0–2)	—	16,890	40–44
85	July 4	@ Brewers	1–9	Sheets (10–2)	**Gorzelanny** (6–7)	Villanueva (1)	41,463	40–45
86	July 5	@ Brewers	1–2	Gagné (2–2)	**Yates** (3–2)	—	39,176	40–46
87	July 6	@ Brewers	6–11	Stetter (2–1)	**Bautista** (1–2)	—	42,163	40–47
88	July 7	Astros	10–7	**Bautista** (2–2)	Hernández (0–3)	**Marte** (2)	13,323	41–47
89	July 8	Astros	4–3	**Grabow** (5–2)	Brocail (4–4)	**Marte** (3)	17,867	42–47
90	July 9	Astros	4–6	Moehler (5–4)	**Burnett** (0–1)	Valverde (23)	13,884	42–48
91	July 10	Yankees	4–2	**Maholm** (6–1)	Veras (2–1)	**Marte** (4)	39,081	43–48
92	July 11	Cardinals	0–6	Lohse (11–2)	**Duke** (4–6)	—	37,113	43–49
93	July 12	Cardinals	12–11 (10)	**Bautista** (3–2)	Perez (2–1)	—	29,387	44–49
94	July 13	Cardinals	6–11	Springer (2–0)	**Osoria** (3–3)	—	21,052	44–50
95	July 17	@ Rockies	3–5	Jiménez (5–9)	**Maholm** (6–6)	Fuentes (15)	30,584	44–51
96	July 18	@ Rockies	2–5	Rusch (3–3)	**Snell** (3–8)	Fuentes (16)	37,114	44–52
97	July 19	@ Rockies	1–7	de la Rosa (4–5)	**Herrera** (0–1)	—	44,565	44–53
98	July 20	@ Rockies	3–11	Cook (12–6)	**Duke** (4–7)	—	30,488	44–54
99	July 21	@ Astros	9–3	**Yates** (4–2)	Valverde (4–3)	—	34,624	45–54
100	July 22	@ Astros	8–2	**Maholm** (7–6)	Cassel (1–1)	—	33,996	46–54
101	July 23	@ Astros	8–7	**Osoria** (4–3)	Geary (2–2)	**Marte** (5)	36,091	47–54
102	July 24	Padres	9–1	**Herrera** (1–1)	Hensley (1–1)	—	17,916	48–54
103	July 25	Padres	5–6	Baek (3–5)	**Duke** (4–8)	Hoffman (19)	25,727	48–55
104	July 26	Padres	6–9	Banks (3–4)	**Van Benschoten** (1–3)	Hoffman (20)	27,794	48–56
105	July 27	Padres	1–3	Peavy (8–6)	**Grabow** (5–3)	Hoffman (21)	21,721	48–57
106	July 28	Rockies	8–4	**Snell** (4–8)	Grilli (2–2)	—	15,303	49–57
107	July 29	Rockies	6–4	**Davis** (1–0)	Herges (3–4)	**Yates** (1)	17,507	50–57
108	July 30	Rockies	4–7	Cook (14–6)	**Duke** (4–9)	Fuentes (18)	16,587	50–58

August (7–21)

#	Date	Opponent	Score	Win	Loss	Save	Attendance	Record
109	August 1	@ Cubs	3–0	**Karstens** (1–0)	Marquis (6–7)	**Grabow** (1)	41,340	51–58
110	August 2	@ Cubs	1–5	Lilly (11–6)	**Maholm** (7–7)		41,426	51–59
111	August 3	@ Cubs	5–8	Gaudin (8–4)	**Hansen** (1–4)	Mármol (6)	41,200	51–60
112	August 4	@ D-backs	7–13	Haren (12–5)	**Davis** (1–1)	—	21,826	51–61
113	August 5	@ D-backs	1–3	Webb (16–4)	**Duke** (4–10)	—	25,109	51–62
114	August 6	@ D-backs	2–0	**Karstens** (2–0)	Johnson (9–8)	—	28,556	52–62
115	August 8	@ Phillies	2–0 (12)	**Beam** (1–1)	Walrond (0–1)	**Hansen** (3)	43,891	53–62
116	August 9	@ Phillies	2–4	Myers (5–9)	**Snell** (4–9)	Durbin (1)	45,060	53–63
117	August 10	@ Phillies	3–6	Eyre (3–0)	**Yates** (4–3)	Madson (1)	45,262	53–64
118	August 11	@ Mets	7–5	**Bautista** (4–2)	Heilman (2–7)	**Grabow** (2)	53,534	54–64
119	August 12	Reds	1–5	Vólquez (14–5)	**Karstens** (2–1)	—	23,686	54–65
120	August 13	Reds	5–2	**Maholm** (8–7)	Fogg (2–5)	**Grabow** (3)	15,787	55–65
121	August 14	Reds	1–3	Cueto (8–11)	**Snell** (4–10)	Cordero (23)	35,439	55–66
122	August 15	Mets	1–2	Pelfrey (11–8)	**Davis** (1–2)	Heilman (3)	36,418	55–67
123	August 16	Mets	4–7	Martínez (4–3)	**Duke** (4–11)	Feliciano (2)	37,506	55–68
124	August 17	Mets	0–4	Santana (11–7)	**Karstens** (2–2)	—	36,483	55–69
125	August 18	Mets	5–2	**Burnett** (1–1)	Feliciano (2–3)	**Grabow** (4)	19,066	56–69
126	August 19	@ Cardinals	4–1	**Snell** (5–10)	Looper (11–10)	**Beam** (1)	39,502	57–69
127	August 20	@ Cardinals	2–11	Wellemeyer (11–4)	**Davis** (1–3)	—	37,269	57–70
128	August 22	@ Brewers	4–10	Bush (8–9)	**Duke** (4–12)	—	41,637	57–71
129	August 23	@ Brewers	3–6	Suppan (9–7)	**Gorzelanny** (6–8)	Torres (25)	43,293	57–72
130	August 24	@ Brewers	3–4 (12)	Mota (4–5)	**Davis** (1–4)	—	45,163	57–73
131	August 25	Cubs	3–12	Lilly (13–7)	**Karstens** (2–3)	—	14,454	57–74
132	August 26	Cubs	9–14	Marshall (3–3)	**Hansen** (1–5)	—	17,929	57–75
133	August 27	Cubs	0–2	Marquis (9–7)	**Duke** (4–13)	Wood (27)	15,260	57–76
134	August 29	Brewers	1–3	Bush (9–9)	**Gorzelanny** (6–9)	Torres (26)	18,086	57–77
135	August 30	Brewers	3–11	Suppan (9–7)	**Maholm** (8–8)	—	21,931	57–78
136	August 31	Brewers	0–7	Sabathia (15–8)	**Karstens** (2–4)	—	21,293	57–79

September (10–16)

#	Date	Opponent	Score	Win	Loss	Save	Attendance	Record
137	September 2	@ Reds	3–2	**Snell** (6–10)	Harang (4–15)	**Capps** (18)	18,024	58–79
138	September 3	@ Reds	6–5	**Yates** (5–3)	Affeldt (1–1)	**Capps** (19)	18,561	59–79
139	September 4	@ Reds	6–8	Masset (1–0)	**Hansen** (0–3)	Cordero (27)	20,626	59–80
140	September 5	@ Giants	7–0	**Duke** (5–13)	Correia (3–8)	—	31,133	60–80
141	September 6	@ Giants	6–7	Espineli (2–0)	**Bautista** (4–2)	Wilson (37)	38,094	60–81
142	September 7	@ Giants	6–11	Matos (1–2)	**Karstens** (2–5)	—	34,122	60–82
143	September 8	@ Astros	2–3	Arias (1–0)	**Snell** (6–11)	Valverde (41)	26,526	60–83
144	September 9	@ Astros	3–9	Wolf (10–11)	**Ohlendorf** (1–2)		30,034	60–84
145	September 10	@ Astros	4–7	Moehler (11–6)	**Bautista** (4–4)	Valverde (42)	26,859	60–85
146	September 11	@ Astros	0–6	Oswalt (15–9)	**Zach Duke** (5–14)		31,101	60–86
147	September 12	Cardinals	10–2	**Maholm** (9–8)	Piñeiro (6–6)		14,903	61–86
148	September 13	Cardinals	7–6 (12)	**Hansen** (2–6)	Perez (3–3)		17,132	62–86
149	September 14	Cardinals	7–2	**Beam** (2–1)	Thompson (5–3)		18,994	63–86
150	September 15	Dodgers	2–8	Kuroda (9–10)	**Ohlendorf** (1–3)		13,147	63–87
151	September 16	Dodgers	2–6	Lowe (14–11)	**Karstens** (2–6)		12,741	63–88
152	September 17	Dodgers	15–8	**Grabow** (6–3)	Elbert (0–1)		11,883	64–88
153	September 18	Dodgers	3–4 (12)	Proctor (2–0)	**Hansen** (2–7)	Broxton (14)	12,709	64–89
154	September 19	Astros	1–5	Wolf (11–12)	**Snell** (6–12)		26,301	64–90
155	September 20	Astros	6–4	**Davis** (2–4)	Moehler (11–8)	**Capps** (20)	36,621	65–90
156	September 21	Astros	2–6	Oswalt (16–10)	**Ohlendorf** (1–4)		20,311	65–91
157	September 23	@ Brewers	5–7	Torres (7–5)	**Beam** (2–2)		36,612	65–92
158	September 24	@ Brewers	2–4	Sabathia (16–10)	**Maholm** (9–9)	Torres (28)	31,164	65–93
159	September 25	@ Brewers	1–5 (10)	Stetter (3–1)	**Chavez** (0–1)		40,102	65–94
160	September 26	@ Padres	6–3	**Snell** (7–12)	Ekstrom (0–2)	**Capps** (21)	27,227	66–94
161	September 27	@ Padres	2–3	Young (7–6)	**Barthmaier** (0–2)	Hoffman (30)	29,825	66–95
162	September 28	@ Padres	6–1	**Yates** (6–3)	LeBlanc (1–3)		29,191	67–95

Legend: = Win = Loss = Postponement
Bold = Pirates team member

=== Record vs. opponents ===
2008 National League record Source: MLB Standings Grid – 2008
Team	AZ	ATL	CHC	CIN	COL	FLA	HOU	LAD	MIL	NYM	PHI	PIT	SD	SF	STL	WAS	AL
Arizona	–	3–5	2–4	2–4	15–3	2–7	4–2	8–10	2–5	3–3	3–4	4–3	10–8	11–7	3–4	4–2	6–9
Atlanta	5–3	–	0–6	3–3	4–3	10–8	3–3	4–2	3–6	11–7	4–14	2–5	5–1	2–5	2–5	6–12	8–7
Chicago	4–2	6–0	–	8–7	5–1	4–3	8–9	5–2	9–7	4–2	3–4	14–4	5–2	4–3	9–6	3–3	6–9
Cincinnati	4–2	3–3	7–8	–	1–5	6–2	3–12	1–7	10–8	3–4	3–5	6–9	4–3	5–1	5–10	4–3	9–6
Colorado	3–15	3–4	1–5	5–1	–	5–3	3–3	8–10	4–3	3–6	0–5	5–2	9–9	11–7	3–4	4–3	7–8
Florida	7–2	8–10	3–4	2–6	3–5	–	4–2	3–4	5–1	8–10	10–8	3–2	4–2	3–3	2–5	14–3	5–10
Houston	2–4	3–3	9–8	12–3	3–3	2–4	–	4–3	7–8	5–2	3–4	8–8	3–3	7–1	7–8	4–2	7–11
Los Angeles	10–8	2–4	2–5	7–1	10–8	4–3	3–4	–	4–2	3–4	4–4	5–2	11–7	9–9	2–4	3–3	5–10
Milwaukee	5–2	6–3	7–9	8–10	3–4	1–5	8–7	2–4	–	2–4	1–5	14–1	4–3	6–0	10–5	6–2	7–8
New York	3–3	7–11	2–4	4–3	6–3	10–8	2–5	4–3	4–2	–	11–7	4–3	2–5	5–1	4–3	12–6	9–6
Philadelphia	4–3	14–4	4–3	5–3	5–0	8–10	4–3	4–4	5–1	7–11	–	4–2	4–2	3–3	5–4	12–6	4–11
Pittsburgh	3–4	5–2	4–14	9–6	2–5	2–3	8–8	2–5	1–14	3–4	2–4	–	3–4	4–2	10–7	3–4	6–9
San Diego	8–10	1–5	2–5	3–4	9–9	2–4	3–3	7–11	3–4	5–2	2–4	4–3	–	5–13	1–6	5–1	3–15
San Francisco	7–11	5–2	3–4	1–5	7–11	3–3	1–7	9–9	0–6	1–5	3–3	2–4	13–5	–	4–3	7–0	6–12
St. Louis	4–3	5–2	6–9	10–5	4–3	5–2	8–7	4–2	5–10	3–4	4–5	7–10	6–1	3–4	–	5–1	7–8
Washington	2–4	12–6	3–3	3–4	3–4	3–14	2–4	3–3	2–6	6–12	6–12	4–3	1–5	0–7	1–5	–	8–10

=== Detailed records ===
**National League**
Opponent	W	L	WP	RS	RA
**NL East**
Atlanta Braves	5	2	0.714	32	36
Florida Marlins	2	3	0.400	23	26
New York Mets	3	4	0.429	34	26
Philadelphia Phillies	2	4	0.333	21	25
Washington Nationals	3	4	0.429	39	34
Total	15	17	0.469	149	147
**NL Central**
Chicago Cubs	4	14	0.222	73	131
Cincinnati Reds	9	6	0.600	68	63
Houston Astros	8	8	0.500	70	75
Milwaukee Brewers	1	14	0.067	41	90
St. Louis Cardinals	10	7	0.588	104	94
Total	32	49	0.395	356	453
**NL West**
Arizona Diamondbacks	3	4	0.429	25	30
Colorado Rockies	2	5	0.286	27	43
Los Angeles Dodgers	2	5	0.286	31	49
San Diego Padres	3	4	0.429	35	26
San Francisco Giants	4	2	0.667	39	29
Total	14	20	0.412	157	177
**American League**
Baltimore Orioles	1	2	0.333	18	21
Chicago White Sox	0	3	0.000	15	37
New York Yankees	2	1	0.667	16	17
Tampa Bay Rays	1	2	0.333	12	17
Toronto Blue Jays	2	1	0.667	12	11
Total	6	9	0.400	73	103
Season Total	67	95	0.414	735	880

Month	Games	Won	Lost	Win %	RS	RA
March	1	1	0	1.000	12	11
April	26	10	16	0.385	116	149
May	28	15	13	0.536	148	136
June	27	12	15	0.444	121	150
July	26	12	14	0.462	136	152
August	28	7	21	0.250	82	150
September	26	10	16	0.385	120	132
Total	162	67	95	0.414	735	880

	Games	Won	Lost	Win %	RS	RA
Home	81	39	42	0.481	361	401
Away	81	28	53	0.346	374	479
Total	162	67	95	0.414	735	880

== Roster ==
2008 Pittsburgh Pirates
Roster
Pitchers: 46 Jimmy Barthmaier; 54 Denny Bautista; 48 T. J. Beam; 61 Sean Burnett; 55 Matt Capps; 43 Jesse Chavez; 35 Jason Davis; 57 Zach Duke; 32 Phil Dumatrait; 24 Tom Gorzelanny; 34 John Grabow; 38 Craig Hansen; 64 Yoslan Herrera; 36 Jeff Karstens; 28 Paul Maholm; 43 Dámaso Marte; 44 Evan Meek; 35 Matt Morris; 49 Ross Ohlendorf; 52 Franquelis Osoria; 56 Marino Salas; 58 Rómulo Sánchez; 45 Ian Snell; 27 Ty Taubenheim; 47 John Van Benschoten; 30 Tyler Yates	Catchers: 37 Raúl Chávez; 6 Robinzon Díaz; 41 Ryan Doumit; 26 Ronny Paulino; Infielders: 19 José Bautista; 10 Brian Bixler; 63 Luis Cruz; 5 Chris Gomez; 25 Adam LaRoche; 15 Andy LaRoche; 16 Doug Mientkiewicz; 31 Luis Rivas; 12 Freddy Sanchez; 2 Jack Wilson	Outfielders: 38 Jason Bay; 13 Nate McLouth; 18 Jason Michaels; 3 Nyjer Morgan; 39 Brandon Moss; 22 Xavier Nady; 51 Steve Pearce	Manager: 7 John Russell; Coaches: 86 Heberto Andrade (bullpen catcher); 23 Jeff Andrews (pitching); 29 Tony Beasley (third base); 60 Luis Dorante (bullpen); 17 Lou Frazier (first base); 59 Don Long (hitting); 14 Gary Varsho (bench)

=== Opening Day lineup ===
Opening Day Starters
Name	Position
Nate McLouth	CF
Freddy Sanchez	2B
Jason Bay	LF
Adam LaRoche	1B
Xavier Nady	RF
Ryan Doumit	C
José Bautista	3B
Jack Wilson	SS
Ian Snell	SP

== Statistics ==
Hitting

Note: G = Games played; AB = At bats; H = Hits; Avg. = Batting average; HR = Home runs; RBI = Runs batted in

Regular season
Player	G	AB	H	Avg.	HR	RBI
R. Díaz	2	6	3	0.500	0	1
T. Taubenheim	1	2	1	0.500	0	1
S. Burnett	55	3	1	0.333	0	0
F. Osoria	41	6	2	0.333	0	1
X. Nady	89	327	108	0.330	13	57
R. Doumit	116	431	137	0.318	15	69
N. Morgan	58	160	47	0.294	0	7
M. Morris	5	7	2	0.286	0	1
J. Bay	106	393	111	0.282	22	64
D. Mientkiewicz	125	285	79	0.277	2	30
N. McLouth	152	597	165	0.276	26	94
C. Gomez	90	183	50	0.273	1	20
J. Wilson	87	305	83	0.272	1	22
F. Sanchez	145	569	154	0.271	9	52
A. LaRoche	136	492	133	0.270	25	85
R. Chávez	42	116	30	0.259	1	10
S. Pearce	37	109	27	0.248	4	15
J. Bautista	107	314	76	0.242	12	44
J. Michaels	102	228	52	0.228	8	44
L. Cruz	22	67	15	0.224	0	3
B. Moss	45	158	35	0.222	6	23
L. Rivas	79	206	45	0.218	3	20
R. Paulino	40	118	25	0.212	2	18
D. Bautista	35	5	1	0.200	0	1
Z. Duke	31	57	9	0.158	0	1
B. Bixler	50	108	17	0.157	0	2
A. LaRoche	49	164	25	0.152	3	12
Y. Herrera	5	7	1	0.143	0	0
J. Karstens	9	14	2	0.143	0	0
I. Snell	31	48	6	0.125	0	1
P. Maholm	30	65	8	0.123	0	3
T. Gorzelanny	20	28	3	0.107	0	3
P. Dumatrait	19	21	1	0.048	0	1
J. Barthmaier	3	3	0	0.000	0	0
T. Beam	32	4	0	0.000	0	0
M. Capps	48	1	0	0.000	0	0
J. Davis	14	8	0	0.000	0	0
J. Grabow	71	1	0	0.000	0	0
R. Ohlendorf	5	6	0	0.000	0	0
J. Van Benschoten	9	6	0	0.000	0	0
J. Chavez	15	0	0	—	0	0
C. Hansen	16	0	0	—	0	0
D. Marte	44	0	0	—	0	0
E. Meek	9	0	0	—	0	0
M. Salas	11	0	0	—	0	0
R. Sánchez	10	0	0	—	0	0
T. Yates	70	0	0	—	0	0
Team totals	162	5,628	1,454	0.258	153	705

Pitching

Note: G = Games pitched; IP = Innings pitched; W = Wins; L = Losses; ERA = Earned run average; SO = Strikeouts

Regular season
Player	G	IP	W	L	ERA	SO
Y. Herrera	5	18 1/3	1	1	9.82	10
M. Morris	5	22 1/3	0	4	9.67	9
J. Van Benschoten	9	22 1/3	1	3	10.48	21
J. Barthmaier	3	10 1/3	0	2	10.45	6
R. Ohlendorf	5	22 2/3	0	3	6.35	13
M. Salas	13	17	1	0	8.47	9
F. Osoria	43	60 2/3	4	3	6.08	31
J. Chavez	15	15	0	1	6.60	16
T. Taubenheim	1	6	0	0	3.00	4
Z. Duke	31	185	5	14	4.82	87
I. Snell	31	164 1/3	7	12	5.42	135
J. Davis	14	34	2	4	5.29	13
D. Bautista	35	41 1/3	4	3	6.10	34
T. Gorzelanny	21	105 1/3	6	9	6.66	67
R. Sánchez	10	13 1/3	0	0	4.05	3
J. Karstens	9	51 1/3	2	6	4.03	23
S. Burnett	58	56 2/3	1	1	4.76	42
P. Dumatrait	21	78 2/3	3	4	5.26	52
P. Maholm	31	206 1/3	9	9	3.71	139
T. Yates	72	73 1/3	6	3	4.66	63
T. Beam	32	45 2/3	2	2	4.14	24
E. Meek	9	13	0	1	6.92	7
M. Capps	49	53 2/3	2	3	3.02	39
D. Marte	47	46 2/3	4	0	3.47	47
J. Grabow	74	76	6	3	2.84	62
C. Hansen	16	15 2/3	1	4	7.47	7
Team totals	162	1,455	67	95	5.08	963

== Awards and honors ==
- Xavier Nady named National League Player of the Week for the opening week of the 2008 regular season.
- Ryan Doumit was named the co-National League Player of the Week, along with Ricky Nolasco, for the week of June 9.
- Nate McLouth was elected to the 2008 National League all-star team. He batted 1–4, and threw a runner out at home plate from center field in the 11th inning, stopping the game-winning run.
- Jason Bay was selected as the winner of the Chuck Tanner Award for "professionalism, cooperation and availability to and with Major League writers best assists them in carrying out daily responsibilities."
- Nate McLouth received the Roberto Clemente as "the Pirates player who best exemplifies the standard of excellence achieved by Clemente."

== Transactions ==
=== Pre-season ===
(October 29, 2007 – March 24, 2008)

- On November 5, 2007, the Pittsburgh Pirates hired John Russell as manager.
- On November 7, 2007, the Pittsburgh Pirates promoted Bryan Minniti to director of baseball operations, hired Greg Smith as director of scouting and hired Kyle Stark as director of player development.
- On November 9, 2007, the Pittsburgh Pirates named Chuck Tanner as a senior advisor to the baseball operations department.
- On November 16, 2007, the Pittsburgh Pirates declined contract option for César Izturis.
- On November 20, 2007, the Pittsburgh Pirates hired Tony Beasley as third-base coach, Gary Varsho as bench coach and Luis Dorante as bullpen coach.
- On November 21, 2007, the Pittsburgh Pirates hired Jeff Andrews as pitching coach.
- On November 27, 2007, the Pittsburgh Pirates hired Don Long as hitting coach.
- On November 28, 2007, the Pittsburgh Pirates lost Shane Youman off of waivers to the Philadelphia Phillies.
- On December 3, 2007, the Pittsburgh Pirates claimed Josh Wilson from the Tampa Bay Rays and Ty Taubenheim from the Toronto Blue Jays off of waivers.
- On December 6, 2007, the Pittsburgh Pirates acquired Evan Meek from the Texas Rangers due to the Rule 5 draft.
- On December 7, 2007, the Pittsburgh Pirates traded Salomón Torres to the Milwaukee Brewers in exchange for Marino Salas and Kevin Roberts.
- On December 12, 2007, the Pittsburgh Pirates signed free agent Chris Gomez to a 1-year contract.
- On December 21, 2007, the Pittsburgh Pirates signed Jorge Velandia, Michel Hernandez, Miguel Perez and Mike Thompson to Minor League contracts.
- On January 7, 2008, the Pittsburgh Pirates signed Adam Bernero and Elmer Dessens to Minor League contracts.
- On January 11, 2008, the Pittsburgh Pirates signed T. J. Beam, Raul Chavez and José Macías to Minor League contracts.
- On January 14, 2008, the Pittsburgh Pirates re-signed Adam LaRoche to a 1-year/$5 million contract.
- On January 17, 2008, the Pittsburgh Pirates re-signed José Bautista to a 1-year/$1.8 million contract.
- On January 18, 2008, the Pittsburgh Pirates re-signed Xavier Nady to a 1-year/$3.35 million contract and John Grabow to a 1-year/$1.135 million contract.
- On January 23, 2008, the Pittsburgh Pirates signed Jaret Wright to a Minor League contract.
- On January 24, 2008, the Pittsburgh Pirates signed Hector Carrasco and Casey Fossum to Minor League contracts.
- On February 1, 2008, the Pittsburgh Pirates claimed Ray Olmedo off of waivers from the Toronto Blue Jays.
- On February 5, 2008, the Pittsburgh Pirates re-signed Freddy Sanchez to a 2-year/$11 million contract.
- On February 11, 2008, the Pittsburgh Pirates signed New York Yankees free agent Doug Mientkiewicz to a Minor League contract.
- On February 24, 2008, the Pittsburgh Pirates signed free agent Byung-hyun Kim to a 1-year/$850K contract.
- On February 26, 2008, the Pittsburgh Pirates lost Ray Olmedo to the Philadelphia Phillies off of waivers.
- On March 16, 2008, the Pittsburgh Pirates resigned Ian Snell to a 3-year contract.

=== In-season ===
(March 25, 2008 – October 29, 2008)

- On March 26, 2008, the Pittsburgh Pirates announced the retirement of Masumi Kuwata, released Byung-hyun Kim, Hector Carrasco and Juan Perez and acquired Tyler Yates from the Atlanta Braves in exchange for Todd Redmond.
- On March 31, 2008, the Pittsburgh Pirates signed free agent Jason Davis and Matt Kata to Minor League contracts and released Josh Sharpless.
- On April 4, 2008, the Pittsburgh Pirates signed Matt Capps to a 2-year/$3.05 million contract.
- On May 1, 2008, the Pittsburgh Pirates released Olivo Astacio.
- On May 8, 2008, the Pittsburgh Pirates acquired Jason Michaels from the Cleveland Indians in exchange for a player to be named.
- On June 4, 2008, the Pittsburgh Pirates signed Franklyn Germán to a Minor League contract.
- On June 25, 2008, the Pittsburgh Pirates acquired Denny Bautista from the Detroit Tigers in exchange for Kyle Pearson and released Kevin Thompson.
- On July 10, 2008, the Pittsburgh Pirates traded Craig Wilson to the Seattle Mariners in exchange for a player to be named, acquired Dan Reichert and Ryan Mulhern from the Cleveland Indians in exchange for cash considerations and lost Bryan Bullington to the Cleveland Indians off of waivers.
- On July 26, 2008, the Pittsburgh Pirates acquired José Tábata, Ross Ohlendorf, Jeff Karstens and Daniel McCutchen from the New York Yankees in exchange for Xavier Nady and Dámaso Marte.
- On July 31, 2008, the Pittsburgh Pirates traded Jason Bay to the Boston Red Sox in exchange for Brandon Moss and Craig Hansen from the Boston Red Sox as well as Andy LaRoche and Bryan Morris from the Los Angeles Dodgers.
- On August 21, 2008, the Pittsburgh Pirates traded José Bautista to the Toronto Blue Jays in exchange for a player to be named. (Robinzon Diaz converted on August 25, 2008)
- On August 27, 2008, the Pittsburgh Pirates lost free agent Elmer Dessens to the Atlanta Braves.
- On September 2, 2008, the Pittsburgh Pirates released Ty Taubenheim.
- On September 24, 2008, the Pittsburgh Pirates signed Pedro Alvarez to a Major League contract.

== Draft picks ==
2008 Top 10 Rounds Draft Picks
Rd	#	Player	Pos	DOB and Age	School
1	2	Pedro Álvarez	3B	February 6, 1987 (aged 21)	Vanderbilt University (Nashville, Tennessee)
2	48	Tanner Scheppers	RHP	January 17, 1987 (aged 21)	California State University, Fresno (Fresno, California)
3	79	Jordy Mercer	SS	August 27, 1986 (aged 21)	Oklahoma State University (Stillwater, Oklahoma)
4	114	Chase d'Arnaud	SS	January 21, 1987 (aged 21)	Pepperdine University (Malibu, California)
5	144	Justin Wilson	LHP	August 18, 1987 (aged 20)	California State University, Fresno (Fresno, California)
6	174	Robbie Grossman	OF	September 16, 1989 (aged 18)	Cy-Fair High School (Cypress, Texas)
7	204	Benji Gonzalez	SS	January 16, 1990 (aged 18)	Puerto Rico Baseball Academy and High School (Gurabo, PR)
8	234	Jeremy Farrell	3B	November 11, 1986 (aged 21)	University of Virginia (Charlottesville, Virginia)
9	264	Matt Hague	3B	August 20, 1985 (aged 22)	Oklahoma State University (Stillwater, Oklahoma)
10	294	Drew Gagnon	RHP	June 26, 1990 (aged 17)	Liberty High School (Brentwood, California)

Note

- Age at time of draft.

== Farm system ==
Level	Team	League	Manager
AAA	Indianapolis Indians	International League	Trent Jewett
AA	Altoona Curve	Eastern League	Tim Leiper
A	Lynchburg Hillcats	Carolina League	Jeff Branson
A	Hickory Crawdads	South Atlantic League	Gary Green
A-Short Season	State College Spikes	New York–Penn League	Brad Fischer
Rookie	GCL Pirates	Gulf Coast League	Tom Prince
Rookie	DSL Pirates	Dominican Summer League	N/A
Rookie	VSL Pirates	Venezuelan Summer League	N/A

LEAGUE CHAMPIONS: VSL Pirates

== See also ==
- 2008 Major League Baseball season
