= John Grabow =

American baseball player (born 1978)

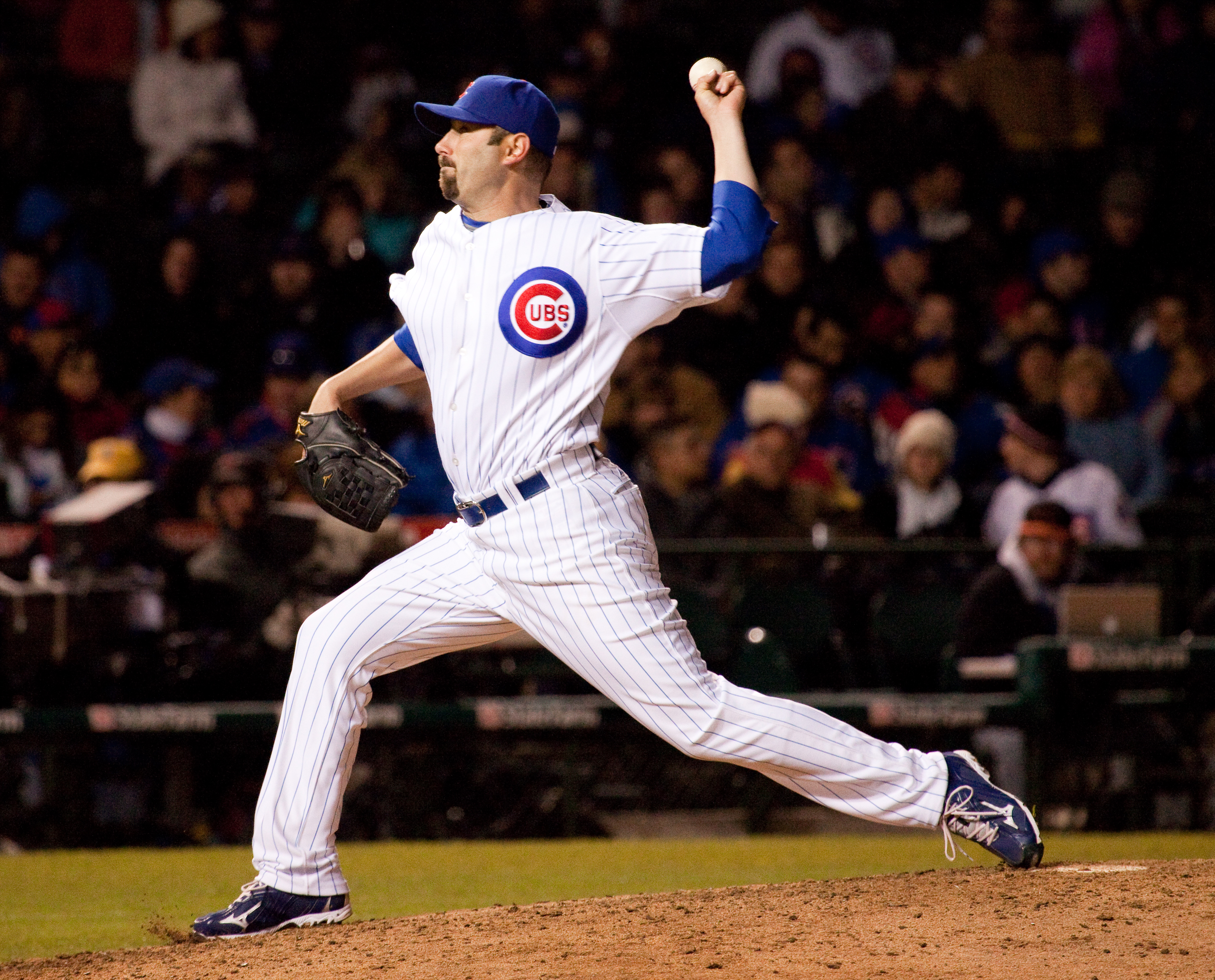
- Grabow with the Chicago Cubs
- Pitcher
- Born: November 4, 1978 (age 48); Arcadia, California, U.S.
- Batted: Left Threw: Left

MLB debut
- September 14, 2003, for the Pittsburgh Pirates

Last MLB appearance
- September 20, 2011, for the Chicago Cubs

MLB statistics
- Win–loss record: 24–19
- Earned run average: 4.31
- Strikeouts: 400
- Stats at Baseball Reference

Teams
- Pittsburgh Pirates (2003–2009); Chicago Cubs (2009–2011)

John William Grabow, nicknamed "Grabes" (born November 4, 1978) is an American former professional baseball left-handed relief pitcher. He played in Major League Baseball (MLB) for the Pittsburgh Pirates and Chicago Cubs from 2003 to 2011.

In his MLB career, he held opposing batters to a .218 batting average and a .293 slugging percentage when there were runners in scoring position. He made 340 appearances between 2004 and 2008, which ranks him fourth in the majors and first among left-handed relievers in the National League for that period.

In nine years in the MLB he played in 506 games and had a 24–19 record, using a fastball, slider, and change up.

== Early and personal life ==
Grabow grew up in Arcadia, California, and was a Dodgers fan, playing first base. Grabow is Jewish, as is his mother, and his Lebanese-Jewish maternal grandmother had the surname Mizrachi and immigrated from Beirut, Lebanon. There were 13 Jewish players in the majors in 2008, including Kevin Youkilis, Ryan Braun, Jason Marquis, and Ian Kinsler. Grabow was one of three Jewish ballplayers on the Team USA 2009 World Baseball Classic team, joining Braun and Youkilis. His 448 career games pitched through 2010 placed him 3rd on the all-time list for Jewish major league pitchers, three games behind Ken Holtzman.

Grabow married Kindra Townsend Grabow in 2016.

== High school ==
He was a pitcher at San Gabriel High School in California, and was named his league's most valuable player as well as All-California Interscholastic Federation in baseball in his senior year in 1997. He was drafted by the Pittsburgh Pirates in the 3rd round of the 1997 amateur draft.

== Baseball career ==
=== Minor leagues ===
In 1998, Grabow was hit on the ear by a foul ball while sitting in the dugout and spent some time on the disabled list.

In 1999 Grabow led the Hickory Crawdads (A) in victories, starts, and innings pitched, and ranked third in the South Atlantic League in strikeouts with 164, in 156 innings.

Grabow matched the Altoona Curve record for career wins, with 24. Until 2003, he had pitched only 10 times in relief as a pro. That season Altoona manager Dale Sveum and pitching coach Jeff Andrews asked Grabow to make the switch, suggesting it might be a good career move. "I didn't know if it was a step backwards", Grabow said. But Grabow was then promoted to Class AAA Nashville in July, and pitched exclusively as a relief pitcher there before joining the Pirates for the final weeks of the year.

Through 2003, he averaged 7.6 strikeouts per 9 innings in the minor leagues, striking out 9.5 batters per 9 innings at the AAA level.

In the summer of 2003 he made six appearances with Team USA in the Olympic qualifying team trials.

=== Major leagues ===
==== Pittsburgh Pirates ====
Grabow was called up by the Pittsburgh Pirates in 2003, after having spent six years playing in the minor leagues. It was the most memorable moment of his life.

Grabow appeared in 68 games in his first year with the Pirates, a team record for the number of appearances by a rookie left-hander. Used both in short stints and long ones, Grabow said: "That stuff where there are guys in certain roles, yeah, there are some guys who have roles set, but I don't think I'm one of them. I just pitch when they tell me to. Whether it's one or two innings, or to one batter, it doesn't matter to me."

On the light side, for his rookie hazing he had to wear a Tweety Bird backpack during batting practice and carrying all the snacks to the bullpen, go through an airport wearing a cheerleader outfit that was two sizes too small, and serve drinks on the plane.

In February 2005 Grabow signed a contract pursuant to which he would make $327,000 in the majors, but $240,000 if he pitched at Class AAA Indianapolis. He was a workhorse in the Pittsburgh bullpen in 2005, appearing in 63 games in his second full major league season. He held opposing batters to a .186 batting average and a .186 slugging percentage when there were runners in scoring position. He stranded a major-league best 89.7% of his inherited runners, allowing just 4 of 39 inherited runners to score.

In 2006, he appeared in 72 games. He held opposing batters to a .217 batting average when there were runners in scoring position. Grabow stranded 82.5% of the runners he inherited, the best in the National League.

In February 2007, Grabow and the Pirates avoided arbitration, and agreed to a 1-year contract for $832,500. Grabow was also in a position to make $10,000 to $70,000 in incentive bonuses if he finished 20–35 games, but was not able to cash in as he only finished 14 games. He was also in a position to make an additional $10,000 to $45,000 in incentive bonuses if he made 75–85 appearances, but again was not able to cash in as he made only 63 appearances.

Grabow was 3–2 with the Pirates, with a 4.53 ERA. He had held batters to a .215 batting average and a .231 slugging percentage with runners in scoring position, while leading the team by only allowing 5.3% of batters he faced to get extra base hits.

Grabow initially planned to have minor surgery after the 2007 season to remove bone chips in his left elbow. But after receiving a cortisone shot in August, he changed his mind. "I've been symptom-free for the past few weeks", Grabow said. "I want to see what my options are. I don't think I'll really need to have surgery. Maybe I can manage it, and pitch through it." He had his left elbow examined by Los Angeles Angels orthopedist Lewis Yocum, who suggested that rest would be an effective alternative to arthroscopic surgery. Grabow then decided against surgery, and instead followed a program of rest and rehabilitation, extending his period of rest from three to eight weeks, and concentrating his workouts more on strengthening his legs and shoulders.

Grabow earned $1.135 million in 2008. He also had the potential to earn an additional $75,000 based on appearances.

In 2008, he had the third-lowest ERA of all NL left-handed relievers (2.84), and stranded all but 8 of his 33 inherited runners (76%). Batters hit only .215 against him (and only .146 with runners in scoring position), and he struck out a team-best 19.3% of all batters he faced, while leading the team by only allowing 5.6% of batters he faced to get extra base hits. He also pitched in 74 games, four short of the record for left-handed pitchers, set by Scott Sauerbeck in 2002.

Grabow edged Minnesota's Craig Breslow for the 2008 Barney Pelty Award for Jewish Pitcher of the Year.

Grabow agreed to a one-year deal for $2.3 million, with an additional $75,000 possible in incentives, in early January. Despite Grabow being eligible to become a free agent at the end of the season, the Pirates did not engage in contract talks beyond 2008.

Grabow accepted an invitation to play for Team USA in 2009 in the second World Baseball Classic. He was the first member of the Pirates to represent the US in the WBC. "It's just a thrill, a real honor", he said. "When I got the call, I couldn't believe it. Hopefully, I can help them win some games." He tied for the WBC lead in games pitched (with six), and had a 2.08 ERA, helping Team USA reach the semi-finals.

On July 20 Grabow became the all-time appearances leader at PNC Park with his 189th, and was tied for ninth all-time on the Pirates' appearance list (385) with Rip Sewell.

In July 2009 the New York Yankees, Minnesota Twins, Florida Marlins, and Los Angeles Dodgers had all expressed interest in trading for Grabow. Asked about the possibility of the Pirates trading him, Grabow, failing to stifle a grin, responded "I'm untouchable, dude. No way they're trading me." On July 30, Grabow was traded to the Chicago Cubs along with fellow left-handed pitcher Tom Gorzelanny for right-handed pitchers Kevin Hart and José Ascanio and minor league third baseman Josh Harrison.

==== Chicago Cubs ====
Grabow began his Cubs career with 16 consecutive scoreless appearances (over 13.0 innings), and stranded his first 11 inherited runners.

He pitched 30 games for the Cubs, ending the season with a career-high 75 games pitched.

On November 20, 2009, he signed a two-year extension with the Cubs worth $7.5 million. General Manager Jim Hendry said: "It was really imperative we re-sign Grabow, because he's not only our kind of guy and very successful, but has some experience and some savvy to him and can pitch seventh, eighth, ninth, matchups, righties, lefties. It doesn't matter." Grabow said he had no preference as to how he was used: "If it's the sixth inning or if it's the ninth inning, it doesn't matter. Your job is to go in there and get guys out." He became a free agent following the 2011 season.

=== Los Angeles Dodgers ===
On December 19, 2011, Grabow signed a minor league contract with the Los Angeles Dodgers. He opted out of his contract on March 26, 2012 and became a free agent.

== Pitching style ==
Grabow had a 94 mph fastball that runs inside on left-handed hitters, a sharp, hard, late-breaking slider, "one of the best changeups in the game", "the bottom falling out of it", which confounds right-handers, and was equally adept at getting both right and left-handed batters out.

== See also ==
- List of Jewish Major League Baseball players
