= Rómulo Sánchez =

Venezuelan baseball player (born 1984)

- Pitcher
- Born: 28 April 1984 (age 42); Carora, Lara, Venezuela
- Batted: Right Threw: Right

Professional debut
- MLB: 26 August, 2007, for the Pittsburgh Pirates
- NPB: 1 May, 2011, for the Tohoku Rakuten Golden Eagles

Last appearance
- MLB: 25 September, 2010, for the New York Yankees
- NPB: 10 August, 2011, for the Tohoku Rakuten Golden Eagles

MLB statistics
- Win–loss record: 1–0
- Earned run average: 4.04
- Strikeouts: 19

NPB statistics
- Win–loss record: 0–2
- Earned run average: 4.96
- Strikeouts: 19
- Stats at Baseball Reference

Teams
- Pittsburgh Pirates (2007–2008); New York Yankees (2010); Tohoku Rakuten Golden Eagles (2011); Chinatrust Brother Elephants (2014)

Rómulo Ignacio Sánchez Oviedo (born 28 April 1984) is a Venezuelan former professional baseball pitcher. He pitched in Major League Baseball (MLB) for the Pittsburgh Pirates and New York Yankees, in Nippon Professional Baseball (NPB) for the Tohoku Rakuten Golden Eagles, and in the Chinese Professional Baseball League (CPBL) for the Chinatrust Brother Elephants.

== Career ==
=== Los Angeles Dodgers ===
Sánchez was signed as an undrafted free agent by the Los Angeles Dodgers on 8 March 2002. He pitched asva starter in the Dominican Summer League in 2002 and 2003. He was released by the Dodgers on 12 March 2004.

=== Pittsburgh Pirates ===
He was picked up by the Pittsburgh Pirates on 7 May 2004. He pitched in the Venezuelan League in 2004 for the Pirates, throwing a no-hitter with 12 strikeouts in one game. Sánchez made his stateside debut in 2005, making appearances in rookie ball, Single-A, and Double-A. Due to a lack of secondary pitches, the Pirates converted him to a reliever in 2006. He spent most of his time in A-ball, pitching to a 7.08 ERA in 40.2 innings over 21 games with the Hickory Crawdads. Sánchez missed the last two months of the season with shoulder tendinitis. After the season, Baseball America ranked him as the Pirates' 30th best prospect. He was also added to the 40-man roster.

Sánchez began the 2007 season with the Altoona Curve and pitched to a 6–3 record with a 2.81 ERA in 40 relief appearances. His career walk rate went from 3.9 BB/9 to 2.7, which was enough of an improvement for the big league club to take notice. When Salomón Torres went on the disabled list on 25 August, Sánchez was called up. He made his Major League debut on 26 August against the Houston Astros, throwing two thirds of an inning. Sánchez allowed eight runs in three games consecutive appearances, which greatly contributed to his 5.00 ERA in 18 innings. After the season, he was ranked as the 13th best prospect in the Pirates system by Baseball America.

In 2008, he started the season in Triple-A with the Indianapolis Indians. Sánchez was called up to the majors on 29 June after going 4–0 with four saves and a 2.85 ERA in 28 relief appearances. On 1 July, he picked up his only MLB save during a 6–5 extra inning Pirates victory over the Reds. He allowed six runs on 14 hits and six walks over 13.1 innings of work in multiple stints with the team that year. During spring training in 2009, Sánchez was designated for assignment. He was then outrighted to Triple-A.

=== New York Yankees ===
Sánchez was traded to the New York Yankees for Eric Hacker on 16 May 2009. The Yankees attempted to convert him back into a starter. Following the 2009 season, Sánchez was added to the 40-man roster to protect him from the Rule 5 draft. On 7 May 2010, the Yankees recalled Sánchez to the major leagues. He appeared in two games and worked four and one third innings without allowing a run. In 2011, Sánchez was out of options and did not travel with the team amid speculation of an coming trade.

=== Tohoku Rakuten Golden Eagles ===
On 11 April 2011, Sánchez signed with Tohoku Rakuten Golden Eagles of the Nippon Professional Baseball (NPB) for $475k plus bonuses. He was 0–2 with a 4.96 ERA in 15 games. On 29 November 2011, he became free agent.

=== Tampa Bay Rays ===
On 19 January 2012, Sánchez signed a minor league contract with the Tampa Bay Rays. He did not make the team out of spring training and was assigned to Triple-A Durham before the season. On 2 August, Sánchez was released by the Rays. He went 2–2 with a 6.31 ERA in 34 appearances with Durham.

=== Olmecas de Tabasco ===
He participated in the 2013 World Baseball Classic as a member of Team Venezuela. On 21 March 2013, Sánchez signed with Olmecas de Tabasco of the Mexican League, where he was 0–2 with an 8.59 ERA in 8 games. He was released on 9 April.

=== Los Angeles Dodgers (second stint) ===
Sánchez signed a minor league contract with the Los Angeles Dodgers on 13 December 2013. He was released March 2014.

=== Chinatrust Brothers ===
He joined the Chinatrust Brothers in the Chinese Professional Baseball League for the 2014 season. Sánchez pitched to a 2.00 ERA in 27 innings mostly out of the bullpen.

=== T&A San Marino ===
For the 2015 season, Sánchez signed with T&A San Marino of the Italian Baseball League. He allowed a 5.59 ERA in just 9.2 innings of work. San Marino removed him from the roster in April.

== See also ==
- List of Major League Baseball players from Venezuela
