= Luis Cruz =

Mexican baseball infielder (born 1984)

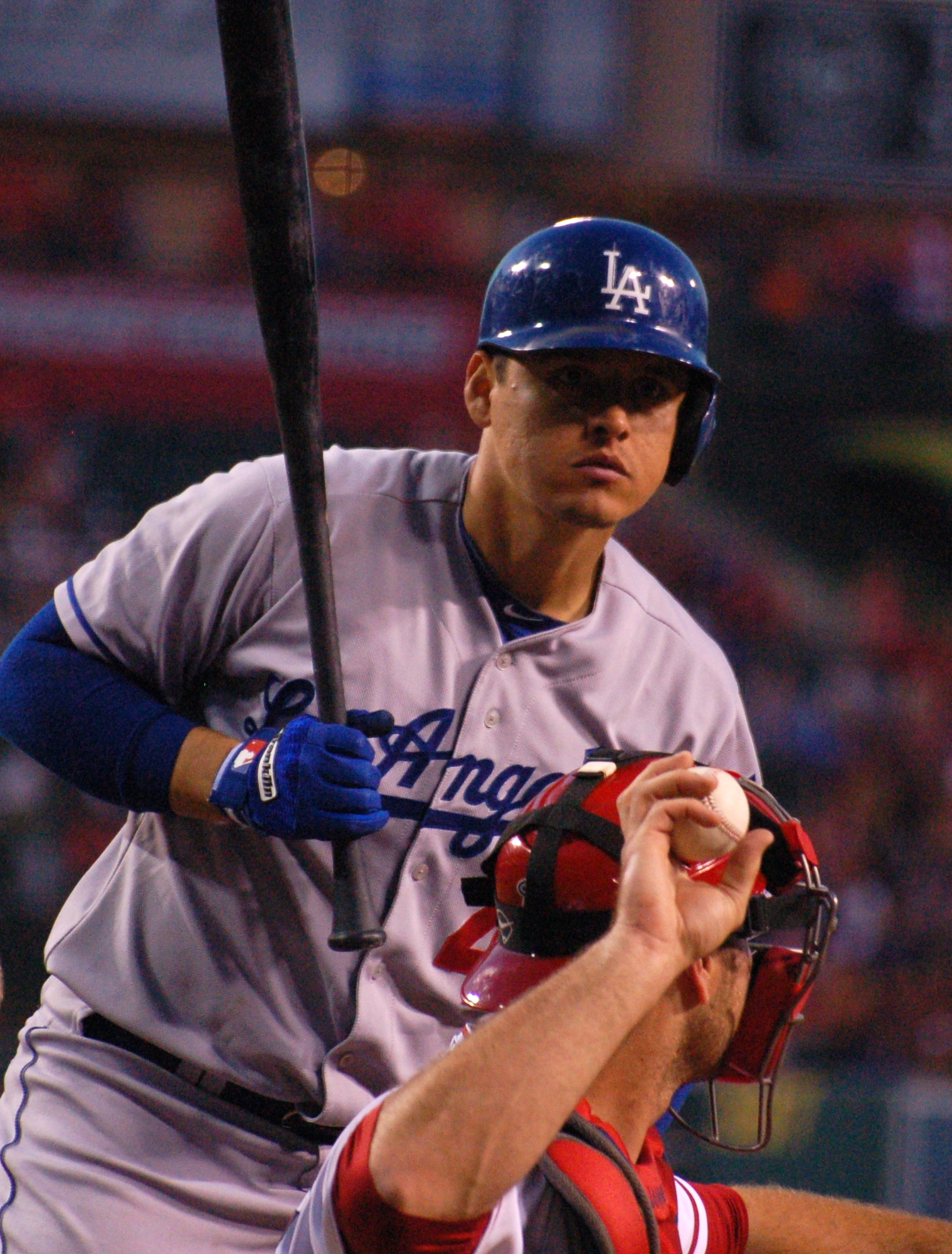
- Cruz with the Los Angeles Dodgers
- Infielder
- Born: February 10, 1984 (age 42); Navojoa, Sonora, Mexico
- Batted: Right Threw: Right

Professional debut
- MLB: September 2, 2008, for the Pittsburgh Pirates
- NPB: March 28, 2014, for the Chiba Lotte Marines

Last appearance
- MLB: July 22, 2013, for the New York Yankees
- NPB: August 10, 2017, for the Tohoku Rakuten Golden Eagles

MLB statistics
- Batting average: .234
- Home runs: 7
- Runs batted in: 57

NPB statistics
- Batting average: .246
- Home runs: 43
- Runs batted in: 174
- Stats at Baseball Reference

Teams
- Pittsburgh Pirates (2008–2009); Milwaukee Brewers (2010); Los Angeles Dodgers (2012–2013); New York Yankees (2013); Chiba Lotte Marines (2014–2015); Yomiuri Giants (2016–2017); Tohoku Rakuten Golden Eagles (2017)

Luis Alfonso Cruz (born February 10, 1984) is a Mexican former professional baseball infielder who is currently a radio broadcaster for the Los Angeles Dodgers of Major League Baseball (MLB). He played in MLB for the Pittsburgh Pirates, Milwaukee Brewers, Dodgers, and New York Yankees, and in Nippon Professional Baseball (NPB) for the Chiba Lotte Marines, Yomiuri Giants, and Tohoku Rakuten Golden Eagles.

== Professional baseball career ==
=== Boston Red Sox ===
Cruz was originally signed by the Boston Red Sox as an amateur free agent on August 29, 2000. He played in the rookie leagues with the Gulf Coast Red Sox in 2001 and for 21 games in 2002 before he was promoted to the Class-A Augusta Greenjackets to finish the 2002 season. He hit .268 in 74 rookie league games and .188 with the Greenjackets.

=== San Diego Padres ===
On December 16, 2002, Cruz was traded to the San Diego Padres in exchange for César Crespo. He played for the Padres organization through 2007, with the Fort Wayne Wizards (129 games in 2003), Lake Elsinore Storm (124 games in 2004), Mobile BayBears (44 games in 2005, 130 games in 2006), San Antonio Missions (69 games in 2007) and Portland Beavers (45 games in 2007). In 2004, with Lake Elsinore, he was selected to the California League mid-season all-star team. In 2005, he was loaned to the Diablos Rojos del México on the Mexican League for past of the season and also played for the Mayos de Navojoa of the Mexican Pacific League after the season, reaching the championship series, where he hit .375. In 2006, with Mobile, he was named the BayBears player of the year, was a Southern League All-Star and participated in the All-Star Futures Game.

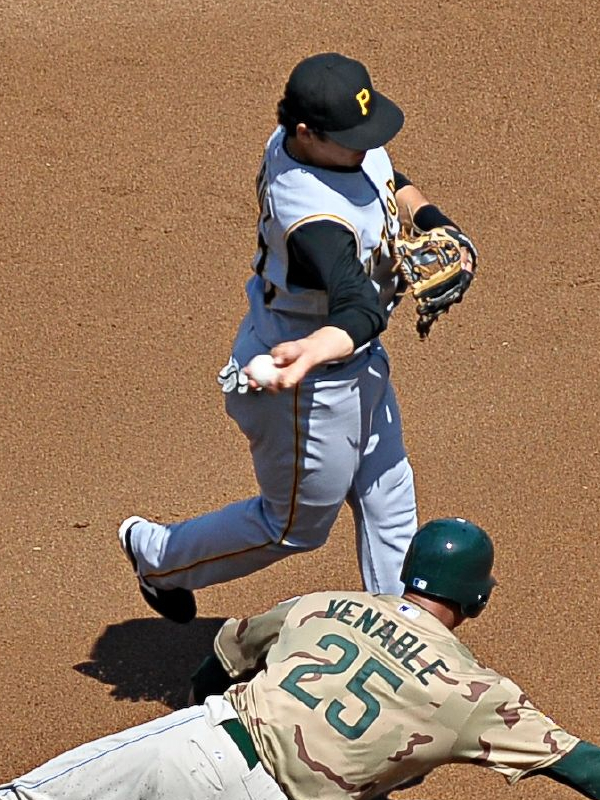
Cruz playing for the Pittsburgh Pirates in 2008

=== Pittsburgh Pirates ===
Cruz signed a minor league contract with the Pittsburgh Pirates for the 2008 season. He spent the majority of the year with the Double-A Altoona Curve and Triple-A Indianapolis Indians, where he hit .279 in a combined 137 games with nine home runs and 61 RBI. He was called up to Pittsburgh and made his major league debut for the Pirates on September 2, 2008 against the Cincinnati Reds, recording a single to left field in his first Major League at-bat off of Aaron Harang. He had 15 hits in 67 at-bats for the Pirates in 2008, a .224 batting average.

Though he began the 2009 season on the Pirates major league roster, Cruz was reassigned to Triple-A in mid-April to make room for second baseman Delwyn Young, recently acquired in a trade. He was called back up on July 10. He appeared in a total of 27 games for the Pirates, hitting .214 and also played in 66 for Indianapolis, where he hit .253.

=== Milwaukee Brewers ===
After being claimed off waivers by the Milwaukee Brewers on December 7, 2009, Cruz played the entire 2010 season with the Triple-A Nashville Sounds (hitting .281 in 129 games) before being recalled by the Brewers on September 6, 2010. He appeared in only seven games that September for the Brewers and hit .235 (four hits in 17 at-bats).

During spring training 2011, Cruz was outrighted to Nashville but refused the assignment and opted for free agency on March 28.

=== Texas Rangers ===
Cruz signed a minor league contract with the Texas Rangers on March 28, one day after his release by the Brewers. He played in 67 games for the AAA Round Rock Express, hitting .273 and also spent some more time on loan to the Mexican League.

=== Los Angeles Dodgers ===
Cruz signed a minor league contract with the Los Angeles Dodgers on November 15, 2011. After failing to make the Dodgers opening day roster, he was assigned to the Triple-A Albuquerque Isotopes, where he hit .318 and was selected to the Pacific Coast League mid-season All-Star team. He was called up to the Dodgers on July 2, 2012 when the Dodgers shortstop, Dee Gordon, was injured. The following day he stole home after doubling in a game against the Cincinnati Reds. He hit his first Major League home run on July 20 against Johan Santana of the New York Mets. Cruz remained in the starting lineup the rest of the season, first at shortstop and then switching over to third base when the Dodgers acquired Hanley Ramírez. Cruz's underdog success during 2012 led the home crowds at Dodger Stadium to chant "Cruuuuuz" when he came up to bat and the Dodgers began selling his replica jersey in the gift shop. During the 2012 season, he played in 78 games for the Dodgers and hit .297 with six home runs and 40 RBI.

Cruz began 2013 as the Dodgers starting third baseman but hit poorly and wound up as a seldom used utility infielder. In 45 games, he hit only .127 with three extra base hits. The Dodgers designated him for assignment and removed him from the 40 man roster on June 28. On July 2, he declined an assignment to AAA and became a free agent.

=== New York Yankees ===
On July 3, 2013, Cruz signed with the New York Yankees. He played in just 16 games for the Yankees, hitting .182 before he was placed on the disabled list with a knee sprain on July 24. The Yankees designated him for assignment on August 16 and he was released the following day.

=== Chiba Lotte Marines ===
Cruz signed with the Chiba Lotte Marines in Japan's Nippon Professional Baseball for 2014. He would spend two years with the club, leading the team in home runs in 2014 with 16 and hitting 16 more in the 2015 season.

=== Yomiuri Giants ===
On December 11, 2015 Cruz signed a two-year deal with the Yomiuri Giants worth a total of four million dollars. In 2016 with the Giants, Cruz played in 81 games, batting .252 with 11 home runs and 37 RBIs. Cruz began with 2017 season with the Giants, appearing in nine games with the club, with a .156 average.

=== Tohoku Rakuten Golden Eagles ===
On July 26, 2017, Cruz's contract was purchased by the Tohoku Rakuten Golden Eagles of Nippon Professional Baseball. In 13 games, he batted .162. On December 2, 2017, he became a free agent.

=== Mexican League ===
On February 1, 2018, Cruz signed with the Diablos Rojos del México of the Mexican Baseball League, where he hit .307 in 23 games. The following season, Cruz signed with the Toros de Tijuana where, in 91 games, he hit .320/.363/.623 with 27 home runs, 72 RBIs and 2 stolen bases.

Cruz did not play in a game in 2020 due to the cancellation of the Mexican League season because of the COVID-19 pandemic but he returned to Tijuana for the 2021 season, where he played in 52 games and hit .312/.320/.427 with six home runs and 31 RBI.

On March 3, 2022, he was traded to the Generales de Durango in exchange for future considerations. He did not play during the 2022 season but was activated off the reserve list on May 27, 2023. In 24 games for Durango, he batted .319/.351/.418 with one home run and 12 RBI. On November 21, 2023, Cruz was selected by the Dorados de Chihuahua in the team's expansion draft. He spent the entire year on the reserve list and did not appear in a game during the 2024 season.

== International competition ==
He was selected to the Mexico national baseball team for the 2006 World Baseball Classic, 2013 World Baseball Classic, 2017 World Baseball Classic and 2019 exhibition games against Japan.

== Broadcasting career ==
On November 15, 2024, the Los Angeles Dodgers announced that Cruz would serve as an analyst for its Spanish-language radio broadcasts on KTNQ beginning in the 2025 season.
