= Kevin Hart (baseball) =

American baseball player (born 1982)

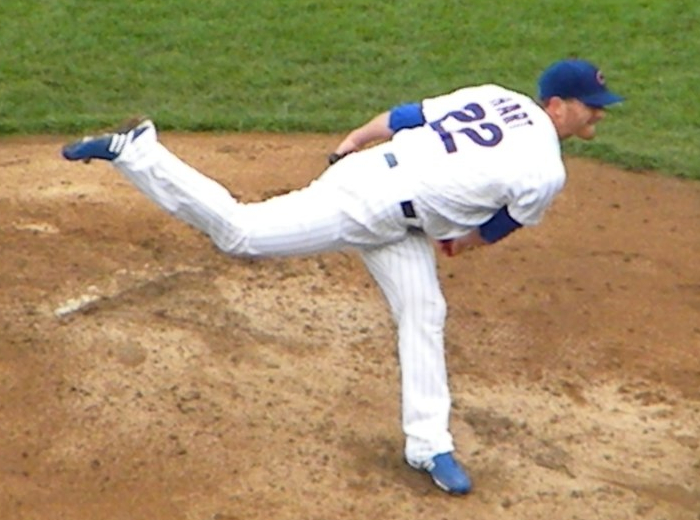
- Hart with the Chicago Cubs in 2009
- Pitcher
- Born: December 29, 1982 (age 43); Cleveland, Ohio, U.S.
- Batted: Right Threw: Right

MLB debut
- September 4, 2007, for the Chicago Cubs

Last MLB appearance
- September 29, 2009, for the Pittsburgh Pirates

MLB statistics
- Win–loss record: 6–11
- Earned run average: 5.26
- Strikeouts: 88
- Stats at Baseball Reference

Teams
- Chicago Cubs (2007–2009); Pittsburgh Pirates (2009)

Kevin Richard Hart (born December 29, 1982) is an American former professional baseball pitcher who played in Major League Baseball (MLB) for the Chicago Cubs and Pittsburgh Pirates. As of 2016, he is a Major League Professional Scout for the New York Yankees.

== Career ==
=== Chicago Cubs ===
Hart attended Jesuit College Preparatory School of Dallas and played collegiately at the University of Maryland before being selected by the Baltimore Orioles in the 11th round (319th pick) in the 2004 Major League Baseball draft. On December 7, 2006, Hart was acquired by the Chicago Cubs as the player to be named later in a trade that had sent Freddie Bynum to the Orioles a day earlier.

When rosters expanded, he made his major league debut on September 4, 2007, after being called up from the Double-A Tennessee Smokies that same day. Hart's debut came under difficult circumstances, as he was summoned to relieve Will Ohman in the 8th inning of a game against the Los Angeles Dodgers with the bases loaded and nobody out. After walking the first batter (former Cub Ramón Martínez) on 4 pitches to force in a run, Hart struck out Mark Sweeney, and Rafael Furcal hit into an inning-ending double play. Hart gave up one hit in his second inning of work while also striking out Jeff Kent and Andre Ethier, for a total of three strikeouts, one hit, and no runs in his two-inning Major League debut.

Despite his inexperience, manager Lou Piniella showed a willingness to use Hart as the Cubs progressed through the stretch run of a pennant race, and he appeared in several close games in September. He was impressive enough during his limited time to be chosen as one of the 11 pitchers on the team's playoff roster. Hart made 8 appearances in September's stretch playoff run. He held a 0.82 ERA with 11 innings pitched, 13 strikeouts, and held batters to a .189 batting average.

After spring training in 2009, he was sent to the Triple A Iowa Cubs.

Hart made his first start of 2009, on July 8, against the Atlanta Braves at Wrigley Field. In that game, Hart pitched five innings and allowed only four hits and one run, but was the losing pitcher, as the Cubs lost 4–1. Hart was optioned to the Single-A Peoria Chiefs after the game in order to continue to pitch on his regular schedule while the Cubs were on the All-Star break. He was recalled on July 19.

On July 19, 2009, Hart recorded his first career Major League hit and his first career RBI. During a 7-run 4th inning against the Washington Nationals at Nationals Park, Hart, squaring around as if to sacrifice bunt, pulled his bat back and lined a pitch from Garrett Mock into center field, driving in Mike Fontenot from second base, and thwarting the Nationals' defensive attempt to execute a wheel play. Hart would later score himself during the inning on a sacrifice fly by Ryan Theriot. Hart pitched five innings and recorded his first win of the 2009 season in that game, as the Cubs went on to win 11–3, completing a four-game sweep of the Nationals.

=== Pittsburgh Pirates ===
On July 30, 2009, Hart was traded to the Pittsburgh Pirates along with right-handed pitcher José Ascanio and third baseman Josh Harrison for left-handed pitchers John Grabow and Tom Gorzelanny. Just hours before the trade Hart started for the Cubs against the Houston Astros, he went six innings and gave up three earned runs while recording his third win of the season.

He would go on to have shoulder surgery in May 2010 and spend all of the 2010 and 2011 seasons on the MLB disabled list. He missed the rest of the season and all of the 2011 season. He was sent outright to Triple-A Indianapolis Indians on October 31, 2011. He became a free agent following the season on November 2.

=== Southern Maryland Blue Crabs ===
On August 2, 2012, Hart signed with the Southern Maryland Blue Crabs of the Atlantic League of Professional Baseball. He would retire from baseball after the 2012 season. In 21 games (1 start) he threw 24 innings going 1-1 with a 2.25 ERA with 22 strikeouts and 1 save.
