= Jimmy Barthmaier =

American baseball player (born 1984)

- Pitcher
- Born: January 6, 1984 (age 41); Atlanta, Georgia, U.S.
- Batted: Right Threw: Right

MLB debut
- June 27, 2008, for the Pittsburgh Pirates

Last MLB appearance
- September 27, 2008, for the Pittsburgh Pirates

MLB statistics
- Win–loss record: 0–2
- Earned run average: 10.45
- Strikeouts: 6
- Stats at Baseball Reference

Teams
- Pittsburgh Pirates (2008)

James Richard Barthmaier (/ˈbɑːrθmaɪ.ər/; born January 6, 1984) is an American former professional baseball pitcher. He played in Major League Baseball (MLB) for the Pittsburgh Pirates in 2008.

== Professional career ==
=== Houston Astros ===
Barthmaier was drafted by the Houston Astros in the 13th round (389th overall) of the 2003 Major League Baseball draft out of Roswell High School in Roswell, Georgia. At the time, he was the first player drafted out of Roswell High School since the Kansas City Royals drafted Ken Ray in 1993. In 2005, with the Lexington Legends, Barthmaier was a South Atlantic League Mid-Season All Star, a SAL Post-Season All Star, and a Baseball America Low-A All Star. Barhmaier also won SAL pitcher of the week twice, June 12 and August 7, 2005. In 2005, Barthmaier pitched one game for the Salem Avalanche of the Carolina League, pitching six innings in relief. Barthmaier spent the 2006 season with Salem, pitching 146 2/3 innings with a 3.62 ERA. He won Carolina League pitcher of the week on August 20, 2006.

=== Pittsburgh Pirates ===
The Pittsburgh Pirates claimed Barthmaier on waivers on November 20, 2007. He made his Major League Baseball debut with Pittsburgh on June 27, 2008. He took the loss, giving up 7 runs in 2 1/3 innings against the Tampa Bay Rays; giving up home runs to Evan Longoria and Eric Hinske, but striking out Scott Kazmir and Carlos Peña. Coming into the 2009 season, Barthmaier was rated the number 12 prospect in the Pirates’ farm system by Baseball America. After facing two batters, Barthmaier exited his first 2009 start with an elbow injury that required Tommy John surgery. During the 2009 and 2010 spring trainings, he was sent to the team's Triple-A affiliate, the Indianapolis Indians. On May 26, 2010, Barthmaier was assigned to the Pirates' Single-A affiliate, the Bradenton Marauders. He appeared in two games for the Marauders, allowing a run in three innings. Barthmaier was later assigned to the Pirates' Double-A affiliate, the Altoona Curve, on June 2. He appeared in five games for the Curve, allowing 4 earned runs in 3 innings. The Pirates released Barthmaier on June 23.

=== Washington Nationals ===
The Washington Nationals signed Barthmaier on June 29, 2010. He finished the 2010 season with the GCL Nationals in the Gulf Coast League and the Potomac Nationals of the Carolina League. In 2011, Barthmaier pitched for the Double-A Harrisburg Senators, posting a 5.05 ERA in 67 2/3 innings.
