= Marino Salas =

Dominican baseball player (born 1981)

- Starting pitcher
- Born: October 2, 1981 (age 44); Hato Mayor del Rey, Dominican Republic
- Batted: Right Threw: Right

MLB debut
- May 13, 2008, for the Pittsburgh Pirates

Last MLB appearance
- September 15, 2008, for the Pittsburgh Pirates

MLB statistics
- Win–loss record: 1–0
- Earned run average: 8.47
- Strikeouts: 9
- Stats at Baseball Reference

Teams
- Pittsburgh Pirates (2008)

Marino Salas Ortega (born October 2, 1981) is a Dominican former Major League Baseball relief pitcher, now playing for the Athletics Bologna in the Italian Serie A Federale.

== Career ==
Salas was previously claimed off waivers from the Baltimore Orioles by the Milwaukee Brewers on February 1, 2007. He played for Milwaukee's Double-A and Triple-A clubs, the Huntsville Stars and the Nashville Sounds. On December 7, 2007, Salas was traded to the Pittsburgh Pirates along with Kevin Roberts for Salomón Torres. He became a free agent at the end of the 2008 season.

He also played in Italy for BSC Rovigo, as a starting pitcher.

On August 1, 2015, he pitched a no-hitter against Grosseto at the Jannella Stadium, in a playoff game.
