= Wheel play =

Defensive strategy in baseball

The wheel play is a defensive strategy in baseball designed to defend against a sacrifice bunt. The play's name derives from the wheel-like rotation of the infielders.

== Context ==
The wheel play is typically only employed when all of the following conditions exist:

- The score of the game is close (e.g. the score is tied or either team has a one-run lead).
- The offense has a baserunner at second base (a runner also may be at first base).
- The batting team has no outs.

In such a scenario, the batting team may attempt a sacrifice bunt to move the runner at second base to third base, accepting that the batter will be put out at first base. If that happens, the offense would then have a runner at third base with one out, and that runner could subsequently score on a sacrifice fly.

To defend against this scenario, the wheel play is used by the defense in an attempt to prevent the offense from advancing the runner at second base to third base via a sacrifice bunt.

== Defensive description ==

The wheel play is a bunt-defense strategy designed to force out or tag out the lead runner at third base. In contrast, many other bunt defense strategies prioritize getting an out at first base.

The wheel play begins with the shortstop running to cover (defend) third base. As the pitch is thrown by the pitcher, the third baseman and first baseman rush toward home plate, to be in position to field the bunted ball as quickly as possible, while the second baseman runs to cover (defend) first base. Additionally, the pitcher moves into a defensive position, backing up one of the inrushing fielders (which one, usually depends on toward which direction the pitcher's pitching motion carries him).

The defense seeks to have defenders in position such that once the ball is bunted, it can be picked up quickly by one of the charging fielders, who will be much closer to the batter than he would be in his normal fielding position. If that occurs, the fielder who picks up the ball can throw it to the shortstop (who is covering third base) to retire the runner advancing from second base, either via a force play (when applicable) or tag out. Recording an out at third base represents a successfully executed wheel play. Additionally, if the batter is not a fast runner, the shortstop (at third base) may be able to throw to the second baseman (at first base) to successfully complete a double play.

Alternately, if a fielder is slow in picking up the ball and/or he sees that the runner advancing from second base is unlikely to be retired at third base, the fielder can throw the ball to the second baseman (who is covering first base) to retire the batter. While this is not a successfully executed wheel play, it provides no worse an outcome than would have occurred on a normally executed sacrifice bunt.

== Offensive countermeasures ==
The offense can attempt to defeat the wheel play:

- If the offense suspects the defense will employ the wheel play and sees the shortstop start to run towards third base too early or too late, the runner at second base may simply attempt to steal third base.
  - If the shortstop leaves too early, the runner on second base can take a significant lead (a "walking lead") away from second base and be much of the way to third base by the time the catcher receives the pitch.
  - If the shortstop leaves too late, the runner on second base runs with an expectation that the shortstop cannot get into position near third base quickly enough to receive a throw from the catcher and apply a tag successfully.
  - In either of the above scenarios, the effort by the catcher to throw to a moving target (the shortstop) opens the possibility of an error, permitting additional advancement on the bases. Thus, the pitcher may attempt pickoff throws to second base, to keep the runner there from taking a large lead.
- The offense can have its runner(s) start to run and instruct the batter to execute a "slash bunt" (alternately called a "butcher boy", "slug bunt", or "slap hit"). In a slash bunt, the batter appears to be preparing to bunt, but actually pulls the bat back and swings in full as the pitch arrives. The batter's objective is to hit the ball through the vacated middle of the infield, allowing all runners to advance (potentially multiple bases).
  - Because the batter has to move the bat so much, and since players called upon to bunt are often the weaker hitters on a team, this effort commonly results in a swinging strike or foul ball.
  - Defenses generally do not attempt the wheel play in bunt situations where the batter is deemed a good enough hitter to be able to execute a slash bunt. Instead, the infielders hold their positions, and the defense relies on the pitcher or catcher to field the ball and concede an advancement of the runner at second base to third base if the bunt is well executed.

== History ==
One of the earliest recorded instances of the wheel play being used in Major League Baseball (MLB) was by the Pittsburgh Pirates against the St. Louis Cardinals on August 14, 1960, resulting, as reported by The Pittsburgh Press, in "an electrifying double play [...] that had the 36,775 fans screaming." Several Pirate players and coaches said they had never seen the play before, but the Pirate players who executed the play attributed the original idea to former Chicago Cubs manager Charlie Grimm, whom they thought used it in 1950.

The Cardinals successfully used the wheel play against the Texas Rangers in the second inning of game 6 of the 2011 World Series. With runners on first base and second base and no outs, Texas pitcher Colby Lewis attempted a sacrifice bunt, resulting in a double play when third baseman David Freese fielded the bunt, threw to shortstop Rafael Furcal at third base for the first out, and Furcal threw to second baseman Nick Punto at first base for the second out.

On October 6, 2025, the Los Angeles Dodgers successfully completed the wheel play against the Philadelphia Phillies in the bottom of the ninth inning of game 2 of the National League Division Series. With a runner on second base, third baseman Max Muncy rushed home plate, fielded the ball, and perfectly threw to shortstop Mookie Betts, who covered third base.
