= Luis Dorante =

- Manager / Coach
- Born: October 25, 1968 (age 58); Coro, Falcón, Venezuela
- Bats: Right Throws: Right
- Stats at Baseball Reference

Luis A. Dorante (born October 25, 1968, at Coro, Falcón, Venezuela) is the current manager of the Pulaski Yankees in the New York Yankees organization. He has also managed in the Venezuelan Professional Baseball League (LVBP), winning three manager of the year awards.

== Career ==
He had previously served as the Pittsburgh Pirates bullpen coach from 2008 through 2010, as well as with the Florida Marlins in the same capacity during the 2005 campaign.

Dorante spent the 2007 season as the Manager of the Jupiter Hammerheads, the Marlins Class-A affiliate in the Florida State League and also managed in the Dominican Republic during the 2007 off-season.

Prior to managing the AA Carolina Mudcats in 2006, Dorante spent three seasons at the helm with Jupiter. In that time, he produced a 221-190 record, which included an 81-57 mark in 2002, the most victories by Jupiter in a single season. Luis led the Hammerheads to the playoffs twice in those three seasons. In 2003, he led the club to a combined 76-62 record, which included a 42-28 mark and a first-place finish in the first half. Luis shared post-season FSL Manager-of-the-Year honors in both 2002 and 2003.

Dorante began his managerial career within the Montreal Expos system in the Gulf Coast League in 1995. He was a coach with the GCL Expos in 1996, a club which posted a league-best 41-18 record and a first-place finish, only to lose in the first round of the playoffs. After three seasons with the GCL Expos (also managed in 1997), he led the Cape Fear Crocs to an overall record of 80-61 and a post-season appearance in 1998.

Luis also managed Jupiter again in 1999 and 2000 while the club was affiliated with the Montreal Expos.

In 11 seasons as a minor league skipper, Dorante led his team to the playoffs four times and compiled an overall record of 671-696.

Primarily a catcher during his playing days, Luis also made appearances at first base, third base and in the outfield during his six-year minor league career. He batted and threw right-handed, stood 6 feet (1.8 m) tall and weighed 165 pounds (75 kg). He played in a total of 221 games from 1987 thru 1993 in the Boston organization after being signed as a non-drafted free agent on September 15, 1986. Dorante missed the 1992 season, but finished his playing career as a player/coach with the Fort Lauderdale Red Sox in 1993. Following his playing career, Dorante joined the Expos organization and worked as a Venezuelan scout in 1994.

== Family ==
His son Luis Dorante Jr. works as the official Spanish interpreter in the Marlin's organization.
