= Tom Gorzelanny =

American baseball player (born 1982)

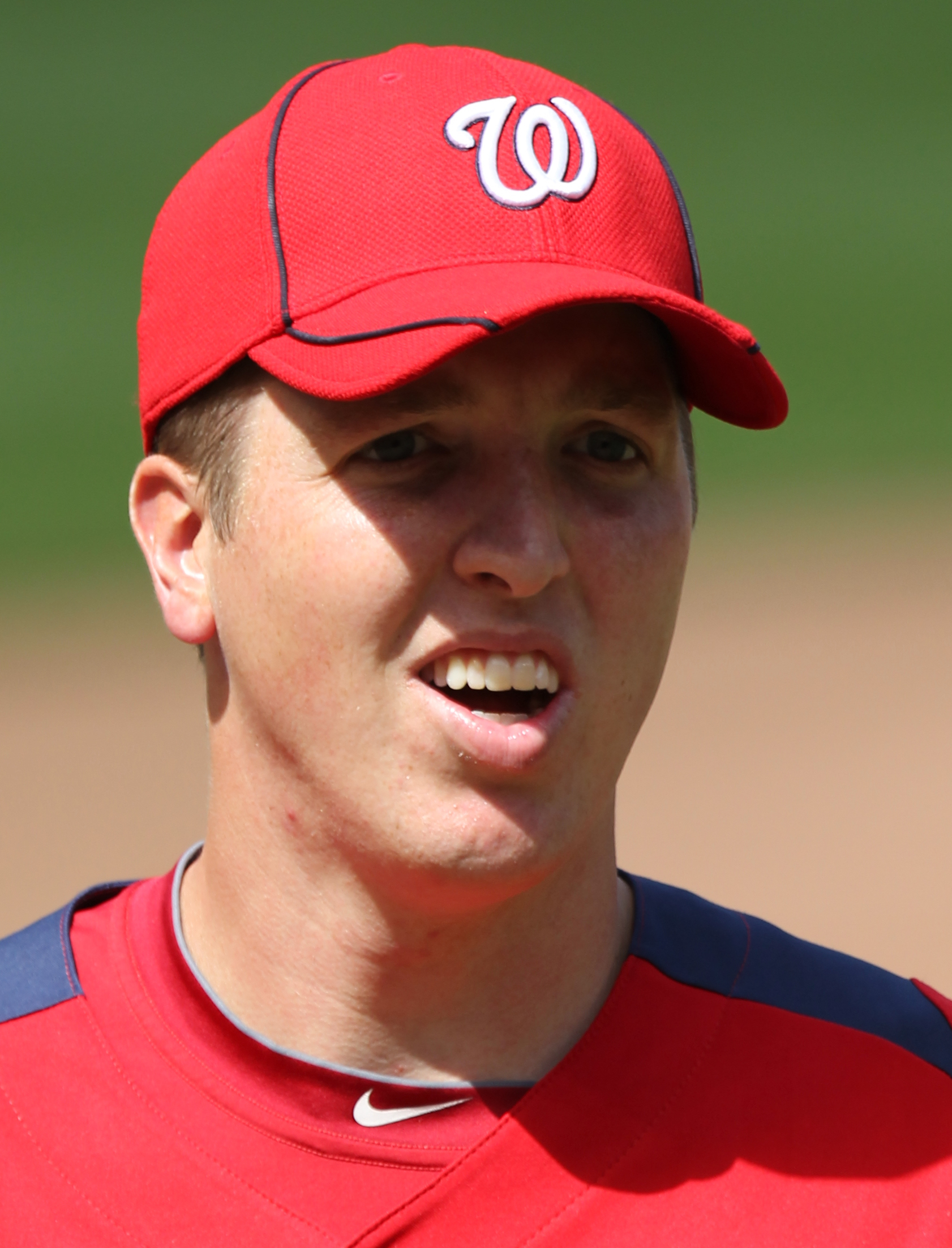
- Gorzelanny with the Washington Nationals in 2011
- Pitcher
- Born: July 12, 1982 (age 44); Evergreen Park, Illinois, U.S.
- Batted: Right Threw: Left

MLB debut
- September 20, 2005, for the Pittsburgh Pirates

Last MLB appearance
- July 3, 2016, for the Cleveland Indians

MLB statistics
- Win–loss record: 50–53
- Earned run average: 4.40
- Strikeouts: 714
- Stats at Baseball Reference

Teams
- Pittsburgh Pirates (2005–2009); Chicago Cubs (2009–2010); Washington Nationals (2011–2012); Milwaukee Brewers (2013–2014); Detroit Tigers (2015); Cleveland Indians (2016)

Thomas Stephen Gorzelanny (born July 12, 1982) is an American former professional baseball pitcher who is currently the rehab pitching coordinator for the Arizona Diamondbacks. He played in Major League Baseball (MLB) for the Pittsburgh Pirates, Chicago Cubs, Washington Nationals, Milwaukee Brewers, Detroit Tigers and Cleveland Indians.

== Early life ==
Thomas Stephen Gorzelanny was born to Susan and Bob Gorzelanny in Evergreen Park, Illinois, and grew up in Chicago and Oak Forest, Illinois. He graduated from Marist High School in 2000.

== Professional career ==
=== Pittsburgh Pirates ===
Gorzelanny was drafted in the 38th round of the 2000 MLB draft by the Chicago White Sox but chose to play college baseball rather than immediately pursuing a professional career. He redshirted in his first year at University of Kansas and posted 3–7 record with a 5.90 earned run average as a freshman with the Kansas Jayhawks. He transferred to Triton College and was drafted in the second round (45th overall) of the 2003 MLB draft by the Pittsburgh Pirates.

Gorzelanny began his career in 2005 with the Double-A Altoona Curve. He made his Major League debut with the Pirates in September, starting against the Houston Astros and pitching 4 1/3 innings, receiving the loss. At the beginning of the 2006 season, he was optioned to Triple-A Indianapolis Indians. Gorzelanny was selected to play for the US team in the 2006 All-Star Futures Game, but was ineligible due to being called up by the Pirates. On June 29, 2006, the Pirates called Gorzelanny up to replace Oliver Pérez in the starting rotation. He made his season debut on July 1, 2006, against the Detroit Tigers. In 11 games, he was 2–5 with a 3.79 ERA.

Gorzelanny earned a regular spot in the rotation in the 2007 season. He was one of five players in the National League that would be chosen from a final fan vote for the last spot on the NL roster for the 2007 MLB All-Star Game. Gorzelanny went on to compile a 14–10 season for the Pirates, leading the Pirates in wins and finishing with over 200 innings and an ERA of 3.88. He had his first shutout on Aug 12, 2007 against the San Francisco Giants allowing only 5 hits and 1 walk.

After a difficult start to the first half of the season, Gorzelanny was optioned to Triple-A Indianapolis in July. He was recalled to Pittsburgh several weeks later after a successful tenure in Indianapolis, but ultimately failed to regain his 2007 form. He finished the 2008 season 6–9 with a 6.66 ERA.

After Spring Training, Gorzelanny began the 2009 season at Triple-A Indianapolis. In May, he was recalled to pitch from the bullpen after injuries to the Pirates' roster. He was optioned back to Triple-A after several weeks with Pittsburgh. In nine appearances with Pittsburgh, he was 3–1 with a 5.19 ERA.

=== Chicago Cubs ===
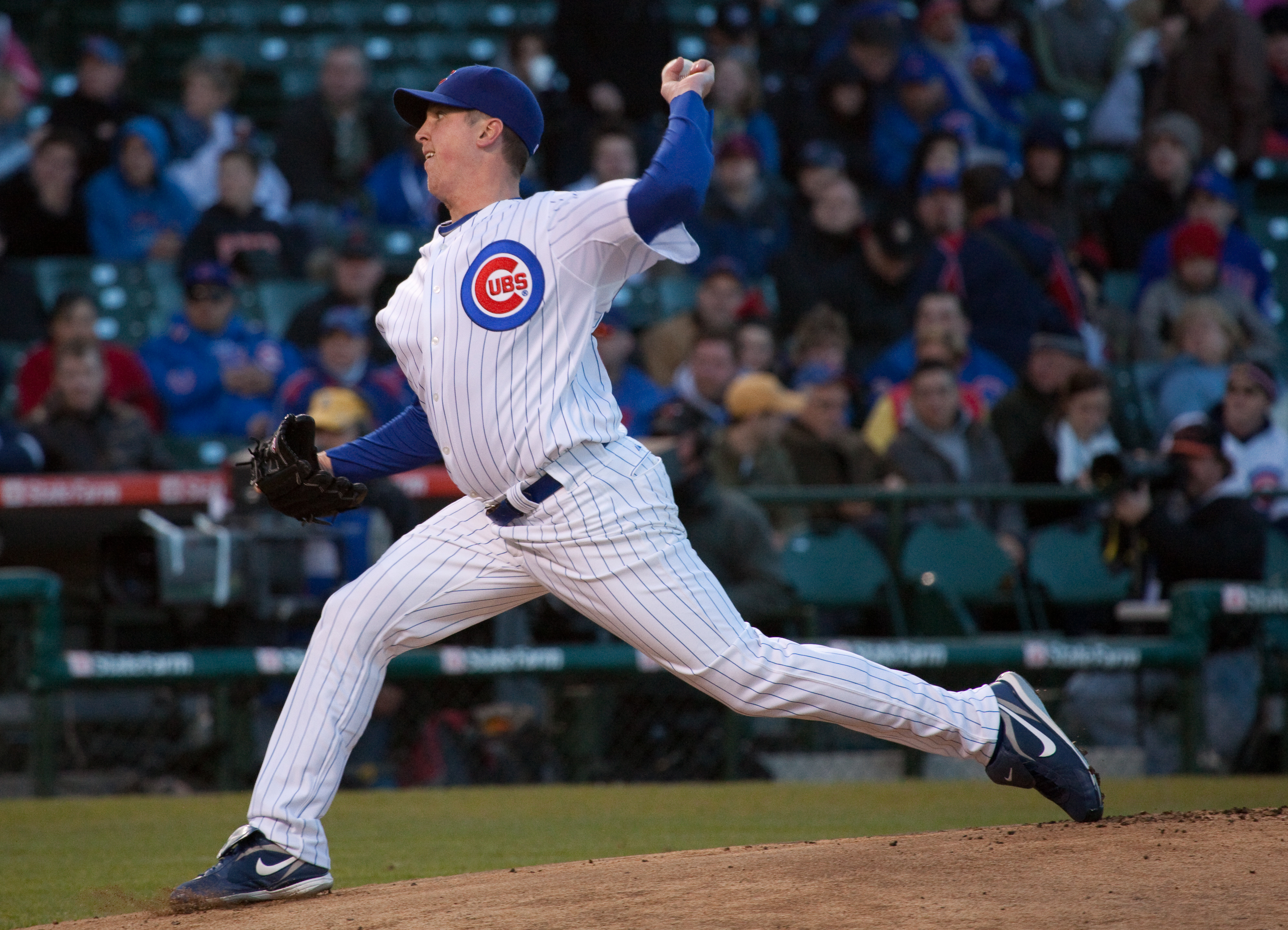
Gorzelanny pitching for the Chicago Cubs in 2010.

Gorzelanny was traded on July 30, 2009, to the Chicago Cubs along with John Grabow for Kevin Hart, José Ascanio, and minor league third baseman Josh Harrison, and assigned to the Chicago Cubs Triple-A affiliate, the Iowa Cubs. He was called up to start on August 4, 2009, and got his first win as a Cub. He went on to make seven starts for the Cubs, earning a record of 4–2 and ending the season in the bullpen. Between the Pirates and the Cubs, he was 7–3 with a 5.55 ERA in 2009.

In 2010, Gorzelanny won a spot in the Cubs starting rotation. In late May, he was moved to the bullpen to accommodate the return of Carlos Zambrano to the Cubs rotation. On June 26, 2010, Cubs manager Lou Piniella announced that Zambrano would move back to the bullpen, and Gorzelanny would regain a spot in the Cubs rotation. Even after Zambrano made his second return to the rotation after undergoing anger management therapy, Gorzelanny kept his spot in the rotation. In 29 appearances, including 23 starts, in 2010, he was 7–9 with a 4.09 ERA.

=== Washington Nationals ===
On January 17, 2011, the Washington Nationals acquired Gorzelanny from the Cubs for prospects Michael Burgess, A. J. Morris, and Graham Hicks. Gorzelanny became expendable to the Cubs after they traded for Matt Garza ten days earlier.

On May 28, 2011, Gorzelanny was placed on the 15-day disabled list with left elbow inflammation. After coming off the DL, he was less consistent and was removed from the rotation, and was used in long relief out of the bullpen. He started in 15 games for the Nationals and pitched in 15 more in 2011, compiling a 4–6 record and a 4.03 ERA.

In 2012, Gorzelanny pitched almost exclusively out of the Nationals bullpen; he started one game, the second to last game of the season, and received a no decision. In 45 appearances in 2012, 44 of them out of the bullpen, Gorzelanny was 4–2 with a 2.88 ERA over 72 innings. He became a free agent following the season.

=== Milwaukee Brewers ===
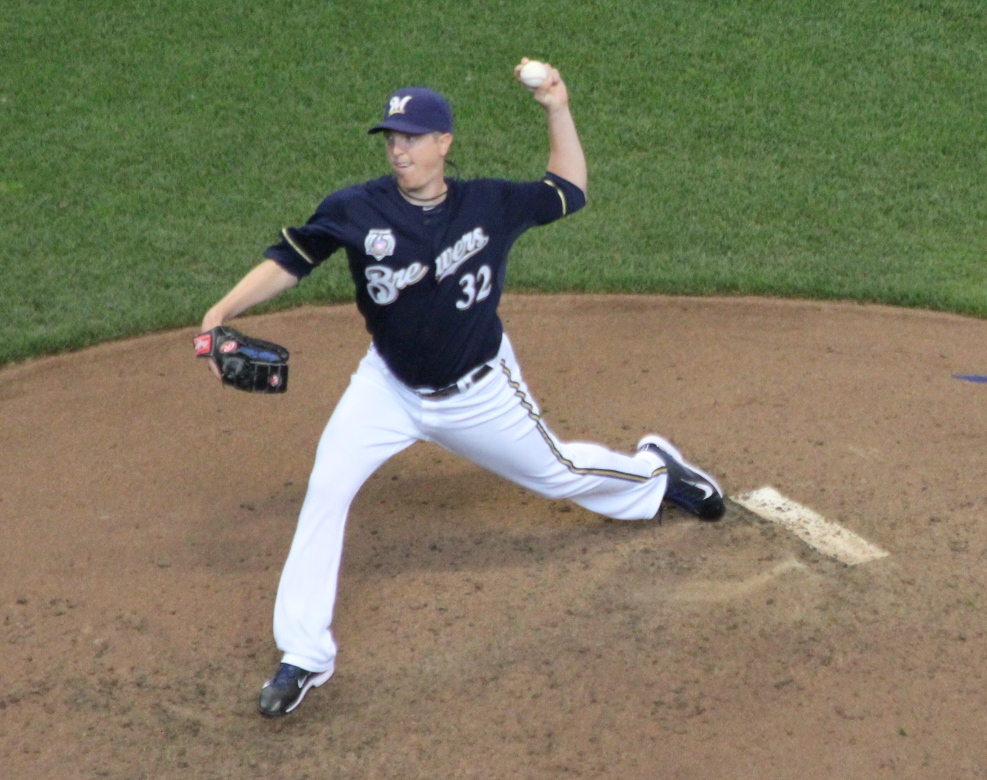
Gorzelanny pitching for the Milwaukee Brewers in 2014.

On December 20, 2012, the Milwaukee Brewers and Gorzelanny agreed to a two-year contract. The deal became official on December 21, 2012. As of the 2013 All-Star Break, Gorzelanny was having the best season of his career, statistically speaking. He entered the break with a 1.88 ERA in 35 appearances, three of them starts. He became a free agent following the 2014 season.

=== Detroit Tigers ===
On January 6, 2015, Gorzelanny signed a one-year contract with the Detroit Tigers. He was designated for assignment by the Tigers on July 3. Gorzelanny gave up 17 runs on 32 hits over 24 innings, walking 15 and striking out 19. Opponents batted .390 on balls put in play. On July 8, he was outrighted to the Triple-A Toledo Mud Hens. He had his contract selected to the major league roster again on August 9. He became a free agent following the season.

=== Cleveland Indians ===
On December 21, 2015, Gorzelanny signed a minor league contract, that included an invitation to major league spring training with the Cleveland Indians. He opened the 2016 season with the Columbus Clippers, and was promoted to the major leagues on June 1. He was designated for assignment on July 4 and subsequently outrighted to Columbus on July 8. On July 9, Gorzelanny declined the outright assignment and became a free agent.

=== Baltimore Orioles ===
On July 24, 2016, the Baltimore Orioles signed Gorzelanny to a minor league contract. He was released on August 13, 2016.

=== New York Mets ===
On February 3, 2017, Gorzelanny signed a minor league contract with the New York Mets. Gorzelanny made 9 appearances split between the rookie–level Gulf Coast League Mets, High–A St. Lucie Mets, and Triple–A Las Vegas 51s, accumulating a 7.04 ERA with 9 strikeouts and 1 save in 7 2/3 innings of work. He elected free agency following the season on November 6.

== Coaching career ==
On January 28, 2019, Gorzelanny was named pitching coach of the University of Iowa Hawkeyes baseball team and remained there until 2022. He joined the Arizona Diamondbacks' farm system not long after.

In 2024, he was named as pitching coach for the Amarillo Sod Poodles the Double-A affiliate of the Arizona Diamondbacks. He has also served as pitching coach for the A-ball Hillsboro Hops of the Northwest League.

== Pitching style ==
Gorzelanny features five pitches: a four-seam fastball (89–92), a two-seam fastball (89–92), a changeup (84–86), a slider (79–82), and a curveball (78–81). Right-handed hitters see mostly a combination of the two-seamer and changeup, while left-handers see a mix of all of his pitches except the changeup.

== Personal life ==
Gorzelanny and his wife, Lindsey, welcomed their first child in 2010. and a second in 2013.
