= Mizrahi (surname) =

Mizrahi (or Mizrachi) is a Sephardic surname, given to Jews who got to the Iberian Peninsula from the east, or Jews who lived on the eastern side of the peninsula. Notable people with the surname include:

- Alon Mizrahi (born 1971), Israeli association football player
- Avi Mizrahi (born 1957), Israeli general
- Baruch Mizrahi, (1926–1948), Muslim convert to Judaism, Irgun fighter
- Elijah Mizrachi (c. 1455–1525), rabbi and author of the supercommentary on Rashi known as The Mizrachi
- Isaac Mizrahi (born 1961), American fashion designer
- Joseph Misrahi (1895–1975), Egyptian Olympic fencer
- Michael Mizrachi (born 1981), American professional poker player
- Moshe Mizrahi (politician) (1950–2022), Israeli politician
- Moshe Mizrahi (basketball) (born 1980), Israeli basketball player
- Moshé Mizrahi (1931–2018), Israeli film director
- Motti Mizrachi (born 1946), Israeli artist
- Offer Mizrahi (born 1967), Israeli association football player
- Rasela Mizrahi, Macedonian politician
- Robert Mizrachi (born 1978), American professional poker player
- Shimon Mizrahi (born 1939), Israeli basketball executive, Israel Prize recipient
- Sylvain Mizrahi (1951–2021), known professionally as Sylvain Sylvain, American rock guitarist
- Togo Mizrahi (1901–1986), Egyptian Film Pioneer
- Yosef Mizrachi (born 1968) Haredi rabbi and public speaker
- Yossi Mizrahi (born 1953), Israeli association football player and manager

== Fictional characters from Xenosaga ==
- Joachim Mizrahi
- Juli Mizrahi
- MOMO Mizrahi (Xenosaga)
- Sakura Mizrahi
