= Phil Dumatrait =

American baseball player (born 1981)

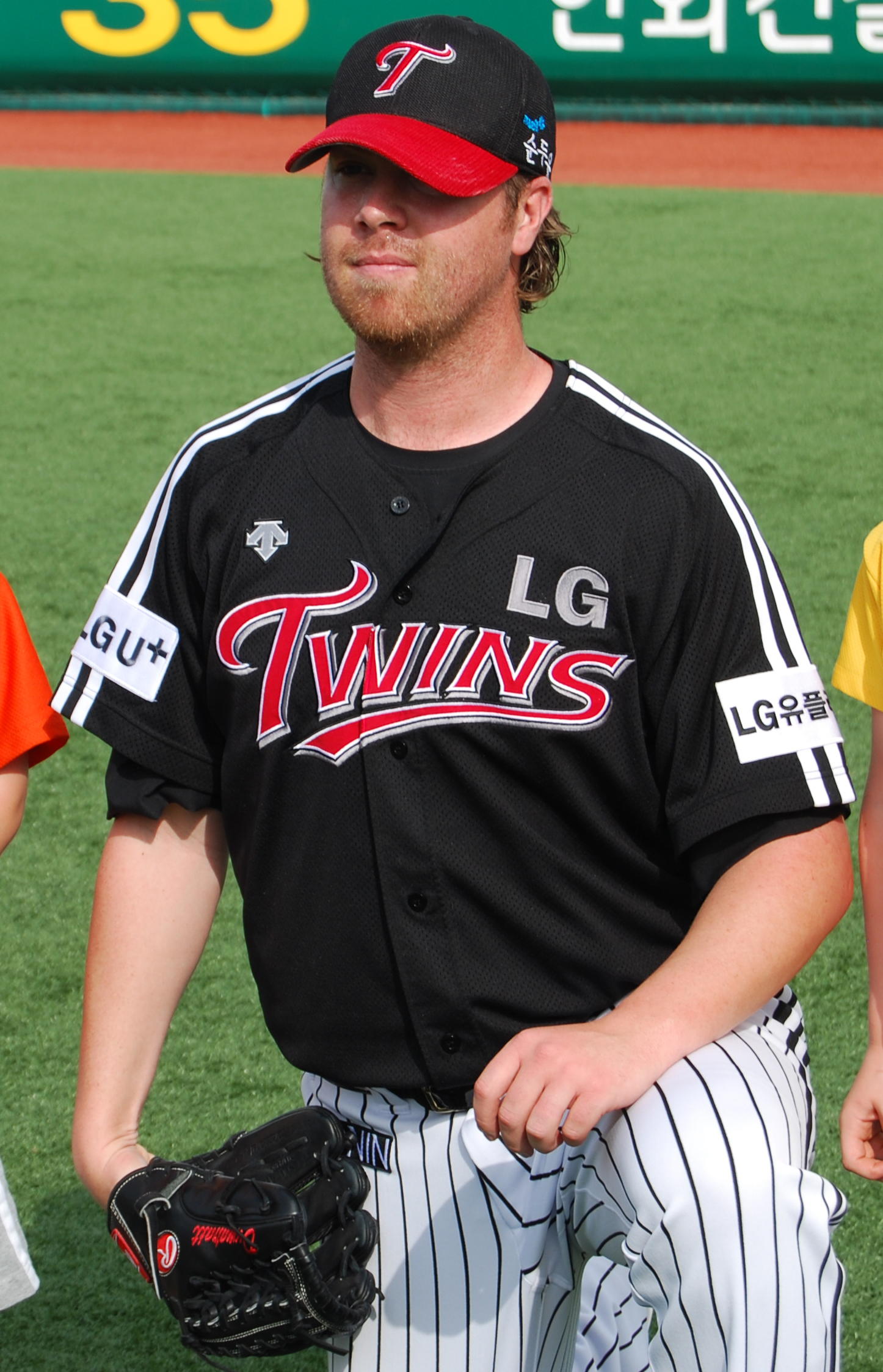
- Dumatrait with the LG Twins in 2010
- Pitcher
- Born: July 12, 1981 (age 45); Bakersfield, California, U.S.
- Batted: Right Threw: Left

Professional debut
- MLB: August 2, 2007, for the Cincinnati Reds
- KBO: May 27, 2010, for the LG Twins

Last appearance
- MLB: September 26, 2011, for the Minnesota Twins
- KBO: August 19, 2010, for the LG Twins

MLB statistics
- Win–loss record: 4–13
- Earned run average: 6.20
- Strikeouts: 97

KBO statistics
- Win-loss record: 4-6
- Earned run average: 8.22
- Strikeouts: 29
- Stats at Baseball Reference

Teams
- Cincinnati Reds (2007); Pittsburgh Pirates (2008–2009); LG Twins (2010); Minnesota Twins (2011)

Phillip Anthony Dumatrait (born July 12, 1981) is an American former professional baseball pitcher. He played in Major League Baseball (MLB) for the Cincinnati Reds, Pittsburgh Pirates, and Minnesota Twins, and in the KBO League for the LG Twins.

== Early life ==
Born in Bakersfield, California, Dumatrait played for Bakersfield College before he was drafted by the Boston Red Sox in the 2000 Major League Baseball draft.

== Baseball career ==
=== Cincinnati Reds ===
On July 30, 2003, the Red Sox traded Dumatrait, left-hander Tyler Pelland and cash considerations to the Cincinnati Reds in exchange for right-handed relief pitcher Scott Williamson. Dumatrait spent a majority of his minor league career in the Reds organization with Double-A Chattanooga Lookouts and Triple-A Louisville Bats.

In 2004, Dumatrait suffered a season-ending elbow injury and underwent Tommy John surgery.

In 2007, Dumatrait made his major league debut with the Cincinnati Reds.

=== Pittsburgh Pirates ===
The Pittsburgh Pirates claimed him off waivers on October 26, 2007. He started the 2008 season as a reliever, but became a starter when Matt Morris was released. He gained his first major league victory on May 7, 2008, against the San Francisco Giants, pitching 5 2/3 shutout innings in the 3–1 Pirates victory. Dumatrait missed the last several months of the season because of an arm injury and opted to have surgery performed.

On September 19, 2009, the Pirates announced their intention to option Dumatrait to their Triple-A affiliate, the Indianapolis Indians. Dumatrait was non-tendered after the 2009 season and became a free agent.

=== LG Twins ===
On December 19, 2009, Dumatrait signed a minor league contract with the Detroit Tigers that included an invitation to spring training.

On May 19, 2010, Dumatrait signed with LG Twins of the KBO League.

=== Minnesota Twins ===
On November 17, 2010, Dumatrait signed a minor league deal with an invitation to spring training with the Minnesota Twins. He had his contract purchased by the Twins on May 15, 2011. He declared for free agency on October 21.

On November 16, 2011, Dumatrait re-signed with the Twins organization on a minor league contract. Dumatrait retired on May 29, 2012.
