= Franquelis Osoria =

Dominican baseball player (born 1981)

- Relief pitcher
- Born: September 12, 1981 (age 45); Santiago, Dominican Republic
- Batted: Right Threw: Right

MLB debut
- June 7, 2005, for the Los Angeles Dodgers

Last MLB appearance
- July 30, 2008, for the Pittsburgh Pirates

MLB statistics
- Win–loss record: 4–9
- Earned run average: 5.48
- Strikeouts: 72
- Stats at Baseball Reference

Teams
- Los Angeles Dodgers (2005–2006); Pittsburgh Pirates (2007–2008)

Franquelis Antonio Osoria (born September 12, 1981) is a Dominican former professional baseball pitcher. He played in Major League Baseball (MLB) for the Los Angeles Dodgers and Pittsburgh Pirates.

== Career ==
Osoria was signed by the Los Angeles Dodgers on December 28, 1999. He would spend the first six seasons of his professional career in the minor leagues.

=== Minor-league career ===
In 2002, Osoria pitched most of the season for the South Georgia Waves in the South Atlantic League, pitching to a 3.32 ERA in 43 1/3 innings pitched. He would get called up to the Vero Beach Dodgers in the Florida State League near the end of the season. In 2003, he would pitch the full season for the Vero Beach Dodgers, pitching to a 4.08 ERA, 6 saves, and 3 starts in 75 innings pitched. He would not start a game again after the 2003 season.

2004 would see Osoira promoted to the Jacksonville Suns of the Southern League. Osoria would pitch to an 8–5 record, 5 saves, and a 3.56 ERA in 81 innings. Late in the season, he would be promoted to the Las Vegas 51s of the Pacific Coast League, where he would pitch to a 6.48 ERA in 8.1 innings.

2005 would be Osoria's last season in the minor leagues before getting the call to the majors. Starting the year with the 51s, Osoria would pitch to a 2.95 ERA in 55 innings, amassing a 6–4 record and 9 saves.

=== Major-league career ===
Osoria made his Major League Baseball debut with the Los Angeles Dodgers on June 7, 2005. In the major leagues, Osoria was primarily used as a long reliever, as Osoria would average just under four outs per appearance for his major-league career.

==== Los Angeles Dodgers ====
With the Dodgers in 2005, Osoria would pitch to a 3.94 ERA in 29 2/3 innings pitched in 24 games.

Osoria would start the season with the big-league club in 2006. However, Osoria would struggle to a 7.13 ERA in 17 2/3 innings pitched before being sent down to the Las Vegas 51s. Osoria would pitch the remainder of the season for the 51s, with Osoria's last major league appearance of the season coming on May 10 against the Houston Astros. Osoria would pitch the remainder of the 2006 season for the 51s, pitching to a 2–2 record, 2 saves, and a 5.40 ERA in 51 2/3 innings pitched with the 51s.

==== Pittsburgh Pirates ====
On December 12, 2006, the Pittsburgh Pirates claimed Osoria off of waivers. After spending most of the season with the Pirates' Triple-A club in Indianapolis, going 2–5 with a 2.63 ERA in 39 games as a reliever, he was called up by the Pirates on August 4, 2007. With the Pirates in 2007, Osoria would pitch to a 4.76 ERA in 28 1/3 innings pitched, going 0–2.

Osoria would pitch for most of the first half of the Pirates' 2008 season. Osoria got his first major-league victory against the Atlanta Braves on March 31, 2008. Osoria pitched 3 innings and gave up 2 runs in the game. Osoria would set a career high in innings pitched in 2008, pitching 60 2/3 innings pitched to a 4–3 record and a 6.08 ERA. Osoria's 6.08 ERA and .335 opposing batting average were both the highest among all qualified relievers in 2008.

On July 31, 2008, Osoria was designated for assignment after the Pirates traded Jason Bay for four players. Osoria would clear waivers and be outrighted to the Indianapolis Indians, where he would pitch to a 3.55 ERA, a 2–1 record, and 1 save in 12 2/3 innings pitched. At the conclusion of the 2008 major league season, Osoria was granted free agency on October 15. July 30, 2008 marks his last pitching appearance in the major leagues.

==== Kansas City Royals ====
On November 30, 2008, he signed a minor league contract with the Kansas City Royals.

Osoria would pitch the remainder of his career in the Dominican Winter League, pitching for various teams between 2008 and 2015.

== Personal life ==
Like fellow reliever Antonio Alfonseca, Osoria has an extra digit on his throwing hand.
