= Yoslan Herrera =

Cuban baseball player (born 1981)

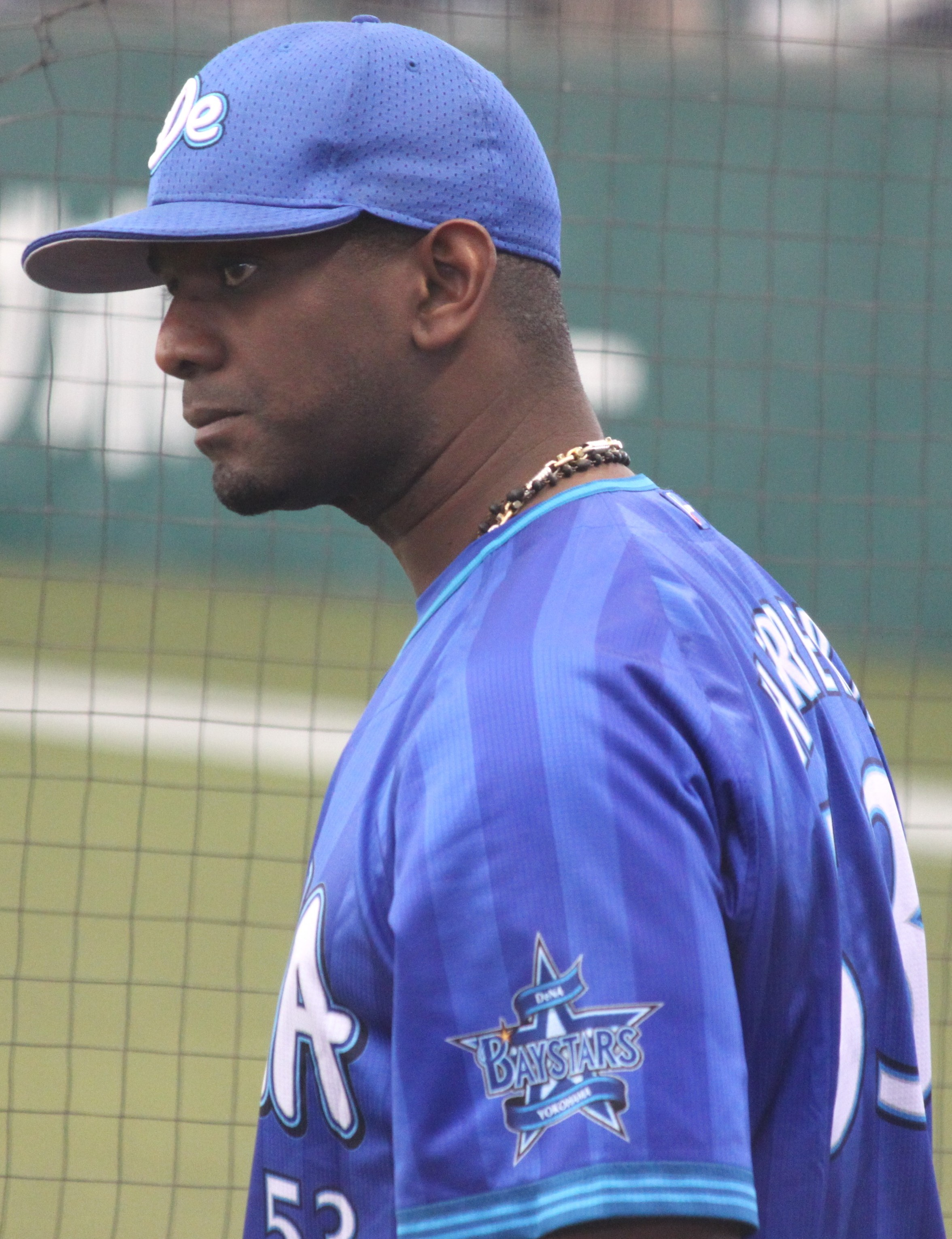
- March 22, 2015 in Seibu Prince Dome
- Pitcher
- Born: April 28, 1981 (age 45); Pinar del Rio, Cuba
- Batted: Right Threw: Right

MLB debut
- July 12, 2008, for the Pittsburgh Pirates

Last appearance
- September 28, 2014, for the Los Angeles Angels of Anaheim

MLB statistics
- Win–loss record: 2–2
- Earned run average: 6.43
- Strikeouts: 23

NPB statistics
- Win–loss record: 5–4
- Earned run average: 2.96
- Strikeouts: 53
- Stats at Baseball Reference

Teams
- Pittsburgh Pirates (2008); Los Angeles Angels of Anaheim (2014); Yokohama DeNA BayStars (2015)

Yoslan Herrera (born April 28, 1981) is a Cuban former professional baseball pitcher. He has also played for the Pittsburgh Pirates and Los Angeles Angels of Anaheim in Major League Baseball (MLB).

== Professional career ==
=== Pittsburgh Pirates ===
Herrera made his U.S. pitching debut after defecting from Cuba in July 2005 and signing a Major League contract with the Pirates on December 18, 2006. He was rated by Baseball America as the Pirates' fourth best prospect entering the 2007 season. He was a member of the Pirates' 40-man roster during the '07 season though he spent the entire season with the Double-A Altoona Curve. He went 6–9 with a 4.69 ERA in 25 starts. In 128 2/3 innings pitched for the Curve, allowing 151 hits and 38 walks, while striking out 70 batters. Eastern League hitters posted a .296 average against him, including a .315 mark by left-handed batters.

In 2008 Herrera attended Major League spring training as a member of the Pirates' 40-man roster for the second consecutive season. He made 22 starts for Double-A Altoona, one with the Triple-A Indianapolis Indians and five in the Major Leagues with Pittsburgh. He was a member of the Curve's Opening Day roster for the second consecutive season. In 22 starts with Altoona he went 6–9 with a 3.46 ERA in a team-high 114 1/3 innings. Herrera was named Eastern League Pitcher of the Week for the week ending June 8 after his eight scoreless inning performance on June 6. He was promoted to Indianapolis for a spot start on June 27 against the Columbus Clippers and earned the win in his Triple-A debut, scattering seven hits and allowing only two runs. He returned to Altoona on June 29 Herrera was recalled by Pittsburgh on July 12 and made his Major League debut that night. He pitched 4 1/3 innings, giving up six earned runs, and stuck out four. He earned his first major league win on July 24, shutting out the San Diego Padres through six innings. Hererra was optioned back to the Double-A Curve on August 4.

Herrera split the 2009 season between the Double-A Curve and the Triple-A Indians. With the Curve he went 11–1 with a 3.23 ERA with 65 strikeouts, giving up five home runs in 97 2/3 innings pitched in 23 games, 15 starts. In four games with the Indians Herrera went 1–1 with a 2.30 ERA in 15 2/3 innings pitched. In November 2009, the Pirates released Herrera.

=== Minnesota Twins ===
Herrera's first pitch in the Major Leagues, to Aaron Miles of the St. Louis Cardinals

On March 2, 2010, Herrera signed a minor league deal with the Minnesota Twins. In May 2010, Herrera asked for and received his release.

=== Los Angeles Angels of Anaheim ===
Herrera signed a minor league deal with the Los Angeles Angels of Anaheim in December 2013.

== See also ==
- List of baseball players who defected from Cuba
