= T. J. Beam =

American baseball player and coach (born 1980)

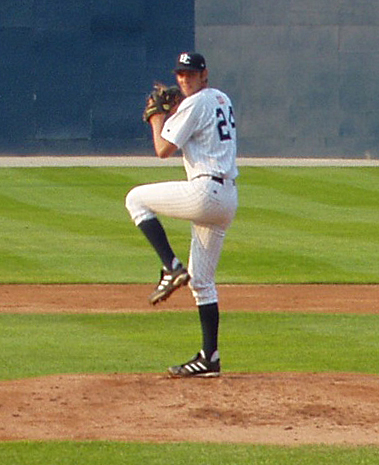
- Beam with the Battle Creek Yankees in 2003

Ole Miss Rebels
- Relief pitcher/Pitching coach
- Born: August 28, 1980 (age 45); Scottsdale, Arizona, U.S.
- Batted: Right Threw: Right

MLB debut
- June 17, 2006, for the New York Yankees

Last MLB appearance
- September 28, 2008, for the Pittsburgh Pirates

MLB statistics
- Win–loss record: 4–2
- Earned run average: 5.37
- Strikeouts: 36
- Stats at Baseball Reference

Teams
- New York Yankees (2006); Pittsburgh Pirates (2008)

Theodore Lester "T. J." Beam (born August 28, 1980) is a former Major League Baseball relief pitcher and current pitching coach for the Ole Miss Rebels baseball team.

== Professional career ==
=== New York Yankees ===
Beam made his major league debut for the New York Yankees on June 17, 2006, against the Washington Nationals at RFK Stadium in the bottom of the sixth inning. Beam pitched 1 and 1/3 of an inning giving up one home run, three hits, and one earned run. Beam's first career at bat resulted in a check swing strikeout by former Yankee relief pitcher Mike Stanton.

Beam won his first game on June 20, 2006, by pitching one-third of an inning, retiring the only batter he faced (Aaron Rowand), against the Philadelphia Phillies.

Beam was offered a new contract by the Yankees, declined, and became a free agent on December 12, 2007.

=== Pittsburgh Pirates ===
On December 14, 2007, Beam signed a minor league contract with the Pittsburgh Pirates. Through September 4, Beam had a 3.89 ERA in 22 games. On August 19, 2008, Beam retired the final batter of the game to notch his only career save, nailing down a 4-1 Pirates victory over the Cardinals.

=== Toronto Blue Jays ===
On January 30, 2009, Beam was designated for assignment to create roster space for newly signed outfielder Eric Hinske. On February 5, he was claimed off waivers by the Toronto Blue Jays.

=== Arizona Diamondbacks ===
On December 4, 2009, Beam signed a minor league contract which included an invitation to spring training by the Arizona Diamondbacks. He spent the season with Triple-A Reno, where he went 3–3 with a 6.33 ERA in 43 appearances with 5 saves, striking out 34 over 54 innings. He elected free agency following the season on November 6.

=== Lancaster Barnstormers ===
Beam spent 2011 with the Lancaster Barnstormers of the Atlantic League. In 52 appearances, Beam went 3–3 with a 4.78 ERA with 1 save, striking out 40 in 49 innings. He became a free agent following the season.

== Coaching career ==
Beam spent the 2013 season as the Ole Miss Rebels student assistant acting as a pitching coach. The Rebels pitching staff had a combined 3.07 ERA while striking out 432 over 557.2 innings.
