= Salomón Torres =

Dominican baseball player (born 1972)

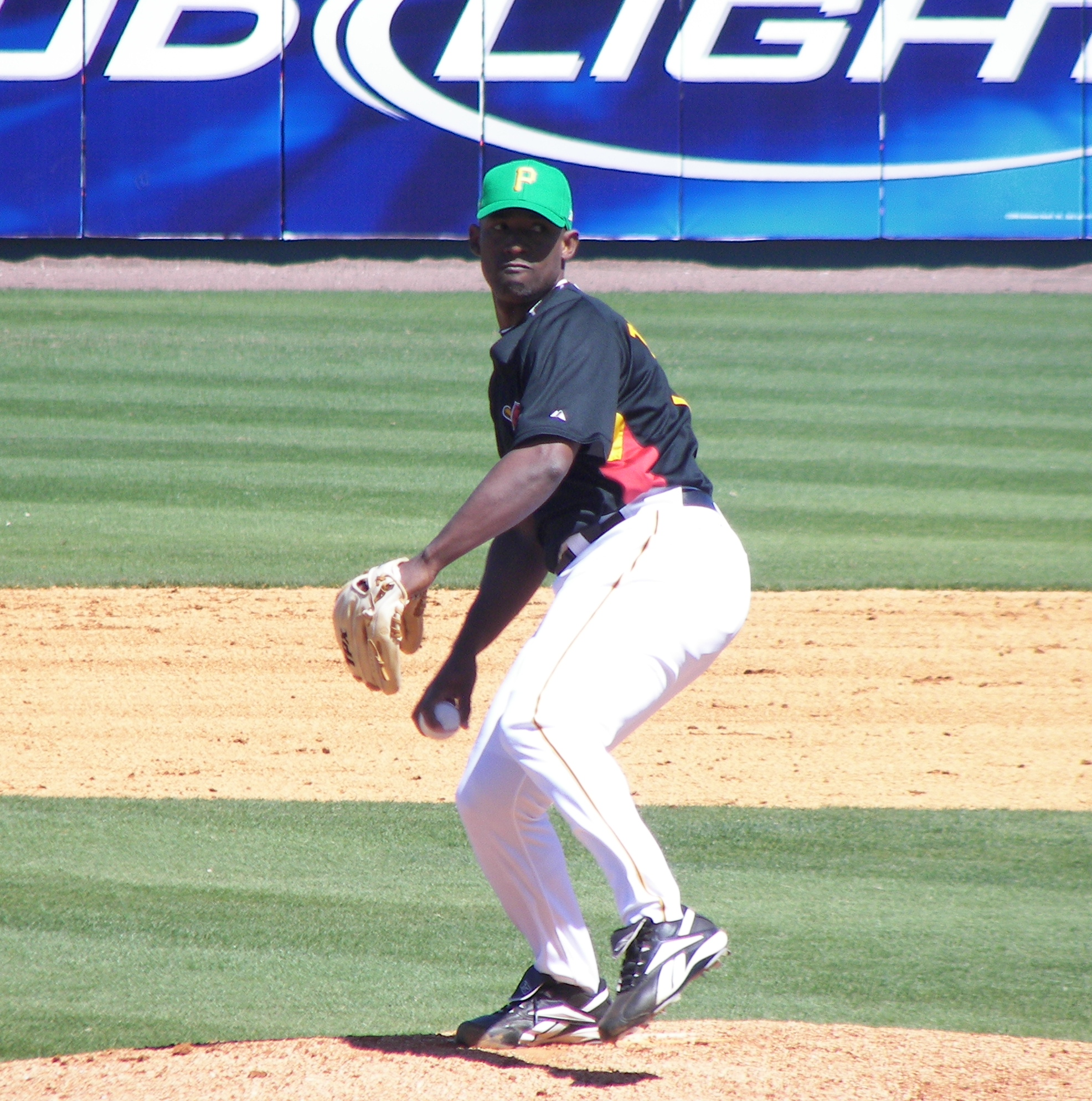
- Torres throwing a pitch for the Pirates
- Pitcher
- Born: March 11, 1972 (age 54); San Pedro de Macorís, Dominican Republic
- Batted: Right Threw: Right

Professional debut
- MLB: August 29, 1993, for the San Francisco Giants
- KBO: 2001, for the Samsung Lions

Last appearance
- MLB: September 27, 2008, for the Milwaukee Brewers
- KBO: 2001, for the Samsung Lions

MLB statistics
- Win–loss record: 44–58
- Earned run average: 4.31
- Strikeouts: 540

KBO statistics
- Win–loss record: 0–2
- Earned run average: 20.25
- Strikeouts: 5
- Stats at Baseball Reference

Teams
- As player: San Francisco Giants (1993–1995); Seattle Mariners (1995–1997); Montreal Expos (1997); Samsung Lions (2001); Pittsburgh Pirates (2002–2007); Milwaukee Brewers (2008); As coach: Tri-State Coal Cats (2024–present)

Salomón Torres Ramirez (born March 11, 1972) is a Dominican former professional baseball player. He began his career in 1993 with the San Francisco Giants, and also played for the Seattle Mariners, Montreal Expos, Pittsburgh Pirates, and Milwaukee Brewers.

== Career ==
=== San Francisco Giants ===
Torres is best known for starting the last game of the 1993 season for the Giants, when he gave up three runs over 3 1/3 innings to the arch-rival Los Angeles Dodgers. The Giants, winners of 103 games that season, finished in second place behind the 104-win Atlanta Braves, at that time in the National League West division. Though he was then in his first month as a Major Leaguer, some Giants fans blamed Torres for ruining a promising season and apparently never forgave him; those fans continued to heckle him when he returned to San Francisco as an opposing player. Said Torres: "They come to the park and they pay my salary, so they have the right to heckle me. If that's going to make them feel better and get over what happened in 1993, OK. But it's time to move on.... I don't think I was treated fairly by some of my teammates. And I still don't think I'm being treated fairly by the fans."

=== Mariners and Expos and first retirement ===
The Giants traded Torres to the Seattle Mariners in mid-1995 for Shawn Estes and Wilson Delgado. After two years with the Mariners, he was claimed off waivers by the Montreal Expos in mid-1997. After ending the 1997 season with a 9.82 ERA, Torres retired and returned to the Dominican Republic to coach for the Expos' Dominican Summer League team.

=== Comeback with Pirates ===
In 2001, Torres decided to make a comeback, and spent the year playing in the Dominican Winter League and in South Korea. He signed with the Pittsburgh Pirates in January 2002, spending most of the year with the Triple-A team in Nashville before being called up in September. He split the 2003 season between starting and relief work before being moved to the bullpen full-time in 2004. On April 20, 2003, Torres hit Chicago Cubs right fielder Sammy Sosa in the head with an errant fastball that shattered his helmet.

He served as the Pirates setup reliever in 2006, before closer Mike González was injured. That year, his 94 pitching appearances led the major leagues and tied the Pirates record held by Kent Tekulve. González was traded to the Atlanta Braves before the start of the 2007 season, making Torres the Pirates' top choice for closer entering the 2007 season. After blowing four saves for the Pirates, he was demoted from the closer role and replaced with Matt Capps.

=== Milwaukee Brewers ===
Torres was traded to the Milwaukee Brewers on December 7, 2007, for Kevin Roberts and Marino Salas. After beginning the 2008 season as a middle reliever, Torres was moved into the closer's role when Éric Gagné was put on the disabled list, a role Torres kept for the rest of the year. Torres struggled mightily towards the end of the season, however. On September 18, Torres blew a 4-run lead to the Chicago Cubs, giving up 4 runs with two outs and nobody on in the bottom of the 9th. He posted an ERA over 8.00 in the month of September.

His season, though, was relatively solid: 28 saves in 35 chances, 51 strikeouts in 80 innings of work, an ERA of 3.41, and a record of 7–5. During his time in Milwaukee, he introduced a new strike-out pitch in which he dropped down to a side-arm delivery.

During the middle of the 2008 season, Torres stated in an interview that he wasn't sure about his future in baseball, and on November 11 Torres told Brewers GM Doug Melvin that he was retiring from the game.

=== Tri-State Coal Cats ===
In February 2024, it was announced that Torres would take on the role of pitching coach for the newly established Tri-State Coal Cats in Huntington, West Virginia, part of the Appalachian League.

== Personal life ==
Torres is a Jehovah's Witness. He is married to Belkis Denia Donato and has three children.
