= Jeff Andrews =

American baseball player

Jeffrey J. Andrews (born January 27, 1959) is an American former professional baseball player and current coach. He was the pitching coach for the Pittsburgh Pirates in 2008, having been fired after one season at the position. Andrews spent each of the last 22 years as a minor league pitching coach/coordinator, the last five in the Pittsburgh organization. On May 20, 2009, he was hired by the Frisco RoughRiders (AA), replacing Joe Slusarski, marking his return to the Texas Rangers organization.

== Early life ==
Andrews is a 1977 graduate of Rapid City, South Dakota Stevens High School, where he played football and basketball. He played American Legion baseball since his high school team did not have a baseball program. He was also a pitcher on the Ohio Valley Conference Championship team as a freshman at East Tennessee State University in 1978. he led that squad to a Southern Conference title and into NCAA Regional playoffs as a junior in 1980.

== Playing career ==
A right-handed pitcher during his playing days, Andrews was originally selected by the Chicago Cubs in the 26th round of the 1981 draft. He pitched two years in the Cubs farm system, compiling a 10–6 record with Geneva (1981) and Salinas (1982).

== Coaching career ==
Andrews began his professional coaching career as a minor league instructor in the Texas Rangers organization in 1986. A year later he was pitching coach with Port Charlotte (A), a club that featured right-hander Kevin Brown and lefty Kenny Rogers. He also spent the next four years in the Texas farm system as pitching coach with the AA Tulsa Drillers (1988–90) and the Triple-A Oklahoma RedHawks (1991).

Jeff spent six years in the Seattle Mariners organization as Pitching Coach with the AA Jacksonville Suns (1992–94) and the AAA Tacoma Rainiers (1995–97). In that time, he worked with future major leaguers such as Derek Lowe and Mike Hampton. Following his tenure in the Mariners minor league system, Andrews spent two seasons as the minor league pitching coordinator for the San Diego Padres.

Prior to joining the Pirates, Andrews spent the 2002 season as Pitching Coach with the Lincoln Saltdogs of the independent Northern League. He also spent two seasons in the Florida Marlins organization as Pitching Coach with the AA Portland Sea Dogs in 2001 and in the same capacity with the Kane County Cougars in 2000.

His first position with the Pirates was as the pitching coach with Double-A Altoona for three seasons (2003–05). His 2003 pitching staff at Altoona established a franchise record by posting a 3.32 ERA and lefty Sean Burnett was named Eastern League Pitcher-of-the-Year under his watch during the same season. Jeff also served as a coach at the Major League Baseball Futures Game in Chicago during the All-Star festivities in 2003.

He next served as pitching coach with the Triple-A Indianapolis Indians in 2006–07. The 2006 pitching staff at Indy ranked fourth in ERA in the 14-team International League. Among the 23 pitchers on the 40-man roster heading into spring training this season, Jeff had worked with 13 of them with either Altoona or Indy.

== Notes ==
Preceded by Jim Colborn	Pittsburgh Pirates pitching coach 2008	Succeeded by Joe Kerrigan
