= 2009 Pittsburgh Pirates season =

2009 Pittsburgh Pirates
- League: National League
- Division: Central
- Ballpark: PNC Park
- City: Pittsburgh, Pennsylvania
- Record: 62–99 (.385)
- Divisional place: 6th
- Owners: Bob Nutting
- General managers: Neal Huntington
- Managers: John Russell
- Television: FSN Pittsburgh
- Radio: WPGB-FM (Steve Blass, Greg Brown, Tim Neverett, Bob Walk, John Wehner)

The 2009 Pittsburgh Pirates season was the 128th season of the franchise and the 123rd in the National League. This was their ninth season at PNC Park. The season is the franchise's second season under the management of John Russell. With this season, the Pirates became the first franchise in professional sports to have a losing record in 17 consecutive seasons, passing the Philadelphia Phillies of 1933–1948 with 16. The Pirates finished sixth and last in the National League Central with a record of 62–99. The Pirates were attempting to improve on their 2008 record, and conquer a winning record and make it to the playoffs for the first time since 1992. However, after going 11–10 in April, the Pirates suffered losing streaks. After an 8-game losing streak on May 3–10, the Pirates never reached above the .500 mark again, and failed to reach their goal.

== Off-season ==
The organization fired pitching coach Jeff Andrews and first-base coach Lou Frazier the day after the 2008 season concluded, but are expected to retain the rest of the staff through 2009. In October 2008, Joe Kerrigan—previously of the Boston Red Sox and Philadelphia Phillies—was hired as the new pitching coach, while Perry Hill became the first base coach. On November 24, the Pirates signed Dinesh Patel and Rinku Singh of India. The pair participated in the Million Dollar Arm, a contest held in their home country to discover who out of the 30,000 contestants had the strongest, most accurate arm. Having never heard of baseball prior to 2007, both Patel and Singh can throw over 90 mph. The pair will participate at spring training. Management plans to keep closer observations of players' off-season workouts.

Pirates' radio announcer of 33 years, Lanny Frattare, retired prior to the season. Tim Neverett, formerly of Fox Sports Rocky Mountain, was selected to replace him after a search of approximately 200 candidates. In January 2009, the team held its sixth PirateFest at the David L. Lawrence Convention Center. The three-day event was attended by 15,127 people, and increased the number of season ticket packages purchased from the 2008 season. President Frank Coonelly stated that the team had fallen behind the Pittsburgh Steelers and Pittsburgh Penguins from a "marketing and business perspective", but are "...working hard to get ourselves back up to where we belong both in Major League Baseball and Pittsburgh." The Pirates added sleeves to their uniform, and added an alternate uniform with a gold-colored P on the chest which will be worn during select games.

== Spring training ==
"It's time for us as an organization and our players to realize that losing is not acceptable. It's not an acceptable way of life for a Pirate."

— John Russell

The Pirates pre-season schedule consisted of 35 games in Bradenton, Florida, including two evening games and a game against the Netherlands national baseball team. When pitchers and catchers reported on February 13, three of twelve pitching positions were set: starter Paul Maholm, set-up man John Grabow, and closer Matt Capps. The Pirates entered spring training with 21 of 40 different players from 2008 spring training; among those were Eric Hinske, Ramón Vázquez, and Jason Jaramillo who were acquired during the off-season. Beginning March 5, Ian Snell, Ramón Vázquez, and John Grabow represented their countries in the 2009 World Baseball Classic. The Pirates finished spring training with a 17–15 record. "It gives us some confidence", said John Russell, "We worked hard all spring." The Pirates opening day salary was US$50,984,000. The Pirates finalized their opening day roster two days prior to the season opener (asterisk noting new players for the 2009 season):

Infielders

- Luis Cruz
- Adam LaRoche
- Andy LaRoche
- Freddy Sanchez
- Ramón Vázquez*
- Jack Wilson

Outfielders

- Eric Hinske*
- Nate McLouth
- Craig Monroe*
- Nyjer Morgan
- Brandon Moss

Catchers

- Ryan Doumit
- Jason Jaramillo*

Starting pitchers

- Zach Duke
- Jeff Karstens
- Paul Maholm
- Ross Ohlendorf
- Ian Snell

Relief pitchers

- Sean Burnett
- Matt Capps
- Jesse Chavez
- John Grabow
- Craig Hansen
- Donnie Veal*
- Tyler Yates

== Regular season ==
=== April ===
The Pirates opened the season with a 6–4 win over the St. Louis Cardinals, scoring four runs in the final inning to win their third consecutive come-from-behind opening day game. The Pirates had 17 hits two games later to beat the Cardinals 7–4, but were held to one hit the next day and split their opening series two games to two. Rain shortened the Pirates' series in Cincinnati to two games; Pittsburgh won the first game 10–2 after Ryan Doumit hit his first career grand slam in the final inning. On April 13, the Pirates completed the league's first triple play of the season and the Pirates' first in 16 years; however, they lost the game 2–0. In the team's home opener on April 13, Zach Duke pitched a complete game shutout, as the Pirates defeated the Houston Astros, 7–0. In the game, both the Pirates and the Astros wore Pittsburgh Police hats in honor of three officers who were shot and killed on April 4. The pre-game ceremonies honored the officers, as well as former Pirates pitcher and current broadcaster Steve Blass for this 50th season with the team, and included a flyover by four Apache helicopters from the 1/104th Attack Reconnaissance Battalion of the Pennsylvania Army National Guard. In the first Saturday afternoon game in Pittsburgh since 2005, Craig Monroe hit two three-run home runs in consecutive innings to give the Pirates their first back-to-back victories of the season. On April 21, catcher Ryan Doumit announced that surgery was needed to fix a broken bone in his wrist, and that he would miss eight to ten weeks. Later in the day, the Pirates beat the Florida Marlins 3–2, taking them two games above .500 since the first series of the 2007 season. The following day the Pirates swept the Marlins for the first time since 2005, giving Pittsburgh their best start through 15 games since 2002. The Pirates took two games out of three against the San Diego Padres, before closing April by getting swept by the Milwaukee Brewers. Andy LaRoche hit safely in a career high 11 games during the later part of the month.

Pittsburgh finished the month with an 11–10 record—the first time since 2002 that the team was over .500 at April's end. The team was tied for third place in the NL Central division, four games behind the St. Louis Cardinals, who finished the month with the league's best record. The pitching staff posted a league-low 3.41 earned run average (ERA), due in part to first-year pitching coach Joe Kerrigan teaching pitchers to base pitches on hitters' tendencies.

=== May ===
The Cincinnati Reds defeated the Pirates in two games out of three at PNC Park to open May. The concluding two games of the homestand saw the Pirates lose their 16 and 17th consecutive games to the Milwaukee Brewers—the second longest streak of any team over another in MLB history. The Pirates were swept during a two-game series in St. Louis—the losses extended Pittsburgh's losing streak to five consecutive road games and nine out of their past ten overall. The Pirates were swept by the New York Mets in their first series at New York's Citi Field, extending their losing streak to eight consecutive games. The Pirates returned home to defeat the St. Louis Cardinals in two out of three games. On May 13, Adam LaRoche became the first player in MLB history to have a home run taken away due to instant replay, during a procedure put into effect in August 2008. The Pirates concluded their homestand by taking two games out of three against the Colorado Rockies—finishing their homestand with a 4–2 record. In the final game of the Rockies's series Pittsburgh scored ten runs in one inning for the first time since August 2003. The Pirates won three out of four games against the Washington Nationals, extending their winning streak to five games. The Pirates continued their road trip with six games in Chicago—becoming the first team in MLB history to play the Cubs and White Sox in back-to-back series since interleague play began in 1997. After losing their first two games of the first interleague series of the season against the White Sox, Jack Wilson hit his first home run of the year to tie the final game of the series with two outs in the final inning; Nyjer Morgan scored the winning run later in the inning. On May 25, Freddy Sanchez became the first Pirate to acquire six hits in one game since Wally Backman in 1990, as the Pirates defeated the Cubs. The Pirates lost two out of three games against the Cubs, scoring a total of three runs in their losses. The Pirates concluded the month by losing two games out of three to the Houston Astros. Nate McLouth hit a home run to lead off the final game of the month, but the Pirates score any other runs, losing 2–1. Throughout May the Pirates accumulated an 11–17 record, finishing 20–28 overall for the season. The team was in fifth place in the National League Central division.

=== June ===
The Pirates began the month with a four-game series against the New York Mets, although it was shortened to three games when the June 3 game was postponed. The Pirates won all three games that were played. On June 4, the Pirates traded All Star Nate McLouth to the Atlanta Braves for three minor league players, including future starting pitcher Charlie Morton. Later in the day, the team promoted outfielder Andrew McCutchen from AAA Indianapolis, who became the team's regular starting center fielder. The Pirates then dropped two of three to the Astros in Houston, and two of four to the Atlanta Braves before returning home for the start of Interleague play. They took two games from the Tigers before going on another road series, first to Minnesota (where they only won one game), and then to Colorado (where they were swept). They then came back home to win two of three against both the Cleveland Indians and the Kansas City Royals. In the game against the Royals on June 26, starting pitcher Virgil Vasquez earned his first win in his major league debut. The Pirates then played a three-game series against Chicago which stretched into July, which they lost two games to three. On June 30, starting center fielder Nyjer Morgan and relief pitcher Sean Burnett were traded to the Washington Nationals in exchange for Lastings Milledge and Joel Hanrahan. Hanrahan was put on the starting roster immediately, but Milledge was forced to go through a series of rehab-starts in AAA Indianapolis before being called up, due to an existing injury. During this month, the city's National Hockey League team, the Penguins, won the Stanley Cup, which coupled with the team's struggles and the National Football League's Steelers winning the Super Bowl back in February, led to a running joke that dubbed the city to be the "City of Champions. And the Pirates".

=== July ===
The Pirates lost the first game of the month against the Cubs, then played the Mets in the make-up of the postponed June 3 game. They lost 9–8 in 10 innings, despite having tied up the game off of All-Star closer Francisco Rodríguez. The Pirates then went to Florida to face the Marlins, and lost two games to three. They fared no better on their trip to Houston, where they also won only one game, and then they were swept by the Phillies in their next series. On July 17, in the first of a three-game series against the San Francisco Giants, reliever Evan Meek picked up his first win of the season in a 14-inning game. They also won the next game, though they would lose the series finale. On July 20, in the first of a three-game series against the Brewers, the benches were cleared in the eighth inning when Milwaukee pitcher Chris Smith hit Pittsburgh reliever Jeff Karstens with a pitch. The Pirates won that game 8–5, and the series 2–1. Their next road trip took them to Atlanta, where they dropped three of five, and then to San Francisco, where they were swept. Before the final game of the series on July 29, the Pirates traded veteran shortstop Jack Wilson to the Seattle Mariners in exchange for future starting shortstop Ronny Cedeño and four Minor League players. After the game, the Pirates traded three-time All-Star second baseman Freddy Sanchez to the Giants for minor league pitcher Tim Alderson. On July 31, the Pirates returned home for a four-game series against the Nationals which stretched into August.

=== August ===
Though they won the games on both July 31 and August 1, the Pirates lost the next two games to split the series 2–2. This started an eight-game losing streak, against the Nationals, the Diamondbacks, and the Cardinals, which ended August 11 when the Pirates defeated the Rockies in Colorado. They lost the next two against the Rockies, and the next two against the Cubs. The August 16 game in Chicago was postponed because of rain. Returning home, the Pirates swept the Brewers and took two of three from the Reds and Phillies. The Pirates didn't win a game the rest of the month, being swept by the Brewers and the Reds in a series stretching into September.

=== September ===
The Pirates opened the month of September losing both games in a doubleheader against the Reds. They then returned home to play the Cardinals, against whom they won one game out of three. They then lost the first game of a three-game series against the Cubs, giving them their 82nd loss, and setting the record for most consecutive losing seasons in any sport since the 1933–1948 Philadelphia Phillies.

=== Game log ===
2009 Game Log (62–99)
April (11–10)

#	Date	Opponent	Score	Win	Loss	Save	Attendance	Record
1	April 6	@ Cardinals	6–4	**Grabow** (1–0)	Motte	**Capps** (1)	45,832	1–0
2	April 7	@ Cardinals	3–9	Lohse	**Snell** (0–1)	—	35,206	1–1
3	April 8	@ Cardinals	7–4	**Duke** (1–0)	Wellemeyer	**Capps** (2)	35,535	2–1
4	April 9	@ Cardinals	1–2	Carpenter	**Ohlendorf** (0–1)	Reyes	35,293	2–2
—	April 10	@ Reds	Postponed Rescheduled for August 31					
5	April 11	@ Reds	10–2	**Maholm** (1–0)	Cueto	—	22,276	3–2
6	April 12	@ Reds	0–2	Harang	**Snell** (0–2)	—	12,876	3–3
7	April 13	Astros	7–0	**Duke** (2–0)	Moehler	—	38,411	4–3
8	April 15	Astros	1–4	Hampton	**Ohlendorf** (0–2)	—	20,690	4–4
9	April 16	Astros	3–6	Wright	**Burnett** (0–1)	Hawkins	13,877	4–5
10	April 17	Braves	3–0	**Maholm** (2–0)	Jurrjens	**Capps** (3)	15,659	5–5
11	April 18	Braves	10–0	**Snell** (1–2)	Reyes	—	20,755	6–5
12	April 19	Braves	1–11	Vazquez	**Duke** (2–1)	—	14,776	6–6
13	April 20	Marlins	8–0	**Ohlendorf** (1–2)	Miller	—	8,790	7–6
14	April 21	Marlins	3–2	**Karstens** (1–0)	Sanchez	**Capps** (4)	9,917	8–6
15	April 22	Marlins	7–4	**Maholm** (3–0)	Nolasco	**Capps** (5)	10,655	9–6
16	April 24	@ Padres	3–4 (11)	Moreno	**Capps** (0–1)	—	25,601	9–7
17	April 25	@ Padres	10–1	**Duke** (3–1)	Hill	—	41,665	10–7
18	April 26	@ Padres	8–3	**Ohlendorf** (2–2)	Peavy	—	30,848	11–7
19	April 27	@ Brewers	5–10	Coffey	**Yates** (0–1)	—	32,198	11–8
20	April 28	@ Brewers	5–6	Julio	**Chavez** (0–1)	Hoffman	26,594	11–9
21	April 29	@ Brewers	0–1	Gallardo	**Snell** (1–3)	Villanueva	29,791	11–10

May (11–18)

#	Date	Opponent	Score	Win	Loss	Save	Attendance	Record
22	May 1	Reds	0–4	Arroyo	**Duke** (3–2)	—	14,238	11–11
23	May 2	Reds	8–6	**Ohlendorf** (3–2)	Owings	—	22,891	12–11
24	May 3	Reds	0–5	Cueto	**Karstens** (1–1)	—	13,670	12–12
25	May 4	Brewers	4–7	DiFelice	**Capps** (0–2)	Hoffman	8,482	12–13
26	May 5	Brewers	5–8	Suppan	**Snell** (1–4)	Villanueva	9,775	12–14
27	May 6	@ Cardinals	2–4	McClellan	**Duke** (3–3)	Franklin	36,188	12–15
28	May 7	@ Cardinals	2–5	Wellemeyer	**Ohlendorf** (3–3)	Franklin	41,928	12–16
29	May 8	@ Mets	3–7	Parnell	**Yates** (0–2)	—	38,496	12–17
30	May 9	@ Mets	1–10	Maine	**Maholm** (3–1)	—	39,769	12–18
31	May 10	@ Mets	4–8	Hernandez	**Snell** (1–5)	—	39,871	12–19
32	May 12	Cardinals	7–1	**Duke** (4–3)	Wellemeyer	—	11,718	13–19
33	May 13	Cardinals	5–2	**Ohlendorf** (4–3)	Piñeiro	**Capps** (6)	10,494	14–19
34	May 14	Cardinals	1–5	Miller	**Karstens** (1–2)	—	12,347	14–20
35	May 15	Rockies	1–3	Embree	**Capps** (0–3)	Street	17,179	14–21
36	May 16	Rockies	7–4	**Burnett** (1–1)	Belisle	**Capps** (7)	24,496	15–21
37	May 17	Rockies	11–4	**Duke** (5–3)	Embree	—	14,545	16–21
38	May 18	@ Nationals	12–7	**Ohlendorf** (5–3)	Mock	—	14,549	17–21
39	May 19	@ Nationals	8–5 (10)	**Gorzelanny** (1–0)	Beimel	—	18,579	18–21
40	May 20	@ Nationals	2–1	**Grabow** (2–0)	Hanrahan	**Capps** (8)	17,854	19–21
41	May 21	@ Nationals	4–5	Tavarez	**Gorzelanny** (1–1)	Hanrahan	17,816	19–22
42	May 22	@ White Sox	0–2	Floyd	**Duke** (5–4)	Jenks	23,347	19–23
43	May 23	@ White Sox	0–4	Richard	**Ohlendorf** (5–4)	—	32,389	19–24
44	May 24	@ White Sox	4–3	**Grabow** (3–0)	Jenks	**Capps** (9)	28,309	20–24
45	May 25	@ Cubs	10–8	**Gorzelanny** (2–1)	Cotts	**Burnett** (1)	38,942	21–24
46	May 26	@ Cubs	1–6 (5)	Marshall	**Snell** (1–6)	—	38,303	21–25
47	May 27	@ Cubs	2–5	Marmol	**Chavez** (0–2)	Gregg	38,314	21–26
48	May 29	Astros	1–6	Moehler	**Ohlendorf** (5–5)	—	18,236	21–27
49	May 30	Astros	7–4	**Karstens** (2–2)	Rodriguez	**Capps** (10)	37,167	22–27
50	May 31	Astros	1–2	Hampton	**Maholm** (3–2)	Hawkins	19,566	22–28

June (14–13)

#	Date	Opponent	Score	Win	Loss	Save	Attendance	Record
51	June 1	Mets	8–5	**Gorzelanny** (3–1)	Putz	**Capps** (11)	11,812	23–28
52	June 2	Mets	3–1	**Duke** (6–4)	Santana	**Capps** (12)	10,459	24–28
—	June 3	@ Mets	Postponed Rescheduled for July 2					
53	June 4	Mets	11–6	**Jackson** (1–0)	Pelfrey	—	20,683	25–28
54	June 5	@ Astros	1–9	Hampton	**Karstens** (2–3)	—	26,222	25–29
55	June 6	@ Astros	6–4	**Maholm** (4–2)	Oswalt	**Capps** (13)	26,099	26–29
56	June 7	@ Astros	4–6	Fulchino	**Jackson** (1–1)	Hawkins	25,729	26–30
57	June 8	@ Braves	6–7 (15)	Medlen	**Karstens** (2–4)	—	21,856	26–31
58	June 9	@ Braves	3–4	Lowe	**Burnett** (1–2)	Soriano	20,124	26–32
59	June 10	@ Braves	3–2	**Karstens** (3–4)	Jurrjens	**Capps** (14)	21,610	27–32
60	June 11	@ Braves	3–1	**Jackson** (2–1)	Soriano	**Capps** (15)	29,331	28–32
61	June 12	Tigers	1–3	Porcello	**Snell** (1–7)	Rodney	18,369	28–33
62	June 13	Tigers	9–3	**Duke** (7–4)	Galarraga	—	31,411	29–33
63	June 14	Tigers	6–3	**Ohlendorf** (6–5)	Willis	**Capps** (16)	27,565	30–33
64	June 16	@ Twins	2–8	Perkins	**Maholm** (4–3)	—	25,351	30–34
65	June 17	@ Twins	8–2	**Snell** (2–7)	Liriano	—	30,057	31–34
66	June 18	@ Twins	1–5	Blackburn	**Duke** (7–5)	—	30,670	31–35
67	June 19	@ Rockies	3–7	Marquis	**Ohlendorf** (6–6)	—	31,248	31–36
68	June 20	@ Rockies	7–9	Street	**Chavez** (0–3)	—	32,137	31–37
69	June 21	@ Rockies	4–5	De La Rosa	**Maholm** (4–4)	Street	44,131	31–38
70	June 23	Indians	4–5	Huff	**Snell** (2–8)	Wood	19,109	31–39
71	June 24	Indians	10–6	**Duke** (8–5)	Pavano	—	20,162	32–39
72	June 25	Indians	3–2	**Capps** (1–3)	Herges	—	30,120	33–39
73	June 26	Royals	5–3	**Vasquez** (1–0)	Meche	**Capps** (17)	18,458	34–39
74	June 27	Royals	6–2	**Maholm** (5–4)	Chen	—	36,032	35–39
75	June 28	Royals	2–3	Greinke	**Morton** (0–1)	Soria	25,888	35–40
76	June 29	Cubs	1–3	Harden	**Duke** (8–6)	Gregg	15,400	35–41
77	June 30	Cubs	3–0	**Ohlendorf** (7–6)	Lilly	**Capps** (18)	17,054	36–41

July (8–17)

#	Date	Opponent	Score	Win	Loss	Save	Attendance	Record
78	July 1	Cubs	1–4	Wells	**Vasquez** (1–1)	Gregg	15,770	36–42
79	July 2	Mets	8–9 (10)	Rodriguez	**Capps** (1–4)	—	14,321	36–43
80	July 3	@ Marlins	7–4	**Morton** (1–1)	Volstad	—	16,114	37–43
81	July 4	@ Marlins	3–5	Miller	**Duke** (8–7)	Meyer	25,303	37–44
82	July 5	@ Marlins	0–5	Nolasco	**Ohlendorf** (7–7)	—	13,287	37–45
83	July 6	@ Astros	1–4	Hampton	**Vasquez** (1–2)	Valverde	26,834	37–46
84	July 7	@ Astros	6–3	**Maholm** (6–4)	Moehler	**Capps** (19)	27,142	38–46
85	July 8	@ Astros	0–5	Rodriguez	**Morton** (1–2)	—	29,243	38–47
86	July 10	@ Phillies	2–3	Blanton	**Duke** (8–8)	Lidge	45,246	38–48
87	July 11	@ Phillies	7–8	Walker	**Capps** (1–5)	—	45,209	38–49
88	July 12	@ Phillies	2–5	Happ	**Vasquez** (1–3)	—	45,245	38–50
89	July 17	Giants	2–1 (14)	**Meek** (1–0)	Howry	—	26,709	39–50
90	July 18	Giants	2–0	**Morton** (2–2)	Zito	**Capps** (20)	37,023	40–50
91	July 19	Giants	3–4	Cain	**Duke** (8–9)	Wilson	24,842	40–51
92	July 20	Brewers	8–5	**Ohlendorf** (8–7)	Burns	—	11,471	41–51
93	July 21	Brewers	0–2	Looper	**Vasquez** (1–4)	Hoffman	16,184	41–52
94	July 22	Brewers	8–7	**Capps** (2–5)	Stetter	—	21,186	42–52
95	July 23	@ Diamondbacks	4–11	Gutierrez	**Meek** (1–1)	—	24,008	42–53
96	July 24	@ Diamondbacks	10–3	**Duke** (9–9)	Petit	—	24,911	43–53
97	July 25	@ Diamondbacks	0–7	Davis	**Ohlendorf** (8–8)	—	26,037	43–54
98	July 26	@ Diamondbacks	0–9	Scherzer	**Vasquez** (1–5)	—	27,507	43–55
99	July 27	@ Giants	2–4	Lincecum	**Maholm** (6–5)	—	40,008	43–56
100	July 28	@ Giants	2–3	Romo	**Morton** (2–3)	Wilson	35,972	43–57
101	July 29	@ Giants	0–1 (10)	Wilson	**Capps** (2–6)	—	37,582	43–58
102	July 31	Nationals	5–4	**Ohlendorf** (9–8)	Lannan	**Capps** (21)	23,363	44–58

August (9–19)

#	Date	Opponent	Score	Win	Loss	Save	Attendance	Record
103	August 1	Nationals	11–6	**Vasquez** (2–5)	Stammen	—	26,855	45–58
104	August 2	Nationals	3–5	Burnett	**Maholm** (6–6)	MacDougal	21,894	45–59
105	August 3	Nationals	4–8	Clippard	**Morton** (2–4)	MacDougal	11,630	45–60
106	August 4	Diamondbacks	0–6	Petit	**Duke** (9–10)	—	11,294	45–61
107	August 5	Diamondbacks	3–4	Davis	**Hanrahan** (0–1)	Qualls	11,470	45–62
108	August 6	Diamondbacks	6–11 (12)	Rauch	**Jackson** (2–2)	—	17,311	45–63
109	August 7	Cardinals	4–6	Carpenter	**Ascanio** (0–1)	Franklin	24,854	45–64
110	August 8	Cardinals	3–5	Wainwright	**Morton** (2–5)	Franklin	38,593	45–65
111	August 9	Cardinals	3–7	Piñeiro	**Capps** (2–7)	McClellan	24,369	45–66
112	August 11	@ Rockies	7–3	**Ohlendorf** (10–8)	Chacin	—	35,212	46–66
113	August 12	@ Rockies	0–8	Jimenez	**Hart** (0–1)	—	29,430	46–67
114	August 13	@ Rockies	1–10	Marquis	**Maholm** (6–7)	—	27,619	46–68
115	August 14	@ Cubs	2–17	Wells	**Morton** (2–6)	—	41,619	46–69
116	August 15	@ Cubs	1–3	Gorzelanny	**Duke** (9–11)	Gregg	41,197	46–70
—	August 16	@ Cubs	Postponed Rescheduled for September 30					
117	August 17	Brewers	9–5	**Hart** (1–1)	Villanueva	—	12,478	47–70
118	August 18	Brewers	5–2	**Ohlendorf** (11–8)	Parra	—	12,188	48–70
119	August 19	Brewers	3–1	**Maholm** (7–7)	Gallardo	**Capps** (22)	12,630	49–70
120	August 21	Reds	5–2	**Morton** (3–6)	Owings	**Capps** (23)	22,725	50–70
121	August 22	Reds	12–2	**Duke** (10–11)	Lehr	—	32,570	51–70
122	August 23	Reds	1–4	Bailey	**Hart** (1–2)	Cordero	21,209	51–71
123	August 25	Phillies	6–4	**Capps** (3–7)	Lidge	—	17,049	52–71
124	August 26	Phillies	1–4 (10)	Madson	**Jackson** (2–3)	—	17,403	52–72
125	August 27	Phillies	3–2	**Bautista** (1–0)	Happ	**Capps** (24)	24,470	53–72
126	August 28	@ Brewers	6–8	Parra	**Duke** (10–12)	Hoffman	34,438	53–73
127	August 29	@ Brewers	3–7	Vargas	**Hart** (1–3)	—	41,773	53–74
128	August 30	@ Brewers	1–4	Suppan	**Ohlendorf** (11–9)	Hoffman	41,157	53–75
129	August 31	@ Reds	3–4	Masset	**Chavez** (0–4)	—	13,051	53–76
130	August 31	@ Reds	3–6	Cueto	**Maholm** (7–8)	Cordero	9,087	53–77

September (8–20)

#	Date	Opponent	Score	Win	Loss	Save	Attendance	Record
131	September 1	@ Reds	5–11	Lehr	**Morton** (3–7)	Owings	10,304	53–78
132	September 2	@ Reds	3–5	Bailey	**Duke** (10–13)	Cordero	11,541	53–79
133	September 4	Cardinals	7–14	Wainwright	**Hart** (1–4)	—	15,258	53–80
134	September 5	Cardinals	1–2 (10)	Hawksworth	**Capps** (3–8)	Franklin	27,071	53–81
135	September 6	Cardinals	6–5	**Chavez** (1–4)	Franklin	—	19,274	54–81
136	September 7	Cubs	2–4	Lilly	**McCutchen** (0–1)	Marmol	14,673	54–82
137	September 8	Cubs	4–9	Dempster	**Duke** (10–14)	—	17,862	54–83
138	September 9	Cubs	5–8	Zambrano	**Hart** (1–5)	Marmol	10,899	54–84
139	September 11	@ Astros	1–9	Norris	**Morton** (3–8)	—	31,302	54–85
140	September 12	@ Astros	2–4	Fulchino	**Ohlendorf** (11–10)	Valverde	35,213	54–86
141	September 13	@ Astros	2–1	**Maholm** (8–8)	Paulino	**Capps** (25)	34,405	55–86
142	September 14	@ Dodgers	2–6	Garland	**McCutchen** (0–2)	—	42,045	55–87
143	September 15	@ Dodgers	4–5 (13)	Belisario	**Dumatrait** (0–1)	—	52,562	55–88
144	September 16	@ Dodgers	1–3	Kuroda	**Hart** (1–6)	Broxton	53,193	55–89
145	September 18	Padres	5–1	**Morton** (4–8)	Stauffer	—	26,178	56–89
146	September 19	Padres	1–2	Gregerson	**Dumatrait** (0–2)	Bell	20,379	56–90
147	September 20	Padres	0–4	Correia	**Maholm** (8–9)	Bell	24,028	56–91
148	September 21	Padres	6–11 (11)	Gallagher	**Karstens** (3–5)	—	12,566	56–92
149	September 22	Reds	4–10	Cueto	**Duke** (10–15)	—	16,492	56–93
150	September 23	Reds	2–12	Bailey	**Hart** (1–7)	—	15,980	56–94
151	September 24	Reds	1–4	Arroyo	**Morton** (4–9)	Cordero	15,892	56–95
152	September 25	Dodgers	3–1	**Veal** (1–0)	Garland	**Capps** (26)	19,452	57–95
153	September 26	Dodgers	4–8	Sherrill	**Bautista** (1–1)	—	35,605	57–96
154	September 27	Dodgers	6–5	**Capps** (4–8)	Broxton	—	26,831	58–96
155	September 28	Dodgers	11–1	**Duke** (11–15)	Kuroda	—	16,696	59–96
156	September 29	@ Cubs	0–6	Dempster	**Hart** (1–8)	—	35,308	59–97
157	September 30	@ Cubs	4–0	**Morton** (5–9)	Lilly	—	34,362	60–97
158	September 30	@ Cubs	8–2	**Karstens** (4–5)	Zambrano	—	33,299	61–97

October (1–2)

#	Date	Opponent	Score	Win	Loss	Save	Attendance	Record
159	October 2	@ Reds	3–1	**McCutchen** (1–2)	Lehr	**Capps** (27)	16,288	62–97
160	October 3	@ Reds	4–8	Cueto	**Duke** (11–16)	—	24,539	62–98
161	October 4	@ Reds	0–6	Bailey	**Karstens** (4–6)	—	20,940	62–99

Legend: = Win = Loss = Postponement
Bold = Pirates team member

== Divisional standings ==
NL Central
Team	W	L	Pct.	GB	Home	Road
St. Louis Cardinals	91	71	.562	—	46‍–‍35	45‍–‍36
Chicago Cubs	83	78	.516	7½	46‍–‍34	37‍–‍44
Milwaukee Brewers	80	82	.494	11	40‍–‍41	40‍–‍41
Cincinnati Reds	78	84	.481	13	40‍–‍41	38‍–‍43
Houston Astros	74	88	.457	17	44‍–‍37	30‍–‍51
Pittsburgh Pirates	62	99	.385	28½	40‍–‍41	22‍–‍58

=== Record vs. opponents ===
2009 National League record Source: MLB Standings Grid – 2009
Team	AZ	ATL	CHC	CIN	COL	FLA	HOU	LAD	MIL	NYM	PHI	PIT	SD	SF	STL	WAS	AL
Arizona	–	3–4	4–2	1–5	7–11	5–3	5–4	7–11	2–5	5–2	1–5	6–1	11–7	5–13	2–4	1–5	5–10
Atlanta	4–3	–	4–2	3–6	4–4	8–10	3–3	4–3	3–3	13–5	10–8	3–4	3–3	3–4	4–2	10–8	7–8
Chicago	2–4	2–4	–	10–5	2–4	4–3	11–6	3–5	10–7	3–3	1–5	10–4	4–5	4–2	6–10	5–2	6–9
Cincinnati	5–1	6–3	5–10	–	0–7	3–3	12–4	1–5	8–7	2–4	2–5	13–5	1–6	3–3	8–8	3–4	6–9
Colorado	11–7	4–4	4–2	7–0	–	2–4	2–5	4–14	6–0	3–4	2–4	6–3	10–8	8–10	6–1	6–0	11–4
Florida	3–5	10–8	3–4	3–3	4–2	–	4–3	3–3	3–4	11–7	9–9	2–4	4–2	3–4	3–3	12–6	10–8
Houston	4–5	3–3	6–11	4–12	5–2	3–4	–	4–3	5–10	1–5	6–2	10–5	6–1	2–4	6–9	3–3	6–9
Los Angeles	11–7	3–4	5–3	5–1	14–4	3–3	3–4	–	3–3	5–1	4–3	4–3	10–8	11–7	2–5	3–2	9–9
Milwaukee	5–2	3–3	7–10	7–8	0–6	4–3	10–5	3–3	–	3–3	4–3	9–5	2–4	4–5	9–9	5–3	5–10
New York	2–5	5–13	3–3	4–2	4–3	7–11	5–1	1–5	3–3	–	6–12	4–3	2–5	5–3	4–5	10–8	5–10
Philadelphia	5–1	8–10	5–1	5–2	4–2	9–9	2–6	3–4	3–4	12–6	–	4–2	5–2	3–4	4–1	15–3	6–12
Pittsburgh	1–6	4–3	4–10	5–13	3–6	4–2	5–10	3–4	5–9	3–4	2–4	–	3–4	2–4	5–10	5–3	8–7
San Diego	7–11	3–3	5–4	6–1	8–10	2–4	1–6	8–10	4–2	5–2	2–5	4–3	–	10–8	1–6	4–2	5–10
San Francisco	13–5	4–3	2–4	3–3	10–8	4–3	4–2	7–11	5–4	3–5	4–3	4–2	8–10	–	4–3	4–2	9–6
St. Louis	4–2	2–4	10–6	8–8	1–6	3–3	9–6	5–2	9–9	5–4	1–4	10–5	6–1	3–4	–	6–1	9–6
Washington	5–1	8–10	2–5	4–3	0–6	6–12	3–3	2–3	3–5	8–10	3–15	3–5	2–4	2–4	1–6	–	7–11

=== Detailed records ===
National League
Opponent	W	L	WP	RS	RA
NL East
Atlanta Braves	4	3	0.571	29	25
Florida Marlins	4	2	0.667	28	20
New York Mets	3	4	0.429	38	46
Philadelphia Phillies	2	4	0.333	21	26
Washington Nationals	5	3	0.625	49	41
Total	18	16	0.529	165	158
NL Central
Chicago Cubs	4	10	0.286	44	75
Cincinnati Reds	5	13	0.278	64	94
Houston Astros	5	10	0.333	43	67
Milwaukee Brewers	5	9	0.357	62	73
St. Louis Cardinals	5	10	0.333	58	75
Total	24	52	0.316	271	384
NL West
Arizona Diamondbacks	1	6	0.143	23	51
Colorado Rockies	3	6	0.333	41	53
Los Angeles Dodgers	3	4	0.429	31	29
San Diego Padres	3	4	0.429	33	26
San Francisco Giants	2	4	0.333	11	13
Total	12	24	0.333	139	172
American League
Chicago White Sox	1	2	0.333	4	9
Cleveland Indians	2	1	0.667	17	13
Detroit Tigers	2	1	0.667	16	9
Kansas City Royals	2	1	0.667	13	8
Minnesota Twins	1	2	0.333	11	15
Total	8	7	0.533	61	54
Season Total	62	99	0.385	636	768

Month	Games	Won	Lost	Win %	RS	RA
April	21	11	10	0.524	101	75
May	29	11	18	0.379	113	141
June	27	14	13	0.519	123	114
July	25	8	17	0.320	83	116
August	28	9	19	0.321	109	154
September	28	8	20	0.286	100	153
October	3	1	2	0.333	7	15
Total	161	62	99	0.385	636	768

	Games	Won	Lost	Win %	RS	RA
Home	81	40	41	0.494	360	354
Away	80	22	58	0.275	276	414
Total	161	62	99	0.385	636	768

== Roster ==
2009 Pittsburgh Pirates
Roster
Pitchers: 45 José Ascanio; 54 Denny Bautista; 52 Chris Bootcheck; 17 Sean Burnett; 55 Matt Capps; 43 Jesse Chavez; 61 Anthony Claggett; 57 Zach Duke; 32 Phil Dumatrait; 24 Tom Gorzelanny; 34 John Grabow; 17 Eric Hacker; 52 Joel Hanrahan; 38 Craig Hansen; 25 Kevin Hart; 58 Steven Jackson; 27 Jeff Karstens; 28 Paul Maholm; 62 Daniel McCutchen; 47 Evan Meek; 37 Charlie Morton; 49 Ross Ohlendorf; 45 Ian Snell; 50 Virgil Vasquez; 56 Donald Veal; 30 Tyler Yates	Catchers: 23 Robinzon Díaz; 41 Ryan Doumit; 35 Jason Jaramillo; Infielders: 10 Brian Bixler; 13 Ronny Cedeño; 36 Luis Cruz; 25 Adam LaRoche; 15 Andy LaRoche; 51 Steven Pearce; 12 Freddy Sanchez; 5 Ramón Vázquez; 19 Neil Walker; 2 Jack Wilson; 48 Delwyn Young; Outfielders: 16 Eric Hinske; 46 Garrett Jones; 22 Andrew McCutchen; 13 Nate McLouth; 85 Lastings Milledge; 18 Craig Monroe; 3 Nyjer Morgan; 44 Brandon Moss; 18 Jeff Salazar	Manager: 7 John Russell; Coaches: 86 Heberto Andrade (bullpen catcher); 29 Tony Beasley (third base); 60 Luis Dorante (bullpen); 6 Perry Hill (first base); 39 Joe Kerrigan (pitching); 59 Don Long (hitting); 14 Gary Varsho (bench)

=== Opening Day lineup ===
Opening Day Starters
Name	Position
Nyjer Morgan	LF
Freddy Sanchez	2B
Nate McLouth	CF
Ryan Doumit	C
Adam LaRoche	1B
Andy LaRoche	3B
Brandon Moss	RF
Jack Wilson	SS
Paul Maholm	SP

== Awards and honors ==
2009 Major League Baseball All-Star Game

- Freddy Sanchez, 2B, reserve
- Zach Duke, P, reserve

== Statistics ==
Hitting

Note: G = Games played; AB = At bats; H = Hits; Avg. = Batting average; HR = Home runs; RBI = Runs batted in

Regular season
Player	G	AB	H	Avg.	HR	RBI
F. Sanchez	86	355	105	0.296	6	34
G. Jones	82	314	92	0.293	21	44
L. Milledge	58	220	64	0.291	4	20
A. McCutchen	108	433	124	0.286	12	54
R. Díaz	41	129	36	0.279	1	19
N. Morgan	71	278	77	0.277	2	27
J. Wilson	75	266	71	0.267	4	31
D. Young	124	354	94	0.266	7	43
R. Cedeño	46	155	40	0.258	5	21
An. LaRoche	150	524	135	0.258	12	64
N. McLouth	45	168	43	0.256	9	34
E. Hinske	54	106	27	0.255	1	11
J. Jaramillo	63	206	52	0.252	3	26
R. Doumit	75	280	70	0.250	10	38
Ad. LaRoche	87	324	80	0.247	12	40
B. Moss	133	385	91	0.236	7	41
R. Vázquez	101	204	47	0.230	1	16
B. Bixler	18	44	10	0.227	0	3
C. Monroe	34	79	17	0.215	3	16
L. Cruz	27	70	15	0.214	0	2
S. Pearce	60	165	34	0.206	4	16
Z. Duke	31	60	12	0.200	0	5
N. Walker	17	36	7	0.194	0	0
I. Snell	15	23	4	0.174	0	1
C. Morton	18	31	4	0.129	0	1
K. Hart	10	16	2	0.125	0	1
D. McCutchen	6	11	1	0.091	0	1
P. Maholm	30	58	4	0.069	1	2
R. Ohlendorf	28	59	4	0.068	0	0
J. Karstens	37	22	1	0.045	0	0
J. Salazar	21	23	1	0.043	0	1
C. Bootcheck	13	2	0	0.000	0	0
S. Burnett	37	1	0	0.000	0	0
J. Chavez	71	1	0	0.000	0	0
T. Gorzelanny	9	2	0	0.000	0	0
J. Grabow	43	1	0	0.000	0	0
J. Hanrahan	33	1	0	0.000	0	0
S. Jackson	39	1	0	0.000	0	0
V. Vasquez	14	10	0	0.000	0	0
J. Ascanio	2	0	0	—	0	0
D. Bautista	14	0	0	—	0	0
M. Capps	56	0	0	—	0	0
A. Claggett	1	0	0	—	0	0
P. Dumatrait	15	0	0	—	0	0
E. Hacker	3	0	0	—	0	0
C. Hansen	5	0	0	—	0	0
E. Meek	39	0	0	—	0	0
D. Veal	19	0	0	—	0	0
T. Yates	15	0	0	—	0	0
Team totals	161	5,417	1,364	0.252	125	612

Pitching

Note: G = Games pitched; IP = Innings pitched; W = Wins; L = Losses; ERA = Earned run average; SO = Strikeouts

Regular season
Player	G	IP	W	L	ERA	SO
J. Ascanio	2	2 2/3	0	1	6.75	2
A. Claggett	1	1	0	0	9.00	0
E. Hacker	3	3	0	0	6.00	1
K. Hart	10	53 1/3	1	8	6.92	39
M. Capps	57	54 1/3	4	8	5.80	46
V. Vasquez	14	44 2/3	2	5	5.84	29
T. Yates	15	12	0	2	7.50	9
D. Bautista	14	13 2/3	1	1	5.27	15
P. Maholm	31	194 2/3	8	9	4.44	119
C. Bootcheck	13	14 2/3	0	0	11.05	13
Z. Duke	32	213	11	16	4.06	106
I. Snell	15	80 2/3	2	8	5.36	52
D. Veal	19	16 1/3	1	0	7.16	16
J. Karstens	39	108	4	6	5.42	52
C. Morton	18	97	5	9	4.55	62
D. McCutchen	6	36 1/3	1	2	4.21	19
J. Chavez	73	67 1/3	1	4	4.01	47
R. Ohlendorf	29	176 2/3	11	10	3.92	109
P. Dumatrait	15	13	0	2	6.92	7
J. Grabow	45	47 1/3	3	0	3.42	41
C. Hansen	5	6 1/3	0	0	5.68	5
S. Jackson	40	43	2	3	3.14	21
E. Meek	41	47	1	1	3.45	42
J. Hanrahan	33	31 1/3	0	1	1.72	37
S. Burnett	38	32 1/3	1	2	3.06	23
T. Gorzelanny	9	8 2/3	3	1	5.19	7
Team totals	161	1,418 1/3	62	99	4.59	919

== Transactions ==
=== Pre-season ===
(October 29, 2008 – April 4, 2009)

- On December 1, 2008, the Pittsburgh Pirates lost free agent Franquelis Osoria to the Kansas City Royals.
- On December 5, 2008, the Pittsburgh Pirates lost free agent Matt Kata to the Houston Astros.
- On December 5, 2008, the Pittsburgh Pirates signed Boston Red Sox free agent Daniel Haigwood to a minor league contract.
- On December 8, 2008, the Pittsburgh Pirates signed Cleveland Indians free agent Brian Slocum to a minor league contract.
- On December 10, 2008, the Pittsburgh Pirates traded Ronny Paulino to the Philadelphia Phillies in exchange for Jason Jaramillo.
- On December 11, 2008, the Pittsburgh Pirates lost Kyle Bloom to the Detroit Tigers due to the Rule 5 draft.
- On December 11, 2008, the Pittsburgh Pirates acquired Donnie Veal from the Chicago Cubs due to the Rule 5 draft.
- On December 12, 2008, the Pittsburgh Pirates signed free agent Ramon Vazquez to a 2-year contract.
- On December 17, 2008, the Pittsburgh Pirates lost free agent Josh Shortslef to the Philadelphia Phillies.
- On December 22, 2008, the Pittsburgh Pirates signed Denny Bautista, Chris Bootcheck, Garrett Jones, Juan Mateo, Andy Phillips and Jeff Salazar to Minor League contracts.
- On December 22, 2008, the Pittsburgh Pirates signed Ryan Doumit to a 3-year contract extension.
- On January 6, 2009, the Pittsburgh Pirates signed Eliezer Aquino, Jacobo Espiede, Sadid Pontier-Frias, Corey Hamman, Jeffrey Infante, Pedro Lopez, Anderson Machado, Leandro Mejia, Jean Ozoria, Angel Reyes, Eduardo Rodriguez, Carlos Vásquez and Jesus Vasquez to minor league contracts.
- On January 6, 2009, the Pittsburgh Pirates lost free agent Ray Sadler to the Tampa Bay Rays.
- On January 13, 2009, the Pittsburgh Pirates signed Craig Monroe and Miguel Pérez to minor league contracts.
- On January 13, 2009, the Pittsburgh Pirates lost free agent Michael Ryan to the Florida Marlins.
- On January 20, 2009, the Pittsburgh Pirates re-signed Adam LaRoche to a 1-year contract.
- On January 22, 2009, the Pittsburgh Pirates lost free agent Juan Pérez to the Atlanta Braves.
- On January 26, 2009, the Pittsburgh Pirates claimed Virgil Vasquez off of waivers from the San Diego Padres and signed Jason Davis and Hector Gimenez to minor league contracts.
- On January 30, 2009, the Pittsburgh Pirates re-signed Paul Maholm to a 3-year contract extension and signed free agent Eric Hinske to a 1-year contract.
- On February 5, 2009, the Pittsburgh Pirates lost T. J. Beam off of waivers to the Toronto Blue Jays.
- On February 9, 2009, the Pittsburgh Pirates lost free agent Ronald Belisario to the Los Angeles Dodgers.
- On February 17, 2009, the Pittsburgh Pirates re-signed Nate McLouth to a 3-year contract.
- On February 21, 2009, the Pittsburgh Pirates exercised contract option on John Russell as manager through 2010.
- On March 4, 2009, the Pittsburgh Pirates re-signed Andy LaRoche, Brandon Moss, Brian Bixler, Craig Hansen, David Davidson, Donnie Veal, Evan Meek, Jason Jaramillo, Jeff Karstens, Jeff Sues, Jesse Chavez, Jimmy Barthmaier, José Tábata, Luis Cruz, Neil Walker, Nyjer Morgan, Phil Dumatrait, Robinzon Diaz, Rómulo Sánchez, Ronald Uviedo, Ross Ohlendorf, Sean Burnett, Steve Pearce, Steve Lerud, Tom Gorzelanny and Virgil Vasquez to 1-year contracts.
- On March 29, 2009, the Pittsburgh Pirates received returned Rule 5 draft pick Kyle Bloom from the Detroit Tigers.

=== In-Season ===
(April 5, 2009 – November 4, 2009)

- On April 15, 2009, the Pittsburgh Pirates acquired Delwyn Young from the Los Angeles Dodgers in exchange for two players to be named later.
- On April 17, 2009, the Pittsburgh Pirates acquired Mike Dubee from the Chicago White Sox in exchange for Andy Phillips.
- On May 16, 2009, the Pittsburgh Pirates acquired Eric Hacker from the New York Yankees in exchange for Rómulo Sánchez.
- On May 17, 2009, the Pittsburgh Pirates acquired Jeff Corsaletti from the Boston Red Sox and Randy Newsom from the Cleveland Indians in exchange for players to be named later or cash considerations.
- On May 18, 2009, the Pittsburgh Pirates claimed Steven Jackson off of waivers from the New York Yankees.
- On June 3, 2009, the Pittsburgh Pirates acquired Charlie Morton, Jeff Locke and Gorkys Hernández from the Atlanta Braves in exchange for Nate McLouth.
- On June 30, 2009, the Pittsburgh Pirates acquired Eric Fryer and Casey Erickson from the New York Yankees in exchange for Eric Hinske.
- On June 30, 2009, the Pittsburgh Pirates acquired Lastings Milledge and Joel Hanrahan from the Washington Nationals in exchange for Sean Burnett and Nyjer Morgan.
- On July 22, 2009, the Pittsburgh Pirates acquired Argenis Diaz and Hunter Strickland from the Boston Red Sox in exchange for Adam LaRoche.
- On July 29, 2009, the Pittsburgh Pirates acquired Tim Alderson from the San Francisco Giants in exchange for Freddy Sanchez.
- On July 29, 2009, the Pittsburgh Pirates acquired Jeff Clement, Ronny Cedeño, Aaron Pribanic, Brett Lorin and Nate Adcock from the Seattle Mariners in exchange for Ian Snell and Jack Wilson.
- On July 30, 2009, the Pittsburgh Pirates acquired Kevin Hart, José Ascanio and Josh Harrison from the Chicago Cubs in exchange for John Grabow and Tom Gorzelanny.
- On August 12, 2009, the Pittsburgh Pirates claimed Jon Meloan off of waivers from the Tampa Bay Rays.
- On September 2, 2009, the Pittsburgh Pirates lost Jon Meloan off of waivers to the Oakland Athletics.
- On October 17, 2009, the Pittsburgh Pirates announced that Ray Searage was promoted to Major League coaching staff.
- On October 29, 2009, the Pittsburgh Pirates claimed Justin Thomas off of waivers from the Seattle Mariners.
- On October 30, 2009, the Pittsburgh Pirates named Carlos García as first base coach.
- On November 3, 2009, the Pittsburgh Pirates acquired Aki Iwamura from the Tampa Bay Rays in exchange for Jesse Chavez.

== Farm system ==
Level	Team	League	Manager
AAA	Indianapolis Indians	International League	Frank Kremblas
AA	Altoona Curve	Eastern League	Matt Walbeck
A	Lynchburg Hillcats	Carolina League	P. J. Forbes
A	West Virginia Power	South Atlantic League	Gary Green
A-Short Season	State College Spikes	New York–Penn League	Gary Robinson
Rookie	GCL Pirates	Gulf Coast League	Tom Prince
Rookie	DSL Pirates	Dominican Summer League	N/A
Rookie	VSL Pirates	Venezuelan Summer League	Osmin Melendez

LEAGUE CHAMPIONS: Lynchburg
