= Evan Meek =

American baseball player (born 1983)

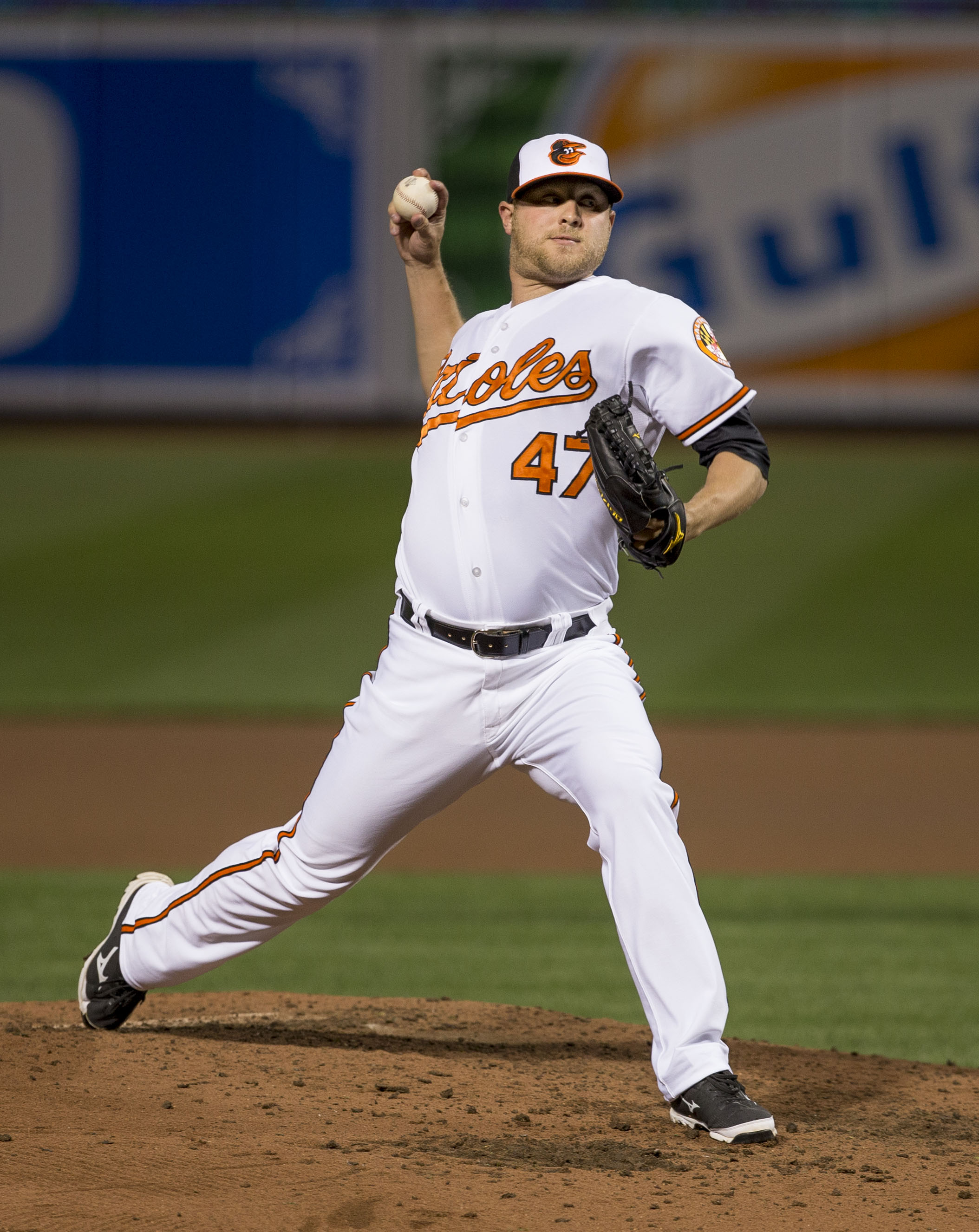
- Meek with the Orioles in 2014
- Pitcher
- Born: May 12, 1983 (age 43); Bellevue, Washington, U.S.
- Batted: Right Threw: Right

Professional debut
- MLB: April 2, 2008, for the Pittsburgh Pirates
- KBO: July 23, 2015, for the Kia Tigers

Last appearance
- MLB: September 25, 2014, for the Baltimore Orioles
- KBO: September 28, 2015, for the Kia Tigers

MLB statistics
- Win–loss record: 7–11
- Earned run average: 3.63
- Strikeouts: 160

KBO statistics
- Win–loss record: 4-0
- Earned run average: 4.44
- Strikeouts: 25
- Stats at Baseball Reference

Teams
- Pittsburgh Pirates (2008–2012); Baltimore Orioles (2014); Kia Tigers (2015)

Career highlights and awards
- All-Star (2010)

Evan David Meek (born May 12, 1983) is an American former professional baseball pitcher. He is best known for giving up Derek Jeter's final hit at Yankee Stadium. He played for the Pittsburgh Pirates and Baltimore Orioles in Major League Baseball (MLB) and was selected to one All-Star Game. Meek has also played for the Kia Tigers of the KBO League.

== Amateur career ==
Meek attended Inglemoor High School in Kenmore, Washington. Afterwards, he played for Midland College in Midland, Texas. Then he transferred at semester to play at Bellevue Community College also in Washington.

== Professional career ==
=== Minnesota Twins ===
After being selected by the Minnesota Twins in the 2002 Major League Baseball draft, Meek began playing for the Twins affiliate in the Appalachian League, the Elizabethton Twins. In 2004, Meek played for Elizabethton and the Quad Cities River Bandits. Meek started the 2005 season with the Beloit Snappers. Meek was released by the Twins in June 2005.

=== San Diego Padres ===
Meek signed with the San Diego Padres in September 2005. He started the 2006 season with the Lake Elsinore Storm. In August 2006, Meek and a player to be named later (Dale Thayer), were traded to the Tampa Bay Devil Rays for Russell Branyan.

=== Tampa Bay Devil Rays ===
Meek finished the 2006 season with the Visalia Oaks. He pitched the 2007 season for the Montgomery Biscuits.

=== Pittsburgh Pirates ===
In the 2007 Rule 5 draft, Meek was selected from the Devil Rays by the Pittsburgh Pirates. This required that Meek remain on the active roster of the Pirates for the entire 2008 season or else the Pirates would have to offer him back to the Devil Rays for half the amount they paid to acquire him.

Meek made his major league debut on April 2, 2008, with the Pittsburgh Pirates. He would record his first career loss in extra innings against the Chicago Cubs on April 7, 2008. Meek made nine relief appearances, going 0–1 with a 6.92 ERA, before being designated for assignment on May 4, 2008. He was offered back per Rule 5 guidelines on May 14. The Pirates paid cash to keep him and sent him down to their minor league teams. After pitching 9 games with the Double-A Altoona Curve, Meek was promoted to the Triple-A Indianapolis Indians.

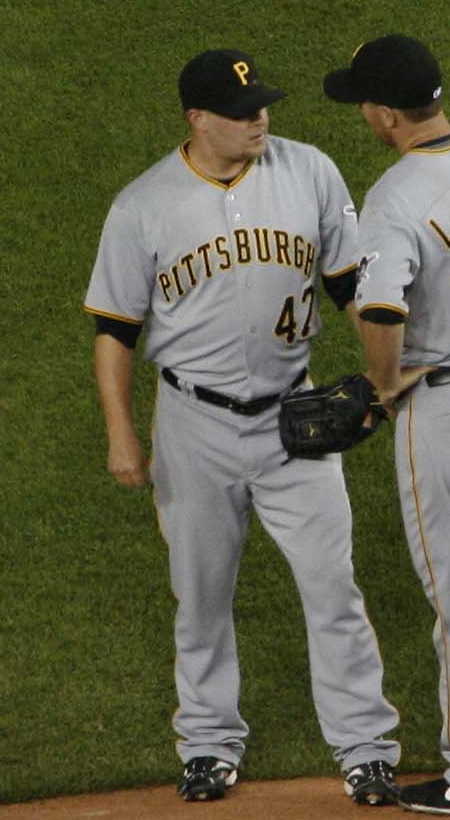
Meek during his tenure with the Pittsburgh Pirates in 2009

Meek spent the 2009 season in the bullpen with the Pirates. He finished the season with a 1–1 record in 41 appearances, had a 3.45 ERA, gave up two home runs, no hit batsmen, 29 walks, 42 strikeouts, a .209 average against, and a 1.34 WHIP, in 47 innings pitched.

The 2010 season was Meek's first full season in the Majors. He was often asked by manager John Russell to pitch multiple innings in relief. Meek's performance rivaled other excellent closers like Joakim Soria and Brian Wilson despite not being one himself. Early in the season when Dotel had given up runs in six straight games as the closer, Meek had an opportunity in the role and earned his first Major League save on April 29, 2010, to close out a 2–0 win over the Los Angeles Dodgers. On May 14, 2010, against the Chicago Cubs at Wrigley Field, Meek entered the game in the 6th inning with the score tied 6–6, and he pitched two scoreless innings of relief, striking out four of the seven Cubs hitters he faced including Derrek Lee, Xavier Nady and Alfonso Soriano in the bottom of the 7th. The Pirates rallied behind his strong pitching to win the game 10–6.

Meek delivered one of his finest performances of the season against the Washington Nationals on June 10, 2010, coming in to relieve Pirates starter Zach Duke with the bases loaded and no outs. He quickly forced Willie Harris to line into a double play before retiring Cristian Guzmán, needing only six pitches to get out of the inning with no runs in. Due to his excellent work, he was named to the 2010 MLB All Star Game. At the time of his selection on July 4, 2010, Meek carried a 4–2 record with a 0.96 ERA, a mark that lead all National League relievers. "It's surprising", Meek said. "A lot of starters and closers go to the game. I've always said there are a lot of great middle relievers out there who deserve to go to the game. I think they're overlooked a little bit. It's amazing to be selected, an overwhelming feeling." Meek was the first Pirate reliever selected who was not a closer since Mace Brown in 1938 – before the closer position emerged. The Pirates celebrated his nomination at PNC Park with an 8–5 victory over the visiting Philadelphia Phillies, a game where Meek was the winning pitcher.

On August 3, 2010, Meek recorded his first career base hit, off fellow reliever Jordan Smith of the Cincinnati Reds. Meek finished the 2010 season with a 2.14 ERA, 70 strikeouts, 4 saves, 15 holds, and a 5–4 record, all career-highs.

After several injuries in 2011, Meek saw a decrease in fastball velocity.

Meek started the 2012 season with Pittsburgh, but on May 1, Meek was optioned to Triple-A Indianapolis. Meek was 0–0 with a 5.59 ERA in 9 games with a .293 opposing batting average. He was recalled to the Pirates on July 21, 2012, after an injury to reliever Juan Cruz. But was sent back down on July 26, to make room for highly anticipated prospect Starling Marté. Meek was designated for assignment by the Pirates on September 10, 2012. In October 2012, Meek elected minor league free agency.

=== Texas Rangers ===
On December 6, 2012, Meek signed a minor league contract with the Texas Rangers that included an invitation to spring training. He made 33 appearances (including 15 starts) for the Triple-A Round Rock Express, compiling a 6–9 record and 4.50 ERA with 80 strikeouts and four saves over 108 innings of work. Meek elected free agency after the season on November 4, 2013.

=== Baltimore Orioles ===
On February 5, 2014, Meek signed a minor league contract with the Baltimore Orioles. After a strong spring training, he made the Opening Day roster. On May 2, he was optioned to the Triple-A Norfolk Tides. He was recalled on May 15, and then designated for assignment on May 16. Instead, the next day Meek was optioned back to Norfolk. On May 28, he was sent outright to Triple-A Norfolk Tides. He had his contract selected to the major leagues again on June 6. On September 25, Meek gave up a walk-off single to New York Yankees future hall-of-famer Derek Jeter in Jeter's final game at Yankee Stadium. Subsequently, it was also Meek's last game in MLB. He was again sent outright to Triple-A Norfolk Tides on October 29. He elected free agency after the season on November 3.

=== Washington Nationals ===
On January 21, 2015, Meek signed a minor league contract with the Washington Nationals. He was released on July 20.

=== Kia Tigers ===
On July 20, 2015, the Kia Tigers of the Korea Baseball Organization announced that they had signed Meek to a one-year deal worth $150,000. Meek filled a roster vacancy created by the club's release of former MLB pitcher Philip Humber on the same day. He became a free agent following the season.

=== Somerset Patriots ===
On May 5, 2016, Meek signed with the Somerset Patriots of the Atlantic League of Professional Baseball. In 10 appearances for Somerset, he logged a 1–0 record and 3.86 ERA with eight strikeouts across 9 1/3 innings of relief. Meek was released by the Patriots on July 20.

=== Lancaster Barnstormers ===
On July 26, 2016, Meek signed with the Lancaster Barnstormers of the Atlantic League of Professional Baseball. He made 15 appearances for the Barnstormers, but struggled to a 1–2 record and 7.24 ERA with 17 strikeouts across 13 2/3 innings pitched. Meek became a free agent after the season.

== Scouting report ==
Meek's four-seam fastball normally sat around 95 mph, although he was capable of reaching 97–98 mph on occasion. It was his primary pitch, throwing it slightly over half the time. Despite missing the final two months of the 2009 Major League Baseball season, he added eight pounds of muscle during the off-season and promised that he would be able to hit 100 mph in 2010. Since his command improved throughout his career – 5.55 walks per 9 innings in 2009 to around 2.10 in 2010 – opposing batters showed more willingness to chase the pitch, even out of the strike zone to due his ability throw his other pitches for strikes.

However, after several injuries in 2011, Meek saw his fastball velocity decrease into the low to mid 90s, ranging from 90 to 95 mph.

Meek's curveball was his primary off-speed pitch, with the velocity sitting around 79–82 mph.

Meek threw a cutter that was rated in August 2009 as the 3rd most effective cutter in Major League Baseball because of its runs above the MLB average. The pitch had "unfair biting" movement, even against left-handed batters, according to Dejan Kovacevic of the Pittsburgh Post-Gazette.

Meek also threw a fourth pitch, an off-speed slider that was seldom used in pressure situations. The pitch normally sat around 80–82 mph, mainly incorporated to keep hitters out of a rhythm. His ability to throw four pitches well made him rare as a relief pitcher as the normal reliever only possessed a three-pitch arsenal.
