= Robinzon Díaz =

Dominican baseball player (born 1983)

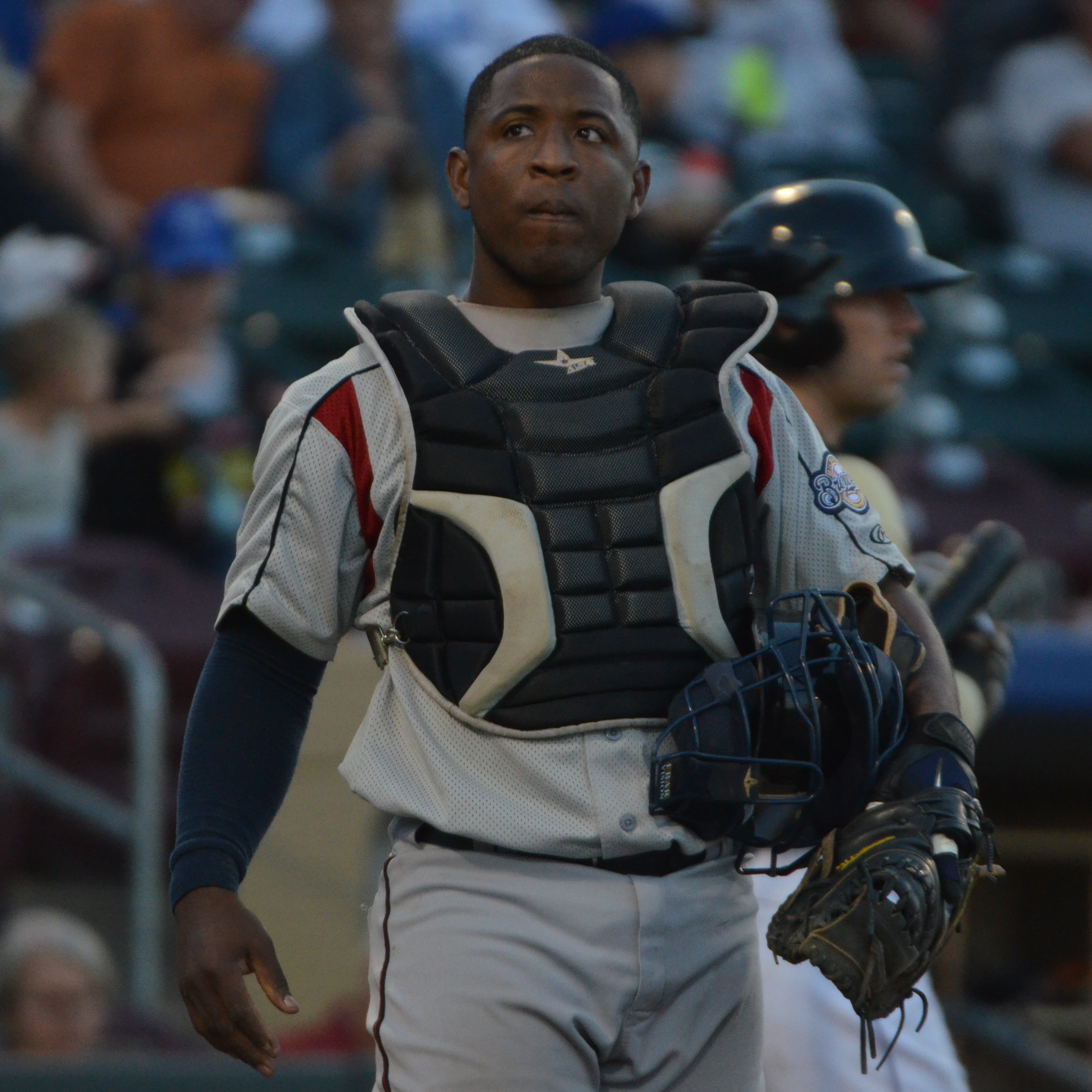
- Díaz during his tenure with the Nashville Sounds
- Catcher / Coach
- Born: September 19, 1983 (age 43); Monte Plata, Dominican Republic
- Batted: Right Threw: Right

MLB debut
- April 23, 2008, for the Toronto Blue Jays

Last MLB appearance
- July 10, 2009, for the Pittsburgh Pirates

MLB statistics
- Batting average: .281
- Home runs: 1
- Runs batted in: 20
- Stats at Baseball Reference

Teams
- As player: Toronto Blue Jays (2008); Pittsburgh Pirates (2008–2009); As coach: Milwaukee Brewers (2017–2020)

Robinzon Díaz Henriquez (born September 19, 1983) is a Dominican former professional baseball catcher. He played in Major League Baseball (MLB) for the Toronto Blue Jays and Pittsburgh Pirates. He was the bullpen catcher for the Milwaukee Brewers from 2017 to 2020.

== Professional career ==
=== Toronto Blue Jays ===
On April 23, 2008, Díaz made his Major League debut with the Toronto Blue Jays against the Tampa Bay Rays and went 0-for-4 with a strikeout.

=== Pittsburgh Pirates ===
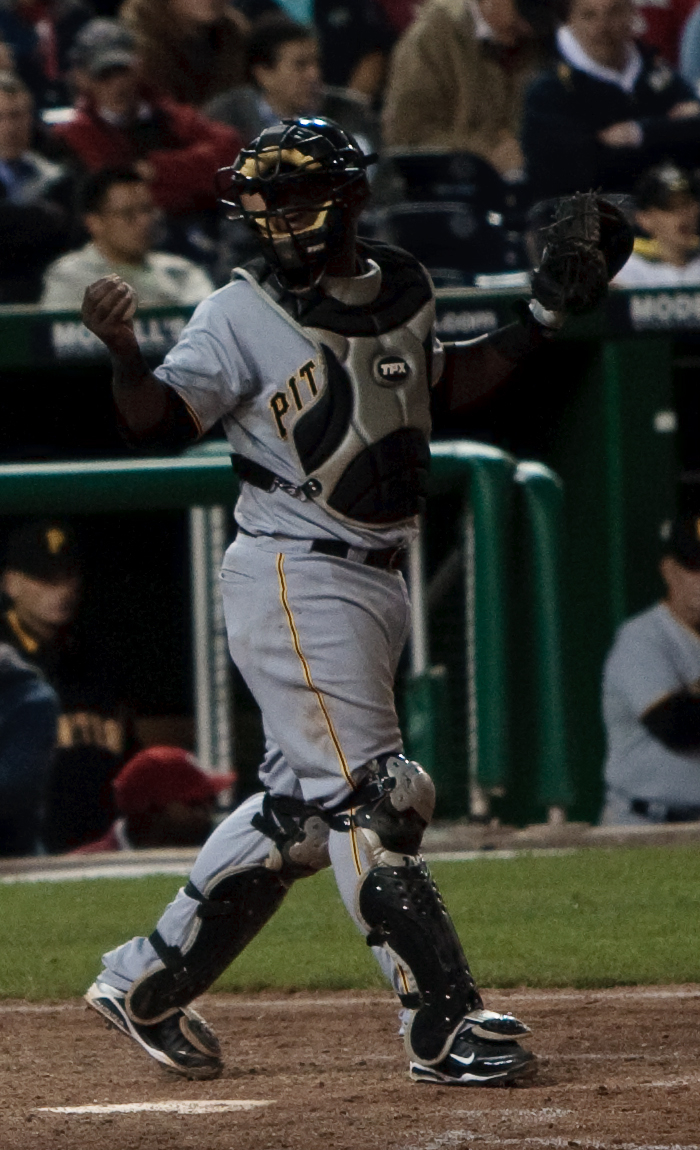
Díaz playing for the Pittsburgh Pirates in 2009

On August 25, 2008, Díaz was traded to the Pittsburgh Pirates as the player to be named later to complete a trade for José Bautista and was assigned to the Triple-A Indianapolis Indians. After spending several days with Indianapolis, he was called up by the Pirates on September 2. On September 7, 2008, Díaz got his first major league hit, a single off San Francisco Giants pitcher Jonathan Sánchez.

Díaz began the 2009 season in Triple-A but was recalled to the Pirates late in April after starting catcher Ryan Doumit became sidelined with a broken wrist. He would serve mainly as backup to fellow rookie catcher Jason Jaramillo and as an occasional pinch hitter. In his 31 games with Pittsburgh, Díaz compiled a .295 batting average and drove in 18 runs. He was optioned back to Triple-A when Doumit returned from injury on July 10.

He was designated for assignment at the end of the 2009 season, and released on November 30, 2009.

=== Detroit Tigers ===
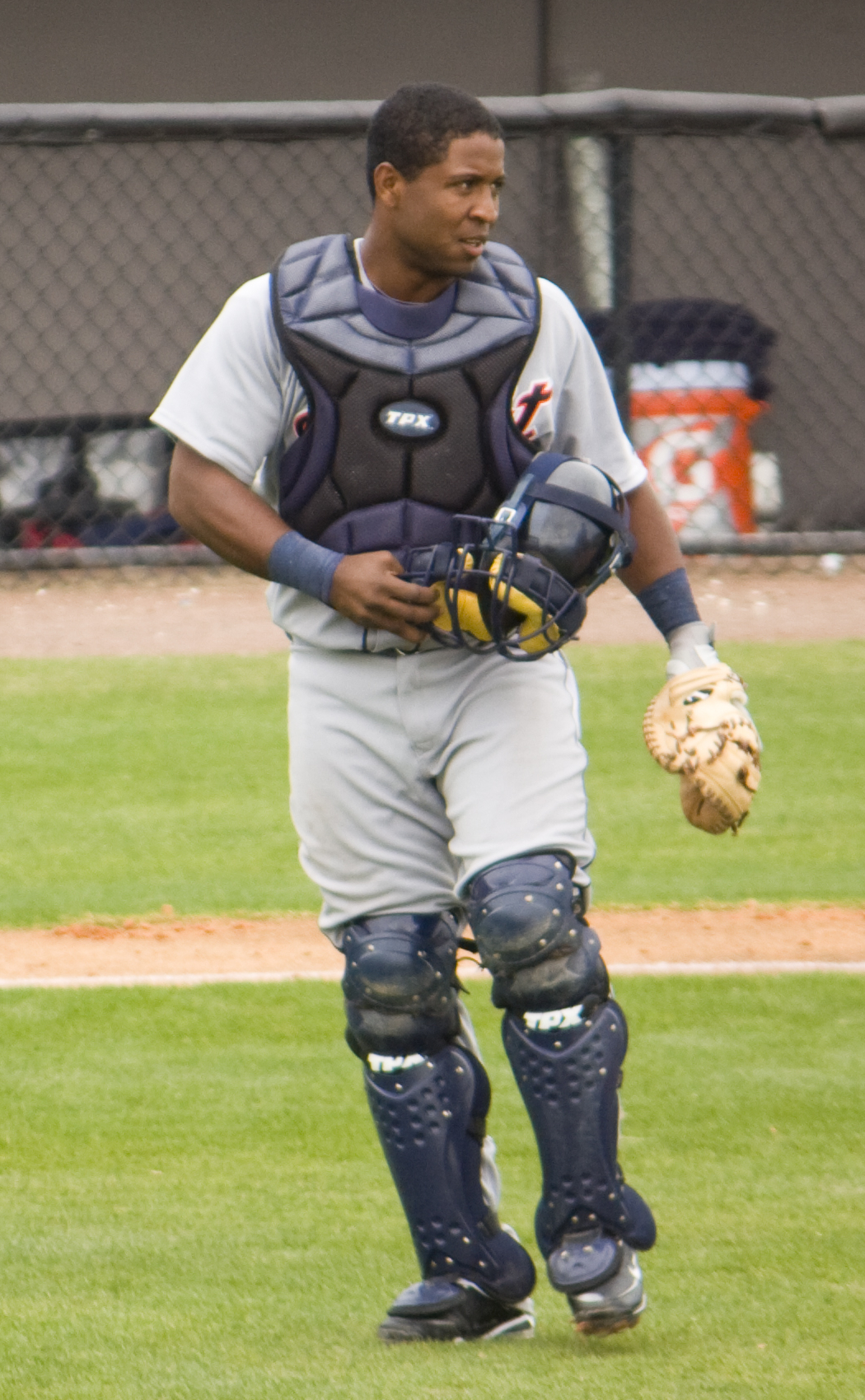
Díaz with the Detroit Tigers in 2010 spring training

On December 8, 2009, he was signed to a contract by the Detroit Tigers.

Díaz spent the 2010 season as a member of the Toledo Mud Hens, finishing the season batting .255 with a home run and 21 RBI in 71 games. He filed for free agency on November 6, 2010.

=== Texas Rangers ===
On January 18, 2011, he was signed to a minor league contract by the Texas Rangers.

He also played for the Tigres del Licey in the Dominican Winter League.

=== Los Angeles Angels of Anaheim ===
Diaz signed a minor league contract with the Los Angeles Angels of Anaheim on December 23, 2011. He was released on August 7, 2012.

=== Return to Texas ===
The Rangers re-signed Diaz to a minor league contract on August 12, 2012, and assigned him to the Triple-A Round Rock Express. On November 3, he was declared a minor league free agent by Major League Baseball.

=== Milwaukee Brewers ===
On January 18, 2013, Díaz signed a minor league contract with the Milwaukee Brewers. He started the 2013 season with the Brewers' Double-A affiliate Huntsville Stars. He split the season with the Stars and Triple-A Nashville, where in 108 games total, he hit .302/.335/.433 with seven home runs and 42 RBI. After joining the Sounds on June 29, 2013, Díaz closed out the year by hitting .328 (58-for-127) with four home runs and 20 RBI in 50 Pacific Coast League games.

On October 1, 2013, Díaz signed a minor league deal with an invitation to spring training with the Brewers. He returned to Nashville for the start of the 2014 season.

The Brewers signed Diaz to another minor-league deal on February 23, 2015. The same day he was assigned to Triple-A Colorado Springs Sky Sox. On April 6, 2015, he was demoted to the Double-A Helena Brewers. On April 17, 2015, he was promoted back to Triple-A Colorado Springs. After the season, he was selected to the roster for the Dominican Republic national baseball team at the 2015 WBSC Premier12.

=== Return to Toronto ===
On February 26, 2016, Díaz signed a minor league contract with the Toronto Blue Jays.

=== Olmecas de Tabasco ===
On May 17, 2016, Diaz signed with the Olmecas de Tabasco of the Mexican League. He was released on July 1, 2016.

== Coaching career ==
Diaz became the bullpen catcher with the Milwaukee Brewers during the 2017 baseball season. He remained in the position through 2020.

Diaz was named as a coach for the Dominican Summer League Brewers for the 2024 season.
