= Frank Kremblas =

American minor league baseball manager (born 1966)

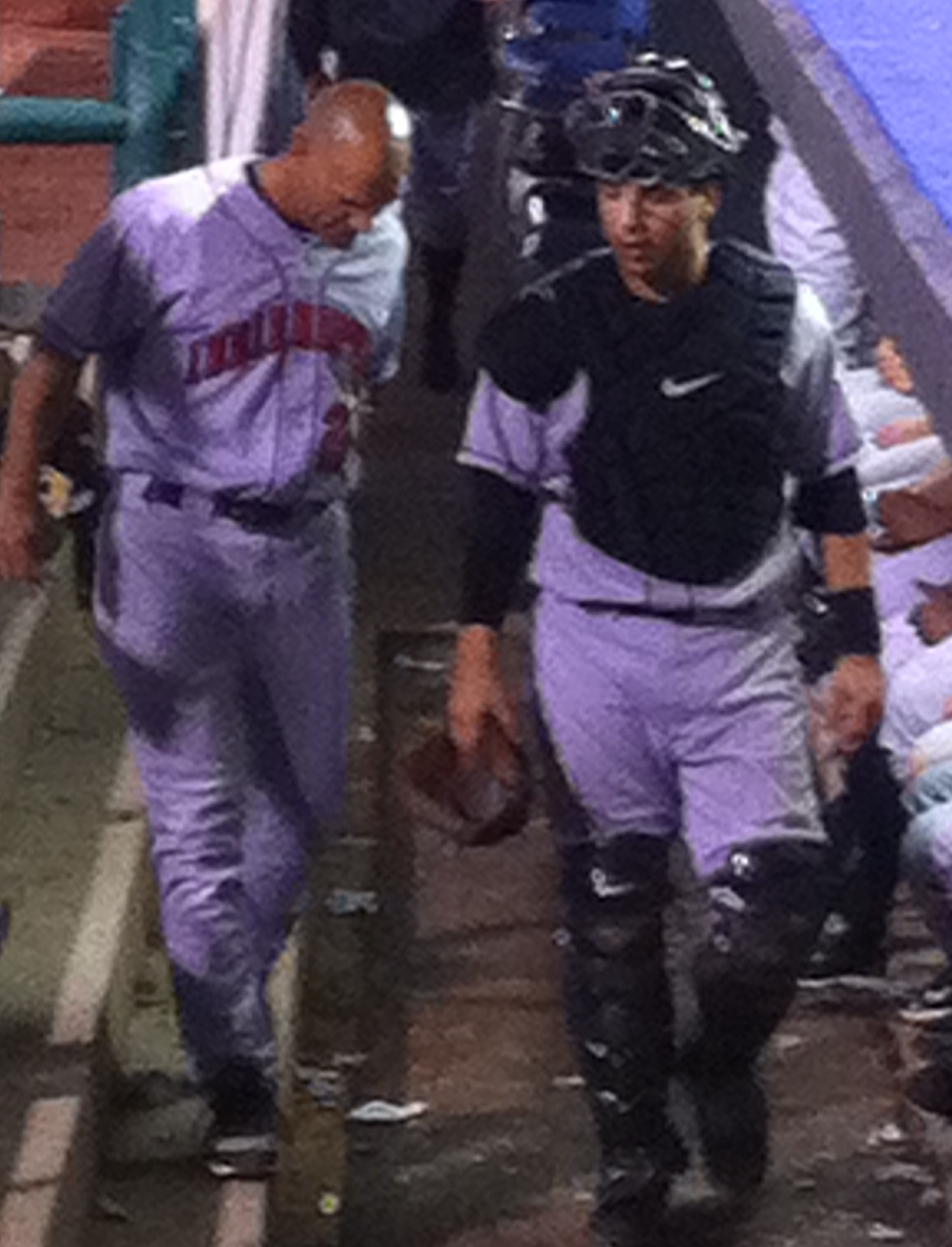
- Kremblas with Jason Jaramillo in 2010
- Manager / Coach
- Born: October 25, 1966 (age 59); Carroll, Ohio, U.S.
- Bats: Right Throws: Right

MLB statistics
- Minor league managerial record: 765-701
- Stats at Baseball Reference

Teams
- As manager: Gulf Coast Expos (1998); Cape Fear Crocs (1999); Mudville Nine (2000); High Desert Mavericks (2001); Huntsville Stars (2002–2004); Nashville Sounds (2005–2007); Indianapolis Indians (2009–2010); Bradenton Marauders (2013); As coach: Pittsburgh Pirates (2014–2015)

Career highlights and awards
- Best Managerial Prospect in the Southern League in a 2004 Baseball America poll; 2005 Pacific Coast League Championship; 2008 Venezuelan Professional Baseball League Manager of the Year

Francis Michael Kremblas Jr. (born October 25, 1966) is an American minor league baseball manager. He previously managed the Indianapolis Indians Triple-A team from 2009–10, and was a former minor league player in the Cincinnati Reds farm system from 1989 to 1996.

== Early and personal life ==
Kremblas was born on October 25, 1966, in Carroll, Ohio. His father, Frank Kremblas, Sr., was a three-year-letter winner on the Ohio State Buckeyes football team from 1956 to 1958 and quarterbacked the team to a share of the 1957 national championship.

Kremblas played baseball at his hometown high school, Canal Winchester High School, where he would later be inducted into its Athletic Hall of Fame in 1997. He went on to play collegiate baseball at Eastern Kentucky University where he was All-Ohio Valley Conference in 1987 and 1988. As a member of the Columbus All-Americans, his team won a Great Lakes Collegiate League title. He was selected by the Cincinnati Reds in the 23rd round of the June 1989 Major League Baseball draft.

== Professional playing career ==
During the 1989 season, Kremblas played for the Gulf Coast Reds Rookie league team. For the 1990 season, he was promoted to the Single-A Cedar Rapids Reds. He was promoted again in 1991 to the Double-A Chattanooga Lookouts. Kremblas spent the 1992 season with the Lookouts before being promoted to the Triple-A Indianapolis Indians in 1993. He would spend the first half of the 1994 season back in Chattanooga before returning to Indianapolis. Again, he spent part of the 1995 season in Chattanooga before finishing up with the Indians. His last season was spent entirely with the Indians after which he retired from his playing career.

During his playing career, he spent most of his time playing in the infield, but he filled-in as a catcher and outfielder. He also pitched a career total of eight appearances, in nine innings.

== Managerial career ==
In 1996, Kremblas was a free agent. He did not get any offers, except from the Montreal Expos as a player-coach, and he served as the hitting coach for the Ottawa Lynx. Two years later, in 1998, the Expos rewarded Kremblas, making him the manager of the Gulf Coast Expos Rookie League team. He was promoted to the Single-A Cape Fear Crocs and spent the 1999 managing that club.

After the California League All-Star break of 2000, he became manager of the Mudville Nine in the Milwaukee Brewers organization, and after the Brewers switched Single-A affiliates in 2001, he guided the High Desert Mavericks to the second round of the California League playoffs. Kremblas managed the Double-A Huntsville Stars from 2002 through 2004. During his time with the Stars he also served as a coach in the 2003 All-Star Futures Game, a coach for the 2003 Arizona Fall League Peoria Saguaros, and as a manager in the 2004 Southern League All-Star Game. In 2005, he was promoted again by the Brewers to manage the Triple-A Nashville Sounds and guided the Sounds to the Pacific Coast League Championship. In both the 2006 and 2007 seasons, he took the team to win the American North Division title before losing in the conference finals, and he was named the PCL Manager of the Year for 2007. After a 59-81 season in 2008, however, Kremblas was released from his position as Nashville's manager. In four years of managing for the Sounds, that was the only season which didn't result in a division title.

In December 2008, Kremblas signed on with the new management team of the Pittsburgh Pirates to manage the Pirates' Triple-A affiliate, the Indianapolis Indians. Kremblas spent the 2009 and 2010 seasons as the Indians' manager. In 2010, Kremblas was named to the coaching staff of the International League in the Triple-A All-Star Game, and that same year he was mentioned by some members of the national media as a possible replacement candidate for the Pirates' manager John Russell. For the 2011 season, the Pirates gave Kremblas the role of Minor League Field Coordinator for the entire organization, and in 2012, Kremblas became a special assistant to Minor League operations in the Pirates' front office. In January 2013, he was named manager of the Pirates' High Class-A affiliate, the Bradenton Marauders.

== Winter league managerial career ==
On April 14, 2008, Kremblas accepted an offer to manage the Caracas Lions (Leones del Caracas), of the Venezuelan Winter League, in October 2008. He became the team's 32nd manager since it was established in 1952. This season marked his third year with a winter league baseball team; he previously coached in Venezuela in 2000 and managed in Mexico in 2004.

With the Leones del Caracas, Kremblas reached a record of 42 wins and 21 losses, setting an all-time record for most wins in a 63-game regular season. Those results were more than enough to grant him, unanimously, the "Manager of the Year" Award.

In the playoffs, Leones had a record of 9–7, reaching the finals against Tigres de Aragua, losing in 7 games. Team president, Luis Avila, confirmed in March 2009 that Kremblas would return to manage the team again for the 2009–10 season, but he refused to manage the team, 3 months later, for personal reasons.

He returned to Venezuelan League in the 2010-11 season as a Manager for the Leones' archrival Navegantes del Magallanes. He had a record of 17 wins and 12 losses when he resigned, probably because of differences with Edgardo Alfonzo, the captain of the team at the time.

Currently he is once again Manager of the Leones del Caracas in the Venezuelan Winter League (2012–13 season) taking the team after five weeks from its beginning, when Rick Sweet was fired.
