= Ronny Paulino =

Dominican baseball player (born 1981)

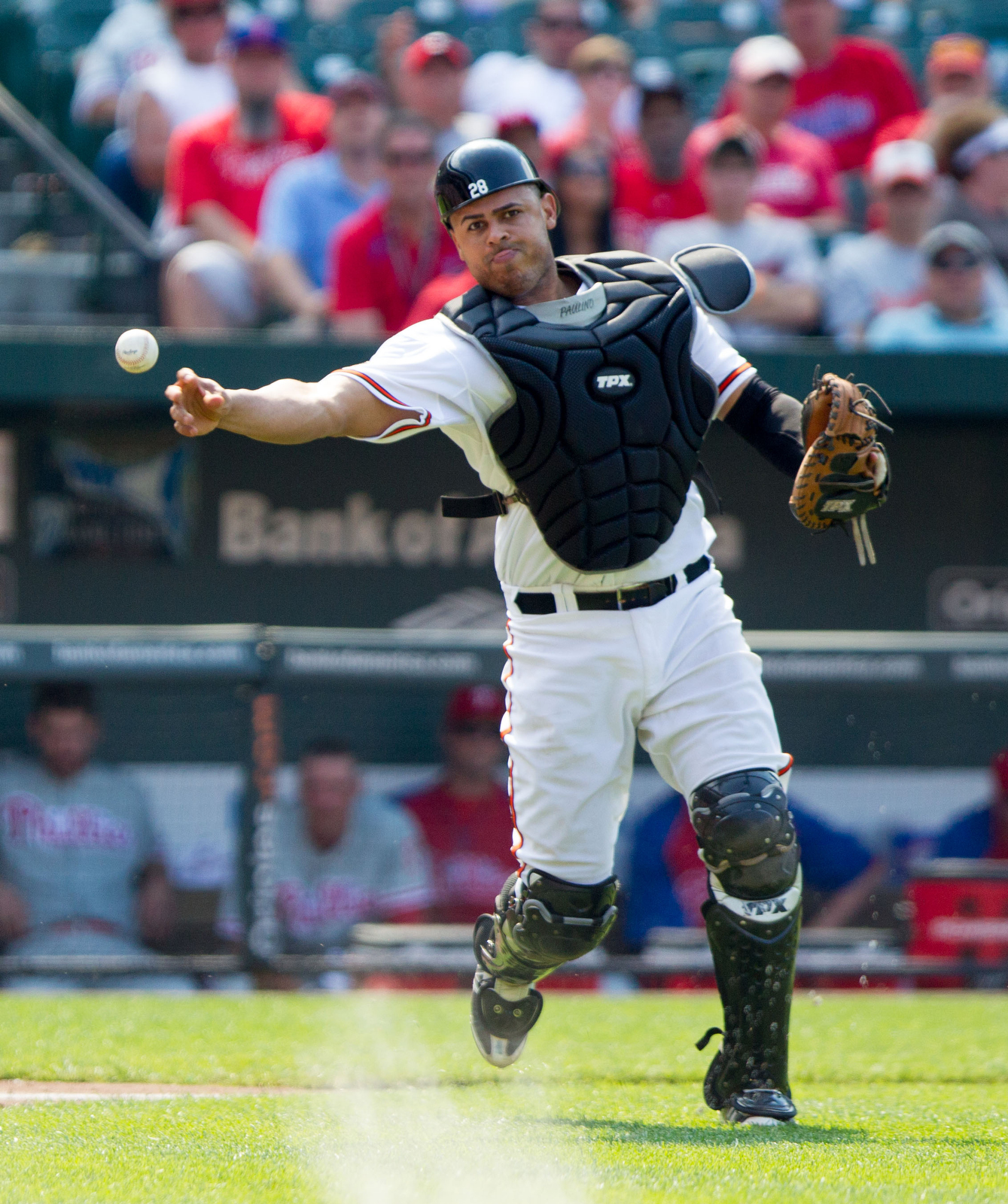
- Paulino with the Baltimore Orioles

Algodoneros de Unión Laguna – No. 29
- Catcher / Manager
- Born: April 21, 1981 (age 45); Santo Domingo, Dominican Republic
- Batted: Right Threw: Right

MLB debut
- September 16, 2005, for the Pittsburgh Pirates

Last MLB appearance
- July 8, 2012, for the Baltimore Orioles

MLB statistics
- Batting average: .272
- Home runs: 33
- Runs batted in: 216
- Stats at Baseball Reference

Teams
- Pittsburgh Pirates (2005–2008); Florida Marlins (2009–2010); New York Mets (2011); Baltimore Orioles (2012)
Medals
Men's baseball
Representing Dominican Republic
Central American and Caribbean Games
Bronze medal – third place	2002 San Salvador	Team
Intercontinental Cup
Bronze medal – third place	2002 Havana	Team

Ronny Leonel Paulino (born April 21, 1981) is a Dominican former professional baseball catcher who currently serves as the hitting coach for the Algodoneros de Unión Laguna of the Mexican League. He played in Major League Baseball (MLB) for the Pittsburgh Pirates, Florida Marlins, New York Mets, and Baltimore Orioles.

== Playing career ==
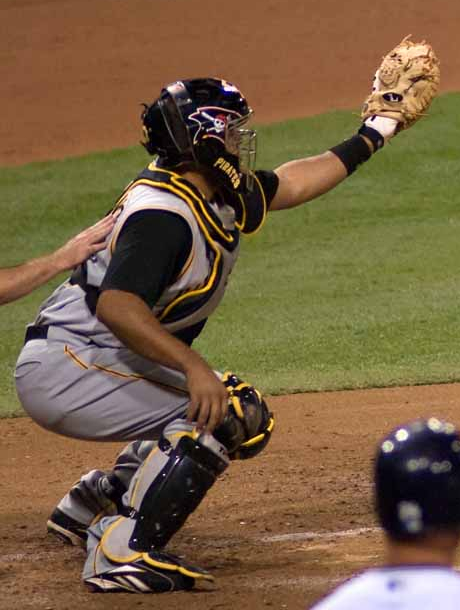
Paulino with the Pittsburgh Pirates in 2007

=== Pittsburgh Pirates ===
Paulino signed as a non-drafted free agent with the Pittsburgh Pirates organization on December 29, 1997, at the age of 16. In 2002, he was selected by the Kansas City Royals in the Rule 5 draft, but he was returned to the Pirates in spring training of the following year. After making his major league debut in September 2005 with the Pirates, Paulino was selected to the Dominican Republic team for the 2006 World Baseball Classic as a backup catcher. The highlight of the World Baseball Classic for Paulino came on March 13, when Paulino started at catcher against the Cuban team. Paulino went 2–2 with a double, three walks, and a run scored in the Dominican's triumph over Cuba. On April 16, 2006, Paulino was recalled to the Major Leagues and quickly became the Pirates every day catcher. Eventually he was again demoted to the Triple-A Indianapolis Indians, as management would give Ryan Doumit the bulk of playing time behind the plate with the Pittsburgh Pirates.

Paulino was praised by the Pirates pitching staff as an excellent catcher to work with. The staff earned run average (ERA) was markedly better when Paulino was behind the plate.

His .310 batting average made him the first rookie catcher since Mike Piazza to play in at least 100 games and bat at least .310. He is only the second rookie catcher since 1969 to have those numbers.

=== Florida Marlins ===
On December 10, 2008, Paulino was traded to the Philadelphia Phillies in exchange for minor league catcher Jason Jaramillo. He was then traded to the San Francisco Giants on March 27, 2009, in exchange for pitcher Jack Taschner. Two hours later he was traded to the Florida Marlins in exchange for pitcher Hector Correa.

With the Marlins, Pauline platooned with left-handed hitting catcher John Baker. After Baker suffered a season-ending injury in May 2010, Paulino took over starting duties for the majority of the season. On August 20, 2010, Paulino received a 50-game suspension for violation of baseball's drug policy. Paulino claimed the positive test was a result of a dietary pill.

=== New York Mets ===
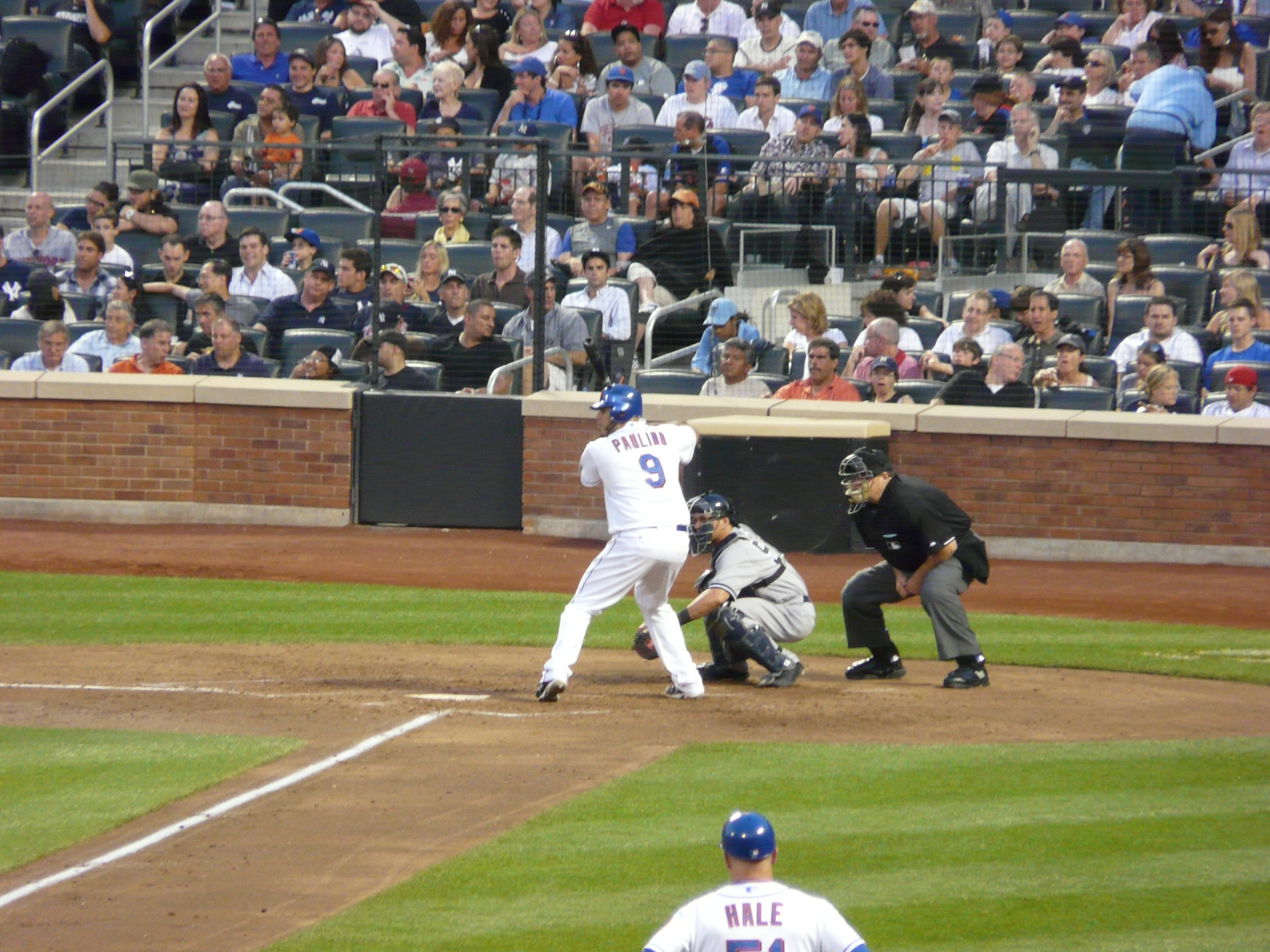
Paulino during the Subway Series

On December 9, 2010, the New York Mets signed Paulino to a one-year, major league contract. On May 1, 2011, in a game against the Philadelphia Phillies, Paulino went 5–7 and hit the game-winning RBI in the 14th inning in his first game as with the Mets. With the news of the death of Osama bin Laden, the al-Qaeda leader who was the mastermind of the September 11 attacks circulating during the game against their rivals, Mets manager Terry Collins said that Paulino delivered "a good win for us, and obviously a huge win for America tonight." On June 8, Paulino hit his first home run with the Mets, a three-run home run off of the Milwaukee Brewers Kameron Loe. In 78 appearances for New York, he batted .268/.312/.351 with two home runs and 19 RBI. On December 13, Paulino became a free agent after the Mets decided not to tender his contract.

=== Baltimore Orioles ===
The Baltimore Orioles signed Paulino to a minor league contract on January 30, 2012. He also received an invitation to spring training, but arrived three weeks late to camp after having visa issues. Paulino made the Orioles' 2012 Opening Day roster after Taylor Teagarden, newly signed by the team to be the backup catcher, went on the disabled list due to back problems. In the second game of the season, Paulino made his first start of the year as the designated hitter and went 4-for-4. On July 15, Paulino was optioned to the Triple-A Norfolk Tides to make room for Teagarden, who was coming off from the 60-day disabled list.

On January 25, 2013, Paulino signed a minor league contract with the Seattle Mariners. He was released prior to the start of the season on March 30.

On May 15, 2013, Paulino signed a minor league contract to return to the Baltimore Orioles organization.

=== Detroit Tigers ===
On August 13, 2013, the Orioles assigned Paulino to the Toledo Mud Hens, the Detroit Tigers Triple-A affiliate. He re-signed with the Tigers on November 13, to fill minor league organizational depth.

On February 12, 2014, Paulino was suspended 100 games by Major League Baseball for a second PED-related offense. He was released by the Tigers organization on July 19.

=== Sultanes de Monterrey ===
On April 28, 2015, Paulino signed with the Sultanes de Monterrey of the Mexican League. In 44 appearances for Monterrey, he batted .273/.356./.413 with four home runs and 19 RBI.

=== Piratas de Campeche ===
On June 24, 2015, Paulino was traded to the Piratas de Campeche of the Mexican League. In 42 appearances for Campeche, he slashed .377/.442/.572 with six home runs and 19 RBI. Paulino was released by the Piratas on February 15, 2016.

=== Vaqueros Laguna ===
On May 3, 2016, Paulino signed with the Vaqueros Laguna of the Mexican League. In 44 games for Laguna, he batted .269/.335/.378 with four home runs and 20 RBI. Paulino was released by the Vaqueros on June 27.

=== Olmecas de Tabasco ===
On July 1, 2016, Paulino signed with the Olmecas de Tabasco of the Mexican League. In 34 games for Tabasco, he batted .313/.355/.420 with three home runs, 15 RBI, and three stolen bases. Paulino was released by Tabasco on February 27, 2017.

== Coaching career ==
=== Los Angeles Dodgers ===
On February 7, 2023, Paulino was hired by the Los Angeles Dodgers organization to serve as the bench coach and hitting coach for their Single-A affiliate, the Rancho Cucamonga Quakes. On February 23, 2024, Paulino was announced as the bench coach for the Double–A Tulsa Drillers.

On August 10, 2024, Paulino was announced as the hitting coach for the Dominican Republic national baseball team in the 2024 WBSC Premier12.

=== Caliente de Durango ===
On February 6, 2025, Paulino was hired to serve as the manager for the Caliente de Durango of the Mexican League. On May 12, Paulino was fired by Durango, with Ramón Orantes being named as his replacement.

== International career ==
He was selected Dominican Republic national baseball team at 2002 Central American and Caribbean Games, 2006 World Baseball Classic, 2019 Pan American Games Qualifier and 2019 Pan American Games.
