= Virgil Vasquez =

American baseball player (born 1982)

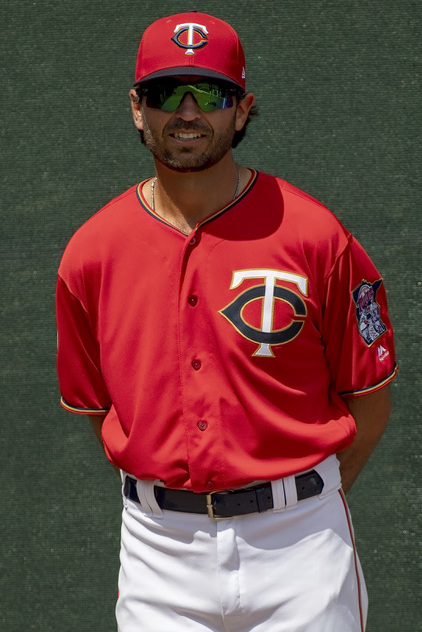
- Vasquez with the Minnesota Twins in 2019
- Pitcher
- Born: June 7, 1982 (age 44); Santa Barbara, California, U.S.
- Batted: Right Threw: Right

MLB debut
- May 13, 2007, for the Detroit Tigers

Last MLB appearance
- October 4, 2009, for the Pittsburgh Pirates

MLB statistics
- Win–loss record: 2–6
- Earned run average: 6.60
- Strikeouts: 36
- Stats at Baseball Reference

Teams
- Detroit Tigers (2007); Pittsburgh Pirates (2009)

Virgil Matthew Vasquez (born June 7, 1982) is an American former right-handed professional baseball pitcher and the current pitching coach for the Toledo Mud Hens, the Triple-A affiliate of the Detroit Tigers. He completed a 12-year professional pitching career with 5 different MLB organizations while appearing in parts of two Major League Baseball seasons with the Detroit Tigers and Pittsburgh Pirates. He has a 101-92 record in his 12 years as a professional pitcher. During 2021 he will serve as the pitching coach of the Wichita Wind Surge.

== Early life and education ==
Vasquez was born in Santa Barbara, California. He went 23-3 in his final two years of high school with 179 strikeouts while also hitting over .400. Vasquez was originally drafted by the Texas Rangers in the 7th round of the 2000 Major League Baseball draft out of Santa Barbara High School, but chose to attend the University of California, Santa Barbara, instead. He finished his college career with 189 strikeouts, the eighth most in school history. Vasquez was then selected by the Detroit Tigers in the seventh round of the 2003 Major League Baseball draft.

== Playing career ==
=== Detroit Tigers ===
Vasquez began the 2006 season with the Double-A Erie SeaWolves of the Eastern League, where he finished in the top ten for earned run average, complete games, home runs allowed, innings pitched, games started and losses. He was promoted to the Triple-A Toledo Mud Hens in early September 2006.

After starting the 2007 campaign in Toledo, he was called up by the Tigers to make a spot start in place of Jeremy Bonderman on May 11. Facing the Minnesota Twins, he allowed six runs in 2.2 innings to take the loss. He jumped back and forth between Detroit and Toledo several times over the remainder of the season. In five games at the major league level, he went 0-1 with an 8.64 ERA.

=== Pittsburgh Pirates ===
After spending all of 2008 in Toledo, he was claimed off waivers by the Boston Red Sox. Two months later, he was claimed off waivers by the San Diego Padres, followed by a third waiver claim by the Pittsburgh Pirates two weeks after that.

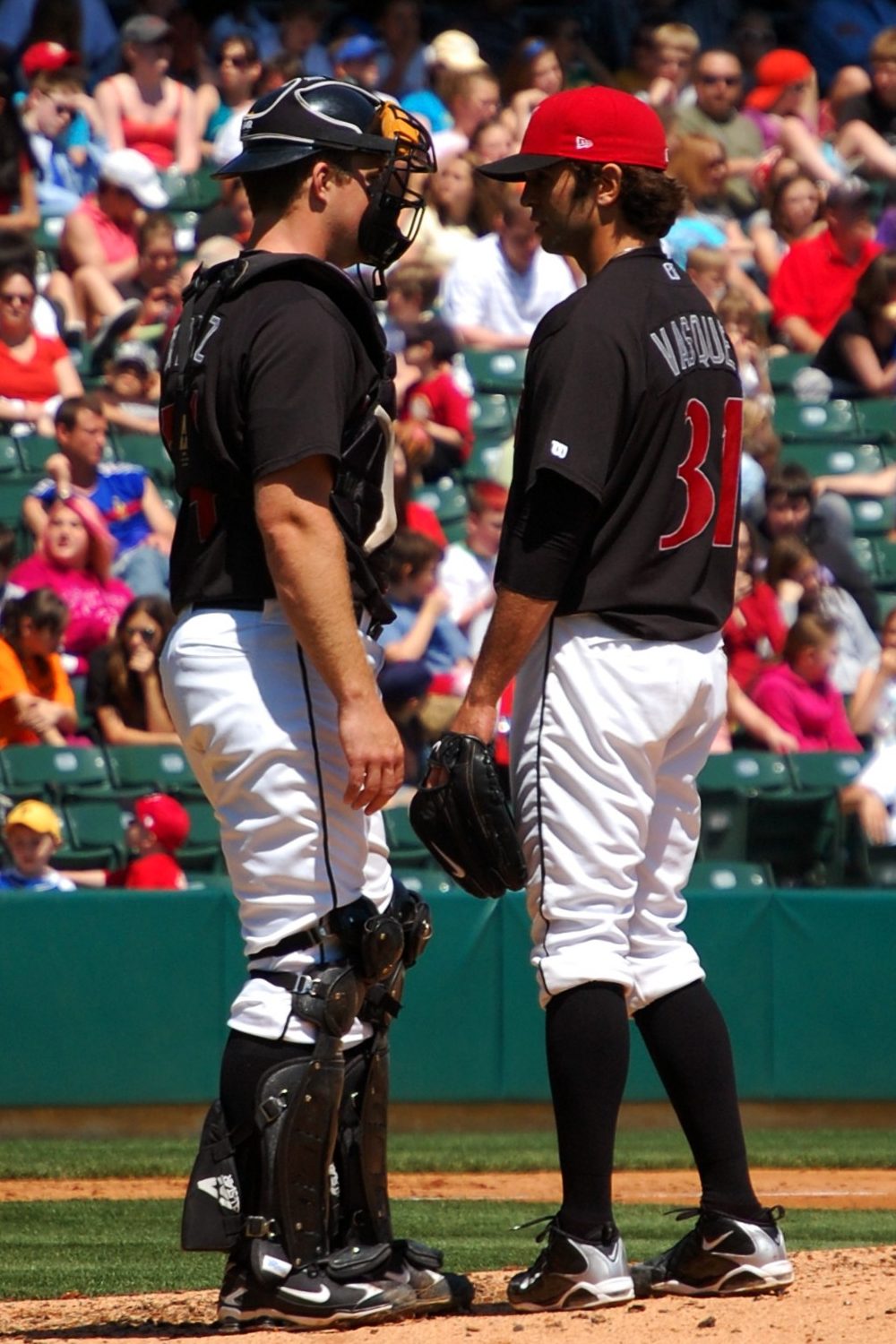
Vasquez (right) with Erik Kratz in 2009

He began the 2009 season with the Triple-A Indianapolis Indians before earning a promotion to the Pirates major league roster on June 26, 2009. He won his first start against the Kansas City Royals, allowing two runs in six innings while striking out seven.

In seven starts and fourteen appearances with the Pirates, he amassed a 2-5 record, with a 5.84 ERA, gave up 58 hits, allowed 29 earned runs, gave up 6 home runs, hit 3 batters, walked 18 batters, struck out 29, in 44.2 innings pitched.

He was traded to the Tampa Bay Rays on April 1, 2010. On April 23, he suffered two broken wrists in a vehicle accident, when the scooter he was driving was hit by a car. After which, he began a vigorous rehabilitation program, to not only return to his original capabilities, but to add to his repertoire a high-speed cutter, movement and command to his fastball, and a curve to throw anytime in the count.

He signed a minor league contract with the Los Angeles Angels in January 2011 but was released in April before he pitched in the organization. He spent the 2011 and 2012 seasons with the Southern Maryland Blue Crabs of the Atlantic League of Professional Baseball.

In August 2014 in his final season as an active pitcher with the AA New Britain Rock Cats, he no-hit the Harrisburg Senators, 9-0.

=== Australian Baseball League ===
Vasquez was called to the Australian Baseball League (ABL) to help the Perth Heat during the 2011-12 Championship season. Vasquez was named the ABL Championship Series MVP for his Game 1 performance. During which he threw a complete game, surrendering 5 hits, and 1 run. Collecting 8 strikeouts and 0 walks over 122 pitches, 92 of them strikes, and in the 9th pitching at 91 mph. "He showed great stamina, as well, maintaining his velocity throughout the contest.... Showing that he is not only healthy, but ready to excel once again."

He returned to the Perth Heat the following ABL season where he was signed by the Minnesota Twins.

The Melbourne Aces called upon Vasquez as a pitcher and pitching coach in the 2015-16 & the 2016-17 seasons and then fully into the pitching coach role for the 2017-18 season.

During his time in the ABL, he has coached alongside; Jon Deeble, Joe Vavra, Jim Bennett, Craig Albernaz, Phil Dale, & Peter Moylan. He has also been a part of 4 ABL All-Star Games.

== Coaching career ==
Vasquez started his coaching career with the GCL Twins from 2015-2017.

In 2018, under the new Twins leadership of Derek Falvey & Thad Levine, a progressive use of analytics was adopted. Vasquez split the season, coaching half in Extended Spring Training and the other in AA with the Chattanooga Lookouts as the assistant pitching coach under Ivan Arteaga.

In 2019, Vasquez was the pitching coach for the Cedar Rapids Kernels. With the Kernels, he created a positive environment of growth while using cutting-edge technology that propelled his pitching staff to the playoffs while setting a franchise record in strikeouts at 1,240 while the Twins minor league system, as a whole, led all MiLB in FIP at 3.37.

2021, Vasquez is a co-pitching coach with Luis Ramirez for the Wichita Wind Surge, the AA affiliate with the Twins.

During his time as a professional coach, he has worked alongside; Bob McClure, LaTroy Hawkins, Tommy Watkins, Josh Kalk, Jeremy Zoll, Alex Hassen, Tony Diaz, Pete Maki, Cibney Bello, Justin Willard, Brian Dinkelman, Ramon Borrego, Jared Gaynor, Billy Boyer, Tanner Swanson, Pete Fatse, Luis Ramirez, Ryan Smith, Zach Bove and Daniel Adler. He has also had 4 playoff berths as a coach.

In 2025, he was named assistant pitching coach of the Toledo Mud Hens the Triple-A affiliate of the Detroit Tigers.
