= Jason Jaramillo =

American baseball player (born 1982)

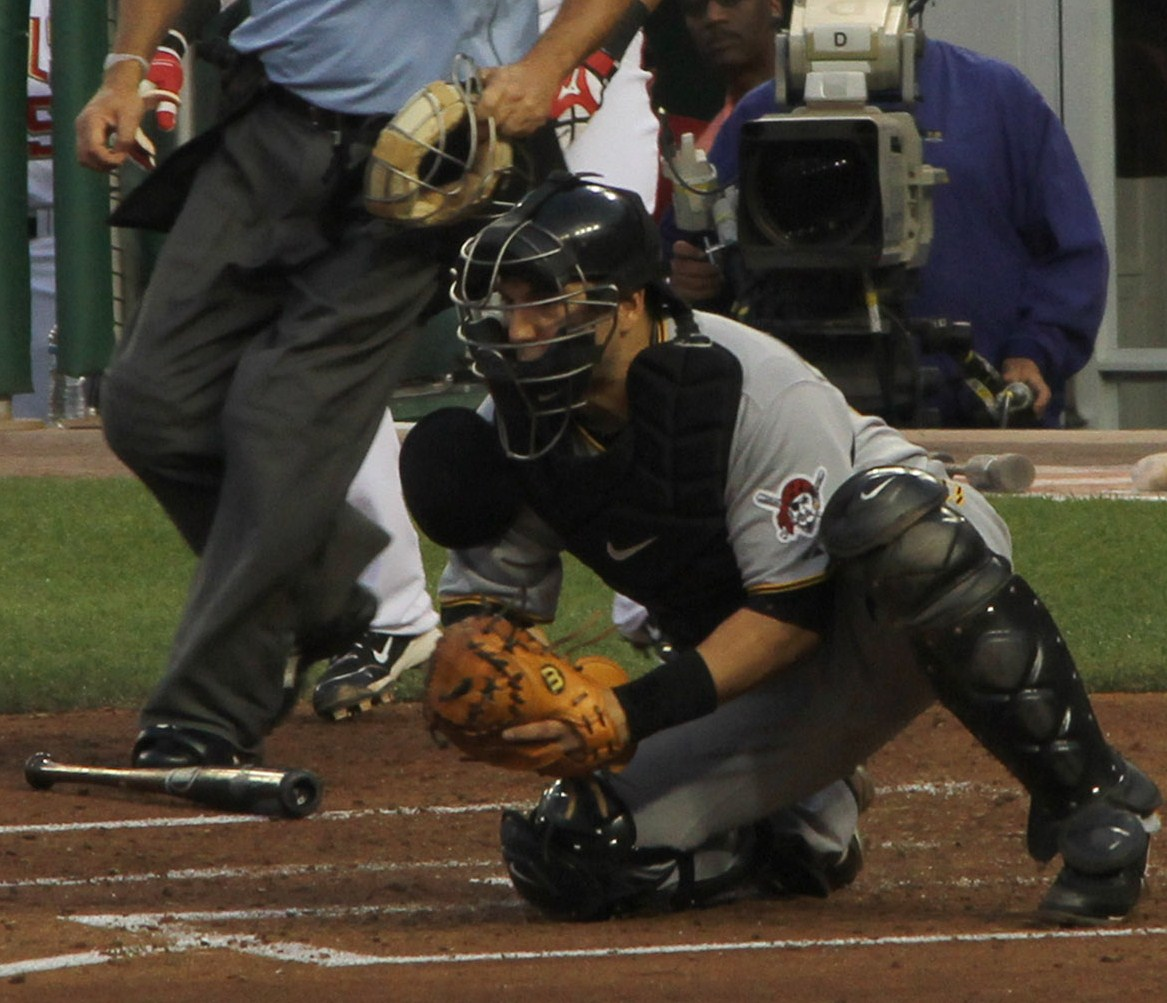
- Jaramillo with the Pittsburgh Pirates
- Catcher
- Born: October 9, 1982 (age 43); Racine, Wisconsin, U.S.
- Batted: Switch Threw: Right

MLB debut
- April 16, 2009, for the Pittsburgh Pirates

Last MLB appearance
- September 28, 2011, for the Pittsburgh Pirates

MLB statistics
- Batting average: .235
- Home runs: 4
- Runs batted in: 38
- Stats at Baseball Reference

Teams
- Pittsburgh Pirates (2009–2011)
Medals
Men's baseball
Representing United States
Baseball World Cup
Gold medal – first place	2007 Tianmu	National team

Jason Cory Jaramillo (born October 9, 1982) is an American former professional baseball catcher. He played in Major League Baseball (MLB) from 2009 to 2011 for the Pittsburgh Pirates.

== Amateur career ==
Jaramillo attended Oklahoma State University, and in 2003 he played collegiate summer baseball with the Orleans Cardinals of the Cape Cod Baseball League.

== Professional career ==
=== Philadelphia Phillies ===
Jaramillo, who is of Mexican descent, was drafted by the Philadelphia Phillies in the second round of the 2004 Major League Baseball draft. Jaramillo played 2004 with the Low-A Batavia Muckdogs, where in 31 games, he hit .223 with one home run and 14 RBI. Jaramillo played 2005 with the Single-A Lakewood BlueClaws, where in 119 games, he hit .304 with eight home runs and 63 RBI, and he was an All-Star. Jaramillo was also ranked one of the top ten prospects in the Phillies system for the 2005 season. Jaramillo played 2006 with the Double-A Reading Phillies, where in 93 games, he hit .258 with six home runs and 39 RBI. He also played two games with the Triple-A Scranton/Wilkes-Barre Red Barons. After the season, Jaramillo played in the Arizona Fall League with Peoria Saguaros, where in 17 games, he hit .379 with two home runs and 17 RBI. Jaramillo spent the 2007 campaign with the Triple-A Ottawa Lynx, where in 118 games, he hit .271 with six home runs and 56 RBI. Jaramillo spent the 2008 season with the Triple-A Lehigh Valley IronPigs, where in 115 games, he hit .266 with eight home runs and 39 RBI.

=== Pittsburgh Pirates ===
On December 10, 2008, Jaramillo was traded to the Pittsburgh Pirates in exchange for catcher Ronny Paulino. Jaramillo made the Pirates' Opening Day roster as the backup catcher to Ryan Doumit. Jaramillo made his Major League debut on April 16, 2009; he acquired his first hit in the fourth inning, off Houston Astros pitcher, Russ Ortiz. On April 21, Doumit went on the disabled list with a broken wrist, and Jaramillo became the starter, with Robinzon Díaz as his backup. He had a good April, hitting .345 with three RBI. He had a less solid May, and Díaz earned more starts in the month. He hit his first major league home run, on June 2 against the Mets off of Johan Santana, tying the game at 1. When Doumit returned on July 10, Jaramillo was kept, and Díaz was optioned. He played only 5 games in July, 7 games in August, and 10 in September to finish the season. In 63 games, he hit .252 with three home runs and 26 RBI.

Jaramillo began 2010 as the backup catcher to Doumit. Jaramillo went 4–for-17 in April, 4–for-22 in May and 3–for-26 in June. On July 12, Jaramillo was demoted to the Triple-A Indianapolis Indians, and was replaced as backup catcher by Erik Kratz. When Doumit went down with a concussion on July 22, Jaramillo was recalled to split time with Kratz. He played in 4 games with the Pirates before being optioned when Chris Snyder was acquired. Jaramillo was recalled on September 7 after Indianapolis's season had ended, and Kratz was designated for assignment, making Jaramillo the third catcher. In 33 games with the Pirates, he hit .149 with one home run and six RBI.

Jaramillo made the 2011 Opening Day roster, due to Snyder being placed on the disabled list to begin the season. On April 14, Jaramillo was optioned to Indianapolis. On May 27, he suffered an arm injury, and after 7 rehab games with the rookie-level Gulf Coast League Pirates, he returned on July 20. On September 1, Jaramillo was recalled when the rosters expanded and was used mostly off the bench. In 23 games with Pittsburgh, he hit .326 (14-for-43) with three doubles and six RBI. On December 7, Jaramillo was designated for assignment, and he elected free agency five days later after being non-tendered by Pittsburgh.

=== Milwaukee Brewers ===
On December 23, 2011, Jaramillo signed a minor league contract with the Chicago Cubs. He was released prior to the start of the season on March 27, 2012.

On March 29, 2012, Jaramillo signed a minor league contract with the Milwaukee Brewers. He was assigned to the Double-A Huntsville Stars and was their Opening Day catcher. On May 29, Jaramillo was promoted to the Triple-A Nashville Sounds. In 34 games with the Stars, he hit .258 with eight doubles and 12 RBI. On August 14, Jaramillo was released by the Brewers organization.

=== Oakland Athletics ===
On August 21, 2012, Jaramillo signed with the Oakland Athletics and was assigned to the Triple-A Sacramento River Cats, where he played in 11 games contests. In 52 games with Nashville and Sacramento, he hit .198 with two home runs and 17 RBI. After the season, Jaramillo became a free agent.

=== Houston Astros ===
On January 4, 2013, Jaramillo signed a minor league contract with the Houston Astros. Jaramillo began the year with the Triple-A Oklahoma City RedHawks, where in 23 games, he hit .130 with four extra-base hits and seven RBI. On June 1, Jaramillo was released by the Astros organization.

=== Seattle Mariners ===
On June 9, 2013, Jaramillo signed a minor league contract with the Seattle Mariners, and was assigned to the Triple-A Tacoma Rainiers. In 38 games with Tacoma, he hit .257 with two home runs and 15 RBI. Jaramillo elected free agency following the season on November 4.
