= John Russell (catcher) =

American baseball player and manager (born 1961)

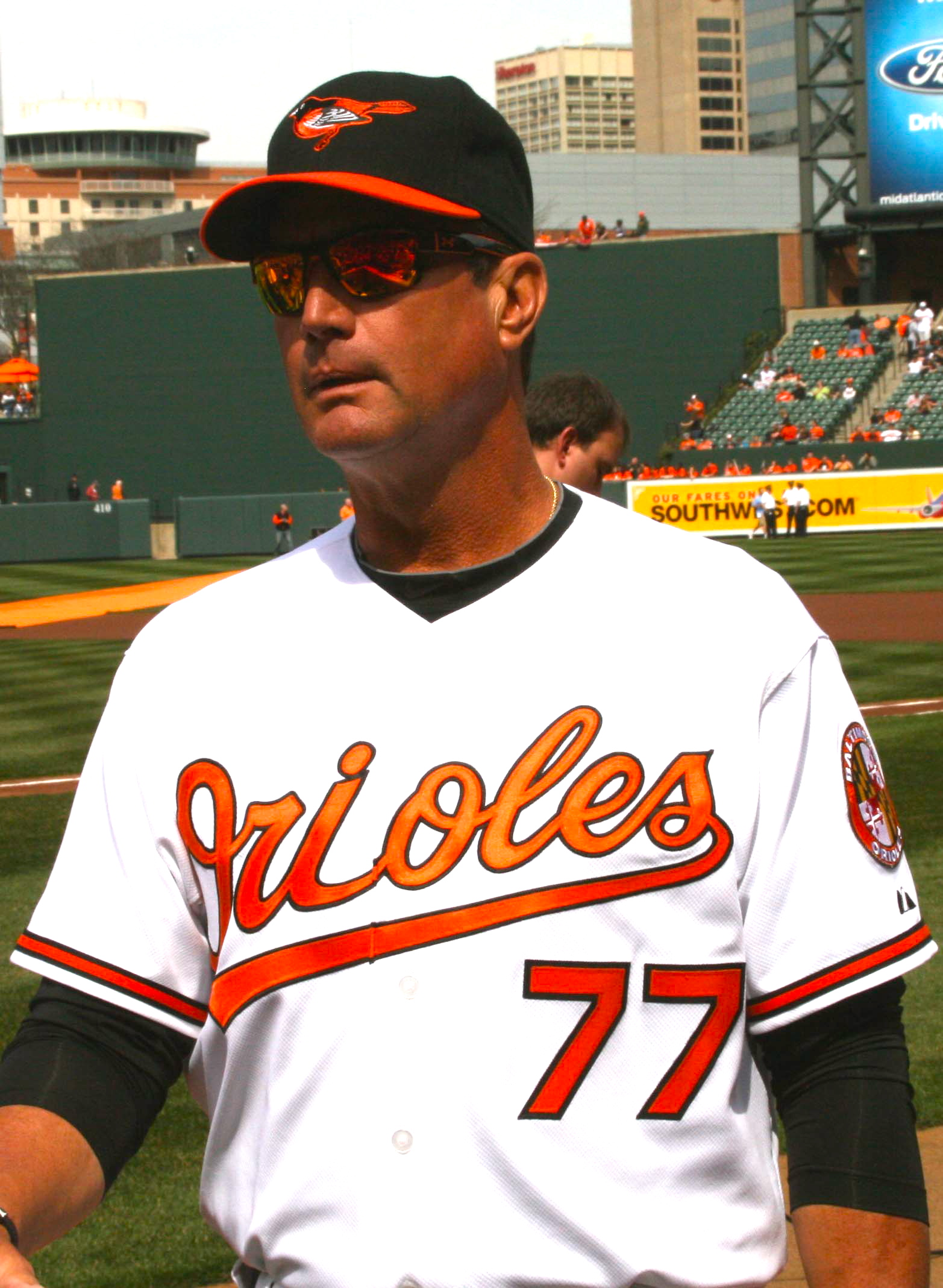
- Russell as coach with the Baltimore Orioles in 2011
- Catcher / Outfielder / Manager
- Born: January 5, 1961 (age 65); Oklahoma City, Oklahoma, U.S.
- Batted: Right Threw: Right

MLB debut
- June 22, 1984, for the Philadelphia Phillies

Last MLB appearance
- October 2, 1993, for the Texas Rangers

MLB statistics
- Batting average: .225
- Home runs: 34
- Runs batted in: 129
- Managerial record: 186–299
- Winning %: .384
- Stats at Baseball Reference
- Managerial record at Baseball Reference

Teams
- As a player: Philadelphia Phillies (1984–1988); Atlanta Braves (1989); Texas Rangers (1990–1993); As manager: Pittsburgh Pirates (2008–2010); As a coach: Pittsburgh Pirates (2003–2005); Baltimore Orioles (2011–2018)
Medals
Men's baseball
Representing the United States
World Games
Gold medal – first place	1981 Santa Clara	Team competition

John William Russell (born January 5, 1961) is an American former catcher and outfielder in Major League Baseball (MLB), and former manager of the Pittsburgh Pirates. He played 10 seasons from 1984 to 1993 with the Philadelphia Phillies, Atlanta Braves and Texas Rangers, mostly as a platoon or reserve player.

== Playing career ==
Born in Oklahoma City, Russell attended Norman High School in Norman, Oklahoma, and played college baseball for the University of Oklahoma after being selected by the Montreal Expos in the 4th round (88th overall) of the 1979 MLB draft. In 1982 he was selected by the Phillies in the 1st round and the 13th overall pick in the draft. In May 1984, Russell was one of three ejections in a minor league game. On May 27, 1984, Portland Beavers manager Lee Elia, angered over a call, was ejected by umpire Pam Postema. Elia tossed a folding chair onto the field before leaving the dugout. Beavers bat boy Sam Morris refused instructions of Postema to remove the chair and the bat boy himself was ejected. John Russell sprinted in from the outfield to come to the defense of the fourteen year old Morris and Russell himself was ejected for his efforts. Both Elia and Russell were fined by the league $25, as was standard for players and coaches ejected from a minor league game. An exception was made for the bat boy and he was not fined.

Russell made his major league debut with the Phillies on June 22, 1984, and stayed with the team through the 1988 season. After spending most of his first two seasons as a backup left fielder, he was the team's principal catcher in 1986 due to Darren Daulton suffering a year-ending injury, and batted .241 with 13 home runs and 60 runs batted in. It was the Phillies' only winning season in his five years with the team, but they finished a distant second place in the division behind division rival and eventual champion New York Mets. He saw very little playing time in the next two years. He spent 1989 with the Braves, who purchased his contract in spring training. When the Braves released him at the beginning of the 1990 season he moved on to the Rangers, for whom he played until his retirement in 1993. While with the Rangers he caught Nolan Ryan's 6th career no-hitter on June 11, 1990. He ended his career with a .225 batting average, 34 home runs and 129 RBI in 448 games.

== Coaching career ==
=== Early positions ===
Upon his retirement as a player, he became a minor league manager for the Minnesota Twins. In 1999 he was named as the best Double-A managerial prospect by Baseball America. He left the Twins organization after the 2000 season; he interviewed with the Phillies for their vacant managerial spot, but the job went to Larry Bowa. Eventually he re-joined the Minnesota Twins as manager of the Edmonton Trappers. In 2002 Russell led Edmonton to a Pacific Coast League title, and was again honored by Baseball America, being named the best managerial prospect in the minors. The following year he was named the Pirates third-base coach, a job he held from 2003 to 2005. Russell was unpopular among some Pirates fans because of the frequency of runners he waved home that were thrown out at the plate. He was eventually fired, along with the rest of Lloyd McClendon's coaching staff, in 2005. After being fired Russell was named as manager of the Phillies AAA team, the Scranton/Wilkes-Barre Red Barons, a position he held through 2006, until the Phillies switched affiliates to the Ottawa Lynx in 2007, with Russell still at the helm.

=== Pittsburgh Pirates manager ===
Prior to the 2007 season, Russell interviewed for the Texas Rangers managerial vacancy; the position ultimately went to longtime Oakland A's third-base coach Ron Washington. On November 5, 2007, he was introduced as the Pirates manager, replacing Jim Tracy. In February 2009, the Pirates extended his contract through the 2010 season. During the 2010 season, the Pirates announced that Russell's contract had been extended through the 2011 season; though the extension occurred during the previous off season, the Pirates waited until June to announce the new contract, a move unpopular with many fans. On October 4, 2010, Russell was fired as the Pirates manager after a 105-loss season and an overall record of 186–299.

=== Baltimore Orioles coach ===
On November 15, 2010, Russell was hired as the third base coach of the Baltimore Orioles. Due to ongoing knee issues, he traded coaching positions with Willie Randolph and became Bench Coach in June 2011. Russell's contract expired after the 2018 season.

=== Tacoma Rainiers manager ===
On January 23, 2023, Russell was announced as the new manager for the Tacoma Rainiers.

=== Managerial record ===
As of August 17, 2015

Team	Year	Regular season					Postseason			
Team	Year	Games	Won	Lost	Win %	Finish	Won	Lost	Win %	Result
PIT	2008	162	67	95	.414	6th in NL Central	–	–	–	–
PIT	2009	161	62	99	.385	6th in NL Central	–	–	–	–
PIT	2010	162	57	105	.352	6th in NL Central	–	–	–	–
PIT total		485	186	299	.384		–	–	–	–
Total		485	186	299	.384					

== Personal life ==
Russell is married to wife Jamie. He has three sons: Stone, Brooks and Steel. The Orioles drafted Steel Russell in 2012. He spent parts of four seasons in the Orioles system and one with the Perth Heat of the Australian Baseball League.

Sporting positions
Preceded by Ray Smith	Elizabethton Twins manager 1995	Succeeded by Jose Marzan
Preceded by Al Newman	Fort Myers Miracle manager 1996–1997	Succeeded by Mike Boulanger
Preceded by Al Newman	New Britain Rock Cats manager 1998–2000	Succeeded by Stan Cliburn
Preceded by Garry Templeton	Edmonton Trappers manager 2001–2002	Succeeded by Dave Huppert
Preceded by Trent Jewett	Pittsburgh Pirates third base coach 2003–2005	Succeeded by Jeff Cox
Preceded by Gene Lamont	Scranton/Wilkes-Barre Red Barons manager 2006	Succeeded by last manager
Preceded by Dave Trembley	Ottawa Lynx manager 2007	Succeeded by last manager
Preceded by Jeff Datz	Baltimore Orioles bench coach 2011–2018	Succeeded by Tim Cossins
