= Ryan Doumit =

American baseball player (born 1981)

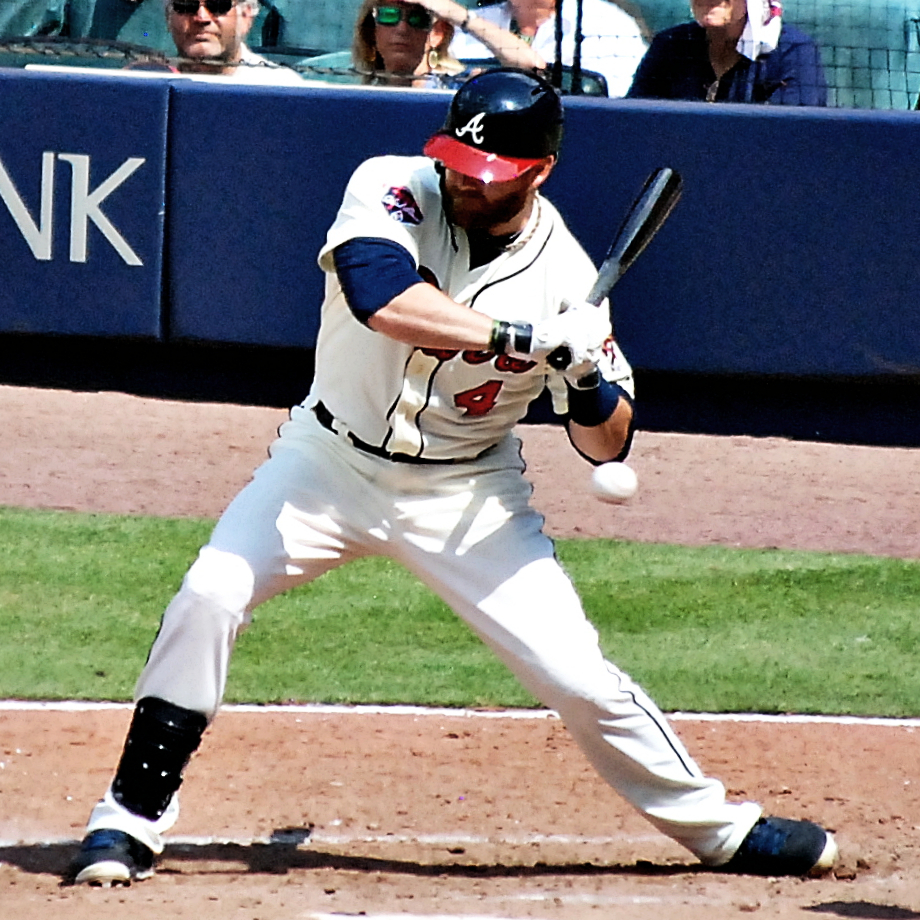
- Doumit with the Atlanta Braves
- Catcher
- Born: April 3, 1981 (age 45); Moses Lake, Washington, U.S.
- Batted: Switch Threw: Right

MLB debut
- June 5, 2005, for the Pittsburgh Pirates

Last MLB appearance
- September 28, 2014, for the Atlanta Braves

MLB statistics
- Batting average: .264
- Home runs: 104
- Runs batted in: 413
- Stats at Baseball Reference

Teams
- Pittsburgh Pirates (2005–2011); Minnesota Twins (2012–2013); Atlanta Braves (2014)

Ryan Matthew Doumit (/ˈdoʊmɪt/ DOH-mit; born April 3, 1981) is an American former professional baseball catcher in Major League Baseball (MLB). He played the first seven years of his career for the Pittsburgh Pirates, then two for the Minnesota Twins, and one for the Atlanta Braves.

== High school career ==
He attended Moses Lake High School, where he had an excellent high school career, setting state records in several categories.

== Professional career ==
=== Pittsburgh Pirates ===
Doumit was drafted by the Pittsburgh Pirates in the 2nd round as the 59th overall selection in the 1999 Major League Baseball draft.

After six seasons in the minor leagues, Doumit made his major league debut on June 5, 2005, against the Atlanta Braves. During his rookie season, Doumit played primarily as a backup catcher but also served as the Pirates' designated hitter in interleague games.

Over the next two seasons, Doumit suffered a variety of injuries, limiting him to 144 games. When healthy, he saw action as a catcher, first baseman, and right fielder.

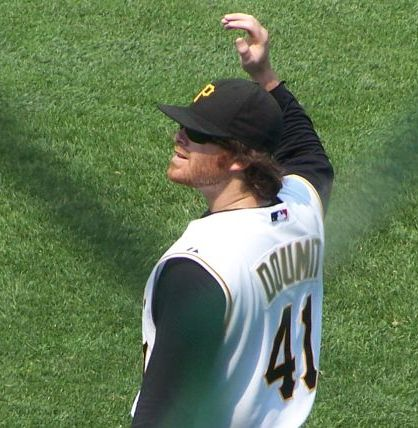
Doumit during his tenure with the Pittsburgh Pirates

In 2008, Doumit played exclusively as the Pirates' starting catcher. He was once again plagued by injury and missed three weeks with a broken thumb. He returned to the lineup and consistently kept his batting average above .330 throughout the rest of the summer. Doumit shared the National League's Player of the Week award for the week ending June 16, 2008, hitting .400 and 4 home runs during the week. On September 26, Doumit attempted to throw out Willie Harris trying to steal 2nd base, but instead plunked Pirates pitcher John Grabow; see

On December 22, Doumit agreed to a three-year contract with the Pirates to avoid arbitration.

Doumit began the 2009 year strongly, starting 11 of the first 12 games and hitting .244 with 2 home runs; however, he sustained a wrist injury in a game against the Atlanta Braves, later diagnosed as a fracture in the scaphoid bone. Doumit had surgery to repair the bone, and missed roughly 8–10 weeks. He finished 2009 with 16 doubles, no triples, 10 home runs, 38 runs batted in, 4 stolen bases, to go along with a .250 average, .299 on-base percentage, a .414 slugging percentage, in 280 at bats.

Doumit played in 124 games during the 2010 season with the Pirates. He batted .251 with 13 home runs and 51 runs batted in. His season ended due to injury.

For the 2011 season, Doumit was limited to just 77 games, in which he batted .303 with 10 home runs and 38 runs batted in. He became a free agent after the 2011 season, ending his tenure with the Pirates.

=== Minnesota Twins ===
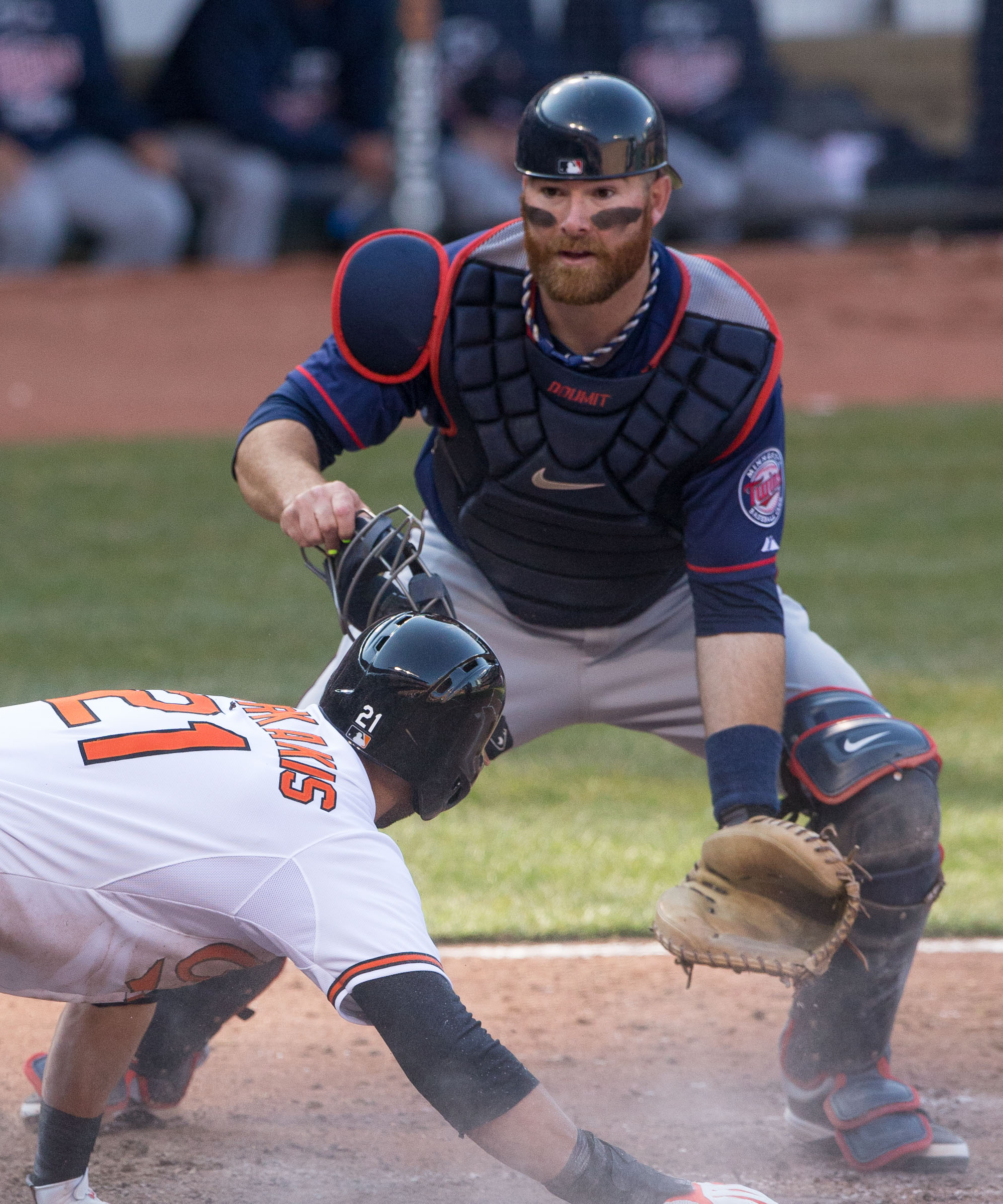
Doumit playing for the Minnesota Twins in 2013

On November 18, 2011, Doumit agreed to a one-year, $3 million deal with the Minnesota Twins.

On June 29, 2012, the Twins signed Doumit to a two-year extension through the 2014 season. The extension was worth $7 million, with $3.5 million per year in 2013 and 2014.

=== Atlanta Braves ===
On December 18, 2013, Doumit was traded to the Atlanta Braves for minor league pitcher Sean Gilmartin. He became a free agent following the season.
