= 2007 St. Louis Cardinals season =

Major League Baseball season

2007 St. Louis Cardinals
- League: National League
- Division: Central
- Ballpark: Busch Stadium
- City: St. Louis, Missouri
- Record: 78–84 (.481)
- Divisional place: 3rd
- Owners: William DeWitt Jr., Fred Hanser
- General managers: Walt Jocketty
- Managers: Tony La Russa
- Television: FSN Midwest (Dan McLaughlin, Al Hrabosky, Joe Buck); KSDK (Jay Randolph, Ricky Horton, Mike Shannon)
- Radio: KTRS (Mike Shannon, John Rooney, Rick Horton-KSDK Games Only)

The 2007 St. Louis Cardinals season was the 126th season for the St. Louis Cardinals, a Major League Baseball franchise in St. Louis, Missouri. It was the 116th season for the Cardinals in the National League and their 2nd at Busch Stadium III.

The season started with the team trying to defend their 2006 World Series championship. During the offseason, the Cardinals were faced with the challenge of handling their starting rotation. Four of their five starters were free agents, including Jeff Suppan (the 2006 NLCS MVP), Jeff Weaver (the winning pitcher in the World Series Game 5 clincher), Mark Mulder, and Jason Marquis. In the end, Suppan, Weaver, and Marquis all signed with other teams. The Cardinals signed Mulder, who ended the 2006 season on the disabled list, to a new two-year contract, but Mulder remained on the disabled list after undergoing shoulder surgery.

To replace the departed pitchers, the Cardinals promoted Adam Wainwright, who spent 2006 in relief and took the closer's job from injured Jason Isringhausen, to the rotation. They signed free agent pitcher Kip Wells to fill another spot. The team entered 2007 with a rotation of Chris Carpenter, Wells, Wainwright and Anthony Reyes, with reliever Braden Looper assuming the fifth starter's role until Mulder's return.

In contrast with the rotation, the rest of the team remained stable. Every member of the Cardinals' playoff bullpen remained under contract for 2007, though the Cardinals signed free agent relievers Ryan Franklin and Russ Springer for reinforcement and middle reliever Josh Kinney suffered an injury in spring training that required Tommy John surgery and forced him to miss the entire 2007 season. Every position player for the Cardinals returned in 2007 except for midseason acquisition Ronnie Belliard, who signed as a free agent with the Washington Nationals. To replace Belliard, the Cardinals signed Adam Kennedy, a former Cardinal who was traded to the then-Anaheim Angels for Jim Edmonds in 2000, and was teammates with current Cardinals David Eckstein and Scott Spiezio when they won the 2002 World Series with Anaheim.

In spring training, the Birds were 16–10–3 with a team batting average of .255 and a 2.29 team ERA. Attendance at Roger Dean Stadium was 102,619. This was the Cardinals last losing season, until 2023.

== Regular season ==
=== April: The death of Josh Hancock ===
The Cardinals began the season by raising their championship banner for winning the 2006 World Series. They played the first game of the 2007 season in a rematch of the 2006 NLCS as they hosted the Mets for a three-game series. The homestand ended with disappointment, however, as the Mets swept the Cardinals, outscoring them 20–2. Later in April the Cardinals suffered a major setback when ace pitcher Chris Carpenter was placed on the disabled list due to arthritis and impingement. The team struggled for most of the month of April, getting off to a 10–14 start.

At approximately 12:35 am CST on April 29, 2007, pitcher Josh Hancock died in a car accident in St. Louis. Hancock, a 29-year-old reliever who threw 77 innings for the Cardinals during the 2006 season, collided with a tow truck stopped on Interstate 64 to assist another motorist. The Cardinals' game against the Cubs scheduled for later that day was postponed due to the accident. Autopsy reports showed that Hancock was intoxicated with a blood alcohol level almost twice the legal limit in Missouri. In response the Cardinals banned alcohol from the team's clubhouse. The tragedy brought back memories of the loss of former Cardinal pitcher Darryl Kile, who died of coronary disease in 2002. Hancock became the second MLB player in the previous 25 years to die during the regular season. After Hancock's death, the Cardinals began wearing a black patch reading "32" on their uniforms in his memory.

=== May ===
The team's offensive struggles grew worse with the start of the new month. St. Louis went two weeks without hitting a home run; Chris Duncan hit one in a loss to the Brewers on May 1 and again in a May 15 victory over the Dodgers. On May 13, they were shut out for the sixth time in their first 35 games in a 3–0 loss to the Padres. A series in Detroit featuring a rematch of the teams from the 2006 World Series ended in a three-game Tiger sweep and dropped the Cardinals' record to 16–25 for the season. Anthony Reyes was sent down to the minors on May 27 after compiling an 0–8 record and 6.08 ERA. Catcher Yadier Molina was placed on the disabled list on May 30 with a fractured wrist suffered from a foul tip that struck his hand while catching. The team ended May with a 22–29 record.

=== June ===
Kip Wells' terrible season continued on June 2, becoming the majors' first 10-game loser, and the first Cardinals pitcher in 16 years to lose ten games before the All-Star break. Wells went to the bullpen shortly thereafter. Looper went on the DL on June 18, after struggling following a hot start to the season. Kennedy lost the starting second base job to Aaron Miles. The Cardinals, whose starting rotation had fallen to dead last in the NL in ERA, acquired Mike Maroth from the Detroit Tigers for a player to be named later. Injuries continued to plague the team as Eckstein, Johnson and Edmonds went on the disabled list. Anthony Reyes, recalled from the minors, dropped to 0–10 after a loss to the Mets on June 28. New acquisition Troy Percival, a veteran relief pitcher who had been retired at the start of the season but signed a minor-league deal with St. Louis, earned a victory in his first big-league appearance in two years on June 29 against Cincinnati. (Percival became the fourth member of the 2002 World Champion Angels to play on the Cardinals, joining Kennedy, Spiezio and Eckstein, and the fifth ex-Angel overall, also including Edmonds).

Despite the injuries and the turnover in the pitching staff, the Cardinals played better in June, going 13–13 for the month after losing records in April and May. However, they were still well behind the Brewers. On June 30 they fell 10.5 games behind Milwaukee, the furthest out of first place they were all season.

=== July ===
Anthony Reyes was sent down to the minor leagues again on July 2. St. Louis entered the All-Star Break with a 40–45 record, in third place in the division, 7½ games behind Milwaukee. Albert Pujols was the only Cardinal on the NL All-Star roster. St. Louis participated in another franchise's milestone when their 10–2 defeat of Philadelphia on July 15 made the Phillies the first team in MLB history to lose 10,000 games.

The Cardinals could not find consistency for most of July, never losing or winning more than two games in a row until the end of the month. The team suffered a devastating setback when Carpenter, who had been on track to return sometime in late July, was diagnosed with ligament damage and had season-ending Tommy John surgery. Jim Edmonds returned to the team after spending over a month on the disabled list. New pitcher Mike Maroth struggled terribly in July, posting an 11.86 ERA for the month. However, Anthony Reyes, called up to the big leagues again, got his first win of the year on July 28 after an 0–10 start.

In yet another attempt to bolster their faltering rotation, on July 31 St. Louis acquired Joel Piñeiro from the Red Sox for cash and a player to be named later. The Cardinals had their first winning month of the year in July, going 15–11. After spending most of the month far behind Milwaukee, St. Louis took three of four from the Brewers at the end of July to close the gap to six games.

=== August ===
The momentum built by the four-game win streak at the end of July was promptly dissipated as the Cardinals lost five in a row to Pittsburgh and Washington. Manager Tony La Russa, in an effort to increase offensive production, on August 4 began batting Cardinal pitchers eighth in the lineup. LaRussa as justification cited 1998, when he batted the pitcher eighth for the whole second half of the season and a team that was four games under .500 before the change played ten games over .500 after. LaRussa's revised lineup marked the first time that any team had hit its starting pitcher anywhere other than the ninth spot in the lineup since the Florida Marlins moved Dontrelle Willis up in the batting order for a few games in 2005.

The Cardinals snapped their losing streak on August 6, beating San Diego 10–5. St. Louis scored ten runs on ten consecutive hits in the fifth inning, becoming the 12th team in MLB history to get ten base hits in a row. Three days later, Scott Spiezio, the Cardinals' utilityman and third base backup, was placed on the restricted list due to unspecified substance abuse problems. LaRussa told reporters that "What we want more than anything else is to do whatever is best for him." Spiezio's replacement was both a surprise and a familiar face: Rick Ankiel. Ankiel, once a promising young pitcher for the Cardinals—striking out 194 batters in 175 innings in 2000 at the age of twenty—suffered a catastrophic attack of wildness in the 2000 postseason, throwing nine wild pitches and walking eleven batters in only four postseason innings. Further wildness sent him back to the minors in 2001, and after four years struggling to overcome his wildness and subsequent injuries, Ankiel quit pitching in 2005 and announced he would try to make it back to the big leagues as a hitter. After hitting 31 home runs in 2007 for the Memphis Redbirds (St. Louis's AAA affiliate), Ankiel was called up to the big leagues to fill Spiezio's roster spot. In his first game back, Ankiel hit a three-run homer and the Cardinals won 5–0.

The return of Rick Ankiel to the lineup coincided with the best stretch of play by the Cardinals in 2007. St. Louis won five in a row and eight out of ten against L.A., San Diego and Milwaukee, advancing to two games under .500 and 2½ games behind the Brewers. Continued strong starting pitching and hot hitting from Pujols, rookie infielder Brendan Ryan, and others propelled the Cardinals to the .500 mark on August 28, the first time since they were 6–6 on April 16 that they did not have a losing record.

Scott Rolen was forced out of the lineup due to tightness and pain in his surgically repaired shoulder. Rolen decided to have season-ending shoulder surgery shortly after. Brendan Ryan was named the starting third baseman in Rolen's place and the Cardinals traded for backup infielder Russell Branyan right before the August trade deadline. St. Louis went 15–13 in August and finished the month 65–66 and in third place in the division, two games behind the Cubs and one-half game behind Milwaukee. The Cardinals' 8–5 victory over Cincinnati on the last day of the month gave Tony La Russa victory #1,042 as the Cardinal manager, passing Red Schoendienst to become the winningest Cardinal manager of all time. In the same game, Cardinal right fielder Juan Encarnación was struck in the eye and severely injured with a foul ball. Encarnacion was diagnosed with severe injuries to his left eye and multiple fractures of the orbital bone. The injury ended his season and is believed to be potentially career-threatening.

The last off-day for the team in 2007 came on August 27, when they had four games remaining in the month, and then 31 games in September. This set a new major-league baseball record for a team with the longest number of consecutive days played (35) at the end of the season without a day off.

=== September ===
The Cardinals entered September facing a stretch run of 31 games in 30 days, due to all three off-days in the month being taken up by makeups of earlier postponements. Former Cardinal Miguel Cairo, recently signed by St. Louis after he was waived by the Yankees, was brought up to the big club as the first of the September callups.

On September 2, the Cardinals completed a three-game sweep of Cincinnati that put them at 67–66, the first time they were over .500 since they were 6–5 after the April 15 game. They entered the game on September 7 against the Arizona Diamondbacks with a chance to take sole possession of first place, but instead the D-backs won and went on to sweep the weekend series. September 7 was also the day that the New York Daily News reported that Rick Ankiel received a year's worth of human growth hormone in 2004 while he was trying to come back as a pitcher. HGH was legal at that time but has since been banned by MLB. In response Ankiel said that he had a valid prescription and that all of his medications were taken under a doctor's care.

The sweep in Arizona began a devastating slump that took the Cardinals out of contention in the NL Central. They lost nine in a row to Arizona, Chicago, Cincinnati, and Chicago again. The ninth loss came to the Cubs in the first game of a doubleheader on September 15, the game rescheduled from April 29 after the death of Josh Hancock. It was the longest losing streak for the franchise since the 1980 Cardinals lost ten in a row. The Cardinals were officially eliminated on September 21, as they lost to the visiting Houston Astros at Busch Stadium. After being eliminated from postseason, St. Louis played out the string by going 7–2 the rest of the way, and finished the season with a 78–84 record, finishing in third place, seven games behind the NL Central winning Chicago Cubs. It was the first losing season for the franchise since the 1999 Cardinals went 75–86, and would be their last losing season until 2023 when they then finished 71-91.

On September 22, 2007, hosting the Houston Astros, the Cardinals set a one-day attendance record in their new Busch Stadium with 46,237.

In 2007, the Cardinals drew an all-time attendance record for any year with 3,552,180 in their 81 home games (breaking their previous record set in 2005), an average of 43,854 per game.

== Aftermath ==
Owner William DeWitt Jr. fired Walt Jocketty, General Manager for the Cardinals since 1995, on October 3. Assistant GM John Mozeliak replaced Jocketty in an interim capacity before being named the new GM on October 31, 2007.

On October 22, Manager Tony La Russa, after considering moving elsewhere when his contract expired, signed a new two-year deal guaranteeing his record 13th and 14th seasons as Cardinal manager, the longest tenure in franchise history.

No Cardinal won a Gold Glove. Perhaps the most surprising denial was to catcher Yadier Molina, who was denied the award despite his .991 fielding percentage. Both Molina and Albert Pujols previously (November 1) won the prestigious Fielding Bible Award, which is given to only one person at each position in the major leagues.

=== Season standings ===
==== National League Central ====
NL Central
Team	W	L	Pct.	GB	Home	Road
Chicago Cubs	85	77	.525	—	44‍–‍37	41‍–‍40
Milwaukee Brewers	83	79	.512	2	51‍–‍30	32‍–‍49
St. Louis Cardinals	78	84	.481	7	43‍–‍38	35‍–‍46
Houston Astros	73	89	.451	12	42‍–‍39	31‍–‍50
Cincinnati Reds	72	90	.444	13	39‍–‍42	33‍–‍48
Pittsburgh Pirates	68	94	.420	17	37‍–‍44	31‍–‍50

==== Record vs. opponents ====
2007 National League record Source: MLB Standings Grid – 2007
Team	AZ	ATL	CHC	CIN	COL	FLA	HOU	LAD	MIL	NYM	PHI	PIT	SD	SF	STL	WAS	AL
Arizona	—	4–2	4–2	2–4	8–10	6–1	5–2	8–10	2–5	3–4	5–1	5–4	10–8	10–8	4–3	6–1	8–7
Atlanta	2–4	—	5–4	1–6	4–2	10–8	3–3	4–3	5–2	9–9	9–9	5–1	5–2	4–3	3–4	11–7	4–11
Chicago	2–4	4–5	—	9–9	5–2	0–6	8–7	2–5	9–6	2–5	3–4	8–7	3–5	5–2	11–5	6–1	8–4
Cincinnati	4–2	6–1	9–9	—	2–4	4–3	4–11	2–4	8–7	2–5	2–4	9–7	2–4	4–3	6–9	1–6	7-11
Colorado	10–8	2–4	2–5	4–2	—	3–3	3–4	12–6	4–2	4–2	4–3	4–3	11–8	10–8	3–4	4–3	10–8
Florida	1–6	8–10	6–0	3–4	3–3	—	2–3	4–3	2–5	7–11	9–9	3–4	3–4	1–6	2–4	8–10	9–9
Houston	2–5	3–3	7–8	11–4	4–3	3-2	—	4–3	5–13	2–5	3–3	5–10	4–3	2–4	7–9	2–5	9–9
Los Angeles	10–8	3–4	5–2	4–2	6–12	3–4	3–4	—	3–3	5–5	4–2	5–2	8–10	10–8	3–3	5–1	5–10
Milwaukee	5–2	2–5	6–9	7–8	2–4	5–2	13–5	3–3	—	2–4	3–4	10–6	2–5	4–5	7–8	4–2	8–7
New York	4–3	9–9	5–2	5–2	2–4	11–7	5–2	5–5	4–2	—	6–12	4–2	2–4	4–2	5–2	9–9	8–7
Philadelphia	1-5	9–9	4–3	4–2	3–4	9–9	3–3	2–4	4–3	12–6	—	4–2	4–3	4–4	6–3	12–6	8–7
Pittsburgh	4–5	1–5	7–8	7–9	3–4	4–3	10–5	2–5	6–10	2–4	2–4	—	1–6	4–2	6–12	4–2	5–10
San Diego	8–10	2–5	5–3	4–2	8–11	4–3	3–4	10–8	5–2	4–2	3–4	6–1	—	14–4	3–4	4–2	6–9
San Francisco	8–10	3–4	2–5	3–4	8–10	6–1	4–2	8–10	5–4	2–4	4–4	2–4	4–14	—	4–1	3–4	5–10
St. Louis	3–4	4–3	5–11	9–6	4–3	4-2	9–7	3–3	8–7	2–5	3–6	12–6	4–3	1–4	—	1–5	6–9
Washington	1–6	7–11	1–6	6–1	3–4	10-8	5–2	1–5	2–4	9–9	6–12	2–4	2–4	4–3	5–1	—	9–9

=== Roster ===
2007 St. Louis Cardinals
Roster
Pitchers: 29 Chris Carpenter; 61 Troy Cate; 63 Andy Cavazos; 59 Dennis Dove; 60 Brian Falkenborg; 34 Randy Flores; 31 Ryan Franklin; 32 Josh Hancock; 44 Jason Isringhausen; 56 Kelvin Jiménez; 19 Tyler Johnson; 54 Randy Keisler; 41 Braden Looper; 46 Mike Maroth; 30 Mark Mulder; 40 Troy Percival; 35 Joel Piñeiro; 23 Anthony Reyes; 36 Russ Springer; 48 Brad Thompson; 50 Adam Wainwright; 37 Todd Wellemeyer; 21 Kip Wells	Catchers: 28 Gary Bennett; 35 Brian Esposito; 4 Yadier Molina; 54 Kelly Stinnett; Infielders: 62 Brian Barden; 33 Russell Branyan; 3 Miguel Cairo; 22 David Eckstein; 7 Adam Kennedy; 12 Aaron Miles; 5 Albert Pujols; 27 Scott Rolen; 13 Brendan Ryan; 26 Scott Spiezio	Outfielders: 24 Rick Ankiel; 16 Chris Duncan; 15 Jim Edmonds; 43 Juan Encarnación; 47,63 Ryan Ludwick; 55 Skip Schumaker; 99 So Taguchi; 3 Preston Wilson	Manager: 10 Tony La Russa; Coaches: 18 Dave Duncan (pitching); 38 Marty Mason (bullpen); 39 Dave McKay (first base); 8 Hal McRae (hitting); 11 José Oquendo (third base); 24 Joe Pettini (bench)

== Game log ==
2007 game log
April

#	Date	Opponent	Score	Win	Loss	Save	Attendance	Record
1	April 1	Mets	6 – 1	Glavine (1-0)	Carpenter (0-1)		45,429	0-1
2	April 3	Mets	4 – 1	Hernández (1-0)	Wells (0-1)	Wagner (1)	45,440	0-2
3	April 4	Mets	10 – 0	Maine (1-0)	Looper (0-1)		45,423	0-3
4	April 6	@ Astros	4 – 2	Wainwright (1-0)	Rodríguez (0-1)	Isringhausen (1)	43,430	1-3
5	April 7	@ Astros	5 – 1	Oswalt (1-0)	Reyes (0-1)		41,885	1-4
6	April 8	@ Astros	10 – 1	Wells (1-1)	Jennings (0-1)		36,273	2-4
7	April 9	@ Pirates	3 – 0	Looper (1-1)	Snell (0-1)	Isringhausen (2)	38,429	3-4
8	April 10	@ Pirates	3 – 2 (12)	Thompson (1-0)	Wasdin (0-1)	Isringhausen (3)	12,468	4-4
9	April 11	@ Pirates	3 – 2	Franklin (1-0)	Torres (0-1)		9,959	5-4
--	April 13	Brewers	Postponed (rain), Rescheduled for July 28					5-4
10	April 14	Brewers	3 – 2	Suppan (1-1)	Wells (1-2)	Cordero (4)	42,805	5-5
11	April 15	Brewers	10 – 2	Looper (2-1)	Sheets (1-1)		44,153	6-5
12	April 16	Pirates	3 – 2	Snell (1-1)	Reyes (0-2)	Torres (5)	43,026	6-6
13	April 17	Pirates	6 – 1	Gorzelanny (2-0)	Wainwright (1-1)		42,446	6-7
14	April 18	@ Giants	6 – 5 (12)	Sánchez (1-0)	Hancock (0-1)		40,532	6-8
15	April 19	@ Giants	6 – 2	Lowry (1-2)	Wells (1-3)	Hennessey (1)	37,398	6-9
16	April 20	@ Cubs	2 – 1	Looper (3-1)	Lilly (1-2)	Isringhausen (4)	38,955	7-9
17	April 21	@ Cubs	6 – 0	Marquis (2-1)	Reyes (0-3)		41,637	7-10
18	April 22	@ Cubs	12 – 9 (10)	Isringhausen (1-0)	Dempster (0-1)		40,193	8-10
19	April 24	Reds	10 – 3	Harang (3-0)	Wells (1-4)		42,309	8-11
20	April 25	Reds	5 – 2	Flores (1-0)	Saarloos (0-2)	Isringhausen (5)	42,225	9-11
21	April 26	Reds	7 – 5	Springer (1-0)	Lohse (1-1)	Isringhausen (6)	42,503	10-11
22	April 27	Cubs	5 – 3	Marquis (3-1)	Reyes (0-4)	Dempster (4)	45,131	10-12
23	April 28	Cubs	8 – 1	Zambrano (2-2)	Wainwright (1-2)		45,015	10-13
--	April 29	Cubs	Postponed (death of Cardinals pitcher Josh Hancock), Rescheduled for September 15					10-13
24	April 30	@ Brewers	7 – 1	Suppan (4-1)	Wells (1-5)		20,191	10-14

May

#	Date	Opponent	Score	Win	Loss	Save	Attendance	Record
25	May 1	@ Brewers	12 – 2	Sheets (2-2)	Looper (3-2)		20,446	10-15
26	May 2	@ Brewers	4 – 0	Villanueva (2-0)	Reyes (0-5)		23,299	10-16
27	May 4	Astros	3 – 2	Wainwright (2-2)	Williams (0-5)	Isringhausen (7)	44,117	11-16
28	May 5	Astros	13 – 0	Albers (1-1)	Wells (1-6)		44,881	11-17
29	May 6	Astros	3 – 1	Looper (4-2)	Sampson (3-2)	Isringhausen (8)	44,453	12-17
30	May 7	Rockies	3 – 2	McClellan (1-0)	Falkenborg (0-1)	Fuentes (8)	42,285	12-18
31	May 8	Rockies	4 – 1	Jiménez (1-0)	Bautista (2-1)	Isringhausen (9)	42,763	13-18
32	May 9	Rockies	9 – 2	Wainwright (3-2)	Hirsh (2-3)		43,001	14-18
33	May 11	@ Padres	7 – 0	Peavy (5-1)	Wells (1-7)		38,901	14-19
34	May 12	@ Padres	5 – 0	Looper (5-2)	Young (4-3)		44,082	15-19
35	May 13	@ Padres	3 – 0	Germano (1-0)	Reyes (0-6)	Hoffman (10)	36,616	15-20
36	May 14	@ Dodgers	8 – 4	Thompson (2-0)	Tomko (1-4)	Isringhausen (10)	35,707	16-20
37	May 15	@ Dodgers	9 – 7	Lowe (4-4)	Wainwright (3-3)	Saito (12)	38,954	16-21
38	May 16	@ Dodgers	5 – 4	Wolf (5-3)	Wells (1-8)	Saito (13)	38,252	16-22
39	May 18	@ Tigers	14 – 4	Miller (1-0)	Looper (5-3)		40,816	16-23
40	May 19	@ Tigers	8 – 7	Robertson (4-3)	Reyes (0-7)	Jones (14)	42,625	16-24
41	May 20	@ Tigers	6 – 3	Verlander (4-1)	Thompson (2-1)	Seay (1)	39,562	16-25
42	May 22	Pirates	9 – 4	Wainwright (4-3)	Duke (1-5)		42,679	17-25
43	May 23	Pirates	5 – 3	Wells (2-8)	Snell (4-3)	Isringhausen (11)	42,245	18-25
44	May 24	Pirates	3 – 1	Looper (6-3)	Gorzelanny (5-3)	Isringhausen (12)	44,296	19-25
45	May 25	Nationals	5 – 4	Bowie (1-2)	Reyes (0-8)	Cordero (7)	43,618	19-26
46	May 26	Nationals	8 – 6	Thompson (3-1)	Speigner (1-1)	Isringhausen (13)	44,270	20-26
47	May 27	Nationals	7 – 2	Rivera (1-1)	Wainwright (4-4)		44,578	20-27
48	May 28	@ Rockies	6 – 2	Francis (4-4)	Wells (2-9)		31,575	20-28
49	May 29	@ Rockies	8 – 3	López (2-0)	Looper (6-4)		18,213	20-29
50	May 30	@ Rockies	8 – 4	Wellemeyer (1-0)	Hirsh (2-5)		19,062	21-29
51	May 31	@ Rockies	7 – 3	Thompson (4-1)	Cook (4-2)		19,097	22-29

June

#	Date	Opponent	Score	Win	Loss	Save	Attendance	Record
52	June 1	@ Astros	8 – 1	Franklin (2-0)	Qualls (4-3)		36,784	23-29
53	June 2	@ Astros	8 – 3	Sampson (5-5)	Wells (2-10)		39,234	23-30
54	June 3	@ Astros	8 – 6 (10)	Isringhausen (2-0)	Wheeler (0-2)		40,483	24-30
55	June 5	Reds	4 – 3	Isringhausen (3-0)	Burton (0-1)		43,532	25-30
56	June 6	Reds	6 – 4	Johnson (1-0)	Arroyo (2-7)	Isringhausen (14)	42,029	26-30
57	June 7	Reds	5 – 1	Lohse (3-7)	Wainwright (4-5)		43,597	26-31
58	June 8	Angels	10 – 6	Carrasco (1-1)	Johnson (1-1)		44,156	26-32
59	June 9	Angels	9 – 3	Santana (5-6)	Looper (6-5)		45,392	26-33
60	June 10	Angels	9 – 6	Wellemeyer (2-1)	Bootcheck (1-1)		43,612	27-33
61	June 12	@ Royals	8 – 1	Bannister (3-3)	Thompson (4-2)		29,354	27-34
62	June 13	@ Royals	7 – 3	Wainwright (5-5)	Pérez (3-7)		25,555	28-34
63	June 14	@ Royals	17 – 8	Greinke (4-4)	Wells (2-11)		28,837	28-35
64	June 15	@ Athletics	14 – 3	Haren (8-2)	Looper (6-6)		24,241	28-36
65	June 16	@ Athletics	15 – 6	Springer (2-0)	DiNardo (2-3)		28,572	29-36
66	June 17	@ Athletics	10 – 6	Springer (3-0)	Lewis (0-2)		35,077	30-36
67	June 18	Royals	5 – 3	Pérez (4-7)	Wainwright (5-6)	Dotel (6)	43,524	30-37
68	June 19	Royals	5 – 1	Thompson (5-2)	Elarton (2-3)		42,712	31-37
69	June 20	Royals	7 – 6 (14)	Wells (3-11)	de la Rosa (4-8)		42,623	32-37
70	June 22	Phillies	6 – 0	Moyer (7-5)	Reyes (0-9)		45,360	32-38
71	June 23	Phillies	8 – 3	Wainwright (6-6)	Eaton (7-5)		45,336	33-38
72	June 24	Phillies	5 – 1	Sanches (1-0)	Thompson (5-3)		44,899	33-39
73	June 25	@ Mets	2 – 1 (11)	Heilman (6-3)	Springer (3-1)		40,075	33-40
74	June 26	@ Mets	5 – 3 (11)	Thompson (6-3)	Schoeneweis (0-2)	Flores (1)	40,053	34-40
75	June 27	@ Mets	2 – 0 (6)	Glavine (7-5)	Reyes (0-10)		40,948	34-41
--	June 28	@ Mets	Postponed (rain), Rescheduled for September 27					34-41
76	June 29	@ Reds	4 – 2	Percival (1-0)	McBeth (2-2)	Isringhausen (15)	35,508	35-41
77	June 30	@ Reds	5 – 1	Lohse (4-10)	Wainwright (6-7)		32,538	35-42

July

#	Date	Opponent	Score	Win	Loss	Save	Attendance	Record
78	July 1	@ Reds	11 – 7	Percival (2-0)	Bailey (2-2)		24,126	36-42
79	July 2	D-backs	11 – 3	Springer (4-1)	Webb (8-6)		42,312	37-42
80	July 3	D-backs	7 – 1	Petit (1-1)	Wellemeyer (2-2)		42,127	37-43
81	July 4	D-backs	5 – 4	Franklin (3-0)	Lyon (5-3)	Isringhausen (16)	43,538	38-43
82	July 5	D-backs	3 – 2	Wainwright (7-7)	Davis (5-10)	Isringhausen (17)	42,184	39-43
83	July 6	Giants	4 – 3	Lowry (9-6)	Maroth (5-3)	Messenger (1)	45,245	39-44
84	July 7	Giants	7 – 6	Lincecum (4-2)	Looper (6-7)	Hennessey (5)	45,355	39-45
85	July 8	Giants	7 – 0	Wellemeyer (3-2)	Zito (6-9)		44,613	40-45
86	July 13	@ Phillies	13 – 3	Kendrick (4-0)	Wells (3-12)		43,838	40-46
87	July 14	@ Phillies	10 – 4	Hamels (11-4)	Maroth (5-4)		45,050	40-47
88	July 15	@ Phillies	10 – 2	Wainwright (8-7)	Eaton (8-6)		44,872	41-47
89	July 16	@ Marlins	5 – 3	Looper (7-7)	Kim (4-5)	Isringhausen (18)	13,827	42-47
90	July 17	@ Marlins	4 – 0	VandenHurk (3-2)	Thompson (6-4)		12,475	42-48
91	July 18	@ Marlins	6 – 0	Wells (4-12)	Willis (7-9)		12,819	43-48
92	July 19	@ Braves	10 – 1	Hudson (10-5)	Maroth (5-5)		41,171	43-49
93	July 20	@ Braves	4 – 2	Wainwright (9-7)	Soriano (2-2)	Isringhausen (19)	42,712	44-49
94	July 21	@ Braves	14 – 6	Carlyle (5-2)	Looper (7-8)		53,953	44-50
95	July 22	@ Braves	7 – 2 (10)	Isringhausen (4-0)	Yates (2-2)		39,181	45-50
96	July 24	Cubs	4 – 3	Zambrano (13-7)	Wells (4-13)	Dempster (17)	45,436	45-51
97	July 25	Cubs	7 – 1	Lilly (11-4)	Wainwright (9-8)		45,316	45-52
98	July 26	Cubs	11 – 1	Looper (8-8)	Marquis (7-6)		45,308	46-52
99	July 27	Brewers	12 – 2	Vargas (9-2)	Maroth (5-6)		45,137	46-53
100	July 28	Brewers	7 – 6	Springer (5-1)	Cordero (0-4)		45,089	47-53
101	July 28	Brewers	5 – 2	Reyes (1-10)	Capuano (5-7)	Isringhausen (20)	45,829	48-53
102	July 29	Brewers	9 – 5	Franklin (4-0)	Turnbow (2-4)		44,854	49-53
103	July 31	@ Pirates	6 – 4	Wainwright (10-8)	Maholm (7-13)	Isringhausen (21)	24,085	50-53

August

#	Date	Opponent	Score	Win	Loss	Save	Attendance	Record
104	August 1	@ Pirates	15 – 1	Armas (1-3)	Looper (8-9)		17,041	50-54
105	August 2	@ Pirates	5 – 4 (11)	Torres (1-3)	Thompson (6-5)		19,132	50-55
106	August 3	@ Nationals	3 – 2	Cordero (2-2)	Franklin (4-1)		27,992	50-56
107	August 4	@ Nationals	12 – 1	Hanrahan (1-0)	Piñeiro (1-2)		29,252	50-57
108	August 5	@ Nationals	6 – 3	King (1-0)	Franklin (4-2)	Cordero (23)	33,517	50-58
109	August 6	Padres	10 – 5	Looper (9-9)	Wells (5-8)		42,743	51-58
110	August 7	Padres	4 – 0	Peavy (12-5)	Reyes (1-11)		42,846	51-59
111	August 8	Padres	2 – 1	Wells (5-13)	Maddux (7-9)	Isringhausen (22)	42,138	52-59
112	August 9	Padres	5 – 0	Piñeiro (2-2)	Young (9-4)		42,848	53-59
113	August 10	Dodgers	2 – 1	Beimel (3-1)	Wainwright (10-9)	Saito (29)	44,595	53-60
114	August 11	Dodgers	6 – 1	Looper (10-9)	Lowe (8-11)		44,260	54-60
115	August 12	Dodgers	12 – 2	Reyes (2-11)	Hendrickson (4-7)		45,379	55-60
116	August 14	@ Brewers	12 – 4	Wells (6-13)	Capuano (5-10)		37,518	56-60
117	August 15	@ Brewers	8 – 3	Piñeiro (3-2)	Gallardo (4-3)		33,404	57-60
118	August 16	@ Brewers	8 – 0	Wainwright (11-9)	Bush (9-9)		36,062	58-60
119	August 17	@ Cubs	2 – 1	Hill (7-7)	Looper (10-10)	Dempster (18)	41,634	58-61
120	August 18	@ Cubs	5 – 3	Marshall (6-6)	Reyes (2-12)	Dempster (19)	41,369	58-62
--	August 19	@ Cubs	Postponed (rain), Rescheduled for September 10					58-62
121	August 20	@ Cubs	6 – 4	Piñeiro (4-2)	Lilly (13-6)	Isringhausen (23)	40,141	59-62
122	August 21	Marlins	5 – 2	Percival (3-0)	Benítez (2-8)	Isringhausen (24)	42,059	60-62
123	August 22	Marlins	6 – 4	Springer (6-1)	Olsen (9-11)	Isringhausen (25)	42,147	61-62
124	August 23	Marlins	11 – 3	VandenHurk (4-4)	Reyes (2-13)		42,123	61-63
125	August 24	Braves	7 – 2	Smoltz (12-6)	Wells (6-14)		44,032	61-64
126	August 25	Braves	5 – 4	Springer (7-1)	Hudson (15-6)	Isringhausen (26)	45,441	62-64
127	August 26	Braves	4 – 1	Wainwright (12-9)	Reyes (0-2)	Isringhausen (27)	43,934	63-64
128	August 28	@ Astros	7 – 0	Looper (11-10)	Williams (8-13)		37,915	64-64
129	August 29	@ Astros	7 – 0	Oswalt (14-6)	Wells (6-15)		33,422	64-65
130	August 30	@ Astros	2 – 1	Albers (4-6)	Piñeiro (4-3)	Lidge (14)	37,520	64-66
131	August 31	Reds	8 – 5	Flores (2-0)	Majewski (0-2)		43,564	65-66

September

#	Date	Opponent	Score	Win	Loss	Save	Attendance	Record
132	September 1	Reds	11 – 3	Wainwright (13-9)	Dumatrait (0-3)		42,356	66-66
133	September 2	Reds	3 – 2	Looper (12-10)	Arroyo (7-14)	Isringhausen (28)	44,223	67-66
134	September 3	Pirates	11 – 0	Snell (9-11)	Wells (6-16)		42,238	67-67
135	September 4	Pirates	6 – 2	Piñeiro (5-3)	Morris (8-9)	Franklin (1)	42,300	68-67
136	September 5	Pirates	8 – 2	Armas (3-5)	Mulder (0-1)		42,299	68-68
137	September 6	Pirates	16 – 4 (8)	Jiménez (2-0)	Bullington (0-1)		42,330	69-68
138	September 7	@ D-backs	4 – 2	Webb (15-10)	Wainwright (13-10)	Valverde (43)	31,225	69-69
139	September 8	@ D-backs	9 – 8	Eveland (1-0)	Wellemeyer (3-3)	Valverde (44)	45,931	69-70
140	September 9	@ D-backs	6 – 5	Petit (3-4)	Franklin (4-3)	Valverde (45)	35,136	69-71
141	September 10	@ Cubs	12 – 3	Lilly (15-7)	Piñeiro (5-4)		40,358	69-72
142	September 11	@ Reds	7 – 2	Belisle (8-8)	Mulder (0-2)		14,027	69-73
143	September 12	@ Reds	5 – 1	Arroyo (9-14)	Reyes (2-14)		16,167	69-74
144	September 13	@ Reds	5 – 4	Harang (15-4)	Wells (6-17)	Weathers (30)	18,018	69-75
145	September 14	Cubs	5 – 3	Zambrano (16-12)	Wainwright (13-11)	Howry (8)	45,750	69-76
146	September 15	Cubs	3 – 2	Wood (1-1)	Franklin (4-4)	Dempster (27)	45,918	69-77
147	September 15	Cubs	4 – 3	Piñeiro (6-4)	Marshall (7-8)	Isringhausen (29)	45,894	70-77
148	September 16	Cubs	4 – 2	Marquis (12-8)	Mulder (0-3)	Dempster (28)	45,735	70-78
149	September 17	Phillies	13 – 11	Kendrick (9-4)	Thompson (6-6)	Rosario (1)	42,031	70-79
150	September 18	Phillies	7 – 4 (14)	Mesa (2-3)	Maroth (5-7)	Condrey (1)	42,170	70-80
151	September 19	Phillies	2 – 1 (10)	Flores (3-0)	Myers (4-7)		44,337	71-80
152	September 20	Astros	18 – 1	Rodríguez (9-13)	Looper (12-11)		42,171	71-81
153	September 21	Astros	6 – 3	Backe (2-1)	Piñeiro (6-5)	Lidge (16)	43,677	71-82
154	September 22	Astros	7 – 4	Thompson (7-6)	Albers (4-10)	Isringhausen (30)	46,237	72-82
155	September 23	Astros	4 – 3	Jiménez (3-0)	Lidge (5-3)		46,169	73-82
156	September 24	@ Brewers	13 – 5	Bush (12-10)	Wainwright (13-12)		40,908	73-83
157	September 25	@ Brewers	9 – 1	Suppan (11-12)	Looper (12-12)		32,329	73-84
158	September 26	@ Brewers	7 – 3	Thompson (8-6)	Villanueva (8-5)		32,411	74-84
159	September 27	@ Mets	3 – 0	Piñeiro (7-5)	Martínez (3-1)	Isringhausen (31)	48,900	75-84
160	September 28	@ Pirates	6 – 1	Springer (8-1)	Grabow (3-2)		30,603	76-84
161	September 29	@ Pirates	7 – 3	Wainwright (14-12)	Gorzelanny (14-10)		35,169	77-84
162	September 30	@ Pirates	6 – 5	Wells (7-17)	Bullington (0-3)	Isringhausen (32)	25,664	78-84

== Player stats ==
=== Starting batters by position ===
Note: Pos = Position; G = Games played; AB = At bats; R = Runs; H = Hits; Avg. = Batting average; HR = Home runs; RBI = Runs batted in

Pos	Player	G	AB	R	H	Avg.	HR	RBI
C	Yadier Molina	111	353	30	97	.275	6	40
1B	Albert Pujols	158	565	99	185	.327	32	103
2B	Adam Kennedy	87	279	27	61	.219	3	18
SS	David Eckstein	117	434	58	134	.309	3	31
3B	Scott Rolen	112	392	55	104	.265	8	58
LF	Chris Duncan	127	375	51	97	.259	21	70
CF	Jim Edmonds	117	365	39	92	.252	12	53
RF	Juan Encarnación	78	283	43	80	.283	9	47

==== Other batters ====
Note: G = Games played; AB = At bats; R = Runs; H = Hits; Avg. = Batting average; HR = Home runs; RBI = Runs batted in

Player	G	AB	R	H	Avg.	HR	RBI
Aaron Miles	133	414	55	120	.290	2	32
So Taguchi	130	307	48	89	.290	3	30
Ryan Ludwick	120	303	42	81	.267	14	52
Scott Spiezio	81	223	31	60	.269	4	31
Brendan Ryan	67	180	30	52	.289	4	12
Skip Schumaker	88	177	19	59	.333	2	19
Rick Ankiel	47	172	31	49	.285	11	39
Gary Bennett	59	155	12	39	.252	2	17
Kelly Stinnett	26	82	7	13	.159	1	5
Miguel Cairo	28	67	8	17	.254	0	5
Preston Wilson	25	64	6	14	.219	1	5
Adam Wainwright	36	62	4	18	.290	1	6
Russell Branyan	21	32	4	6	.188	1	2
Brian Esposito	1	0	0	0	----	0	0

=== Starting and other pitchers ===
Note: GS = Games started; IP = Innings pitched; H = Hits allowed; W = Wins; L = Losses; ERA = Earned run average; BB = Walks allowed; SO = Strikeouts; WHIP= Walks+hits÷innings pitched; O-AVG = Opponents batting average

Player	GS	IP	H	W	L	ERA	BB	SO	WHIP	O-AVG	Run support
Adam Wainwright	32	202.0	212	14	12	3.70	70	136	1.40	.269	4.8
Braden Looper	30	175.0	183	12	12	4.94	51	87	1.34	.269	4.6
Kip Wells	26	162.2	186	7	17	5.70	78	122	1.62	.287	3.5
Anthony Reyes	20	107.1	108	2	14	6.04	43	74	1.41	.261	3.3
Brad Thompson	17	129.1	157	8	6	4.73	40	53	1.52	.301	5.2
Joel Piñeiro	11	63.2	69	6	4	3.96	12	40	1.27	.279	4.1
Todd Wellemeyer	11	63.2	52	3	2	3.11	29	51	1.27	.224	6.4
Mike Maroth	7	38.0	71	0	5	10.66	17	23	2.32	.394	5.4
Mark Mulder	3	11.0	22	0	3	12.27	7	3	2.64	.440	2.0
Randy Keisler	3	17.1	21	0	0	5.19	5	5	1.50	.309	5.0
Chris Carpenter	1	6.0	9	0	1	7.50	1	3	1.67	.346	1.0

=== Relief pitchers ===
Note: G = Games pitched; IP = Innings pitched; H = Hits allowed; W = Wins; L = Losses; SV = Saves; R = Runs allowed; ERA = Earned run average; BB = Walks allowed; SO = Strikeouts; WHIP = Walks+hits÷innings pitched; O-AVG = Opponents batting average

Player	G	IP	H	W	L	SV	R	ERA	BB	SO	WHIP	O-AVG
Jason Isringhausen	63	65.1	42	4	0	32	21	2.48	28	54	1.07	.179
Russ Springer	76	66.0	41	8	1	0	18	2.18	19	66	0.91	.181
Troy Percival	34*	40.0	24	3	0	0	8	1.80	10	36	0.85	.171
Randy Flores	70	55.0	71	3	0	1	31	4.25	15	47	1.56	.310
Ryan Franklin	69	80.0	70	4	4	1	28	3.04	11	44	1.01	.234
Tyler Johnson	55	38.0	31	1	1	0	18	4.03	16	24	1.24	.217
Kelvin Jiménez	34	42.0	56	3	0	0	36	7.50	17	24	1.74	.320
Andy Cavazos	17	20.0	27	0	0	0	27	10.35	16	15	2.15	.333
Brian Falkenborg	16	18.2	22	0	1	0	10	4.82	8	16	1.61	.293
Troy Cate	14	16.0	18	0	0	0	7	3.38	9	12	1.69	.290
Josh Hancock **	8	12.2	14	0	1	0	6	3.55	5	9	1.50	.286
Dennis Dove	3	3.0	5	0	0	0	5	15.00	1	1	2.00	.357
Aaron Miles	2	2.0	3	0	0	0	2	9.00	0	0	1.50	.375
Scott Spezio	1	1.0	0	0	0	0	0	0.00	1	0	1.00	.000

* incl. 1 GS, 1.0 IP, 1 H, 0 R, 0 BB, 0 SO

** died early in the morning of April 29

== Busch Stadium (Indexes) ==
(100 = Neutral Park, > 100 Ballpark favors, < 100 Ballpark inhibits
81 G; Cardinals: 2,704 AB; Opponents: 2,866 AB)

BA 102 R 93 H 103 2B 96 3B 104 HR 71 BB 96 SO 88 E 117 E-inf. 118 LHB-BA 103 LHB-HR 68 RHB-BA 102 RHB-HR 74

== Farm system ==
Level	Team	League	Manager
AAA	Memphis Redbirds	Pacific Coast League	Chris Maloney
AA	Springfield Cardinals	Texas League	Ron Warner
A	Palm Beach Cardinals	Florida State League	Gaylen Pitts
A	Quad Cities Swing	Midwest League	Keith Mitchell
A-Short Season	Batavia Muckdogs	New York–Penn League	Mark DeJohn
Rookie	Johnson City Cardinals	Appalachian League	Joe Almaraz
Rookie	GCL Cardinals	Gulf Coast League	Enrique Brito
