= 2006 National League Championship Series =

Major League Baseball playoff series

Team (Wins)	Managers	Season
St. Louis Cardinals (4)	Tony La Russa	83–78 (.516), GA: 1 1/2
New York Mets (3)	Willie Randolph	97–65 (.599), GA: 12
- Dates: October 11–19
- MVP: Jeff Suppan (St. Louis)
- Umpires: Tim Welke, Jim Joyce, Jerry Layne, Fieldin Culbreth, Jeff Kellogg, Gary Darling

Broadcast
- Television: Fox
- TV announcers: Joe Buck, Tim McCarver, Luis Gonzalez, and Ken Rosenthal
- Radio: ESPN
- Radio announcers: Dan Shulman and Dave Campbell
- NLDS: New York Mets over Los Angeles Dodgers (3–0); St. Louis Cardinals over San Diego Padres (3–1)

The 2006 National League Championship Series (NLCS) was a best-of-seven playoff in Major League Baseball's 2006 postseason pitting the top-seeded New York Mets and the third-seeded St. Louis Cardinals for the National League pennant. The Mets had home-field advantage due to their better record in the regular season.

The Series began on October 12 and ended on October 19; it was scheduled to begin on October 11, but was postponed a day because of inclement weather. The Cardinals defeated the heavily favored Mets in seven games to advance to the 2006 World Series against the Detroit Tigers, who they would go on to defeat in five games.

In the top of the 9th inning of Game 7 deadlocked in a 1–1 tie, the Cardinals took the lead with Yadier Molina's two-run home run off Mets reliever Aaron Heilman to put St. Louis ahead, 3–1. Adam Wainwright would then hold the Mets scoreless in the bottom of the 9th to give St. Louis their second pennant in three years and 17th in club history, placing them one behind the New York/San Francisco Giants and the Brooklyn/Los Angeles Dodgers for most in NL modern history (since 1903). The Cardinals were making their third consecutive appearance in the NLCS; manager Tony La Russa, who led St. Louis to the 2004 pennant and previously won AL titles with the Oakland Athletics from 1988–90, became the first manager in history to win multiple pennants in both leagues.

The Cardinals would go on to defeat the Detroit Tigers in the World Series in five games.

This was the second postseason meeting between the Mets and Cardinals. New York won the only prior meeting in the 2000 NLCS in five games.

== Summary ==
=== New York Mets vs. St. Louis Cardinals ===
St. Louis won the series, 4–3.

Game	Date	Score	Location	Time	Attendance
1	October 12†	St. Louis Cardinals – 0, New York Mets – 2	Shea Stadium	2:52	56,311
2	October 13†	St. Louis Cardinals – 9, New York Mets – 6	Shea Stadium	3:58	56,349
3	October 14	New York Mets – 0, St. Louis Cardinals – 5	Busch Stadium	2:53	47,053
4	October 15	New York Mets – 12, St. Louis Cardinals – 5	Busch Stadium	3:31	46,600
5	October 17‡	New York Mets – 2, St. Louis Cardinals – 4	Busch Stadium	3:26	46,496
6	October 18	St. Louis Cardinals – 2, New York Mets – 4	Shea Stadium	2:56	56,334
7	October 19	St. Louis Cardinals – 3, New York Mets – 1	Shea Stadium	3:23	56,357

†: Game 1 was postponed due to rain on October 11. Game 2 was subsequently pushed back a day as well.
‡: Game 5 was postponed due to rain on October 16.

== Game summaries ==
=== Game 1 ===
October 12, 2006 8:21 pm (EDT) at Shea Stadium in Queens, New York 61 °F (16 °C), partly cloudy
Team	1	2	3	4	5	6	7	8	9	R	H	E
St. Louis	0	0	0	0	0	0	0	0	0	0	4	0
New York	0	0	0	0	0	2	0	0	X	2	6	0
WP: Tom Glavine (1–0) LP: Jeff Weaver (0–1) Sv: Billy Wagner (1); Home runs: STL: None; NYM: Carlos Beltrán (1); Attendance: 56,311; Boxscore

On a game pushed back a day by rain, both pitchers pitched magnificently. Tom Glavine earned the win with seven innings of shutout baseball. The game's only runs came on a two-run homer by Carlos Beltrán off losing pitcher Jeff Weaver in the sixth following a two-out single by Paul Lo Duca. Glavine was aided by stellar defense, as the Mets turned two double plays. In the third inning, with runners on first and second, third baseman David Wright caught a line drive off the bat of David Eckstein and threw to second to double up Yadier Molina. In the following inning, Juan Encarnación flied out to shallow center to Beltrán, who threw to first on the run to double up Albert Pujols, who went 0-for-3 with a walk. Left fielder Endy Chávez also made an excellent diving play on a flare hit by Ronnie Belliard. He replaced Cliff Floyd, who left in the second inning when he reaggravated his injured Achilles tendon.

Following the game, Albert Pujols was controversially critical of Glavine's performance, saying that the Cardinals would have dominated him if they were on their "A" game. His exact words were:

"He wasn't good. He wasn't good at all ... I think we hit the ball hard, we didn't get some breaks. I say he wasn't good at all. We just didn't get some opportunities and that's it.... [He did the] same thing that he always does. Throw a changeup, fastball and that was it."

Pujols' comments drew criticism from fans, talk-show hosts, broadcasters, and even his own manager. Tony La Russa, while maintaining that Pujols made the remarks in the heat of the moment, said "It's not a good statement. Glavine deserves credit." Tom Glavine, when asked, merely said that everyone is entitled to their own opinion. His teammate Billy Wagner, on the other hand, said:

"I know if Albert would have said that about me, I wouldn't have been as veteraned, as seasoned about it ... I probably would have said something back. That's me. Tom is classy all the way ... Tom's done so much. Tom doesn't have to stoop to tell people how good he is ... His numbers speak for themselves. With 290 wins for somebody that has been in the league as long as he has is pretty self-explanatory ...Tommy's stature is much bigger than Pujols'. He's [got] a Hall of Fame induction coming. Albert doesn't. Albert's a great player, but you just don't know about tomorrow. In this clubhouse, Tommy is the epitome of class and great leadership. He leads by what he does in the field. He doesn't lead by what he says in the media."

=== Game 2 ===
October 13, 2006 8:06 pm (EDT) at Shea Stadium in Queens, New York 52 °F (11 °C), partly cloudy
Team	1	2	3	4	5	6	7	8	9	R	H	E
St. Louis	0	2	2	0	0	0	2	0	3	9	10	1
New York	3	1	0	0	1	1	0	0	0	6	9	2
WP: Josh Kinney (1–0) LP: Billy Wagner (0–1) Sv: Adam Wainwright (1); Home runs: STL: Jim Edmonds (1), So Taguchi (1); NYM: Carlos Delgado 2 (2); Attendance: 56,349; Boxscore

In Game 2, the Cardinals erased three deficits en route to a 9–6 victory. In the first inning, Carlos Delgado hit a three-run home run off the Cardinals' ace Chris Carpenter. Yadier Molina then drove in two runs with a bases-loaded double in the second inning off of John Maine. In the bottom of the second, Endy Chavez hit a leadoff double, moved to third on a groundout and scored on José Reyes's, but Jim Edmonds's home run after a walk tied the game in the third. Delgado's home run in the fifth put the Mets back on top 5–4. Next inning, Cardinals reliever Josh Hancock walked Reyes, who scored on Paul Lo Duca's double, but Scott Spiezio, who started the game at third base in place of an injured Scott Rolen, had two hits and three RBIs, including a two-run triple on an 0–2 pitch in the seventh inning to tie the game at six off of Guillermo Mota.Lefty closer Billy Wagner came into the game in the top of the ninth inning. Left fielder So Taguchi, a right-hitting defensive replacement homered on the ninth pitch of the at-bat to put the Cardinals ahead, 7–6. Albert Pujols doubled and moved to third on a groundout before Spiezio's RBI double and Juan Encarnación's single extended the Cardinals' lead to 9–6. Tyler Johnson and Adam Wainwright retired the Mets in order in the bottom of the ninth as the Cardinals' win tied the series 1–1.

=== Game 3 ===
October 14, 2006 7:16 pm (CDT) at Busch Stadium (III) in St. Louis, Missouri 52 °F (11 °C), clear
Team	1	2	3	4	5	6	7	8	9	R	H	E
New York	0	0	0	0	0	0	0	0	0	0	3	0
St. Louis	2	3	0	0	0	0	0	0	X	5	8	0
WP: Jeff Suppan (1–0) LP: Steve Trachsel (0–1); Home runs: NYM: None; STL: Jeff Suppan (1); Attendance: 47,053; Boxscore

Back in St. Louis for the next three games, St. Louis starter Jeff Suppan pitched eight innings as the Cardinals defeated the Mets, 5–0. Scott Spiezio hit a two-run triple (his second two-run triple in as many games) in the bottom of the first inning to put the Cardinals ahead, 2–0. The Cardinals loaded the bases on two walks afterward, but Mets starter Steve Trachsel struck out Yadier Molina looking to end the inning. Next inning, Suppan's leadoff home run made it 3–0, who then loaded the bases on two walks and a line drive off the bat of Preston Wilson that hit Trachsel, who left with a bruised thigh. Mets reliever Darren Oliver threw a wild pitch to Jim Edmonds that let David Eckstein score before Edmonds's RBI groundout plated the last run of the game. Oliver then pitched six shutout innings. After the game, the Mets had not scored in 12 consecutive innings, making it 14 before scoring in the third inning of Game 4.

=== Game 4 ===
October 15, 2006 7:05 pm (CDT) at Busch Stadium (III) in St. Louis, Missouri 62 °F (17 °C), overcast
Team	1	2	3	4	5	6	7	8	9	R	H	E
New York	0	0	2	0	3	6	1	0	0	12	14	1
St. Louis	0	1	1	0	1	2	0	0	0	5	11	1
WP: Óliver Pérez (1–0) LP: Brad Thompson (0–1); Home runs: NYM: Carlos Beltrán 2 (3), David Wright (1), Carlos Delgado (3); STL: David Eckstein (1), Jim Edmonds (2), Yadier Molina (1); Attendance: 46,600; Boxscore

Game 4 was a pivotal game for the Mets, who were faced with a two-games-to-one deficit. They sent Óliver Pérez, a young lefty picked up at the trade deadline from the Pittsburgh Pirates, to face the Cardinals' own young starter, Anthony Reyes. In a game that would see an NLCS-record-tying seven home runs, the Cardinals grabbed an early lead in the bottom of the second on a Yadier Molina single. It seemed to be a repeat of the night before, but in the top of the third the Mets hit two home runs, one being Carlos Beltrán's second of the series and sixth against the Cardinals in NLCS play, and another representing David Wright's first hit of the series and first homer of the playoffs. The lead was short-lived, as Scott Spiezio walked with one out, then scored on Juan Encarnación's two-out triple to tie the game. The game would stay tied until the top of the fifth inning, when Paul Lo Duca reached on an error by Cardinals second baseman Ronnie Belliard, Beltrán managed a walk, and Carlos Delgado scored an opposite-field three-run homer, his third of the series, to make it 5–2 Mets and knock starter Brad Thompson out of the game. David Eckstein pulled the Cards back in the bottom of the fifth with a leadoff homer, but, in the top of the sixth, the Mets extended the lead. José Reyes and Paul Lo Duca hit back-to-back singles off of Josh Hancock, and Beltrán walked to load the bases. Delgado then hit a ground-rule double to drive in two runs, and then Wright walked. Tyler Johnson relieved Hancock and Shawn Green singled to drive in one run and José Valentín, who, at that point, was only 3-for-20 in the playoffs, hit a bases-clearing double down the left field line to make it 11–3. The Cardinals got home runs from Edmonds and Molina to make it an 11–5 game, but Mets manager Willie Randolph then pulled starter Pérez and bought in submarine pitcher Chad Bradford to try and limit the damage. Beltrán would tie the NLCS record of seven home runs with another in the seventh off of Braden Looper en route to a final score of 12–5. Beltrán also tied Babe Ruth for the all-time postseason record of seven home runs against the Cardinals, having hit four against them in the 2004 National League Championship Series while playing for the Houston Astros.

=== Game 5 ===
October 17, 2006 7:20 pm (CDT) at Busch Stadium (III) in St. Louis, Missouri 61 °F (16 °C), partly cloudy
Team	1	2	3	4	5	6	7	8	9	R	H	E
New York	0	0	0	2	0	0	0	0	0	2	8	0
St. Louis	0	0	0	2	1	1	0	0	X	4	10	0
WP: Jeff Weaver (1–1) LP: Tom Glavine (1–1) Sv: Adam Wainwright (2); Home runs: NYM: None; STL: Albert Pujols (1), Chris Duncan (1); Attendance: 46,496; Boxscore

After Game 5 was pushed back a day by rain, giving their starter now four days' normal rest instead of three days' short rest, the Mets sought a 3–2 lead in the NLCS. However, pitcher Tom Glavine could not stifle the Cardinals' offense. After the Mets jumped out to a 2–0 lead on Jose Valentin's double off of Jeff Weaver, the next half-inning Albert Pujols struck for his first home run and RBI of the series to cut the Mets' lead in half. Glavine then walked Scott Rolen and allowed a single to Jim Edmonds before Ronnie Belliard tied the game with a single to left. David Eckstein singled to lead off the fifth and scored on Preston Wilson double to put the Cardinals up 3–2. St. Louis padded their lead in the sixth through a pinch-hit home run by rookie Chris Duncan off of Pedro Feliciano that made the final score 4–2, Cardinals. The win moved the Cardinals within one of their second National League pennant in three years.

=== Game 6 ===
October 18, 2006 8:20 pm (EDT) at Shea Stadium in Queens, New York 69 °F (21 °C), overcast
Team	1	2	3	4	5	6	7	8	9	R	H	E
St. Louis	0	0	0	0	0	0	0	0	2	2	7	1
New York	1	0	0	1	0	0	2	0	X	4	10	0
WP: John Maine (1–0) LP: Chris Carpenter (0–1); Home runs: STL: None; NYM: José Reyes (1); Attendance: 56,334; Boxscore

Facing elimination, the Mets sent John Maine to start Game 6. He allowed no runs in 5 1/3 innings, earning the win for the Mets. José Reyes hit a leadoff home run in the bottom of the first, giving the Mets a lead that would never be relinquished. Reyes became the first Met to lead off with a home run in the first inning of a postseason game since former outfielder Lenny Dykstra in Game 3 of the 1986 World Series against the Boston Red Sox. The Cardinals stranded several runners against Maine. In the top of the first inning, with runners on second and third and one out, Maine struck out Jim Edmonds. After Maine hit Juan Encarnación with a pitch to load the bases, Scott Rolen flew out. In the top of the third, with a runner on second and nobody out, Maine struck out Scott Spiezio and intentionally walked Albert Pujols. Edmonds then flew out and Maine struck out Encarnación to finish the job. Shawn Green hit an RBI single in the fourth off of starter Chris Carpenter and Paul Lo Duca added two more with an RBI hit in the seventh off of Braden Looper. Billy Wagner came on in the ninth and allowed a leadoff single to Juan Encarnación and subsequent double to Scott Rolen. After retiring the next two batters, Wagner gave up a two-RBI double to So Taguchi before retiring David Eckstein to end the game.

=== Game 7 ===
October 19, 2006 8:20 pm (EDT) at Shea Stadium in Queens, New York 64 °F (18 °C), chance of rain
Team	1	2	3	4	5	6	7	8	9	R	H	E
St. Louis	0	1	0	0	0	0	0	0	2	3	6	1
New York	1	0	0	0	0	0	0	0	0	1	4	1
WP: Randy Flores (1–0) LP: Aaron Heilman (0–1) Sv: Adam Wainwright (3); Home runs: STL: Yadier Molina (2); NYM: None; Attendance: 56,357; Boxscore

External videos
- 2006 NLCS Game 7 (Cardinals vs. Mets) on YouTube

In the decisive Game 7, the Mets sent Game 4 winner Óliver Pérez to the mound against Jeff Suppan. The Mets jumped out to an early 1–0 lead when David Wright drove in Carlos Beltrán in the first with a bloop single into right field. The Cardinals tied the game in the second when Ronnie Belliard hit into a squeeze play that scored Jim Edmonds from third. In the fifth, with runners on first and second and two gone, Albert Pujols came up to the plate. Even with Chad Bradford warming up in the bullpen, Willie Randolph decided to stay with Pérez. He got Pujols to pop out. Pérez ran into some more trouble in the sixth with a runner on and one out when Scott Rolen hit a long fly ball to left field to create one of the greatest defensive plays in postseason history.

The ball cleared the fence, but Endy Chávez amazingly brought it back by snow-coning the ball, jumping from the edge of the warning track to snag what looked to be a certain home run. He then threw the ball to first base quickly to double off Jim Edmonds, who had rounded second on his way to third, to end the inning. He received two curtain calls from the Shea crowd. With the bases loaded and one out in the bottom of the sixth, José Valentín and Chávez failed to get the go-ahead run in.

With the score 1–1 in the top of the ninth, Yadier Molina, with Scott Rolen on first, hit a deep fly off Aaron Heilman in the same general direction as the one Rolen hit in the sixth. This ball was hit too high for Chávez to catch, and it gave the Cardinals a 3–1 lead, with only three outs in the bottom of the ninth separating them from a pennant.

However, the Mets would not go quietly. Rookie closer Adam Wainwright yielded singles to Valentín and Chávez to lead off the ninth. After getting a strikeout and a fly-out, Wainwright walked Paul Lo Duca to bring up Carlos Beltrán with the bases loaded. Down 0–2 to the rookie Wainwright, Beltrán looked at a curveball on the outside corner at the knees for a called strike three to end the series.

This was the last playoff game played in Shea Stadium and the last postseason appearance for the Mets until 2015, six years after Citi Field opened. It was the second and last time that a visiting team won a postseason series at Shea (the other being the Yankees' victory over the Mets in the 2000 World Series).

== Composite box ==
2006 NLCS (4–3): St. Louis Cardinals over New York Mets

Team	1	2	3	4	5	6	7	8	9	R	H	E
St. Louis Cardinals	2	7	3	2	2	3	2	0	7	28	56	4
New York Mets	5	1	2	3	4	9	3	0	0	27	54	4
Total attendance: 365,500 Average attendance: 52,214

== Aftermath ==
The Cardinals would win the World Series by defeating the heavily-favored Detroit Tigers in five games. With 83 wins, the Cardinals set a record for the worst regular season win–loss total for any championship team. They would win another World Series in 2011 and make another World Series appearance in 2013 (where they lost to the Boston Red Sox). Manager Tony La Russa retired after the 2011 season, going out a champion. LaRussa would unretire ten years later in 2021 when he became the manager of the White Sox, a team he managed from 1979–1986.

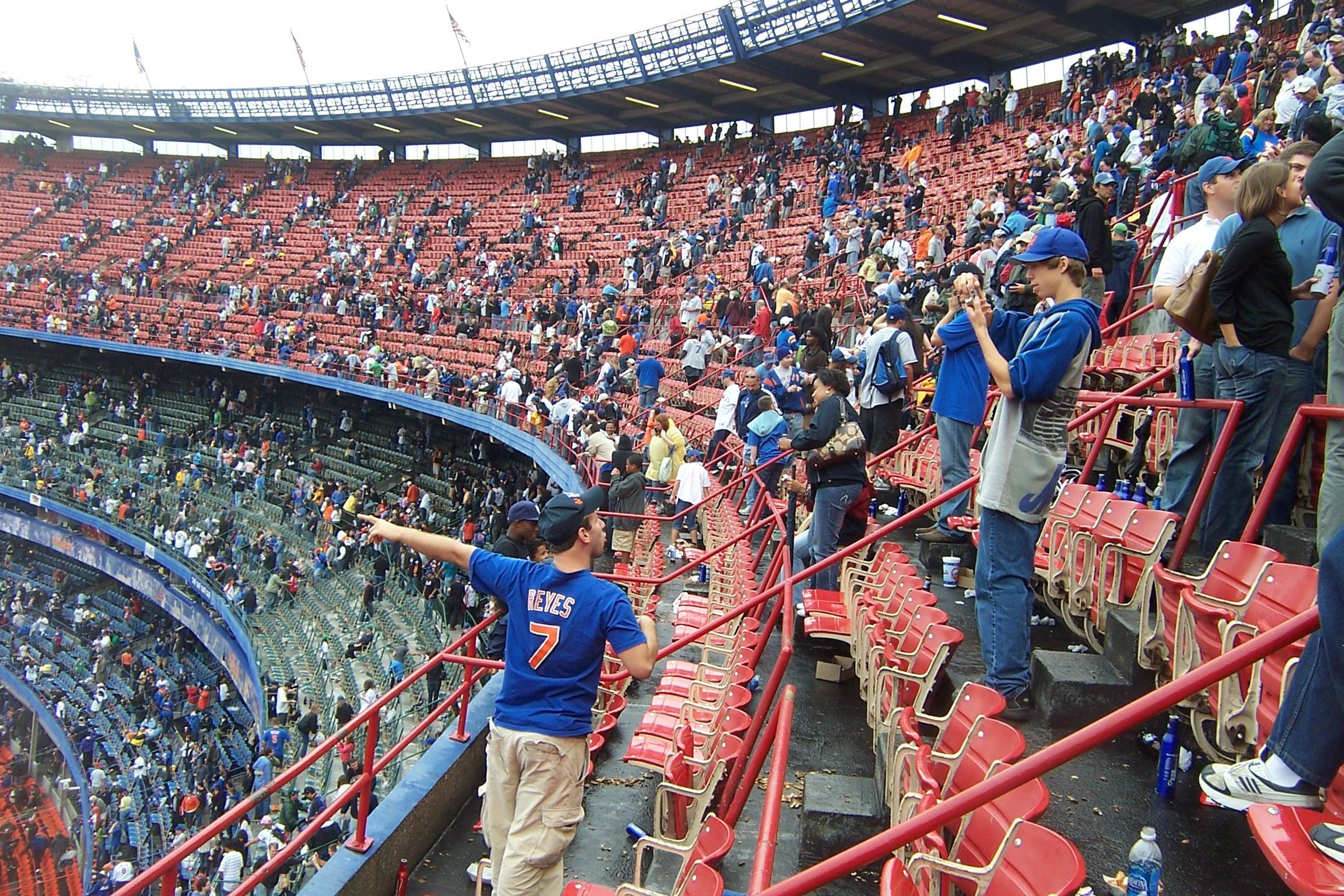
September 27, 2008: Fans staying after conclusion of the second-to-last game ever at Shea Stadium, taking pictures and one last look.

As for the Mets, many commentators and fans had predicted that 2006 would be the beginning of a dynasty. They had dominated the National League that season, winning 97 games when no one else won more than 88, and they had a deep and young core, with Beltran, Wright, and Reyes being under 30 (the latter two being under 25). Supporting those three were Hall of Fame caliber players such as Carlos Delgado, Tom Glavine, Pedro Martínez, and Billy Wagner.

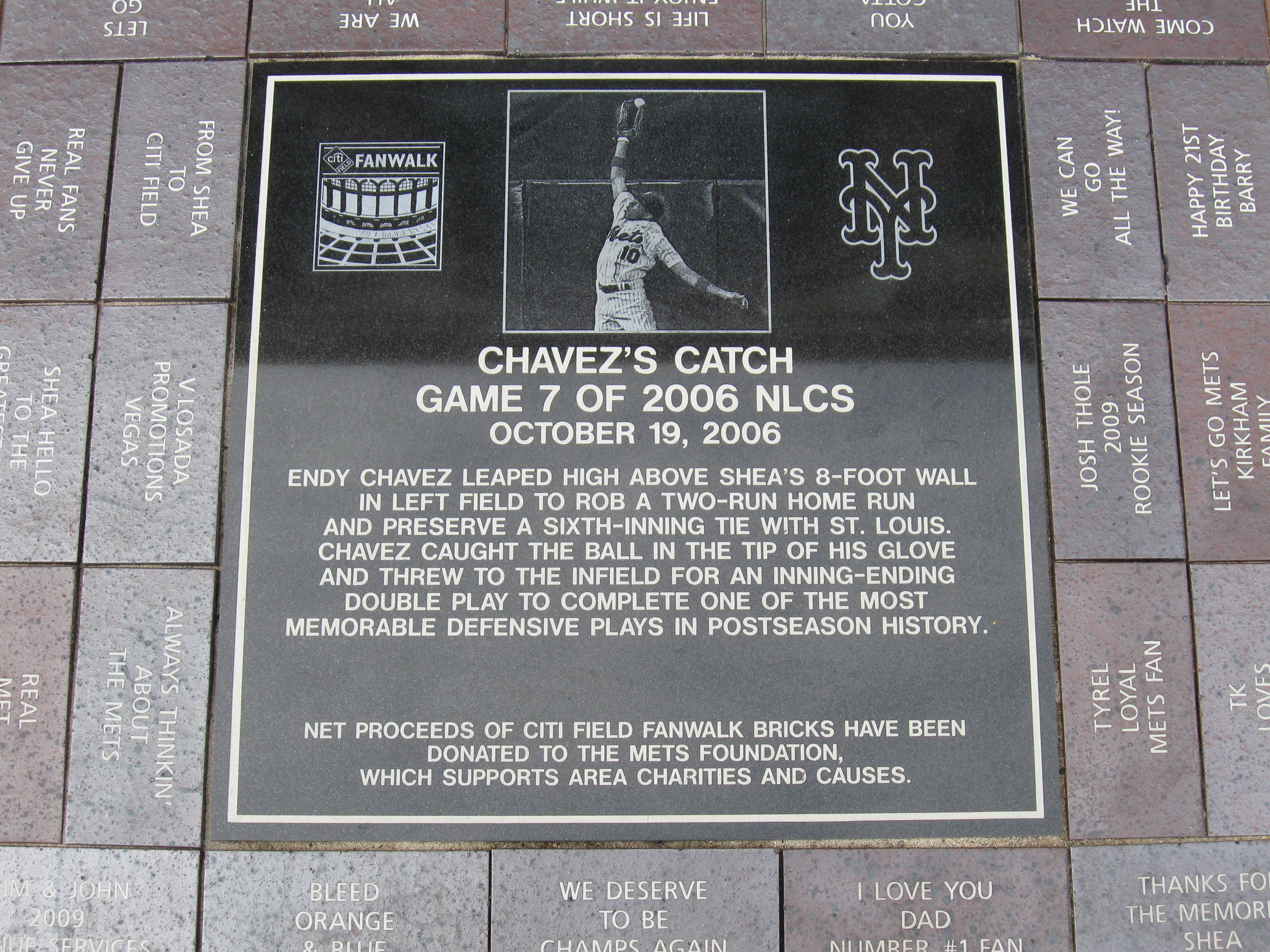
Plaque outside of Citi Field honoring Chávez's catch in the 2006 NLCS

Nonetheless, 2006 stands as the only major achievement for this group. They suffered a historic collapse at the end of the 2007 season, losing 12 of their final 17 games to blow a 7-game division lead and miss the postseason by one game. After a smaller late-season collapse the next season (3 1/2-game division lead with 17 games left), they again missed the postseason by one game. 2008 also marked the Mets final year at Shea Stadium. Following this, they suffered through six straight losing seasons and ultimately would not return to the postseason until 2015 - in which they won their fifth NL Pennant in franchise history - when Wright was the only Met from 2006 still on the roster. Manager Willie Randolph was fired in the middle of the 2008 season, Delgado played his last game in 2009, General Manager Omar Minaya was fired after 2010 (In 2017, he was brought back as a Special Assistant to then-General Manager Sandy Alderson), Beltran was dealt away at the 2011 trade deadline, and Reyes left via free agency that offseason. Reyes would eventually return to the Mets in 2016; he, along with Wright, would leave the Mets after the 2018 season - Reyes's contract was not renewed, and Wright retired as a result of spinal stenosis.

Despite the loss, Endy Chavez became a cult hero for his game-saving catch in Game 7. Mets' radio broadcaster Gary Cohen called it, “not just the play of the year, but the maybe the play of the franchise’s history." The left field entrance gate of the Mets' current ballpark, Citi Field, features a metal silhouette of a baseball player making a leaping catch similar to the one Chávez made during the 2006 NLCS. There is also a plaque at Citi Field that commemorates Chavez's catch (see photo).

In 2022, Adam Wainwright and Yadier Molina, who were the battery that closed out the 2006 NLCS, broke the record for most games started by a starting pitcher and catcher. For the rest of their careers following the 2006 NLCS, both men were booed in New York when playing the Mets for their roles in Game 7.

== See also ==
- Cardinals–Mets rivalry
