= Troy Cate =

American baseball player (born 1980)

- Pitcher
- Born: October 21, 1980 (age 46); Fallbrook, California, U.S.
- Batted: Left Threw: Left

MLB debut
- May 27, 2007, for the St. Louis Cardinals

Last MLB appearance
- July 21, 2007, for the St. Louis Cardinals

MLB statistics
- Win–loss record: 0–0
- Earned run average: 3.38
- Strikeouts: 12
- Stats at Baseball Reference

Teams
- St. Louis Cardinals (2007)

Troy Patrick Cate (born October 21, 1980) is an American former professional baseball pitcher. He played one season in Major League Baseball (MLB) for the St. Louis Cardinals in 2007.

He went to school and played baseball at Ricks College, now called Brigham Young University–Idaho. After finishing school there, he served as a Mormon missionary in England.

== Career ==
=== Seattle Mariners ===
Cate was drafted by the Seattle Mariners in the 6th round of the 2002 Major League Baseball draft, 190th overall. He signed with the Mariners and was assigned to the Everett AquaSox. In 2003, Cate played for the High-A Inland Empire 66ers and the Triple-A Tacoma Rainiers. In 2004 he played for Inland Empire and the Double-A San Antonio Missions. In 2005, Cate spent the entire season with Inland Empire and became a free agent at seasons end.

=== St. Louis Cardinals ===
Cate signed a minor league contract with the St. Louis Cardinals organization in the 2005/2006 offseason, and spent 2006 with the High-A Palm Beach Cardinals and Double-A Springfield Cardinals. He began 2007 for the Triple-A Memphis Redbirds. Cate made his major league debut for the St. Louis Cardinals on May 27, 2007, against the Washington Nationals. On the season, Cate pitched in to a 3.38 ERA over 14 games for the Cardinals paired with 12 strikeouts. He became a free agent after the season.

=== Oakland Athletics ===
The Oakland Athletics signed Cate to a minor league contract with an invitation to spring training on November 21, 2007. On May 12, 2008, Cate was released by the Athletics organization after playing in 12 games for the Triple-A Sacramento River Cats.

=== Orange County Flyers ===
He signed with the Orange County Flyers of the Golden Baseball League shortly after his release. Cate pitched to a 1.15 ERA with 18 strikeouts over 3 games for the Flyers.

=== Milwaukee Brewers ===
On June 23, 2008, Cate signed a minor league contract with the Milwaukee Brewers and was assigned to the Huntsville Stars of the Double-A Southern League. On July 22, he was promoted to the Triple-A Nashville Sounds. He became a free agent at the end of the season.

=== Toronto Blue Jays ===
On July 27, 2009, Cate signed a minor league deal with the Toronto Blue Jays organization and was assigned to the Double-A New Hampshire Fisher Cats. He played in one game for New Hampshire and was released on August 4.

=== Quebec Capitales ===
In 2010, Cate signed with the Quebec Capitales of the Can-Am League. He would play in 12 games and pitch to a 3.39 ERA over 74 1/3 innings pitched. He became a free agent after the season.

=== Somerset Patriots ===
In 2011, Cate signed with the Somerset Patriots of the Atlantic League of Professional Baseball. Cate only pitched in 3 games for Somerset before being released.

=== Calgary Vipers ===
Shortly after his release, Cate signed with the Calgary Vipers of the North American League. He would pitch in 1 game for Calgary, allowing 6 runs over 4 innings. He would become a free agent at the end of the season.
