= Kelvin Jiménez =

Dominican baseball player (born 1980)

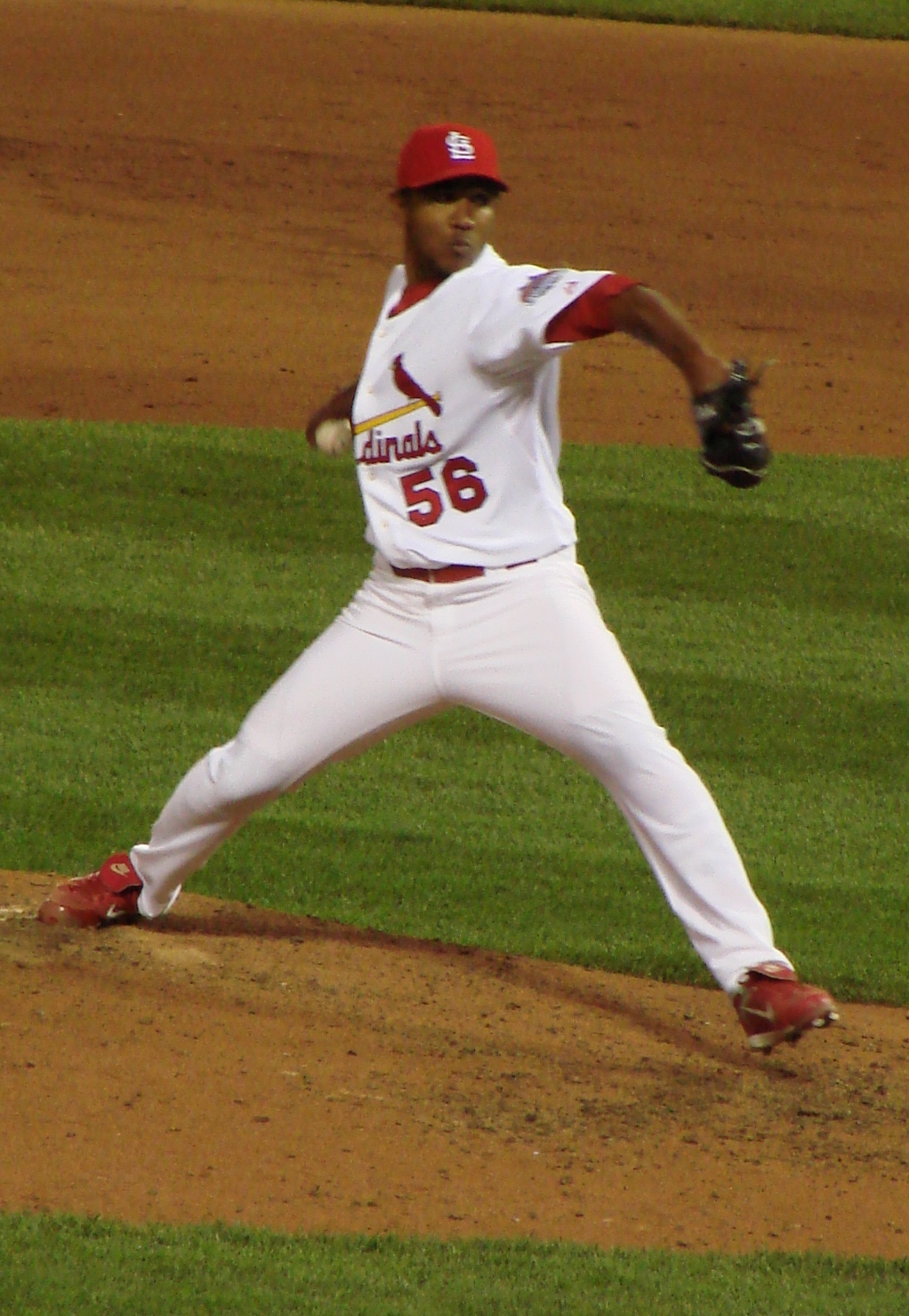
- Relief pitcher
- Born: October 27, 1980 (age 45); Sánchez, Dominican Republic
- Batted: Right Threw: Right

MLB debut
- April 27, 2007, for the St. Louis Cardinals

Last MLB appearance
- September 28, 2008, for the St. Louis Cardinals

MLB statistics
- Win–loss record: 3–0
- Earned run average: 6.82
- Strikeouts: 35
- Stats at Baseball Reference

Teams
- St. Louis Cardinals (2007–2008); Doosan Bears (2010); Tohoku Rakuten Golden Eagles (2011–2012)

Kelvin Rogelio Jimenez Peña (born October 27, 1980) is a Dominican former professional baseball relief pitcher. He played in Major League Baseball (MLB) for the St. Louis Cardinals.

== Career ==
Jiménez made his major league debut on April 27, 2007, for the St. Louis Cardinals. On November 3, 2008, he was claimed off waivers by the Toronto Blue Jays. He was then claimed off waivers on November 17, 2008 by the Chicago White Sox.

Jiménez signed with the Doosan Bears in the KBO league for the 2010 season.
