= Andy Cavazos =

American baseball player (born 1981)

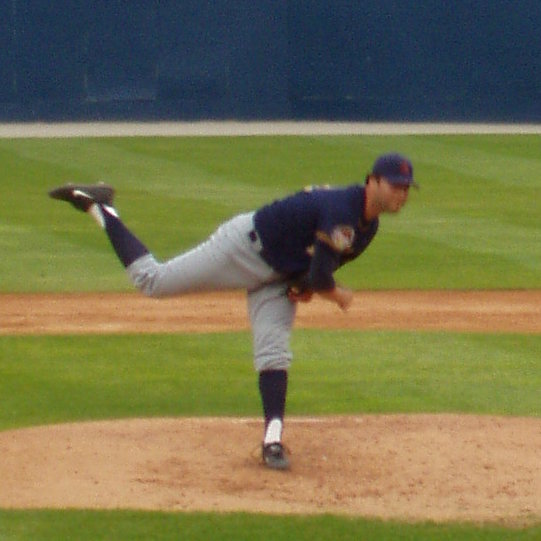
- Cavazos with the Peoria Chiefs in 2003
- Relief pitcher
- Born: January 5, 1981 (age 44); Freeport, Texas, U.S.
- Batted: Right Threw: Right

MLB debut
- June 7, 2007, for the St. Louis Cardinals

Last appearance
- September 24, 2007, for the St. Louis Cardinals

MLB statistics
- Win–loss record: 0–0
- Earned run average: 10.35
- Strikeouts: 15
- Stats at Baseball Reference

Teams
- St. Louis Cardinals (2007)

Andres Cavazos (born January 5, 1981) is an American former Major League Baseball pitcher. He made his major league debut for the St. Louis Cardinals on June 7, 2007, against the Cincinnati Reds.

He was released by the Cardinals on November 20, 2007. On January 7, 2008, he signed a minor league deal with the New York Mets, but was released during spring training. He signed with the Chicago Cubs two weeks later, but was released in late June. He played in the Mexican Triple-A League for the Quintana Roo Tigres in 2008.

Cavazos is related to retired professional wrestler Tito Santana.
