= Jeff Suppan =

American baseball player (born 1975)

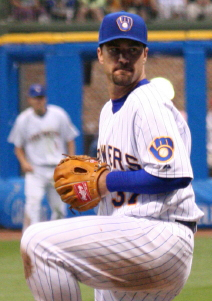
- Suppan with the Milwaukee Brewers in 2009
- Pitcher
- Born: January 2, 1975 (age 51); Oklahoma City, Oklahoma, U.S.
- Batted: Right Threw: Right

MLB debut
- July 17, 1995, for the Boston Red Sox

Last MLB appearance
- May 28, 2012, for the San Diego Padres

MLB statistics
- Win–loss record: 140–146
- Earned run average: 4.70
- Strikeouts: 1,390
- Stats at Baseball Reference

Teams
- Boston Red Sox (1995–1997); Arizona Diamondbacks (1998); Kansas City Royals (1998–2002); Pittsburgh Pirates (2003); Boston Red Sox (2003); St. Louis Cardinals (2004–2006); Milwaukee Brewers (2007–2010); St. Louis Cardinals (2010); San Diego Padres (2012)

Career highlights and awards
- World Series champion (2006); NLCS MVP (2006)

Jeffrey Scot Suppan (/ˈsuːpɑːn/; born January 2, 1975) is an American former professional baseball pitcher and current professional baseball coach who played 17 seasons in Major League Baseball (MLB). He played for the Boston Red Sox, Arizona Diamondbacks, Kansas City Royals, Pittsburgh Pirates, St. Louis Cardinals, Milwaukee Brewers, and San Diego Padres.

== Early life ==
Suppan pitched at Crespi Carmelite High School in California's San Fernando Valley. He pitched one no-hitter as a freshman and another as a senior against Harvard-Westlake School in the midst of a 42-inning scoreless streak. Suppan also played first base and hit .480 with a .950 slugging percentage as a senior. As a pitcher, he had a 0.73 WHIP, a 0.92 earned run average and a 9.07 strikeout-to-walk ratio. The Los Angeles Times named him their 1993 San Fernando Valley Player of the Year.

Suppan committed to play college baseball at UCLA over offers from USC, Nevada, Cal and Cal State Long Beach. He was selected by the Boston Red Sox with the 49th pick of the 1993 Major League Baseball draft and signed for $190,000.

== Professional career ==
=== Boston Red Sox ===
He played with the Red Sox through the 1997 season. In his first three seasons, Suppan compiled a 9–6 record, his 1997 season marked his only season in Boston in which he made more than 10 starts. Although his record was 7–3 in 1997, his ERA was 5.69 in 22 starts.

=== Arizona Diamondbacks ===
Suppan was selected in the 1997 MLB expansion draft by the Arizona Diamondbacks. In his lone season with Arizona, Suppan was 1–7 in 13 starts with a 6.68 ERA.

=== Kansas City Royals ===
Late in the 1998 season, he was traded to the Kansas City Royals, as a player to be named later, completing a trade that saw Jermaine Allensworth join the New York Mets and the Diamondbacks acquire Bernard Gilkey. Suppan was a mainstay for the Royals rotation, averaging 33 starts and 10 wins through his 4 seasons with the team. From 1999 to 2001, Suppan won 10 games in each season. In 2002, Suppan suffered his worst season as a Royal, going 9–16 in 33 starts.

=== Pittsburgh Pirates ===
In 2003, he opened the season for the Pittsburgh Pirates after signing a one-year deal with them in January. Through 21 starts, Suppan was 10–7 with a 3.57 ERA for the Pirates.

=== Second Stint with Boston ===
Suppan was dealt at the trading deadline back to the Red Sox for their playoff stretch run, along with Anastacio Martinez and Brandon Lyon for prospects Freddy Sanchez and Mike Gonzalez. Suppan did not perform well in his return to Boston, going 3–4 with a 5.57 ERA and surrendering 12 home runs.

=== St. Louis Cardinals ===
The Cardinals signed Suppan as a free agent in 2004, and he embarked upon a career year, posting a 16–9 record and a 4.16 earned run average, with 110 strikeouts, 65 walks, and 192 hits allowed in 188 innings. Suppan helped lead the Cards to the 2004 World Series, where he started Game 3. His baserunning blunder in Game 3 was one of the defining moments of the Series.

In 2005, he improved on his previous year's performance, going 16–10 with a 3.57 ERA. He started Game 4 of the National League Championship series against the Houston Astros, allowing one run over five innings but came away with a no-decision after the Astros took the lead later in the game.

Suppan has hit two career Major League home runs, both off Steve Trachsel of the New York Mets. His first was on September 10, 2005. The Cardinals won the game 4–2. He hit his second in Game 3 of the 2006 National League Championship Series. The Cardinals would win the game 5–0 to take a 2–1 lead in the series.

Suppan started Game 7 of the 2006 NLCS against the New York Mets. He did not factor in the decision, giving up only one run in seven innings, but the Cardinals won 3–1, earning him the National League Championship Series MVP. Suppan in the 2006 NLCS had a 0.60 ERA in 15 innings pitched.

=== Milwaukee Brewers ===
During the 2006 offseason, Suppan signed a four-year, $42 million contract with the Milwaukee Brewers.

Initial excitement in Milwaukee quickly waned as Suppan's performance declined over time. From 2007 to 2009, his walk rate, home runs allowed, and ERA climbed while his strikeouts declined. Milwaukee fans began a practice of wearing paper bags over their heads and throwing soup cans on to the field during Suppan's starts. Between 1995 and 2006, Suppan held a career ERA of 1.76 at Miller Park, where he was to pitch for the Brewers in 2007.

Suppan, along with teammates J. J. Hardy, Bill Hall, and Chris Capuano appeared in an episode of The Young and the Restless which aired on CBS on June 20, 2007. On June 7, 2008, Suppan was placed on the 15-day disabled list, his first DL stint since 1996. After being sent to the bullpen, Suppan's run with Milwaukee ended after 15 appearances. On June 7, 2010, the Brewers released Suppan.

=== St. Louis Cardinals (second stint) ===
On June 14, 2010, Suppan signed with the St. Louis Cardinals. He became a free agent following the season.

=== San Francisco Giants ===
On January 25, 2011, the San Francisco Giants signed Suppan to a minor league deal. On March 29, the Giants released Suppan.

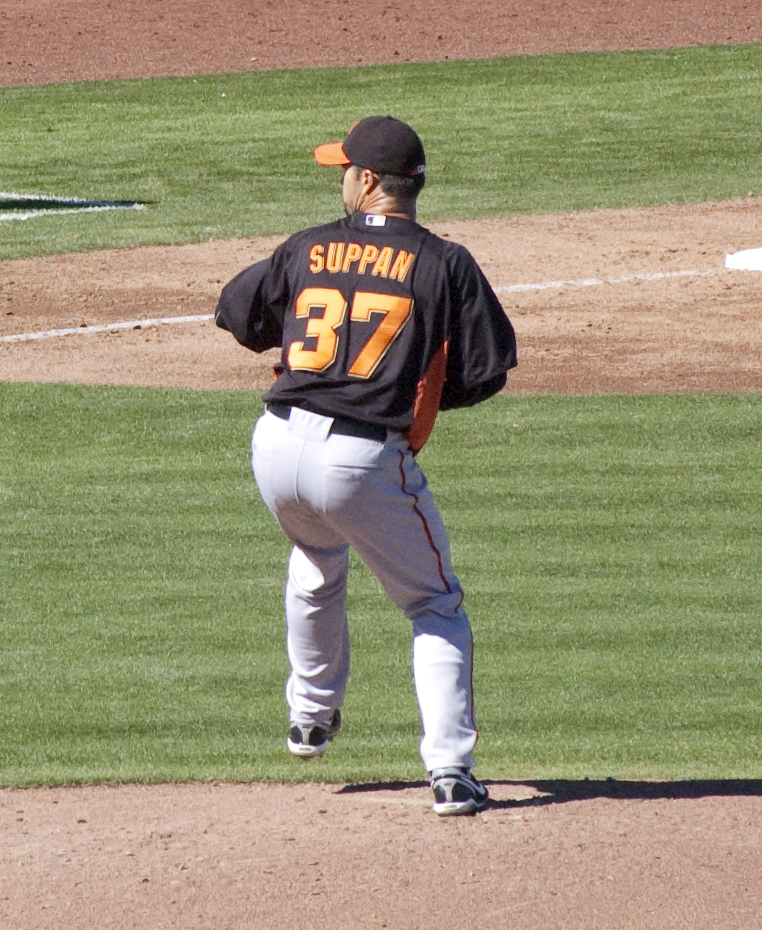
Suppan pitching

=== Second Stint with Kansas City ===
On April 4, 2011, the Kansas City Royals signed Suppan to a minor league deal. He spent the entire season with the Omaha Storm Chasers. He elected free agency after the season on November 2.

=== San Diego Padres ===
On February 8, 2012, Suppan signed a minor league contract with the San Diego Padres. After a rash of injuries to the Padres rotation, Suppan was called up to the majors. He made his first start on May 2, 2012. It was his first time making a start since the 2010 season. He was designated for assignment on June 1. Suppan opted for free agency over a minor league assignment with the Padres on June 5, 2012, according to the Padres' official website.

=== Retirement ===
Suppan announced his retirement as a player on January 2, 2014, his 39th birthday. The announcement was timed for 2 p.m. PST, to honor his mother, Kathleen Suppan, who died six years earlier on the same day and at the same time.

Suppan was the pitching coach for the Idaho Falls Chukars of the Pioneer League. The Chukars were the Rookie-Advanced affiliate of Suppan's former team, the Kansas City Royals. In 2019, Suppan left the Chukars to become a roving minor league co-ordinator for the Royals organization.

== Pitching style ==
As with many older pitchers, Suppan relied comparatively little on pitch speed to get outs. He was a finesse pitcher, using a variety of pitches with good movement to create weak contact for hitters. His expansive pitch repertoire included a four-seam fastball and sinker in the mid-upper 80s, a cut fastball in the low-mid 80s, a changeup around 80, a big curveball at 70 and a slider in the upper 70s.

== Restaurant ==
Suppan, whose nickname is "Soup", is also a restaurateur. His restaurant, Soup's Grill, is jointly operated with his wife. It is located in Woodland Hills, California. Soup's Grill closed in January 2016 to devote his time to being pitching coach for the Idaho Falls Chukars.

== Religion and activism ==
Suppan is a devout Roman Catholic, appearing in the DVD Champions Of Faith and in Rosary Stars Praying the Gospel. He has spoken to the National Catholic Register about his faith.

He appeared in a political advertisement alongside Patricia Heaton, Jim Caviezel, Mike Sweeney, and Kurt Warner, among others, during the 2006 World Series. The advertisement aired in opposition to Missouri Constitutional Amendment 2 (2006), which allows in Missouri any kind of embryonic stem cell research that is legal under federal law. The advertisement aired shortly after the airing of an earlier advertisement featuring actor Michael J. Fox The Fox advertisement had supported Amendment 2, as well as the campaign of United States Senate candidate Claire McCaskill. The Suppan advertisement did not explicitly mention the Senate race. The timing of both ads during a World Series that featured the St. Louis Cardinals was intended to draw the particular attention of Missouri voters.

== Career highlights ==
- 2006 World Series Champion
- 2006 National League Championship Series MVP

== See also ==
- List of people from Oklahoma City
- List of World Series starting pitchers
- St. Louis Cardinals award winners and league leaders
