= So Taguchi =

Japanese baseball player (born 1969)

So Taguchi 田口 壮
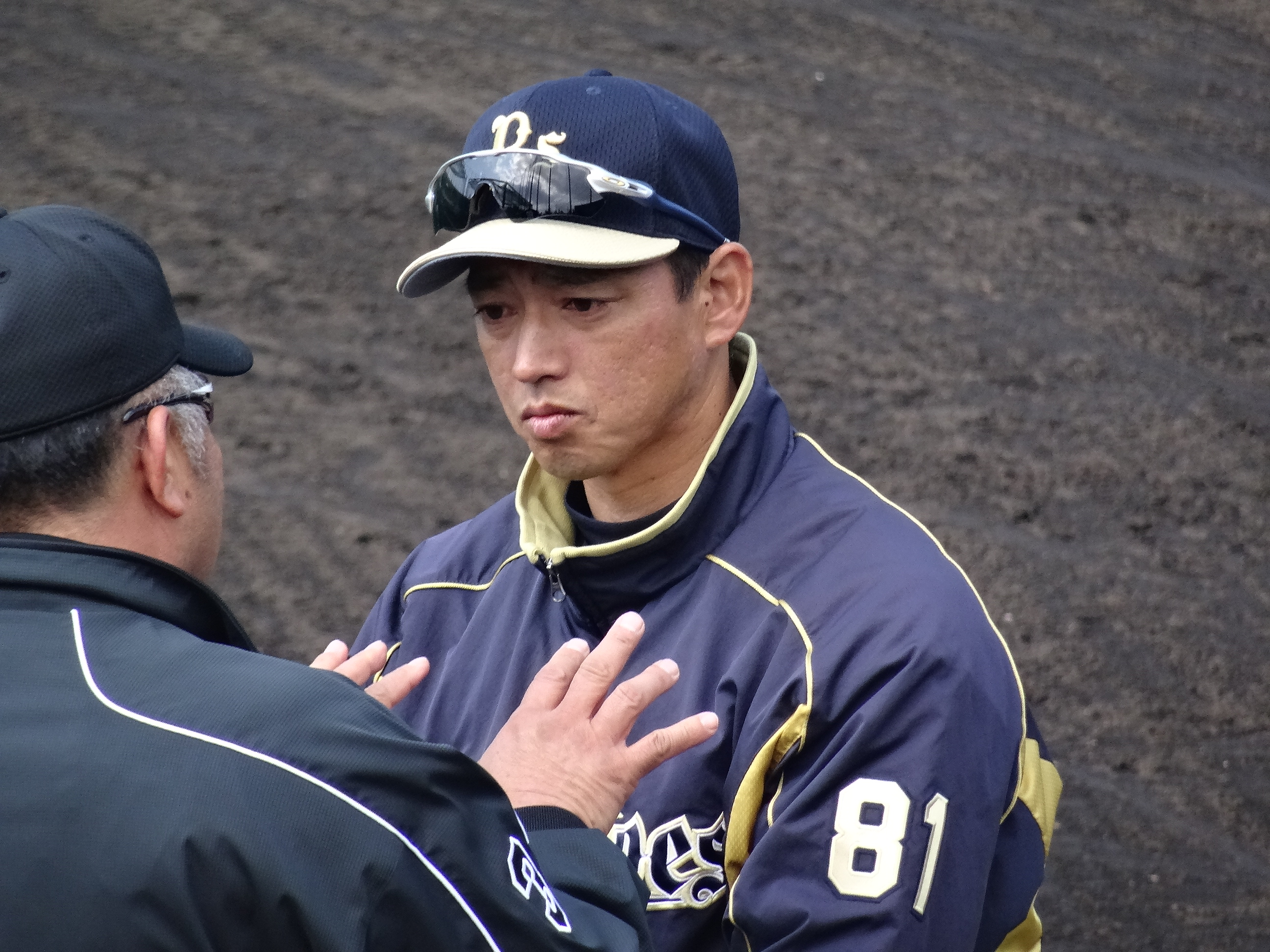
- Taguchi with the Orix Buffaloes
- Outfielder / Coach
- Born: July 2, 1969 (age 57); Nishinomiya, Japan
- Batted: Right Threw: Right

Professional debut
- NPB: April 4, 1992, for the Orix BlueWave
- MLB: June 10, 2002, for the St. Louis Cardinals

Last appearance
- MLB: October 4, 2009, for the Chicago Cubs
- NPB: August 27, 2011, for the Orix Buffaloes

NPB statistics
- Batting average: .276
- Home runs: 70
- Runs batted in: 429

MLB statistics
- Batting average: .279
- Home runs: 19
- Runs batted in: 163
- Stats at Baseball Reference

Teams
- As player: Orix BlueWave (1992–2001); St. Louis Cardinals (2002–2007); Philadelphia Phillies (2008); Chicago Cubs (2009); Orix Buffaloes (2010–2011); As coach: Orix Buffaloes (2016–2024)

Career highlights and awards
- 2× World Series champion (2006, 2008); 2× Japan Series champion (1996, 2022)

So Taguchi (田口 壮, Taguchi Sō; born July 2, 1969) is a Japanese former professional baseball outfielder. He played in Nippon Professional Baseball (NPB) for the Orix BlueWave / Buffaloes, and in Major League Baseball (MLB) with the St. Louis Cardinals, Philadelphia Phillies, and Chicago Cubs.

Taguchi is the third Japanese-born player to win a World Series after Hideki Irabu in 1998 and Tadahito Iguchi in 2005. Taguchi is also the first Japanese player to win two World Series with different teams – with the St. Louis Cardinals in 2006 and the Philadelphia Phillies in 2008.

== Early life ==
Taguchi was born and raised in Nishinomiya, Hyōgo, Japan. He graduated from Kwansei Gakuin University in his hometown, with a Bachelor of Arts in Business Administration. He was a teammate of Ichiro Suzuki when the two played for the Orix BlueWave in the Pacific League of NPB. Although he was drafted by the BlueWave as an infielder, he was moved to the outfield later in his career.

== Career ==
=== St. Louis Cardinals (2002–2007) ===
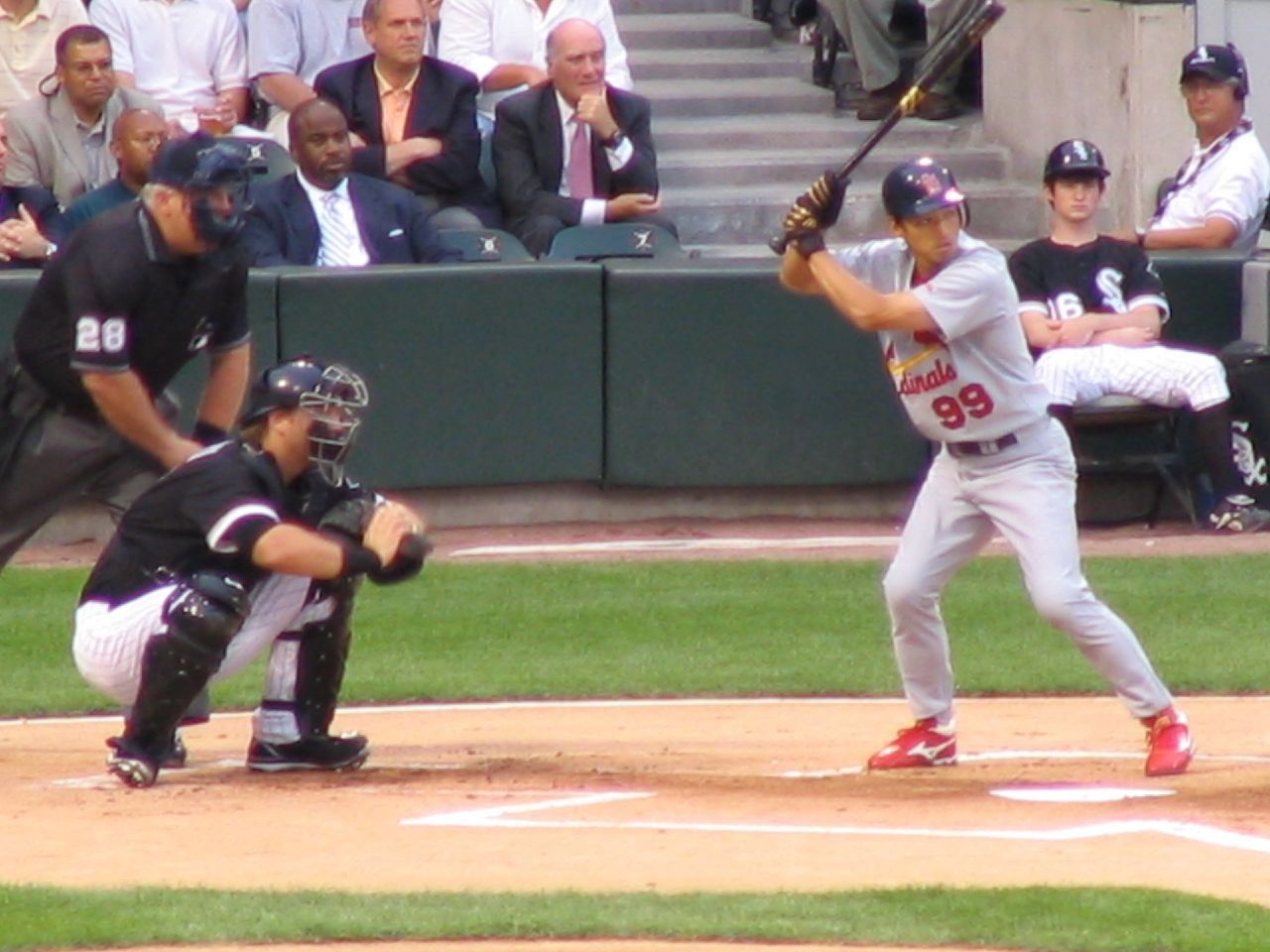
Taguchi with the St. Louis Cardinals.

He was signed by the St. Louis Cardinals as a free agent in 2002 at the age of 32, a year in which he rose through the minor league system, playing for the New Haven Ravens and the Memphis Redbirds, compiling a .262 batting average, with 6 home runs and 51 RBI. He eventually earned a call-up on September 7, and recorded the first hit of his major league career in the second inning against the Chicago Cubs. Taguchi became the first (and to date only) Japanese-born player in Cardinal history. He originally requested to wear the number 6, but he couldn't because it was retired for Stan Musial, nor could he turn 6 upside down because 9 was retired for Enos Slaughter. He could not wear the number he had at the Olympics because 1 was retired for Ozzie Smith. He was also unable to double 6 as Rick Ankiel was on the roster that year. Finally, he decided to wear 99.

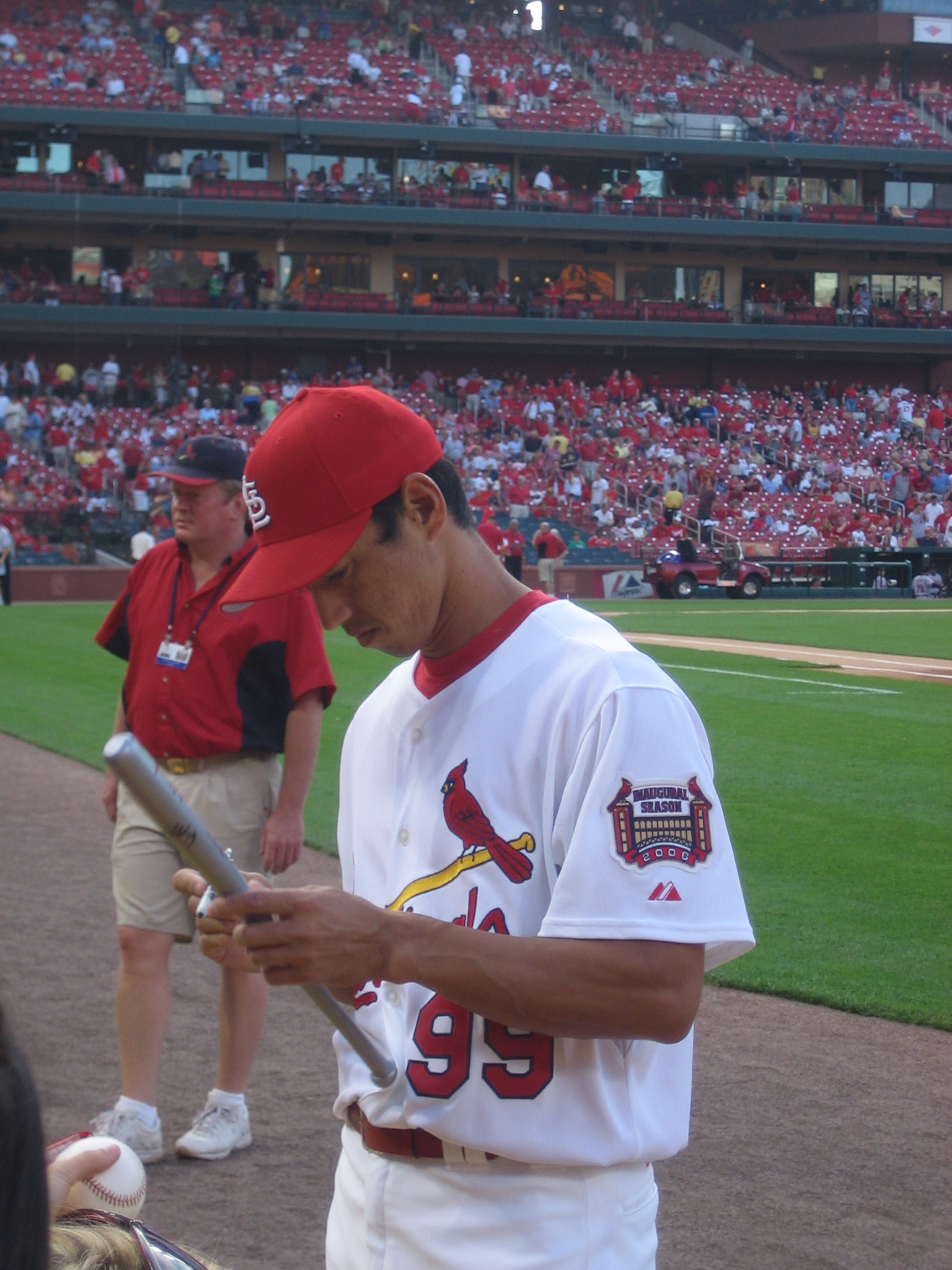
Taguchi signing autographs before a game against the Houston Astros on May 30, 2006.

Taguchi got another brief call-up in 2003, then got more playing time with the Cardinals in 2004, appearing in 109 games. He was included on the '04 Cardinals postseason roster, and appeared in two games of the 2004 World Series, which the Cardinals lost to the Boston Red Sox in a four-game sweep. In 2005, injuries to outfielders Larry Walker and Reggie Sanders opened up manager Tony La Russa's lineup card, and Taguchi became an everyday player. He responded with his best season, batting .288 in 396 at-bats with eight home runs and 53 RBI, and contributing with his stellar defense at all three outfield positions as the Cardinals won 100 games and had the best record in the National League.

Cardinal radio announcer Mike Shannon took to calling Taguchi "the So-man" and praising his hard work and extreme personal courtesy. By habit, Taguchi would even give a little bow to the umpire whenever he stepped up to the plate. His modest and happy demeanor, as well as shyness due to struggling with English in interviews early on, endeared him to St. Louis fans.

In 2006, Taguchi's playing time declined somewhat, his at-bat total falling to 316 from 396 the year before. However, Taguchi would make the playoff roster for the Cardinals for the third year in a row, and have a heroic postseason moment: on October 13, 2006, he hit the go-ahead home run off Billy Wagner in the top of the 9th inning of Game 2 of the NLCS. The home run gave the Cardinals a 7–6 lead in a game they would win 9–6. Taguchi played in four of five games of the 2006 World Series for the Cardinals, hitting .182, and won a World Series ring as the Cardinals defeated the Detroit Tigers four games to one. Taguchi agreed to a one-year deal worth $925,000 with the St. Louis Cardinals for the 2007 season.

Taguchi returned to the Cardinals in 2007 and had another solid season, batting .290 as a part-time player, with 307 at-bats in 130 games. He was one of manager Tony La Russa's most valuable pinch-hitters; of 46 games in 2007 where he's shown to have had just 1 AB, Taguchi picked up 15 hits. Taguchi played 617 innings in the field, with 41 starts (and 22 other appearances) in center (where Jim Edmonds was banged up) and 21 starts (20 other) in left (where the Cardinals hadn't settled on one player until 2008 and Skip Schumaker). Taguchi played sparingly in right field (2 starts, 6 other) and part of a game at 2B.

=== Philadelphia Phillies (2008) ===
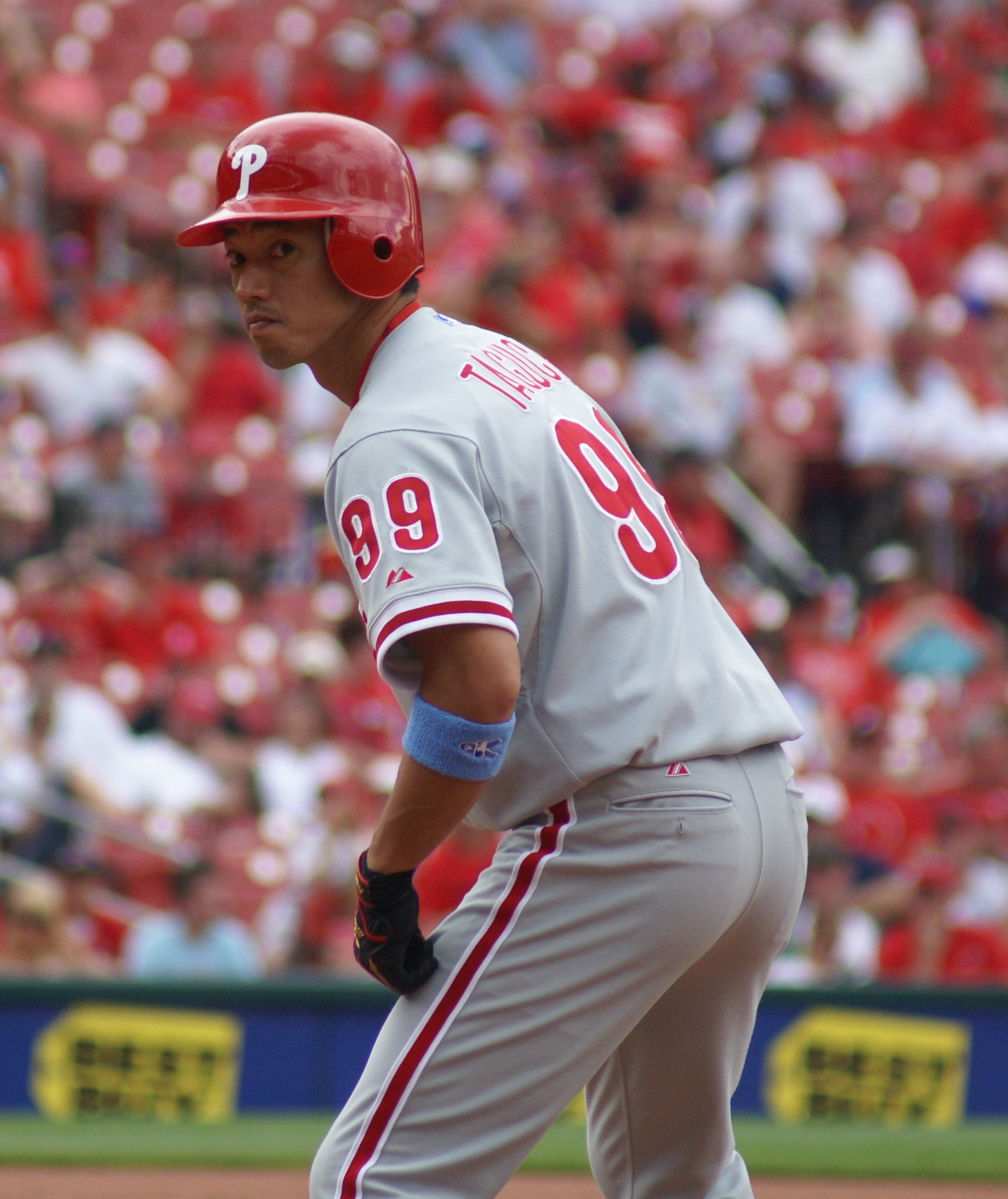
Taguchi with the Philadelphia Phillies

After the 2007 season ended, the Cardinals declined Taguchi's option for 2008, then decided to forgo arbitration and release Taguchi on December 5, 2007, after Taguchi's agent had requested his release earlier in the week.

On December 23, 2007, Taguchi was signed to a one-year deal by the Philadelphia Phillies with an option for 2009. Taguchi's numbers fell off sharply, his batting average dropping from .290 in 2007 to .220 in 2008, and he got only 91 at-bats for the whole season. However, he was included on Philadelphia's postseason roster and won his second championship ring when the Phillies won the 2008 World Series. (Taguchi was 0-for-4 pinch-hitting in the NLCS and did not appear in the World Series.)

Shortly after winning the World Series, the Phillies decided to decline Taguchi's option and make him a free agent.

=== Chicago Cubs (2009) ===
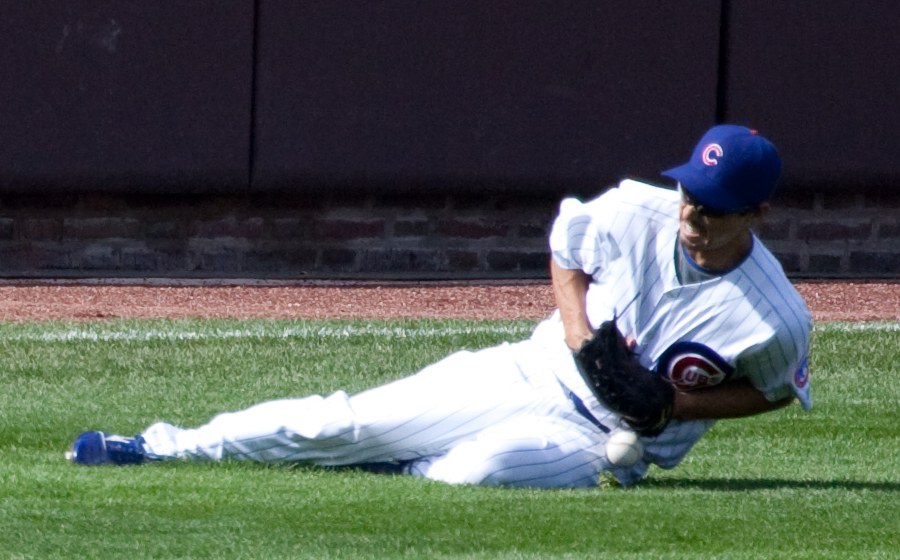
Taguchi with the Chicago Cubs.

Taguchi agreed to a minor league contract with the Chicago Cubs for the 2009 season, and was invited to spring training. Taguchi was signed in part to provide a Japanese teammate for Cubs outfielder Kosuke Fukudome. Taguchi did not make the Cubs roster and was optioned to Triple-A. After spending most of the season in the minors, Taguchi, who hit .248 with four home runs and 24 RBI in 85 games in the minors, was called up to the Cubs on September 16, 2009, replacing the injured Sam Fuld. He appeared in 12 games and got three hits in 11 at-bats.

=== Orix Buffaloes (2010–2011) ===
In January 2010 Taguchi's old team, the Orix BlueWave (since merged with the Kintetsu Buffaloes to form the Orix Buffaloes), announced that they had signed Taguchi to return and play for them in 2010.

On July 31, 2012, Taguchi announced his retirement on his official blog.

=== Baseball commentator ===
In September 2012, Taguchi embarked on a new career as a baseball commentator. By 2013, Taguchi was employed by Japanese broadcaster NHK to announce Major League Baseball games.

== Personal life ==
Taguchi learned English from his wife, Emiko, a former television reporter who speaks it fluently. He also practiced by watching films such as Finding Nemo and Monsters, Inc. The family still owns a home in St. Louis.

The couple has one son, Kan, who was born December 24, 2003. He is a member of the baseball team at Grand Canyon University in Phoenix, Arizona.
