= Josh Hancock =

American baseball player (1978–2007)

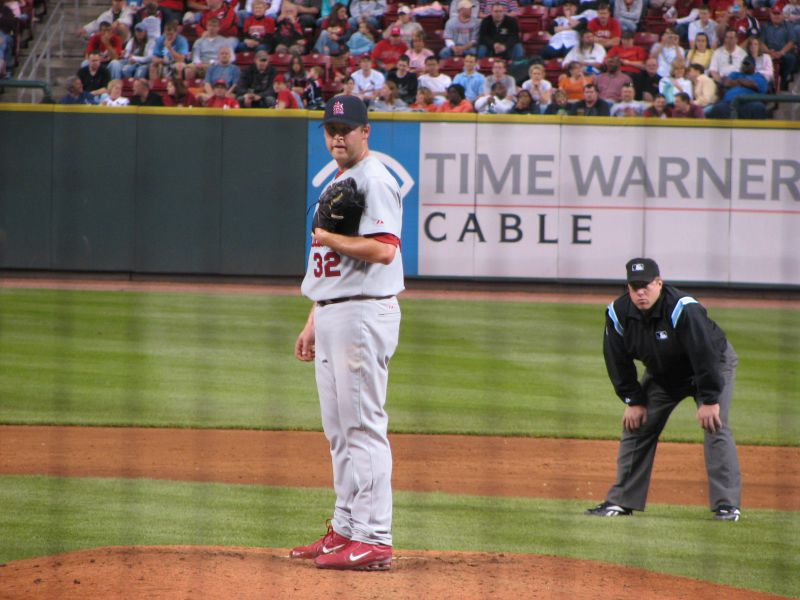
- Hancock with the Cardinals in May 2006
- Pitcher
- Born: April 11, 1978; Cleveland, Mississippi, U.S.
- Died: April 29, 2007 (aged 29); St. Louis, Missouri, U.S.
- Batted: Right Threw: Right

MLB debut
- September 10, 2002, for the Boston Red Sox

Last MLB appearance
- April 28, 2007, for the St. Louis Cardinals

MLB statistics
- Win–loss record: 9–7
- Earned run average: 4.20
- Strikeouts: 110
- Stats at Baseball Reference

Teams
- Boston Red Sox (2002); Philadelphia Phillies (2003–2004); Cincinnati Reds (2004–2005); St. Louis Cardinals (2006–2007)

Career highlights and awards
- World Series champion (2006)

Joshua Morgan Hancock (April 11, 1978 – April 29, 2007) was an American professional baseball pitcher, who played Major League Baseball (MLB) for the Boston Red Sox, Philadelphia Phillies, Cincinnati Reds, and St. Louis Cardinals. He was killed in an auto accident on April 29, 2007, at the age of 29.

== Career ==
Born in Cleveland, Mississippi, Hancock graduated from Vestavia Hills High School in Vestavia Hills, Alabama. After high school, he was selected in the fourth round of the 1996 Major League Baseball draft by the Milwaukee Brewers, but did not sign. An Alabama fan, Hancock instead attended college at Auburn University in Auburn, Alabama, because the Tigers offered him a better scholarship. Hancock was selected by the Boston Red Sox in the fifth round (155th overall) of the 1998 amateur draft and signed with the Red Sox, making his major-league debut on September 10, 2002. In December 2002 Hancock was traded to the Philadelphia Phillies for Jeremy Giambi. On July 30, 2004, he was traded along with Andy Machado to the Cincinnati Reds for Todd Jones and Brad Correll. The next day, Hancock was the winning pitcher for the Reds in a game against the Houston Astros (a suspended game that began the day before while he was still with the Phillies).

On the first day of Spring training 2006, Hancock was released by the Reds for being 17 pounds overweight — thus, violating a clause in his contract. He promptly signed with the St. Louis Cardinals and had his best season, pitching 77 innings, compiling a 4.09 earned run average (ERA), and appearing in the 2006 postseason with the Cardinals. Hancock performed in a variety of roles for the Cardinals' bullpen, from short term relief appearances to less desirable roles when the game was out of hand.

Hancock was on the Cardinals roster for the 2006 World Series but did not pitch.

Before coming to the Cardinals, Hancock had a penchant for giving up home runs. He gave up 17 homers over 68 innings pitched in 2005. Hancock improved in 2006, giving up only nine over 77 innings. In 2007, he had pitched 8 games with an 0–1 record and a 3.55 ERA.

== Death ==
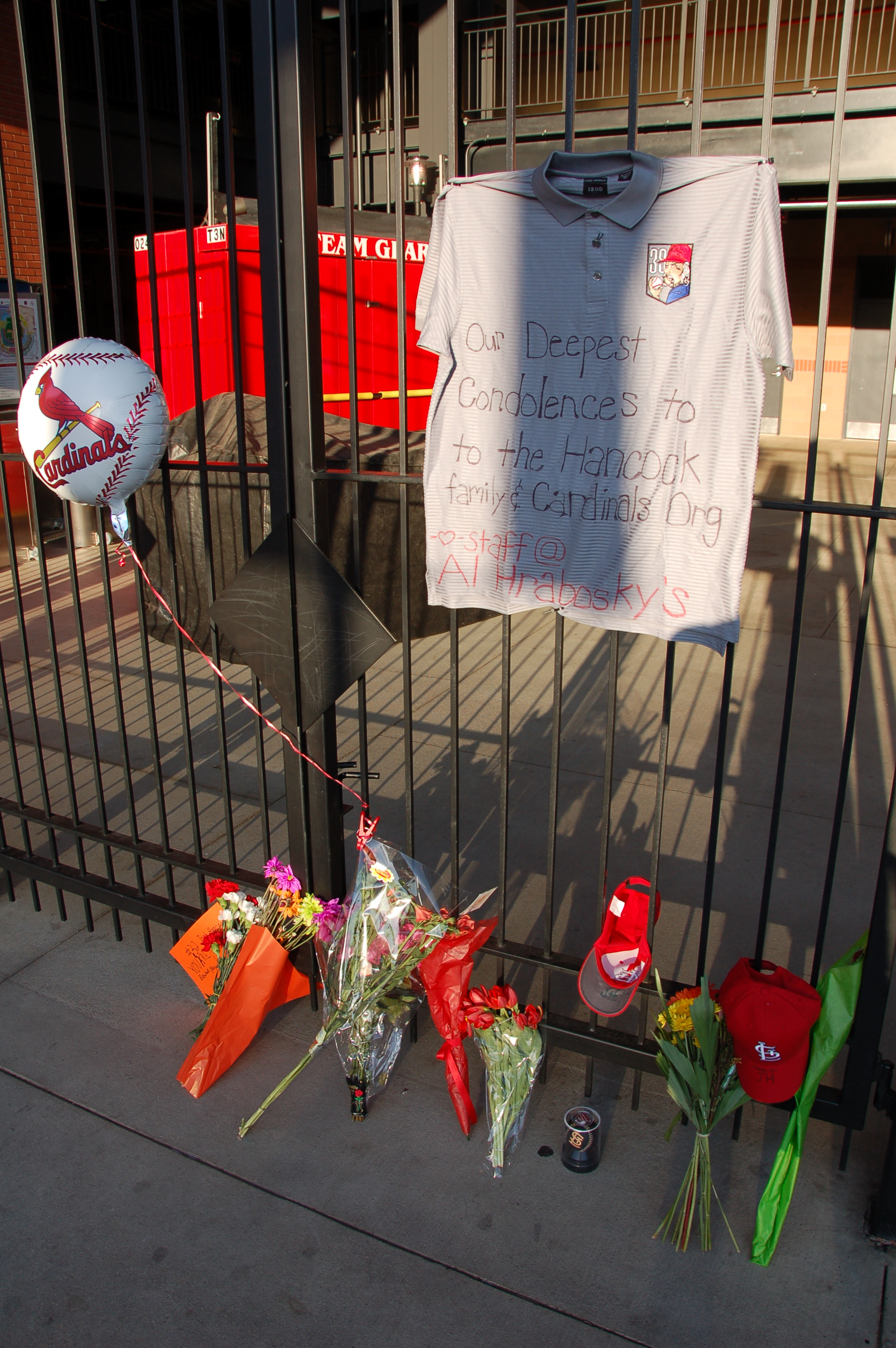
Shortly after his death, memorials sprang up outside Busch Stadium. At the above memorial, the staff of a bar owned by former Cardinals pitcher Al Hrabosky paid their respects to Hancock.

On April 29, 2007, Hancock was killed in a motor vehicle accident when the 2007 Ford Explorer he was driving while intoxicated struck the rear of a flat bed tow truck at 12:35 a.m. Central Time. The truck was reportedly in the left lane assisting another vehicle that was involved in a prior accident.

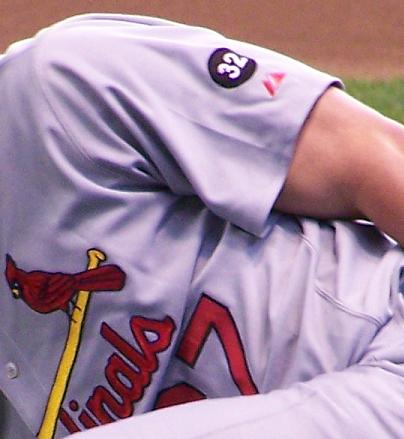
Memorial #32 patch worn by the St. Louis Cardinals during the 2007 season to honor Josh Hancock

A police report revealed that Hancock was intoxicated at the time of his fatal accident with a blood-alcohol level of 0.157, nearly double the legal limit in Missouri. Police found 10.95 grams of marijuana and a pipe in his vehicle, although toxicology reports revealed that there was no marijuana in his system. Hancock was texting on his cell phone when the accident occurred, and was not wearing a seatbelt. An accident reconstruction team determined that Hancock was driving 68 mph (109 km/h) in a 55 mph (89 km/h) zone.

The Cardinals' scheduled game with the Chicago Cubs later that day was postponed due to his accident. The game was eventually made up on September 15, a 3–2 Cubs victory.

Hancock's death marked the second time in five years a player for the Cardinals died during the baseball season, the first being of pitcher Darryl Kile in 2002 with a coronary artery blockage. Hancock was the second active MLB player to be killed in an accident in less than a year, after the plane crash of Yankees pitcher Cory Lidle.

Three days earlier, his teammates were concerned when they could not reach Hancock after he had overslept and had not shown up for the game on time, likening it to the events leading up to the sudden death of Kile. Hancock did not answer until the "20th call", having thought the start time was later than it actually was. Hancock was expected to be fined by the Cardinals after the incident.

On May 31, 2007, it was reported that Hancock had been involved in another accident involving his GMC Denali three nights before his fatal crash involving a rented Ford Explorer. Hancock's final appearance for the team was April 28, 2007, giving up one run in three innings of relief.

== Aftermath ==
The Cardinals wore a special patch on their uniform sleeves with Hancock's number (32) for the duration of the 2007 season to commemorate his life. Although his number is not retired, he is currently honored with his number being displayed above his name in the Cardinals bullpen at Busch Stadium, alongside Darryl Kile, who died in 2002.

In the wake of Hancock's accident, several teams banned alcohol from their home clubhouses. The Florida Marlins had already implemented this policy several seasons before Hancock's death, saying that they wanted to keep their players from driving home intoxicated after home games. They did not ban alcohol from visiting clubhouses because their opponents would usually ride a team bus after playing away games. In 2006, after Esteban Loaiza was arrested for drunk driving, Oakland A's GM Billy Beane banned alcohol in both clubhouses, saying it was a liability issue. After Hancock died, the Baltimore Orioles implemented a similar policy, at least on a temporary basis.

Hancock's family filed a lawsuit on May 24, 2007, against Mike Shannon's restaurant, the tow truck company, tow truck driver, and the driver of the car that the tow truck was stopped to help. On May 31, 2007, the Missouri Division of Alcohol and Tobacco Control announced results of an investigation revealed no wrongdoing on the part of employees at Mike Shannon's Steaks and Seafood restaurant in Hancock's death. The lawsuit was dropped on July 30, 2007.

== See also ==
- List of baseball players who died during their careers
- MLB.com tribute
- Sports E-Cyclopedia's Memorium to Josh Hancock
- PDF file of Dean Hancock's lawsuit
