= Brad Thompson =

American baseball player (born 1982)

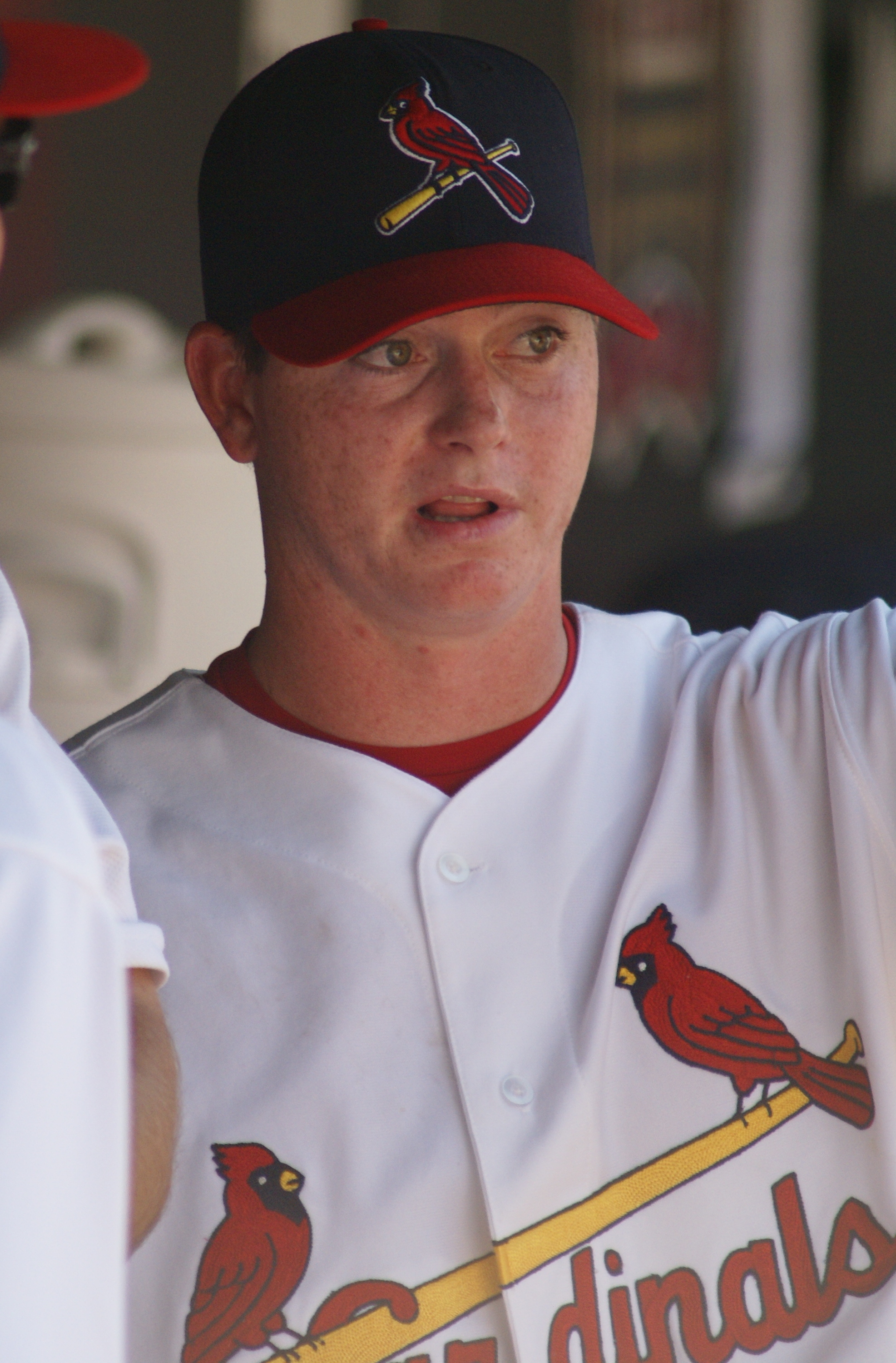
- Thompson with the St. Louis Cardinals in 2009
- Pitcher
- Born: January 31, 1982 (age 44); Las Vegas, Nevada, U.S.
- Batted: Right Threw: Right

MLB debut
- May 8, 2005, for the St. Louis Cardinals

Last MLB appearance
- June 2, 2010, for the Kansas City Royals

MLB statistics
- Win–loss record: 21-21
- Earned run average: 4.46
- Strikeouts: 485
- Stats at Baseball Reference

Teams
- St. Louis Cardinals (2005–2009); Kansas City Royals (2010)

Career highlights and awards
- World Series champion (2006)

Bradley Joseph Thompson (born January 31, 1982) is an American sports commentator and former professional baseball pitcher who is a telecast analyst for the St. Louis Cardinals of Major League Baseball (MLB). He played in MLB for the Cardinals and Kansas City Royals from 2005 to 2010, winning the World Series in 2006.

== Career ==
Thompson was drafted by the St. Louis Cardinals in the 16th round of the 2002 amateur draft out of Dixie State College. He holds the AA single-season scoreless innings streak. He made his major league debut on May 8, 2005. In his rookie season, he had 40 appearances and a 2.95 ERA in 55 innings pitched. On July 3, 2006, Thompson was sent down to the Cardinals' AAA affiliate, the Memphis Redbirds.

In 2007, Thompson, who had been in and out of the Cardinals' starting rotation, finished with an 8–6 record and a 4.73 ERA to go with 53 strikeouts. In 2008, he pitched 6.2 scoreless innings and picked up the win in his first start. He was then optioned to Memphis on April 23, 2008, then released on November 4, 2009.

Thompson signed with the Kansas City Royals for the 2010 season but was released on June 3 when he chose to become a free agent after he was designated for assignment. He then signed with the Houston Astros but was released in August.

He was injured for the 2011 season and played winter baseball in the Dominican Republic to get ready for the 2012 season.

The Minnesota Twins signed him to a minor league contract on January 19, 2012; he pitched for their AAA affiliate, The Rochester Red Wings.

Thompson formerly co-hosted The Fast Lane, a sports radio show in St. Louis, on 101 ESPN with Anthony Stalter and Jamie Rivers and currently serves as color commentator and analyst for Cardinals broadcasts on MLB TV.

== Personal life ==
Thompson married his wife, Andrea Kotys Thompson, in 2008. They reside near St. Louis, Missouri with their son and daughter.
