= 2008 Washington Nationals season =

2008 Washington Nationals
- League: National League
- Division: East
- Ballpark: Nationals Park
- City: Washington, D.C.
- Owners: Lerner Enterprises
- General managers: Jim Bowden
- Managers: Manny Acta
- Television: MASN; WDCA (My 20)
- Radio: WWWT

The Washington Nationals' 2008 season was the fourth season for the franchise in the District of Columbia, and the 40th since the original team was started in Montreal, Quebec, in 1969. It also marked the first season the Nationals played at Nationals Park. The team finished in last place in the National League East with a record of 59–102, the worst record in Major League Baseball.

== Offseason ==
On November 30, 2007, the Nationals traded Ryan Church and Brian Schneider to the New York Mets for Lastings Milledge. On December 3, 2007, they traded minor-leaguer Glenn Gibson to the Tampa Bay Devil Rays for Elijah Dukes, and on the following day they traded Jonathan Albaladejo to the New York Yankees for Tyler Clippard.

== Advertising and marketing ==
The Nationals′ marketing slogan for 2008 was "Welcome Home." The slogan welcomed Nationals fans to their new "home" at Nationals Park, where the Nationals began play in 2008 after three seasons at Robert F. Kennedy Memorial Stadium.

== Spring training ==
The Nationals held their 2008 spring training in Viera, Florida, with home games played at Space Coast Stadium.

== Regular season ==
=== March ===
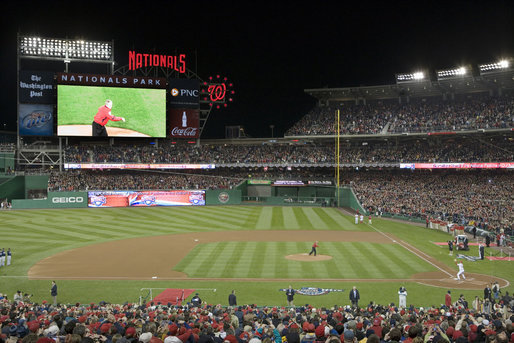
President George W. Bush throws the ceremonial first pitch before a sold-out crowd at the Washington Nationals' season opener on March 30, 2008

The Nationals opened the 2008 MLB season by hosting the Atlanta Braves in a nationally televised night game on March 30, 2008. It was the first professional regular-season game to be played at the Nationals' new facility Nationals Park. President George W. Bush threw the ceremonial first pitch to Nationals' manager Manny Acta, and Ryan Zimmerman hit a two-out, walk-off home run in the bottom of the ninth inning to mark an exciting beginning to the 2008 season. The Nationals also blew out the Phillies 11-6.

=== April ===
The Nationals clinched the series against the Phillies, winning 1-0. However, the Nationals struggled after a promising 3–0 start, losing 16 of their next 19 games to start off 6-16. They improved for the rest of the month, earning splits at Atlanta and at home against the Mets, and winning series against the Braves and the Pirates. Pope Benedict XVI celebrated Mass at Nationals Park in front of 47,000 people on April 17 while the Nationals were on a road trip.

=== May ===
The Nats started May winning 3 of the first 4 games of the month, earning them a 14–18 record, but lost 2 of 3 at Houston and were swept by the Florida Marlins at home. Then they took 3 of 4 against the struggling Mets at Shea Stadium, but in the first Beltway Series of 2008 they were nipped by the Orioles at Baltimore and lost two of three against the high-powered Phillies' offense. They split a series two games apiece against the Brewers and lost a series to the Padres. The Nats then beat up on the Diamondbacks in the first game of a series.

=== September ===
The team finished 59-102, the worst record in Major League Baseball. Six of the team's coaches were dismissed the day before the final game (a loss to the 2008 World Series champion Philadelphia Phillies); only manager Manny Acta and pitching coach Randy St. Clair were retained.

=== Season standings ===
NL East
Team	W	L	Pct.	GB	Home	Road
Philadelphia Phillies	92	70	.568	—	48‍–‍33	44‍–‍37
New York Mets	89	73	.549	3	48‍–‍33	41‍–‍40
Florida Marlins	84	77	.522	7½	45‍–‍36	39‍–‍41
Atlanta Braves	72	90	.444	20	43‍–‍38	29‍–‍52
Washington Nationals	59	102	.366	32½	34‍–‍46	25‍–‍56

=== Record vs. opponents ===
2008 National League record Source: MLB Standings Grid – 2008
Team	AZ	ATL	CHC	CIN	COL	FLA	HOU	LAD	MIL	NYM	PHI	PIT	SD	SF	STL	WAS	AL
Arizona	–	3–5	2–4	2–4	15–3	2–7	4–2	8–10	2–5	3–3	3–4	4–3	10–8	11–7	3–4	4–2	6–9
Atlanta	5–3	–	0–6	3–3	4–3	10–8	3–3	4–2	3–6	11–7	4–14	2–5	5–1	2–5	2–5	6–12	8–7
Chicago	4–2	6–0	–	8–7	5–1	4–3	8–9	5–2	9–7	4–2	3–4	14–4	5–2	4–3	9–6	3–3	6–9
Cincinnati	4–2	3–3	7–8	–	1–5	6–2	3–12	1–7	10–8	3–4	3–5	6–9	4–3	5–1	5–10	4–3	9–6
Colorado	3–15	3–4	1–5	5–1	–	5–3	3–3	8–10	4–3	3–6	0–5	5–2	9–9	11–7	3–4	4–3	7–8
Florida	7–2	8–10	3–4	2–6	3–5	–	4–2	3–4	5–1	8–10	10–8	3–2	4–2	3–3	2–5	14–3	5–10
Houston	2–4	3–3	9–8	12–3	3–3	2–4	–	4–3	7–8	5–2	3–4	8–8	3–3	7–1	7–8	4–2	7–11
Los Angeles	10–8	2–4	2–5	7–1	10–8	4–3	3–4	–	4–2	3–4	4–4	5–2	11–7	9–9	2–4	3–3	5–10
Milwaukee	5–2	6–3	7–9	8–10	3–4	1–5	8–7	2–4	–	2–4	1–5	14–1	4–3	6–0	10–5	6–2	7–8
New York	3–3	7–11	2–4	4–3	6–3	10–8	2–5	4–3	4–2	–	11–7	4–3	2–5	5–1	4–3	12–6	9–6
Philadelphia	4–3	14–4	4–3	5–3	5–0	8–10	4–3	4–4	5–1	7–11	–	4–2	4–2	3–3	5–4	12–6	4–11
Pittsburgh	3–4	5–2	4–14	9–6	2–5	2–3	8–8	2–5	1–14	3–4	2–4	–	3–4	4–2	10–7	3–4	6–9
San Diego	8–10	1–5	2–5	3–4	9–9	2–4	3–3	7–11	3–4	5–2	2–4	4–3	–	5–13	1–6	5–1	3–15
San Francisco	7–11	5–2	3–4	1–5	7–11	3–3	1–7	9–9	0–6	1–5	3–3	2–4	13–5	–	4–3	7–0	6–12
St. Louis	4–3	5–2	6–9	10–5	4–3	5–2	8–7	4–2	5–10	3–4	4–5	7–10	6–1	3–4	–	5–1	7–8
Washington	2–4	12–6	3–3	3–4	3–4	3–14	2–4	3–3	2–6	6–12	6–12	4–3	1–5	0–7	1–5	–	8–10

Nationals vs. American League
Team	AL Central				
Team	BAL	LAA	MIN	SEA	TEX
Washington	3—3	1—2	0—3	3—0	1–2

=== Opening Day lineup ===
Opening Day Starters
Name	Position
Cristian Guzmán	Shortstop
Lastings Milledge	Center fielder
Ryan Zimmerman	Third baseman
Nick Johnson	First baseman
Austin Kearns	Right fielder
Paul Lo Duca	Catcher
Elijah Dukes	Left fielder
Ronnie Belliard	Second baseman
Odalis Pérez	Starting pitcher

=== Notable transactions ===
- July 22, 2008: The Nationals traded Jon Rauch to the Arizona Diamondbacks for Emilio Bonifacio.
- July 31, 2008: The Nationals traded Jhonny Núñez to the New York Yankees for Alberto González.
- August 17, 2008: The Nationals traded Luis Ayala to the New York Mets for a player to be named later. The Mets sent Anderson Hernández to the Nationals to complete the trade on August 20, 2008.

=== Draft ===
The 2008 Major League Baseball draft took place on June 5 and 6. With their first pick – the ninth pick overall – the Nationals selected pitcher Aaron Crow. Other notable players the Nationals selected were shortstop Danny Espinosa (third round, 87th overall), catcher Adrián Nieto (fifth round, 151st overall), pitcher Tommy Milone (10th round, 301st overall), pitcher Louis Coleman (14th round, 421st overall), first baseman Tyler Moore (16th round, 481st overall), shortstop Steve Lombardozzi Jr. (19th round, 571st overall), pitcher Cory Mazzoni (26th round, 781st overall), pitcher Chris Heston (29th round, 871st overall), catcher Rob Brantly (46th round, 1,378th overall), and outfielder Alex Dickerson (48th round, 1,432nd overall). Crow, Coleman, Mazzoni, Heston, Brantly, and Dickerson all opted not to sign with the team. Moore finally did sign with the Nationals; it was the third time they had drafted him, but he had opted not to sign with them the first two times (in 2005 and 2006).

=== Roster ===
2008 Washington Nationals
Roster
Pitchers: 56 Luis Ayala; 40 Collin Balester; 57 Jason Bergmann; 47 Matt Chico; 19 Tyler Clippard; 43 Jesús Colomé; 32 Chad Cordero; 55 Marco Estrada; 38 Joel Hanrahan; 41 Shawn Hill; 58 Mike Hinckley; 36 Ray King; 31 John Lannan; 36 Charlie Manning; 51 Shairon Martis; 50 Garrett Mock; 54 Mike O'Connor; 49,45 Odalis Pérez; 51 Jon Rauch; 17 Tim Redding; 52 Saúl Rivera; 22 Brian Sanches; 45,49 Chris Schroder; 59 Steven Shell; 37 Levale Speigner	Catchers: 23 Johnny Estrada; 3 Jesús Flores; 16 Paul Lo Duca; 23 Luke Montz; 53 Wil Nieves; Infielders: 10 Ronnie Belliard; 6,7 Emilio Bonifacio; 8 Aaron Boone; 5 Kory Casto; 12 Alberto González; 15 Cristian Guzmán; 6 Anderson Hernández; 24 Nick Johnson; 2 Felipe López; 4 Pete Orr; 21 Dmitri Young; 11 Ryan Zimmerman; Outfielders: 7,2 Roger Bernadina; 34 Elijah Dukes; 1 Willie Harris; 25 Austin Kearns; 29 Ryan Langerhans; 12 Rob Mackowiak; 44 Lastings Milledge; 26 Wily Mo Peña	Manager: 14 Manny Acta; Coaches: 27 Rick Aponte (bullpen); 39 Pat Corrales (bench); 9 Lenny Harris (hitting); 28 Jerry Morales (first base); 46 Randy St. Claire (pitching); 18 Tim Tolman (third base)

=== Attendance ===
The Nationals drew 2,320,400 fans at Nationals Park in 2008, placing them 13th in attendance for the season among the 16 National League teams. Boosted by the opening of Nationals Park at the beginning of the season, it was their second-best attendance total in their short history in Washington, exceeded only by the 2,731,993 they drew in 2005, their first season in Washington.

=== Game log ===
2008 game log
March (2–0)

#	Date	Opponent	Score	Win	Loss	Save	Attendance	Record
1	March 30	Braves	3–2	Rauch (1–0)	Moylan (0–1)		39,389	1–0
2	March 31	@ Phillies	11–6	Rivera (1–0)	Gordon (0–1)		44,553	2–0

April (9–17)

#	Date	Opponent	Score	Win	Loss	Save	Attendance	Record
3	April 2	@ Phillies	1–0	Redding (1–0)	Hamels (0–1)	Rauch (1)	44,986	3–0
4	April 3	@ Phillies	8–7 (10)	Condrey (1–0)	Colomé (0–1)		25,831	3–1
5	April 4	@ Cardinals	5–4	Looper (1-0)	Pérez (0–1)	Isringhausen (2)	37,191	3–2
6	April 5	@ Cardinals	5–4	Wainwright (1–0)	Chico (0–1)	Flores (1)	41,463	3–3
7	April 6	@ Cardinals	3–0	Lohse (1–0)	Lannan (0–1)	Isringhausen (3)	41,912	3–4
8	April 7	Marlins	10–7	Pinto (1–0)	Redding (1–1)		20,487	3–5
9	April 9	Marlins	10–4	Olsen (1–0)	Bergmann (0–1)		23,340	3–6
10	April 10	Marlins	4–3	Hendrickson (2–1)	Pérez (0–2)	Gregg (2)	24,549	3–7
11	April 11	Braves	3–0	Hudson (2–0)	Chico (0–2)	Moylan (1)	28,051	3–8
12	April 12	Braves	10–2	Smoltz (2–0)	Lannan (0–2)		32,532	3–9
13	April 13	Braves	5–4	Redding (2–1)	Glavine (0–1)	Rauch (2)	29,151	4–9
14	April 15	@ Mets	6–0	Pelfrey (2–0)	Pérez (0–3)		46,567	4–10
15	April 16	@ Mets	5–2	Maine (1–1)	Chico (0–3)	Wagner (2)	46,106	4–11
16	April 17	@ Mets	3–2 (14)	Sosa (2–1)	Hanrahan (0–1)		47,785	4–12
17	April 18	@ Marlins	6–4	Redding (3–1)	J. Miller (1–1)	Rauch (3)	13,279	5–12
18	April 19	@ Marlins	6–5	Gregg (2–0)	Rivera (1–1)		18,944	5–13
19	April 20	@ Marlins	6–1	Olsen (3–0)	Ayala (0–1)		11,635	5–14
20	April 21	@ Braves	7–3	Hudson (3–1)	Chico (0–4)		16,706	5–15
21	April 22	@ Braves	6–0	Lannan (1–2)	Smoltz (3–1)		23,482	6–15
22	April 23	Mets	7–2	Santana (3–2)	Redding (3–2)		32,780	6–16
23	April 24	Mets	10–5	O'Connor (1–0)	Pérez (2–1)		29,750	7–16
24	April 25	Cubs	5–3	Rauch (2–0)	Howry (0–1)		35,154	8–16
25	April 26	Cubs	7–0	Zambrano (4–1)	Chico (0–5)		35,188	8–17
26	April 27	Cubs	2–0	Lannan (2–2)	Lilly (1–4)	Rauch (4)	33,795	9–17
27	April 29	Braves	6–3	Rivera (2–1)	Boyer (0–3)	Rauch (5)	25,285	10–17
28	April 30	Braves	3–2 (12)	Rivera (3–1)	Acosta (0–1)		29,473	11–17

May (13–16)

#	Date	Opponent	Score	Win	Loss	Save	Attendance	Record
29	May 1	Pirates	3–2	Ayala (1–1)	Grabow (1–1)	Rauch (6)	24,723	12–17
30	May 2	Pirates	11–4	Marte (2–0)	Lannan (2–3)		26,001	12–18
31	May 3	Pirates	9–8	Colomé (1–1)	Maholm (2–3)	Rauch (7)	34,128	13–18
32	May 4	Pirates	5–2	Redding (4–2)	Snell (2–2)		30,564	14–18
33	May 6	@ Astros	6–5	Brocail (2–0)	Ayala (1–2)	Valverde (7)	30,335	14–19
34	May 7	@ Astros	4–3	Valverde (4–1)	Hanrahan (0–2)		30,432	14–20
35	May 8	@ Astros	8–3	Lannan (3–3)	Backe (2–4)		33,433	15–20
36	May 9	Marlins	7–3	Nolasco (2–3)	Redding (4–3)		23,379	15–21
37	May 10	Marlins	11–0	A. Miller (3–2)	O'Connor (1–1)		28,663	15–22
38	May 11	Marlins	5–4	Kensing (2–0)	Ayala (1–3)	Gregg (7)	25,871	15–23
39	May 12	@ Mets	10–4	Pérez (1–3)	Figueroa (2–3)		45,321	16–23
40	May 13	@ Mets	6–3	Maine (5–2)	Lannan (3–4)	Wagner (8)	46,618	16–24
41	May 14	@ Mets	5–3	Redding (5–3)	Vargas (0–1)	Rauch (8)	48,529	17–24
42	May 15	@ Mets	1–0	Bergmann (1–1)	Pelfrey (2–4)	Rauch (9)	51,769	18–24
43	May 16	@ Orioles	5–3	Olson (3–0)	Hill (0–1)	Sherrill (16)	29,266	18–25
44	May 17	@ Orioles	6–5	Burres (4–4)	Pérez (1–4)	Sherrill (17)	32,662	18–26
45	May 18	@ Orioles	2–1	Lannan (4–4)	Guthrie (2–4)	Rauch (10)	33,745	19–26
46	May 19	Phillies	4–0	Redding (6–3)	Myers (2–5)		25,394	20–26
47	May 20	Phillies	1–0	Gordon (4–2)	Rauch (2–1)	Lidge (11)	28,105	20–27
48	May 21	Phillies	12–2	Moyer (4–3)	Chico (0–6)		28,055	20–28
49	May 23	Brewers	5–1	Sanches (1–0)	Suppan (2–4)		28,007	21–28
50	May 24	Brewers	5–2	McClung (2–1)	Lannan (4–5)	Torres (2)	30,029	21–29
51	May 25	Brewers	7–6	Rauch (3–1)	Mota (1–3)		35,567	22–29
52	May 26	Brewers	4–3 (11)	Villanueva (3–5)	Rivera (3–2)	Torres (3)	28,552	22–30
53	May 27	@ Padres	4–2	Bell (1–3)	Manning (0–1)	Hoffman (10)	18,744	22–31
54	May 28	@ Padres	6–4	Pérez (2–4)	Estes (1–1)	Rauch (11)	19,201	23–31
55	May 29	@ Padres	5–2	Bell (2–3)	Rivera (3–3)	Hoffman (11)	25,021	23–32
56	May 30	@ D-backs	7–4	Hanrahan (1–0)	Owings (6–3)	Rauch (12)	25,391	24–32
57	May 31	@ D-backs	4–0	Webb (10–2)	Bergmann (1–2)		38,507	24–33

June (9–18)

#	Date	Opponent	Score	Win	Loss	Save	Attendance	Record
58	June 1	@ D-backs	5–0	Haren (6–4)	Hill (0–2)		28,249	24–34
59	June 3	Cardinals	6–1	Lohse (6–2)	Pérez (2–5)		26,875	24–35
—	June 4	Cardinals	Postponed (rain) Rescheduled for June 5 as part of a doubleheader					
60	June 5 (1)	Cardinals	4–1	Wellemeyer (7–1)	Lannan (4–6)	Franklin (7)	27,264	24–36
61	June 5 (2)	Cardinals	10–9 (10)	Sanches (2–0)	Franklin (2–2)		32,357	25–36
62	June 6	Giants	10–1	Lincecum (8–1)	Bergmann (1–3)		25,987	25–37
63	June 7	Giants	6–0	Sánchez (5–3)	Hill (0–3)		30,652	25–38
64	June 8	Giants	6–3	Zito (2–9)	Mock (0–1)	Wilson (17)	30,224	25–39
65	June 9	Giants	3–2	Cain (3–4)	Clippard (0–1)	Wilson (18)	26,209	25–40
66	June 10	@ Pirates	7–6	Hanrahan (2–2)	Capps (0–1)	Rauch (13)	12,957	26–40
67	June 11	@ Pirates	3–1	Snell (3–6)	Lannan (4–7)	Capps (16)	15,439	26–41
68	June 12	@ Pirates	7–5	Gorzelanny (5–5)	Bergmann (1–4)	Marte (1)	16,306	26–42
69	June 13	@ Mariners	7–6	Hill (1–3)	Dickey (1–2)	Rauch (14)	35,941	27–42
70	June 14	@ Mariners	5–2	Clippard (1–1)	Batista (3–8)	Rauch (15)	32,145	28–42
71	June 15	@ Mariners	6–2	Colomé (2–1)	Lowe (1–3)		38,548	29–42
72	June 17	@ Twins	2–1	Hernández (7–4)	Lannan (4–8)	Nathan (18)	20,920	29–43
73	June 18	@ Twins	11–2	Slowey (4–6)	Bergmann (1–5)		23,841	29–44
74	June 19	@ Twins	9–3	Perkins (3–2)	Hill (1–4)		24,793	29–45
75	June 20	Rangers	4–3 (14)	Hanrahan (3–2)	Wright (4–3)		30,359	30–45
76	June 21	Rangers	13–3	Gabbard (2–3)	Mock (0–2)	Mendoza (1)	32,975	30–46
77	June 22	Rangers	5–3	Padilla (10–3)	Ayala (1–4)	Wilson (15)	32,690	30–47
78	June 23	Angels	3–2	Lackey (5–1)	Rivera (3–4)	Rodríguez (31)	24,805	30–48
79	June 24	Angels	8–3	Garland (7–4)	Hill (1–5)		28,531	30–49
80	June 25	Angels	5–4	Rauch (4–1)	Shields (3–2)		29,180	31–49
81	June 27	Orioles	4–2	Hanrahan (4–2)	Cabrera (5–4)	Rauch (16)	35,830	32–49
82	June 28	Orioles	9–1	Olson (6–3)	Lannan (4–9)	Cormier (1)	39,479	32–50
83	June 29	Orioles	3–2 (12)	Hanrahan (5–2)	Sherrill (2–3)		39,824	33–50
84	June 30	@ Marlins	6–5 (10)	Gregg (6–2)	Rauch (4–2)		10,888	33–51

July (5–19)

#	Date	Opponent	Score	Win	Loss	Save	Attendance	Record
85	July 1	@ Marlins	9–6	Balester (1–0)	Hendrickson (7–7)		12,166	34–51
86	July 2	@ Marlins	4–2	Nolasco (9–4)	Manning (0–2)		23,624	34–52
87	July 3	@ Reds	5–3	Cueto (7–8)	Colomé (2–2)	Cordero (16)	23,259	34–53
88	July 4	@ Reds	3–0	Arroyo (6–7)	Bergmann (1–6)	Cordero (17)	22,626	34–54
89	July 5	@ Reds	3–2	Cordero (4–1)	Hanrahan (5–3)		37,121	34–55
90	July 6	@ Reds	6–5	Vólquez (11–3)	Balester (1–1)	Cordero (18)	28,814	34–56
91	July 8	D-backs	2–0	Webb (13–4)	Pérez (2–6)	Lyon (19)	26,820	34–57
92	July 9	D-backs	5–0	Lannan (5–9)	Owings (6–8)		25,862	35–57
93	July 10	D-backs	7–5 (11)	Qualls (2–6)	Ayala (1–5)		27,330	35–58
94	July 11	Astros	10–0	Redding (7–3)	Paronto (0–1)	Shell (1)	33,653	36–58
95	July 12	Astros	6–4	Rodríguez (4–3)	Balester (1–2)	Valverde (24)	30,682	36–59
96	July 13	Astros	5–0	Backe (6–9)	Pérez (2–7)		31,463	36–60
All–Star Break (July 14–16)
97	July 18	@ Braves	7–6	Hudson (10–7)	Redding (7–4)	González (4)	39,861	36–61
98	July 19	@ Braves	8–2	Lannan (6–9)	Jurrjens (9–5)		43,285	37–61
99	July 20	@ Braves	15–6	Pérez (3–7)	Reyes (3–9)		29,320	38–61
100	July 22	@ Giants	6–3	Zito (5–12)	Bergmann (1–7)	Wilson (26)	34,813	38–62
101	July 23	@ Giants	6–4	Espineli (1–0)	Ayala (1–6)	Wilson (27)	35,539	38–63
102	July 24	@ Giants	1–0	Cain (6–8)	Redding (7–5)		36,963	38–64
103	July 25	@ Dodgers	3–2	Billingsley (10–9)	Lannan (6–10)	Broxton (3)	47,313	38–65
104	July 26	@ Dodgers	6–0	Lowe (8–8)	Pérez (3–8)		42,122	38–66
105	July 27	@ Dodgers	2–0	Kershaw (1–3)	Bergmann (1–8)	Broxton (4)	38,660	38–67
106	July 29	Phillies	2–1	Myers (4–9)	Balester (1–3)	Lidge (25)	34,039	38–68
107	July 30	Phillies	8–5	Moyer (10–6)	Redding (7–6)	Lidge (26)	31,798	38–69
108	July 31	Phillies	8–4	Kendrick (9–5)	Lannan (6–11)		31,658	38–70

August (14–15)

#	Date	Opponent	Score	Win	Loss	Save	Attendance	Record
109	August 1	Reds	5–2	Pérez (4–8)	Bailey (0–5)		30,572	39–70
110	August 2	Reds	10–6	Manning (1–2)	Lincoln (1–3)		30,970	40–70
111	August 3	Reds	4–2	Balester (2–3)	Cueto (7–11)	Hanrahan (1)	32,939	41–70
112	August 4	@ Rockies	9–4	Redding (8–6)	Cook (14–7)		33,143	42–70
113	August 5	@ Rockies	8–2	Corpas (2–3)	Ayala (1–7)		27,483	42–71
—	August 6	@ Rockies	Postponed (rain) Rescheduled for August 7 as part of a doubleheader					
114	August 7 (1)	@ Rockies	6–3	Bergmann (2–8)	Francis (3–8)	Hanrahan (2)	30,448	43–71
115	August 7 (2)	@ Rockies	6–3	Pérez (5–8)	Jiménez (8–10)	Hanrahan (3)	30,448	44–71
116	August 8	@ Brewers	5–0	Sabathia (6–0)	Balester (2–4)		43,209	44–72
117	August 9	@ Brewers	6–0	Sheets (11–5)	Redding (8–7)		42,974	44–73
118	August 10	@ Brewers	5–4	Mota (3–5) (13)	Ayala (1–8)		42,423	44–74
119	August 11	@ Brewers	7–1	Bush (7–9)	Mock (0–3)		42,196	44–75
120	August 12	Mets	4–3	Santana (10–7)	Rivera (3–5)	Feliciano (1)	32,186	44–76
121	August 13	Mets	12–0	Maine (10–7)	Bergmann (2–9)	Stokes (1)	30,814	44–77
122	August 14	Mets	9–3	Pérez (9–7)	Balester (2–5)		31,058	44–78
123	August 15	Rockies	4–3	de la Rosa (6–6)	Redding (8–8)	Fuentes (23)	27,965	44–79
124	August 16	Rockies	13–6	Hernández (1–1)	Lannan (6–12)		28,909	44–80
125	August 17	Rockies	7–2	Cook (15–8)	Pérez (5–9)		31,467	44–81
126	August 19	@ Phillies	5 – 4	Madson (3-1)	Shell (0-1)	Lidge (31)	44,143	44-82
127	August 20	@ Phillies	4 – 0	Myers (6-10)	Balester (2-6)		45,166	44-83
128	August 21	@ Phillies	4-3	Rivera (4-5)	Madson (3-2)	Hanrahan (4)	41,568	45-83
129	August 22	@ Cubs	13-5	Lannan (7-12)	Cotts (0-2)		40,513	46-83
130	August 23	@ Cubs	9-2	Dempster (15-5)	Pérez (5-10)		40,708	46-84
131	August 24	@ Cubs	6-1	Harden (9-2)	Bergmann (2-10)		40,682	46-85
132	August 26	Dodgers	2-1	Balester (3-6)	Derek Lowe	Hanrahan (5)	26,110	47-85
133	August 27	Dodgers	5-4	Redding (9-8)	Maddux (6-11)	Hanrahan (6)	22,907	48-85
134	August 28	Dodgers	11-2	Lannan (8-12)	Kershaw (2-5)		26,338	49-85
135	August 29	Braves	7-3	Pérez (6-10)	Campillo	Hanrahan	22,737	50-85
136	August 30	Braves	9-8	Shell (1-1)	V. Núñez (0-2)		30,326	51-85
137	August 31	Braves	8-4	Mock (1-3)	Elmer Dessens (0-1)		31,090	52-85

September (7–17)

#	Date	Opponent	Score	Win	Loss	Save	Attendance	Record
138	September 1	Phillies	7–4	Redding (10–8)	Kendrick (11–8)		28,393	53–85
139	September 2	Phillies	4–0	Hamels (12–8)	Lannan (8–13)		23,150	53–86
140	September 3	Phillies	9–7	Rivera (5–5)	C. Durbin (5–4)		23,122	54–86
141	September 4	@ Braves	2–0	Parr (1–0)	Martis (0–1)	Gonzalez (9)	18,708	54–87
142	September 5	@ Braves	10–5	Jurrjens (12–9)	Bergmann (2–11)		25,064	54–88
143	September 6	@ Braves	8–5 (10)	Hanrahan (6–3)	Gonzalez (0–2)	Shell (2)	34,369	55–88
144	September 7	@ Braves	7–4 (14)	Shell (2–1)	Bennett (2–6)	Hanrahan (8)	30,753	56–88
145	September 9	@ Mets	10–8	Smith (4–3)	Manning (1–3)	Ayala (6)	50,382	56–89
146	September 10	@ Mets	13–10	Smith (5–3)	Rivera (5–6)	Ayala (7)	52,431	56–90
147	September 12	@ Marlins	2–1	Olsen (7-10)	Martis (0-2)	Lindstrom (3)	12,121	56–91
148	September 13	@ Marlins	4–2	Johnson (5-1)	Redding (10-9)	Lindstrom (4)	16,307	56–92
149	September 14	@ Marlins	8–7	A. Miller (6-9)	Shell (2-2)	Rhodes (2)	12,024	56–93
150	September 15	Mets	7–2	Lannan (9–13)	P. Martínez (5–5)		21,759	57–93
151	September 16	Mets	1–0	Pérez (7–10)	Pelfrey (13–10)	Hanrahan (9)	24,997	58–93
152	September 17	Mets	9–7	Knight (1–0)	Martis (0–3)	Ayala (8)	25,019	58–94
153	September 18	Mets	7–2	Santana (14–7)	Redding (10–10)		25,426	58–95
154	September 19	Padres	11–6(14)	Hampson (2-1)	Speigner (0-1)		28,600	58-96
155	September 20	Padres	6–1	Young (6-6)	Lannan (9-14)		27,474	58-97
156	September 21	Padres	6–2	Baek (6-10)	Pérez (7-11)		29,608	58-98
157	September 23	Marlins	9–4	Martis (1-3)	Olsen (8-11)		20,657	59–98
158	September 24	Marlins	9–4	Johnson (7-1)	Redding (10-11)		23,299	59–99
--	September 25	Marlins	Cancelled (rain) No make-up game was scheduled					
159	September 26	@ Phillies	8–4	Blanton (9–12)	Balester (3–7)		44,145	59–100
160	September 27	@ Phillies	4–3	Moyer (16–7)	Lannan (9–15)	Lidge (41)	45,177	59–101
161	September 28	@ Phillies	8–3	Walrond (1–1)	Pérez (7–12)		44,945	59–102

== Player stats ==
=== Batting ===
Note: Pos = Position; G = Games played; AB = At bats; R = Runs scored; H = Hits; 2B = Doubles; 3B = Triples; HR = Home runs; RBI = Runs batted in; AVG = Batting average; SB = Stolen bases

Pos	Player	G	AB	R	H	2B	3B	HR	RBI	AVG	SB
LF	Willie Harris	140	367	28	92	14	4	13	43	.251	13
CF	Lastings Milledge	138	523	65	140	24	2	14	61	.268	24
SS	Cristian Guzmán	138	579	77	183	35	5	9	55	.316	6
3B	Ryan Zimmerman	106	428	51	121	24	1	14	51	.283	1
1B	Aaron Boone	104	232	23	56	13	1	6	28	.241	0
2B	Felipe López	100	325	34	76	20	0	2	25	.234	4
IF	Ronnie Belliard	96	296	37	85	22	0	11	46	.287	3
C	Jesus Flores	90	301	23	77	18	1	8	59	.256	0
RF	Austin Kearns	86	313	40	68	10	0	7	32	.217	2
RF	Elijah Dukes	81	276	48	73	16	2	13	44	.264	13
OF	Ryan Langerhans	73	111	17	26	5	2	3	12	.234	2
P	Saúl Rivera	72	1	0	0	0	0	0	0	.000	0
C	Wil Nieves	68	176	15	46	9	1	1	20	.261	0
CI	Kory Casto	66	163	15	35	10	0	2	16	.215	1
P	Joel Hanrahan	65	2	0	0	0	0	0	0	.000	0
LF	Wily Mo Pena	64	195	10	40	6	0	2	10	.205	0
P	Luis Ayala	60	1	0	0	0	0	0	0	.000	0
P	Jesús Colomé	58	0	0	0	0	0	0	0	–	0
P	Charlie Manning	56	0	0	0	0	0	0	0	–	0
1B	Dmitri Young	50	150	15	42	6	0	4	10	.280	0
UT	Pete Orr	49	75	10	19	2	1	0	7	.253	1
UT	Paul Lo Duca	46	139	13	32	7	0	0	12	.230	1
P	Jon Rauch	44	1	0	0	0	0	0	0	.000	0
2B	Emilio Bonifacio	41	157	26	39	5	5	0	12	.248	6
P	Steven Shell	39	4	0	0	0	0	0	0	.000	0
1B	Nick Johnson	38	109	15	24	8	0	5	20	.220	0
OF	Rob Mackowiak	38	53	7	7	1	0	1	4	.132	0
P	Tim Redding	34	47	2	8	1	0	0	3	.170	0
P	Odalis Perez	30	53	4	8	2	0	0	2	.151	0
P	John Lannan	29	45	0	1	0	0	0	0	.022	0
P	Jason Bergmann	29	40	0	0	0	0	0	0	.000	0
2B	Anderson Hernandez	28	81	11	27	4	0	0	17	.333	0
P	Garrett Mock	26	4	0	0	0	0	0	0	.000	0
OF	Roger Bernadina	26	76	10	16	1	1	0	2	.211	4
C	Johnny Estrada	23	53	0	9	0	0	0	4	.170	0
IF	Alberto González	17	49	9	17	6	0	1	9	.347	0
P	Collin Balester	15	15	1	3	0	0	0	1	.200	0
P	Mike Hinckley	14	0	0	0	0	0	0	0	–	0
P	Ray King	12	0	0	0	0	0	0	0	–	0
P	Marco Estrada	11	0	1	0	0	0	0	0	–	0
P	Matt Chico	10	13	2	2	0	0	0	0	.154	0
C	Luke Montz	10	21	2	3	0	0	1	3	.143	0
P	Brian Sanches	10	0	0	0	0	0	0	0	–	0
P	Shawn Hill	9	7	0	0	0	0	0	0	.000	0
P	Levale Speigner	7	0	0	0	0	0	0	0	–	0
P	Chad Cordero	6	0	0	0	0	0	0	0	–	0
P	Shairon Martis	5	7	0	0	0	0	0	0	.000	0
P	Michael O'Connor	5	2	0	0	0	0	0	0	.000	0
P	Chris Schroder	4	0	0	0	0	0	0	0	–	0
P	Tyler Clippard	1	1	0	1	0	0	0	0	1.000	0
	Team totals	161	5491	641	1376	269	26	117	608	.251	81

=== Pitching ===
Table is sortable.

Note: Pos = Position; W = Wins; L = Losses; ERA = Earned run average; G = Games pitched; GS = Games started; SV = Saves; IP = Innings pitched; H = Hits allowed; R = Runs allowed; ER = Earned runs allowed; BB = Walks allowed; K = Strikeouts

Pos	Player	W	L	ERA	G	GS	SV	IP	H	R	ER	BB	K
SP	Tim Redding	10	11	4.95	33	33	0	182.0	195	110	100	65	120
SP	John Lannan	9	15	3.91	31	31	0	182.0	172	89	79	72	117
SP	Odalis Perez	7	12	4.34	30	30	0	159.2	182	87	77	55	119
RP	Joel Hanrahan	6	3	3.95	69	0	9	84.1	73	40	37	42	93
RP	Saúl Rivera	5	6	3.96	76	0	0	84.0	90	41	37	35	65
CL	Jon Rauch	4	2	2.98	48	0	17	48.1	42	18	16	7	44
SP	Collin Balester	3	7	5.51	15	15	0	80.0	92	53	49	28	50
SP	Jason Bergmann	2	11	5.09	30	22	0	139.2	153	94	79	47	96
	Steven Shell	2	2	2.16	39	0	2	50.0	34	14	12	20	41
	Brian Sanches	2	0	7.36	12	0	0	11.1	16	10	9	5	10
RP	Jesús Colomé	2	2	4.31	61	0	0	71.0	61	38	34	39	55
	Tyler Clippard	1	1	4.35	2	2	0	10.1	12	5	5	7	8
	Charlie Manning	1	3	5.14	57	0	0	42.0	35	25	24	31	37
	Garrett Mock	1	3	4.17	26	3	0	41.0	37	20	19	23	46
	Shairon Martis	1	3	5.66	5	4	0	20.2	18	14	13	12	23
	Mike O'Connor	1	1	13.00	5	1	0	9.0	11	13	13	11	4
	Shawn Hill	1	5	5.83	12	12	0	63.1	88	47	41	23	39
RP	Luis Ayala	1	8	5.77	62	0	0	57.2	63	41	37	22	36
	Marco Estrada	0	0	7.82	11	0	0	12.2	17	13	11	5	10
	Ray King	0	0	5.68	12	0	0	6.1	9	4	4	4	1
	Levale Speigner	0	1	11.25	7	0	0	8.0	13	10	10	6	1
	Chris Schroder	0	0	5.4	4	0	0	5.0	6	3	3	6	3
	Matt Chico	0	6	6.19	11	8	0	48.0	63	34	34	17	31
	Chad Cordero	0	0	2.08	6	0	0	4.1	6	1	1	3	5
	Mike Hinckley	0	0	0.00	14	0	0	13.2	8	1	0	3	9
	Team totals	59	102	4.66	161	161	28	1434.0	1496	825	742	588	1063

=== Team leaders ===
Qualifying players only.

==== Batting ====
Stat	Player	Total
Avg.	Cristian Guzmán	.316
HR	Lastings Milledge; Ryan Zimmerman	14; 14
RBI	Lastings Milledge	61
R	Cristian Guzmán	77
H	Cristian Guzmán	183
SB	Lastings Milledge	24

==== Pitching ====
Stat	Player	Total
W	Tim Redding	10
L	John Lannan	15
ERA	John Lannan	3.91
SO	Tim Redding	120
SV	Jon Rauch	17
IP	John Lannan; Tim Redding	182.0; 182.0

== Awards and honors ==
=== All-Stars ===
- Cristian Guzmán, SS

== Washington's top 20 prospects ==
1. Chris Marrero, 1B/OF
2. Ross Detwiler, LHP
3. Collin Balester, RHP
4. Michael Burgess, OF
5. Jack McGeary, LHP
6. Josh Smoker, LHP
7. Jordan Zimmermann, RHP
8. Justin Maxwell, OF
9. Colton Willems, RHP
10. John Lannan, LHP
11. Jake Smolinski, OF
12. Tyler Clippard, RHP
13. Adam Carr, RHP
14. Ian Desmond, SS
15. Garrett Mock, RHP
16. Stephen King, SS
17. Esmailyn Gonzalez, SS
18. Shairon Martis, RHP
19. Brad Peacock, RHP
20. Kory Casto, OF/3B

== Farm system ==
Level	Team	League	Manager
AAA	Columbus Clippers	International League	Tim Foli
AA	Harrisburg Senators	Eastern League	John Stearns
A	Potomac Nationals	Carolina League	Randy Knorr
A	Hagerstown Suns	South Atlantic League	Darnell Coles
A-Short Season	Vermont Lake Monsters	New York–Penn League	Ramón Avilés
Rookie	GCL Nationals	Gulf Coast League	Bob Henley

LEAGUE CHAMPIONS: Potomac
