= Collin Balester =

American baseball player (born 1986)

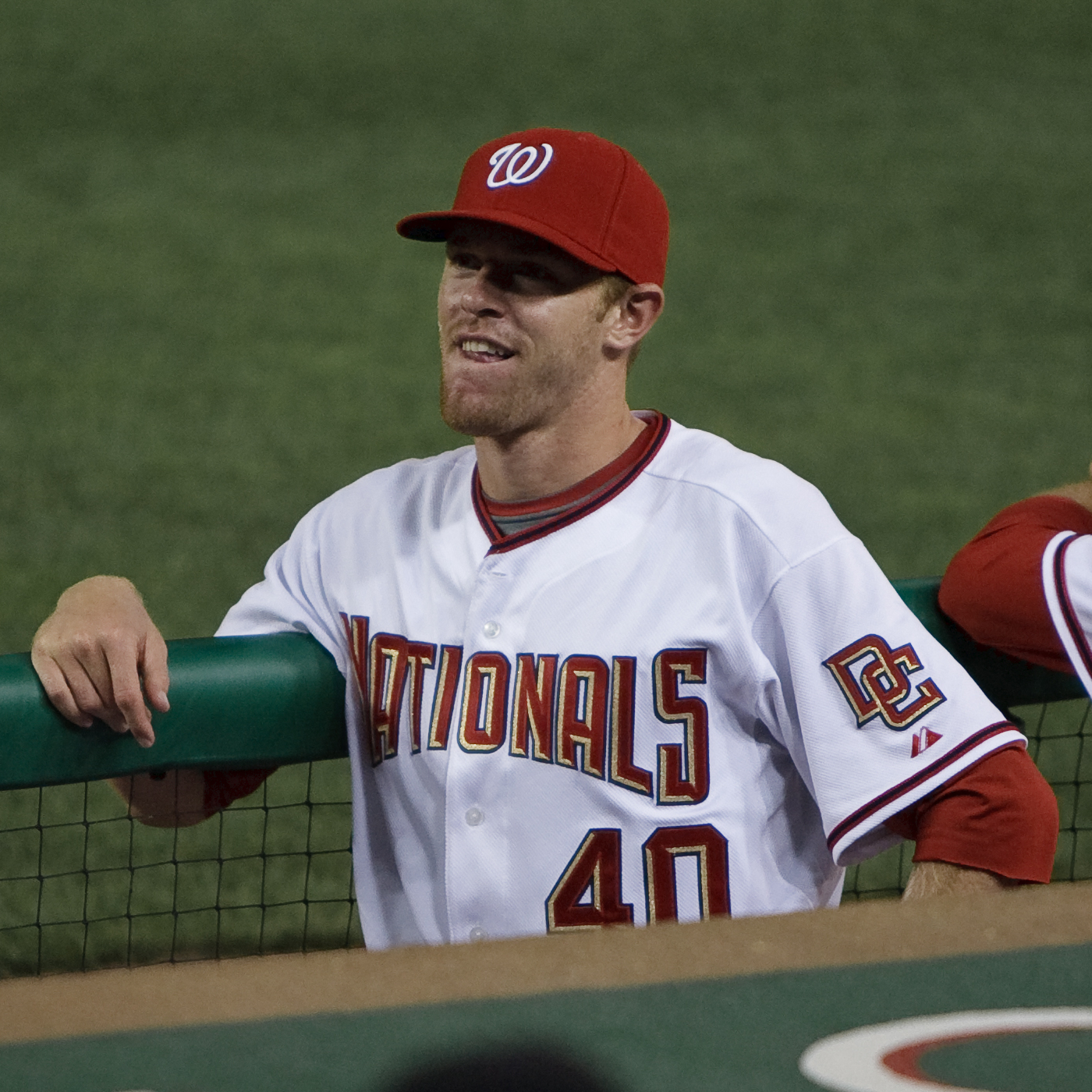
- Balester with the Washington Nationals
- Pitcher
- Born: June 6, 1986 (age 39); Huntington Beach, California, U.S.
- Batted: Right Threw: Right

Professional debut
- MLB: July 1, 2008, for the Washington Nationals
- KBO: April 5, 2016, for the Samsung Lions

Last appearance
- MLB: October 2, 2015, for the Cincinnati Reds
- KBO: April 15, 2016, for the Samsung Lions

MLB statistics
- Win–loss record: 8–17
- Earned run average: 5.47
- Strikeouts: 157

KBO statistics
- Win–loss record: 0–3
- Earned run average: 8.03
- Strikeouts: 5
- Stats at Baseball Reference

Teams
- Washington Nationals (2008–2011); Detroit Tigers (2012); Cincinnati Reds (2015); Samsung Lions (2016)

Collin Thomas Balester (born June 6, 1986) is an American former professional baseball player. A pitcher, he played in Major League Baseball (MLB) from 2008 to 2015 for the Washington Nationals, Detroit Tigers, and Cincinnati Reds. Balester also played in the KBO League for the Samsung Lions.

Balester grew up in Huntington Beach, California, the son of a surfboard maker. He was drafted by the Montreal Expos in 2004, making his professional debut that year. By 2007, he was considered a top prospect for the newly relocated Nationals, with him participating in that season's All-Star Futures Game. On July 1, 2008, he made his MLB debut with the Nationals. He won his debut as a starter, becoming the first Expo or National to do so since 1999. That season, he went on to make 14 starts for Washington, recording a 5.51 earned run average (ERA). In 2009, Balester split the year between the Triple-A Syracuse Chiefs and Washington, making a combined 27 starts. Balester was converted into a relief pitcher in 2010, after struggling with Syracuse at the beginning of the year. In both 2010 and 2011, he would continue to split time between Syracuse and Washington. The Nationals traded Balester to Detroit on December 9, 2011, for pitcher Ryan Perry.

In 2012, Balester started the season on a major league roster for the first time in his career but was designated for assignment in May. Signed to a minor league deal by the Texas Rangers in 2013, he underwent Tommy John surgery midway through the year. It was not until 2015 that he would pitch in the major leagues again, this time for the Reds, with whom he had a 7.47 ERA. He made three starts for the Lions in Korea in 2016 before elbow pain led to his release. After one final professional season in 2017, he and his wife started the Local Roots Juice Co. in Perrysburg, Ohio.

== Early life ==
Collin Thomas Balester was born on June 6, 1986, in Huntington Beach, California, the son of Tom and Sally Balester. He has two sisters, Lauren (older) and Jenna (younger). His father runs a surfboard shop off of Slater Avenue in Huntington Beach and also makes "Balestar" surfboards, which are sold widely in surf shops. Collin surfed regularly growing up. Playing Little League Baseball for the Huntington Valley team, Balester threw a pitch that was recorded at 83 miles per hour (134 km/h), making his father realize that his son might be a major league prospect one day.

At Huntington Beach High School, his velocity had gone down during his senior year, and scouts were saying he might be better off going to college. Balester worked on throwing harder, responding with multiple shutouts towards the end of the season. In his last year at Huntington Beach, he had a 6–4 record and a 1.63 earned run average (ERA), striking out 63 batters in 64 innings pitched. Baseball America was only mildly impressed with his performance, stating that he "didn't dominate".

== Professional career ==
=== Washington Nationals ===
==== 2004–2007 ====
Balester was drafted by the Montreal Expos in the fourth round of the 2004 Major League Baseball (MLB) draft. On July 10, Balester signed with the Expos and was assigned to the Rookie-level GCL Expos. In five games, he had a 1–2 win–loss record, a 2.19 ERA and a 1.014 walks plus hits per inning pitched (WHIP).

Before the 2005 season, the Expos relocated to Washington, D.C., and became the Washington Nationals. Baseball America also named Balester the 10th best prospect in the Nationals organization and listed him as having the best fastball of any minor leaguer in their system. To begin the season, Balester joined the Single-A Savannah Sand Gnats and made his debut for the club on April 11, giving up just three hits in six innings and being awarded with the win. In a start against the Greensboro Grasshoppers on July 10, Balester allowed just one hit in eight innings of work, prompting Greensboro News & Record columnist Bill Hass to claim that, "The young right-hander [Balester] turned the Hoppers hitters into traffic cones." On July 29, John Manuel of Baseball America mentioned Balester as a breakout player, along with infielder Kory Casto. In 24 games for Savannah, 23 of which were starts, he went 8–6 with a 3.67 ERA, and a 1.176 WHIP. After the season, Baseball America listed Balester as the second-best prospect in the Nationals system, behind third baseman Ryan Zimmerman.

Balester began the 2006 season with the High-A Potomac Nationals, where he got off to a bad start, going 1–3 with a 6.91 in nine starts. On the bad start, Balester said, "It kind of has been hard. I did so well last year. I think it's going to be good for me that I am failing a little bit more so that I know how to fail. I know I can use this in the future." He also added that, "I get way too high expectations for myself and I've got to realize I am only 19 years old." In late August, after going 4–5 with a 5.20 ERA and a 1.521 WHIP in 22 starts for Potomac, Balester was called up to Double-A Harrisburg. According to The Washington Times, Balester had already booked a flight home to Huntington Beach, expecting not to receive a call-up to Double-A. In three starts for Harrisburg, he went 1–0 with a 1.83 ERA.

In 2007, he was named the top prospect in the entire Nationals organization. Balester started the season with Harrisburg. On July 7, Balester was named to the Team USA roster for the All-Star Futures Game at AT&T Park. The following week, he was called up to the Triple-A Columbus Clippers. In his eagerness to join the Clippers, he got a speeding ticket while driving to Columbus from Harrisburg. In 17 starts for Harrisburg, he went 2–7 with a 3.74 ERA, which the Orange County Register called "middling numbers". In 10 starts for the Clippers, he went 2–3 with a 4.18 ERA. After the season, there were rumors that the Nationals could trade him to the Tampa Bay Devil Rays in exchange for outfielder Elijah Dukes. The Nationals did trade for Dukes in December, but they sent Glenn Gibson to the Devil Rays instead of Balester.

==== 2008 ====
Balester began the 2008 season with Columbus, going 9–3 with a 4.00 ERA in 15 starts for the club. He was called up by the Nationals on June 30, and he made his MLB debut the following day against the Florida Marlins. He pitched five innings, striking out three and allowing one hit in a 9–6 Nationals win. With the win, he became the first Nationals starter to win his debut since Dan Smith did in 1999, when the team was still playing in Montreal. He started 14 more games for the Nationals, going 3–7 with a 5.51 ERA.

==== 2009 ====
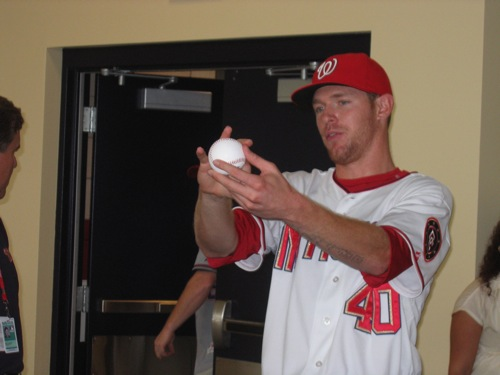
Balester holds a baseball.

In spring training 2009, Balester was part of a battle with Jordan Zimmermann and Shairon Martis for one of the final two spots in the Nationals starting rotation. After going 1–1 with a 6.75 ERA during spring training, he was reassigned to the minors on March 28, but he remained a part of the organization's long-term plans. Over the offseason, the Nationals had switched minor league affiliations, and Balester joined their new Triple-A affiliate, the Syracuse Chiefs. On July 23, after Zimmermann was placed on the 15-day disabled list with elbow pain, Balester was called up to take his place in the rotation. On August 25, the Nationals signed Liván Hernández from free agency and, to make room on the roster, optioned Balester to Triple-A. In seven starts for the Nationals in 2009, he went 1–4 with a 6.82 ERA. After returning to Syracuse, Balester strained a muscle on his left side, ending his season. In 20 total starts with the Chiefs, he went 7–10 with a 4.44 ERA.

==== 2010 ====
On March 15, 2010, Balester was sent to minor league training camp, ensuring that he would start the 2010 season in Syracuse. Balester recorded an 11.65 ERA in his first five starts for the Chiefs, prompting the Nationals to send him to extended spring training to begin the process of converting him to a relief pitcher. On July 24, Balester was called up by the Nationals to replace Luis Atilano, who had been placed on the disabled list with floating bone chips in his elbow. That day, Balester came into the game to replace J. D. Martin and hit Milwaukee Brewers second baseman Rickie Weeks in the head with a fastball. Nine days later, Balester again hit a batter in the head. This time, it was Arizona Diamondbacks third baseman Mark Reynolds. Neither batter suffered a serious injury, but Balester still commented that, "You don't want to do that kind of stuff. It's the second time I did that, but it's one of those things you never want to have happen in your career. It's obviously unintentional. It's not a good situation to be in." On August 8, Balester was optioned back to Syracuse, only to be recalled on August 24, when Stephen Strasburg was placed on the disabled list. However, a day later, he was sent back down to Triple-A. Balester was recalled again for a third time on September 5. In 35 total games for Syracuse, he went 3–3 with a 5.87 ERA, while in 17 games for Washington, he went 0–1 with a 2.57 ERA.

==== 2011 ====
In 2011, Balester was optioned again to Triple-A Syracuse to begin the season. On April 17, after throwing five scoreless innings in his first outing of the year, he was called up to replace Todd Coffey, who had been placed on the disabled list. He was optioned back to Syracuse on April 24, after making two appearances, allowing three runs. After Tom Gorzelanny was placed on the disabled list on May 28, Balester was recalled by the Nationals. At the time of his call-up, he had made 13 appearances with a 3.71 ERA and struck out 18 batters for Syracuse. He spent just one day with Washington as he was optioned back to Triple-A the next day without making an appearance, however, he was recalled again on June 15. He was designated for assignment on July 5. In eight games with the Nationals, he had a 4.61 ERA and a 1.683 WHIP. He was re-added to the 40-man roster on July 7, after the Nationals secured optional waivers for him, meaning they could take him off waivers, should a team try to claim him. On August 2, he was recalled by the Nationals, replacing Atahualpa Severino on the 25-man roster. He spent the rest of the season in the bullpen for the Nationals. In 23 games, he had a 1–4 record, a 4.54 ERA, and 34 strikeouts in 35 2/3 innings. On December 9, Washington traded Balester to the Detroit Tigers for Ryan Perry.

=== Detroit Tigers ===
In 2012, Balester made the Tigers' Opening Day roster as a relief pitcher, marking the first time in his career that he started a season in the major leagues. He picked up wins on April 12 and May 15, both times relieving a starting pitcher who had failed to make it through five innings. However, he was designated for assignment by Detroit on May 23 to make room for Quintin Berry on the roster. In 11 games with the Tigers, he had posted a 2–0 record, a 6.50 ERA, 12 strikeouts, and 11 walks in 18 innings. Balester spent the rest of the season with the Triple-A Toledo Mud Hens, posting a 1–1 record, a 3.64 ERA, 45 strikeouts, and 47 innings pitched in 31 relief outings. He was granted free agency on November 2.

=== Texas Rangers organization ===
Balester signed with the Texas Rangers on November 28, 2012. He was assigned to the Triple-A Round Rock Express to begin the 2013 season. He began the year in Round Rock's rotation, but after allowing six runs in 3 2/3 innings in a start against the Iowa Cubs on April 30, he was placed on the disabled list. On June 6, Balester underwent Tommy John surgery, ending his season. In six games (five starts), he had posted a 1–4 record, a 7.33 ERA, and 22 strikeouts in 27 innings. On November 5, he became a free agent.

=== Pittsburgh Pirates organization ===
Balester signed a minor league contract with the Pittsburgh Pirates on November 20, 2013. Although he was initially assigned to the Triple-A Indianapolis Indians, Balester opened the season on the disabled list and did not start pitching until he underwent a rookie-level rehab assignment. On July 31, he joined the Double-A Altoona Curve. In 10 relief appearances, he had a 1–4 record, a 6.55 ERA, and 10 strikeouts in 11 innings pitched. After the season, he pitched in three games for the Venados de Mazatlán of the Mexican Pacific League.

In 2015, Balester split the first part of the season between Altoona and Indianapolis. In 13 games with Altoona, he had a 1–0 record, 4 saves, a 1.77 ERA, and 14 strikeouts in 20 1/3 innings pitched. With Indianapolis in 8 games, he had no record, a 3.07 ERA, and 8 strikeouts in 14 2/3 innings pitched. On June 19, Balester was traded to the Cincinnati Reds for cash.

=== Cincinnati Reds ===
Balester began his Reds tenure with the Triple-A Louisville Bats. He had no record, seven saves, a 2.05 ERA, and 13 strikeouts in 21 games for the Bats. On August 23, the Reds purchased Balester's contract when Manny Parra went on the disabled list with shoulder trouble and biceps tendinitis. "The last two (years), I've thought: 'Man, am I going to get back?' ... To get back today was a big thing for me," Balester said. He pitched in his first MLB game in three years that same day, then got his first win in three years on August 24, pitching two scoreless innings as the Reds scored 10 runs in the sixth inning to come from behind and beat the Tigers, 12–5. "It was unbelievable – it was the best inning I'd ever seen," Balester said of the offensive outburst. He remained with the Reds for the rest of the season. In his final outing of the year, against the Pirates at PNC Field on October 2, Balester entered a tied game in the 11th and took the loss in the 12th when he gave up a two-run, walk-off home run to Starling Marte. Balester posted a 1–1 record, a 7.47 ERA, 13 strikeouts, and 13 walks in 15 appearances (15 2/3 innings pitched). He was sent outright to Triple-A on October 30. He elected free agency on November 4.

=== Samsung Lions ===
For the 2016 season, Balester was signed by the Samsung Lions of the KBO League. He did not pitch much for them, experiencing a sore right elbow early in the season. He lost all three of his starts for the Lions, recording an 8.03 ERA in the process. The Lions released him on May 18, and Balester considered retirement.

=== San Francisco Giants ===
After moving to Perrysburg, Ohio, Balester starting throwing a baseball again in November. The elbow pain which had plagued him earlier in 2016 was gone, so he decided to make a comeback. On December 20, 2016, he signed a minor league contract with the Tigers. Failing to make the team, he was released on March 29, 2017. On April 19, he signed with the Wichita Wingnuts of the independent American Association. He was released on May 4, before the start of the Wingnuts' spring training, when the Wingnuts signed Danny Moskovits.

On May 6, 2017, Balester signed a minor league contract with the San Francisco Giants. He was assigned to the Double-A Richmond Flying Squirrels on May 22. In 12 games (1 start), he had a 1–4 record, a 2.75 ERA, 21 strikeouts, and 3 walks in 19 2/3 innings. On July 18, he was temporarily assigned to the Single-A Salem-Keizer Volcanoes, but he did not make any appearances with them before getting assigned to the Triple-A Sacramento River Cats on July 22. In 14 games, he had a 1–0 record, a 5.79 ERA, 25 strikeouts, and 7 walks in 23 1/3 innings. The Giants did not call him up at the end of the year. He became a free agent on November 6 and has not pitched professionally since.

== Pitching style ==
Balester throwing a pitch in 2009

Balester threw three pitches: a fastball, a curveball, and a cutter. His fastball was his primary pitch, which he threw over 60 percent of the time. It averaged 93 miles per hour (150 km/h) in the major leagues, topping out at 95 miles per hour (153 km/h). He tended to throw his curveball anywhere from 20 to 30 percent of the time, though in 2010 he threw it 35.5 percent of the time. It averaged 78 miles per hour (126 km/h). Though he resorted to the changeup 14.8 percent of the time in 2008, Balester usually threw it less than three percent of the time with the Nationals. It averaged 84.9 miles per hour (136.6 km/h). His back leg tended to drop too low while he was throwing pitches.

Earlier in his professional career, Balester used to yell at umpires when he did not like a call, but he had become more docile by 2007. "I think I’ve made some progress, especially on the emotional side. When they make a bad call now I just sort of turn my back and walk to the other side of the mound. It’s the type of thing that got me in trouble before," he said that year.

== Personal life ==
Balester married Ashley Sterling in 2009. They have multiple children. Ashley was from Ohio originally, and in 2016, the Balesters moved to Perrysburg, Ohio. They started Local Roots Juice Co., which sells healthy smoothies, cold-pressed juices, and snacks. Balester's sister, Jenna, won several surfing competitions growing up. At various times with the Nationals, he had a mustache. He re-grew it in November 2010 for Movember, as part of an effort to educate people about cancers affecting men. None of his family had been affected by such cancer, yet Balester wanted to be part of the cause.
