= Ronnie Belliard =

American baseball player (born 1975)

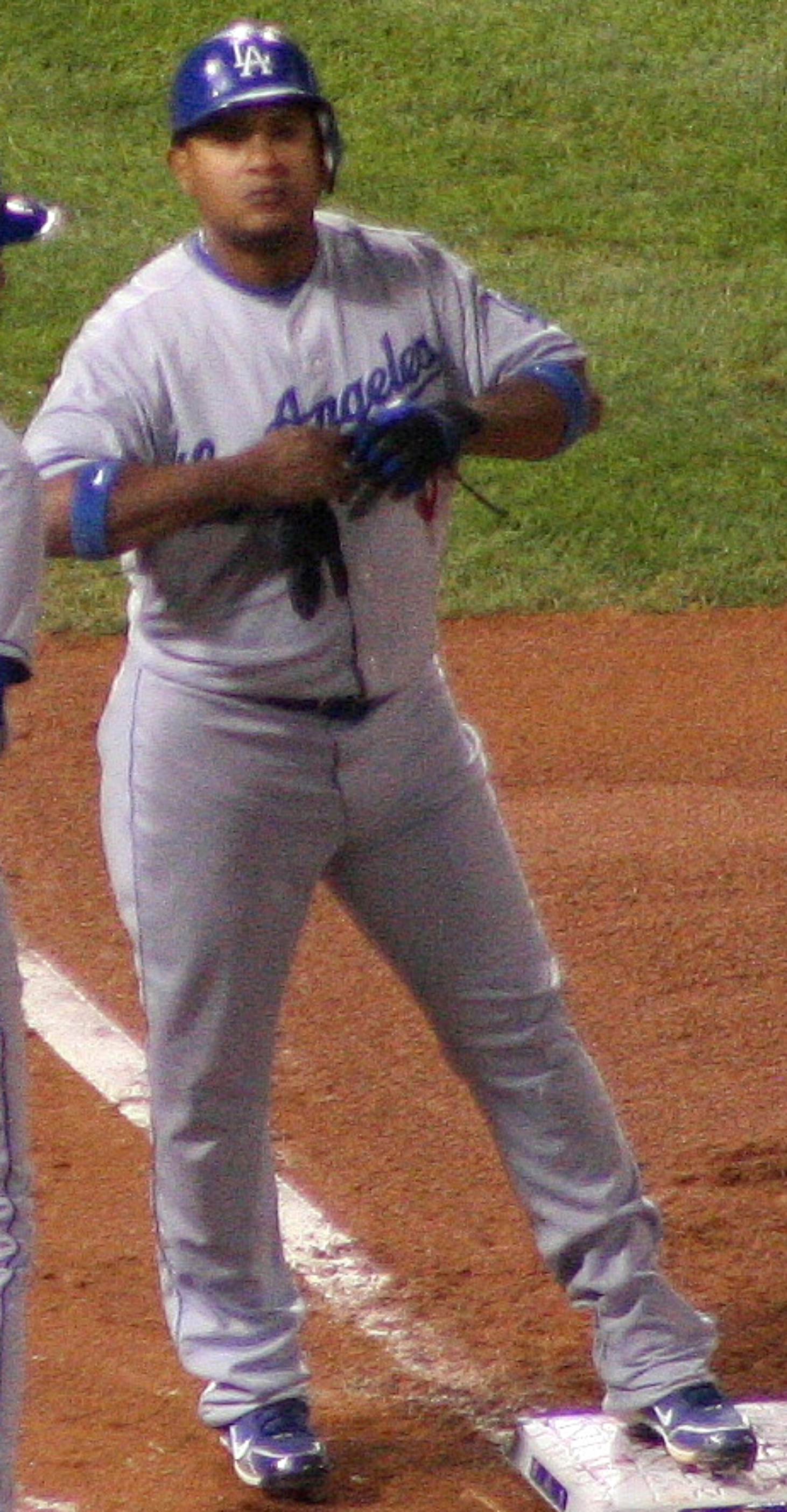
- Second baseman
- Born: April 7, 1975 (age 51); Bronx, New York, U.S.
- Batted: Right Threw: Right

MLB debut
- September 12, 1998, for the Milwaukee Brewers

Last MLB appearance
- September 6, 2010, for the Los Angeles Dodgers

MLB statistics
- Batting average: .273
- Home runs: 114
- Runs batted in: 601
- Stats at Baseball Reference

Teams
- Milwaukee Brewers (1998–2002); Colorado Rockies (2003); Cleveland Indians (2004–2006); St. Louis Cardinals (2006); Washington Nationals (2007–2009); Los Angeles Dodgers (2009–2010)

Career highlights and awards
- All-Star (2004); World Series champion (2006)

Ronald Belliard (born April 7, 1975) is an American former professional baseball second baseman. He played 13 seasons in Major League Baseball (MLB) from 1998 to 2010 for the Milwaukee Brewers, Colorado Rockies, Cleveland Indians, St. Louis Cardinals, Washington Nationals and the Los Angeles Dodgers. He batted and threw right-handed. Belliard was born in The Bronx, New York.

== Early life ==
Belliard is born to Dominican parents, in Bronx New York. Belliard attended Central High School in Miami, Florida. He is a distant cousin of former major league shortstop Rafael Belliard.

== Professional career ==
=== Milwaukee Brewers ===
Belliard was drafted by the Milwaukee Brewers in the 8th round of the 1994 Major League Baseball draft. Belliard played in the Brewers farm system from 1994 to 1999, winning Texas League All-Star honors in 1996 and in 1998 he was honored as a Triple-A All-Star, International League All-Star, Baseball America 1st Team Minor League All-Star and Brewers Minor League Player of the Year.

He made his Major League debut on September 12, 1998, as a pinch runner against the Chicago Cubs and he got his first Major League hit in his first at-bat, as a pinch hitter, on September 16 against the Cincinnati Reds.

In 1999, Belliard was named Milwaukee Brewers rookie player of the year. After he began the season at Triple A Louisville, he was recalled on May 11. He finished the season tops among National League rookies in almost every offensive category, including batting average (1st), runs batted in (6th), multi-hit games (4th), runs (6th), hits (4th), total bases (5th), doubles (2nd), triples (T-3rd), hitting streaks (T-5th), walks (1st), on-base percentage (1st), slugging percentage (3rd) and extra base hits (4th). Ronnie hit his first Major league home run and drove in his first run with a solo shot May 15.

In 2000, Belliard established career highs in several categories, including games (152), runs scored (83), hits (150) and doubles (30) while setting the Brewers' National League franchise record with career-high 9 triples.

2001 saw Belliard set a career mark with 11 home runs and equaled a career-high with 30 doubles previously set in 2000. Ronnie was Milwaukee's Opening Day second baseman.

In 2002, Belliard played second base (49 games) and third base (42 games) for Milwaukee.

=== Colorado Rockies ===
On January 17, 2003, Belliard was signed as a minor league free agent by the Colorado Rockies after being non-tendered by Milwaukee on December 20 and became the first non-roster invitee in franchise history to start on Opening Day.

=== Cleveland Indians ===
Belliard signed a one-year deal with the Cleveland Indians for the 2004 campaign. In 2004 Belliard enjoyed a fine season from an offensive standpoint, stabilizing the second base position after the club experienced inconsistency at the position in 2003. Ronnie amassed career-highs in hits (169), doubles (48) and RBI (70) and also set a new career-high with 12 HR. He finished 2nd in the American League with 48 doubles, which represented the highest total by an Indian since Albert Belle's 52 in 1995. His .282 batting average at second base led all AL second basemen. His 169 hits ranked 2nd and his 69 RBI placed 4th among league 2B. Belliard earned his first trip to the All-Star Game after hitting .304 (103–339) in the first half with 5 home-runs and 37 RBI in 84 games (was voted in by players). He avoided arbitration and signed a 1-year contract on December 20 with a club option for 2006. In 2005, Belliard collected new career-highs in homers (17) and RBI (78) as he finished 3rd among AL second basemen in RBI and doubles (36) and 4th in home runs.

=== St. Louis Cardinals ===
On July 30, 2006, Belliard was traded to the St. Louis Cardinals for utility infielder Héctor Luna in a move designed to acquire for St. Louis an every-day second baseman for the stretch run, and to provide bench bat strength for Cleveland.

Belliard was a key part of the Cardinals' success in the 2006 National League Division Series when he hit .462 with two RBI and two runs scored. The Cardinals defeated the San Diego Padres three games to one to advance to the National League Championship Series. Belliard eventually won his first World Series ring when the Cardinals won the 2006 World Series, defeating the Detroit Tigers, four games to one. At the end of the season, however, Belliard was not re-signed, and became a free agent.

=== Washington Nationals ===
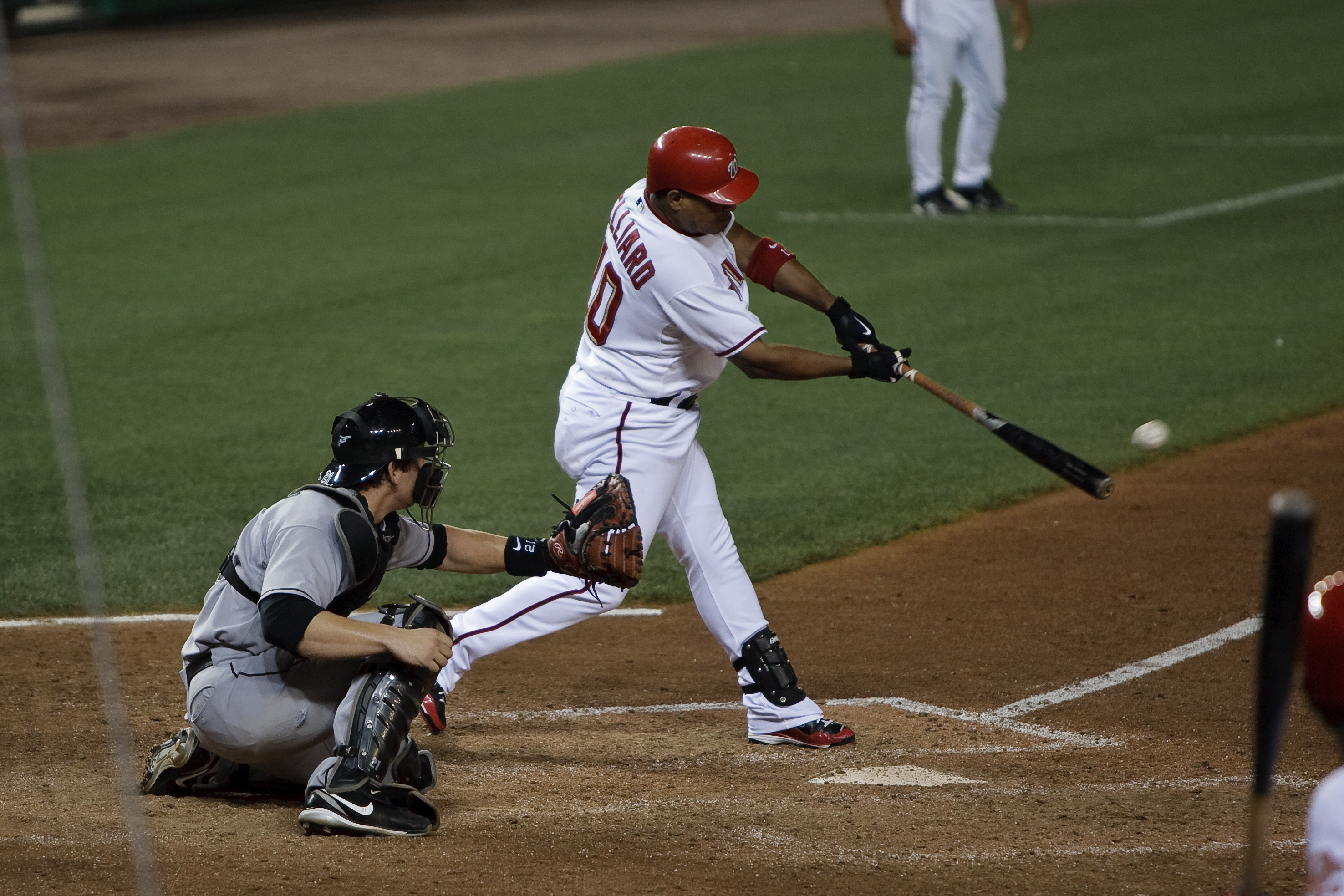
Belliard batting for the Washington Nationals in 2009.

Belliard signed a minor league contract with the Washington Nationals on February 18, 2007. He was added to the Nationals' 40-man roster on March 22, 2007. Following an Opening Day injury to shortstop Cristian Guzmán, second baseman Felipe López was moved to shortstop, while Belliard filled in at second base. Guzmán came back in early May, but at the end of June suffered a season-ending injury putting Belliard back into the starting line-up. By July 23 Belliard had appeared in 85 of the Nationals 98 games, batting .305, and signed a two-year $3.5 million extension with the Nationals. He was viewed as a valuable veteran, capable of starting or as a utility infielder.

Belliard hit a game-ending two-run home run shot off of closer George Sherrill with two outs and two strikes in 12th inning, erasing a 2–1 deficit on June 29, 2008, against the Baltimore Orioles.

On August 22, 2008, Belliard was a triple away from the cycle as he singled, doubled twice, and homered in a Nationals 13–5 victory over the Chicago Cubs at Wrigley Field.

During the 2008 season Belliard set career highs with .473 slugging and .372 on-base percentages despite missing nearly two months with injuries. He hit 11 home runs in 96 games (296 at bats) making his ratio of 26.9 at bats-per-home run. This ranked second among Nationals behind Elijah Dukes.

=== Los Angeles Dodgers ===
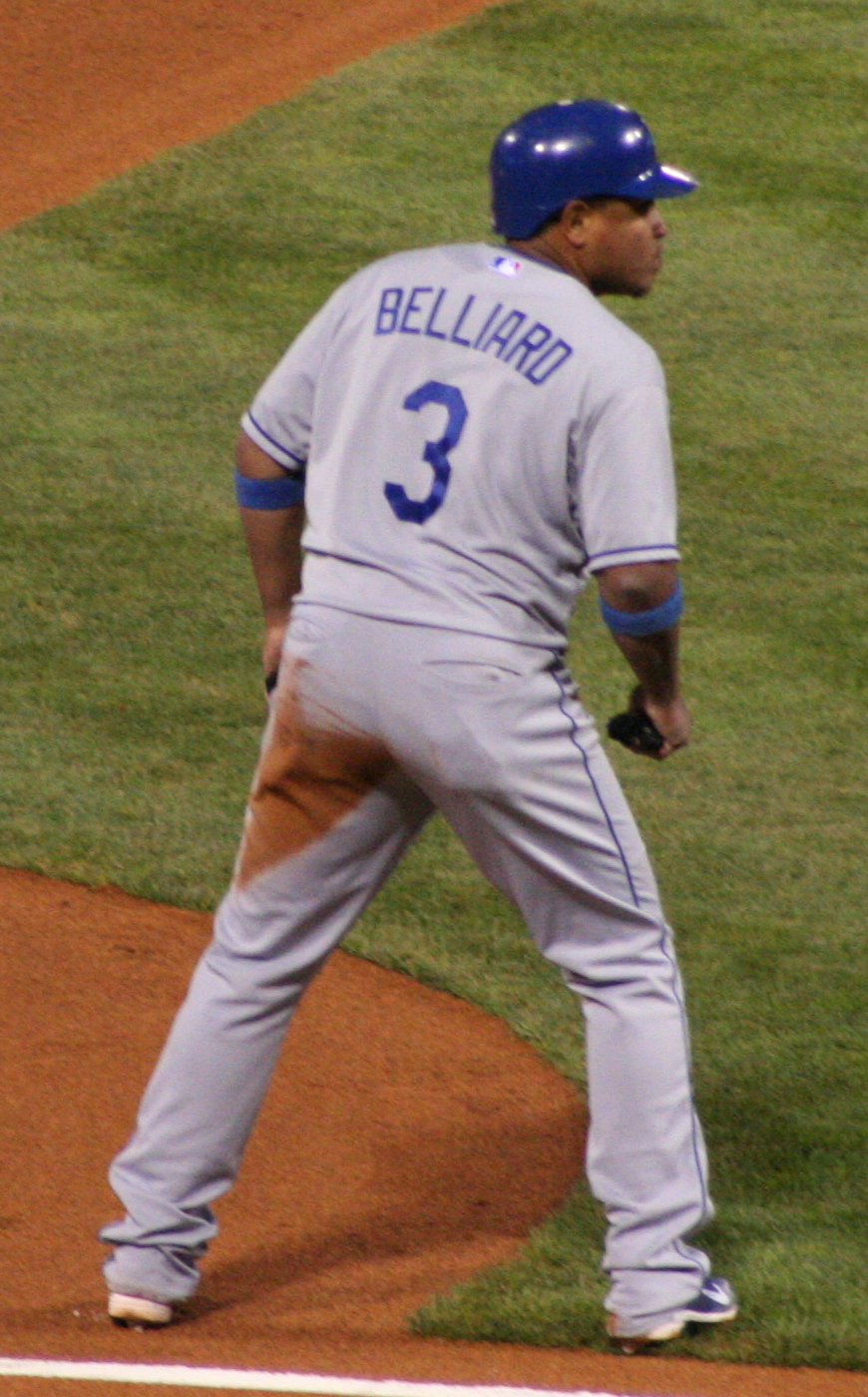
Belliard during his tenure with the Los Angeles Dodgers in 2009.

On August 30, 2009, Belliard was traded to the Los Angeles Dodgers for minor leaguer Luis Garcia. Belliard said this about the trade:

I'm happy because I'm going to L.A. and that team is in first place, but I'm sad because I am going to leave a lot of friends. I've been here for the last three years and I made a lot of friends. This late in the year, this wasn't in my mind.

In his first at-bat as a Dodger, Belliard hit a home run against Doug Davis of the Arizona Diamondbacks.

In 24 games with the Dodgers, he hit .351 with five home runs and took over the starting second baseman job from Orlando Hudson for the postseason.

On January 26, 2010, the Dodgers re-signed Belliard to a 1-year $850,000 contract. He played in 82 games as a part-time player for the Dodgers in 2010, hitting .216. He was designated for assignment on September 7, 2010, and then released on September 9.

=== New York Yankees ===
On February 4, 2011, Belliard agreed to a minor league contract with an invitation to spring training with the New York Yankees worth $825,000. He was released on March 28.

=== Philadelphia Phillies ===
On March 30, 2011, Belliard agreed to a minor league contract with the Philadelphia Phillies. He played in 53 games for the AAA Lehigh Valley IronPigs, hitting .251.

On June 14, 2011, Belliard announced his retirement

== Offseason ==
During the offseason, he used to play with the Tigres del Licey in the Dominican Winter League, where he was the captain of the team.

== Extortion case ==
Federal authorities in St. Louis said a man, George Edwards, tried to get an athlete (not releasing his name, though Belliard's agent later confirmed it was the second baseman) to pay $150,000 to keep quiet about a sexual encounter with Edwards' daughter, Laura L. Edwards, which allegedly resulted in a pregnancy.

Federal prosecutors only described the athlete in court as "the victim". Court papers referred only to a "John Doe" in accusing George Edwards, 48, of extortion for allegedly seeking money for silence about the player supposedly impregnating Edwards' daughter.

Belliard's agent, Dominic Torres, confirmed that Belliard was the player at the center of the extortion case and provided this statement:

The events as they are told are completely unfounded. I have been working with the FBI from the onset in an attempt to apprehend this known extortionist and his daughter. In the end, my client will be vindicated and due to the continuing legal nature of this case, I have no further comments at this time.

An affidavit by FBI Special Agent Dustin Sorrells said this about the case:

Laura Edwards and the athlete had an "encounter" on September 29 and she left messages for him in late October or early November. He had a friend call back. That friend's message was returned by George Edwards, who met with the friend and said his daughter was pregnant and wanted money.

The friend offered several thousand dollars. Later in November, a sports agent worked out a deal to pay $25,000 for a paternity test, and $125,000 more if the child was the athlete's.

George Edwards and a different sports agent met Jan. 5 at a hotel near Lambert Field, where the agent gave George Edwards $25,000 cash.

George Edwards admitted to hatching the scheme in court documents and was sentenced by U.S. District Judge Catherine Perry to one year and one day in prison. It was less than the recommended range of 21 to 27 months, based on Edwards' past criminal convictions. Perry said she considered the case's unusual circumstances.
