= Pete Orr =

Canadian baseball player (born 1979)

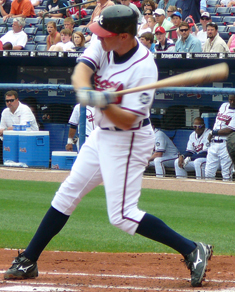
- Orr with the Braves in June 2007
- Infielder
- Born: June 8, 1979 (age 47); Richmond Hill, Ontario, Canada
- Batted: Left Threw: Right

MLB debut
- April 5, 2005, for the Atlanta Braves

Last MLB appearance
- September 26, 2013, for the Philadelphia Phillies

MLB statistics
- Batting average: .257
- Home runs: 3
- Runs batted in: 46
- Stats at Baseball Reference

Teams
- Atlanta Braves (2005–2007); Washington Nationals (2008–2009); Philadelphia Phillies (2011–2013)
Medals
Men's baseball
Representing Canada
Pan American Games
Gold medal – first place	2015 Toronto	Team

Peterson Thomas "Pete" Orr (born June 8, 1979) is a Canadian former professional baseball infielder. He played in Major League Baseball (MLB) for the Atlanta Braves, Washington Nationals, and Philadelphia Phillies.

== Amateur career ==
=== High school ===
Orr attended Newmarket High School in Newmarket, Ontario while playing baseball for the Ontario Blue Jaysnan amateur baseball team. He was a 39th round draft pick of the Texas Rangers in 1998 (1,187th overall) but did not sign with the team.

=== College ===
Orr attended Galveston Community College in Galveston, Texas in 1998 and 1999.

== Professional career ==
=== Atlanta Braves ===
Orr signed as an undrafted free agent with the Atlanta Braves on July 3, 1999. He spent his first professional season with Short-Season Jamestown Jammers of the New York–Penn League in 2000, hitting .242 with two homers, 15 RBIs and 40 runs scored in 69 games. He hit .233 with four homers, 23 RBIs and 38 runs scored in 92 games with the Class-A Advanced Myrtle Beach Pelicans of the Carolina League in 2001.

In 2002, Orr spent most of the season with the Double-A Greenville Braves of the Southern League, hitting .249 with two homers, 36 RBIs and 36 runs scored in 89 games and leading the team with 23 steals. He also hit .392 with eight RBIs in 17 games with Class-A Advanced Myrtle Beach. He spent the 2003 season with Double-A Greenville, batting .226 with two homers and 31 RBIs in 98 games. He was named a postseason Southern League All-Star.

Orr established career highs in average, .320, hits, 147, doubles, 16, triples, 10, stolen bases, 24 and runs scored 69. His .320 batting average and 24 stolen bases led the Triple-A Richmond Braves in 2004. He was selected to play in the International League All-Star game. He was named International League April Player of the Month, posting a .381 batting average with four doubles, one triple and five RBIs. He ranked fifth in the IL and fourth among Braves Minor Leaguers in average, tied second in the IL and led Braves Minor Leaguers in triples, tied for sixth in the IL and led Braves Minor Leaguers in hits and tied for seventh among Braves Minor Leaguers in stolen bases. Orr won the Bill Lucas Award as the player who best represents the Braves organization on and off the field by the 400 Club. He was also part of Team Canada that finished in fourth place at the 2004 Summer Olympics.

Orr made his major league debut for Atlanta on April 5, 2005. His first MLB home run was a pinch-hit home run off Roberto Hernández of the New York Mets on April 25. He proved to be a versatile defender, playing second base, third base, and various outfield positions during the 2005 season. In a career-high 112 games, only 21 of them starts, he batted .300 with 1 home run, 8 RBI, and 7 stolen bases. In his only MLB postseason appearance, he batted 0-for-2 as a pinch hitter in the National League Division Series.

Orr filled a similar bench role in 2006, batting .253 in 102 games. His lone home run on the season was, again, a pinch-hit home run, dingering off Ramón Ortiz of the Washington Nationals on June 7.

Orr was optioned to Triple-A Richmond on July 5, 2007, when the Braves called up Jo-Jo Reyes. Orr was brought up again on August 27. He was designated for assignment by the Atlanta Braves on November 20 and was released on November 28.

=== Washington Nationals ===
In December 2007, Orr signed a minor league contract with the Washington Nationals and on June 21, 2008, his contract was selected by the Nationals along with right-handed pitcher Steven Shell.

On October 30, 2008, Orr rejected his assignment to Triple-A and became a free agent. However, he returned to the team two weeks later, signing a minor league deal, playing with the Syracuse Chiefs in the International League, with a chance to earn a spot on the team in the spring. He returned to the majors at the end of August. He hit a walk-off sacrifice fly against the Los Angeles Dodgers on September 23 and a game-winning single against Atlanta on October 1.

=== Philadelphia Phillies ===
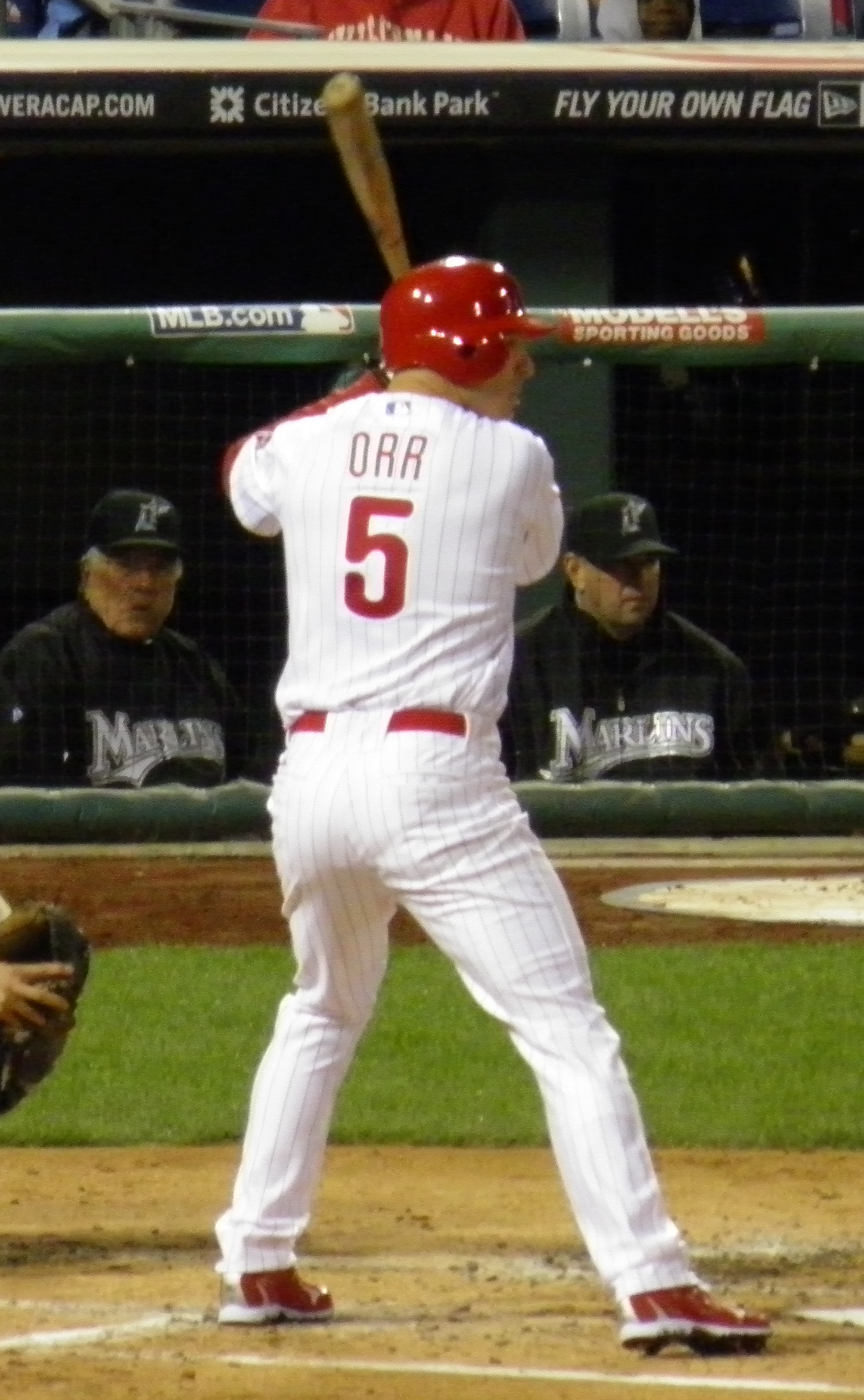
Orr batting for the Philadelphia Phillies in 2011

On November 11, 2010, Orr signed with the Philadelphia Phillies. During spring training play, he led the majors with 5 triples, subsequently becoming a member of the team's Opening Day roster. After spending the 2011 season with both the Phillies and the Lehigh Valley IronPigs, their Triple-A affiliate, he became a free agent on October 18. On November 3, he re-signed a minor league contract with the Phillies, receiving an invite to spring training.

Orr was again included on the team's Opening Day roster for the 2012 season. He elected free agency on October 8. In parts of 3 seasons with Philadelphia from 2011 to 2013, Orr batted .247 with no home runs and 11 RBI in 96 games.

=== Milwaukee Brewers ===
Orr signed a minor league deal with the Milwaukee Brewers on January 27, 2014, and spent the 2014 season with their Triple-A affiliate Nashville Sounds.

Orr signed another minor league contract with the Brewers on November 7, 2014. He started the 2015 season with Milwaukee's new Triple-A affiliate, the Colorado Springs Sky Sox.

== International career ==
Orr played for the Canada national team in the 2004 Summer Olympics, batting .353 with 1 home run, 8 RBI, and two stolen bases as Canada finished fourth. Baseball Canada named him the team's MVP in January 2005. He was scheduled to play in the 2008 Summer Olympics before the Nationals called him up to the majors.

Orr also played for Canada in the 2006 World Baseball Classic (WBC), 2009 WBC, 2013 WBC, and 2017 WBC. He batted 1-for-12 in 2006, primarily playing shortstop. In 2009, he was 0-for-7. In 2013, he batted 2-for-10 with a double and two RBIs. He was 2-for-11 in 2017.

In the 2015 Pan Am Games in Toronto, Orr scored the winning run in the championship game, beating the U.S. in 10 innings. He also played in the 2015 WBSC Premier12 tournament. The 2015 was inducted into the Canadian Baseball Hall of Fame in 2017.

Orr was scheduled to coach Canada's junior national team in 2020, but baseball activities were canceled due to the COVID-19 pandemic. He later coached the junior national team.

== Post-playing career ==
The Milwaukee Brewers hired Orr in October 2016 to be baseball scout. He remained with the Brewers through the 2024 season.

Orr was a coach for the Toronto Mets of the Canadian Premier Baseball League, an amateur youth league in Ontario, in 2021.

== Personal life ==
Orr is married and has a son.

Orr wore the uniform number 4, beginning in youth hockey and later with all three MLB teams, in honor of hockey legend Bobby Orr, who he is not related to.
