= Shawn Hill =

Canadian baseball player (born 1981)

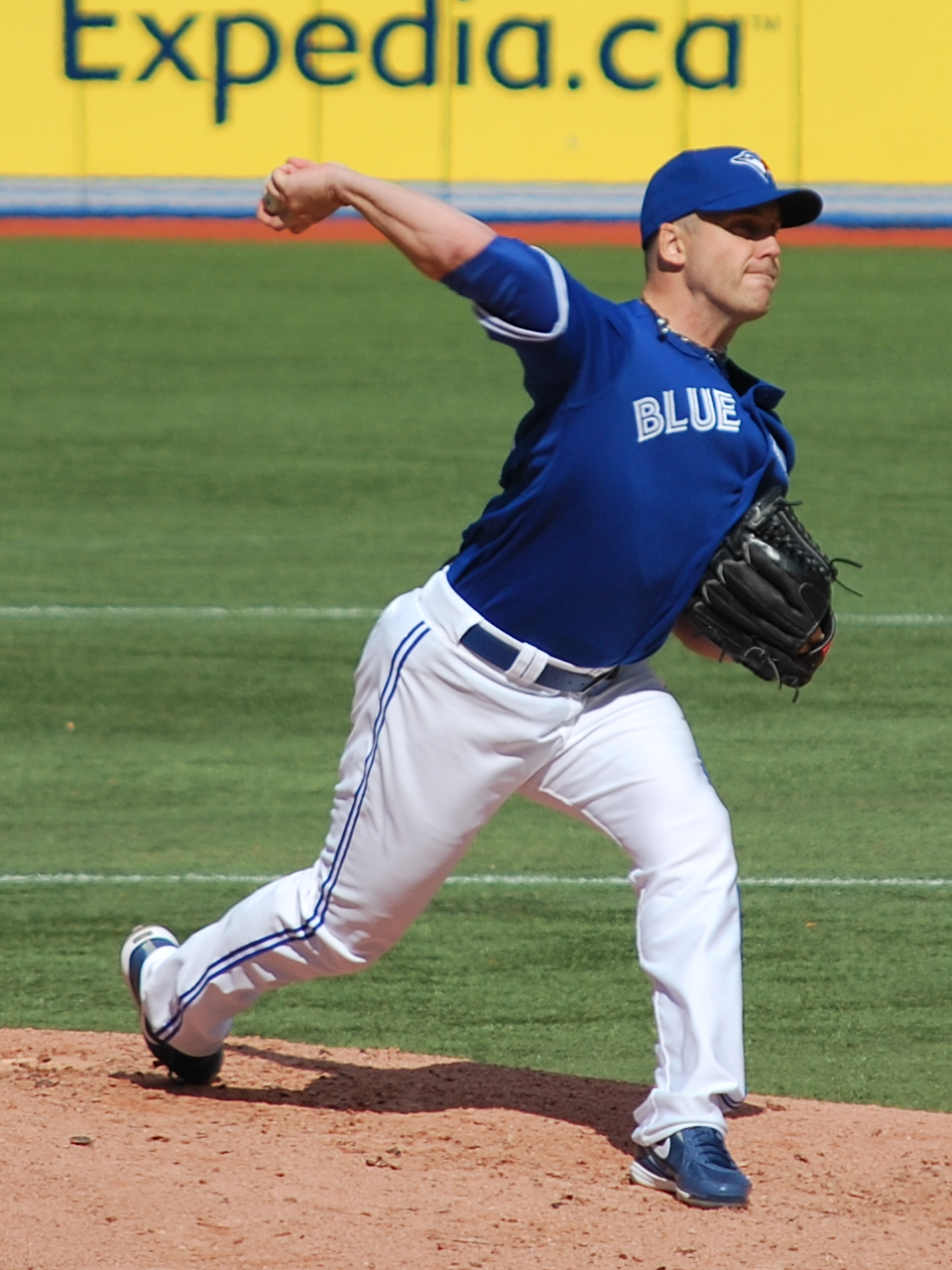
- Hill with the Toronto Blue Jays in 2012
- Pitcher
- Born: April 28, 1981 (age 44); Mississauga, Ontario, Canada
- Batted: Right Threw: Right

MLB debut
- June 29, 2004, for the Montreal Expos

Last MLB appearance
- September 29, 2012, for the Toronto Blue Jays

MLB statistics
- Win–loss record: 10–18
- Earned run average: 4.69
- Strikeouts: 151
- Stats at Baseball Reference

Teams
- Montreal Expos / Washington Nationals (2004, 2006–2008); San Diego Padres (2009); Toronto Blue Jays (2010, 2012)
Medals
Men's baseball
Representing Canada
Pan American Games
Gold medal – first place	2011 Guadalajara	Team
Gold medal – first place	2015 Toronto	Team

Shawn Richard Hill (born April 28, 1981) is a Canadian former professional baseball pitcher. He has played in Major League Baseball (MLB) for the Montreal Expos/Washington Nationals, San Diego Padres and Toronto Blue Jays. He was part of Team Canada at the 2004 Summer Olympics, which finished fourth.

== Amateur career ==
Hill played high-school baseball at Bishop Reding Catholic Secondary School in Milton, Ontario, Canada.

== Minor league career ==
Hill was drafted by the San Diego Padres in the 33rd round, 1,012nd overall, of the 1999 MLB draft, but did not sign. He was drafted the next year draft by the Montreal Expos in the sixth round, 165th overall. In 82 minor league games Hill has a 32–24 record. He has a 3.16 earned run average (ERA) in five minor league seasons, not including 2010. In 14 minor league at-bats, Hill has four hits, one double, two home runs, seven runs batted in (RBIs) and four runs. Hill participated in the 2003 All-Star Futures Game, playing for the World team.

== Major league career ==
=== Montreal Expos / Washington Nationals ===
Hill made his MLB debut on June 29, 2004 against the Philadelphia Phillies. Hill went 2 2/3 innings, giving up seven hits, four walks, and eight earned runs in a 17–7 loss. On July 4, 2004, Hill was the winning pitcher in what was the final game between two Canadian MLB teams, as the Expos defeated the Toronto Blue Jays, 6–4. Ironically, the game was played at Hiram Bithorn Stadium in San Juan, Puerto Rico, where 21 of Montreal's home games were played in 2004. His final start of 2004 came on July 9, in which he pitched 1 1/3 innings, giving up seven hits and seven earned runs in an 11–0 loss against the Pittsburgh Pirates. Overall, Hill finished the season with a 1–2 record and an ERA of 16.00.

Hill missed all of 2005 with Tommy John surgery, and was on Canada's provisional roster for the 2006 World Baseball Classic, but he did not play. Hill returned to make a start for the Washington Nationals on May 27, 2006, against the Los Angeles Dodgers. He pitched seven innings, allowing one earned run and five hits, striking out three batters and walking two. Hill made his last start of 2006 on June 28, following an injury which cut short his season.

In 2007, Hill started the season as the number two pitcher for the Nationals, but emerged as the team's ace early on. In his first seven starts, he lasted six innings or more six times, and allowed two earned runs or less six times. On May 11, he threw five no-hit innings, then took himself out because of elbow soreness, ending up on the 15-day disabled list. He returned on August 14 in a start against the Phillies. He pitched six innings of one-hit ball, while striking out seven and walking only one.

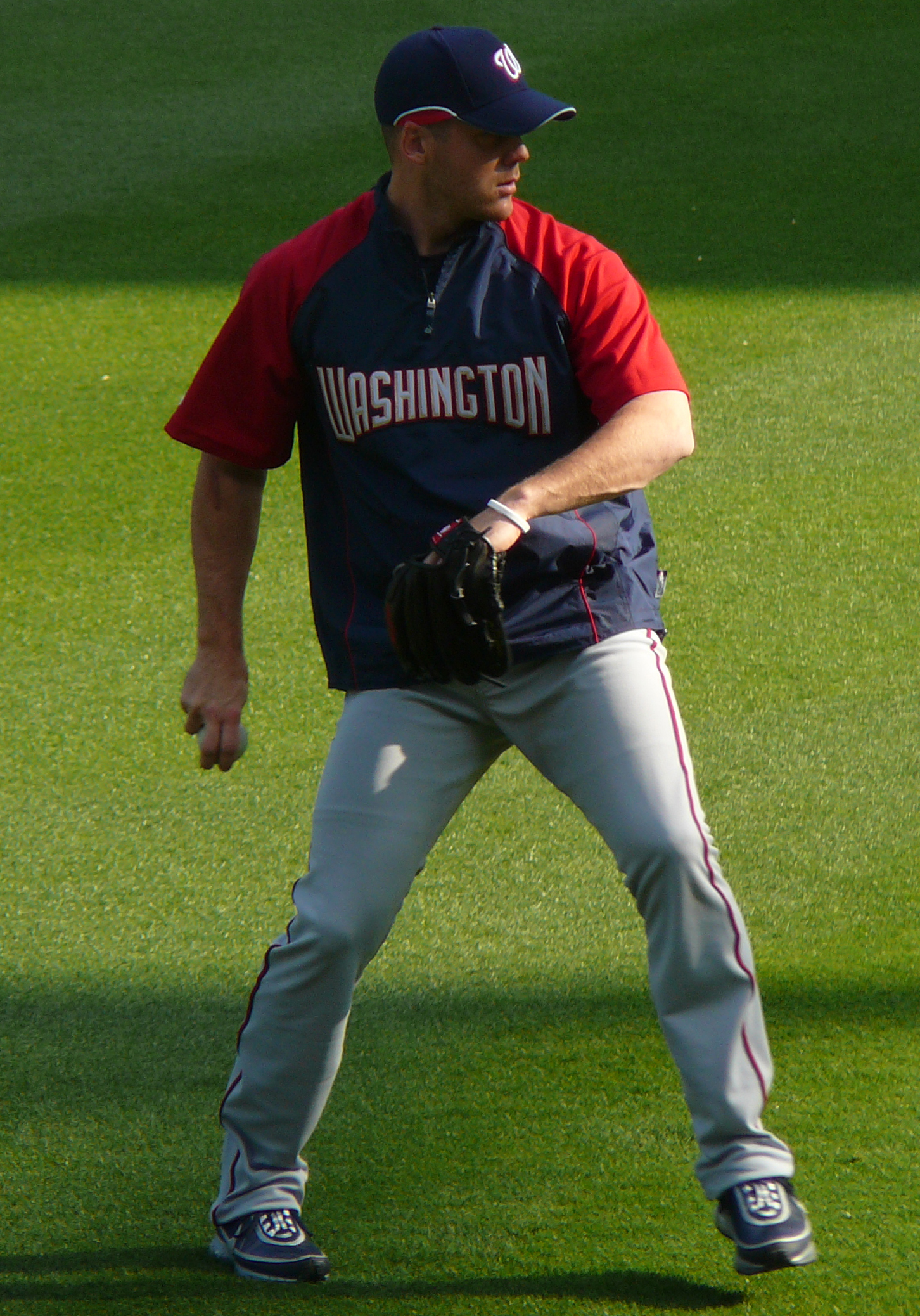
Hill with the Washington Nationals in 2008

Hill's 2008 season was cut short due to injury. He was placed on the disabled list twice for arm problems before his season was ended on June 25, 2008. Hill underwent arthroscopic surgery to remove bone spurs on his right elbow in September 2008.

During the 2008 offseason, he went to an arbitration hearing with the Nationals, winning the case. Washington paid him $775,000 in 2009, instead of the $500,000 they had offered.

On March 18, 2009, Shawn Hill was released by the Washington Nationals.

=== San Diego Padres ===
Hill signed a minor league contract with the San Diego Padres on March 23, 2009. Hill managed to pitch in just 3 starts for the Padres.

On June 24, 2009, Hill had his second Tommy John surgery. On October 8, he was released by the Padres.

=== Toronto Blue Jays ===
On January 22, 2010, Hill signed a minor league contract with the Toronto Blue Jays, with an invitation to spring training. Hill spent most of his 2010 season in the minor leagues with the Blue Jays organization, and pitched very well at all stops, the last of which was the Las Vegas 51s, the Jays' Triple-A team. Hill posted a 1.61 ERA in 11 minor league starts in 2010.

On September 6, 2010, Hill was called up to the Toronto Blue Jays. He started on September 9 against the Texas Rangers, in his first major league action in more than 26 months. Hill lasted 5 1/3 innings, allowed three earned runs, and was given the loss in a 4–2 game. Hill finished the season compiling a 1–2 record in four starts with a 2.61 ERA and 14 strikeouts in 20 2/3 innings pitched. On November 15, 2010, Hill was released by the Blue Jays. Hill is one of only four Canadians to have played for both the Toronto Blue Jays and Montreal Expos, the others being Matt Stairs, Rob Ducey and Denis Boucher.

=== Florida Marlins ===
On January 24, 2011, Hill signed a minor league contract with the Florida Marlins with an invitation to Spring training.

Hill went on to pitch in just 4 games in Spring training before being released on April 2. He did not pitch for any organization in 2011 following his release.

=== York Revolution ===
On May 5, 2012, Hill signed with the York Revolution of the Atlantic League of Professional Baseball. In 7 games (5 starts) 29.2 innings he went 2-0 with a 2.43 ERA and 21 strikeouts.

=== Toronto Blue Jays (second stint) ===
On June 18, 2012, the Blue Jays signed Shawn Hill to a minor league contract. On He had his contract selected to the major league roster on September 24. October 4, he was outrighted to the Blue Jays' Triple-A affiliate Buffalo Bisons. Hill elected free agency rather than reporting to the Bisons.

=== Detroit Tigers ===
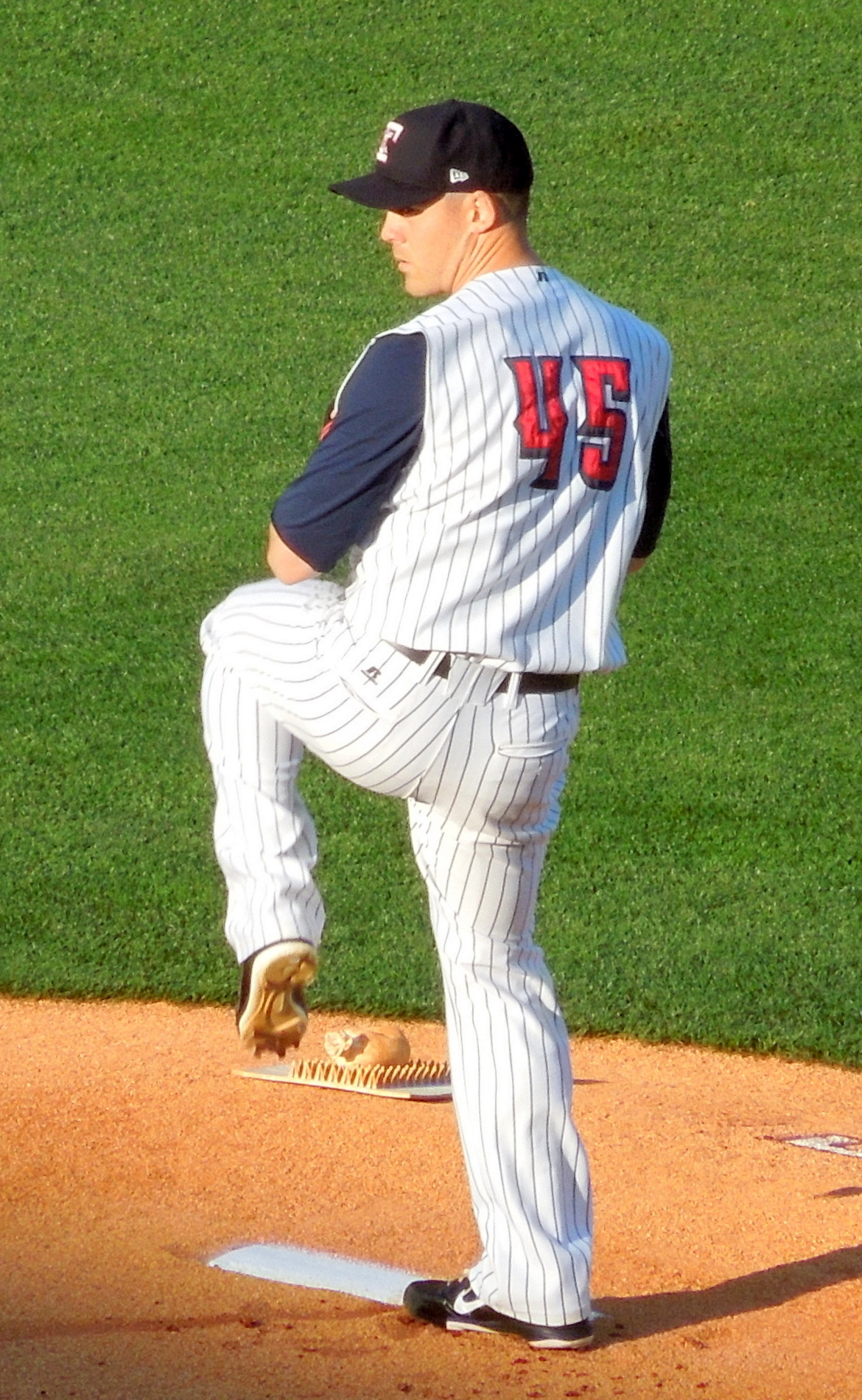
Hill pitching for the Toledo Mud Hens, triple-A affiliate of the Detroit Tigers, in 2013.

On November 24, 2012, Hill signed a minor league deal with the Detroit Tigers. Hill spent the whole season in the minors, appearing in 26 starts. He recorded a record of 4-14 with a 5.51 ERA in 150.1 innings. He became a free agent following the season on November 4.

=== York Revolution (second stint) ===
On March 21, 2014, Hill signed with the York Revolution of the Atlantic League of Professional Baseball. He did not appear in a game with the Revolution.

=== Toronto Blue Jays (third stint) ===
On March 24, 2014, Hill signed a minor league contract with the Toronto Blue Jays. He started the season with the Double-A New Hampshire Fisher Cats. He was called up to the Triple-A Buffalo Bisons on May 7, and returned to New Hampshire on June 7.

=== Chicago White Sox ===
On June 11, 2014, the Blue Jays traded Hill to the Chicago White Sox, and he was assigned to the Triple A Charlotte Knights. He was released by the Knights on August 10.

=== Detroit Tigers (second stint) ===
On August 12, 2014, Hill signed a minor league contract with the Detroit Tigers. He became a free agent following the season on November 2.

=== York Revolution (third stint) ===
On April 3, 2015, Hill signed with the York Revolution of the Atlantic League of Professional Baseball. He became a free agent following the season. In 17 starts 82.2 innings he went 3-8 with a 4.46 ERA and 61 strikeouts.

== Scouting report ==
Hill is a sinker/slider pitcher, when healthy posts groundball rates of over 50%.

== Personal life ==
He is married to the former Ashley Jenne of Melbourne, Florida. He and his wife reside in Viera, Florida in the off-season. He and Ashley have 2 daughters and a son.

== See also ==
- List of Major League Baseball players from Canada
