= Mike Hinckley =

American baseball player (born 1982)

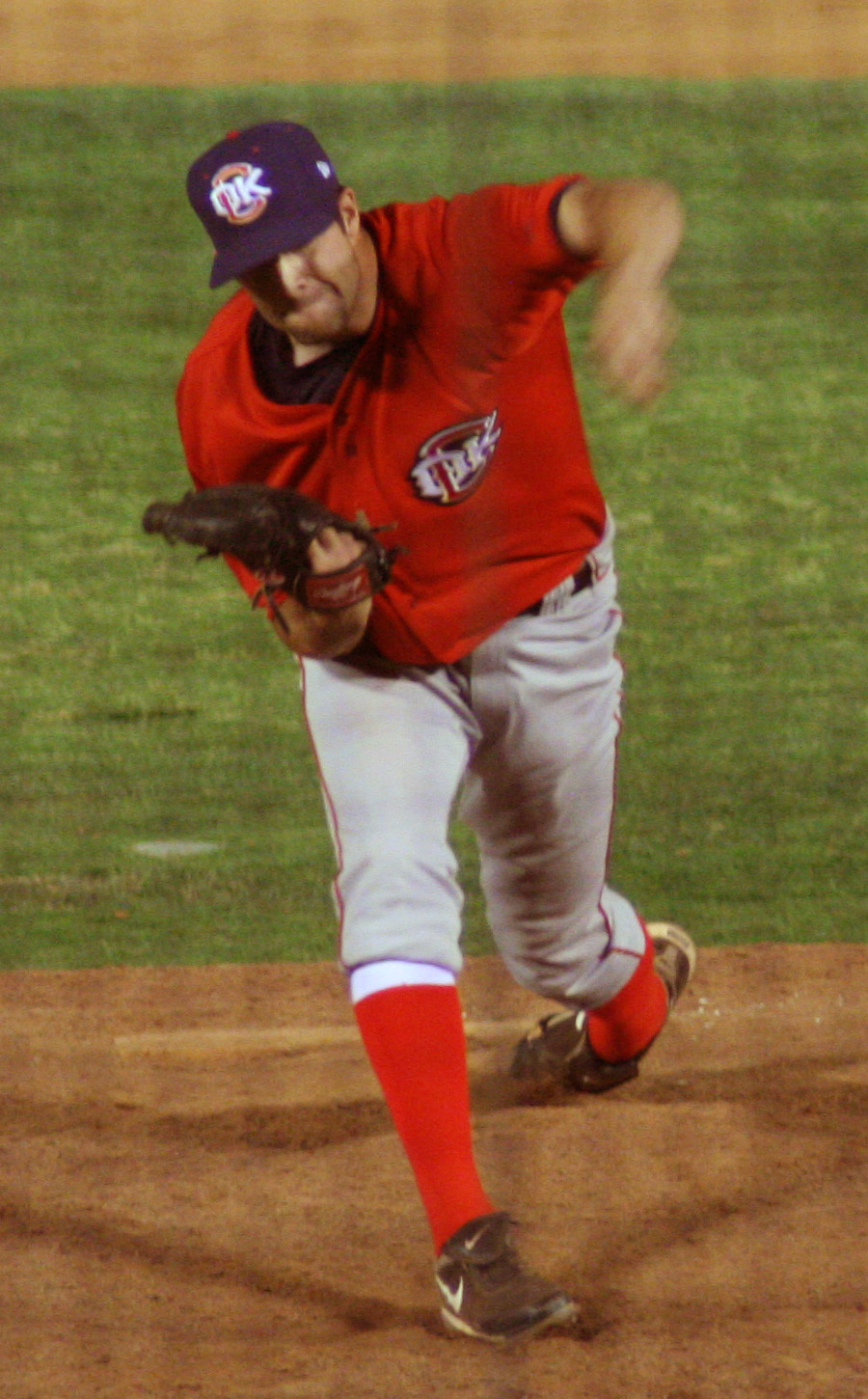
- Hinckley pitching for the Oklahoma City RedHawks, Triple-A affiliates of the Texas Rangers, in 2009.
- Relief pitcher
- Born: October 5, 1982 (age 43); Oklahoma City, Oklahoma, U.S.
- Batted: Right Threw: Left

MLB debut
- September 2, 2008, for the Washington Nationals

Last MLB appearance
- May 6, 2009, for the Washington Nationals

MLB statistics
- Win–loss record: 0–0
- Earned run average: 1.93
- Strikeouts: 12
- Stats at Baseball Reference

Teams
- Washington Nationals (2008–2009)

Michael David Hinckley (born October 5, 1982) is an American former professional baseball pitcher. He grew up in Moore, Oklahoma, where he played high school baseball. He and his wife LeAnna have five children, Cora, Isaac, Livingstone, Rory, and Phillip.

== Baseball career ==
Hinckley was a 3rd round draft pick by the Montreal Expos (who became the Washington Nationals in 2005) in the 2001 Major League Baseball draft, as a senior at Moore High School in Moore, Oklahoma. He was added to the Nationals 40-man roster in September 2007 and called up to the majors on September 1, 2008, making his debut the next day and pitching 1 2/3 scoreless innings in relief against the Philadelphia Phillies.

On November 25, 2009, the Baltimore Orioles signed Hinckley to a minor league deal.

On December 21, 2010, the Toronto Blue Jays signed Hinckley to a minor league contract with an invitation to spring training. He was released on June 27, 2011, after recording a 5.68 ERA in the Blue Jays minor league system.
