= Charlie Manning =

American baseball player (born 1979)

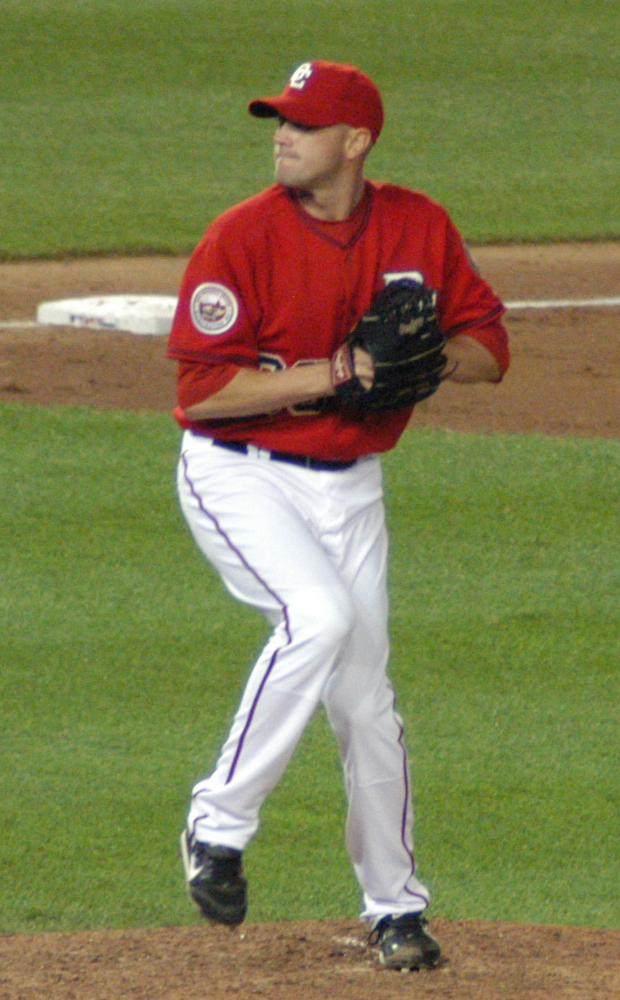
- Relief pitcher
- Born: March 31, 1979 (age 47); Winter Haven, Florida, U.S.
- Batted: Left Threw: Left

MLB debut
- May 24, 2008, for the Washington Nationals

Last MLB appearance
- September 26, 2008, for the Washington Nationals

MLB statistics
- Win–loss record: 1-3
- Earned run average: 5.14
- Strikeouts: 37
- Stats at Baseball Reference

Teams
- Washington Nationals (2008)

Charles Nelson Manning (born March 31, 1979) is an American former professional baseball relief pitcher who last played for the Southern Maryland Blue Crabs. He played part of the 2008 season in Major League Baseball for the Washington Nationals. He went to the University of Tampa and is listed with a height of 6'2 and weight of 180 pounds. Manning throws and bats left-handed.

== Career ==
Manning was selected in the 9th round of the 2001 Major League Baseball draft by the New York Yankees. On July 31, 2003, Manning was traded to the Cincinnati Reds with Brandon Claussen for Aaron Boone. The Yankees re-acquired him on June 18, 2004, for Gabe White. Manning was a 2006 Eastern League Mid-Season All-Star. He spent the 2007 season with Double-A Trenton and Triple-A Scranton.

Manning became a minor league free agent after the 2007 season and signed with the Washington Nationals. On May 23, 2008, the Nationals called Manning up from Triple-A Columbus.

On October 15, 2008, Manning was picked up on waivers by the St. Louis Cardinals. He was acquired for use in spot relief situations against left-handed hitters, but did not make the Cardinals roster. In 2009, he pitched for the Memphis Redbirds, the Cardinals' top farm team. He became a free agent again after the season, and did not pitch again until joining the Southern Maryland Blue Crabs in the Atlantic League of Professional Baseball in 2011, who he played with from 2011 to 2013.
