= Kory Casto =

American baseball player (born 1981)

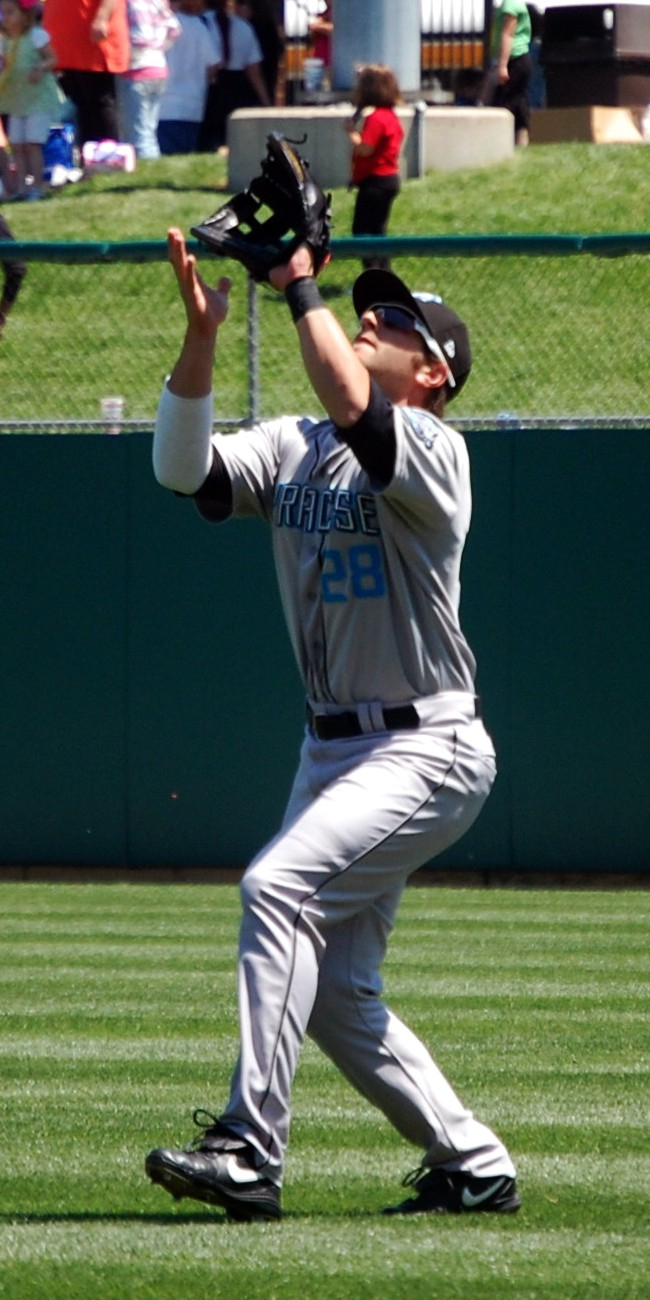
- Casto with the Syracuse Chiefs in 2009
- Outfielder
- Born: December 8, 1981 (age 44); Salem, Oregon, U.S.
- Batted: Left Threw: Right

MLB debut
- April 3, 2007, for the Washington Nationals

Last MLB appearance
- September 28, 2008, for the Washington Nationals

MLB statistics
- Batting average: .194
- Home runs: 2
- Runs batted in: 19
- Stats at Baseball Reference

Teams
- Washington Nationals (2007–2008)

Kory Christopher Casto (born December 8, 1981) is an American former professional baseball outfielder. He played in Major League Baseball (MLB) for the Washington Nationals from 2007 to 2008.

== Career ==
Casto began his career with the Washington Nationals. He made his Major League debut April 3, 2007, in a game against the Florida Marlins.

On January 14, 2010, Casto signed a minor league contract with an invite to spring training with the Detroit Tigers. Casto was released by Detroit following spring training. On May 20, Casto was signed by the Arizona Diamondbacks to a minor league contract. On July 31, Casto voluntarily retired.

Casto went to high school at North Marion High School in Aurora, Oregon.
