= Steven Shell =

American baseball player

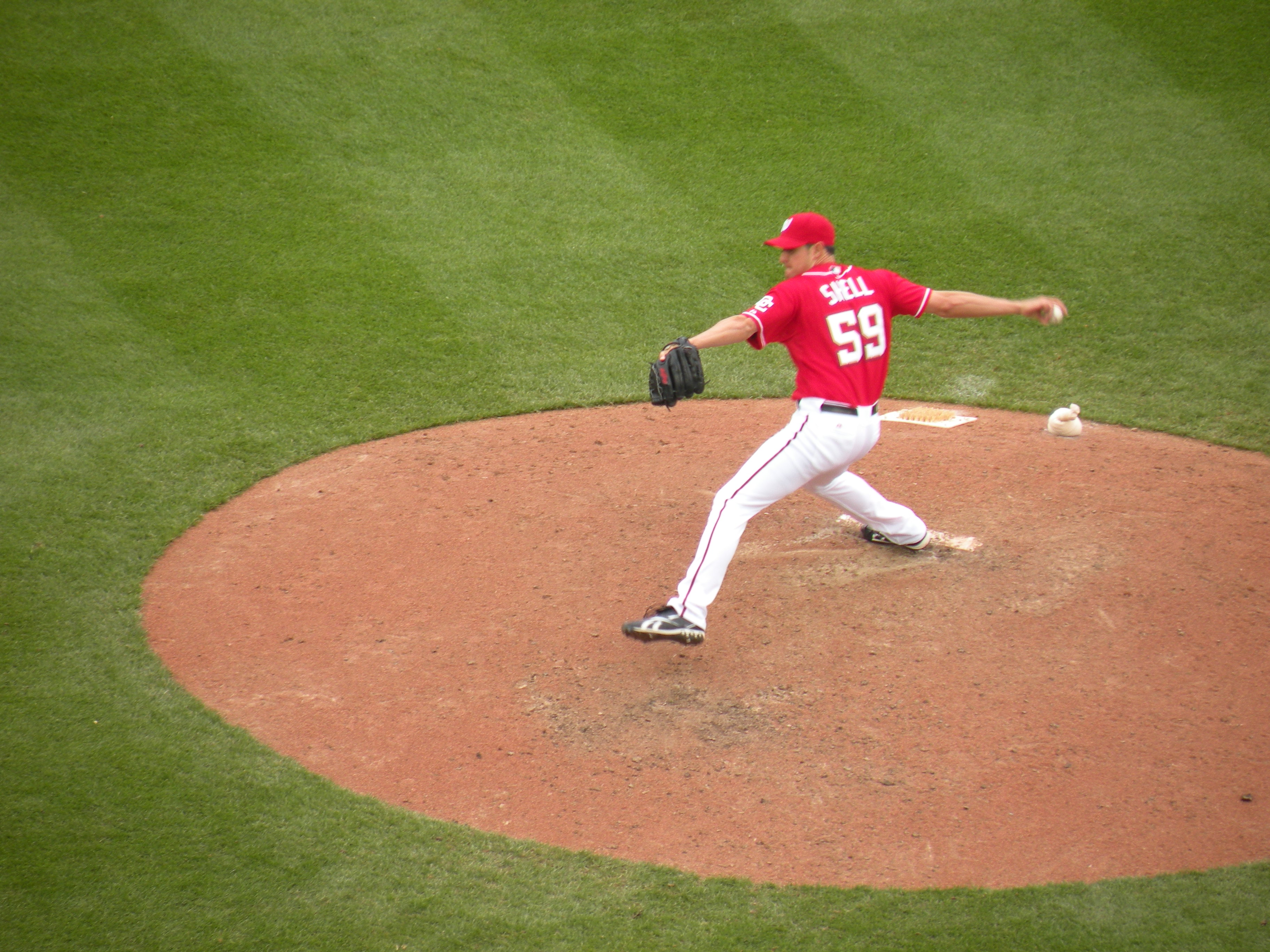
- Shell with the Washington Nationals
- Pitcher
- Born: March 10, 1983 (age 43); Longview, Texas, U.S.
- Batted: Right Threw: Right

MLB debut
- June 22, 2008, for the Washington Nationals

Last MLB appearance
- April 19, 2009, for the Washington Nationals

MLB statistics
- Win–loss record: 2–2
- Earned run average: 2.45
- Strikeouts: 46
- Stats at Baseball Reference

Teams
- Washington Nationals (2008–2009)

Steven Shell
Medal record

Men's baseball

Representing United States

Baseball World Cup
Gold medal – first place	2007 Tianmu	National team

Steven Daniel Shell (born March 10, 1983) is an American former Major League Baseball (MLB) pitcher. He made his major league debut on June 22, 2008.

== Playing career ==
=== Washington Nationals ===
Played high school ball in Minco and El Reno Oklahoma. His senior year he was named Oklahoma Gatorade Player of the Year. Shell was drafted straight out of high school in the 3rd round of the 2001 amateur draft by the Anaheim Angels. Shell pitched in the Angels organization from 2001–2007. In the off season of the 2007 season, Shell pitched for team USA and was the winning pitcher in the gold medal game verses Cuba. He became a minor league free agent after the 2007 season and signed a minor league contract with the Washington Nationals. On July 11, 2008, he set the Nationals' record for the longest save in club history. He pitched 3 scoreless innings against the Astros to get the record as well as his first career save. On April 29, 2009, Shell refused a minor league assignment and became a free agent.

=== Seattle Mariners ===
On May 3, 2009, Shell signed a minor league deal with the Seattle Mariners. He became a free agent following the season on November 9. He re-signed a new minor league contract with the Mariners on November 27. He became a free agent following the season on November 6.

=== Kansas City Royals ===
On November 18, 2010, Shell signed a minor league contract with the Kansas City Royals. On May 8, 2011, Shell was released.

=== Atlanta Braves ===
On May 19, 2011, he signed a minor league contract with the Atlanta Braves and was assigned to Triple-A Gwinnett the following day. He became a free agent following the season on November 2.

=== Post Playing Career ===
After leaving baseball in 2011, Shell is currently working as an Operations Tech for Husky Ventures.

== Personal life ==
Shell was married to model, internet blogger and fitness entrepreneur Kenna Shell from 2006 to 2015. The couple have one child, Tyler Shell, born on May 18, 2009. He now owns an oil business as well as a store in a cookie franchise in Yukon, Oklahoma.
