= Elijah Dukes =

American baseball player (born 1984)

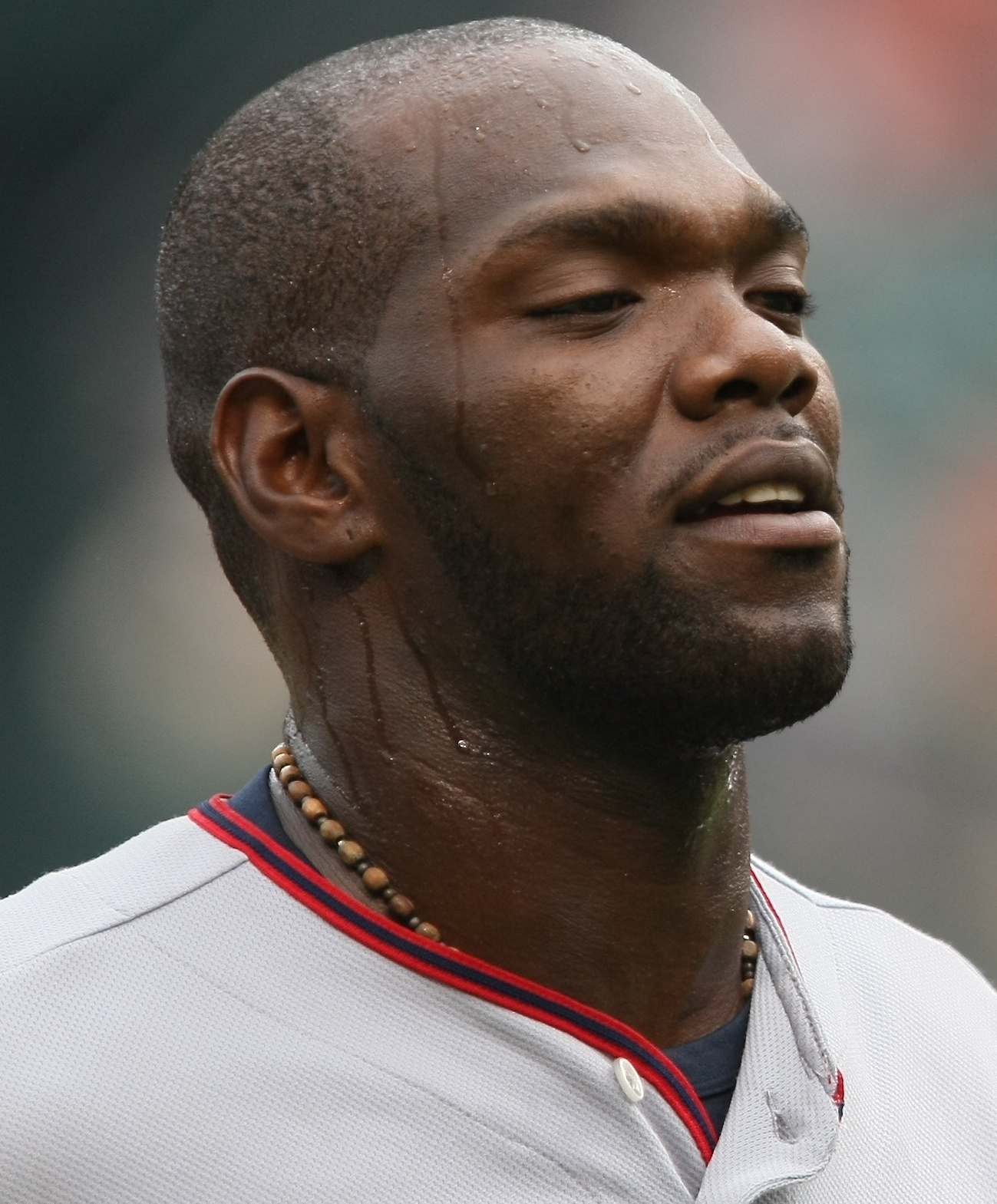
- Dukes with the Washington Nationals in 2009
- Outfielder
- Born: June 26, 1984 (age 42); Homestead, Florida, U.S.
- Batted: Right Threw: Right

MLB debut
- April 2, 2007, for the Tampa Bay Devil Rays

Last MLB appearance
- October 4, 2009, for the Washington Nationals

MLB statistics
- Batting average: .242
- Home runs: 31
- Runs batted in: 123
- Stats at Baseball Reference

Teams
- Tampa Bay Devil Rays (2007); Washington Nationals (2008–2009)

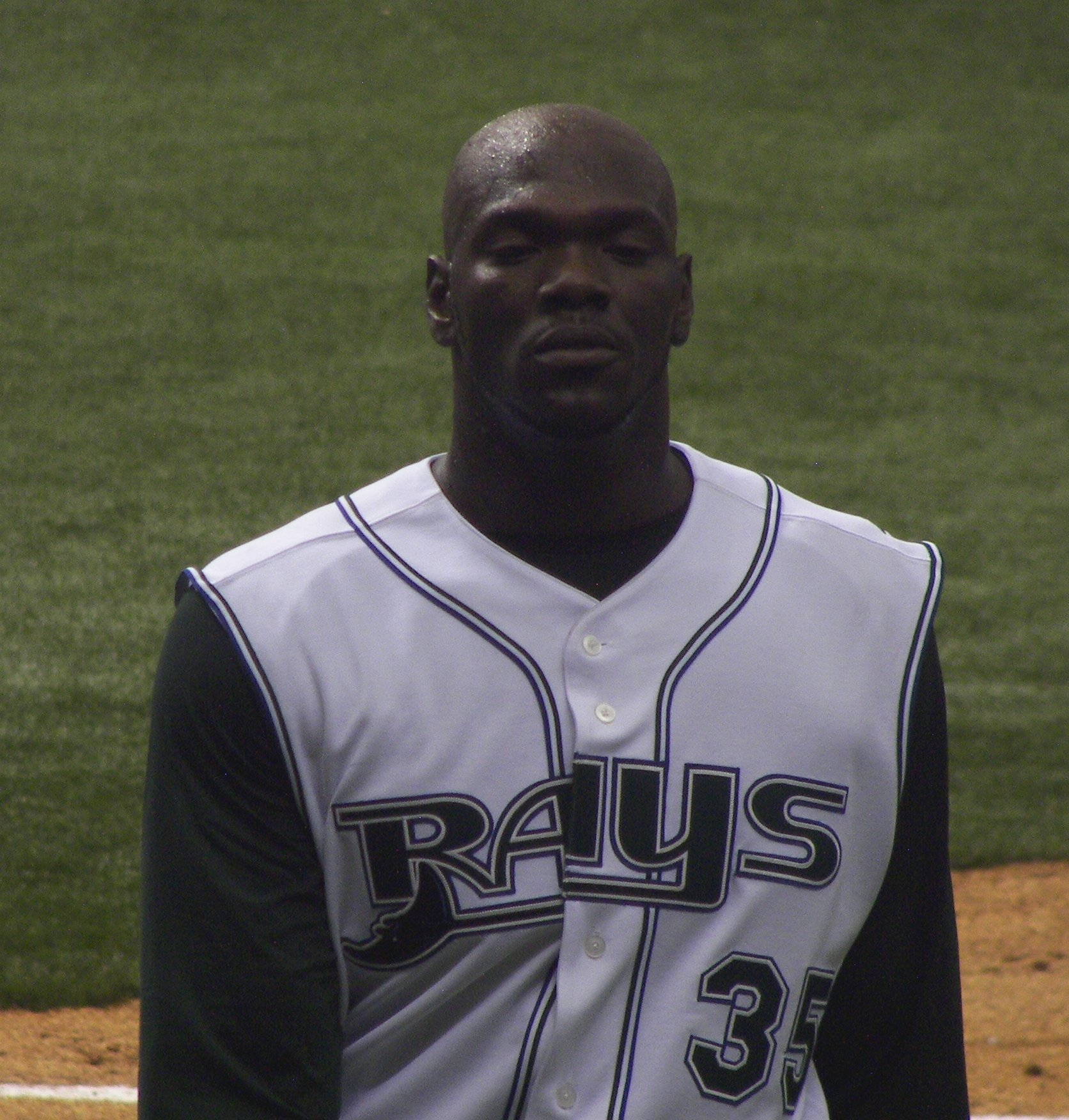
Dukes as a member of the Tampa Bay Devil Rays in 2007.

Elijah David Dukes, Jr. (born June 26, 1984) is an American former professional baseball player. A right-handed outfielder, he played in Major League Baseball for the Tampa Bay Devil Rays and Washington Nationals.

== Early life ==
Dukes attended Hillsborough High School in Tampa, Florida his junior and senior years, after spending his first two years of high school at Jefferson High School, C. Leon King High School, and George D. Chamberlain High School. He lettered for all four years in football and baseball and two years in basketball and track. In football, as a junior, he started at both tailback and middle linebacker, was named a Class 3A All-State selection as a linebacker, and rushed for over a thousand yards on offense. His Hillsborough Terriers made the state regional football semifinals during his junior year, and the quarterfinals his senior year. After finishing his high school career, he signed a national letter of intent to play football for North Carolina State University.

== Professional career ==
=== Tampa Bay Devil Rays (2003–2007) ===
Dukes was drafted by the Devil Rays in the third round of the 2002 Major League Baseball draft.

On April 2, 2007, in his first official at bat, Dukes got his first major league hit with a solo home run to center field in the fifth inning against the New York Yankees. In his second game, he hit his second home run en route to a victory versus the Yankees. On December 3, 2007, Dukes was acquired by the Washington Nationals for left-hander Glenn Gibson, a fourth-round draft pick in 2006 who was ranked among the Nationals' Top 10 prospects according to various baseball sources, including prospect authority Baseball America.

=== Washington Nationals (2008–2010) ===
Dukes injured his right hamstring on Opening Night and was placed on the disabled list, returning on May 9, 2008. He struggled offensively throughout May, batting a low .167 for the month.

Dukes rebounded in June, hitting .292 with 4 home runs for the month, before injuring his knee on July 5, 2008, in a game against the Cincinnati Reds. He had surgery on his knee, and then returned on July 31, 2008, much earlier than expected. Dukes landed on the disabled list yet again with a calf strain shortly thereafter, on August 7, 2008. Dukes returned to the Nationals on August 26, 2008, and hit .267 with 7 home runs and 26 RBI over his last 29 games.

Overall, Dukes hit for a .264 batting average, with a .386 on-base percentage, .478 slugging percentage, 13 home runs and 44 runs batted in with a total of 276 at bats in 81 games during the 2008 season.

Dukes was released by the Nationals on March 17, 2010.

=== Newark Bears (2010) ===
Following his release from the Nationals, Dukes reportedly agreed to a deal with the Tabasco Olmecas of the Mexican League in early April, but backed out after not showing up for a reporting date. Dukes signed with the Newark Bears of the Atlantic League of Professional Baseball on July 2, 2010. In 28 games he hit .366/.422/.584 with 5 home runs, 19 RBIs and 2 stolen bases.

== Off-the-field problems ==
In 1996, Dukes' father was convicted of second-degree murder. One year later, Dukes was arrested for the first time. Dukes has been arrested at least three times for battery, and once for assault. According to court records, he fathered at least five children with four women between 2003 and 2006.

On May 23, 2007, Dukes's wife NiShea Gilbert sought a restraining order against him after he threatened her life and the lives of their children. On May 2, Dukes had sent a photo of a gun to her cell phone and left her the following voicemail: "Hey, dawg. It's on, dawg. You dead, dawg. I ain't even bulls-------. Your kids too, dawg. It don't even matter to me who is in the car with you. Ni----, all I know is, ni----, when I see your motherf------ a-- riding, dawg, it's on. As a matter of fact, I'm coming to your motherf------ house." On June 12, a 17-year-old foster child who was living in the care of a relative of Dukes accused him of impregnating her. Police said the sex was apparently consensual. When the girl confronted Dukes to inform him about the pregnancy, he allegedly got angry and threw a bottle of Gatorade at her.

Dukes has received anger-management training. When Dukes was traded to the Nationals, the team also hired an ex-police officer in the role of "Special Assistant: Player Concerns". This person accompanied Dukes everywhere to ensure that he kept himself free of trouble.

Dukes was arrested in November 2010 for contempt due to failure to pay child support, on March 2, 2011, for assaulting a pregnant ex-girlfriend. and on January 22, 2013, for driving with a suspended license.

== See also ==
- Home run in first Major League at-bat
