= 2007 Washington Nationals season =

2007 Washington Nationals
- League: National League
- Division: East
- Ballpark: Robert F. Kennedy Memorial Stadium
- City: Washington, D.C.
- Owners: Lerner Enterprises
- General managers: Jim Bowden
- Managers: Manny Acta
- Television: MASN; WDCA (My 20); Bob Carpenter, Ray Knight, Don Sutton, Johnny Holliday
- Radio: WTWP/WWWT; Charlie Slowes, Dave Jageler

The 2007 Washington Nationals season began with the team trying to win its first National League East title since moving to Washington. During the offseason, the team replaced manager Frank Robinson with former Montreal Expos coach Manny Acta. They lost several players through free agency and trades. The most notable of those are José Guillén, Ramón Ortiz, Alfonso Soriano, and José Vidro. The Nationals signed few major league free agents. Their most experienced free agent signing was Dmitri Young. Luis Ayala, Alex Escobar, Cristian Guzmán, Nick Johnson, Michael O'Connor and John Patterson were expected to return from season-ending injuries.

After losing four starters (Liván Hernández, Tony Armas, Ramón Ortiz and Pedro Astacio) from the prior year, the Nationals invited an extraordinary 36 pitchers to spring training. By year's end, the team would become the first team in modern baseball (except for strike-shortened seasons) with no pitcher in double figures with wins or losses.

The season was notable for it being the Nationals final year at RFK Stadium and for Dmitri Young winning Major League Baseball Comeback Player of the Year Award, marking the team's first annual award since moving to D.C. The Nationals finished 73–89, 16 games behind the Philadelphia Phillies and fourth in the NL East. This was their only season in Washington prior to 2011 that the Nationals did not finish last in their division.

== Offseason ==
On December 18, 2006, the Nationals traded José Vidro and cash to the Seattle Mariners for Emiliano Fruto and Chris Snelling.

== Spring training ==
The Nationals held their 2007 spring training in Viera, Florida, with home games played at Space Coast Stadium. They invited Danny Ardoin to spring training, but he did not make the team; they traded him to the Houston Astros for minor-leaguer Wade Robinson on March 26, 2007.

== Regular season ==
=== April ===
On Opening Day, the Nationals lost their starting shortstop (Cristian Guzmán, hamstring) and center fielder (Nook Logan) for five weeks. At the end of April, one of their starters, Jerome Williams hurt his ankle while batting and was placed on the 15-day disabled list.

=== May ===
Hitting coach Mitchell Page left his post with the team in May due to a relapse of alcoholism.

In the space of just 10 days in May, Shawn Hill, John Patterson, and Jason Bergmann went on the disabled list. Jerome Williams returned, pitched one game, and went back on the DL with a shoulder injury. The Washington Post wrote: "Almost everything that could sink a team's attitude has befallen the Nats. They started the year 1-8, then they lost eight in a row to drop to 9-25."

They pressed journeymen Mike Bacsik, Micah Bowie (a relief pitcher) and Jason Simontacchi, along with rookie reliever Levale Speigner into the starting rotation, amidst predictions that the 2007 Nationals might equal the 1962 Mets' record of futility, 120 losses in one season.

After the team lost 8 straight games to sink to 9-25, the Nats won 11 of 15, mostly with patchwork starting pitching and timely hitting. and the return of Cristian Guzmán, who was hitting .343 by the end of May.

=== June ===
In June, the Nationals have been led by key hits by Dmitri Young, Cristian Guzmán and the power hitting of Ryan Zimmerman. But towards the end of the month, Guzman, hitting .329, was injured and lost for the season, and, following the injury, the Nationals lost 9 of their next 11 games.

=== July ===
Dmitri Young, hitting .339 (third in the league) and slugging .512, was selected as the lone Nationals' representative in the 2007 Major League Baseball All-Star Game. Despite rumors that the Nationals were seeking to trade Ronnie Belliard, Chad Cordero, Jon Rauch and Young, the Nationals did not make any major trades before the non-waiver trade deadline.

=== Season standings ===
==== National League East ====
NL East
Team	W	L	Pct.	GB	Home	Road
Philadelphia Phillies	89	73	.549	—	47‍–‍34	42‍–‍39
New York Mets	88	74	.543	1	41‍–‍40	47‍–‍34
Atlanta Braves	84	78	.519	5	44‍–‍37	40‍–‍41
Washington Nationals	73	89	.451	16	40‍–‍41	33‍–‍48
Florida Marlins	71	91	.438	18	36‍–‍45	35‍–‍46

==== Record vs. opponents ====
2007 National League record Source: MLB Standings Grid – 2007
Team	AZ	ATL	CHC	CIN	COL	FLA	HOU	LAD	MIL	NYM	PHI	PIT	SD	SF	STL	WAS	AL
Arizona	—	4–2	4–2	2–4	8–10	6–1	5–2	8–10	2–5	3–4	5–1	5–4	10–8	10–8	4–3	6–1	8–7
Atlanta	2–4	—	5–4	1–6	4–2	10–8	3–3	4–3	5–2	9–9	9–9	5–1	5–2	4–3	3–4	11–7	4–11
Chicago	2–4	4–5	—	9–9	5–2	0–6	8–7	2–5	9–6	2–5	3–4	8–7	3–5	5–2	11–5	6–1	8–4
Cincinnati	4–2	6–1	9–9	—	2–4	4–3	4–11	2–4	8–7	2–5	2–4	9–7	2–4	4–3	6–9	1–6	7-11
Colorado	10–8	2–4	2–5	4–2	—	3–3	3–4	12–6	4–2	4–2	4–3	4–3	11–8	10–8	3–4	4–3	10–8
Florida	1–6	8–10	6–0	3–4	3–3	—	2–3	4–3	2–5	7–11	9–9	3–4	3–4	1–6	2–4	8–10	9–9
Houston	2–5	3–3	7–8	11–4	4–3	3-2	—	4–3	5–13	2–5	3–3	5–10	4–3	2–4	7–9	2–5	9–9
Los Angeles	10–8	3–4	5–2	4–2	6–12	3–4	3–4	—	3–3	5–5	4–2	5–2	8–10	10–8	3–3	5–1	5–10
Milwaukee	5–2	2–5	6–9	7–8	2–4	5–2	13–5	3–3	—	2–4	3–4	10–6	2–5	4–5	7–8	4–2	8–7
New York	4–3	9–9	5–2	5–2	2–4	11–7	5–2	5–5	4–2	—	6–12	4–2	2–4	4–2	5–2	9–9	8–7
Philadelphia	1-5	9–9	4–3	4–2	3–4	9–9	3–3	2–4	4–3	12–6	—	4–2	4–3	4–4	6–3	12–6	8–7
Pittsburgh	4–5	1–5	7–8	7–9	3–4	4–3	10–5	2–5	6–10	2–4	2–4	—	1–6	4–2	6–12	4–2	5–10
San Diego	8–10	2–5	5–3	4–2	8–11	4–3	3–4	10–8	5–2	4–2	3–4	6–1	—	14–4	3–4	4–2	6–9
San Francisco	8–10	3–4	2–5	3–4	8–10	6–1	4–2	8–10	5–4	2–4	4–4	2–4	4–14	—	4–1	3–4	5–10
St. Louis	3–4	4–3	5–11	9–6	4–3	4-2	9–7	3–3	8–7	2–5	3–6	12–6	4–3	1–4	—	1–5	6–9
Washington	1–6	7–11	1–6	6–1	3–4	10-8	5–2	1–5	2–4	9–9	6–12	2–4	2–4	4–3	5–1	—	9–9

Nationals vs. American League
Team	AL East		AL Central		
Team	BAL	TOR	CLE	DET	MIN
Washington	4–2	2-1	0-3	2-1	1-2

=== Opening Day lineup ===
Opening Day Starters
Name	Position
Felipe López	Second baseman
Cristian Guzmán	Shortstop
Ryan Zimmerman	Third baseman
Austin Kearns	Right fielder
Dmitri Young	First baseman
Brian Schneider	Catcher
Ryan Church	Left fielder
Nook Logan	Center fielder
John Patterson	Starting pitcher

=== Notable transactions ===
- April 13, 2007: The Nationals received minor-leaguer Brent Abernathy from the Philadelphia Phillies as part of a conditional deal.
- April 20, 207: The Nationals received Manny Alexander from the San Diego Padres as part of a conditional deal.
- May 2, 2007: The Nationals traded Chris Snelling to the Oakland Athletics for Ryan Langerhans.
- June 20, 2007: The Nationals sold Anastacio Martínez to the Detroit Tigers.
- June 24, 2007: The Nationals traded minor-leaguer Darnell McDonald to the Minnesota Twins for Levale Speigner. The move allowed the Nationals to keep Speigner – a Rule 5 draft pick – when they outrighted him to the Triple A Columbus Clippers.
- June 26, 2007: The Nationals sent minor-leaguer Jermaine Van Buren to the Oakland Athletics as part of a conditional deal.
- August 17, 2007: The Nationals traded a player to be named later to the Boston Red Sox for Wily Mo Peña and cash.
- August 21, 2007: The Nationals traded minor-leaguer Emiliano Fruto to the Arizona Diamondbacks for minor-leaguer Chris Carter, and sent Carter to the Boston Red Sox to complete the August 17, 2007, trade.
- September 4, 2007: The Nationals traded Ray King to the Milwaukee Brewers for a player to be named later. The Brewers sent minor-leaguer Andrew Lefave to the Nationals on September 14, 2007, to complete the trade.

=== Draft ===
The 2007 Major League Baseball draft took place on June 7 and 8. With their first pick – the sixth pick overall – the Nationals selected pitcher Ross Detwiler. Other notable players the Nationals selected were pitcher Jordan Zimmermann (second round, 67th overall), left fielder-third baseman Jake Smolinski (second round, 70th overall), third baseman Steven Souza Jr. (third round, 100th overall), catcher Derek Norris (fourth round, 130th overall), and pitcher Pat McCoy (10th round, 310th overall).

=== Roster ===
2007 Washington Nationals
Roster
Pitchers: 63 Winston Abreu; 53 Jonathan Albaladejo; 56 Luis Ayala; 37 Mike Bacsik; 57 Jason Bergmann; 30 Chris Booker; 59 Micah Bowie; 47 Matt Chico; 43 Jesús Colomé; 32 Chad Cordero; 29 Ross Detwiler; 38 Joel Hanrahan; 41 Shawn Hill; 26 John Lannan; 67 Arnie Muñoz; 22 John Patterson; 51 Jon Rauch; 17 Tim Redding; 52 Saúl Rivera; 45 Chris Schroder; 50 Jason Simontacchi; 36 Levale Speigner; 40 Billy Traber; 35 Ryan Wagner; 26 Jerome Williams	Catchers: 3 Jesús Flores; 23 Brian Schneider; Infielders: 77 Tony Batista; 10 Ronnie Belliard; 13 Robert Fick; 15 Cristian Guzmán; 4,6 D'Angelo Jiménez; 2 Felipe López; 12 Josh Wilson; 21,42 Dmitri Young; 11 Ryan Zimmerman; Outfielders: 5 Kory Casto; 19 Ryan Church; 25 Austin Kearns; 4 Ryan Langerhans; 7 Nook Logan; 16 Justin Maxwell; 16,26 Wily Mo Peña; 29 Michael Restovich; 8 Chris Snelling; 00 Brandon Watson	Manager: 14 Manny Acta; Coaches: 27 Rick Aponte (bullpen); 39 Pat Corrales (bench); 9 Lenny Harris (hitting, interim); 28 Jerry Morales (first base); -- Mitchell Page (hitting coach) (until May); 46 Randy St. Claire (pitching); 18 Tim Tolman (third base)

=== Attendance ===
The Nationals drew 1,943,812 fans at Robert F. Kennedy Memorial Stadium in 2007, placing them 14th in attendance for the season among the 16 National League teams.

=== Game log ===
2007 game log
April (9-17)

#	Date	Opponent	Score	Win	Loss	Save	Attendance	Record
1	April 2	Marlins	9 – 2	Willis (1-0)	Patterson (0-1)		40,389	0-1
2	April 3	Marlins	9 – 3	Olsen (1-0)	Hill (0-1)		20,894	0-2
3	April 4	Marlins	7 – 6	Rauch (1-0)	Julio (0-1)		18,835	1-2
4	April 5	D-backs	4 – 3	González (1-0)	Bergmann (0-1)	Valverde (2)	16,017	1-3
5	April 6	D-backs	7 – 1	Owings (1-0)	Williams (0-1)		19,234	1-4
6	April 7	D-backs	7 – 1	Webb (1-0)	Patterson (0-2)		16,617	1-5
7	April 8	D-backs	3 – 1	Hernández (1-0)	Hill (0-2)	Valverde (3)	17,244	1-6
8	April 10	@ Braves	8 – 0	Hudson (1-0)	Chico (0-1)		18,396	1-7
9	April 11	@ Braves	8 – 3	James (2-0)	Williams (0-2)		15,631	1-8
10	April 12	@ Braves	2 – 0	Colomé (1-0)	Smoltz (1-1)	Cordero (1)	23,897	2-8
11	April 13	@ Mets	3 – 2	Heilman (1-1)	R. Wagner (0-1)	B. Wagner (3)	47,311	2-9
12	April 14	@ Mets	6 – 2	Hill (1-2)	Hernández (1-1)		53,560	3-9
--	April 15	@ Mets	Postponed (rain) Rescheduled for July 28 as part of a doubleheader					3-9
13	April 16	Braves	5 – 1	Chico (1-1)	James (2-1)		16,316	4-9
14	April 17	Braves	6 – 4	Smoltz (2-1)	Williams (0-3)	Wickman (4)	17,791	4-10
15	April 18	Phillies	5 – 4 (13)	Speigner (1-0)	Rosario (0-1)		18,584	5-10
16	April 19	Phillies	4 – 2	Moyer (2-1)	Patterson (0-3)	Gordon (3)	18,671	5-11
17	April 20	@ Marlins	6 – 5 (14)	Colomé (2-0)	Gardner (0-1)	Rivera (1)	16,469	6-11
18	April 21	@ Marlins	9 – 3	Sánchez (2-0)	Chico (1-2)		24,107	6-12
19	April 22	@ Marlins	12 – 6	Obermueller (1-0)	Williams (0-4)	Gregg (1)	18,443	6-13
20	April 24	@ Phillies	6 – 3	Alfonseca (1-0)	Bowie (0-1)	Gordon (4)	24,745	6-14
21	April 25	@ Phillies	9 – 3	Lieber (1-0)	Patterson (0-4)		23,526	6-15
22	April 26	@ Phillies	4 – 2	Hill (2-2)	Hamels (2-1)	Cordero (2)	26,572	7-15
23	April 27	Mets	4 – 3	Chico (2-2)	Pérez (2-2)	Cordero (3)	21,662	8-15
24	April 28	Mets	6 – 2 (12)	Sele (1-0)	Rivera (0-1)		29,292	8-16
25	April 29	Mets	1 – 0	Maine (4-0)	Bergmann (0-2)	B. Wagner (4)	27,361	8-17
26	April 30	@ Padres	3 – 2	Patterson (1-4)	Peavy (3-1)	Cordero (4)	19,769	9-17

May (13-15)

#	Date	Opponent	Score	Win	Loss	Save	Attendance	Record
27	May 1	@ Padres	3 – 0	Young (3-2)	Hill (2-3)	Hoffman (6)	19,438	9-18
28	May 2	@ Padres	7 – 3	Brocail (2-0)	Chico (2-3)		22,153	9-19
29	May 4	@ Cubs	6 – 4	Zambrano (3-2)	Bergmann (0-3)	Dempster (6)	39,444	9-20
30	May 5	@ Cubs	5 – 3	R. Hill (4-1)	Patterson (1-5)	Dempster (7)	40,267	9-21
31	May 6	@ Cubs	4 – 3 (10)	Dempster (1-1)	Wagner (0-2)		40,481	9-22
32	May 7	@ Brewers	3 – 0	Capuano (5-0)	Chico (2-4)	F. Cordero (13)	17,751	9-23
33	May 8	@ Brewers	6 – 4	Bush (3-3)	Simontacchi (0-1)	F. Cordero (14)	19,398	9-24
34	May 9	@ Brewers	3 – 1	Turnbow (1-0)	Bowie (0-2)	F. Cordero (15)	24,658	9-25
35	May 11	Marlins	6 – 0	Hill (3-3)	Olsen (3-3)		23,006	10-25
36	May 12	Marlins	7 – 3	Rauch (2-0)	Tankersley (2-1)		19,278	11-25
37	May 13	Marlins	6 – 4	Simontacchi (1-1)	Obermueller (1-2)	Rauch (1)	20,486	12-25
38	May 14	Braves	2 – 1	Bergmann (1-3)	Smoltz (5-2)	Colomé (1)	18,829	13-25
39	May 15	Braves	6 – 2	Hudson (5-1)	Williams (0-5)		21,258	13-26
40	May 16	Braves	6 – 4	Traber (1-0)	Davies (1-2)	Rauch (2)	20,329	14-26
41	May 17	Braves	4 – 3	Chico (3-4)	Paronto (2-1)	Rauch (3)	24,631	15-26
42	May 18	Orioles	5 – 4	Trachsel (2-3)	Simontacchi (1-2)	Ray (9)	22,375	15-27
43	May 19	Orioles	3 – 2 (11)	Parrish (2-0)	Abreu (0-1)	Ray (10)	30,661	15-28
44	May 20	Orioles	4 – 3	Colomé (3-0)	Báez (0-3)	Cordero (5)	29,281	16-28
45	May 21	@ Reds	8 – 7	Coutlangus (2-0)	Rauch (2-1)	Weathers (9)	15,271	16-29
46	May 22	@ Reds	8 – 4	Colomé (4-0)	Coutlangus (2-1)		16,732	17-29
47	May 23	@ Reds	12 – 7	Simontacchi (2-2)	Lohse (1-6)		31,971	18-29
48	May 24	@ Reds	4 – 3	Bacsik (1-0)	Belisle (4-4)	Cordero (6)	19,541	19-29
49	May 25	@ Cardinals	5 – 4	Bowie (1-2)	Reyes (0-8)	Cordero (7)	43,618	20-29
50	May 26	@ Cardinals	8 – 6	Thompson (3-1)	Speigner (1-1)	Isringhausen (13)	44,270	20-30
51	May 27	@ Cardinals	7 – 2	Rivera (1-1)	Wainwright (4-4)		44,578	21-30
52	May 29	Dodgers	10 – 0	Penny (7-1)	Simontacchi (2-3)		18,483	21-31
53	May 30	Dodgers	5 – 0	Lowe (5-5)	Bacsik (1-1)		22,360	21-32
54	May 31	Dodgers	11 – 4	Bowie (2-2)	Hendrickson (2-3)		20,982	22-32

June (10-16)

#	Date	Opponent	Score	Win	Loss	Save	Attendance	Record
55	June 1	Padres	4 – 3 (10)	Rauch (3-1)	Meredith (2-3)		22,354	23-32
56	June 2	Padres	11 – 3	Germano (4-0)	Speigner (1-2)		21,635	23-33
57	June 3	Padres	7 – 3	Wells (3-3)	Simontacchi (2-4)		26,967	23-34
58	June 5	Pirates	7 – 6	Chacón (2-0)	Bacsik (1-2)	Capps (2)	19,169	23-35
59	June 6	Pirates	6 – 5	Cordero (1-0)	Torres (0-3)		24,755	24-35
60	June 7	Pirates	3 – 2	Capps (3-2)	Cordero (1-1)		25,622	24-36
61	June 8	@ Twins	8 – 5	Simontacchi (3-4)	Silva (3-7)	Rivera (2)	25,144	25-36
62	June 9	@ Twins	3 – 1	Speigner (2-2)	Santana (6-6)	Cordero (8)	39,742	26-36
63	June 10	@ Twins	6 – 3	Bonser (5-2)	Bacsik (1-3)	Nathan (14)	31,035	26-37
64	June 12	@ Orioles	7 – 4	Bowie (3-2)	Cabrera (5-7)	Cordero (9)	21,151	27-37
65	June 13	@ Orioles	9 – 6 (11)	Traber (2-0)	Ray (3-5)	Rivera (3)	21,782	28-37
66	June 14	@ Orioles	3 – 1	Simontacchi (4-4)	Bradford (0-3)	Cordero (10)	20,770	29-37
67	June 15	@ Blue Jays	7 – 2	Halladay (7-2)	Bacsik (1-4)		22,042	29-38
68	June 16	@ Blue Jays	7 – 3	Marcum (4-2)	Speigner (2-3)		26,342	29-39
69	June 17	@ Blue Jays	4 – 2	Bowie (4-2)	Towers (6-6)	Cordero (11)	28,867	30-39
70	June 18	Tigers	9 – 8	Maroth (5-2)	Chico (3-5)		22,562	30-40
71	June 19	Tigers	15 – 1	Durbin (6-3)	Simontacchi (4-5)		22,227	30-41
72	June 20	Tigers	8 – 4	Bonderman (8-0)	Rivera (1-2)		26,637	30-42
73	June 22	Indians	4 – 1	Rivera (2-2)	Carmona (8-3)	Cordero (12)	24,534	31-42
74	June 23	Indians	4 – 3	Mastny (5-2)	Cordero (1-2)	Borowski (21)	32,539	31-43
75	June 24	Indians	3 – 1	Simontacchi (5-5)	Westbrook (1-3)	Cordero (13)	26,413	32-43
76	June 25	@ Braves	4 – 1	Hudson (7-5)	Bergmann (1-4)	Wickman (13)	25,375	32-44
77	June 26	@ Braves	6 – 2	Carlyle (2-2)	Bacsik (1-5)	Wickman (14)	22,508	32-45
78	June 27	@ Braves	13 – 0	Smoltz (9-4)	Bowie (4-3)		29,144	32-46
79	June 29	@ Pirates	3 – 2	Capps (4-4)	Rauch (3-2)		32,361	32-47
80	June 30	@ Pirates	7 – 2	Gorzelanny (8-4)	Bergmann (1-5)		26,959	32-48

July (14-12)

#	Date	Opponent	Score	Win	Loss	Save	Attendance	Record
81	July 1	@ Pirates	3 – 2	Bacsik (2-5)	Maholm (4-11)	Cordero (14)	19,149	33-48
82	July 2	Cubs	7 – 2	Lilly (7-4)	Simontacchi (5-6)		24,015	33-49
83	July 3	Cubs	3 – 1	Zambrano (10-6)	Redding (0-1)	Howry (3)	30,106	33-50
84	July 4	Cubs	6 – 0	Chico (4-5)	Hill (5-6)		39,207	34-50
85	July 5	Cubs	4 – 2	Ohman (1-4)	Ayala (0-1)	Howry (4)	22,594	34-51
86	July 6	Brewers	6 – 2	Bush (7-7)	Bacsik (2-6)		18,961	34-52
87	July 7	Brewers	5 – 4	Simontacchi (6-6)	Suppan (8-8)	C. Cordero (15)	24,774	35-52
88	July 8	Brewers	7 – 2	Redding (1-1)	Capuano (5-6)		20,637	36-52
All–Star Break (July 9–11)
89	July 13	@ Marlins	14 – 10	Rivera (3-2)	Willis (7-8)		11,438	37-52
90	July 14	@ Marlins	5 – 2	Mitre (4-4)	Chico (4-6)	Gregg (19)	21,012	37-53
91	July 15	@ Marlins	5 – 3	Olsen (7-7)	Simontacchi (6-7)	Gregg (20)	12,119	37-54
92	July 16	Astros	4 – 3	Rivera (4-2)	Williams (4-11)	Cordero (16)	22,392	38-54
93	July 17	Astros	4 – 2	Sampson (7-6)	Redding (1-2)	Lidge (1)	22,362	38-55
94	July 18	Astros	7 – 6	Bergmann (2-5)	Jennings (1-6)	Cordero (17)	27,119	39-55
95	July 19	Rockies	5 – 4 (10)	Rauch (4-2)	Hawkins (1-5)		20,573	40-55
96	July 20	Rockies	3 – 1	Cook (6-6)	Traber (2-1)	Corpas (4)	27,581	40-56
97	July 21	Rockies	3 – 0	Bacsik (3-6)	R. López (5-3)	Cordero (18)	31,674	41-56
98	July 22	Rockies	3 – 0	Rauch (5-2)	Julio (0-3)	Cordero (19)	21,793	42-56
99	July 24	@ Phillies	4 – 3	Madson (2-2)	Ayala (0-2)	Alfonseca (8)	40,110	42-57
100	July 25	@ Phillies	7 – 5 (14)	Condrey (4-0)	Booker (0-1)		44,931	42-58
101	July 26	@ Phillies	7 – 6	Rauch (6-2)	Mesa (1-3)	Cordero (20)	43,413	43-58
102	July 27	@ Mets	6 – 2	Bacsik (4-6)	Sosa (7-6)		51,179	44-58
103	July 28 (1)	@ Mets	3 – 1	Hernández (7-4)	Rivera (4-3)	Wagner (24)	51,947	44-59
104	July 28 (2)	@ Mets	6 – 5	Rauch (7-2)	Feliciano (2-2)	Cordero (21)	46,265	45-59
105	July 29	@ Mets	5 – 0 (5)	Maine (12-5)	Traber (2-2)		47,264	45-60
106	July 31	Reds	6 – 3	Chico (5-6)	Livingston (2-2)	Cordero (22)	20,165	46-60

August (12-17)

#	Date	Opponent	Score	Win	Loss	Save	Attendance	Record
107	August 1	Reds	7 – 2	Lannan (1-0)	Arroyo (4-12)		28,944	47-60
108	August 2	Reds	7 – 3	Bacsik (5-6)	Dumatrait (0-1)		26,223	48-60
109	August 3	Cardinals	3 – 2	Cordero (2-2)	Franklin (4-1)		27,992	49-60
110	August 4	Cardinals	12 – 1	Hanrahan (1-0)	Piñeiro (1-2)		29,252	50-60
111	August 5	Cardinals	6 – 3	King (1-0)	Franklin (4-2)	Cordero (23)	33,517	51-60
112	August 6	@ Giants	3 – 2 (11)	Hennessey (2-3)	King (1-1)		43,052	51-61
113	August 7	@ Giants	8 – 6	Schroder (1-0)	Correia (1-6)	Cordero (24)	43,154	52-61
114	August 8	@ Giants	5 – 0	Cain (4-12)	Redding (1-3)		42,991	52-62
115	August 9	@ Giants	3 – 1	Hanrahan (2-0)	Misch (0-2)	Cordero (25)	41,555	53-62
116	August 10	@ D-backs	11 – 4	Hernández (8-7)	Rivera (4-4)		31,110	53-63
117	August 11	@ D-backs	1 – 0	Webb (12-8)	Lannan (1-1)		32,121	53-64
118	August 12	@ D-backs	7 – 6	Rauch (8-2)	Valverde (1-4)	Cordero (26)	29,839	54-64
119	August 14	Phillies	3 – 2	Alfonseca (4-1)	Rauch (8-3)	Myers (10)	27,128	54-65
120	August 15	Phillies	4 – 2	Redding (2-3)	Kendrick (5-3)	Cordero (27)	25,575	55-65
121	August 16	Phillies	4 – 2	Hamels (14-5)	Hanrahan (2-1)	Myers (11)	27,308	55-66
122	August 17	Mets	6 – 2	Glavine (11-6)	Chico (5-7)		23,636	55-67
123	August 18	Mets	7 – 4	Pérez (11-8)	Lannan (1-2)	Wagner (29)	35,157	55-68
124	August 19	Mets	8 – 2	Hernández (8-4)	Rauch (8-4)		29,092	55-69
125	August 20	@ Astros	7 – 0	Redding (3-3)	Jennings (2-9)		30,374	56-69
126	August 21	@ Astros	11 – 6	Hanrahan (3-1)	Rodríguez (7-12)		34,073	57-69
127	August 22	@ Astros	3 – 2	Williams (8-12)	Bacsik (5-7)	Lidge (12)	32,023	57-70
128	August 23	@ Astros	7 – 6	Lannan (2-2)	Gutiérrez (0-1)	Cordero (28)	36,407	58-70
129	August 24	@ Rockies	6 – 5	Fuentes (1-5)	Cordero (2-3)		25,232	58-71
130	August 25	@ Rockies	5 – 1	U. Jiménez (3-2)	Redding (3-4)		27,179	58-72
131	August 26	@ Rockies	10 – 5	Dessens (2-1)	Hanrahan (3-2)		24,086	58-73
132	August 27	@ Dodgers	5 – 4	Lowe (11-11)	Bacsik (5-8)	Saito (35)	46,944	58-74
133	August 28	@ Dodgers	4 – 3	Billingsley (9-4)	Schroder (1-1)	Saito (36)	49,698	58-75
134	August 29	@ Dodgers	10 – 9 (12)	Proctor (5-5)	Rivera (4-5)		41,913	58-76
135	August 31	Giants	3 – 2	Correia (3-6)	Redding (3-5)	Hennessey (17)	25,169	58-77

September (15-12)

#	Date	Opponent	Score	Win	Loss	Save	Attendance	Record
136	September 1	Giants	4 – 1	Hanrahan (4-2)	Sánchez (1-3)	Cordero (29)	30,221	59-77
137	September 2	Giants	2 – 1	Cordero (3-3)	Wilson (1-1)		27,310	60-77
138	September 3	Marlins	6 – 3	Bergmann (3-5)	VandenHurk (4-5)	Cordero (30)	27,592	61-77
139	September 4	Marlins	4 – 3	Schroder (2-1)	Gregg (0-5)		15,611	62-77
140	September 5	Marlins	6 – 4	Ayala (1-2)	Lindstrom (2-4)	Cordero (31)	19,222	63-77
141	September 7	@ Braves	7 – 1	Smoltz (13-7)	Hanrahan (4-2)		31,116	63-78
142	September 8	@ Braves	9 – 2	James (10-10)	Chico (5-8)		36,940	63-79
143	September 9	@ Braves	7 – 4	Bergmann (4-5)	Cormier (2-5)	Cordero (32)	31,582	64-79
144	September 10	@ Marlins	5 – 4	Hill (4-3)	Olsen (9-13)	Cordero (33)	12,345	65-79
145	September 11	@ Marlins	13 – 8	Lindstrom (3-4)	Schroder (2-2)		11,078	65-80
146	September 12	@ Marlins	5 – 4 (12)	Barone (1-2)	Rivera (4-6)		10,121	65-81
147	September 14	Braves	8 – 5 (13)	Ascanio (1-1)	Colomé (4-1)		18,568	65-82
148	September 15	Braves	7 – 4	Bergmann (5-5)	Cormier (2-6)	Cordero (34)	26,866	66-82
149	September 16	Braves	3 – 0	Hudson (16-8)	Hill (4-4)		23,935	66-83
150	September 17	Mets	12 – 4	Albaladejo (1-0)	Sele (3-2)		18,678	67-83
151	September 18	Mets	9 – 8	Colomé (5-1)	Maine (14-10)	Cordero (35)	19,966	68-83
152	September 19	Mets	8 – 4	Pelfrey (3-7)	Chico (5-9)		20,558	68-84
153	September 20	Phillies	7 – 6	Romero (2-2)	Albaladejo (1-1)	Myers (18)	19,966	68-85
154	September 21	Phillies	6 – 3	Eaton (10-9)	Hill (4-5)	Myers (19)	26,949	68-86
155	September 22	Phillies	4 – 1 (10)	Myers (5-7)	Schroder (2-3)	Condrey (2)	26,412	68-87
156	September 23	Phillies	5 – 3	Ayala (2-2)	Alfonseca (5-2)	Cordero (36)	40,519	69-87
157	September 24	@ Mets	13 – 4	Chico (6-9)	Pelfrey (3-8)		49,164	70-87
158	September 25	@ Mets	10 – 9	Bergmann (6-5)	Glavine (13-7)	Rauch (4)	49,244	71-87
159	September 26	@ Mets	9 – 6	Hanrahan (5-3)	Smith (3-2)	Ayala (1)	51,940	72-87
160	September 28	@ Phillies	6 – 0	Hamels (15-5)	Redding (3-6)		45,084	72-88
161	September 29	@ Phillies	4 – 2	Chico (7-9)	Eaton (10-10)	Cordero (37)	44,532	73-88
162	September 30	@ Phillies	6 – 1	Moyer (14-12)	Bergmann (6-6)		44,865	73-89

== Player stats ==
=== Batting ===
Note: Pos = Position; G = Games played; AB = At bats; R = Runs scored; H = Hits; 2B = Doubles; 3B = Triples; HR = Home runs; RBI = Runs batted in; AVG = Batting average; SB = Stolen bases

Complete offensive statistics are available here.

Pos	Player	G	AB	R	H	2B	3B	HR	RBI	AVG	SB
C	Brian Schneider	129	408	33	96	21	1	6	54	.235	0
1B	Dmitri Young	136	460	57	147	38	1	13	74	.320	0
2B	Ronnie Belliard	147	511	57	148	35	1	11	58	.290	3
SS	Felipe López	154	603	70	148	25	6	9	50	.245	24
3B	Ryan Zimmerman	162	653	99	174	43	5	24	91	.266	4
LF	Ryan Church	144	470	57	128	43	1	15	70	.272	3
CF	Nook Logan	118	325	39	86	18	4	0	21	.265	23
RF	Austin Kearns	161	587	84	156	35	1	16	74	.266	2
RF	Robert Fick	118	197	24	46	6	1	2	16	.234	0
C	Jesus Flores	79	180	21	44	9	0	4	25	.244	0
SS	Christian Guzmán	46	174	31	57	6	6	2	14	.328	2
CF	Ryan Langerhans	103	162	24	32	6	2	6	22	.198	3
LF	Wily Mo Peña	37	133	24	39	4	0	8	22	.293	2
IF	D'Angelo Jiménez	73	102	14	25	7	0	2	10	.245	2
1B	Tony Batista	80	101	10	26	3	0	2	16	.257	0
LF	Chris Snelling	24	49	6	10	1	1	1	7	.204	0
UT	Kory Casto	16	54	1	7	2	0	0	3	.130	0
OF	Michael Restovich	15	28	0	4	1	0	0	1	.143	0
OF	Justin Maxwell	15	26	5	7	0	0	2	5	.269	0
SS	Josh Wilson	15	19	3	1	0	0	0	0	.053	0
OF	Brandon Watson	5	18	2	5	1	0	0	2	.278	1
P	Matt Chico	31	48	1	8	0	0	0	3	.167	0
P	Jason Bergmann	22	37	2	5	0	0	0	0	.135	0
P	Shawn Hill	16	26	2	2	0	0	0	0	.077	0
P	Mike Bacsik	29	29	1	3	1	0	0	1	.103	0
P	Tim Redding	15	28	1	2	1	0	0	2	.071	0
P	Jason Simontacchi	13	19	1	1	0	0	0	0	.053	0
P	Joel Hanrahan	12	14	3	4	2	1	0	3	.286	0
P	John Lannan	6	13	1	2	1	0	0	1	.154	0
P	Micah Bowie	30	11	0	1	0	0	0	1	.091	0
P	John Patterson	7	10	0	0	0	0	0	0	.000	0
P	Jerome Williams	6	7	0	1	0	0	0	0	.143	0
P	Levale Speigner	19	4	0	0	0	0	0	0	.000	0
P	Billy Traber	28	4	0	0	0	0	0	0	.000	0
P	Jon Rauch	88	3	0	0	0	0	0	0	.000	0
P	Saúl Rivera	85	1	0	0	0	0	0	0	.000	0
P	Winston Abreu	26	2	0	0	0	0	0	0	.000	0
P	Chris Schroder	37	2	0	0	0	0	0	0	.000	0
P	Chad Cordero	76	1	0	0	0	0	0	0	.000	0
P	Jesús Colomé	61	1	0	0	0	0	0	0	.000	0
P	Chris Booker	3	0	0	0	0	0	0	0	–	0
P	Ross Detwiler	1	0	0	0	0	0	0	0	–	0
P	Arnie Muñoz	13	0	0	0	0	0	0	0	–	0
P	Jonathan Albaladejo	14	0	0	0	0	0	0	0	–	0
P	Ryan Wagner	14	0	0	0	0	0	0	0	–	0
P	Luis Ayala	44	0	0	0	0	0	0	0	–	0
P	Ray King	55	0	0	0	0	0	0	0	–	0
	Team totals	162	5520	673	1415	309	31	123	646	.256	69

=== Pitching ===
Note: Pos = Position; W = Wins; L = Losses; ERA = Earned run average; G = Games pitched; GS = Games started; SV = Saves; IP = Innings pitched; H = Hits allowed; R = Runs allowed; ER = Earned runs allowed; BB = Walks allowed; K = Strikeouts

Complete pitching statistics are available here.

Pos	Player	W	L	ERA	G	GS	SV	IP	H	R	ER	BB	K
SP	Matt Chico	7	9	4.63	31	31	0	167.0	183	96	86	74	94
SP	Mike Bacsik	5	8	5.11	29	20	0	118.0	141	73	67	29	45
SP	Jason Bergmann	6	6	4.45	21	21	0	115.1	99	59	57	42	86
SP	Shawn Hill	4	5	3.42	16	16	0	97.1	86	42	37	25	65
SP	Tim Redding	3	6	3.64	15	15	0	84.0	84	35	34	38	47
SP	Jason Simontacchi	6	7	6.37	13	13	0	70.2	95	53	50	23	42
CL	Chad Cordero	3	3	3.36	76	0	37	75.0	75	31	28	29	62
RP	Saúl Rivera	4	6	3.68	85	0	3	93.0	88	39	38	42	64
RP	Jon Rauch	8	4	3.61	88	0	4	87.1	75	37	35	21	71
RP	Jesús Colomé	5	1	3.82	61	0	1	66.0	64	30	28	27	43
RP	Ray King	1	1	4.54	55	0	0	33.2	31	17	17	18	18
	Micah Bowie	4	3	4.55	30	8	0	57.1	55	30	29	27	42
	Joel Hanrahan	5	3	6.00	12	11	0	51.0	59	35	34	38	43
	Chris Schroder	2	3	3.18	37	0	0	45.1	36	19	16	15	43
	Luis Ayala	2	2	3.19	44	0	1	42.1	43	16	15	12	28
	Levale Speigner	2	3	8.78	19	6	0	40.0	58	39	39	23	19
	Billy Traber	2	2	4.76	28	2	0	39.2	50	22	21	13	27
	John Lannan	2	2	4.15	6	6	0	34.2	36	17	16	17	10
	John Patterson	1	5	7.47	7	7	0	31.1	39	26	26	22	15
	Winston Abreu	0	1	5.93	26	0	0	30.1	37	21	20	9	26
	Jerome Williams	0	5	7.20	6	6	0	30.0	34	26	24	18	15
	Ryan Wagner	0	2	5.74	14	0	0	15.2	20	11	10	8	9
	Jonathan Albaladejo	1	1	1.88	14	0	0	14.1	7	3	3	2	12
	Arnie Muñoz	0	0	6.75	13	0	0	5.1	6	4	4	7	3
	Chris Booker	0	1	18.00	3	0	0	1.0	1	2	2	1	1
	Ross Detwiler	0	0	0.00	1	0	0	1.0	0	0	0	0	1
	Team totals	73	89	4.58	162	162	46	1446.2	1502	783	736	580	931

=== Team leaders ===
Qualifying players only.

==== Batting ====
Stat	Player	Total
Avg.	Dmitri Young	.320
HR	Ryan Zimmerman	24
RBI	Ryan Zimmerman	110
R	Ryan Zimmerman	91
H	Ryan Zimmerman	174
SB	Felipe López	24

==== Pitching ====
Stat	Player	Total
W	Jon Rauch	8
L	Matt Chico	9
ERA	Matt Chico	4.63
SO	Matt Chico	94
SV	Chad Cordero	37
IP	Matt Chico	167.0

== Awards and honors ==
=== All-Stars ===
- Dmitri Young, 1B

=== Annual awards ===
- National League Comeback Player of the Year: Dmitri Young

== Records and firsts ==
The 2007 Nationals became the first team in modern baseball (1901–present) to trail 4–0 in each of their first six games. as well as the first to not score during the first three innings of each of their first ten games.

The 2007 Nationals also set the National League record for not scoring a run in the first inning of their first 22 games.

On August 7, 2007, in a game against the San Francisco Giants at AT&T Park, Nationals pitcher Mike Bacsik gave up career home run number 756 to Barry Bonds, who broke a 33-year-old record previously held by Hank Aaron.

== Farm system ==
Level	Team	League	Manager
AAA	Columbus Clippers	International League	John Stearns
AA	Harrisburg Senators	Eastern League	Scott Little
A	Potomac Nationals	Carolina League	Randy Knorr
A	Hagerstown Suns	South Atlantic League	Tom Herr
A-Short Season	Vermont Lake Monsters	New York–Penn League	Darnell Coles
Rookie	GCL Nationals	Gulf Coast League	Bob Henley
