= Mike Bacsik =

Mike Bacsik may refer to:

- Mike Bacsik (2000s pitcher), (born 1977), left-handed pitcher
- Mike Bacsik (1970s pitcher), (born 1952), right-handed pitcher
