= Chris Booker (disambiguation) =

Chris Booker (born 1971) is an American radio and TV personality.

Chris Booker may also refer to:

- Christopher Booker (1937–2019), British journalist and author
- Chris Booker (baseball) (born 1976), American baseball pitcher
- Chris Booker (basketball) (born 1981), American basketball player
