= Jon Rauch =

American baseball pitcher (born 1978)

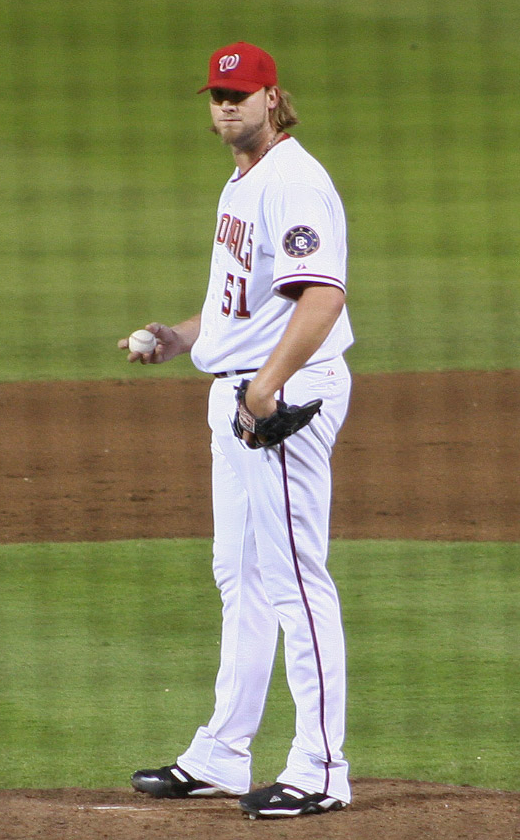
- Rauch with the Washington Nationals in 2006
- Pitcher
- Born: September 27, 1978 (age 48); Louisville, Kentucky, U.S.
- Batted: Right Threw: Right

MLB debut
- April 2, 2002, for the Chicago White Sox

Last MLB appearance
- May 17, 2013, for the Miami Marlins

MLB statistics
- Win–loss record: 43–40
- Earned run average: 3.90
- Strikeouts: 475
- Stats at Baseball Reference

Teams
- Chicago White Sox (2002, 2004); Montreal Expos / Washington Nationals (2004–2008); Arizona Diamondbacks (2008–2009); Minnesota Twins (2009–2010); Toronto Blue Jays (2011); New York Mets (2012); Miami Marlins (2013)
Medals
Men's baseball
Representing United States
Olympic Games
Gold medal – first place	2000 Sydney	Team

Jon Erich Rauch (born September 27, 1978) is an American former professional baseball pitcher. At 6 feet 11 inches (2.11 m), he is tied with Sean Hjelle as the tallest player in Major League Baseball (MLB) history. He is also an Olympic Gold Medalist in baseball.

== Early years ==
Rauch attended and graduated from Oldham County High School. He grew up in Westport, Kentucky. Rauch played college baseball at Morehead State University, where he double majored in physics and business. He was also a member of the social fraternity Sigma Phi Epsilon, Kentucky Zeta chapter.

== Professional career ==
=== Chicago White Sox ===
Rauch, weighing 290 pounds (130 kg), was drafted in the third round of the 1999 amateur draft by the Chicago White Sox. He debuted with the White Sox on April 2, 2002.

In 2002, Rauch's first stint in the big leagues resulted in a 6.59 ERA in eight games and six starts. He did not play in the majors in 2003, then returned to the majors in 2004 after a strong Triple-A campaign. However, against major league batters he again posted a high ERA of 6.23. In July 2004, Rauch was traded to the Montreal Expos along with Triple-A reliever Gary Majewski for Carl Everett.

=== Montreal Expos/Washington Nationals ===
On August 13, 2004, Rauch hit a home run against the Houston Astros off Roger Clemens, making him the tallest man ever to hit a home run in Major League Baseball. Despite a strong finish to the season in Montreal, Rauch was sent to the minors when the Expos moved to Washington. After putting up better numbers in the minors, Rauch finished the 2005 season with the Nationals, used mostly as a reliever, and going 2–4 with a 3.60 ERA.

In 2006, Rauch had his best season, posted a 4–5 record, a 3.35 ERA, and appearing in 85 games, second most in the NL.

In 2007, Rauch led the Major Leagues in appearances with 88. He finished the year with an 8–4 record, four saves, and a 3.61 ERA. His eight victories led the team in wins, a rarity in baseball for a relief pitcher.

On February 2, 2008, Rauch signed a two-year contract with the Nationals, worth a total of $3.2 million. Before being traded, Rauch spent most of the year as the closer in place of injured Chad Cordero.

Rauch was the winning pitcher in the first game in the history of Nationals Park.

=== Arizona Diamondbacks ===
On July 22, 2008, Rauch was traded to the Arizona Diamondbacks for second base prospect Emilio Bonifacio.

=== Minnesota Twins ===
On August 28, 2009, Rauch was traded to the Minnesota Twins for RHP Kevin Mulvey. He appeared in 17 games for the Twins before the end of the season, posting a 5–1 record with a 1.72 ERA.

On April 2, 2010, Twins manager Ron Gardenhire named Rauch the team's closer, replacing the injured Joe Nathan. On April 6, 2010, Rauch earned his first save as a Twin with a perfect ninth with two strikeouts versus the Los Angeles Angels of Anaheim in a 5–3 win. Rauch served as the team's closer through August, when the Twins acquired Matt Capps. During his time as closer, he saved 21 games in 25 opportunities.

After the Twins acquired Capps, Rauch returned to his previous role as a set-up man and long reliever. He became a free agent following the season.

=== Toronto Blue Jays ===
On January 17, 2011, the Blue Jays signed Rauch to a one-year deal worth $3.5M that included a club option for $3.75M in 2012.

Blue Jays manager John Farrell suffered a dislocated jaw while attempting to restrain Rauch from going after umpire Alfonso Marquez during a game on July 2, 2011. Both Rauch and Farrell were ejected from the game.

After pitching in a game against the Seattle Mariners on August 15, 2011, Rauch was taken to a Seattle hospital for an emergency appendectomy. He was placed on the 15-day disabled list on August 16, 2011. At the time of injury, Rauch led the Blue Jays in appearances (with 51), posting a 5–4 record with a 4.47 earned run average and 11 saves.

=== New York Mets ===
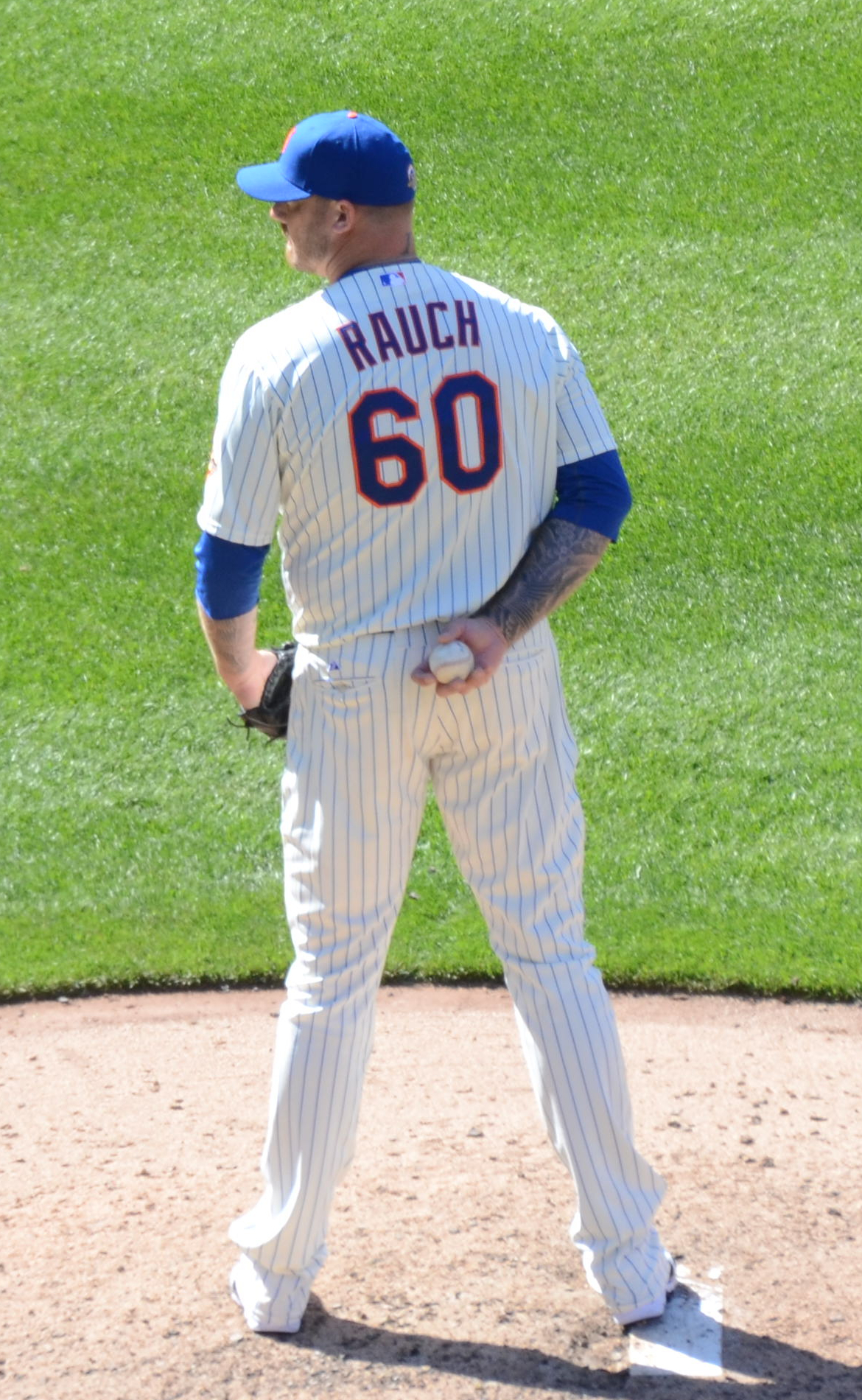
Rauch with the New York Mets

On December 6, 2011, Rauch agreed to a one-year, $3.5 million contract with the New York Mets. On May 1, 2012, Rauch faced Houston Astros second baseman Jose Altuve. The 17-inch (432mm) height difference between Rauch and Altuve (5 feet 6 inches) is believed to be the biggest between pitcher and batter with exception of a 1951 publicity stunt in which a 3-foot-7-inch (1.09m) Eddie Gaedel had one at bat for the St. Louis Browns.

=== Miami Marlins ===
On February 5, 2013, Rauch agreed to a one-year deal with the Miami Marlins. Rauch was designated for assignment on May 18. At the time of his designation, Rauch had a 1–2 record with an earned run average of 7.56. He was released on May 22, 2013.

=== Baltimore Orioles ===
On June 1, 2013, it was announced that the Orioles had signed Rauch to a minor league contract. On July 3, Rauch opted out of his minor league contract. He went 1–0 with a 2.89 ERA in 10 appearances over 9.1 innings, striking out 10.

=== Kansas City Royals ===
On January 23, 2014, Rauch signed a minor league contract with the Kansas City Royals with an invitation to spring training. He was released on March 26.

Rauch retired following the 2014 season.

== Personal life ==
Rauch is 6 feet 11 inches (2.11 m) tall, and when he played, was the tallest major leaguer in history. Sean Hjelle, who is the same height, debuted in 2022.

Rauch is currently a project manager for Sun Valley Masonry in the greater Tucson area.

== See also ==
- List of Major League Baseball single-inning strikeout leaders
