= Chris Schroder =

American baseball player (born 1978)

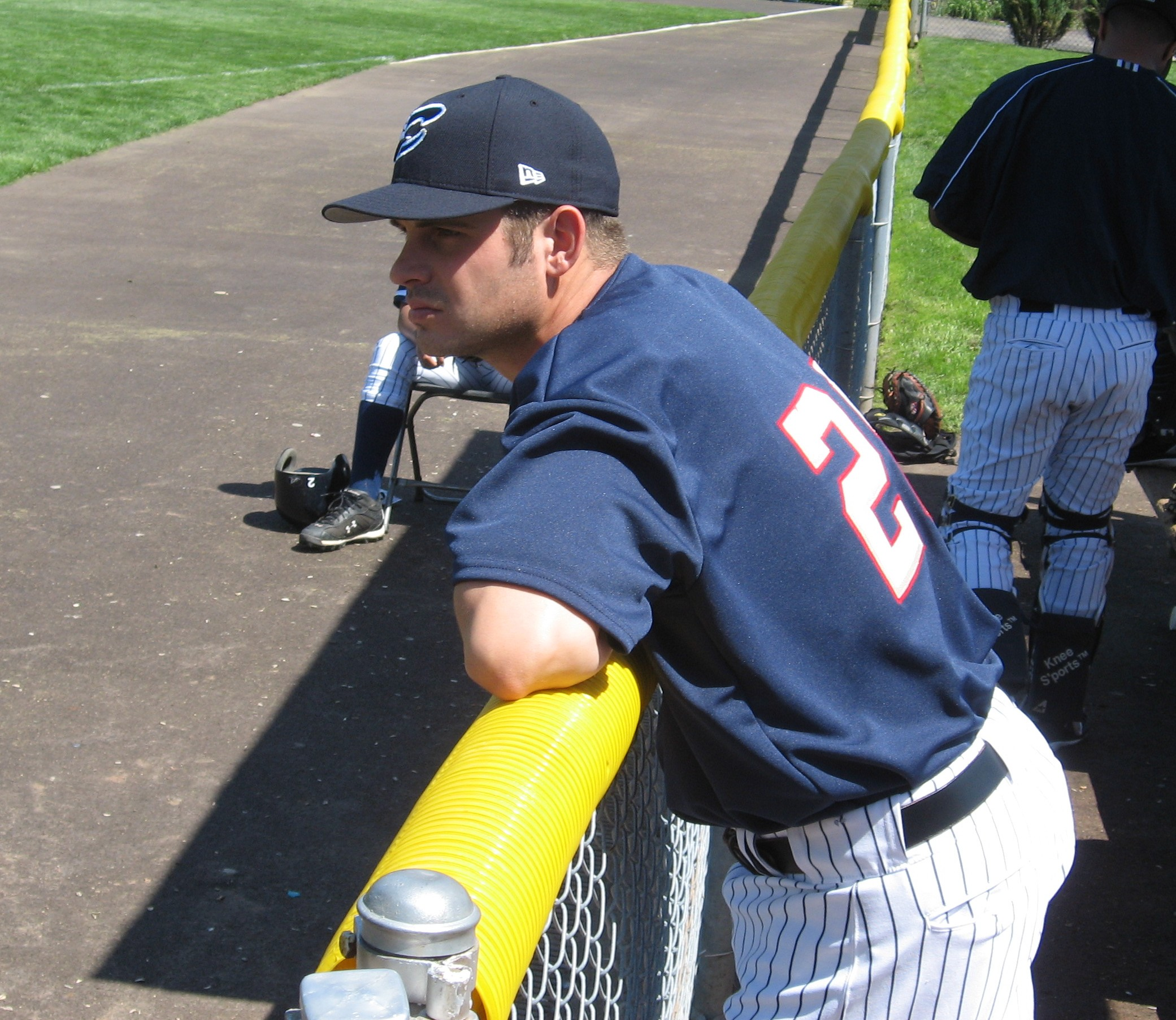
- Relief pitcher
- Born: August 20, 1978 (age 47); Okarche, Oklahoma, U.S.
- Batted: Right Threw: Right

MLB debut
- August 8, 2006, for the Washington Nationals

Last MLB appearance
- May 21, 2008, for the Washington Nationals

MLB statistics
- Win–loss record: 2–5
- Earned run average: 4.46
- Strikeouts: 85
- Stats at Baseball Reference

Teams
- Washington Nationals (2006–2008)

Christopher Keith Schroder (born August 20, 1978) is an American former professional baseball relief pitcher. He attended Oklahoma City University. Bob Carpenter coined him one of the 'er boys' along with Chris Booker and Ryan Wagner.

== Baseball career ==
Schroder was known as a strikeout pitcher. In 2006, he made it to the majors with the Washington Nationals, and appeared in 21 games, pitching 28 1/3 innings and recording 39 strikeouts. But he also walked 15 and allowed 7 homers. All told, by the end of 2006, he had pitched 97 innings in Triple-A Columbus with 121 K's.

He started 2007 at Triple-A Columbus, and improved his home run problem—in 26 games he threw 33 innings, striking out 45. While he still conceded 18 walks, he did not surrender any home runs, posting an ERA of 1.64. On June 20, he was called up to the Nationals.

Schroder was the winning pitcher in the August 7, 2007, game between the Nationals and the San Francisco Giants. It was in this game that Barry Bonds hit his 756th home run off Schroder's teammate, Mike Bacsik, breaking the 33-year-old record held by Hank Aaron for most career home runs. The Nationals won 8-6.

He signed a one-year deal with the Athletics in November 2008. He did not make the 2009 Opening Day roster and was designated for assignment on April 8, 2009, to make room for newly claimed pitcher Dan Giese. In October 2009 Schroder was granted free agency. On January 11, 2010 Schroder signed a minor league contract with the Florida Marlins.
