= Matt Chico =

American baseball player (born 1983)

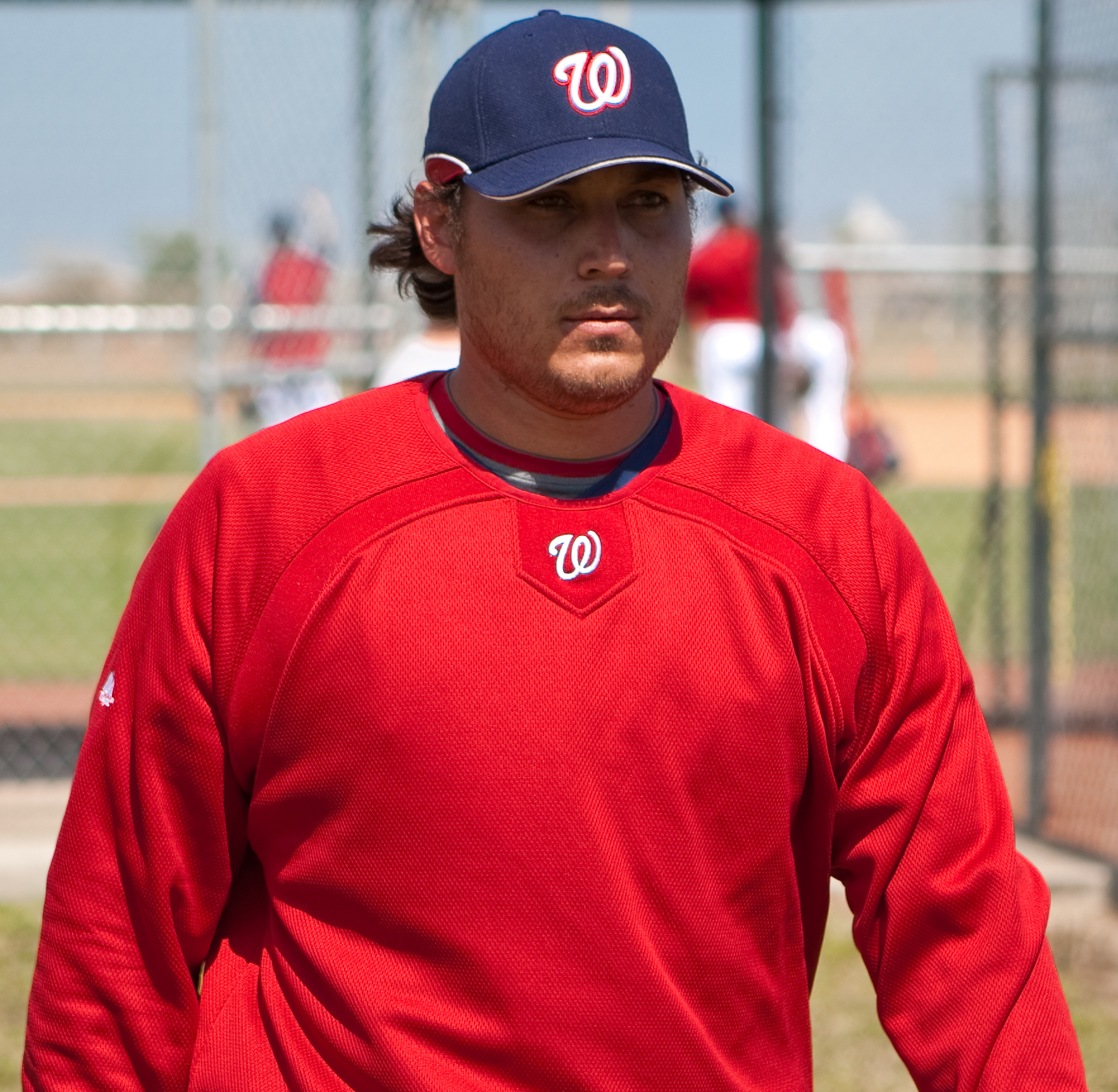
- Chico with the Washington Nationals in 2009 during spring training
- Pitcher
- Born: June 10, 1983 (age 42); Fullerton, California, U.S.
- Batted: Left Threw: Left

MLB debut
- April 4, 2007, for the Washington Nationals

Last MLB appearance
- May 8, 2010, for the Washington Nationals

MLB statistics
- Win–loss record: 7–15
- Earned run average: 4.95
- Strikeouts: 128
- Stats at Baseball Reference

Teams
- Washington Nationals (2007–2008, 2010)
Medals
Men's baseball
Representing United States
World Junior Baseball Championship
Silver medal – second place	2000 Edmonton	Team

Matthew Bryan Chico (born June 10, 1983) is a former American professional baseball pitcher of Mexican-American descent. He played in Major League Baseball (MLB) for the Washington Nationals.

During the offseason, he resides in Arizona with his four children.

== High school career ==
Chico is a graduate of Fallbrook Union High School.

== College career ==
Chico attended the University of Southern California in 2001-2002 and then transferred to Palomar College for the 2002–2003 academic year.

== Professional career ==
=== Arizona Diamondbacks ===
Chico was selected by the Arizona Diamondbacks in the third round of the 2003 amateur draft.

Chico began the 2006 season pitching for Lancaster of the High-A California League, where he accrued a 3–4 record and a 3.75 ERA in 10 starts. He was then promoted to the Tennessee of the Double-A Southern League, accumulating a win–loss record of 7–2 and an ERA of 2.22 in 13 starts.

=== Washington Nationals ===
On August 7, 2006, the Washington Nationals acquired Chico and fellow minor league pitcher Garrett Mock from Arizona in a trade for veteran right-handed pitcher Liván Hernández. After joining the Nationals organization, Chico pitched for the Harrisburg Senators of the Double-A Eastern League, winning 2 and losing none of his first 4 starts and compiling a 3.27 ERA.

At the end of 2006, Chico had earned a spot on the Nationals' 40-man protected roster. Coming out of 2007 spring training, Chico had made the club's starting rotation, and he made his major league debut on April 4, 2007, at RFK Stadium versus the Florida Marlins.

His first major league win came on April 16, in a Nats 5–1 victory over the Atlanta Braves. Chico got off to a rocky start, on a cold and bitterly windy night, walking the bases loaded in the first inning, but escaping unscathed. He went on to pitch five innings, before walking two in the sixth and getting relieved, allowing just one run.

During his next start, at Florida on April 21, 2007, in the bottom of the first inning, Chico attempted to throw a changeup to Josh Willingham. He missed the plate badly; the ball sailed over the first-base dugout.

Chico ended up becoming a mainstay for the Nationals in the first half of the season. By Mid-May, four of the Nats' five starting pitchers were out with injuries, but by July 4, Chico had not missed a turn, and was second in the league with 18 starts. From June 23 to July 4, he pitched 20 innings allowing only one run. He ended the 2007 season with a 7–9 record and an ERA of 4.63 over 167 innings.

Chico emerged as the Nationals' #2 starter at the beginning of the season. However, he struggled to an 0–6 record in eight starts and three relief appearances, and was optioned to the Triple-A Columbus Clippers on May 23. After he pitched only one game for Columbus, an MRI examination in early June revealed loose bodies in his throwing elbow.

On July 3, 2008, Chico underwent elbow reconstruction surgery. He missed the rest of the 2008 season and most of the 2009 season.

He returned to the major leagues on May 8, 2010, when he tossed five-plus innings and allowed two earned runs to the Florida Marlins at Nationals Park while giving up six hits, striking out three and walking none but did not get a decision. A day after pitching, Chico was designated for assignment on May 9 but remained on the 40-man roster and was sent down to the Double-A Harrisburg Senators. He was designated for assignment again on December 21, he cleared waivers and was sent outright to Triple-A Syracuse Chiefs the next day. He was released on July 21, 2011.

=== Los Angeles Dodgers ===
On December 13, 2011, Chico signed a minor league contract with the Los Angeles Dodgers organization. He was released prior to the start of the season on March 30, 2012.

=== New Jersey Jackals ===
On April 18, 2012, the New Jersey Jackals of the Can-Am League announced that they had signed Chico. After going 0–4 with a 9.39 ERA he was released.

=== York Revolution ===
On June 18, 2012, the York Revolution of the Atlantic League announced they had signed Chico. After making six starts for the Revolution, Chico was released going 1–3 with a 7.50 ERA.
