= Micah Bowie =

American baseball player (born 1974)

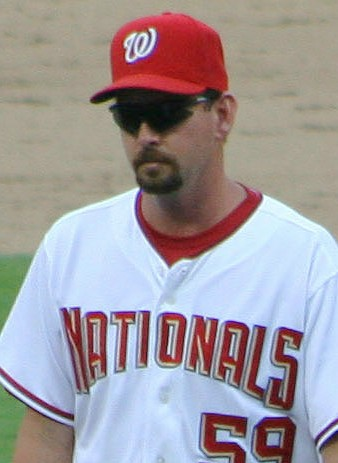
- Pitcher
- Born: November 10, 1974 (age 50); Webster, Texas, U.S.
- Batted: Left Threw: Left

MLB debut
- July 24, 1999, for the Atlanta Braves

Last MLB appearance
- April 21, 2008, for the Colorado Rockies

MLB statistics
- Win–loss record: 8–13
- Earned run average: 6.16
- Strikeouts: 111
- Stats at Baseball Reference

Teams
- Atlanta Braves (1999); Chicago Cubs (1999); Oakland Athletics (2002–2003); Washington Nationals (2006–2007); Colorado Rockies (2008)

Micah Andrew Bowie (born November 10, 1974) is an American former professional baseball left-handed pitcher. He played in Major League Baseball (MLB) for the Atlanta Braves, Chicago Cubs, Oakland Athletics, Washington Nationals, and Colorado Rockies.

== Professional career ==
=== Atlanta Braves ===
He was drafted by the Atlanta Braves in the 8th round in 1993. His MLB debut was July 24, 1999, and, although a starter for most of his career up until this point, made three relief appearances, and then was traded to the Chicago Cubs, along with Ruben Quevedo and a minor league player to be named later (Joey Nation), for Terry Mulholland and José Hernández.

=== Chicago Cubs ===
He made 11 starts for the Cubs, compiling an ERA of 9.96.

=== Oakland Athletics ===
After spending the following year in the minors as a starter, he signed with the Oakland Athletics and was converted to a relief pitcher. Bowie was a part of the A's 20 consecutive game winning streak in 2002.

=== Arizona Diamondbacks ===
After the 2003 season, he was signed by the Arizona Diamondbacks to a minor league contract, but underwent Tommy John surgery and missed the entire 2004 season. In December 2004, he was signed by the Washington Nationals to a minor league contract.

=== Washington Nationals ===
Bowie pitched well in relief for the Nationals' Triple-A affiliate New Orleans Zephyrs, and in July was called up to the majors. He was effective as a set-up man in 15 relief appearances, posting an ERA of 1.37 before going on the disabled list and eventually missing the rest of the season.

In 2007, he was re-signed by the Nationals and started the season as a regular set-up reliever. By mid-May he had appeared in 20 games with an ERA of 3.71, but then was pressed into service as a starter, after four of five Nationals starters went on the disabled list. On May 20, Bowie made his first Major League start since 1999, pitching 3 1/3 innings allowing two runs in a no decision. By June 17, Bowie had proved himself to be the Nationals' most consistent starter, going 4–0 with a 3.82 ERA in six starts. However, he was placed on the disabled list on July 2 with a hip injury.

Bowie was outrighted to the minor leagues on October 17, 2007. He refused the assignment and became a free agent.

=== Colorado Rockies ===
On December 21, 2007, the Colorado Rockies signed Bowie to a minor league contract with an invitation to spring training. He made the team's opening day roster as a member of the bullpen. Bowie was outrighted to the minor leagues by the Rockies on June 26, but refused his assignment and became a free agent.

=== Houston Astros ===
On July 3, 2008, Bowie signed a minor league contract with the Houston Astros. He was released by the Astros in mid-August.

== Post-retirement ==
Since retiring in 2008, Bowie has operated a baseball academy.

== Personal life ==
Bowie married Keeley Kolacek in 1995, between games of a Durham Bulls doubleheader; they have two children.

Bowie developed back problems during his playing career and rather than undergo disk fusion surgery that might need to be repeated, elected in August 2016 to have a spinal-cord stimulator implanted to suppress pain. The device failed after about one month; the battery migrated, damaging his liver, diaphragm and one lung. After continuing breathing problems, the Mayo Clinic found his lungs had electrical burns; in May 2019 the device was removed at Barnes-Jewish Hospital in St. Louis, Missouri, by the same doctor who had repaired his groin injury in 2007. He has 8% of his former lung capacity. Bowie was 20 days short of the four years on the roster required for the Major League Baseball Players Association to automatically grant a disability claim, but the Baseball Assistance Team and the Oakland A's Community Fund assisted him and his family with the resulting medical bills.
