= Mike Bacsik (2000s pitcher) =

American baseball player (born 1977)

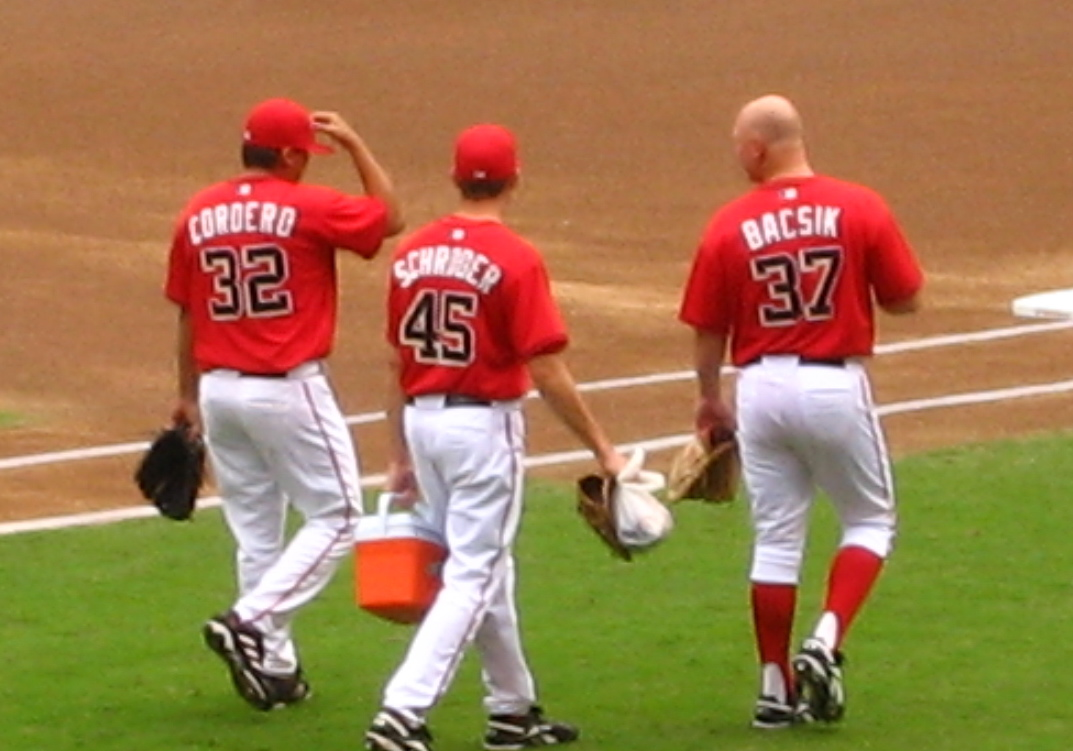
- Chad Cordero, Chris Schroder and Bacsik (from left) with the Washington Nationals in 2008
- Pitcher
- Born: November 11, 1977 (age 48); Dallas, Texas, U.S.
- Batted: Left Threw: Left

MLB debut
- August 5, 2001, for the Cleveland Indians

Last MLB appearance
- September 30, 2007, for the Washington Nationals

MLB statistics
- Win–loss record: 10–13
- Earned run average: 5.46
- Strikeouts: 97
- Stats at Baseball Reference

Teams
- Cleveland Indians (2001); New York Mets (2002–2003); Texas Rangers (2004); Washington Nationals (2007)

Michael Joseph Bacsik (/ˈbæsɪk/; born November 11, 1977) is an American former Major League Baseball (MLB) pitcher, current radio host, and television analyst. He is known for giving up Barry Bonds' 756th career home run on August 7, 2007, which broke the all-time record formerly held by Hank Aaron.

After his baseball career, Bacsik was a radio producer for KTCK, but was later fired. A year later, he was hired as a radio host at KRLD-FM.

In 2024, Bacsik became an analyst for Texas Rangers games on Bally Sports Southwest, later joining the Rangers Sports Network when that channel launched in 2025.

== Early life ==
Michael Joseph Bacsik was born on November 11, 1977, in Dallas Texas.

== Professional career ==
=== Draft and minor leagues ===
Bacsik was drafted by the Cleveland Indians in the 18th round (543rd overall) in the 1996 Major League Baseball draft out of Duncanville High School.

=== Cleveland Indians (2001) ===
Bacsik was in his sixth minor league season with the Indians organization before making his debut on August 5, 2001. He was supposed to be serving mop-up duty, as the Seattle Mariners had opened up a huge lead on the Indians. He was knocked around at first and settled in. The Indians rallied from 12 runs down to win the game in extra innings. Bacsik had a 9.00 ERA in three relief appearances (9 innings) in 2001.

=== New York Mets (2002–2003) ===
On December 11, 2001, as part of a big trade, Bacsik was traded along with Roberto Alomar and Danny Peoples to the New York Mets for Matt Lawton, Alex Escobar, Jerrod Riggan, Earl Snyder, and Billy Traber. On July 5, 2002, he got his first big league win when he made his debut with the Mets. He would later go on to have a 3–2 record with a 4.37 ERA in the 2003 season. He spent just two seasons with the Mets before becoming a free agent on October 15, 2003.

=== Texas Rangers (2004) ===
Two months later, on December 23, 2003, Bacsik signed a contract with the Texas Rangers (incidentally, the team where his father was a member when he was born). He spent most of the 2004 season with the Oklahoma Redhawks, the Rangers' Triple-A affiliate. He made just three starts in 2004 for the big league club, going 1–1 with a 4.60 ERA.

=== Philadelphia Phillies ===
He became a free agent after the 2004 season and signed a contract on November 18, 2004, with the Philadelphia Phillies. However, he spent the whole 2005 season with the Scranton/Wilkes-Barre Red Barons, the Phillies' Triple-A team. He opted for minor league free agency after the 2005 season.

=== Washington Nationals (2007) ===
He signed a contract with the Washington Nationals on February 9, 2006, with an invitation to spring training. He made just one start in spring training and gave up six runs in 0.2 innings before getting cut in April. Afterwards, he signed a minor league contract with the Arizona Diamondbacks. He had an impressive minor league season with the Diamondbacks' Triple-A team, the Tucson Sidewinders, in which he went a perfect 11–0 with a 2.79 ERA in 28 games (10 starts).

==== 2007 ====
Bacsik became a free agent after the 2006 season and later signed another minor league contract with the Washington Nationals on November 6, 2006. He did not make the major league team when the Nationals broke camp and started with the Columbus Clippers, the Nationals' Triple-A team. After the Nationals found themselves with four of their five starting pitchers on the disabled list, Bacsik and other pitchers were brought up from their farm system. Despite a record of 1-3 and a 4.00 ERA with Columbus (and an ERA of 5.26 as a starter), Bacsik made his debut with the Nationals on May 19, throwing six shutout innings in a game the Nats eventually lost. In his following start, he pitched 7.2 innings, his longest outing of the year including the minors, allowing three runs and earning his first win in the majors since August 4, 2004. He did not miss a start in the rotation after his last callup until he was sent to the bullpen and went 5–8 with a 5.11 ERA in 20 starts and nine relief appearances.

On August 7, 2007, Bacsik sealed his name in baseball history when he gave up home run number 756 to Barry Bonds, who broke the 33-year-old record for total career home runs previously held by Hank Aaron. During the post-home run celebration, Bacsik tipped his cap to Bonds in a gesture of respect. He visited the Giants clubhouse to personally congratulate Bonds on his achievement, and Bonds gave Bacsik an autographed bat that read: "To Mike, God Bless. Barry Bonds." Coincidentally, Bacsik's father had faced Aaron (as a pitcher for the Texas Rangers) after Aaron had hit his 755th home run. On August 23, 1976, Michael James Bacsik held Aaron to a single and a fly out to right field. The younger Bacsik commented later, "If my dad had been gracious enough to let Hank Aaron hit a home run, we both would have given up 756."

=== Later years ===
On October 26, 2007, the Washington Nationals signed Bacsik to a non-guaranteed minor league contract with an invitation to spring training. After spring training, on March 5, 2008, the Nationals reassigned Bacsik to minor league camp, and he was assigned to Triple-A Columbus. He became a free agent at the end of the season.

In 2011, Bacsik pitched for the Fort Worth Cats, an independent club, in the American Association of Independent Professional Baseball. In 10 starts 49.1 innings he went 2-4 with a 4.01 ERA and 31 strikeouts.

== Media career ==
Following his playing career, Bacsik has had a long-running media career in sports. A former intern at Dallas/Fort Worth (DFW) radio station KTCK ("Sportsradio 1310 The Ticket") for the BaD Radio Show prior to beginning his MLB career, Bacsik later served as the show producer on "The Ticket" for midday host Norm Hitzges and performed other fill-in on-air host duties. He gave the BaD Radio Show many interviews both before and after giving up Bonds' record breaking home run, at one point claiming he would "give up the home run to Bonds" to be immortalized in baseball history. Bacsik was fired by KTCK in late April 2010 for offensive comments he made on Twitter about African Americans and Mexicans in San Antonio.

During the 2007 MLB postseason, Bacsik worked as an analyst for ESPN. Bacsik currently serves as a color analyst for select college baseball games on Fox Sports Southwest and Fox College Sports. During the 2012 college baseball season, he served as the baseball analyst for broadcasts of TCU baseball on The Mountain, the official Mountain West Conference cable TV channel. He also carried that role into the 2013 season, serving as a color analyst for TCU games on Fox Sports Southwest and Fox College Sports.

He currently serves as co-host on the K&C Masterpiece show on DFW radio station KRLD (105.3 The Fan).

After spending time as a studio analyst for Texas Rangers games on Bally Sports Southwest, Bacsik replaced C.J. Nitkowski as the lead analyst for the 2024 season. When the Rangers retook their broadcast rights from Bally Sports and created the Rangers Sports Network in 2025, Bacsik joined the channel as their lead analyst.

== Personal life ==
Bacsik is the son of Michael James Bacsik, who pitched in the majors from 1975–1980. He is married with three children.

Bacsik is also well known around Dallas as a spin class instructor with occasionally unorthodox teaching methods.

=== Twitter controversy ===
Bacsik made offensive comments on his Twitter account following the loss of the Dallas Mavericks to the San Antonio Spurs in game 4 of the first round of the 2010 NBA Playoffs. The comment "Congratulations to all the dirty Mexicans in San Antonio," quickly circulated on social networks online before Bacsik deleted the comments. As Bacsik had already gotten in trouble for posting the ethnic slur "nigger" on his Twitter account two years prior, next Monday, on April 26, 2010, Bacsik was suspended indefinitely from his KTCK duties by owner Cumulus Media for "comments [that] were unacceptable and offensive, and are inconsistent with the core values of KTCK and Cumulus." The next day, Bacsik was fired by The Ticket.

=== Assault charge ===
In 2016, while coaching a youth baseball team, Bacsik pushed the opposing team's third-base coach to the ground, swung at him without making contact, and then pushed him to the ground a second time. Bacsik was charged with assault by contact, a class C misdemeanor punishable by a fine of up to $500. His trial was scheduled for June 2017.

== See also ==
- List of second-generation Major League Baseball players
