= Winston Abreu =

Dominican baseball pitcher (born 1977)

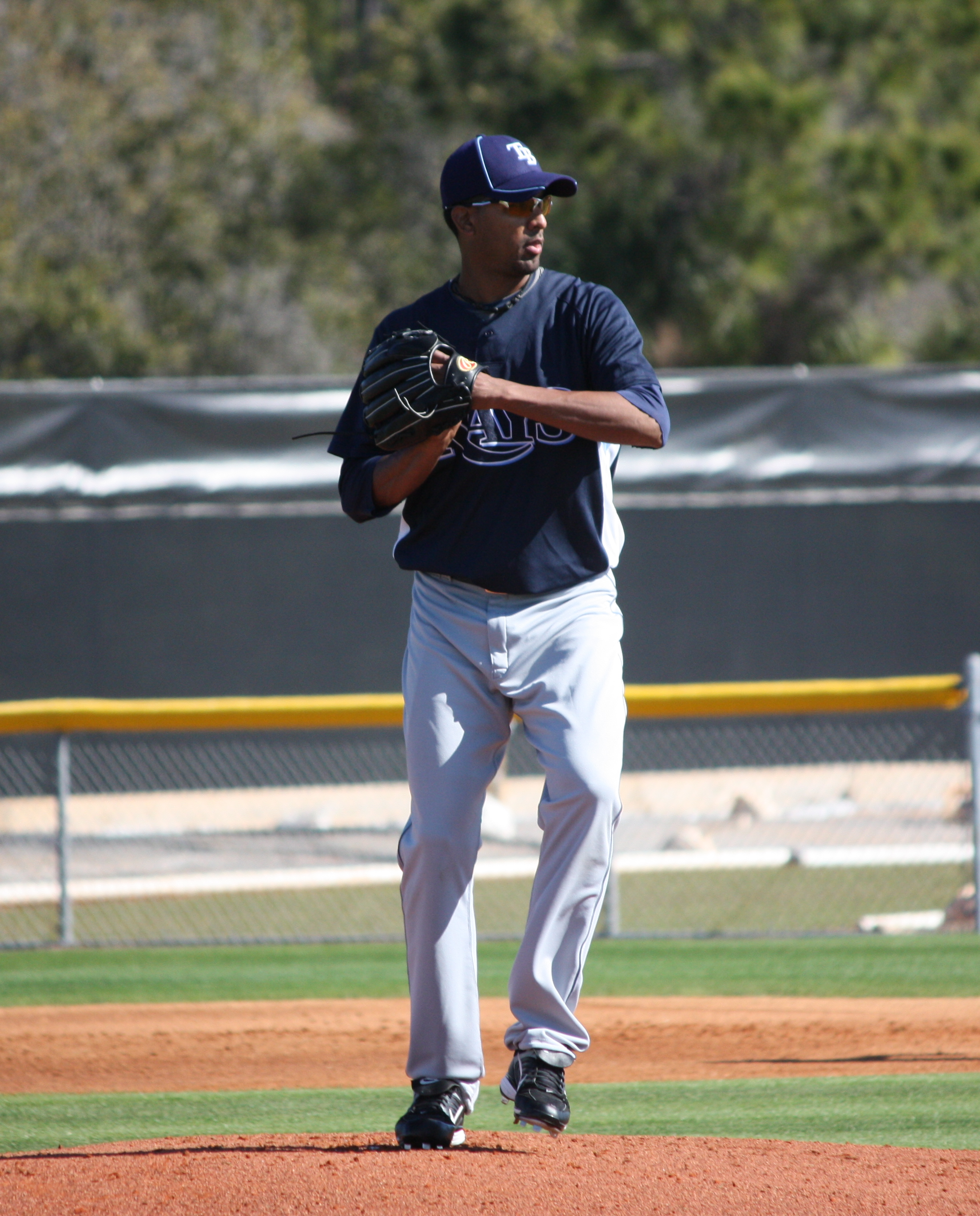
- Abreu with the Tampa Bay Rays
- Pitcher
- Born: April 5, 1977 (age 49); Cotuí, Dominican Republic
- Batted: Right Threw: Right

Professional debut
- MLB: August 6, 2006, for the Baltimore Orioles
- NPB: March 24, 2008, for the Chiba Lotte Marines

Last appearance
- MLB: July 25, 2009, for the Cleveland Indians
- NPB: May 26, 2008, for the Chiba Lotte Marines

MLB statistics
- Win–loss record: 0–1
- Earned run average: 7.31
- Strikeouts: 38
- Stats at Baseball Reference

Teams
- Baltimore Orioles (2006); Washington Nationals (2007); Chiba Lotte Marines (2008); Tampa Bay Rays (2009); Cleveland Indians (2009)

Winston Leonardo Abreu Soler (born April 5, 1977) is a Dominican former professional baseball pitcher. At age 16, he was signed by the Atlanta Braves as a minor league free agent on July 2, 1993. He bats and throws right-handed. He played in Major League Baseball (MLB) for the Baltimore Orioles, Washington Nationals, Tampa Bay Rays and Cleveland Indians and in Nippon Professional Baseball (NPB) for the Chiba Lotte Marines.

== Playing career ==
=== Minor league career ===
Abreu progressed slowly, and (except for four games) did not advance out of Single–A until 2001, compiling an ERA of 4.64 in a full season for the Double–A Greenville Braves. After that season, he was traded to the San Diego Padres for Rudy Seánez, and then the following spring to the Chicago Cubs for Syketo Anderson, and after 11 appearances, released six weeks later. He was picked up by the Kansas City Royals, and finished the 2002 season with the Double–A Wichita Wranglers, posting a solid 3.32 ERA. At the end of the season, he was signed by the New York Yankees. He did not play in 2003 due to injury, and was released in January 2004. He was signed by the Los Angeles Dodgers, had a few unimpressive outings, then released, and was then signed by the Arizona Diamondbacks, where he posted an ERA of 5.68 in Triple-A. In 2004, he was released again, had a short stint with the Guerreros de Oaxaca of the Mexican League, and was signed by the Baltimore Orioles in December 2005.

=== Baltimore Orioles ===
In 2006, with the Orioles' Triple-A affiliate, the Ottawa Lynx, Abreu had his first good Triple-A season, appearing in 46 games with an ERA of 2.48, and, at age 29 finally was called up to the big leagues. In his seven appearances, he pitched 8 innings, but allowed 10 hits, 6 walks, and 9 runs, for an ERA of 10.13.

=== Washington Nationals ===
In 2007, the Washington Nationals signed Abreu to a minor league contract, and he started the spring at Triple-A Columbus in an outstanding fashion, pitching 18 innings and allowing only one run. On May 8, he was called up, and in his first 11 appearances, had allowed runs in only two games, amassing an ERA of 2.31. But then over his next 8 appearances, he allowed runs in seven games, and his ERA ballooned to 6.38; on June 20, he was designated for assignment. Abreu was called back up in September when rosters expanded. Abreu finished the 2007 season with an 0–1 record with a 5.93 ERA in 26 games. He became a free agent after the season.

=== Chiba Lotte Marines ===
Before the start of the 2008 season, Abreu signed with the Chiba Lotte Marines of Nippon Professional Baseball.

=== Tampa Bay Rays ===
On February 6, 2009, Abreu signed a minor league contract with an invitation to spring training with the Tampa Bay Rays. On June 14, Abreu's contract was purchased from the Triple-A Durham Bulls to replace the injured Jason Isringhausen. On June 27, Abreu was designated for assignment by the Rays.

=== Cleveland Indians ===
On July 2, 2009, Abreu was claimed off waivers by the Cleveland Indians. During his tenure with the Indians, Abreu was given a three-game suspension after hitting Jack Hannahan with a pitch on July 25. The Indians designated him for assignment on August 1. On August 5, he cleared waivers and was sent outright to the Triple–A Columbus Clippers.

=== Tampa Bay Rays (second stint) ===
On August 6, 2009, Abreu signed a minor league contract to return to the Tampa Bay Rays organization and was assigned to the Triple–A Durham Bulls.

=== Toronto Blue Jays ===
On December 1, 2010, Abreu signed a minor league contract with the Toronto Blue Jays. He pitched for the Triple-A Las Vegas 51s, where in 53 games, he went 8–5 with a 3.66 ERA, striking out 72 over 66 1/3 innings.

=== Mexican League ===
In 2012, Abreu played with the Diablos Rojos del México of the Mexican League, where in 45 games, he went 4–1 with a 3.83 ERA with 15 saves, striking out 38 over 44 2/3 innings. He began 2013 with the Delfines del Carmen, before signing with the Rojos del Águila de Veracruz. In 11 appearances in the league that year, he went 2–0 with a 1.80 ERA with 3 saves, striking out 7 over 10 innings.

=== Bridgeport Bluefish ===
On May 7, 2013, Abreu signed with the Bridgeport Bluefish of the Atlantic League of Professional Baseball. Abreu re-signed with the Bluefish for the 2014 season.

=== Joplin Blasters ===
Abreu signed with the Joplin Blasters for the 2015 season in their inaugural season. The Blasters play in the American Association of Independent Professional Baseball.

=== Diablos Rojos del México ===
On June 24, 2016, Abreu signed with the Diablos Rojos del México of the Mexican League. He was released on September 23.

=== Cleburne Railroaders ===
On April 20, 2017, Abreu signed with the Cleburne Railroaders of the American Association of Independent Professional Baseball. He was released on October 30.

=== Kansas City Royals ===
On January 15, 2019, Abreu signed a minor league contract with the Kansas City Royals organization. He did not appear for the organization and elected free agency following the season on November 4.

Abreu re-signed with the Royals for the 2020 season. Abreu did not play in a game in 2020 due to the cancellation of the minor league season because of the COVID-19 pandemic. He became a free agent on November 2, 2020.

== Coaching career ==
In 2021, Abreu was named the pitching coach for the Billings Mustangs in the Independent Pioneer League.
