= Mike Bacsik (1970s pitcher) =

American baseball player (born 1952)

- Pitcher
- Born: April 1, 1952 (age 74); Dallas, Texas, U.S.
- Batted: Right Threw: Right

MLB debut
- June 15, 1975, for the Texas Rangers

Last MLB appearance
- August 9, 1980, for the Minnesota Twins

MLB statistics
- Win–loss record: 8–6
- Earned run average: 4.43
- Strikeouts: 77
- Stats at Baseball Reference

Teams
- Texas Rangers (1975–1977); Minnesota Twins (1979–1980)

Michael James Bacsik (/ˈbæsɪk/; born April 1, 1952), is an American former professional baseball pitcher. He played in Major League Baseball (MLB) for the Texas Rangers and Minnesota Twins.

== Early life ==
Michael James Bacsik was born on April 1, 1952, in Dallas, Texas. He attended Bishop Dunne Catholic School in Dallas, Texas, where he excelled in baseball.

== Professional career ==
=== Draft and minor leagues ===
Mike was selected by the Baltimore Orioles in the 55th round (922nd overall) of the 1970 MLB June Amateur Draft.

=== Texas Rangers (1975–1977) ===
On June 15, 1975, Bacsik made his MLB debut for the Texas Rangers. In 1976, Bacsik was one of 30 pitchers who pitched to Hank Aaron while Aaron had accumulated 755 career home runs. Aaron went one for two against him with a single.

=== Minnesota Twins (1979–1980) ===
From 1979 to 1980, Bacsik pitched for the Minnesota Twins.

== Personal life ==
His son, Mike Bacsik, pitched to Barry Bonds when Bonds was on 755 home runs. Bonds went three for three against his son with a double, a single and the record-breaking home run. The younger Bacsik would comment, in 2007, "If my dad had been gracious enough to let Hank Aaron hit a home run, we both would have given up 756."
