= Nook Logan =

American baseball player (born 1979)

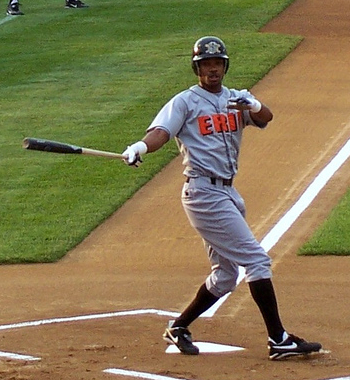
- Logan with the Erie SeaWolves in 2006
- Center fielder
- Born: November 28, 1979 (age 46); Natchez, Mississippi, U.S.
- Batted: Switch Threw: Right

MLB debut
- July 21, 2004, for the Detroit Tigers

Last MLB appearance
- September 30, 2007, for the Washington Nationals

MLB statistics
- Batting average: .268
- Home runs: 2
- Runs batted in: 56
- Stats at Baseball Reference

Teams
- Detroit Tigers (2004–2005); Washington Nationals (2006–2007)

Exavier Prente "Nook" Logan (born November 28, 1979) is an American former Major League Baseball center fielder. He attended Copiah-Lincoln Community College. He made his Major League debut July 21, 2004, with the Detroit Tigers against the Kansas City Royals. He was named the Tigers' rookie of the year for 2004.

Although he was expected to compete for the center field job in 2006, Logan was beaten out by Curtis Granderson and was subsequently injured upon arrival in the minors. On August 29, 2006, Logan was designated for assignment by the Tigers. On September 1 of that year, he was traded to the Washington Nationals, after asking Detroit management for a trade. Upon arriving in Washington, Logan immediately impressed with his spectacular catches and speed. Logan was recognized that year as the fastest player in Major League Baseball. He ended up hitting .300 and making several impressive catches in the field.

In 2007, Logan was the opening day center fielder for the Nationals. He injured his foot that day after crashing into the wall in the outfield. He would be out for over a month but ended up hitting .265 after slumping toward the tail end of the season. In June, his baserunning blunder that ended a game against Cleveland inspired perhaps the most memorable radio call in the career of broadcaster Charlie Slowes. Logan's lack of power prompted the Nationals to look for a power-hitting outfielder to replace him at season's end. Logan was not offered a new contract by the Nationals and became a free agent on December 12, 2007.

On December 13, 2007, Logan was identified in the Mitchell Report as a client of Kirk Radomski, who distributed banned performance-enhancing substances to MLB players. He would later admit that he used Human Growth Hormone (HGH), a legal substance, banned by Major League Baseball, in order to recover from his injury in the minor leagues.

On February 15, 2008, Logan signed a minor league contract with the Los Angeles Dodgers. Without a chance of making the team's opening day roster Logan became a free agent. On June 23, he signed with the Long Island Ducks of the independent Atlantic League and played out the season.

In 2010 Logan played for the Newark Bears.

He has since spoken of the Mitchell Report as having had a "huge impact" on his ability to sign on with another Major League Baseball club.

== See also ==
- List of Major League Baseball players named in the Mitchell Report
