= Rick Aponte =

American baseball player and coach

Rick Aponte (born April 3, 1956, in El Seibo, Dominican Republic) is a former Major League Baseball bullpen coach for the Washington Nationals, who served from 2007 to 2008. He is currently the pitching coach for the Tri-City ValleyCats.
