= Levale Speigner =

American baseball player (born 1980)

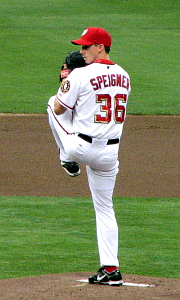
- Speigner pitching for the Nationals on June 2, 2007.
- Relief pitcher
- Born: September 24, 1980 (age 45); Thomasville, Georgia, U.S.
- Batted: Right Threw: Right

MLB debut
- April 2, 2007, for the Washington Nationals

Last MLB appearance
- September 24, 2008, for the Washington Nationals

MLB statistics
- Win–loss record: 2–4
- Earned run average: 9.19
- Strikeouts: 20
- Stats at Baseball Reference

Teams
- Washington Nationals (2007–2008)

Jimmy Levale Speigner (born September 24, 1980) is an American former professional baseball relief pitcher. He played in Major League Baseball (MLB) for the Washington Nationals from 2007 to 2008. Speigner attended college, and played NCAA ball for four years, at Auburn University.

== Professional career ==
A 14th-round pick by the Minnesota Twins in 2003, Speigner worked his way up the minor league chain, having a solid year in 2006 for the Double-A New Britain Rock Cats, and spent a short time with the Triple-A Rochester Red Wings. After the season, he was selected by the Washington Nationals as a Rule 5 draft pick.

Speigner worked as a middle reliever and appeared in 12 games in 2007, with a respectable 3.77 ERA through mid-May. But by then, four of the National's five starters were on the disabled list, and, Speigner, along with a few other Nats relievers, was pressed into service as a starter. From May 16 through June 2, Speigner started four times, each time a disaster. His longest outing was 4 innings, and over the four-game span compiled a record of 0-2 and an ERA of 14.44. In his June 2 start, however, while he gave up 6 runs on 6 hits in the first inning, he then retired 10 of the final 11 batters he faced. This gave Manager Manny Acta enough confidence to try Speigner one more time. On June 9, facing two-time Cy Young Award winner Johan Santana, Speigner threw a gem, six innings, two hits, and one run, earning a 3-1 victory over the Minnesota Twins. Speigner gave credit to pitching coach Randy St. Claire for correcting a number of errors. But he followed that with a game against the Toronto Blue Jays in which he surrendered seven runs in 3 1/3 innings. Three days later, he appeared in relief and surrendered 2 runs in 2 innings, and the following day he was designated for assignment. The Nationals and the Twins worked out a deal allowing the Nationals to send Speigner to Triple-A Columbus. The Nationals gave up minor league outfielder Darnell McDonald.

== Personal life ==
Speigner currently lives just outside of his college alma mater, (Auburn), in Opelika, Alabama, with his wife, Perri Wilson Speigner, along with their two children, Campbell and Grant, where he coaches baseball. Both in little leagues with his son, as well as at the high school level.
