= Jason Bergmann =

American baseball player (born 1981)

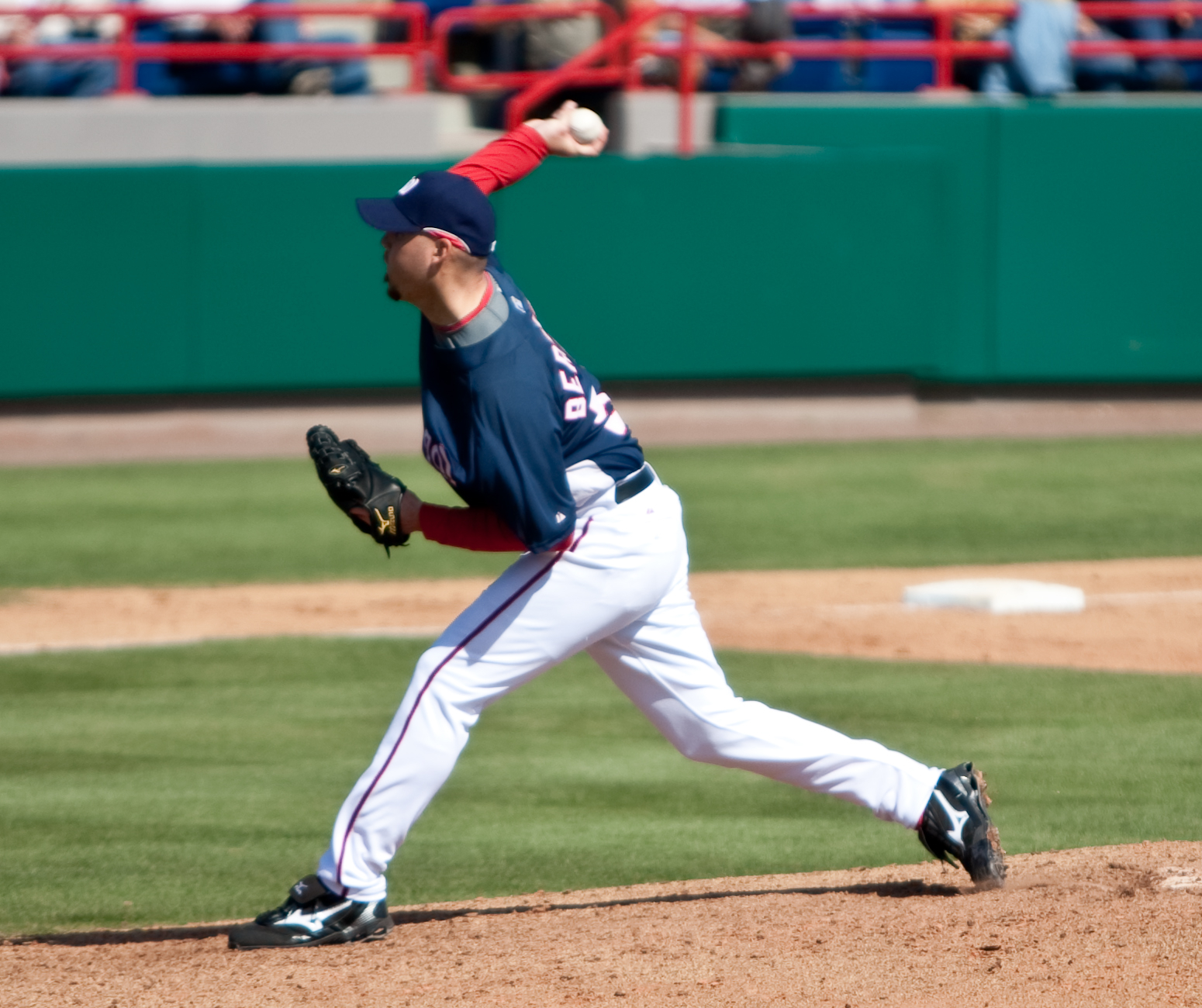
- Bergmann with the Washington Nationals
- Pitcher
- Born: September 25, 1981 (age 44); Neptune City, New Jersey, U.S.
- Batted: Right Threw: Right

MLB debut
- August 28, 2005, for the Washington Nationals

Last MLB appearance
- April 14, 2010, for the Washington Nationals

MLB statistics
- Win–loss record: 12–24
- Earned run average: 5.04
- Strikeouts: 299
- Stats at Baseball Reference

Teams
- Washington Nationals (2005–2010)

Jason Christopher Bergmann (born September 25, 1981) is an American former professional baseball pitcher. He was born in Neptune Township, New Jersey, and grew up in Manalapan Township, New Jersey where he played high school baseball at Manalapan High School. In college, he played for Rutgers University.

== Career ==
=== Washington Nationals ===
==== 2006 season ====
Bergmann began the 2006 season pitching at the Triple-A level at the Nationals' affiliate, the New Orleans Zephyrs, but was called up after the Nationals traded Liván Hernández to the Arizona Diamondbacks.

==== 2007 season ====
In 2007, he was converted from a reliever to a starting pitcher by the Nationals. After a disastrous first game (in which he allowed 4 runs on 5 hits and 6 walks in 3 2/3 innings), he pitched very well, posting a combined 2.41 ERA over his subsequent six starts, three times pitching six or more innings and allowing two or fewer hits, but, mostly due to lack of run support, no wins.

Finally, on May 14, against the Atlanta Braves Bergmann pitched a gem: he struck out five of the first six batters he faced, pitching seven no-hit innings, and finishing with 8+ innings pitched, allowing just 2 hits, one run, 10 K's, and one walk. It was his first win of the season, and the first win as a starter in his career. By the end of the game, opponents were hitting .162 against Bergmann, best in the Majors. After the game, however, he complained of elbow soreness, was put on the 15-day DL, and ended up missing a month, returning on June 26 (throwing four innings, four hits, one run against the Braves).

For the 2007 season as a whole, Bergmann accrued a win-loss record of 6-6 and a 4.45 ERA, striking out 86 batters and walking 42 over 115 1/3 innings.

During the 2007-2008 off-season, Bergmann pitched for Tigres del Licey in the Dominican Winter Baseball League. In his four starts, he pitched a total of 19 1/3 innings, compiling a 1–0 record and a 3.72 ERA, while striking out 11 batters and walking 3.

==== 2008 season ====
Bergmann suffered a disappointing season with a 2–11 record and 5.09 ERA due in part to the extremely poor Nationals lineup. At the start of the season Bergmann was quickly sent down in the April to the Columbus Clippers. There he earned the International League Pitcher of the Week. Bergmann was then brought back to the majors and experienced some immediate success including 19 2/3 straight scoreless innings on the mound. Unfortunately the Nationals (the MLB's worst hitting team) performed especially poorly with Bergmann on the mound, scoring only 3.1 runs per game in support in total, only 2.4 of which were scored during the time he was pitching . Of his 22 starts, 10 were quality, yet the team was only able to convert 5 to wins, with 3 quality starts being blown by the bullpen.

==== 2009 season ====
Bergmann opened the season with the Triple-A Syracuse Chiefs. He pitched 23.1 innings there, going 1–1 with a 1.16 ERA. He would later be recalled and went 2–4 in 48 innings with a 4.50 earned run average as a part of the 59-103 last-place Nationals. He was designated for assignment on April 15, 2010. He cleared waivers and was sent outright to Triple-A Syracuse Chiefs on April 23. He elected free agency on October 6.

=== Oakland Athletics ===
On December 3, 2010, Bergmann signed a minor league contract with the Boston Red Sox, but the deal was voided on March 12, 2011, after he showed up to Spring Training with a shoulder issue. He was signed to a minor league contract by the Oakland Athletics on June 1, and assigned to the Double-A Midland RockHounds. He elected free agency on November 2.

=== Camden Riversharks ===
On March 15, 2012, Bergmann signed with the Camden Riversharks of the Atlantic League of Professional Baseball. In 22 games 22.1 innings of relief he went 0-0 with a stellar 0.81 ERA with 33 strikeouts and 1 save.

=== Colorado Rockies ===
On June 20, 2012, Bergmann signed a minor league contract with the Colorado Rockies. The right-hander yielded a 6.98 ERA and a WHIP close to 2.00 in 40 innings over 28 appearances in the minors. He elected free agency on November 2.

=== Sugar Land Skeeters ===
On February 17, 2013, Bergmann signed with the Sugar Land Skeeters of the Atlantic League of Professional Baseball. Bergmann became the Sugar Land Skeeters' closer after working as a set-up man for Camden previously. He made 30 relief appearances for the team and in just his second season with the Atlantic League, he was named an All-Star. The right-hander held a 2–0 record with a 0.30 ERA (1ER/30IP) and a team-best 18 saves in as many opportunities. His 18 saves also ranked second in the Atlantic League.

=== Kansas City Royals ===
On July 5, 2013, the Skeeters sold his contract to Kansas City Royals. He elected free agency on November 4.
