= Chad Cordero =

American baseball player (born 1982)

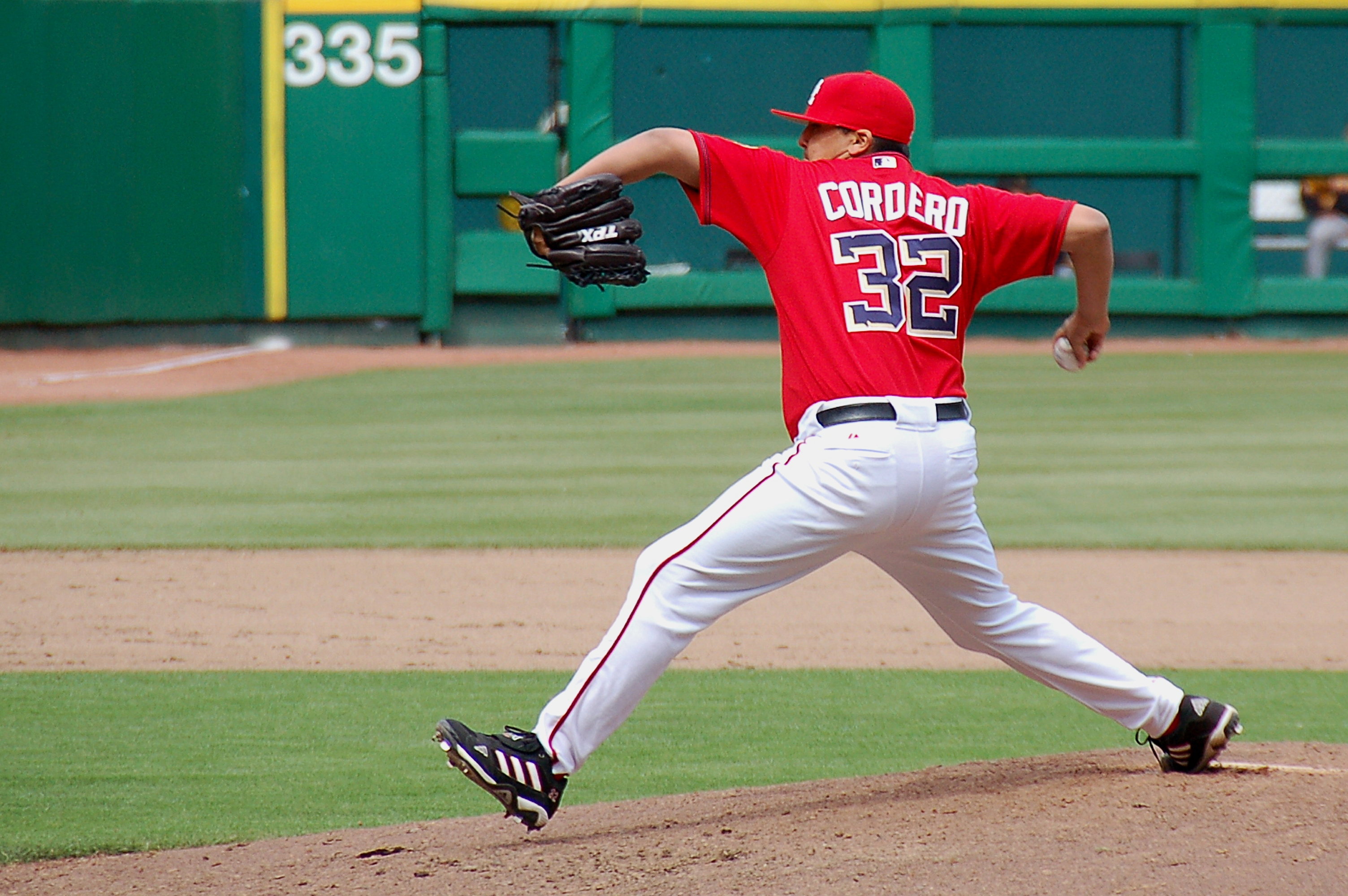
- Cordero with the Washington Nationals
- Pitcher
- Born: March 18, 1982 (age 44); Upland, California, U.S.
- Batted: Right Threw: Right

MLB debut
- August 30, 2003, for the Montreal Expos

Last MLB appearance
- July 9, 2010, for the Seattle Mariners

MLB statistics
- Win–loss record: 20–15
- Earned run average: 2.89
- Strikeouts: 298
- Saves: 128
- Stats at Baseball Reference

Teams
- Montreal Expos / Washington Nationals (2003–2008); Seattle Mariners (2010)

Career highlights and awards
- All-Star (2005); NL Rolaids Relief Man Award (2005); NL saves leader (2005)

Chad Patrick Cordero (born March 18, 1982) is an American former professional baseball pitcher. Cordero played in Major League Baseball (MLB) for the Montreal Expos / Washington Nationals and Seattle Mariners.

Cordero's best season was in 2005, when he was an All-Star and won the Rolaids Relief Man Award. From 2005 to 2007, he recorded 113 saves, second most in the National League behind Trevor Hoffman's 131.

== Biography ==
=== College years ===
At age 18, Cordero was drafted by the San Diego Padres in the 26th round of the 2000 MLB draft, but he chose to enroll at Cal State Fullerton, where he was a standout reliever. With an ERA of under 1.83 he made the 1st team All-America Freshman team and was selected to the Big West All-Conference team, the latter of which he repeated in each of his next two years. In 2003, he was the Fullerton Regional MVP (College World Series), and then was drafted by the Expos in the 1st round (20th overall).

=== Montreal Expos/Washington Nationals ===
==== First two years ====
Cordero pitched briefly in 2003, and then appeared in 69 games for the Expos in 2004, compiling an ERA of 2.94, usually appearing as a closer. He earned a save in the last Montreal Expo victory in Hiram Bithorn Stadium on July 11, 2004. He also threw the final pitch for the Expos at Olympic Stadium on September 29, 2004, and the final pitch for a win on October 2 against the New York Mets at Shea Stadium.

==== 2005 ====
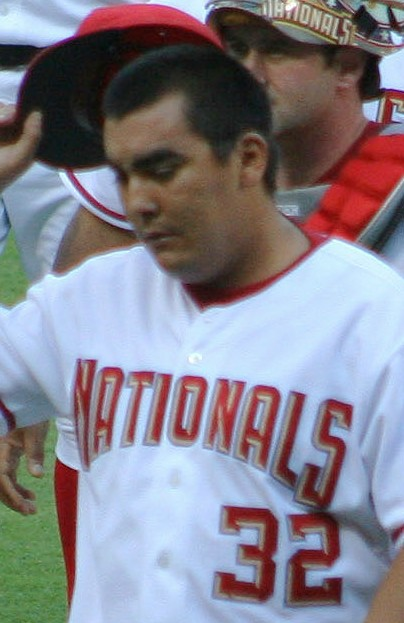
Cordero in 2007

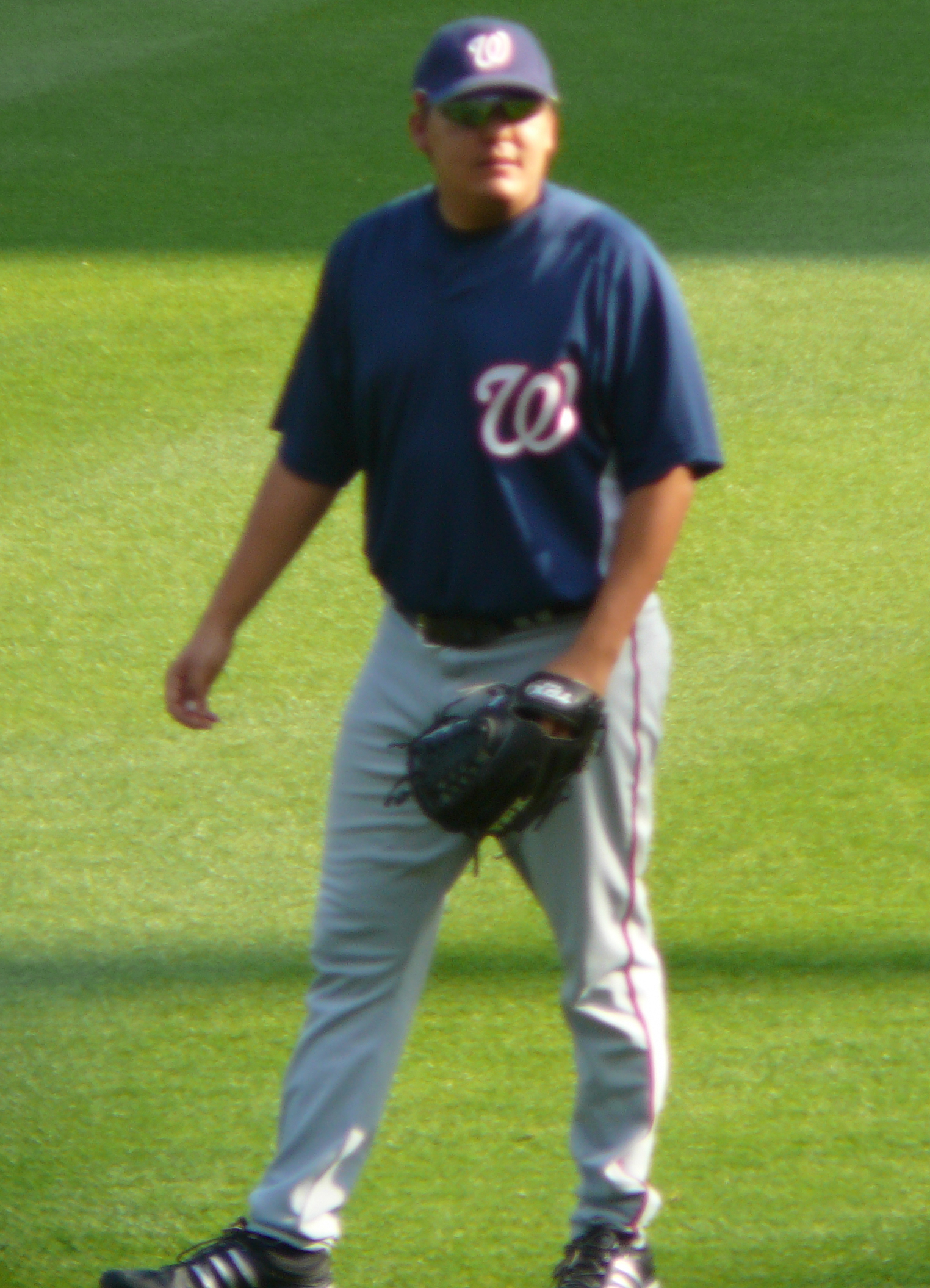
Cordero with the Nationals in 2008

The Expos became the Washington Nationals in 2005, and Cordero had a career-best season. In June 2005, Cordero tied the major league record for saves in one month with 15. He shares the record with Lee Smith and John Wetteland. He also converted his 24th consecutive save, breaking the club record held by Mel Rojas. On September 9, 2005, Cordero's 44th save broke the franchise record. He completed the 2005 season with 47 saves, leading the major leagues, and was selected to the National League pitching staff for the 2005 MLB All-Star game, facing one batter, Iván Rodríguez, and striking him out. He was the 2005 Washington Nationals Player of the Year, and won the National League Rolaids Relief Man of the Year Award.

==== 2006 ====
In February 2006, Cordero and his teammate Brian Schneider were chosen to play for Team USA in the World Baseball Classic. During the season, however, his production tailed off. While he still got 29 saves (8th best in the league), his ERA went from 1.82 to 3.19.

==== 2007 ====
In the beginning of the 2007 season, Cordero faced a tough time against batters. By May 6, his ERA was 4.70. Cordero admitted he was distracted by the illness of his ailing grandmother, and missed six games for personal bereavement leave. He came back a changed man, and starting May 16 made 12 consecutive appearances without allowing a run. On June 13, Cordero (at age 25 years and 86 days) became the second youngest player in baseball history to reach 100 saves in a career. (Francisco Rodríguez is the youngest at 24 years and 246 days old.) Echoing his final pitches at Olympic Stadium and Hiram Bithorn Stadium in 2004, Cordero closed out the final Nationals game at RFK stadium getting a save on September 23, 2007. He threw the final pitch at three different home stadiums for the same franchise.

==== 2008 ====
Cordero missed almost all of the 2008 season after undergoing surgery to repair a labrum tear, an injury he suffered in April. On October 30, 2008, the Nationals sent him outright to AAA Syracuse, and he rejected the assignment, becoming a free agent. Among other reasons for Cordero's rejection was that he was displeased with how he found out that he would be "non-tendered" by the Nationals at the end of the season—via an impromptu comment made by Nationals' GM Jim Bowden on a radio show in July.

=== Seattle Mariners ===
On March 12, 2009, Cordero signed a minor league contract with the Seattle Mariners with an invitation to spring training. He was to compete for the closer role once he fully recovered from surgery and began the 2010 season with the Triple-A Tacoma Rainiers. The Mariners called him up on June 3, taking the spot of the retired Ken Griffey Jr. On July 15, he refused a minor league assignment and became a free agent. In his final 9 games in the majors, Cordero was 0–1 with a 6.52 ERA with the Mariners.

=== New York Mets ===
On July 22, 2010, Cordero agreed on a minor league deal with the New York Mets and was assigned to Triple-A Buffalo. He elected free agency following the season on November 6.

=== Toronto Blue Jays ===
On January 4, 2011, Cordero signed a minor league contract with an invite to spring training with the Toronto Blue Jays. He was released on May 15.

=== St. Paul Saints ===
On June 3, 2011, Cordero signed with the St. Paul Saints of the American Association of Professional Baseball. with the St. Paul Saints of the American Association of Independent Professional Baseball, but retired on June 20, 2011. In 7 games 6 innings of relief he struggled mightily going 0-1 with a 13.50 ERA with 5 strikeouts.

=== Los Angeles Angels ===
On February 13, 2013, Cordero signed a minor league contract with the Los Angeles Angels of Anaheim due to his desire to play again. He was assigned to the Inland Empire 66ers of the California League, the (high) Class-A affiliate of the Angels, to begin the season. He elected free agency following the season on November 4.

== Personal life ==
Cordero has three children. One of his children, Tehya, died of Sudden Infant Death Syndrome in 2010. He was married but is now separated.

== See also ==
- List of Major League Baseball annual saves leaders
