= Chris Booker (baseball) =

American baseball player (born 1976)

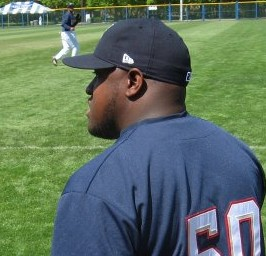
- Pitcher
- Born: December 9, 1976 (age 49); Monroeville, Alabama, U.S.
- Batted: Right Threw: Right

MLB debut
- September 5, 2005, for the Cincinnati Reds

Last MLB appearance
- July 25, 2007, for the Washington Nationals

MLB statistics
- Win–loss record: 0–1
- Earned run average: 14.29
- Strikeouts: 10
- Stats at Baseball Reference

Former teams
- Cincinnati Reds (2005); Kansas City Royals (2006); Washington Nationals (2006–2007)

Chris Booker
Medal record

Men's baseball

Representing United States

Baseball World Cup
Gold medal – first place	2007 Tianmu	National team

Christopher Scott Booker (born December 9, 1976) is an American former Major League Baseball pitcher. He is currently the pitching coach for the Billings Mustangs.

Booker was drafted in the 20th round of the 1995 amateur draft by the Chicago Cubs. He'd remain in the Cubs organization until the 2001 season where he was acquired by the Cincinnati Reds. Booker remained four years at the minor league level before making his major league debut in 2005. The Washington Nationals signed him as a free agent in November 2005. The Detroit Tigers drafted him in the December 2005 Rule 5 draft and he was immediately purchased from the Tigers by the Philadelphia Phillies. The Kansas City Royals selected him off of waivers on May 12, 2006. In his only appearance with Kansas City on May 13, 2006, Booker gave up three home runs in an inning. Booker was then placed on the disabled list with a groin injury. He was returned to the Nationals by the Royals on July 14, 2006. Booker made a career high 10 appearances out of the Washington bullpen in 2006. He retired after the 2008 season.

== See also ==
- Rule 5 draft results
