= 2007 Philadelphia Phillies season =

Major League Baseball season

2007 Philadelphia Phillies
- National League East champions
- League: National League
- Division: East
- Ballpark: Citizens Bank Park
- City: Philadelphia
- Record: 89–73 (.549)
- Divisional place: 1st
- Owners: Bill Giles
- General managers: Pat Gillick
- Managers: Charlie Manuel
- Television: Comcast Sports Net; CN8; WPSG-TV (CW 57); KYW-TV; Harry Kalas, Chris Wheeler, Larry Andersen, Scott Franzke, Gary Matthews
- Radio: WPHT 1210 AM; Harry Kalas, Chris Wheeler, Larry Andersen, Scott Franzke; WUBA-AM 1480 AM (Spanish)

The 2007 Philadelphia Phillies season was the 125th season in the history of the franchise. It would begin with the Phillies approaching a historic mark. The Phillies started the year with an MLB-record 9,955 losses in franchise history. On July 15, they lost their 10,000th game to the St. Louis Cardinals, becoming the first professional sports team in modern history to reach that milestone. The Phillies rallied in the closing days of the season, winning their final game against the Washington Nationals. This win and the New York Mets' loss to the Florida Marlins gave the Phillies the National League East title, resulting in the Phillies clinching a postseason berth for the first time since 1993. They were swept in the NLDS by the Colorado Rockies.

== Regular season ==
Trailing the Mets by seven games with seventeen left to play, the Phillies went on a 13–4 stretch that got them the first of five consecutive division championships. It was also the franchise's first playoff appearance since 1993.

=== National League East ===
NL East
| Team | W | L | Pct. | GB | Home | Road |
|---|---|---|---|---|---|---|
| Philadelphia Phillies | 89 | 73 | .549 | — | 47‍–‍34 | 42‍–‍39 |
| New York Mets | 88 | 74 | .543 | 1 | 41‍–‍40 | 47‍–‍34 |
| Atlanta Braves | 84 | 78 | .519 | 5 | 44‍–‍37 | 40‍–‍41 |
| Washington Nationals | 73 | 89 | .451 | 16 | 40‍–‍41 | 33‍–‍48 |
| Florida Marlins | 71 | 91 | .438 | 18 | 36‍–‍45 | 35‍–‍46 |

=== Record vs. opponents ===
2007 National League record Source: MLB Standings Grid – 2007
| Team | AZ | ATL | CHC | CIN | COL | FLA | HOU | LAD | MIL | NYM | PHI | PIT | SD | SF | STL | WAS | AL |
|---|---|---|---|---|---|---|---|---|---|---|---|---|---|---|---|---|---|
| Arizona | — | 4–2 | 4–2 | 2–4 | 8–10 | 6–1 | 5–2 | 8–10 | 2–5 | 3–4 | 5–1 | 5–4 | 10–8 | 10–8 | 4–3 | 6–1 | 8–7 |
| Atlanta | 2–4 | — | 5–4 | 1–6 | 4–2 | 10–8 | 3–3 | 4–3 | 5–2 | 9–9 | 9–9 | 5–1 | 5–2 | 4–3 | 3–4 | 11–7 | 4–11 |
| Chicago | 2–4 | 4–5 | — | 9–9 | 5–2 | 0–6 | 8–7 | 2–5 | 9–6 | 2–5 | 3–4 | 8–7 | 3–5 | 5–2 | 11–5 | 6–1 | 8–4 |
| Cincinnati | 4–2 | 6–1 | 9–9 | — | 2–4 | 4–3 | 4–11 | 2–4 | 8–7 | 2–5 | 2–4 | 9–7 | 2–4 | 4–3 | 6–9 | 1–6 | 7-11 |
| Colorado | 10–8 | 2–4 | 2–5 | 4–2 | — | 3–3 | 3–4 | 12–6 | 4–2 | 4–2 | 4–3 | 4–3 | 11–8 | 10–8 | 3–4 | 4–3 | 10–8 |
| Florida | 1–6 | 8–10 | 6–0 | 3–4 | 3–3 | — | 2–3 | 4–3 | 2–5 | 7–11 | 9–9 | 3–4 | 3–4 | 1–6 | 2–4 | 8–10 | 9–9 |
| Houston | 2–5 | 3–3 | 7–8 | 11–4 | 4–3 | 3-2 | — | 4–3 | 5–13 | 2–5 | 3–3 | 5–10 | 4–3 | 2–4 | 7–9 | 2–5 | 9–9 |
| Los Angeles | 10–8 | 3–4 | 5–2 | 4–2 | 6–12 | 3–4 | 3–4 | — | 3–3 | 5–5 | 4–2 | 5–2 | 8–10 | 10–8 | 3–3 | 5–1 | 5–10 |
| Milwaukee | 5–2 | 2–5 | 6–9 | 7–8 | 2–4 | 5–2 | 13–5 | 3–3 | — | 2–4 | 3–4 | 10–6 | 2–5 | 4–5 | 7–8 | 4–2 | 8–7 |
| New York | 4–3 | 9–9 | 5–2 | 5–2 | 2–4 | 11–7 | 5–2 | 5–5 | 4–2 | — | 6–12 | 4–2 | 2–4 | 4–2 | 5–2 | 9–9 | 8–7 |
| Philadelphia | 1-5 | 9–9 | 4–3 | 4–2 | 3–4 | 9–9 | 3–3 | 2–4 | 4–3 | 12–6 | — | 4–2 | 4–3 | 4–4 | 6–3 | 12–6 | 8–7 |
| Pittsburgh | 4–5 | 1–5 | 7–8 | 7–9 | 3–4 | 4–3 | 10–5 | 2–5 | 6–10 | 2–4 | 2–4 | — | 1–6 | 4–2 | 6–12 | 4–2 | 5–10 |
| San Diego | 8–10 | 2–5 | 5–3 | 4–2 | 8–11 | 4–3 | 3–4 | 10–8 | 5–2 | 4–2 | 3–4 | 6–1 | — | 14–4 | 3–4 | 4–2 | 6–9 |
| San Francisco | 8–10 | 3–4 | 2–5 | 3–4 | 8–10 | 6–1 | 4–2 | 8–10 | 5–4 | 2–4 | 4–4 | 2–4 | 4–14 | — | 4–1 | 3–4 | 5–10 |
| St. Louis | 3–4 | 4–3 | 5–11 | 9–6 | 4–3 | 4-2 | 9–7 | 3–3 | 8–7 | 2–5 | 3–6 | 12–6 | 4–3 | 1–4 | — | 1–5 | 6–9 |
| Washington | 1–6 | 7–11 | 1–6 | 6–1 | 3–4 | 10-8 | 5–2 | 1–5 | 2–4 | 9–9 | 6–12 | 2–4 | 2–4 | 4–3 | 5–1 | — | 9–9 |

=== Transactions ===
- September 4, 2007: Pete LaForest was selected off waivers by the Philadelphia Phillies from the San Diego Padres.

=== Roster ===
2007 Philadelphia Phillies
Roster
| Pitchers: 57 Antonio Alfonseca; 46 Joseph Bisenius; 52 Fabio Castro; 55 Clay Condrey; 48 Kane Davis; 52 J. D. Durbin; 23 Adam Eaton; 46 John Ennis; 61 Anderson García; 34 Freddy García; 56 Geoff Geary; 45 Tom Gordon; 35 Cole Hamels; 66 J. A. Happ; 44 Yoel Hernández; 38 Kyle Kendrick; 21 Jon Lieber; 37 Kyle Lohse; 63 Ryan Madson; 49 José Mesa; 50 Jamie Moyer; 39 Brett Myers; 16 J. C. Romero; 54 Francisco Rosario; 48 Brian Sanches; 37 Zack Segovia; 40 Matt Smith; 59 Mike Zagurski | Catchers: 2 Rod Barajas; 27 Chris Coste; 51 Carlos Ruiz; Infielders: 4 Russell Branyan; 19 Greg Dobbs; 18 Wes Helms; 6 Ryan Howard; 12 Tadahito Iguchi; 3 Abraham Núñez; 11 Jimmy Rollins; 26 Chase Utley | Outfielders: 9 Michael Bourn; 5 Pat Burrell; 29 Chris Roberson; 33 Aaron Rowand; 8 Shane Victorino; 28 Jayson Werth; Other batters: 4 Pete LaForest | Manager: 41 Charlie Manuel; Coaches: 17 Mick Billmeyer (catching); 28 Rich Dubee (pitching); 31 Ramon Henderson (bullpen); 15 Davey Lopes (first base); 7 Steve Smith (third base); 25 Milt Thompson (hitting); 22 Jimy Williams (bench) |

=== Game log ===
2007 game log
April (11–14)

| # | Date | Opponent | Score | Win | Loss | Save | Attendance | Record |
|---|---|---|---|---|---|---|---|---|
| 1 | April 2 | Braves | 5–3 (10) | Wickman (1–0) | Madson (0–1) | Paronto (1) | 44,742 | 0–1 |
| 2 | April 4 | Braves | 3–2 (11) | McBride (1–0) | Madson (0–2) | Wickman (1) | 41,516 | 0–2 |
| 3 | April 5 | Braves | 8–4 | James (1–0) | Eaton (0–1) | Soriano (1) | 30,062 | 0–3 |
| 4 | April 6 | @ Marlins | 8–2 | Moyer (1–0) | Mitre (0–1) | | 40,397 | 1–3 |
| 5 | April 7 | @ Marlins | 8–5 | Willis (2–0) | Myers (0–1) | | 32,419 | 1–4 |
| 6 | April 8 | @ Marlins | 6–4 | Olsen (2–0) | Segovia (0–1) | Gardner (1) | 16,308 | 1–5 |
| 7 | April 9 | @ Mets | 11–5 | Feliciano (1–0) | Geary (0–1) | | 56,227 | 1–6 |
| 8 | April 11 | @ Mets | 5–2 | Eaton (1–1) | Pérez (1–1) | Gordon (1) | 41,927 | 2–6 |
| 9 | April 12 | @ Mets | 5–3 | Glavine (2–1) | Moyer (1–1) | Wagner (2) | 33,355 | 2–7 |
| 10 | April 13 | Astros | 9–6 | Oswalt (2–0) | Myers (0–2) | Wheeler (2) | 44,336 | 2–8 |
| 11 | April 14 | Astros | 8–5 | Hamels (1–0) | Williams (0–2) | Gordon (2) | 35,387 | 3–8 |
| – | April 15 | Astros | Postponed (rain) – made up April 23 | | | | | 3–8 |
| – | April 16 | Mets | Postponed (rain) – made up June 29 | | | | | 3–8 |
| 12 | April 17 | Mets | 8–1 | Glavine (3–1) | García (0–1) | | 27,058 | 3–9 |
| 13 | April 18 | @ Nationals | 5–4 (13) | Speigner (1–0) | Rosario (0–1) | | 18,584 | 3–10 |
| 14 | April 19 | @ Nationals | 4–2 | Moyer (2–1) | Patterson (0–3) | Gordon (3) | 18,671 | 4–10 |
| 15 | April 20 | @ Reds | 2–1 (10) | Coutlangus (1–0) | Gordon (0–1) | | 32,962 | 4–11 |
| 16 | April 21 | @ Reds | 4–1 | Hamels (2–0) | Milton (0–3) | | 39,353 | 5–11 |
| 17 | April 22 | @ Reds | 9–3 | García (1–1) | Belisle (2–1) | | 29,717 | 6–11 |
| 18 | April 23 | Astros | 11–4 | Eaton (2–1) | Sampson (2–1) | | 32,517 | 7–11 |
| 19 | April 24 | Nationals | 6–3 | Alfonseca (1–0) | Bowie (0–1) | Gordon (4) | 24,745 | 8–11 |
| 20 | April 25 | Nationals | 9–3 | Lieber (1–0) | Patterson (0–4) | | 23,526 | 9–11 |
| 21 | April 26 | Nationals | 4–2 | Hill (2–2) | Hamels (2–1) | Cordero (2) | 26,572 | 9–12 |
| 22 | April 27 | Marlins | 6–5 | Gordon (1–1) | Messenger (0–1) | | 32,331 | 10–12 |
| 23 | April 28 | Marlins | 11–5 | Willis (5–1) | Eaton (2–2) | | 36,914 | 10–13 |
| 24 | April 29 | Marlins | 6–1 | Moyer (3–1) | Obermueller (1–1) | | 45,107 | 11–13 |
| 25 | April 30 | @ Braves | 5–2 | González (1–0) | Alfonseca (1–1) | | 20,354 | 11–14 |

May (15–13)

| # | Date | Opponent | Score | Win | Loss | Save | Attendance | Record |
|---|---|---|---|---|---|---|---|---|
| 26 | May 1 | @ Braves | 6–4 | Hamels (3–1) | Redman (0–4) | Gordon (5) | 19,670 | 12–14 |
| 27 | May 2 | @ Braves | 4–3 | Paronto (1–0) | García (1–2) | Soriano (2) | 23,647 | 12–15 |
| 28 | May 3 | @ Giants | 9–7 | Eaton (3–2) | Cain (1–2) | Myers (1) | 33,466 | 13–15 |
| 29 | May 4 | @ Giants | 6–2 | Morris (4–1) | Moyer (3–2) | | 39,265 | 13–16 |
| 30 | May 5 | @ Giants | 9–4 | Lowry (4–2) | Lieber (1–1) | | 40,796 | 13–17 |
| 31 | May 6 | @ Giants | 8–5 | Hamels (4–1) | Chulk (0–2) | Myers (2) | 38,738 | 14–17 |
| 32 | May 7 | @ D-backs | 4–3 | Lyon (3–1) | Rosario (0–2) | Valverde (12) | 19,592 | 14–18 |
| 33 | May 8 | @ D-backs | 3–2 | Owings (2–1) | Eaton (3–3) | Peña (1) | 22,888 | 14–19 |
| 34 | May 9 | @ D-backs | 9–3 | Moyer (4–2) | Medders (1–1) | Myers (3) | 25,286 | 15–19 |
| 35 | May 11 | Cubs | 7–2 | Hamels (5–1) | Hill (4–2) | | 42,473 | 16–19 |
| 36 | May 12 | Cubs | 11–7 | Alfonseca (2–1) | Howry (0–3) | | 45,026 | 17–19 |
| 37 | May 13 | Cubs | 4–1 | Lilly (3–2) | Lieber (1–2) | Dempster (8) | 45,129 | 17–20 |
| 38 | May 14 | Brewers | 8–6 | Condrey (1–0) | Turnbow (1–1) | Myers (4) | 29,183 | 18–20 |
| 39 | May 15 | Brewers | 4–3 | Myers (1–2) | Turnbow (1–2) | | 41,258 | 19–20 |
| 40 | May 16 | Brewers | 6–2 | Hamels (6–1) | Suppan (5–4) | | 42,713 | 20–20 |
| 41 | May 17 | Brewers | 3–2 | Sheets (4–2) | García (1–3) | Cordero (16) | 31,553 | 20–21 |
| 42 | May 18 | Blue Jays | 5–3 | Lieber (2–2) | McGowan (0–1) | Myers (5) | 34,723 | 21–21 |
| 43 | May 19 | Blue Jays | 13–2 | Marcum (2–2) | Moyer (4–3) | | 32,004 | 21–22 |
| 44 | May 20 | Blue Jays | 5–3 | Eaton (4–3) | Litsch (1–1) | Myers (6) | 39,030 | 22–22 |
| 45 | May 22 | @ Marlins | 5–3 | Olsen (4–3) | Hamels (6–2) | Gregg (4) | 11,162 | 22–23 |
| 46 | May 23 | @ Marlins | 8–7 (10) | Condrey (2–0) | Gregg (0–2) | | 11,575 | 23–23 |
| 47 | May 24 | @ Marlins | 5–4 (11) | Gardner (1–2) | Rosario (0–3) | | 11,811 | 23–24 |
| 48 | May 25 | @ Braves | 8–3 | Moyer (5–3) | Hudson (5–3) | | 35,402 | 24–24 |
| 49 | May 26 | @ Braves | 6–4 | Eaton (5–3) | Carlyle (0–1) | Alfonseca (1) | 40,122 | 25–24 |
| 50 | May 27 | @ Braves | 13–6 | Hamels (7–2) | Davies (2–3) | | 38,058 | 26–24 |
| 51 | May 28 | D-backs | 5–4 | Davis (3–6) | García (1–4) | Lyon (2) | 41,985 | 26–25 |
| 52 | May 29 | D-backs | 11–5 | Owings (4–1) | Lieber (2–3) | | 27,643 | 26–26 |
| 53 | May 30 | D-backs | 4–3 | Johnson (3–2) | Moyer (5–4) | Valverde (19) | 33,281 | 26–27 |

June (15–13)

| # | Date | Opponent | Score | Win | Loss | Save | Attendance | Record |
|---|---|---|---|---|---|---|---|---|
| 54 | June 1 | Giants | 13–0 | Morris (6–2) | Eaton (5–4) | | 38,164 | 26–28 |
| 55 | June 2 | Giants | 5–2 | Hamels (8–2) | Lowry (5–5) | | 45,153 | 27–28 |
| 56 | June 3 | Giants | 9–8 | Alfonseca (3–1) | Correia (1–2) | | 39,293 | 28–28 |
| 57 | June 4 | Giants | 8–1 | Zito (6–5) | Lieber (2–4) | | 33,967 | 28–29 |
| 58 | June 5 | @ Mets | 4–2 (11) | Geary (1–1) | Feliciano (1–1) | Alfonseca (2) | 43,078 | 29–29 |
| 59 | June 6 | @ Mets | 4–2 | Eaton (6–4) | Heilman (5–3) | Alfonseca (3) | 42,696 | 30–29 |
| 60 | June 7 | @ Mets | 6–3 (10) | Zagurski (1–0) | Schoeneweis (0–1) | Alfonseca (4) | 43,398 | 31–29 |
| 61 | June 8 | @ Royals | 8–4 | Elarton (2–2) | García (1–5) | Dotel (3) | 19,121 | 31–30 |
| 62 | June 9 | @ Royals | 4–0 | Lieber (3–4) | Meche (3–6) | | 23,734 | 32–30 |
| 63 | June 10 | @ Royals | 17–5 | Greinke (3–4) | Moyer (5–5) | | 16,034 | 32–31 |
| 64 | June 11 | White Sox | 3–0 | Eaton (7–4) | Vázquez (3–5) | Alfonseca (5) | 31,989 | 33–31 |
| 65 | June 12 | White Sox | 7–3 | Hamels (9–2) | Contreras (4–7) | | 34,529 | 34–31 |
| 66 | June 13 | White Sox | 8–4 | Madson (1–2) | Thornton (2–2) | | 42,677 | 35–31 |
| 67 | June 15 | Tigers | 12–8 | Bonderman (7–0) | Lieber (3–5) | | 42,719 | 35–32 |
| 68 | June 16 | Tigers | 6–3 | Moyer (6–5) | Miller (2–1) | | 45,102 | 36–32 |
| 69 | June 17 | Tigers | 7–4 | Verlander (7–2) | Geary (1–2) | Jones (17) | 45,537 | 36–33 |
| 70 | June 18 | @ Indians | 10–1 | Lee (3–4) | Hamels (9–3) | | 18,710 | 36–34 |
| 71 | June 19 | @ Indians | 9–6 | Kendrick (1–0) | Stanford (1–1) | | 17,371 | 37–34 |
| 72 | June 20 | @ Indians | 10–6 | Sabathia (10–2) | Lieber (3–6) | | 24,278 | 37–35 |
| 73 | June 22 | @ Cardinals | 6–0 | Moyer (7–5) | Reyes (0–9) | | 45,360 | 38–35 |
| 74 | June 23 | @ Cardinals | 8–3 | Wainwright (6–6) | Eaton (7–5) | | 45,336 | 38–36 |
| 75 | June 24 | @ Cardinals | 5–1 | Sanches (1–0) | Thompson (5–3) | | 44,899 | 39–36 |
| 76 | June 26 | Reds | 11–4 | Kendrick (2–0) | Bailey (2–1) | | 35,314 | 40–36 |
| 77 | June 27 | Reds | 9–6 | McBeth (2–1) | Sanches (1–1) | Weathers (15) | 31,803 | 40–37 |
| 78 | June 28 | Reds | 8–7 (10) | Condrey (3–0) | Santos (1–3) | | 44,323 | 41–37 |
| 79 | June 29 | Mets | 6–5 | Hernández (4–3) | Durbin (0–1) | Wagner (16) | 35,849 | 41–38 |
| 80 | June 29 | Mets | 5–2 | Maine (9–4) | Hamels (9–4) | | 45,165 | 41–39 |
| 81 | June 30 | Mets | 8–3 | Sosa (7–3) | Happ (0–1) | Feliciano (1) | 45,003 | 41–40 |

July (15–10)

| # | Date | Opponent | Score | Win | Loss | Save | Attendance | Record |
|---|---|---|---|---|---|---|---|---|
| 82 | July 1 | Mets | 5–3 | Kendrick (2–0) | Pelfrey (0–6) | Alfonseca (6) | 45,289 | 42–40 |
| 83 | July 2 | @ Astros | 7–5 | Williams (4–10) | Moyer (7–6) | Miller (1) | 28,973 | 42–41 |
| 84 | July 3 | @ Astros | 5–4 (13) | Albers (2–4) | Mesa (0–1) | | 37,993 | 42–42 |
| 85 | July 4 | @ Astros | 8–3 | Hamels (10–4) | Sampson (6–6) | | 39,993 | 43–42 |
| 86 | July 6 | @ Rockies | 7–6 (11) | Corpas (3–2) | Durbin (0–2) | | 29,239 | 43–43 |
| 87 | July 7 | @ Rockies | 6–3 | López (5–2) | Moyer (7–7) | Corpas (1) | 35,196 | 43–44 |
| 88 | July 8 | @ Rockies | 8–4 | Eaton (8–5) | Cook (5–6) | Madson (1) | 25,119 | 44–44 |
| 89 | July 13 | Cardinals | 13–3 | Kendrick (4–0) | Wells (3–12) | | 43,838 | 45–44 |
| 90 | July 14 | Cardinals | 10–4 | Hamels (11–4) | Maroth (5–4) | | 45,050 | 46–44 |
| 91 | July 15 | Cardinals | 10–2 | Wainwright (8–7) | Eaton (8–6) | | 44,872 | 46–45 |
| 92 | July 16 | @ Dodgers | 10–3 | Penny (11–1) | Moyer (7–8) | | 41,458 | 46–46 |
| 93 | July 17 | @ Dodgers | 15–3 | Durbin (1–2) | Hendrickson (4–5) | | 45,074 | 47–46 |
| 94 | July 18 | @ Dodgers | 5–4 | Seánez (6–1) | Kendrick (4–1) | Saito (25) | 47,114 | 47–47 |
| 95 | July 19 | @ Padres | 1–0 | Young (9–3) | Hamels (11–5) | Hoffman (27) | 30,885 | 47–48 |
| 96 | July 20 | @ Padres | 7–3 | Eaton (9–6) | Germano (6–4) | Alfonseca (7) | 36,113 | 48–48 |
| 97 | July 21 | @ Padres | 12–4 | Moyer (8–8) | Wells (5–6) | | 40,917 | 49–48 |
| 98 | July 22 | @ Padres | 9–0 | Durbin (2–2) | Peavy (9–5) | | 37,986 | 50–48 |
| 99 | July 24 | Nationals | 4–3 | Madson (2–2) | Ayala (0–2) | Alfonseca (8) | 40,110 | 51–48 |
| 100 | July 25 | Nationals | 7–5 (14) | Condrey (4–0) | Booker (0–1) | | 44,931 | 52–48 |
| 101 | July 26 | Nationals | 7–6 | Rauch (6–2) | Mesa (1–3) | Cordero (20) | 43,413 | 52–49 |
| 102 | July 27 | Pirates | 8–1 (7) | Moyer (9–8) | Van Benschoten (0–5) | | 37,136 | 53–49 |
| 103 | July 28 | Pirates | 10–5 | Durbin (3–2) | Youman (2–3) | | 45,149 | 54–49 |
| 104 | July 29 | Pirates | 5–1 | Kendrick (5–1) | Snell (7–9) | | 40,030 | 55–49 |
| 105 | July 30 | @ Cubs | 4–1 | Hamels (12–5) | Lilly (11–5) | Myers (7) | 41,686 | 56–49 |
| 106 | July 31 | @ Cubs | 7–3 | Marquis (8–6) | Eaton (9–7) | | 40,495 | 56–50 |

August (16–12)

| # | Date | Opponent | Score | Win | Loss | Save | Attendance | Record |
|---|---|---|---|---|---|---|---|---|
| 107 | August 1 | @ Cubs | 5–4 | Dempster (2–3) | Myers (1–3) | | 40,558 | 56–51 |
| 108 | August 2 | @ Cubs | 10–6 | Durbin (4–2) | Marshall (5–5) | | 40,988 | 57–51 |
| 109 | August 3 | @ Brewers | 2–1 | Gallardo (4–1) | Kendrick (5–2) | Cordero (33) | 39,483 | 57–52 |
| 110 | August 4 | @ Brewers | 6–5 | Turnbow (3–4) | Gordon (1–2) | Cordero (34) | 42,126 | 57–53 |
| 111 | August 5 | @ Brewers | 8–6 (11) | Myers (2–3) | Parra (0–1) | Mesa (1) | 43,716 | 58–53 |
| 112 | August 7 | Marlins | 11–1 | Moyer (10–8) | VandenHurk (3–3) | Durbin (1) | 32,791 | 59–53 |
| 113 | August 8 | Marlins | 6–4 | Lohse (7–12) | Willis (7–12) | Myers (8) | 34,139 | 60–53 |
| 114 | August 9 | Marlins | 4–2 | Tankersley (5–1) | Myers (2–4) | Gregg (24) | 37,009 | 60–54 |
| 115 | August 10 | Braves | 5–4 | Hamels (13–5) | Moylan (4–2) | Gordon (6) | 40,844 | 61–54 |
| 116 | August 11 | Braves | 7–5 | Mahay (1–0) | Eaton (9–8) | Wickman (19) | 44,948 | 61–55 |
| 117 | August 12 | Braves | 5–3 | Moyer (11–8) | Carlyle (7–4) | Myers (9) | 45,053 | 62–55 |
| 118 | August 14 | @ Nationals | 3–2 | Alfonseca (4–1) | Rauch (8–3) | Myers (10) | 27,128 | 63–55 |
| 119 | August 15 | @ Nationals | 4–2 | Redding (2–3) | Kendrick (5–3) | Cordero (27) | 25,575 | 63–56 |
| 120 | August 16 | @ Nationals | 4–2 | Hamels (14–5) | Hanrahan (2–1) | Myers (11) | 27,308 | 64–56 |
| 121 | August 17 | @ Pirates | 11–8 | Durbin (5–2) | Gorzelanny (11–7) | | 37,072 | 65–56 |
| 122 | August 18 | @ Pirates | 11–6 | Maholm (9–14) | Moyer (11–9) | | 38,152 | 65–57 |
| 123 | August 19 | @ Pirates | 8–4 | Snell (8–10) | Romero (1–1) | | 31,277 | 65–58 |
| 124 | August 21 | Dodgers | 5–4 | Kendrick (6–3) | Tomko (2–11) | Myers (12) | 35,326 | 66–58 |
| 125 | August 22 | Dodgers | 15–3 | Lowe (10–11) | Durbin (5–3) | | 37,321 | 66–59 |
| 126 | August 23 | Dodgers | 5–2 | Billingsley (8–4) | Romero (1–2) | Saito (34) | 37,875 | 66–60 |
| 127 | August 24 | Padres | 14–3 | Maddux (10–9) | Moyer (11–10) | | 39,023 | 66–61 |
| 128 | August 25 | Padres | 4–3 | Bell (6–4) | Myers (2–5) | Hoffman (33) | 37,957 | 66–62 |
| 129 | August 26 | Padres | 14–2 | Kendrick (7–3) | Stauffer (0–1) | Ennis (1) | 39,362 | 67–62 |
| 130 | August 27 | Mets | 9–2 | Durbin (6–3) | Lawrence (1–2) | | 38,165 | 68–62 |
| 131 | August 28 | Mets | 4–2 (10) | Myers (3–5) | Mota (1–1) | | 40,508 | 69–62 |
| 132 | August 29 | Mets | 3–2 | Moyer (12–10) | Pérez (12–9) | Myers (13) | 43,150 | 70–62 |
| 133 | August 30 | Mets | 11–10 | Gordon (2–2) | Wagner (2–2) | | 42,552 | 71–62 |
| 134 | August 31 | @ Marlins | 9–2 | Kendrick (8–3) | Mitre (5–8) | | 15,231 | 72–62 |

September (17–11)

| # | Date | Opponent | Score | Win | Loss | Save | Attendance | Record |
|---|---|---|---|---|---|---|---|---|
| 135 | September 1 | @ Marlins | 12–6 | Kim (8–6) | Durbin (6–4) | Gregg (27) | 24,651 | 72–63 |
| 136 | September 2 | @ Marlins | 7–6 | Miller (5–0) | Davis (0–1) | Gregg (28) | 12,334 | 72–64 |
| 137 | September 3 | @ Braves | 5–1 | Cormier (2–4) | Moyer (12–11) | | 31,592 | 72–65 |
| 138 | September 4 | @ Braves | 5–2 | Lohse (8–12) | Carlyle (8–6) | Myers (14) | 22,130 | 73–65 |
| 139 | September 5 | @ Braves | 9–8 | Soriano (3–3) | Myers (3–6) | | 22,115 | 73–66 |
| 140 | September 7 | Marlins | 6–3 | Kim (9–6) | Durbin (6–5) | Gregg (29) | 38,696 | 73–67 |
| 141 | September 8 | Marlins | 9–1 | Condrey (5–0) | VandenHurk (4–6) | | 38,559 | 74–67 |
| 142 | September 9 | Marlins | 8–5 | Moyer (13–11) | Willis (8–15) | Myers (15) | 32,574 | 75–67 |
| 143 | September 10 | Rockies | 6–5 (10) | Myers (4–6) | Buchholz (6–5) | | 25,046 | 76–67 |
| 144 | September 11 | Rockies | 8–2 | Morales (1–2) | Eaton (9–9) | | 25,263 | 76–68 |
| 145 | September 12 | Rockies | 12–0 | Redman (1–4) | Kendrick (8–4) | | 31,541 | 76–69 |
| 146 | September 13 | Rockies | 12–4 | Geary (2–2) | Francis (15–8) | | 42,623 | 77–69 |
| 147 | September 14 | @ Mets | 3–2 (10) | Gordon (3–2) | Heilman (7–7) | Myers (16) | 53,730 | 78–69 |
| 148 | September 15 | @ Mets | 5–3 | Alfonseca (5–1) | Sosa (9–7) | Myers (17) | 55,477 | 79–69 |
| 149 | September 16 | @ Mets | 10–6 | Geary (3–2) | Mota (2–2) | | 52,779 | 80–69 |
| 150 | September 17 | @ Cardinals | 13–11 | Kendrick (9–4) | Thompson (6–6) | Rosario (1) | 42,031 | 81–69 |
| 151 | September 18 | @ Cardinals | 7–4 (14) | Mesa (2–3) | Maroth (5–7) | Condrey (1) | 42,170 | 82–69 |
| 152 | September 19 | @ Cardinals | 2–1 (10) | Flores (3–0) | Myers (4–7) | | 44,337 | 82–70 |
| 153 | September 20 | @ Nationals | 7–6 | Romero (2–2) | Albaladejo (1–1) | Myers (18) | 19,966 | 83–70 |
| 154 | September 21 | @ Nationals | 6–3 | Eaton (10–9) | Hill (4–5) | Myers (19) | 26,949 | 84–70 |
| 155 | September 22 | @ Nationals | 4–1 (10) | Myers (5–7) | Schroder (2–3) | Condrey (2) | 26,412 | 85–70 |
| 156 | September 23 | @ Nationals | 5–3 | Ayala (2–2) | Alfonseca (5–2) | Cordero (36) | 40,519 | 85–71 |
| 157 | September 25 | Braves | 10–6 | Bennett (2–0) | Moyer (13–12) | | 39,129 | 85–72 |
| 158 | September 26 | Braves | 5–2 | Lohse (9–12) | Hudson (16–10) | Myers (20) | 36,588 | 86–72 |
| 159 | September 27 | Braves | 6–4 | Kendrick (10–4) | Smoltz (14–8) | Myers (21) | 40,589 | 87–72 |
| 160 | September 28 | Nationals | 6–0 | Hamels (15–5) | Redding (3–6) | | 45,084 | 88–72 |
| 161 | September 29 | Nationals | 4–2 | Chico (7–9) | Eaton (10–10) | Cordero (37) | 44,532 | 88–73 |
| 162 | September 30 | Nationals | 6–1 | Moyer (14–12) | Bergmann (6–6) | | 44,865 | 89–73 |

== Player stats ==
=== Batting ===
Note: G = Games played; AB = At bats; R = Runs; H = Hits; 2B = Doubles; 3B = Triples; HR = Home runs; RBI = Runs batted in; SB = Stolen bases; BB = Walks; AVG = Batting average; SLG = Slugging average

| Player | G | AB | R | H | 2B | 3B | HR | RBI | SB | BB | AVG | SLG |
|---|---|---|---|---|---|---|---|---|---|---|---|---|
| Jimmy Rollins | 162 | 716 | 139 | 212 | 38 | 20 | 30 | 94 | 41 | 49 | .296 | .531 |
| Aaron Rowand | 161 | 612 | 105 | 189 | 45 | 0 | 27 | 89 | 6 | 47 | .309 | .515 |
| Chase Utley | 132 | 530 | 104 | 176 | 48 | 5 | 22 | 103 | 9 | 50 | .332 | .566 |
| Ryan Howard | 144 | 529 | 94 | 142 | 26 | 0 | 47 | 136 | 1 | 107 | .268 | .584 |
| Pat Burrell | 155 | 472 | 77 | 121 | 26 | 0 | 30 | 97 | 0 | 114 | .256 | .502 |
| Shane Victorino | 131 | 456 | 78 | 128 | 23 | 3 | 12 | 46 | 37 | 37 | .281 | .423 |
| Carlos Ruiz | 115 | 374 | 42 | 97 | 29 | 2 | 6 | 54 | 6 | 42 | .259 | .396 |
| Greg Dobbs | 142 | 324 | 45 | 88 | 20 | 4 | 10 | 55 | 3 | 29 | .272 | .451 |
| Wes Helms | 112 | 280 | 21 | 69 | 19 | 0 | 5 | 39 | 0 | 19 | .246 | .368 |
| Jayson Werth | 94 | 255 | 43 | 76 | 11 | 3 | 8 | 49 | 7 | 44 | .298 | .459 |
| Abraham Núñez | 136 | 252 | 24 | 59 | 10 | 1 | 0 | 16 | 2 | 30 | .234 | .282 |
| Tadahito Iguchi | 45 | 138 | 22 | 42 | 10 | 0 | 3 | 12 | 6 | 13 | .304 | .442 |
| Chris Coste | 48 | 129 | 15 | 36 | 3 | 0 | 5 | 22 | 0 | 4 | .279 | .419 |
| Rod Barajas | 48 | 122 | 16 | 28 | 8 | 0 | 4 | 10 | 0 | 21 | .230 | .393 |
| Michael Bourn | 105 | 119 | 29 | 33 | 3 | 3 | 1 | 6 | 18 | 13 | .277 | .378 |
| Chris Roberson | 28 | 28 | 6 | 8 | 0 | 0 | 0 | 1 | 2 | 1 | .286 | .286 |
| Pete Laforest | 14 | 11 | 2 | 1 | 0 | 0 | 0 | 1 | 0 | 2 | .091 | .091 |
| Russell Branyan | 7 | 9 | 2 | 2 | 0 | 0 | 2 | 5 | 0 | 0 | .222 | .889 |
| Pitcher totals | 162 | 332 | 28 | 51 | 7 | 0 | 1 | 15 | 0 | 19 | .154 | .184 |
| Team totals | 162 | 5688 | 892 | 1558 | 326 | 41 | 213 | 850 | 138 | 641 | .274 | .458 |

=== Pitching ===
Note: W = Wins; L = Losses; ERA = Earned run average; G = Games pitched; GS = Games started; SV = Saves; IP = Innings pitched; H = Hits allowed; R = Runs allowed; ER = Earned runs allowed; BB = Walks allowed; SO = Strikeouts

| Player | W | L | ERA | G | GS | SV | IP | H | R | ER | BB | SO |
|---|---|---|---|---|---|---|---|---|---|---|---|---|
| Jamie Moyer | 14 | 12 | 5.01 | 33 | 33 | 0 | 199.1 | 222 | 118 | 111 | 66 | 133 |
| Cole Hamels | 15 | 5 | 3.39 | 28 | 28 | 0 | 183.1 | 163 | 72 | 69 | 43 | 177 |
| Adam Eaton | 10 | 10 | 6.29 | 30 | 30 | 0 | 161.2 | 192 | 117 | 113 | 71 | 97 |
| Kyle Kendrick | 10 | 4 | 3.87 | 20 | 20 | 0 | 121.0 | 129 | 53 | 52 | 25 | 49 |
| Jon Lieber | 3 | 6 | 4.73 | 14 | 12 | 0 | 78.0 | 91 | 44 | 41 | 22 | 54 |
| Brett Myers | 5 | 7 | 4.33 | 51 | 3 | 21 | 68.2 | 61 | 33 | 33 | 27 | 83 |
| Geoff Geary | 3 | 2 | 4.41 | 57 | 0 | 0 | 67.1 | 72 | 44 | 33 | 25 | 38 |
| J.D. Durbin | 6 | 5 | 5.15 | 18 | 10 | 1 | 64.2 | 71 | 42 | 37 | 36 | 39 |
| Kyle Lohse | 3 | 0 | 4.72 | 13 | 11 | 0 | 61.0 | 64 | 33 | 32 | 24 | 42 |
| Freddy García | 1 | 5 | 5.90 | 11 | 11 | 0 | 58.0 | 74 | 39 | 38 | 19 | 50 |
| Ryan Madson | 2 | 2 | 3.05 | 38 | 0 | 1 | 56.0 | 48 | 19 | 19 | 23 | 43 |
| Clay Condrey | 5 | 0 | 5.04 | 39 | 0 | 2 | 50.1 | 61 | 30 | 28 | 16 | 27 |
| Antonio Alfonseca | 5 | 2 | 5.44 | 61 | 0 | 8 | 49.2 | 65 | 31 | 30 | 27 | 24 |
| Tom Gordon | 3 | 2 | 4.73 | 44 | 0 | 6 | 40.0 | 40 | 21 | 21 | 13 | 32 |
| José Mesa | 1 | 2 | 5.54 | 40 | 0 | 1 | 39.0 | 34 | 32 | 24 | 19 | 20 |
| J.C. Romero | 1 | 2 | 1.24 | 51 | 0 | 0 | 36.1 | 15 | 5 | 5 | 25 | 31 |
| Francisco Rosario | 0 | 3 | 5.47 | 23 | 0 | 1 | 26.1 | 34 | 16 | 16 | 13 | 25 |
| Mike Zagurski | 1 | 0 | 5.91 | 25 | 0 | 0 | 21.1 | 25 | 14 | 14 | 11 | 21 |
| Yoel Hernández | 0 | 0 | 5.28 | 14 | 0 | 0 | 15.1 | 20 | 9 | 9 | 1 | 13 |
| Brian Sanches | 1 | 1 | 5.52 | 12 | 0 | 0 | 14.2 | 13 | 11 | 9 | 12 | 9 |
| Fabio Castro | 0 | 0 | 6.00 | 10 | 1 | 0 | 12.0 | 9 | 8 | 8 | 13 | 14 |
| Kane Davis | 0 | 1 | 5.56 | 11 | 0 | 0 | 11.1 | 17 | 7 | 7 | 8 | 10 |
| John Ennis | 0 | 0 | 8.22 | 3 | 1 | 1 | 7.2 | 12 | 7 | 7 | 3 | 8 |
| Zach Segovia | 0 | 1 | 9.00 | 1 | 1 | 0 | 5.0 | 8 | 5 | 5 | 1 | 2 |
| Matt Smith | 0 | 0 | 11.25 | 9 | 0 | 0 | 4.0 | 4 | 5 | 5 | 11 | 1 |
| J.A. Happ | 0 | 1 | 11.25 | 1 | 1 | 0 | 4.0 | 7 | 5 | 5 | 2 | 5 |
| Joe Bisenius | 0 | 0 | 0.00 | 2 | 0 | 0 | 2.0 | 2 | 0 | 0 | 2 | 3 |
| Anderson García | 0 | 0 | 13.50 | 1 | 0 | 0 | 0.2 | 2 | 1 | 1 | 0 | 0 |
| Team totals | 89 | 73 | 4.73 | 162 | 162 | 42 | 1458.1 | 1555 | 821 | 767 | 558 | 1050 |

== Playoffs ==
=== NLDS ===
| Game | Score | Date | Starters | Time (ET) |
|---|---|---|---|---|
| 1 | Colorado Rockies 4, Philadelphia Phillies 2 | October 3 | Jeff Francis (1–0) vs. Cole Hamels (0–1) | 3:07 pm |
| 2 | Colorado Rockies 10, Philadelphia Phillies 5 | October 4 | Josh Fogg (1–0) vs. Kyle Kendrick (0–1) | 3:07 pm |
| 3 | Philadelphia Phillies 1, Colorado Rockies 2 | October 6 | Jamie Moyer vs. Ubaldo Jiménez | 9:37 pm |

== Awards ==
Jimmy Rollins won the Baseball Digest Player of the Year, the NL Most Valuable Player Award, the NLBM Oscar Charleston Legacy Award (NL MVP), the Philadelphia Sports Writers Association ("Outstanding Pro Athlete"), the John Wanamaker Athletic Award from the Philadelphia Sports Congress (summer 2008; for the 2007 calendar year), and the Pride of Philadelphia Award from the Philadelphia Sports Hall of Fame.

The NL Rawlings Gold Glove Award was won by Rollins (shortstop) and Aaron Rowand (outfield). The NL Silver Slugger Award was won by Chase Utley (second base) and Rollins (shortstop). Carlos Ruiz was named to the Topps All-Star Rookie team, at catcher.

The Philadelphia chapter of the Baseball Writers' Association of America (BBWAA) presented its annual franchise awards to Jimmy Rollins ("Mike Schmidt Most Valuable Player Award"), Cole Hamels ("Steve Carlton Most Valuable Pitcher Award"), Larry Shenk ("Dallas Green Special Achievement Award"), and Aaron Rowand ("Tug McGraw Good Guy Award").

The Philadelphia Sports Writers Association presented awards to broadcaster Harry Kalas ("Living Legend Award") and public-relations director Larry Shenk ("Lifetime Achievement Award").

== Farm system ==
| Level | Team | League | Manager |
|---|---|---|---|
| AAA | Ottawa Lynx | International League | John Russell |
| AA | Reading Phillies | Eastern League | P. J. Forbes |
| A | Clearwater Threshers | Florida State League | Dave Huppert |
| A | Lakewood BlueClaws | South Atlantic League | Steve Roadcap |
| A-Short Season | Williamsport Crosscutters | New York–Penn League | Greg Legg |
| Rookie | GCL Phillies | Gulf Coast League | Roly de Armas |

LEAGUE CHAMPIONS: Clearwater
