= Yoel Hernández =

Yoel Hernández may refer to:

- Yoel Hernández (hurdler) (born 1977), Cuban hurdler
- Yoel Hernández (baseball) (born 1980), Venezuelan baseball player
