= Brian Sanches =

American baseball player (born 1978)

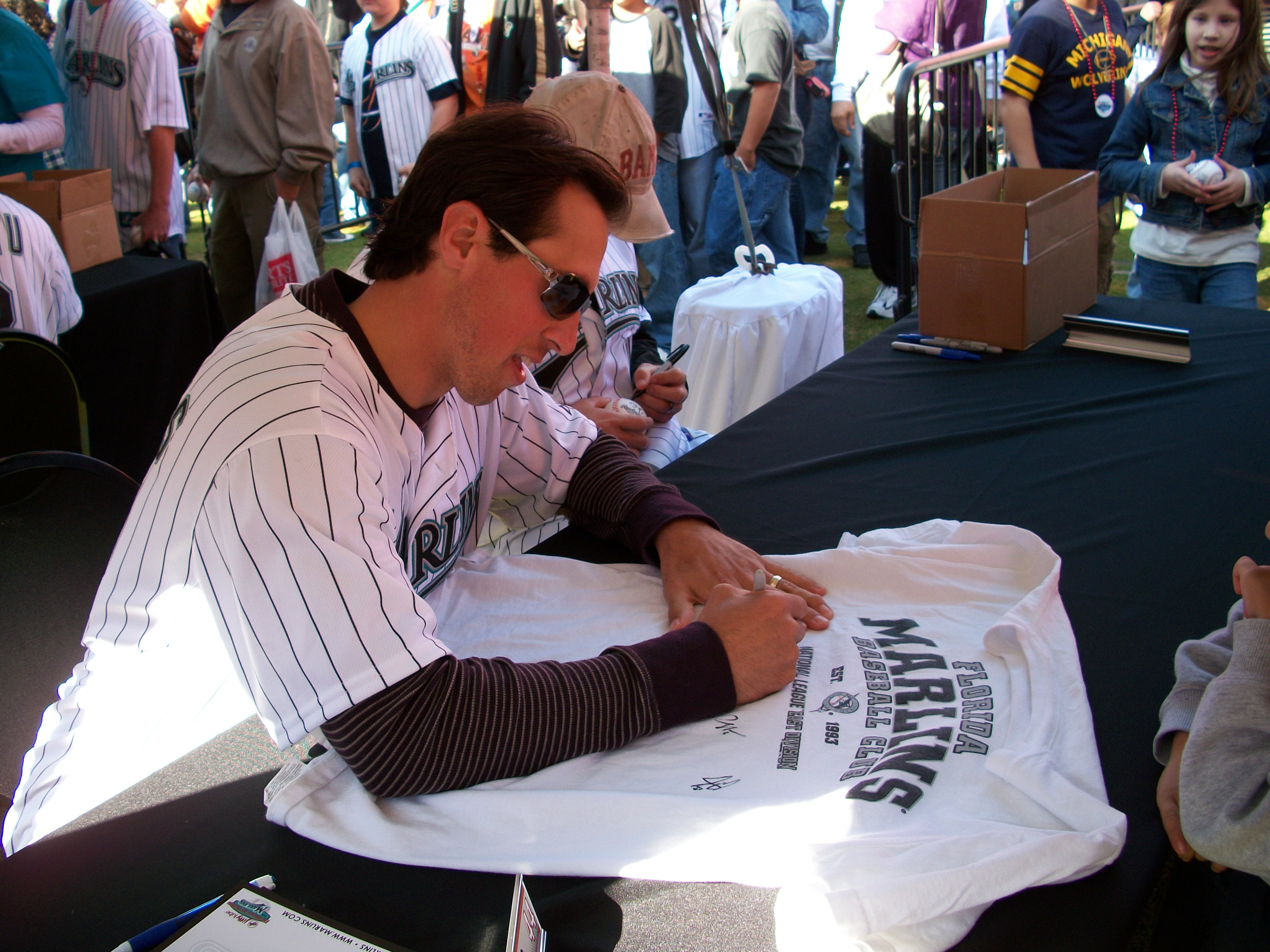
- Sanches with the Florida Marlins
- Pitcher
- Born: August 8, 1978 (age 47); Beaumont, Texas, U.S.
- Batted: Right Threw: Right

MLB debut
- June 1, 2006, for the Philadelphia Phillies

Last MLB appearance
- July 14, 2012, for the Philadelphia Phillies

MLB statistics
- Win–loss record: 13–7
- Earned run average: 3.75
- Strikeouts: 204
- Stats at Baseball Reference

Teams
- Philadelphia Phillies (2006–2007); Washington Nationals (2008); Florida Marlins (2009–2011); Philadelphia Phillies (2012)

Brian Lee Sanches (born August 8, 1978) is an American former professional baseball pitcher.

In 1996, Sanches graduated Nederland High School in Texas where he played baseball, basketball, football, and ran track. Sanches attended Lamar University in Texas where he played for the Lamar Cardinals Baseball team.

== Career ==
=== Kansas City Royals ===
He was first drafted by the Kansas City Royals as a 2nd round pick in the 1999 Major League Baseball draft and later signed with them on July 6, 1999. Sanches made his professional debut in 1999 with Single-A Spokane. While there, he struck out a career-high 11 batters in 6.0 innings pitched on August 27, 1999, versus Boise. He pitched a no-hitter on May 2, 2000, for the Single-A Wilmington Blue Rocks versus the Lynchburg Hillcats. Sanches spent the 2001 season with the Double-A Wichita Wranglers. While playing with Wichita during the 2002 season, he notched 10 wins. From July 1 to August 1, he won 4 consecutive decisions. In 2003, Sanches went 1–0 with an ERA of 1.83 with the Wranglers. Later that year, Brian (along with Chris Tierney) was traded to the San Diego Padres for Rondell White.

=== Philadelphia Phillies ===
Sanches was then traded to the Philadelphia Phillies in 2004. He pitched for Reading (Double-A) during 2004 while posting a 1.98 ERA. He earned Minor League Player of the Week honors from June 28 to July 4. Sanches was promoted on August 26 to Triple-A Scranton, where he finished the season. He pitched the entire 2005 season for Scranton while holding left-handers to a .212 average and allowing just one home run in his first 29.0 innings pitched. Sanches was a non-roster invitee to spring training. He began the season with Scranton, but finally made his major league debut on June 1, 2006, pitching 2.0 innings and giving up one walk and three strike-outs. Sanches was shuffled to and from the majors during the rest of the season. After Francisco Rosario was placed on the 15-day DL, Sanches was recalled from Ottawa on June 17, 2007.

=== Washington Nationals ===
He signed as a free agent with the Washington Nationals on December 21, 2007. He appeared in 12 games with the Nationals in 2008, with a 7.36 ERA.

=== Florida Marlins ===
In November 2008, he signed with the Florida Marlins. In three seasons with the Marlins, he pitched in 147 games with a 10–5 record and 2.92 ERA.

=== Second stint with the Philadelphia Phillies ===
He signed a minor league contract with the Philadelphia Phillies on November 30, 2011. After opening the 2012 season with the AAA Lehigh Valley IronPigs, he was placed on the Phillies' active roster on May 1 following the injury of reliever David Herndon. He posted a 0–1 record and 11.25 ERA in 3 games before returning to the IronPigs ten days later. On June 28, Sanches was called back up by the Phillies along with Jeremy Horst, to replace Chad Qualls, who was designated for assignment. He was outrighted to Triple-A on July 17. On July 31, Sanches was released by the organization.

=== Houston Astros ===
On August 2, 2012, Sanches made an agreement to join the Houston Astros organization with Triple-A Oklahoma City.

=== Return to Royals ===
The Kansas City Royals announced on November 16, 2012, that they had signed Sanches to a minor-league contract for 2013. No financial terms of the deal were revealed.

== Pitching style ==
Sanches relies mostly on four pitches. His primary pitch is a four-seam fastball in the upper 80s, which he uses for about half his pitches. Against left-handed hitters, he relies heavily on a forkball and somewhat less on a two-seam fastball to round out his repertoire. Against right-handed hitters, Sanches uses a slider as his main off-speed pitch, and he also throws the forkball to righties. On rare occasions, Sanches throws a mid-90s curveball.
