= Mike Zagurski =

American baseball player (born 1983)

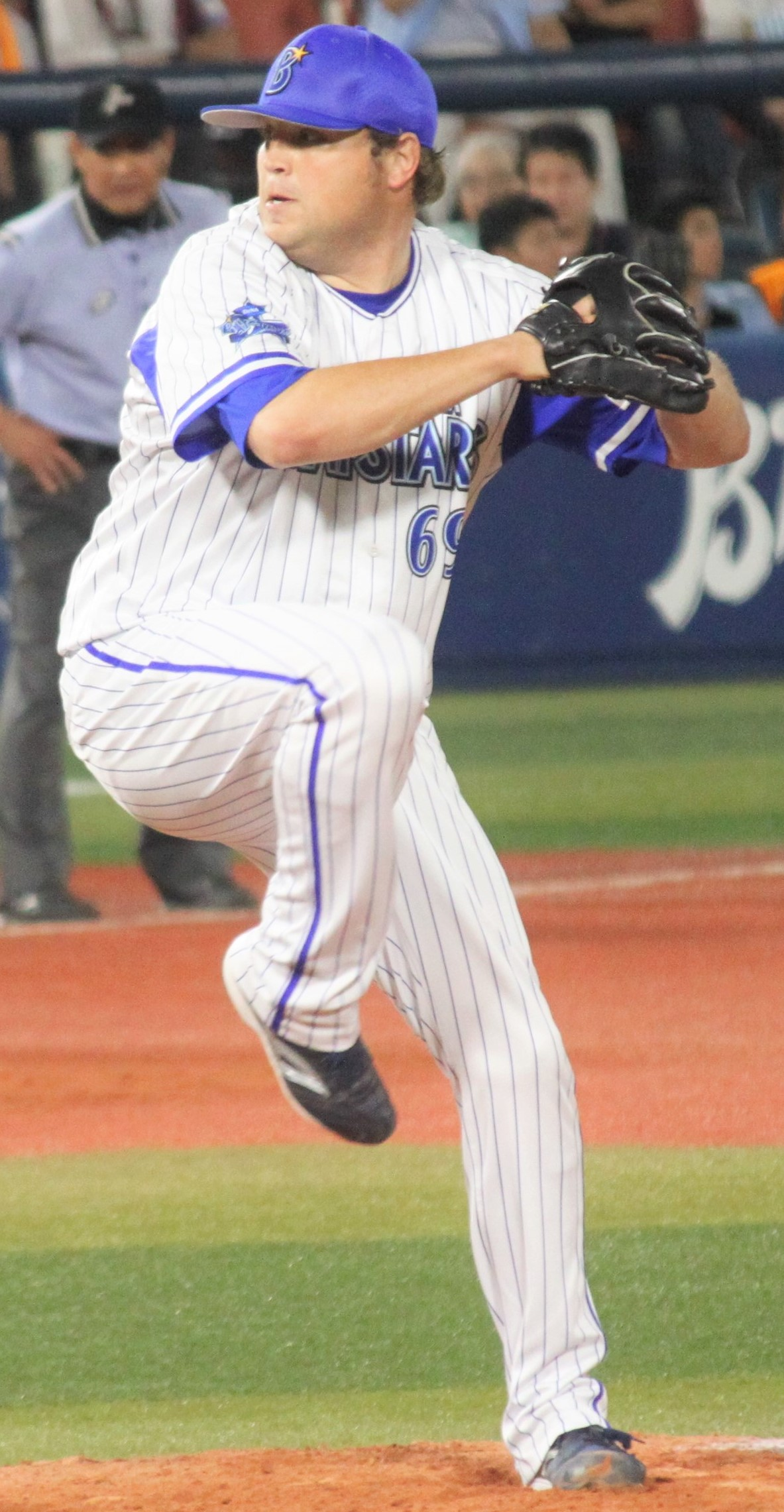
- Zagurski with the Yokohama DeNA BayStars
- Pitcher
- Born: January 27, 1983 (age 43); Omaha, Nebraska, U.S.
- Batted: Left Threw: Left

Professional debut
- MLB: May 25, 2007, for the Philadelphia Phillies
- NPB: March 27, 2015, for the Hiroshima Toyo Carp

Last appearance
- MLB: July 7, 2018, for the Milwaukee Brewers
- NPB: August 7, 2016, for the Yokohama DeNA BayStars

MLB statistics
- Win–loss record: 1–1
- Earned run average: 7.78
- Strikeouts: 77

NPB statistics
- Win–loss record: 3–1
- Earned run average: 4.15
- Strikeouts: 50
- Stats at Baseball Reference

Teams
- Philadelphia Phillies (2007, 2010–2011); Arizona Diamondbacks (2012); Pittsburgh Pirates (2013); New York Yankees (2013); Hiroshima Toyo Carp (2015); Yokohama DeNA BayStars (2016); Milwaukee Brewers (2018)

Michael Justin Zagurski (born January 27, 1983), is an American former professional baseball pitcher. He played in Major League Baseball (MLB) for the Philadelphia Phillies, Arizona Diamondbacks, Pittsburgh Pirates, and New York Yankees. Zagurski also played in Nippon Professional Baseball (NPB) for the Hiroshima Toyo Carp and Yokohama DeNA BayStars.

== Amateur career ==
Zagurski attended Millard North High School. Zagurski was neither drafted after high school nor recruited by any four-year colleges. He started his college career at Hutchinson Community College and finished at University of Kansas, where he set the single season record for strikeouts.

Zagurski played for the Anchorage Glacier Pilots of the Alaska Baseball League in 2004.

== Professional career ==
=== Philadelphia Phillies ===
Zagurski was drafted by the Philadelphia Phillies in the 12th round of the 2005 MLB draft. After two seasons in the low minors, he started the 2007 season with the Single-A Clearwater Threshers before being promoted to the Double-A Reading Phillies. On May 25, when Brett Myers was placed on the disabled list, Zagurski was placed on the Phillies major league roster. He made his first appearance that evening.

"The only thing I could say was, 'wow,'" he later told The Philadelphia Inquirer.

Almost 60 of the pitcher's friends, former teammates, and family were in attendance at Zagurski's first major league appearance at the Atlanta Braves' Turner Field. Legendary broadcaster Harry Kalas remarked on the cheers that greeted Zagurski's entry to the game and added that the 'Phillies might have themselves a left-hander' after Zagurski retired the first three batters he faced.

Zagurski walked New York Mets pinch hitter Julio Franco, who made his major league debut for the Phillies the year before Zagurski was born, and retired San Francisco Giants outfielder Barry Bonds less than two weeks after being called up. On the possibility of pitching to the potential future Hall of Famer, Zagurski had said, "Having an opportunity to face [Bonds] would be awesome. I'm sure I would notice him, but he's still trying to hit the ball and I'm still trying to get him out, so I think the star-strucking will stop"

On June 7, Zagurski won his first major league game as the Phillies completed a three-game sweep of the first-place New York Mets at Shea Stadium. Phillies color commentator Gary Matthews said Zagurski believed he had a place in the major leagues and that the young pitcher was "not at all in awe of being here." Phillies manager Charlie Manuel said after the game that Zagurski "has a future in the big leagues, and he definitely has a future with us."

On July 15, Zagurski pitched the entire ninth inning of the Phillies' 10,000th franchise loss. The game, which was carried nationally on ESPN's Sunday Night Baseball, saw the St. Louis Cardinals beat the Phillies 10–2.

On July 27, Myers was activated from the 15-day disabled list and the Phillies optioned Zagurski to the Triple-A Ottawa Lynx. On August 15, Zagurski was recalled to the majors when starter Adam Eaton was placed on the 15-day disabled list.

On April 3, 2008, Zagurski underwent season-ending Tommy John surgery and missed the entire 2008 season.

Zagurski started the 2010 season with the Lehigh Valley IronPigs, the Triple-A Affiliate of the Phillies, and was recalled to the major league club on June 22, 2010. He pitched 1 1/3 innings in his return, allowing one walk and one strikeout.

Zagurski was designated for assignment by the Phillies on September 16, 2011.

=== Arizona Diamondbacks ===
Zagurski was traded by the Phillies to the Arizona Diamondbacks on September 23, 2011, in exchange for a minor league pitcher. On April 4, 2012, Zagurski was out righted to the minors, removing him from the major league roster.

=== Pittsburgh Pirates ===
Zagurski signed a minor league contract with the Pittsburgh Pirates on December 1, 2012. He made six appearances for Pittsburgh in 2013, but struggled to a 15.00 ERA with five strikeouts over six innings of work. Zagurski was designated for assignment on June 14, 2013, to make room on the Pirates' roster for Brandon Cumpton. On June 18, he cleared waivers and was sent outright to the Triple-A Indianapolis Indians; however, he subsequently rejected the assignment and elected free agency the following day.

=== New York Yankees ===
On June 21, 2013, Zagurski signed a minor league contract with the New York Yankees organization. He made 20 appearances for the Triple-A Scranton/Wilkes-Barre RailRiders, registering a 5-3 record and 3.08 ERA with 38 strikeouts and one save across 26 1/3 innings pitched. Zagurski opted out of his contract on August 16.

=== Oakland Athletics ===
On August 18, 2013, Zagurski signed a minor league contract with the Oakland Athletics organization. He made six appearances for the Triple-A Sacramento River Cats, recording a 6.00 ERA with eight strikeouts over six innings of work. Zagurski was released by Oakland on September 2, after exercising the opt-out clause in his contract.

=== New York Yankees (second stint) ===
On September 10, 2013, Zagurski signed a major league contract with the New York Yankees. He made his Yankee debut two days later at Fenway Park against the Boston Red Sox, allowing two runs over 1/3 of an inning. On October 3, Zagurski was removed from the 40-man roster and sent outright to the Triple-A Scranton/Wilkes-Barre RailRiders; he subsequently rejected the assignment and elected free agency the next day.

=== Cleveland Indians ===
On November 21, 2013, Zagurski signed a minor league contract with the Cleveland Indians. Zagurski was assigned to the Triple-A Columbus Clippers, where he pitched to a 2-0 record and 2.76 ERA with 22 strikeouts over 16 games. He was released by the Indians organization on May 24, 2014.

=== Toronto Blue Jays ===
On May 27, 2014, Zagurski signed a minor league deal with the Toronto Blue Jays. He was added to the Triple-A Buffalo Bisons roster on May 30. On September 2, Zagurski asked for and was granted his release from the Blue Jays organization. He posted a 4–1 record with Buffalo, paired with a 2.08 ERA and 83 strikeouts in 60 2/3 innings.

=== Hiroshima Toyo Carp ===
On October 21, 2014, it was announced that Zagurski had signed a contract with the Hiroshima Toyo Carp of Nippon Professional Baseball. Zagurski pitched in 19 games for the Carp in 2015, recording no decisions, with 16 strikeouts in 15 innings pitched and a 2.40 ERA.

=== Yokohama DeNA BayStars ===
On April 5, 2016, Zagurski signed with the Yokohama DeNA BayStars of Nippon Professional Baseball. Zagurski appeared in 32 games for the BayStars in 2016. He posted a 3–1 record with a 4.96 ERA. He struck out 34 batters in 32 2/3 innings pitched.

=== Detroit Tigers ===
On February 5, 2017, Zagurski signed a minor league contract with the Detroit Tigers. He made 25 appearances split between the Double-A Erie SeaWolves and Triple-A Toledo Mud Hens, accumulating a 2-4 record and 3.29 ERA with 43 strikeouts across 27 1/3 innings pitched. Zagurski was released by the Tigers organization on June 15.

=== Milwaukee Brewers ===
On December 17, 2017, Zagurski signed a minor league contract with the Milwaukee Brewers. On June 28, 2018, the Brewers selected Zagurski's contract, adding him to their active roster. Two days later, Zagurski made his first Major League appearance since the 2013 season, earning his first career loss against the Cincinnati Reds. This set the MLB record for the longest time between a pitcher's first career win and loss at 11 years, 23 days. He struggled in two appearances for the club, allowing seven runs on five hits with two strikeouts in one inning of work. On July 8, Zagurski was designated for assignment by Milwaukee following the promotion of Corbin Burnes. He was assigned to the Triple-A Colorado Springs Sky Sox after clearing waivers, ultimately compiling a 3.20 ERA with 66 strikeouts in 49 appearances. Zagurski declared free agency on October 15.

=== Chicago Cubs ===
On December 19, 2018, Zagurski signed a minor league contract with the Chicago Cubs. He was released by Chicago prior to the start of the regular season on March 24, 2019.
