= Freddy García =

Venezuelan baseball player (born 1976)

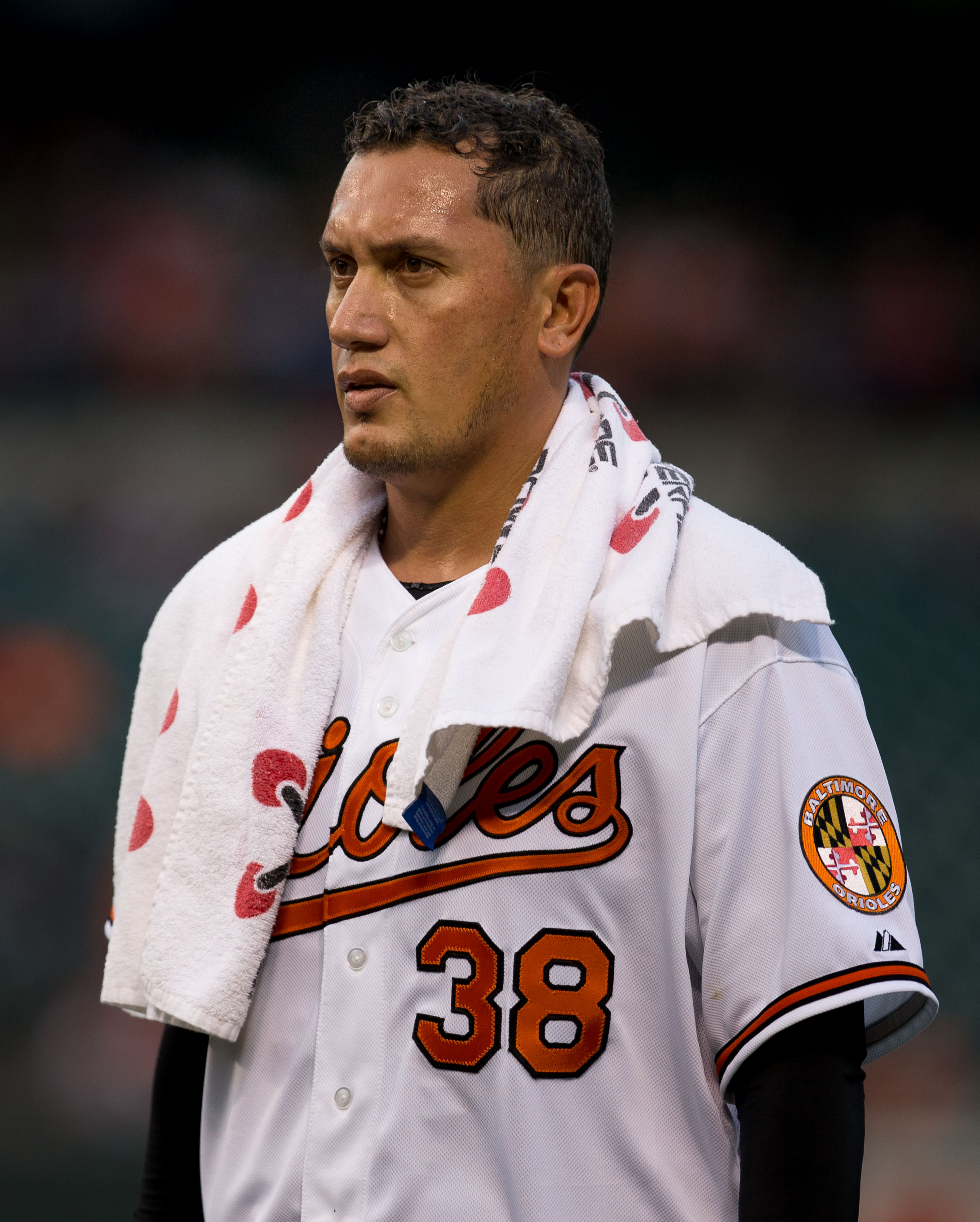
- Garcia with the Baltimore Orioles in 2013

Caliente de Durango
- Pitcher
- Born: October 6, 1976 (age 50); Caracas, Venezuela
- Batted: Right Threw: Right

MLB debut
- April 7, 1999, for the Seattle Mariners

Last MLB appearance
- September 24, 2013, for the Atlanta Braves

MLB statistics
- Win–loss record: 156–108
- Earned run average: 4.15
- Strikeouts: 1,621
- Stats at Baseball Reference

Teams
- Seattle Mariners (1999–2004); Chicago White Sox (2004–2006); Philadelphia Phillies (2007); Detroit Tigers (2008); Chicago White Sox (2009–2010); New York Yankees (2011–2012); Baltimore Orioles (2013); Atlanta Braves (2013)

Career highlights and awards
- 2× All-Star (2001, 2002); World Series champion (2005); AL ERA leader (2001)

Freddy Antonio García (born October 6, 1976) is a Venezuelan former professional baseball pitcher. He pitched for seven Major League Baseball (MLB) franchises, including the Seattle Mariners, Chicago White Sox, and New York Yankees. García has also pitched in the Chinese Professional Baseball League (CPBL), Mexican League, and Venezuelan Professional Baseball League. He currently serves as the pitching coach for Caliente de Durango of the Mexican League.

García's best year was in 2001 in which he led the American League in innings pitched and earned run average. He made the All-Star team in 2001 and 2002. He was a member of the 2005 World Series-winning White Sox and started the series-ending Game 4. He is the only pitcher to win a game in a World Series, All-Star Game, World Baseball Classic, and Caribbean Series.

== Professional career ==
=== Seattle Mariners ===
Originally signed by the Houston Astros as an international free agent in 1993, García was acquired by Seattle in 1998, along with Carlos Guillén and John Halama in the trade that sent Randy Johnson to the Astros.

During García's rookie season in 1999, he pitched 201 innings, with a 17–8 record, 170 strikeouts, and a 4.07 earned run average (ERA) in 33 starts. After going 9–5 in his second season, he went on to compile a 45–42 record over the course of the next three and a half seasons with Seattle. His strongest season was in 2001, when he earned 18 of the Mariners' American League (AL) record-setting 116 wins and led the league with 238 2/3 innings pitched and a 3.05 earned run average. He finished third in AL Cy Young Award voting that year. He was selected to the All-Star Game in both 2001 and 2002.

As a Mariner, García had a 76–50 record with a 3.89 ERA and 819 strikeouts.

=== Chicago White Sox ===
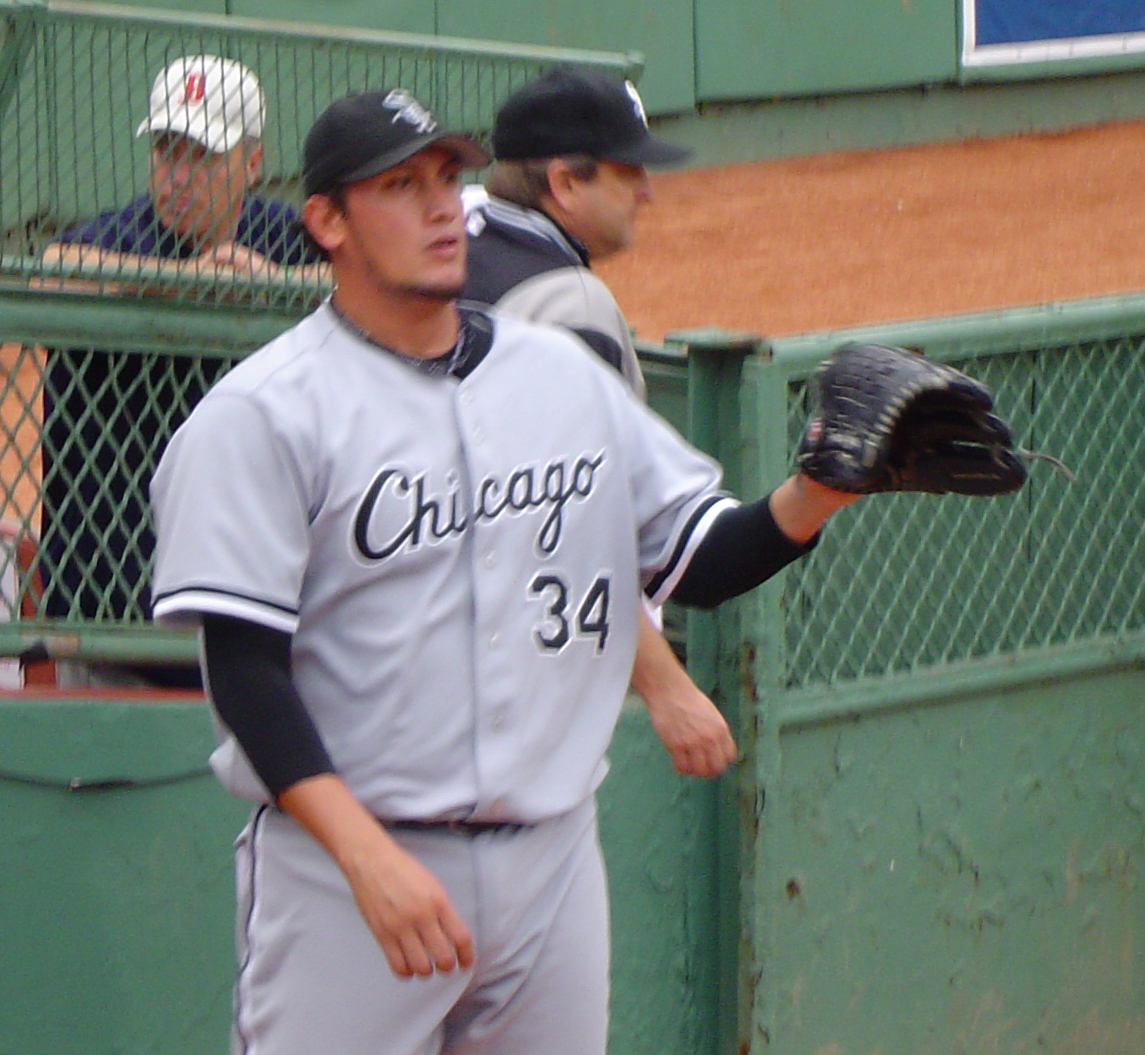
García with the Chicago White Sox in 2005

On June 27, 2004, García and catcher Ben Davis were traded to the Chicago White Sox for Michael Morse, Miguel Olivo, and Jeremy Reed. García was the starting pitcher in Game 4 of the 2005 World Series for the White Sox, pitching seven scoreless innings against the Houston Astros. The White Sox won the game and the World Series, completing a four-game sweep.

In 2006, García surpassed 1,000 strikeouts for his career. In eight post-season games, he was 5–2 with a 3.56 ERA in 48 innings. Also during 2006, on April 29, García recorded his 103rd career win in a game against the Los Angeles Angels of Anaheim, surpassing former White Sox left-hander Wilson Álvarez as the Venezuelan native with the most career wins in major league history. He finished the season 17–9 with a 4.53 ERA. He was given the nickname "Big Game" while a member of the White Sox.

=== Philadelphia Phillies ===
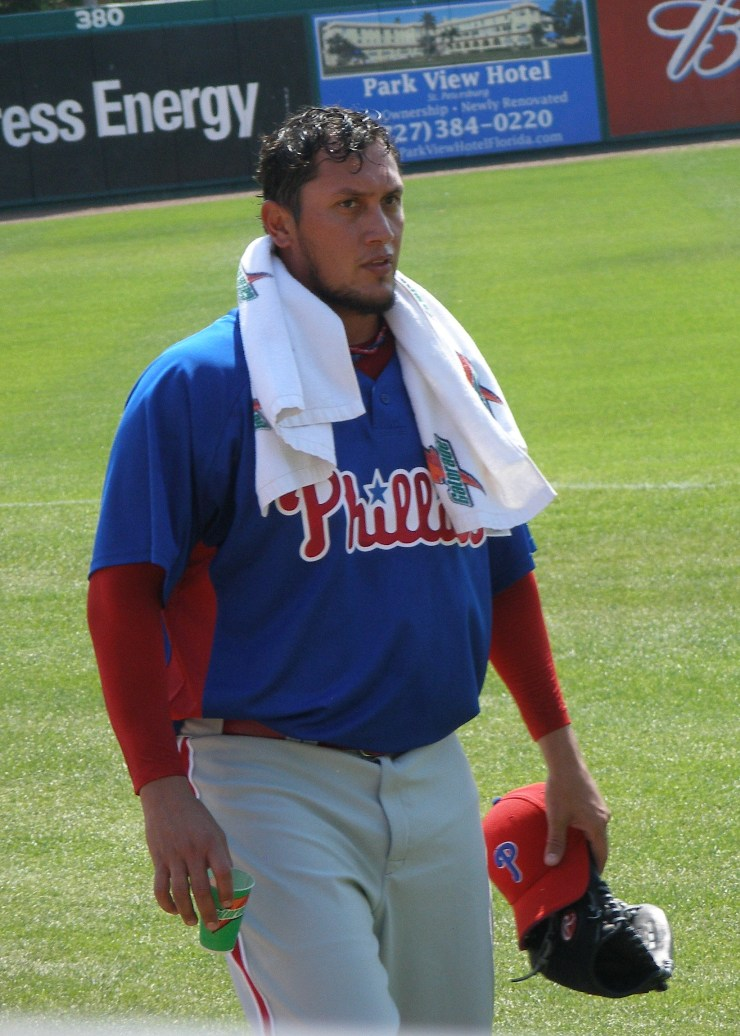
García with the Philadelphia Phillies in 2007

In December 2006, García was traded to the Philadelphia Phillies for prospects Gavin Floyd and Gio González.

García experienced a shoulder injury that limited his performance for the first several months of the season. He was placed on the disabled list (DL) in June, and had shoulder surgery in August. García made 11 starts before being placed on the DL and earned one win.

=== Detroit Tigers ===
In August 2008, García signed a minor league contract with the Detroit Tigers. In his first two minor league starts with the Tigers, he pitched five innings, gave up no runs, and struck out five. In his Tigers debut in late September, García, with a limited pitch count, threw five scoreless innings to get the win.

=== New York Mets ===
In January 2009, García agreed to a minor league deal with the New York Mets. He was released on April 28, 2009, after two bad starts for the Buffalo Bisons.

=== Chicago White Sox (second stint) ===
On June 8, 2009, García signed a minor league contract with the White Sox. García started on August 18 against the Kansas City Royals for the first time with the White Sox since 2006. In his first game back with Chicago, García went 4 1/3 innings allowing five earned runs in a losing effort. He finished the season with a 3–4 record and a 4.34 ERA.

On October 5, the White Sox exercised their 2010 option on García, a $1 million base salary with $2 million in possible incentives. He became a free agent following the 2010 season.

=== New York Yankees ===
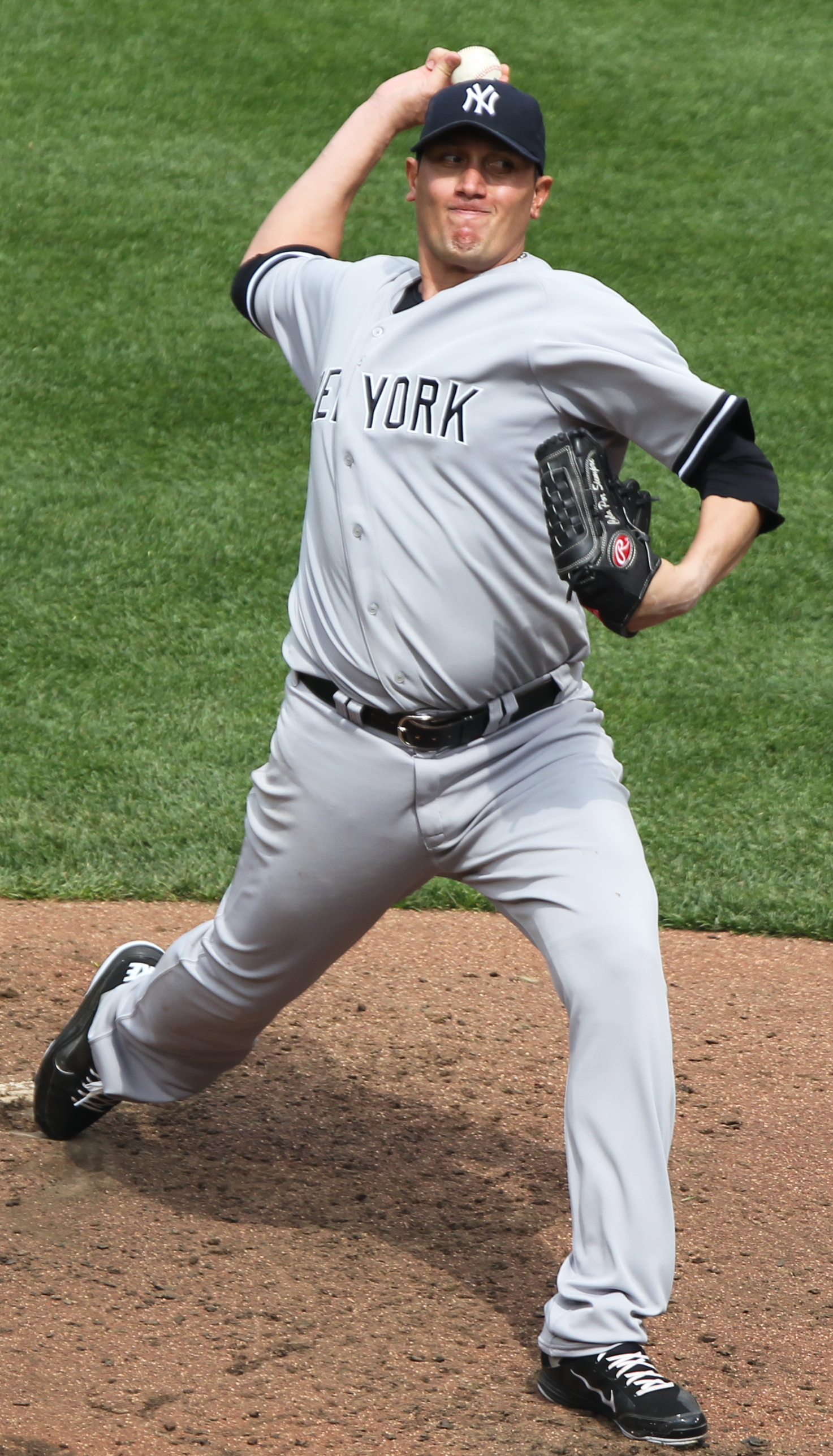
García pitching for the New York Yankees in 2011

On January 31, 2011, García agreed to a minor league contract with the New York Yankees worth $1.5 million. On March 25, the Yankees announced that García would be in the Yankees' starting rotation. He finished the season with a solid 12–8 record and a 3.62 ERA, however, he was consistently hammered by teams with winning records, most notably the Boston Red Sox. García was on the mound in relief as the Sox won their second game of the season on April 10, as well as two other losses on May 15 and June 7. However, García defeated the Red Sox on September 24.

García also lost his only playoff start in Game 2 as the Yankees were defeated by the Detroit Tigers in the AL Division Series in five games. Despite this, the Yankees offered him a one-year deal worth $4 million with incentives for the 2012 season. The deal became official on December 9.

In 2012, García was expected to challenge for a starting spot with Phil Hughes, A. J. Burnett, Andy Pettitte and Michael Pineda. However, Burnett was traded in the offseason, and Pineda was diagnosed with a shoulder injury, thereby allowing García into the rotation. García began the season with bad footing as he threw five wild pitches in his first start against the Baltimore Orioles. He was demoted to the bullpen after going 0–2 in April with a 12.51 ERA, averaging only 3.1 innings per start. David Phelps was moved into the starting rotation.

García immediately improved once in the bullpen. In his two-month relief stint, he posted a 1.56 ERA in 17.1 innings. His sinker's speed also improved, from an average of 87.1 mph in April to 88.6 in May/June.

A fibula injury to Pettitte in late June brought García back into the rotation. Overall, García finished the 2012 season with a 7–6 record and a 5.20 ERA in 30 games appeared (17 started). He became a free agent following the season.

=== Baltimore Orioles ===
On January 28, 2013, García signed a minor league deal with the San Diego Padres. He was released by the Padres on March 24. He promptly signed a minor league contract with the Baltimore Orioles and joined the Triple-A Norfolk Tides. He was called up on May 4 to make his Orioles debut on the road at Anaheim. He was designated for assignment on June 24. Three days later, García signed another minor league contract and returned to Norfolk.

=== Atlanta Braves ===
On August 23, 2013, the Orioles traded García to the Atlanta Braves for cash considerations. He had his contract selected to the major league roster on September 1. García pitched effectively for the Braves, going 1–2 with a 1.65 ERA in September (1–1, 1.83 ERA in 3 starts). He started Game 4 of the NLDS. Although the Braves lost to the Los Angeles Dodgers, García pitched well, giving up two runs over six innings and was in line for the win when he left the game. The 2014 postseason was his last appearance in the majors.

He returned to the Braves on a minor league contract signed January 24, 2014. He was released on March 24.

=== EDA Rhinos ===
On April 18, 2014, García signed with the EDA Rhinos of the Chinese Professional Baseball League (CPBL). The seven-month deal included incentives that increased its value up to $392,000 and was the most lucrative in CPBL history until Lin Chih-sheng signed a three-year deal for $1.36 million in January 2016. In his first game for the Rhinos on May 10, García pitched six innings of shutout ball on four hits in a no-decision before being pulled after 77 pitches. The Rhinos won the game 5–0 against the Chinatrust Brother Elephants in front of a sellout crowd of more than 12,000. García went 11–9 for the Rhinos with a 3.19 ERA in 161 innings pitched.

=== Olmecas de Tabasco/Los Angeles Dodgers ===
On February 25, 2015, García signed with the Olmecas de Tabasco of the Mexican League. However, on April 9, García signed a minor league contract with the Los Angeles Dodgers. He was assigned to the Triple-A Oklahoma City Dodgers. He appeared in four games and made one start for Oklahoma City, allowing seven runs in 7 1/3 innings and was released on April 21.

García rejoined the Olmecas in June. With Tabasco, he made 6 starts, throwing 33 1/3 innings, going 1–2 with a 5.67 ERA and 21 strikeouts.

=== Sultanes de Monterrey ===
Olmecas traded García to the Sultanes de Monterrey in July 2015. In September, he joined the Tigres de Aragua. He spent the rest of 2015 with Aragua, where he won a league championship, and started the first and final games of the 2016 Caribbean Series. He announced his retirement after the series concluded. In 5 starts (35 1/3 innings), he went 3–1 with a 2.55 ERA and 23 strikeouts with Aragua.

On April 8, 2016, García came out of retirement and re-signed with the Monterrey. He was released on May 3. In five starts (23 1/3 innings) he went 2–0 with a 5.01 ERA and 14 strikeouts.

=== Leones de Yucatán ===
On March 5, 2018, García signed with the Leones de Yucatán of the Mexican League. He was released on April 23. He made 5 starts, throwing 23 2/3 innings going 2–2 with a 5.32 ERA and 22 strikeouts.

== International career ==
García pitched for the Venezuela national team in the 2006 World Baseball Classic. In two starts, he went 1–0 with a 1.23 ERA in 7 1/3 innings pitched. He was subject to International Baseball Federation drug testing and tested positive for cannabis.

García coached the Palestine national team in the Baseball United Arab Classic in 2024 and 2025 Asian Baseball Championship.

== Player profile ==
García threw a fastball that topped out in the 90s in his prime and a hard slider. He also threw a two-seam fastball, a curveball, a split-finger fastball and occasionally used a changeup.

García was a power pitcher early in his career, but as he got older, he lost velocity on his pitches and compensated by developing a broad repertoire of up to six or seven pitches. In his final MLB season in 2013, García's fastball topped out at 90 miles per hour.

García also adjusted his approach to the strike zone, being especially careful not to leave pitches in the middle of the plate: "He doesn't really have the electric stuff, so he's going to stay on the corners and stay out of the zone."

García is the first pitcher to win a game in a World Series, All-Star Game, World Baseball Classic (WBC), and Caribbean Series. He won Game 4 of the 2005 World Series, won the 2001 All-Star Game, won a WBC game in 2006, and won Caribbean Series games in 2016.

Upon his retirement, García led all Venezuelan MLB pitchers in wins, starts, and innings pitched, records since surpassed by fellow Mariner Félix Hernández.

García was on the 2019 Baseball Hall of Fame ballot, but received no votes and became ineligible for the 2020 ballot.

García was named one of the 50 greatest Mariners players in 2026.

== Personal life ==
García and his wife married in 2004. They have two children.

== See also ==
- List of Major League Baseball players from Venezuela
