= Anderson García =

Dominican baseball player (born 1981)

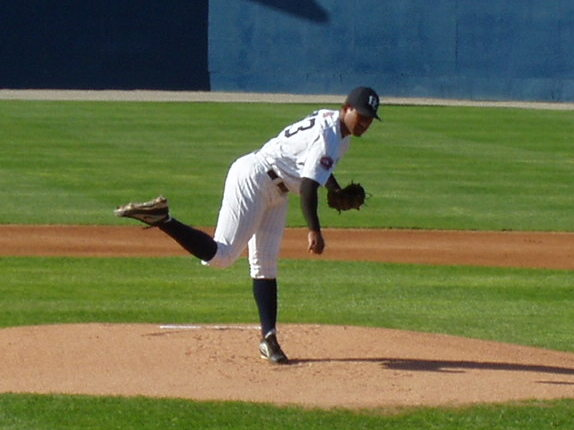
- García with the Battle Creek Yankees in 2003
- Relief pitcher
- Born: March 23, 1981 (age 45); Santo Domingo, Dominican Republic
- Batted: Right Threw: Right

MLB debut
- July 7, 2007, for the Philadelphia Phillies

Last MLB appearance
- July 7, 2007, for the Philadelphia Phillies

MLB statistics
- Win–loss record: 0–0
- Earned run average: 13.50
- Strikeouts: 0
- Stats at Baseball Reference

Teams
- Philadelphia Phillies (2007)

Anderson Garcia (born March 23, 1981) is a Dominican former professional baseball relief pitcher, who played one game in Major League Baseball (MLB) for the 2007 Philadelphia Phillies.

== Career ==
Garcia was signed as a non-drafted free agent by the New York Yankees in May 2001. In July 2003, he was traded along with pitchers Jason Anderson and Ryan Bicondoa to the New York Mets for closer Armando Benítez. Though primarily a starting pitcher while in the Yankees organization, the Mets organization used him almost exclusively as a reliever. Garcia was promoted to the Mets roster in May 2006, but was quickly sent back to Norfolk and never actually appeared in a game for the team. In August 2006, he was placed on waivers by the Mets and claimed by the Baltimore Orioles. He was subsequently claimed by the Philadelphia Phillies in December.

In February 2008, the Seattle Mariners claimed Garcia on waivers from the Phillies. Garcia was released on July 9, 2008.
