= Fabio Castro =

Dominican baseball player (born 1985)

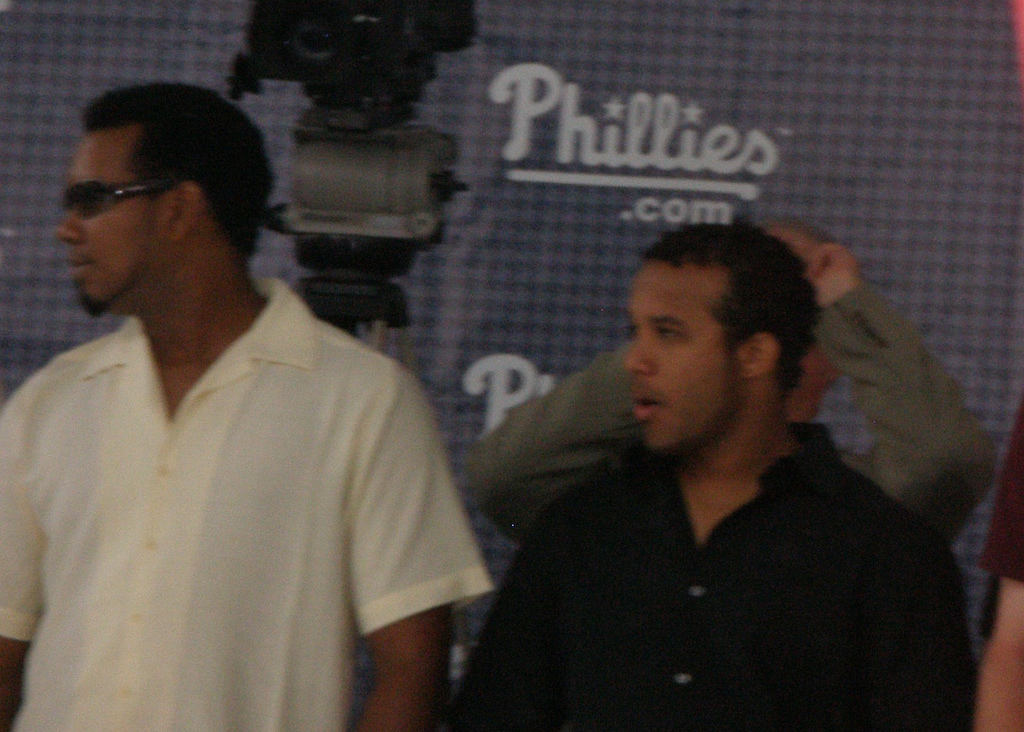
- Francisco Rosario (left) and Castro in 2007
- Pitcher
- Born: January 20, 1985 (age 41); Monte Cristi, Dominican Republic
- Batted: Left Threw: Left

MLB debut
- April 6, 2006, for the Texas Rangers

Last MLB appearance
- September 17, 2007, for the Philadelphia Phillies

MLB statistics
- Win–loss record: 0–1
- Earned run average: 3.30
- Strikeouts: 32
- Stats at Baseball Reference

Teams
- Texas Rangers (2006); Philadelphia Phillies (2006–2007)
Medals
Representing Dominican Republic
Men's Baseball
Central American and Caribbean Games
Bronze medal – third place	2002 San Salvador	Team
Intercontinental Cup
Bronze medal – third place	2002 Havana	Team

Fabio Enrique Castro (born January 20, 1985) is a Dominican former professional baseball pitcher, who played in Major League Baseball (MLB) for the Texas Rangers and Philadelphia Phillies, from 2006 to 2007.

== Career ==
=== Chicago White Sox ===
He was originally signed by the Chicago White Sox as an amateur free agent on December 26, 2001. He played in the White Sox farm system through 2005, with stops with the Bristol White Sox, Kannapolis Intimidators, and Winston-Salem Warthogs, reaching as high as Single-A.

=== Texas Rangers ===
Castro was the first pick in the 2005 Rule 5 draft by the Kansas City Royals on December 8, 2005. He was then traded to the Texas Rangers for second baseman Esteban Germán. Castro made his major league debut on April 6, 2006, for the Rangers against the Detroit Tigers, pitching 3 2/3 innings and allowing one earned run. He appeared in 4 games for the Rangers, and had an ERA of 4.32 in 8 1/3 innings pitched.

=== Philadelphia Phillies ===
Castro was traded to the Philadelphia Phillies on June 29, 2006, in exchange for Daniel Haigwood. He pitched in 16 games for the Phillies during the remainder of the season, recording a 1.54 ERA.

In 2007, Castro made 10 appearances for the Phillies, including making his first career Major League start, on August 23 against the Los Angeles Dodgers. He had a 6.00 ERA that season for the club, while also pitching in 11 games for the Double-A Reading Phillies and 21 games for the Triple-A Ottawa Lynx.

=== Toronto Blue Jays ===
Castro was traded to the Toronto Blue Jays on September 29, 2008, to complete a trade for Matt Stairs. With the Blue Jays organization, he spent the season with the Triple-A Las Vegas 51s, compiling a 7–6 record and 4.49 ERA in 25 starts.

=== Boston Red Sox ===
Castro signed a minor league contract with the Boston Red Sox on December 7, 2009. He spent the season with the Triple-A Pawtucket Red Sox, where he was 7–9 with a 4.93 ERA in 31 appearances (15 starts).

Castro was designated for assignment on June 29, 2010, to clear roster space for recently acquired Eric Patterson.

=== Seattle Mariners ===
On November 22, 2010, Castro signed a minor league contract with the Seattle Mariners organization. He spent that season with the Tacoma Rainiers, where he was 5–4 with a 3.63 ER in 24 appearances (12 starts).

=== Oakland Athletics ===
On January 6, 2012, Castro signed a minor league contract with the Oakland Athletics organization. He finished the season with a 5.60 ERA, while pitching for the Double-A Midland RockHounds and Triple-A Sacramento River Cats.

=== Los Angeles Dodgers ===
On November 23, 2012, Castro was reported to sign a minor league contract with the San Francisco Giants. However, that report was in error, as he was subsequently signed by the Los Angeles Dodgers to a minor league contract on December 19. The Dodgers released him in March 2013.

=== Tigres de Quintana Roo ===
On May 20, 2013, Castro signed with the Tigres de Quintana Roo of the Mexican League. He became a free agent after the 2014 season.

=== Saraperos de Saltillo ===
On April 3, 2015, Castro signed with the Saraperos de Saltillo of the Mexican League. He was released by the Saraperos on April 13.

=== Toros de Tijuana ===
On July 7, 2015, Castro signed with the Toros de Tijuana of the Mexican League. He was released by Tijuana on January 20, 2016.
