= J. D. Durbin =

American baseball player (born 1982)

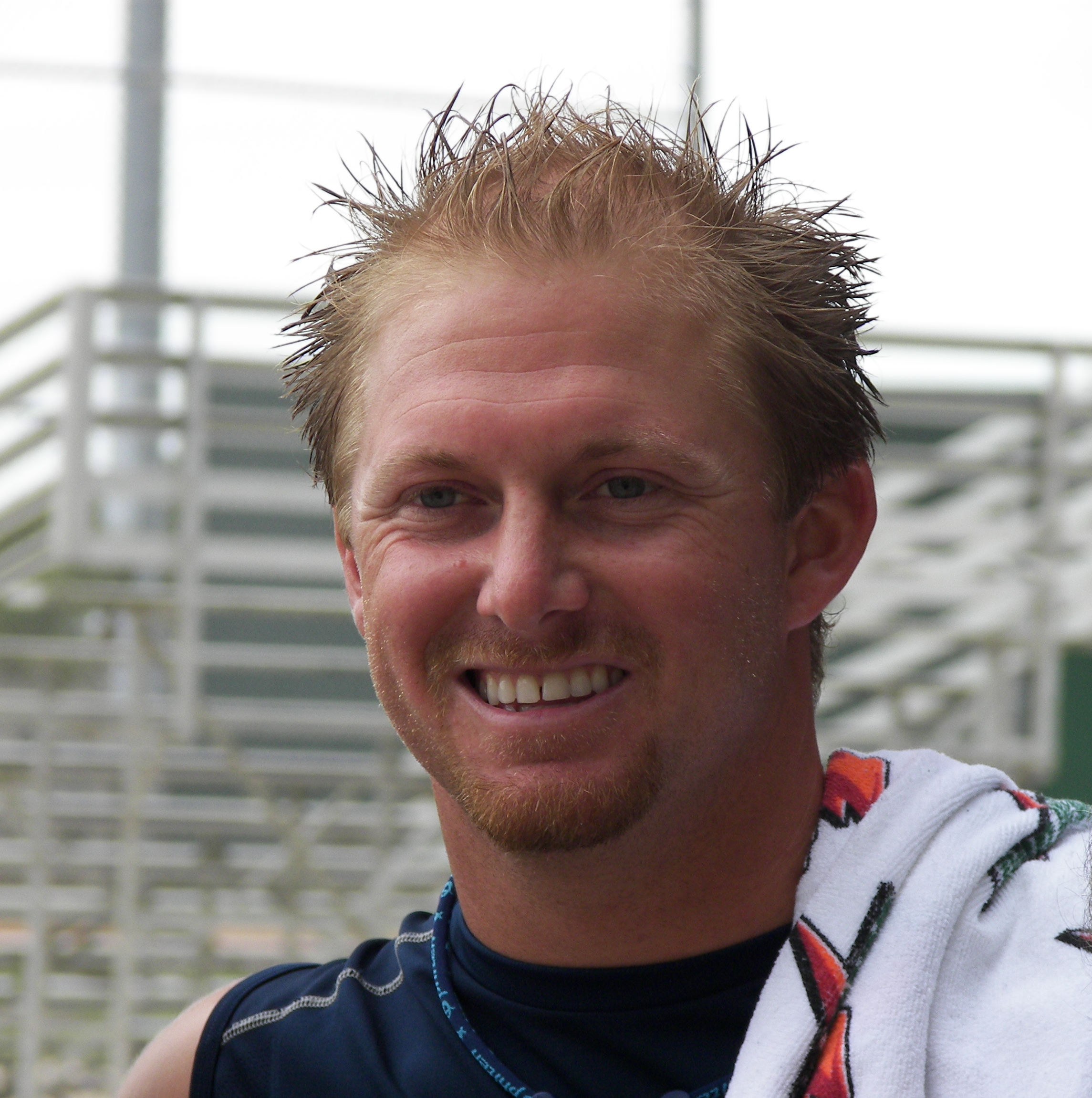
- Pitcher
- Born: February 24, 1982 (age 44); Portland, Oregon, U.S.
- Batted: Right Threw: Right

Professional debut
- MLB: September 8, 2004, for the Minnesota Twins
- NPB: June 25, 2010, for the Fukuoka SoftBank Hawks
- CPBL: May 28, 2013, for the Lamigo Monkeys

Last appearance
- MLB: September 20, 2007, for the Philadelphia Phillies
- NPB: July 8, 2010, for the Fukuoka SoftBank Hawks
- CPBL: August 29, 2013, for the Lamigo Monkeys

MLB statistics
- Win–loss record: 6–6
- Earned run average: 6.19
- Strikeouts: 46

NPB statistics
- Win-loss record: 0-2
- Earned run average: 6.75
- Strikeouts: 11

CPBL statistics
- Win-loss record: 5-2
- Earned run average: 2.89
- Strikeouts: 22
- Saves: 8
- Stats at Baseball Reference

Teams
- Minnesota Twins (2004); Arizona Diamondbacks (2007); Philadelphia Phillies (2007); Fukuoka SoftBank Hawks (2010); Lamigo Monkeys (2013)

Joseph Adam "J. D." Durbin (born February 24, 1982), is an American former professional baseball pitcher who played in Major League Baseball (MLB) for the Minnesota Twins, Arizona Diamondbacks, and the Philadelphia Phillies, in Nippon Professional Baseball (NPB) for the Fukuoka SoftBank Hawks, and in the Chinese Professional Baseball League (CPBL) for the Lamigo Monkeys.

== Career ==
=== "The Real Deal" ===
Durbin was drafted by the Minnesota Twins in 2000 in the second round (54th overall) out of Coronado High School in Arizona where he played baseball and football. Durbin, whose self-appointed/coach aided nickname, (thanks to Al Newman), at one time was "the Real Deal", was the Twins Minor League Player of the Year in 2002 after compiling an 13–4 record with 163 strikeouts for the Quad City River Bandits of the Midwest League. The following season, he was the starting pitcher in the Florida State League all-star game, and pitched in the All-Star Futures Game.

=== MLB debut ===
Durbin made his MLB debut on September 8, 2004, pitching in relief, and made his first career start on September 23 against the Cleveland Indians. In three innings pitched, he gave up seven hits and five earned runs and took his only loss for the season.

Durbin was ranked the #70th best prospect by "Baseball America" in 2005 and the Twins second best pitcher behind Jesse Crain. However, he did not play in the majors during the 2005 and 2006 seasons. He had gone 4–3 with an 2.33 ERA in 16 starts for Triple-A Rochester before being sidelined for the rest of the 2006 season on July 5 with right biceps musculocutaneous neuropathy.

=== Philadelphia Phillies ===
Durbin, who was cleared to start throwing on February 1, 2007, did not fare well coming off his injury. During spring training in 2007, he went 0–2 with an 11.25 ERA in seven relief appearances for the Twins and was claimed off waivers by the Arizona Diamondbacks on March 29. He appeared in one game for the D-Backs out of the bullpen on April 4 against the Colorado Rockies, and gave up seven runs in 2/3 of an inning. The following day he was designated for assignment. He was claimed off waivers by the Boston Red Sox on April 10, and designated for assignment on the very same day. The Philadelphia Phillies then claimed Durbin from the Red Sox on April 13. He would be designated for assignment on April 17 and was out-righted to Triple-A Ottawa the next day.

Durbin was called back up to the majors, and made his first start for the Phillies against the New York Mets on June 29. In 4 2/3 innings, he gave up all six runs in the Mets' 6–5 victory. He earned his first major league win on July 17, 2007, against the Los Angeles Dodgers where he pitched six innings and gave up one run. He also got his first three major league hits in the same game. In his next start on July 22, 2007, he pitched his first major league complete game shutout against the San Diego Padres throwing 109 pitches, with 71 for strikes against 38 balls.

Durbin failed to make the club in spring training 2008, and on March 18, the Phillies out-righted Durbin to the minors. He split the season between the Double-A Reading Phillies and the Triple-A Lehigh Valley IronPigs, going 5–14 with an 5.82 ERA. He became a free agent following the season.

=== Los Angeles Dodgers ===
On May 6, 2009, Durbin signed a minor league contract with the Los Angeles Dodgers. He made his debut with the Southern League Chattanooga Lookouts on May 4, pitching three scoreless innings in relief. His first start came on May 23, against the Carolina Mudcats. He was solid, giving up only one earned run on three hits and one walk in four innings, yet he took the loss. On July 17, he was promoted to the Triple-a Albuquerque Isotopes, with whom he went 0–6 with an 6.43 ERA. He elected free agency following the season on November 6.

=== Fukuoka SoftBank Hawks ===
On May 2, 2010, Durbin signed with the Fukuoka SoftBank Hawks of Nippon Professional Baseball. He became a free agent following the season.

=== Olmecas de Tabasco ===
On May 24, 2011, Durbin signed with the Olmecas de Tabasco of the Mexican League. He was released on June 30. In 4 games (3 starts) 12.1 innings he struggled horrendously going 0-2 with a 13.86 ERA and 9 strikeouts.

=== Lancaster Barnstormers ===
On June 18, 2011, Durbin signed with the Lancaster Barnstormers of the Atlantic League of Professional Baseball. In 18 games (17 starts) 106.2 innings he went 8-4 with a 5.06 ERA with 81 strikeouts.

On March 29, 2012, Durbin re-signed with the Barnstormers for the 2012 season. He became a free agent following the season. In 28 starts 181 innings he went 14-9 with a 4.48 ERA with 116 strikeouts while throwing 6 complete games and 1 shutout.

=== Boston Red Sox ===
On January 5, 2013, Durbin signed a minor league contract with the Boston Red Sox. He was released on April 27.

=== Lamigo Monkeys ===
On May 27, 2013, Durbin signed with the Lamigo Monkeys of the Chinese Professional Baseball League. He became a free agent following the season.

=== Leones de Yucatán ===
On May 21, 2014, Durbin signed with the Leones de Yucatán of the Mexican League. He was released on June 9. In 3 games (1 start) he struggled horrifically across 2 innings of work going 0-2 with a 58.50 ERA with 2 strikeouts.
