= Adam Eaton (pitcher) =

American baseball player (born 1977)

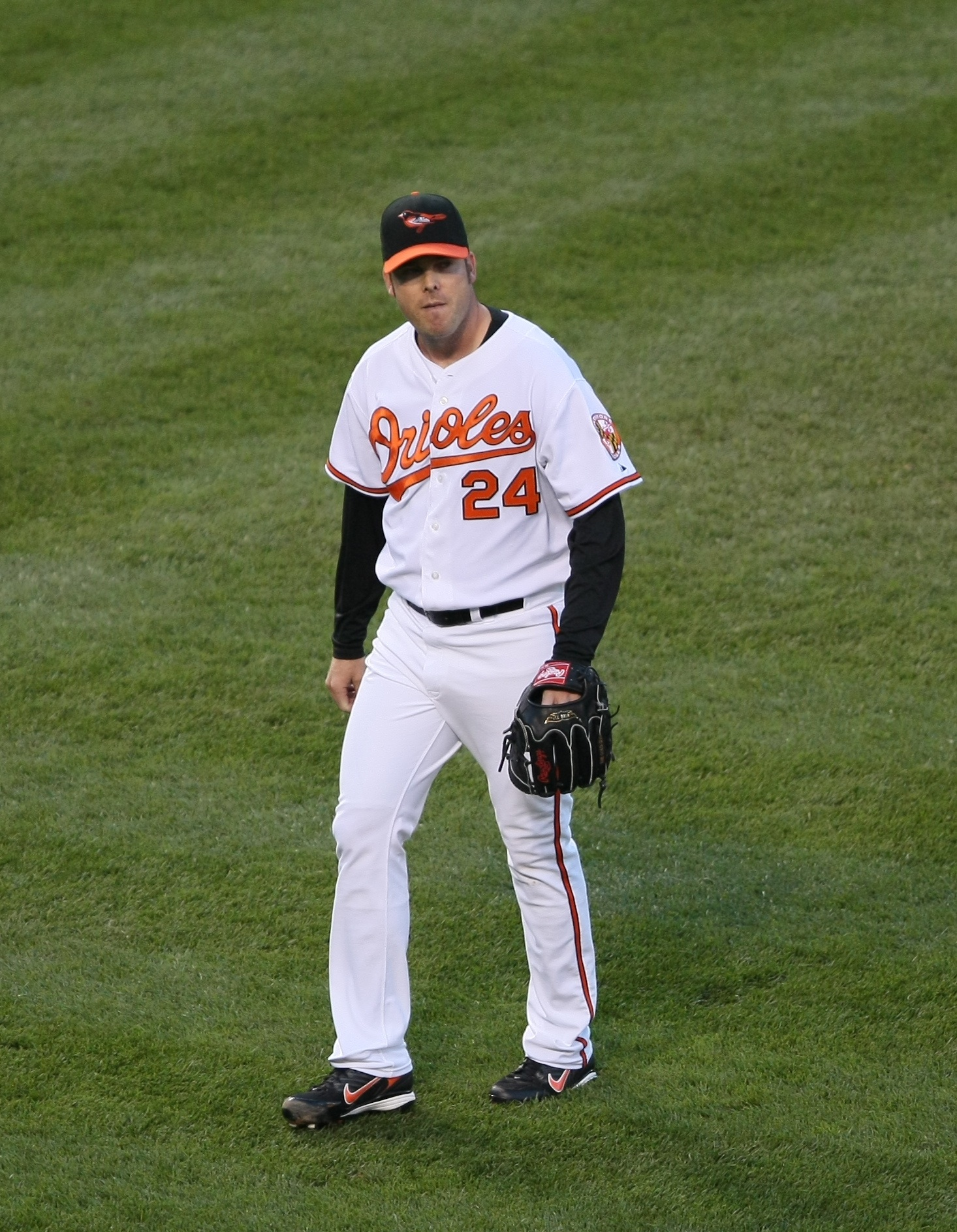
- Eaton with the Baltimore Orioles in 2009
- Pitcher
- Born: November 23, 1977 (age 48); Seattle, Washington, U.S.
- Batted: Right Threw: Right

MLB debut
- May 30, 2000, for the San Diego Padres

Last MLB appearance
- August 24, 2009, for the Colorado Rockies

MLB statistics
- Win–loss record: 71–68
- Earned run average: 4.94
- Strikeouts: 855
- Stats at Baseball Reference

Teams
- San Diego Padres (2000–2005); Texas Rangers (2006); Philadelphia Phillies (2007–2008); Baltimore Orioles (2009); Colorado Rockies (2009)

Adam Thomas Eaton (born November 23, 1977) is an American former professional baseball pitcher. He played in Major League Baseball (MLB) from 2000 through 2009 for the San Diego Padres, Texas Rangers, Philadelphia Phillies, Baltimore Orioles, and Colorado Rockies. With the Phillies, Eaton was a member of the 2008 World Series champions.

== Early career ==
=== High school ===
Eaton graduated from Snohomish High School in 1996 where he went 8–0 with a 0.67 earned run average (ERA) as a senior, and earned second team High School All-America honors from Baseball America. He was named to the All-America First Team by the American Baseball Coaches Association and Rawlings. Ranked the No. 1 prospect in the Pacific Northwest by Baseball America, Eaton was scheduled to attend the University of Washington, but was drafted by the Philadelphia Phillies with the 11th pick in the first round of the 1996 Major League Baseball draft.

=== Minor leagues ===
After signing, the Phillies assigned Eaton to their team in the A-level South Atlantic League, the Piedmont Boll Weevils. Though he spent a month on the disabled list during the 1997 season, he posted a 5–6 record with a 4.18 ERA. Though his ERA went up a quarter of a point to 4.43 in 1998, his record was 9–8 as he struck out 89 batters in 132 innings at Clearwater. He was also named a mid-season All-Star in the Florida State League.1999 saw Eaton climbing his way up the rungs of the Phillies' farm system, starting the year at Clearwater, then earning promotions to Reading and Scranton/Wilkes-Barre. Between the three levels, Eaton posted an 11–10 record and a combined 3.34 ERA, striking out 127 in 167 innings. For his accomplishments, Eaton was honored as the recipient of the Paul Owens Award, given to the top Phillies' minor league pitcher each season. He was traded along with Carlton Loewer and Steve Montgomery from the Phillies to the San Diego Padres for Andy Ashby on November 10, 1999. He posted a 4–1 record in ten starts for the Mobile BayBears.

== Major league career ==
=== 2000–01 ===
Eaton made his major league debut for the Padres on May 30, 2000, against the Milwaukee Brewers, and won his first major league game. He went 7–4 in the 2000 season, striking out 90 in 135 innings, and posting a 4.13 ERA. Eaton did not lose in his first eight starts as a Padre, posting a 1–0 record with a 3.02 ERA. He posted the best day game ERA in the National League (2.34), and became the third Padres pitcher, after Juan Eichelberger and Doug Brocail, to steal two bases in a single season. His batting average (.289) led all major league pitchers. Eaton's first full season in the major leagues, 2001, produced mixed results. Eaton suffered a bizarre injury when he accidentally stabbed himself in the stomach while trying to open a DVD package with a paring knife, and underwent season-ending "Tommy John" surgery on August 21. Before his injuries, Eaton posted an 8–5 record with a 4.32 ERA. This season also produced his first two career complete games, and he posted two ten-strikeout games against the Houston Astros and the San Francisco Giants.

=== 2002–03 ===
After recovering from Tommy John surgery, Eaton made six appearances at the end of the 2002 season for San Diego, finishing his season with a 1–1 record and posting a 1.71 ERA over his last three starts. He pitched each of his six starts against National League West opponents. Eaton's 2003 ERA was a career low (4.08), but he only managed a 9–12 record over his second full season. He pitched at least seven innings in ten of his 31 starts, including a season-high eight innings to earn his third complete game of his career against the Cleveland Indians. Though he started the season weakly, July was Eaton's top month; he posted a 4–0 record and a 2.81 ERA in the month. His nine wins were a career high.

=== 2004–05 ===
2004 was a career year for Eaton, as he reached new levels in wins, with 11; starts, with 33; innings pitched, with 199 1/3; and strikeouts, with 153. He beat the Los Angeles Dodgers, a San Diego rival, four times during the season, posting a 4–1 record and a 2.87 ERA against them. He also won eight games on the road, posting a 2.66 ERA during his seven-game winning streak away from new Petco Park. In a game against the Royals in July he became the eighth different Padre to take a no-hitter into the eighth inning, but was unable to complete the task. In his last year as a Padre, Eaton posted a 9–1 record over his first 13 starts. He pitched his way to a 10–5 record with an ERA of 4.27, but he went on the disabled list in the middle of June with a strained finger. He came back at the end of the season and won his final start against the Dodgers, striking out 11. This win also matched his career high from the previous season.

==== Offseason trade ====
On December 20, 2005, Eaton was traded, along with Akinori Otsuka and Billy Killian to the Texas Rangers for Chris Young, Terrmel Sledge, and Adrián González.

=== 2006 ===
After the trade, Eaton was penciled in as the number two starter for the Rangers going into the 2006 season. However, during a spring training game on March 29, Eaton injured his right middle finger, causing him to go on the 60-day DL and miss the first half of the season. Eaton made his first start as a Ranger against the New York Yankees on July 25, going 3 2/3 innings and giving up one hit and three earned runs.

==== Signs with Phillies ====
On November 27, 2006, Eaton signed a three-year deal worth $24 million to re-join the team that drafted him, the Philadelphia Phillies.

=== 2007 ===
Eaton made his debut for the Phillies on April 5, 2007 against the Atlanta Braves. He pitched 4 2/3 innings giving up 7 earned runs and took the loss. Eaton was the losing pitcher of record when the Phillies lost their 10,000th game in franchise-history on July 15, 2007, to the St. Louis Cardinals, 10–2, marking the first time a professional sports franchise reached that plateau. Eaton was 10–10 with an earned run average of 6.29, one of the worst in the league; despite this, the Phillies won the National League Eastern Division for the first time since 1993. However, Eaton was not included in the postseason roster.

=== 2008 ===
Eaton's performance with the Phillies in the first half of the 2008 season was also decidedly poor; through July 12, he notched a 3–8 record in 19 starts with an earned run average of 5.71. His last two outings before the All-Star break were a prime example; he yielded a combined 17 hits and 14 runs in 6 1/3 innings against the New York Mets and Arizona Diamondbacks. It was announced on July 18 that Eaton would lose his spot in the Phillies' rotation to newly acquired Joe Blanton. Eaton was optioned to the minor leagues on July 28, 2008. He did not return to the majors until he was added to the September callups as a bullpen pitcher. He did not appear in any game after his callup.

=== 2009 ===
Two days after he was released by the Phillies, Eaton signed a minor league contract with the Baltimore Orioles on March 1, 2009. In an interview with MLB.com after his release from the Phillies, he claimed he was partially responsible for the Phillies' success in 2007 and 2008: "A lot of things went wrong, but [there were] a lot of things that went right, too. I helped them get to the playoffs two years in a row, and obviously we won the World Series last year." He was promoted to the Orioles after spending the first week of the 2009 major league season with the Norfolk Tides. He was released on May 22 after going 2–5 with an 8.56 ERA in eight starts.

==== Colorado Rockies ====
On June 6, Eaton signed a minor league contract with the Colorado Rockies. On September 9 he was designated for assignment.

Eaton was granted free agency on October 6, 2009.
