= Francisco Rosario =

Dominican baseball player (born 1980)

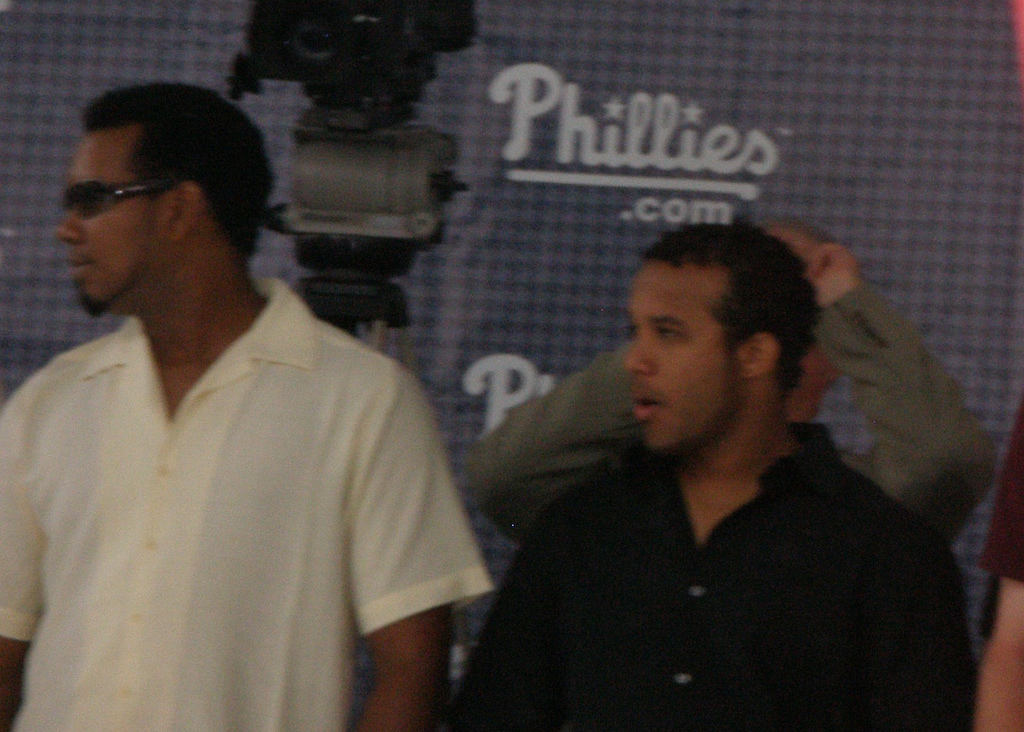
- Rosario (left) and Fabio Castro in 2007

Free agent
- Relief pitcher
- Born: September 28, 1980 (age 45); San Rafael del Yuma, Dominican Republic
- Bats: Right Throws: Right

MLB debut
- May 6, 2006, for the Toronto Blue Jays

MLB statistics (through 2010 season)
- Win–loss record: 1–5
- Earned run average: 6.02
- Strikeouts: 46
- Stats at Baseball Reference

Teams
- Toronto Blue Jays (2006); Philadelphia Phillies (2007)

Francisco Alberto Rosario Divison (born September 28, 1980) is a Dominican professional baseball right-handed relief pitcher who is currently a free agent. who played in Major League Baseball (MLB) for the Toronto Blue Jays and Philadelphia Phillies, from 2006 to 2007.

== Baseball career ==
Rosario was originally signed as an undrafted amateur free agent by the Toronto Blue Jays, on January 11, 1999. He missed all of 2003 recuperating from Tommy John surgery. Throughout the minors, Rosario showed flashes of excellence, but was mostly inconsistent. Originally a starting pitcher, he was converted to the bullpen in mid-2005.

Rosario's MLB debut came with the Blue Jays, in a relief appearance, against the Los Angeles Angels of Anaheim, on May 6, 2006. He pitched a hitless 8th inning, while walking one and striking out one. Rosario's first big league win came on May 10, 2006, with Toronto, against the Oakland Athletics. That night, he pitched a scoreless 5th and 6th inning, giving up only two hits, while striking out three, and not giving up a single walk; out of 31 pitches thrown, 22 were strikes.

Rosario made his first, and only, big league start, August 5, 2006, going three innings for the Blue Jays against the Chicago White Sox. He threw 71 pitches, including 41 strikes. Rosario struck out two, walked two, and gave up five hits, three runs, all of which were earned.

Rosario was acquired by the Philadelphia Phillies, on April 5, 2007, for cash considerations. He appeared in 23 games with the Phillies that year. Rosario was injured that June, then spent some time with the Minor League Baseball (MiLB) Clearwater Threshers, on a rehab assignment. He missed most of 2008, appearing in just three games that year, all with the Threshers. Rosario then missed all of 2009.

On November 23, 2009, Rosario signed a minor league contract with the New York Mets, but was subsequently released. On December 11, 2009, he signed a minor league contract with the Kansas City Royals. Rosario was released on March 31, 2010.

He subsequently signed with the Mexican League Guerreros de Oaxaca, for the 2010 season, pitching in seven games for them, that year. On April 9, 2011, Rosario was released. On April 28, 2012, Rosario signed with the Diablos Rojos del Mexico. After 5 years with the Diablos, on February 16, 2017, Rosario was assigned to the Rieleros de Aguascalientes. On June 30, 2019, he was released. On July 4, 2019, Rosario was assigned to the Tecolotes de los Dos Laredos. On October 8, 2019, Rosario was released by the Tecolotes.

Rosario throws a 92-96 mph fastball and a good changeup.
