= Yoel Hernández (baseball) =

Venezuelan baseball player

- Relief pitcher
- Born: April 15, 1980 (age 46); Ciudad Bolívar, Venezuela
- Batted: Right Threw: Right

MLB debut
- May 5, 2007, for the Philadelphia Phillies

Last MLB appearance
- August 19, 2007, for the Philadelphia Phillies

MLB statistics
- Win–loss record: 0–0
- Earned run average: 5.28
- Strikeouts: 13
- Stats at Baseball Reference

Teams
- Philadelphia Phillies (2007)

Yoel Alejandro Hernández (born April 15, 1980) is a Venezuelan former professional baseball relief pitcher, who played in Major League Baseball (MLB) for the Philadelphia Phillies.

== Career ==
Hernández was signed by the Philadelphia Phillies as a free agent in 1998 and was added to the Phillies 40-man roster prior to the 2005 season. At the time he owned the best slider in the organization, according to Baseball America.

From 2000 through 2006, Hernández posted a 34–36 record with a 3.45 ERA and 17 saves in 204 games at five different levels. In 2000, he was selected to the Gulf Coast League All-Star team. He then started 2007 with the Triple-A Ottawa Lynx, where he went 1-0 with a 1.74 and six saves before joining the Phillies in May as a replacement for injured Tom Gordon.

In between, Hernández has pitched for several teams of the Mexican League as well as for the Águilas del Zulia, Leones del Caracas and Navegantes del Magallanes clubs of the Venezuelan Winter League.

He was selected to the roster for the Venezuela national baseball team at the 2015 WBSC Premier12.

In 2026, Hernandez was named as pitching coach of the FCL Blue Jays the rookie-level affiliate of the Toronto Blue Jays.

== See also ==
- List of Major League Baseball players from Venezuela
