= 2007 Florida Marlins season =

2007 Florida Marlins
- League: National League
- Division: East
- Ballpark: Dolphin Stadium
- City: Miami Gardens, Florida
- Record: 71–91 (.438)
- Divisional place: 5th
- Owners: Jeffrey Loria
- General managers: Larry Beinfest
- Managers: Fredi González
- Television: FSN Florida; Sun Sports; Rich Waltz, Tommy Hutton, Craig Minervini
- Radio: WQAM; Dave Van Horne, Roxy Bernstein; WQBA (Spanish)

The 2007 Florida Marlins season was the 15th season for the Major League Baseball (MLB) franchise in the National League. It would begin with the team attempting to improve on their promising 78–84 record in 2006. Despite the success of the team under manager Joe Girardi, he was fired and replaced with Fredi González.

Marlins general manager Larry Beinfest said that the team's goal from the start of the season was to compete in the playoffs. However, failed to make the playoffs for the fourth consecutive season.

The Marlins had two goals to address during the 2006 offseason: they needed a new closer because '06 closer Joe Borowski signed with the Cleveland Indians as a free agent, and the Marlins saw the need for a new center fielder. They had platooned Eric Reed, Reggie Abercrombie, Chris Aguila, Cody Ross, and Alfredo Amézaga in the position in 2006, with backup shortstop Amézaga making most of the starts at that position later in the season. The Marlins had added some new relief pitchers since 2006, trading Chris Resop to the Los Angeles Angels for Kevin Gregg and shipping prospects Jason Vargas and Adam Bostick to the New York Mets for Henry Owens and Matt Lindstrom. Lindstrom has been a closer during his time in the minors and has a fastball that reached 100 mph on radar guns in winter league play during the 2006 offseason. The Marlins saw much competition for their closer role, with Ricky Nolasco, Renyel Pinto, Mike Koplove, Gregg, Lindstrom, and Owens all candidates for the job. In April, newly acquired Jorge Julio was named closer, but on May 13, he was traded to the Colorado Rockies for Byung-hyun Kim.

The Marlins signed center fielder Alex Sánchez to a minor league deal in the offseason, who competed for the Marlins' center field job with Reed, Abercrombie, Ross, and Amézaga. Beinfest said that the Marlins tried to trade for a proven center fielder but were asked for too much in order to get one. However, Sánchez was released at the end of spring training and the starting role was handed to rookie Alejandro De Aza.

== Regular season ==
=== Season standings ===
==== National League East ====
NL East
Team	W	L	Pct.	GB	Home	Road
Philadelphia Phillies	89	73	.549	—	47‍–‍34	42‍–‍39
New York Mets	88	74	.543	1	41‍–‍40	47‍–‍34
Atlanta Braves	84	78	.519	5	44‍–‍37	40‍–‍41
Washington Nationals	73	89	.451	16	40‍–‍41	33‍–‍48
Florida Marlins	71	91	.438	18	36‍–‍45	35‍–‍46

==== Record vs. opponents ====
2007 National League record Source: MLB Standings Grid – 2007
Team	AZ	ATL	CHC	CIN	COL	FLA	HOU	LAD	MIL	NYM	PHI	PIT	SD	SF	STL	WAS	AL
Arizona	—	4–2	4–2	2–4	8–10	6–1	5–2	8–10	2–5	3–4	5–1	5–4	10–8	10–8	4–3	6–1	8–7
Atlanta	2–4	—	5–4	1–6	4–2	10–8	3–3	4–3	5–2	9–9	9–9	5–1	5–2	4–3	3–4	11–7	4–11
Chicago	2–4	4–5	—	9–9	5–2	0–6	8–7	2–5	9–6	2–5	3–4	8–7	3–5	5–2	11–5	6–1	8–4
Cincinnati	4–2	6–1	9–9	—	2–4	4–3	4–11	2–4	8–7	2–5	2–4	9–7	2–4	4–3	6–9	1–6	7-11
Colorado	10–8	2–4	2–5	4–2	—	3–3	3–4	12–6	4–2	4–2	4–3	4–3	11–8	10–8	3–4	4–3	10–8
Florida	1–6	8–10	6–0	3–4	3–3	—	2–3	4–3	2–5	7–11	9–9	3–4	3–4	1–6	2–4	8–10	9–9
Houston	2–5	3–3	7–8	11–4	4–3	3-2	—	4–3	5–13	2–5	3–3	5–10	4–3	2–4	7–9	2–5	9–9
Los Angeles	10–8	3–4	5–2	4–2	6–12	3–4	3–4	—	3–3	5–5	4–2	5–2	8–10	10–8	3–3	5–1	5–10
Milwaukee	5–2	2–5	6–9	7–8	2–4	5–2	13–5	3–3	—	2–4	3–4	10–6	2–5	4–5	7–8	4–2	8–7
New York	4–3	9–9	5–2	5–2	2–4	11–7	5–2	5–5	4–2	—	6–12	4–2	2–4	4–2	5–2	9–9	8–7
Philadelphia	1-5	9–9	4–3	4–2	3–4	9–9	3–3	2–4	4–3	12–6	—	4–2	4–3	4–4	6–3	12–6	8–7
Pittsburgh	4–5	1–5	7–8	7–9	3–4	4–3	10–5	2–5	6–10	2–4	2–4	—	1–6	4–2	6–12	4–2	5–10
San Diego	8–10	2–5	5–3	4–2	8–11	4–3	3–4	10–8	5–2	4–2	3–4	6–1	—	14–4	3–4	4–2	6–9
San Francisco	8–10	3–4	2–5	3–4	8–10	6–1	4–2	8–10	5–4	2–4	4–4	2–4	4–14	—	4–1	3–4	5–10
St. Louis	3–4	4–3	5–11	9–6	4–3	4-2	9–7	3–3	8–7	2–5	3–6	12–6	4–3	1–4	—	1–5	6–9
Washington	1–6	7–11	1–6	6–1	3–4	10-8	5–2	1–5	2–4	9–9	6–12	2–4	2–4	4–3	5–1	—	9–9

=== Game log ===
2007 game log
April

#	Date	Opponent	Score	Win	Loss	Save	Attendance	Record
1	April 2	@ Nationals	9 - 2	Willis (1-0)	Patterson (0-1)		40,389	1-0
2	April 3	@ Nationals	9 - 3	Olsen (1-0)	Hill (0-1)		20,894	2-0
3	April 4	@ Nationals	7 - 6	Rauch (1-0)	Julio (0-1)		18,835	2-1
4	April 6	Phillies	8 - 2	Moyer (1-0)	Mitre (0-1)		40,397	2-2
5	April 7	Phillies	8 - 5	Willis (2-0)	Myers (0-1)		32,419	3-2
6	April 8	Phillies	6 - 4	Olsen (2-0)	Segovia (0-1)	Gardner (1)	16,308	4-2
7	April 9	Brewers	5 - 3	Sánchez (1-0)	Suppan (0-2)	Owens (1)	11,157	5-2
8	April 10	Brewers	3 - 2* (13)	Dessens (1-0)	Pinto (0-1)	Cordero (2)	10,883	5-3
9	April 11	Brewers	5 - 2	Bush (1-1)	Mitre (0-2)	Cordero (3)	11,379	5-4
10	April 13	@ Braves	11 - 4	Willis (3-0)	Redman (0-2)		33,212	6-4
--	April 14	@ Braves	Postponed (rain) Rescheduled for June 5					6-4
11	April 15	@ Braves	8 - 4	Hudson (2-0)	Olsen (2-1)		25,189	6-5
12	April 16	@ Astros	4 - 3	Qualls (2-1)	Gregg (0-1)		30,665	6-6
13	April 17	@ Astros	6 - 1	Oswalt (3-0)	Julio (0-2)		38,106	6-7
14	April 18	Mets	9 - 2	Maine (2-0)	Willis (3-1)		17,219	6-8
15	April 19	Mets	11 - 3	Hernández (2-1)	VandenHurk (0-1)		11,815	6-9
16	April 20	Nationals	6 - 5 (14)	Colomé (2-0)	Gardner (0-1)	Rivera (1)	16,469	6-10
17	April 21	Nationals	9 - 3	Sánchez (2-0)	Chico (1-2)		24,107	7-10
18	April 22	Nationals	12 - 6	Obermueller (1-0)	Williams (0-3)	Gregg (1)	18,443	8-10
19	April 23	Braves	8 - 7	Willis (4-1)	Davies (0-1)	Pinto (1)	13,227	9-10
20	April 24	Braves	11 - 6	Moylan (1-0)	Lindstrom (0-1)		11,507	9-11
21	April 25	Braves	4 - 3	Owens (1-0)	Wickman (1-1)		13,310	10-11
22	April 27	@ Phillies	6 - 5	Gordon (1-1)	Messenger (0-1)		32,331	10-12
23	April 28	@ Phillies	11 - 5	Willis (5-1)	Eaton (2-2)		36,914	11-12
24	April 29	@ Phillies	6 - 1	Moyer (3-1)	Obermueller (1-1)		45,107	11-13
25	April 30	@ Mets	9 - 6	Olsen (3-1)	Park (0-1)	Owens (2)	39,383	12-13
*Game suspended, completed April 11

May

#	Date	Opponent	Score	Win	Loss	Save	Attendance	Record
26	May 1	@ Mets	5 - 2	Nolasco (1-0)	Pelfrey (0-3)	Owens (3)	48,458	13-13
27	May 2	@ Mets	6 - 3	Pérez (3-2)	Sánchez (2-1)	Wagner (5)	25,236	13-14
28	May 4	Padres	5 - 4	Tankersley (1-0)	Linebrink (1-1)	Owens (4)	24,691	14-14
29	May 5	Padres	7 - 6 (12)	Hampson (1-1)	Gardner (0-2)	Hoffman (7)	21,381	14-15
30	May 6	Padres	3 - 1	Peavy (4-1)	Olsen (3-2)	Hoffman (8)	15,310	14-16
31	May 7	Dodgers	6 - 1	Penny (4-0)	Nolasco (1-1)		12,252	14-17
32	May 8	Dodgers	6 - 5	Owens (2-0)	Broxton (1-1)		11,124	15-17
33	May 9	Dodgers	5 - 3	Tomko (1-3)	Willis (5-2)	Saito (10)	12,213	15-18
34	May 10	Dodgers	3 - 0	Tankersley (2-0)	Lowe (3-4)		20,345	16-18
35	May 11	@ Nationals	6 - 0	Hill (3-3)	Olsen (3-3)		23,006	16-19
36	May 12	@ Nationals	7 - 3	Rauch (2-0)	Tankersley (2-1)		19,278	16-20
37	May 13	@ Nationals	6 - 4	Simontacchi (1-1)	Obermueller (1-2)	Rauch (1)	20,486	16-21
38	May 14	@ Pirates	7 - 0	Gorzelanny (5-2)	Willis (5-3)		12,958	16-22
39	May 15	@ Pirates	9 - 3	Mitre (1-2)	Maholm (2-5)		12,769	17-22
40	May 16	@ Pirates	4 - 3	Tankersley (3-1)	Capps (2-1)	Gregg (2)	15,086	18-22
41	May 17	@ Pirates	7 - 2	Chacón (1-0)	Nolasco (1-2)		9,582	18-23
42	May 18	@ Devil Rays	8 - 4	Kim (2-2)	Jackson (0-6)		13,003	19-23
43	May 19	@ Devil Rays	7 - 2	Willis (6-3)	Seo (2-4)		19,566	20-23
44	May 20	@ Devil Rays	4 - 3	Mitre (2-2)	Shawn Camp (0-1)	Gregg (3)	23,554	21-23
45	May 22	Phillies	5 - 3	Olsen (4-3)	Hamels (6-2)	Gregg (4)	11,162	22-23
46	May 23	Phillies	8 - 7 (10)	Condrey (2-0)	Gregg (0-2)		11,575	22-24
47	May 24	Phillies	5 - 4 (11)	Gardner (1-2)	Rosario (0-3)		11,811	23-24
48	May 25	Mets	6 - 2	Heilman (5-2)	Pinto (0-2)		24,278	23-25
49	May 26	Mets	7 - 2	Maine (6-2)	Obermueller (1-3)		34,505	23-26
50	May 27	Mets	6 - 4	Sosa (4-1)	Olsen (4-4)	Wagner (12)	23,622	23-27
51	May 28	@ Cubs	5 - 1	Kim (3-2)	Marshall (0-2)	Gregg (5)	41,630	24-27
52	May 29	@ Cubs	9 - 4	Willis (7-3)	Marquis (5-2)	Gregg (6)	39,788	25-27
53	May 30	@ Cubs	9 - 0	Messenger (1-1)	Lilly (4-3)		36,699	26-27
54	May 31	@ Brewers	4 - 3	Villanueva (4-0)	Lindstrom (0-2)	Cordero (19)	17,704	26-28

June

#	Date	Opponent	Score	Win	Loss	Save	Attendance	Record
55	June 1	@ Brewers	8 - 5	Suppan (7-5)	Olsen (4-5)	Cordero (20)	30,852	26-29
56	June 2	@ Brewers	5 - 2	Lindstrom (1-2)	Capellán (0-1)	Gregg (7)	42,250	27-29
57	June 3	@ Brewers	3 - 0	Sheets (6-3)	Willis (7-4)	Cordero (21)	43,172	27-30
58	June 4	@ Braves	6 - 4	Obermueller (2-3)	Hudson (6-4)	Gregg (8)	22,175	28-30
59	June 5	@ Braves	3 - 1	Carlyle (1-1)	Pinto (0-3)	Wickman (10)	20,863	28-31
60	June 5	@ Braves	4 - 2	VandenHurk (1-1)	Smoltz (7-3)		27,072	29-31
61	June 6	@ Braves	7 - 4	Miller (1-0)	Davies (3-4)	Gregg (9)	28,026	30-31
62	June 8	Devil Rays	14 - 8	Miller (2-0)	Stokes (2-6)		13,520	31-31
63	June 9	Devil Rays	7 - 2	Shields (6-0)	Willis (7-5)		20,189	31-32
64	June 10	Devil Rays	9 - 4	Sonnanstine (1-0)	VandenHurk (1-2)		11,525	31-33
65	June 12	Indians	3 - 0	Olsen (5-5)	Carmona (7-2)	Gregg (10)	15,144	32-33
66	June 13	Indians	7 - 3	Lee (3-4)	Kim (3-3)		13,805	32-34
67	June 14	Indians	3 - 2	Stanford (1-0)	Willis (7-6)	Borowski (19)	23,811	32-35
68	June 15	@ Royals	6 - 2	Meche (4-6)	Mitre (2-3)	Dotel (4)	28,015	32-36
69	June 16	@ Royals	9 - 8	VandenHurk (2-2)	de la Rosa (4-7)	Gregg (11)	24,323	33-36
70	June 17	@ Royals	5 - 4	Bannister (5-6)	Olsen (5-6)	Dotel (5)	19,433	33-37
71	June 18	@ White Sox	10 - 6	Contreras (5-7)	Johnson (0-1)	Jenks (18)	36,132	33-38
72	June 19	@ White Sox	7 - 5	Benítez (1-3)	Thornton (2-3)	Gregg (12)	35,327	34-38
73	June 20	@ White Sox	5 - 4	Tankersley (4-1)	Garland	Gregg (13)	32,007	35-38
74	June 22	Twins	5 - 4	Benítez (2-3)	Rincón (2-1)	Gregg (14)	15,271	36-38
75	June 23	Twins	11 - 1	Silva (5-8)	Johnson (0-2)		21,368	36-39
76	June 24	Twins	7 - 4	Santana (8-6)	Kim (3-4)		15,035	36-40
77	June 26	Pirates	3 - 2	Maholm (4-10)	Willis (7-7)	Capps (6)	11,044	36-41
78	June 27	Pirates	7 - 5 (10)	Chacon (4-1)	Gregg (0-3)	Capps (7)	11,222	36-42
79	June 28	Pirates	9 - 7	Olsen (6-6)	Duke (3-7)		31,628	37-42
80	June 29	Braves	12 - 3	James (7-7)	Johnson (0-3)		17,181	37-43
81	June 30	Braves	6 - 5	Hudson (8-5)	Benítez (2-4)	Yates (1)	24,229	37-44

July

#	Date	Opponent	Score	Win	Loss	Save	Attendance	Record
82	July 1	Braves	6 - 5 (10)	Gardner (2-2)	Soriano (2-1)		14,311	38-44
83	July 2	@ Padres	3 - 1	Wells (4-5)	Mitre (2-4)	Hoffman (24)	25,857	38-45
84	July 3	@ Padres	6 - 4	Miller (3-0)	Maddux (7-5)	Gregg (16)	34,488	39-45
85	July 4	@ Padres	1 - 0	Bell (2-2)	Lindstrom (1-3)		27,941	39-46
86	July 5	@ Padres	3 - 2	Kim (4-4)	Peavy (9-3)	Gregg (17)	32,496	40-46
87	July 6	@ Dodgers	6 - 5 (10)	Pinto (1-3)	Tomko (1-7)	Gregg (18)	51,050	41-46
88	July 7	@ Dodgers	7 - 2	Mitre (3-4)	Lowe (8-8)		46,177	42-46
89	July 8	@ Dodgers	9 - 3	Hendrickson (3-4)	Olsen (6-7)		44,021	42-47
90	July 13	Nationals	14 - 10	Rivera (3-2)	Willis (7-8)		11,438	42-48
91	July 14	Nationals	5 - 2	Mitre (4-4)	Chico (4-6)	Gregg (19)	21,012	43-48
92	July 15	Nationals	5 - 3	Olsen (7-7)	Simontacchi (6-7)	Gregg (20)	12,119	44-48
93	July 16	Cardinals	5 - 3	Looper (7-7)	Kim (4-5)	Isringhausen (18)	13,827	44-49
94	July 17	Cardinals	4 - 0	VandenHurk (3-2)	Thompson (6-4)		12,475	45-49
95	July 18	Cardinals	6 - 0	Wells (4-12)	Willis (7-9)		12,819	45-50
96	July 19	Reds	7 - 5	Coffey (2-1)	Benítez (2-5)	Weathers (19)	10,344	45-51
97	July 20	Reds	10 - 2	Olsen (8-7)	Lohse (5-12)		15,313	46-51
98	July 21	Reds	11 - 1	Kim (5-5)	Livingston (2-1)		21,823	47-51
99	July 22	Reds	9 - 3	Pinto (2-3)	Arroyo (4-11)		14,123	48-51
100	July 23	@ Diamondbacks	4 - 3	Davis (7-10)	Willis (7-10)	Valverde (31)	19,620	48-52
101	July 24	@ Diamondbacks	9 - 3	Hernández (6-6)	Mitre (4-5)		21,035	48-53
102	July 25	@ Diamondbacks	7 - 0	Webb (9-8)	Olsen (8-8)		20,154	48-54
103	July 26	@ Diamondbacks	7 - 4	Peña (5-2)	Benítez (2-6)		18,721	48-55
104	July 27	@ Giants	12 - 10	Chulk (4-2)	Pinto (2-4)		42,831	48-56
105	July 28	@ Giants	4 - 3	Taschner (2-0)	Gregg (0-4)		43,001	48-57
106	July 29	@ Giants	8 - 5	Mitre (5-5)	Morris (7-7)	Gregg (21)	42,965	49-57
107	July 31	Rockies	6 - 3	Cook (8-6)	Olsen (8-9)	Corpas (7)	11,534	49-58

August

#	Date	Opponent	Score	Win	Loss	Save	Attendance	Record
108	August 1	Rockies	4 - 3	Kim (6-5)	Fogg (5-7)	Gregg (22)	11,556	50-58
109	August 2	Rockies	4 - 3	Hawkins (2-5)	Benítez (2-7)	Corpas (8)	11,927	50-59
110	August 3	Astros	8 - 2	Oswalt (11-6)	Willis (7-11)		15,226	50-60
111	August 4	Astros	6 - 5 (12)	Gardner (3-2)	Randolph (0-1)		22,112	51-60
112	August 5	Astros	6 - 5	Olsen (9-9)	Albers (2-5)	Gregg (23)	14,622	52-60
113	August 7	@ Phillies	11 - 1	Moyer (10-8)	VandenHurk (3-3)	Durbin (1)	32,791	52-61
114	August 8	@ Phillies	6 - 4	Lohse (7-12)	Willis (7-12)	Myers (8)	34,139	52-62
115	August 9	@ Phillies	4 - 2	Tankersley (5-1)	Myers (2-4)	Gregg (24)	37,009	53-62
116	August 10	@ Mets	4 - 3	Lindstrom (2-3)	Wagner (1-1)	Gregg (25)	48,516	54-62
117	August 11	@ Mets	7 - 5	Miller (4-0)	Heilman (7-4)	Gregg (26)	50,773	55-62
118	August 12	@ Mets	10 - 4	Sosa (8-6)	Gardner (3-3)		51,023	55-63
119	August 14	Diamondbacks	14 - 5	Willis (8-12)	Kim (6-6)		10,610	56-63
120	August 15	Diamondbacks	9 - 6	Davis (10-10)	Mitre (5-6)	Valverde (36)	11,472	56-64
121	August 16	Diamondbacks	5 - 4	Hernández (9-7)	Barone (0-1)	Valverde (37)	11,516	56-65
122	August 17	Giants	3 - 0	Zito (9-11)	Olsen (9-10)	Hennessey (10)	25,079	56-66
123	August 18	Giants	4 - 3	Cain (5-13)	VandenHurk (3-4)	Hennessey (11)	42,817	56-67
124	August 19	Giants	6 - 5	Chulk (5-4)	Gardner (3-4)	Hennessey (12)	15,351	56-68
125	August 20	Giants	8 - 7	Taschner (3-1)	Wolf (0-1)	Wilson (1)	10,907	56-69
126	August 21	@ Cardinals	5 - 2	Percival (3-0)	Benítez (2-8)	Isringhausen (24)	42,059	56-70
127	August 22	@ Cardinals	6 - 4	Springer (6-1)	Olsen (9-11)	Isringhausen (25)	42,147	56-71
128	August 23	@ Cardinals	11 - 3	VandenHurk (4-4)	Reyes (2-13)		42,123	57-71
129	August 24	@ Reds	5 - 3	Harang (13-3)	Willis (8-13)	Weathers (28)	25,773	57-72
130	August 25	@ Reds	11 - 7	Belisle (7-8)	Mitre (5-7)		32,288	57-73
131	August 26	@ Reds	9 - 3	Shearn (1-0)	Barone (0-2)		23,122	57-74
132	August 27	Braves	13 - 2	Cormier (1-4)	Olsen (9-12)		11,716	57-75
133	August 28	Braves	4 - 3 (11)	Kim (7-6)	Villarreal (2-2)		11,539	58-75
134	August 29	Braves	7 - 4	Carlyle (8-5)	Willis (8-14)	Soriano (6)	12,633	58-76
135	August 31	Phillies	9 - 2	Kendrick (8-3)	Mitre (5-8)		15,231	58-77

September

#	Date	Opponent	Score	Win	Loss	Save	Attendance	Record
136	September 1	Phillies	12 - 6	Kim (8-6)	Durbin (6-4)	Gregg (27)	24,651	59-77
137	September 2	Phillies	7 - 6	Miller (5-0)	Davis (0-1)	Gregg (28)	12,334	60-77
138	September 3	@ Nationals	6 - 3	Bergmann (3-5)	VandenHurk (4-5)	Cordero (30)	27,592	60-78
139	September 4	@ Nationals	4 - 3	Schroder (2-1)	Gregg (0-5)		15,611	60-79
140	September 5	@ Nationals	6 - 4	Ayala (1-2)	Lindstrom (2-4)	Cordero (31)	19,222	60-80
141	September 7	@ Phillies	6 - 3	Kim (9-6)	Durbin (6-5)	Gregg (29)	38,696	61-80
142	September 8	@ Phillies	9 - 1	Condrey (5-0)	VandenHurk (4-6)		38,559	61-81
143	September 9	@ Phillies	8 - 5	Moyer (13-11)	Willis (8-15)	Myers (15)	32,574	61-82
144	September 10	Nationals	5 - 4	Hill (4-3)	Olsen (9-13)	Cordero (33)	12,345	61-83
145	September 11	Nationals	13 - 8	Lindstrom (3-4)	Schroder (2-2)		11,078	62-83
146	September 12	Nationals	5 - 4 (12)	Barone (1-2)	Rivera (4-6)		10,121	63-83
147	September 14	@ Rockies	7 - 6	Willis (9-15)	Herges (4-1)	Gregg (30)	22,400	64-83
148	September 15	@ Rockies	10 - 2	Kensing (1-0)	Jiménez (3-4)		26,079	65-83
149	September 16	@ Rockies	13 - 0	Morales (2-2)	Olsen (9-14)		19,161	65-84
150	September 17	@ Braves	11 - 6	Smoltz (14-7)	Kim (9-7)		20,957	65-85
151	September 18	@ Braves	4 - 3	Reyes (1-2)	Seddon (0-1)	Soriano (7)	22,076	65-86
152	September 19	@ Braves	5 - 1	James (11-10)	Barone (1-3)		24,449	65-87
153	September 20	Mets	8 - 7 (10)	Tankersley (6-1)	Sosa (9-8)		15,132	66-87
154	September 21	Mets	9 - 6	Martínez (3-0)	Olsen (9-15)	Schoeneweis (1)	25,666	66-88
155	September 22	Mets	7 - 2	Pérez (15-9)	Kim (9-8)		22,517	66-89
156	September 23	Mets	7 - 6 (11)	Smith (3-1)	García (0-1)	Schoeneweis (2)	17,130	66-90
157	September 25	Cubs	4 - 2	Willis (10-15)	Lilly (15-8)	Tankersley (1)	16,044	67-90
158	September 26	Cubs	7 - 4	Kensing (2-0)	Marquis (12-9)	Gardner (2)	19,051	68-90
159	September 27	Cubs	6 - 4	Olsen (10-15)	Trachsel (7-11)	Gregg (31)	24,809	69-90
160	September 28	@ Mets	7 - 4	Kim (10-8)	Pérez (15-10)	Gregg (32)	55,298	70-90
161	September 29	@ Mets	13 - 0	Maine (15-10)	Seddon (0-2)		54,675	70-91
162	September 30	@ Mets	8 - 1	Kensing (3-0)	Glavine (13-8)		54,453	71-91

=== Roster ===
2007 Florida Marlins
Roster
Pitchers: 38 Daniel Barone; 49 Armando Benítez; 50 Marcos Carvajal; 40 Nate Field; 68 Harvey García; 48 Lee Gardner; 63 Kevin Gregg; 55 Josh Johnson; 50 Jorge Julio; 19 Logan Kensing; 39,38,23 Byung-hyun Kim; 22 Matt Lindstrom; 60 Carlos Martinez; 23 Randy Messenger; 32 Justin Miller; 52 Sergio Mitre; 47 Ricky Nolasco; 41 Wes Obermueller; 34 Scott Olsen; 77 Henry Owens; 37 Renyel Pinto; 50 Erasmo Ramirez; 36 Aníbal Sánchez; 59 Chris Seddon; 57 Taylor Tankersley; 56 Rick VandenHurk; 35,42 Dontrelle Willis; 51 Ross Wolf; 58 Mauro Zárate	Catchers: 13 Paul Hoover; 30 Miguel Olivo; 20 Matt Treanor; Infielders: 11 Robert Andino; 8 Aaron Boone; 24 Miguel Cabrera; 17 Mike Jacobs; 2 Hanley Ramírez; 6 Dan Uggla; 28 Jason Wood	Outfielders: 61 Reggie Abercrombie; 4 Alfredo Amézaga; 21 Joe Borchard; 25 Brett Carroll; 7 Alejandro De Aza; 31 John Gall; 27 Jeremy Hermida; 26 Todd Linden; 1 Eric Reed; 12 Cody Ross; 14 Josh Willingham	Manager: 33 Fredi González; Coaches: 67 Pierre Arsenault (bullpen coordinator); 54 Steve Foster (bullpen); 9 Andy Fox (first base/infield); 39 Rick Kranitz (pitching); 16 Bo Porter (third base); 18 Jim Presley (hitting); 10 Carlos Tosca (bench)

== Player stats ==
=== Batting ===
==== Starters by position ====
Note: Pos = Position; G = Games played; AB = At bats; H = Hits; Avg. = Batting average; HR = Home runs; RBI = Runs batted in

Pos	Player	G	AB	H	Avg.	HR	RBI
C	Miguel Olivo	122	452	107	.237	16	60
1B	Mike Jacobs	114	426	113	.265	17	54
2B	Dan Uggla	159	632	155	.245	31	88
SS	Hanley Ramírez	154	639	212	.332	29	81
3B	Miguel Cabrera	157	588	188	.320	34	119
LF	Josh Willingham	144	521	138	.265	21	89
CF	Alfredo Amézaga	133	400	105	.263	2	30
RF	Jeremy Hermida	123	429	127	.296	18	63

==== Other batters ====
Note: G = Games played; AB = At bats; H = Hits; Avg. = Batting average; HR = Home runs; RBI = Runs batted in

Player	G	AB	H	Avg.	HR	RBI
Aaron Boone	69	189	54	.286	5	28
Joe Borchard	85	179	35	.196	4	19
Cody Ross	66	173	58	.335	12	39
Matt Treanor	55	171	46	.269	4	19
Alejandro De Aza	45	144	33	.229	0	8
Todd Linden	85	129	35	.271	1	8
Jason Wood	98	117	28	.239	3	26
Reggie Abercrombie	35	76	15	.197	2	5
Brett Carroll	23	49	9	.184	0	2
Eric Reed	18	20	2	.100	0	0
Robert Andino	7	13	5	.385	0	0
Paul Hoover	3	8	3	.375	0	0
John Gall	3	4	0	.000	0	0

=== Pitching ===
==== Starting pitchers ====
Note: G = Games pitched; IP = Innings pitched; W = Wins; L = Losses; ERA = Earned run average; SO = Strikeouts

Player	G	IP	W	L	ERA	SO
Dontrelle Willis	35	205.1	10	15	5.17	146
Scott Olsen	33	176.2	10	15	5.81	133
Sergio Mitre	27	149.0	5	8	4.65	80
Byung-Hyun Kim	23	109.2	9	5	5.42	102
Rick VandenHurk	18	81.2	4	6	6.83	82
Aníbal Sánchez	6	30.0	2	1	4.80	14
Ricky Nolasco	5	21.1	1	2	5.48	11
Josh Johnson	4	15.2	0	3	7.47	14

==== Other pitchers ====
Note: G = Games pitched; IP = Innings pitched; W = Wins; L = Losses; ERA = Earned run average; SO = Strikeouts

Player	G	IP	W	L	ERA	SO
Wes Obermueller	18	59.0	2	3	6.56	35
Daniel Barone	16	41.0	1	3	5.71	18
Chris Seddon	7	17.1	0	2	8.83	10

==== Relief pitchers ====
Note: G = Games pitched; W = Wins; L = Losses; SV = Saves; ERA = Earned run average; SO = Strikeouts

Player	G	W	L	SV	ERA	SO
Kevin Gregg	74	0	5	32	3.54	87
Matt Lindstrom	71	3	4	0	3.09	62
Taylor Tankersley	67	6	1	1	3.99	49
Lee Gardner	62	3	4	2	1.94	52
Justin Miller	62	5	0	0	3.65	74
Renyel Pinto	57	2	4	1	3.68	56
Armando Benítez	36	2	5	0	5.73	39
Randy Messenger	23	1	1	0	2.66	12
Henry Owens	22	2	0	4	1.96	16
Ross Wolf	14	0	1	0	11.68	6
Jorge Julio	10	0	2	0	12.54	6
Logan Kensing	9	3	0	0	1.35	13
Harvey García	8	0	1	0	4.38	15
Mauro Zárate	4	0	0	0	10.80	3
Erasmo Ramirez	4	0	0	0	5.40	1
Marcos Carvajal	3	0	0	0	6.75	2
Carlos Martínez	2	0	0	0	13.50	2
Jason Wood	1	0	0	0	0.00	0
Nate Field	1	0	0	0	27.00	2

== Draft ==
This is a partial list. For the full draft, see here.

=== Players selected ===
Round	Pick	Player	Nationality	School
1	12	Matt Dominguez (3B)	United States	Chatsworth High School
2	76	Michael Stanton (CF)	United States	Notre Dame High School
3	106	Jameson Smith (C)	United States	Fresno CC
4	136	Bryan Peterson (RF)	United States	UC-Irvine
5	166	Steven Cishek (RHP)	United States	Carson-Newman College

== Farm system ==
Level	Team	League	Manager
AAA	Albuquerque Isotopes	Pacific Coast League	Dean Treanor
AA	Carolina Mudcats	Southern League	Brandon Hyde
A	Jupiter Hammerheads	Florida State League	Luis Dorante
A	Greensboro Grasshoppers	South Atlantic League	Edwin Rodríguez
A-Short Season	Jamestown Jammers	New York–Penn League	Darin Everson
Rookie	GCL Marlins	Gulf Coast League	Tim Cossins
