= 2006 Florida Marlins season =

2006 Florida Marlins
- League: National League
- Division: East
- Ballpark: Dolphin Stadium
- City: Miami Gardens
- Record: 78–84 (.481)
- Divisional place: 4th
- Owners: Jeffrey Loria
- General managers: Larry Beinfest
- Managers: Joe Girardi
- Television: FSN Florida; WPXM/WPXP (Rich Waltz, Tommy Hutton)
- Radio: WQAM (Dave Van Horne, Roxy Bernstein); WQBA (Spanish) (Felo Ramírez, Luis Quintana)

The 2006 Florida Marlins season was the 14th in Marlins franchise history; an American Major League Baseball team based in Miami Gardens, Florida. They finished the season in fourth place in the National League East. They are notable for greatly exceeding expectations and remaining close in the Wild Card race until September, despite having the lowest payroll in the Major Leagues and using primarily rookies and low priced veterans due to undergoing a fire sale after the 2005 season. They also became the first team in MLB history to be at least 20 games under.500 (11–31), and at any later point in the same season be above.500 (69–68). The team ultimately fell back under.500, and missed the postseason for the third consecutive year. Despite this, their efforts were widely noticed across the league, to the point that manager Joe Girardi won the NL Manager of the Year, the first time a manager of a team with a losing record won the award.

== Offseason ==
- November 24, 2005: Hanley Ramírez was traded by the Boston Red Sox with Jesus Delgado (minors), Harvey Garcia, and Aníbal Sánchez to the Florida Marlins for Josh Beckett, Mike Lowell, and Guillermo Mota.
- November 24, 2005: Carlos Delgado was traded by the Florida Marlins with cash to the New York Mets for Mike Jacobs, Yusmeiro Petit, and Grant Psomas (minors).
- December 5, 2005: Paul Lo Duca was traded by the Florida Marlins to the New York Mets for Dante Brinkley (minors) and Gaby Hernandez (minors).
- December 7, 2005: Juan Pierre was traded by the Florida Marlins to the Chicago Cubs for Sergio Mitre, Ricky Nolasco, and Renyel Pinto.
- December 8, 2005: Dan Uggla was drafted by the Florida Marlins from the Arizona Diamondbacks in the 2005 minor league draft.
- December 15, 2005: Buddy Carlyle was signed as a free agent with the Florida Marlins.
- January 15, 2006: Scott Seabol was signed as a free agent with the Florida Marlins.

== Regular season ==
=== Season standings ===
==== National League East ====
NL East
Team	W	L	Pct.	GB	Home	Road
New York Mets	97	65	.599	—	50‍–‍31	47‍–‍34
Philadelphia Phillies	85	77	.525	12	41‍–‍40	44‍–‍37
Atlanta Braves	79	83	.488	18	40‍–‍41	39‍–‍42
Florida Marlins	78	84	.481	19	42‍–‍39	36‍–‍45
Washington Nationals	71	91	.438	26	41‍–‍40	30‍–‍51

==== Record vs. opponents ====
2006 National League record Source: MLB Standings Grid – 2006
Team	AZ	ATL	CHC	CIN	COL	FLA	HOU	LAD	MIL	NYM	PHI	PIT	SD	SF	STL	WAS	AL
Arizona	—	6–1	4–2	4–2	12–7	2–4	4–5	8–10	3–3	1–6	1–5	5–1	9–10	8–11	4–3	1–5	4–11
Atlanta	1–6	—	6–1	4–3	3–3	11–8	3–4	3–3	2–4	7–11	7–11	3–3	7–2	3–4	4–2	10–8	5–10
Chicago	2–4	1–6	—	10–9	2–4	2–4	7–8	4–2	8–8	3–3	2–5	6–9	0–7	2–4	11–8	2–4	4–11
Cincinnati	2–4	3–4	9–10	—	5–1	4–2	10–5	0–6	9–10	3–4	2–4	9–7	2–4	2–5	9–6	5–1	6-9
Colorado	7–12	3–3	4–2	1–5	—	3–3	4–2	4–15	2–4	1–5	3–4	3–3	10–9	10–8	2–7	8–0	11–4
Florida	4–2	8–11	4–2	2–4	3–3	—	3–4	1–5	7–0	8–11	6–13	5–2	3–3	3–3	1–5	11–7	9–9
Houston	5–4	4–3	8–7	5–10	2–4	4-3	—	3–3	10–5	2–4	2–4	13–3	3–3	1–5	9–7	4–4	7–11
Los Angeles	10–8	3–3	2–4	6–0	15–4	5–1	3–3	—	4–2	3–4	4–3	6–4	5–13	13–6	0–7	4–2	5–10
Milwaukee	3–3	4–2	8–8	10–9	4–2	0–7	5–10	2–4	—	3–3	5–1	7–9	4–3	6–3	7–9	1–5	6–9
New York	6–1	11–7	3–3	4–3	5–1	11–8	4–2	4–3	3–3	—	11–8	5–4	5–2	3–3	4–2	12–6	6–9
Philadelphia	5-1	11–7	5–2	4–2	4–3	13–6	4–2	3–4	1–5	8–11	—	3–3	2–4	5–1	3–3	9–10	5–13
Pittsburgh	1–5	3–3	9–6	7–9	3–3	2–5	3–13	4–6	9–7	4–5	3–3	—	1–5	6–1	6–9	3–3	3–12
San Diego	10–9	2–7	7–0	4–2	9–10	3–3	3–3	13–5	3–4	2–5	4–2	5–1	—	7–12	4–2	5–1	7–8
San Francisco	11–8	4–3	4–2	5–2	8–10	3–3	5–1	6–13	3–6	3–3	1–5	1–6	12–7	—	1–4	1–5	8–7
St. Louis	3–4	2–4	8–11	6–9	7–2	5-1	7–9	7–0	9–7	2–4	3–3	9–6	2–4	4–1	—	4–3	5–10
Washington	5–1	8–10	4–2	1–5	0–8	7-11	4–4	2–4	5–1	6–12	10–9	3–3	1–5	5–1	3–4	—	7–11

=== Transactions ===
- May 18, 2006: Buddy Carlyle was released by the Florida Marlins.
- July 15, 2006: Scott Seabol was released by the Florida Marlins.

=== Roster ===
2006 Florida Marlins
Roster
Pitchers: 48 Joe Borowski; 54 Jeff Fulchino; 58 José García; 62 Franklyn Germán; 49 Matt Herges; 55 Josh Johnson; 16 Logan Kensing; 60 Carlos Martínez; 23 Randy Messenger; 52 Sergio Mitre; 38 Brian Moehler; 47 Ricky Nolasco; 34 Scott Olsen; 45 Yusmeiro Petit; 37 Renyel Pinto; 44 Chris Resop; 36 Aníbal Sánchez; 57 Taylor Tankersley; 56 Jason Vargas; 41 Todd Wellemeyer; 35 Dontrelle Willis	Catchers: 15 Paul Hoover; 30 Miguel Olivo; 20 Matt Treanor; Infielders: 11 Robert Andino; 24 Miguel Cabrera; 18 Wes Helms; 17 Mike Jacobs; 2 Hanley Ramírez; 6 Dan Uggla; 28 Jason Wood	Outfielders: 61 Reggie Abercrombie; 3 Chris Aguila; 4 Alfredo Amézaga; 21 Joe Borchard; 43 Matt Cepicky; 27 Jeremy Hermida; 1 Eric Reed; 12 Cody Ross; 14 Josh Willingham	Manager: 25 Joe Girardi; Coaches: 22 Mike Harkey (bullpen); 7 Perry Hill (first base); 39 Rick Kranitz (pitching); 8 Bobby Meacham (third base); 19 Jim Presley (hitting); 32 Gary Tuck (bench)

== Player stats ==
=== Offense ===
The team hit more home runs than the 2005 Marlins, hitting 182 home runs this season as opposed to 128 home runs the previous year.

=== Batting ===
==== Starters by position ====
Note: Pos = Position; G = Games played; AB = At bats; H = Hits; Avg. = Batting average; HR = Home runs; RBI = Runs batted in

Pos	Player	G	AB	H	Avg.	HR	RBI
C	Miguel Olivo	127	430	113	.263	16	58
1B	Mike Jacobs	136	469	123	.262	20	77
2B	Dan Uggla	154	611	172	.282	27	90
SS	Hanley Ramírez	158	633	185	.292	17	59
3B	Miguel Cabrera	158	576	195	.339	26	114
LF	Josh Willingham	142	502	139	.277	26	74
CF	Reggie Abercrombie	111	255	54	.212	5	24
RF	Jeremy Hermida	99	307	77	.251	5	28

==== Other batters ====
Note: G = Games played; AB = At bats; H = Hits; Avg. = Batting average; HR = Home runs; RBI = Runs batted in

Player	G	AB	H	Avg.	HR	RBI
Alfredo Amézaga	132	334	87	.260	3	19
Cody Ross	91	250	53	.212	11	37
Wes Helms	140	240	79	.329	10	47
Joe Borchard	108	230	53	.230	10	28
Matt Treanor	67	157	36	.229	2	14
Chris Aguila	47	95	22	.232	0	7
Eric Reed	42	41	4	.098	0	0
Robert Andino	11	24	4	.167	0	2
Matthew Cepicky	9	18	2	.111	0	0
Jason Wood	12	13	6	.462	0	1
Paul Hoover	4	5	2	.400	0	1

=== Pitching ===
==== Starting pitchers ====
Note: G = Games pitched; IP = Innings pitched; W = Wins; L = Losses; ERA = Earned run average; SO = Strikeouts

Player	G	IP	W	L	ERA	SO
Dontrelle Willis	34	223.1	12	12	3.87	160
Scott Olsen	31	180.2	12	10	4.04	166
Josh Johnson	31	157.0	12	7	3.10	133
Brian Moehler	29	122.0	7	11	6.57	58
Aníbal Sánchez	18	114.1	10	3	2.83	72

==== Other pitchers ====
Note: G = Games pitched; IP = Innings pitched; W = Wins; L = Losses; ERA = Earned run average; SO = Strikeouts

Player	G	IP	W	L	ERA	SO
Ricky Nolasco	35	140.0	11	11	4.82	99
Jason Vargas	12	43.0	1	2	7.33	25
Sergio Mitre	15	41.0	1	5	5.71	31

===== Relief pitchers =====
Note: G = Games pitched; IP = Innings pitched; W = Wins; L = Losses; SV = Saves; ERA = Earned run average; SO = Strikeouts

Player	G	IP	W	L	SV	ERA	SO
Joe Borowski	72	69.2	3	3	36	3.75	64
Matt Herges	66	71.0	2	3	0	4.31	36
Randy Messenger	59	60.1	2	7	0	5.67	45
Taylor Tankersley	49	41.0	2	1	3	2.85	46
Logan Kensing	37	37.2	1	3	1	4.54	45
Renyel Pinto	27	29.2	0	0	1	3.03	36
Chris Resop	22	21.1	1	2	0	3.38	10
Todd Wellemeyer	18	21.1	0	2	0	5.48	17
Yusmeiro Petit	15	26.1	1	1	0	9.57	20
Franklyn Germán	12	12.0	0	0	0	3.00	6
Carlos Martínez	12	10.1	0	1	0	1.74	11
José García	5	11.0	0	0	0	4.91	8
Jeff Fulchino	1	0.1	0	0	0	0.00	0

== Farm system ==
Level	Team	League	Manager
AAA	Albuquerque Isotopes	Pacific Coast League	Dean Treanor
AA	Carolina Mudcats	Southern League	Luis Dorante
A	Jupiter Hammerheads	Florida State League	Tim Cossins
A	Greensboro Grasshoppers	South Atlantic League	Brandon Hyde
A-Short Season	Jamestown Jammers	New York–Penn League	Bo Porter
Rookie	GCL Marlins	Gulf Coast League	Edwin Rodríguez
