= Kmart (disambiguation) =

Kmart is a major chain of retail stores in the United States.

Kmart may also refer to:

== Brands and enterprises ==
- Kmart Australia - a chain of retail stores in Australia no longer connected with the American chain

== People ==
Kmart is the nickname of:

- Kelvin Martin (American football), an NFL player
- Kenyon Martin, an NBA player
- Kevin Martin (basketball, born 1983), an NBA player
- Kevin Martin (curler), a curler
- Carlos Martínez (pitcher, born 1982), an MLB pitcher

== Other uses ==
- K-Mart, a character in the Resident Evil film series
