= Carlos Martínez (pitcher, born 1982) =

Dominican baseball player (born 1982)

- Pitcher
- Born: May 26, 1982 (age 44); Villa Vasquez, Dominican Republic
- Batted: Right Threw: Right

MLB debut
- April 3, 2006, for the Florida Marlins

Last MLB appearance
- May 16, 2009, for the Florida Marlins

MLB statistics
- Win–loss record: 0–1
- Earned run average: 4.11
- Strikeouts: 15
- Stats at Baseball Reference

Teams
- Florida Marlins (2006–2007, 2009)

Carlos M. Martínez (born May 26, 1982) is a Dominican former relief pitcher in Major League Baseball who played for the Miami Marlins. Marlins' fans nicknamed him K-Mart. Martínez bats and throws right-handed. He made his major league debut on April 3, 2006.

== Playing career ==
The Marlins signed Martínez out of the Dominican Republic in 2000, as an undrafted free agent. He began his professional playing career the following season, at the age of 19, for the Dominican Marlins in the Dominican Summer League. Initially, he was a starting pitcher; he started in 14 of his 15 appearances, accumulating a 4–7 record with a 4.50 ERA.

In 2002, the Marlins converted Martínez into a reliever. In his first season in the United States, he played for the Gulf Coast Marlins, finishing with a record of 1–2, an ERA of 1.11, and seven saves. In 2003, he again played in 3 games for the Gulf Coast Marlins and one for the Jamestown Jammers, but his other 15 games were for the Marlins' South Atlantic League affiliate, the Greensboro Grasshoppers; there, he went 0–3 with a 2.95 ERA and one save. He also spent the whole 2004 season with Greensboro; in 40 games, he went 2–3 with a 3.17 ERA and 6 saves.

Martínez moved to the Jupiter Hammerheads of the High-A Florida State League for the 2005 season. There, he became the team's closer, earning 22 saves to go with a 4–5 record and 3.12 ERA. He was also able to see some time with the Marlins' two top minor-league affiliates; he played in one game for the Double-A Carolina Mudcats, earning the save, and two games for the Triple-A Albuquerque Isotopes.

Martínez started the 2006 season in relative obscurity, since he had played only three games above Single-A prior to that season. However, in spring training, he impressed the Marlins greatly, giving up only one run and two hits in 8 2/3 innings for a 1.04 ERA. As a result, he beat out another hard-throwing young reliever, Travis Bowyer, and former Atlanta Braves closer Kerry Ligtenberg for a spot in the Marlins' bullpen in 2006; both Bowyer and Ligtenberg had been expected to make the team. The Marlins, who fielded a very young team in 2006, started the season with nine rookies on their Opening Day roster, including five players with no major league experience: Martínez, Dan Uggla, Eric Reed, Reggie Abercrombie, and Ricky Nolasco.

Martínez appeared in 12 games with the Marlins in 2006, going 0–1 with a 1.74 ERA in 10 1/3 innings of work. He allowed no home runs, struck out 11 batters, and walked six. His loss came in his first game of the year on April 9. Martínez pitched in three games in four days from April 13 to April 16; he was then placed on the disabled list with an injured elbow and did not play with the Marlins again until June 4. After returning to action, he pitched 3 2/3 scoreless innings over six games. He made his last appearance of the year on June 22, when he allowed one hit, but did not retire any batters. He then went back on the disabled list, having aggravated his elbow injury; the Marlins shut him down for the season shortly afterward so that he could undergo Tommy John surgery. He returned to the Marlins on August 3, 2007, and pitched 1 inning while striking out 1 batter and giving up 2 earned runs.

Martinez was outrighted to Triple-A New Orleans on June 4, 2009, thus taking him off the 40-man roster.

== Pitches ==
Martínez throws a 96 mph four-seam fastball along with a split-finger fastball, a two-seam fastball, and a slider.
