= Noble Meyer =

American baseball player (born 2005)

Miami Marlins
- Pitcher
- Born: January 10, 2005 (age 21); West Linn, Oregon
- Bats: Right Throws: Right

John Noble Meyer (born January 10, 2005) is an American professional baseball pitcher in the Miami Marlins organization.

== Amateur career ==
Meyer grew up in West Linn, Oregon and attended Jesuit High School. He committed to play college baseball at Oregon. Early in his senior season, Meyer and Jesuit High School played in the National High School Invitational, where he pitched a complete game with ten strikeouts. At the end of the season he was named the Oregon Gatorade Player of the Year after striking out 149 batters in 69 innings pitched while also batting .373 with five home runs and 27 RBIs.

Meyer was considered a top prospect for the upcoming MLB draft, with some major outlets considering him the best high school pitcher in the draft.

== Professional career ==
Meyer was drafted 10th overall in the 2023 Major League Baseball draft by the Miami Marlins. On July 20, 2023, Meyer signed with the Marlins for a below slot deal worth $4.5 million.

Meyer made his professional debut after signing with the Florida Complex League Marlins and he also played with the Jupiter Hammerheads, pitching to a 4.09 ERA over 11 innings. He opened the 2024 season with Jupiter and was promoted to the Beloit Snappers during the season. Over 19 games (18 starts) between both teams, Meyer went 2-7 with a 4.01 ERA and 85 strikeouts over 74 innings. He was assigned to Beloit for the 2025 season and made 19 starts in which he went 1-7 with a 4.41 ERA and 72 strikeouts over 65 1/3 innings. Meyer opened the 2026 season on the injured list with a shoulder strain.
