= Henry Owens (right-handed pitcher) =

American baseball player (born 1979)

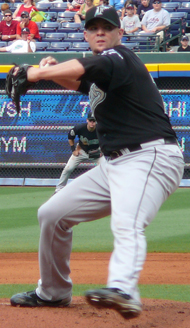
- Owens with the Florida Marlins
- Relief pitcher
- Born: April 23, 1979 (age 47); Miami, Florida, U.S.
- Batted: Right Threw: Right

MLB debut
- July 7, 2006, for the New York Mets

Last MLB appearance
- June 8, 2007, for the Florida Marlins

MLB statistics
- Win–loss record: 2–0
- Earned run average: 3.00
- Strikeouts: 18
- Stats at Baseball Reference

Teams
- New York Mets (2006); Florida Marlins (2007)

Henry Jay Owens (born April 23, 1979 in Miami, Florida) is an American former professional baseball player. A pitcher, Owens played in Major League Baseball for the New York Mets in 2006 and the Florida Marlins in 2007. He bats and throws right-handed.

== Amateur career ==
Owens graduated from G. Holmes Braddock High School in Miami and attended Barry University. He played catcher as an amateur. He planned to attend medical school but scouts noticed his exceptional throwing skills and encouraged him to take up pitching.

== Professional career ==
Owens was signed by the Pittsburgh Pirates as an undrafted free agent in June 2001. In 2004, an elbow injury hampered his performance. As a result, the Pirates left him unprotected and he was selected by the New York Mets in the minor league phase of the Rule 5 Draft.

In 2006, after four years in the Single-A leagues, Owens was promoted to the Double-A Binghamton Mets where he was outstanding as a closer. He compiled 51 strikeouts while allowing only eight hits in 25 innings pitched before his promotion to the major leagues.

He made his major league debut on July 7, 2006, for the New York Mets. He pitched a perfect ninth inning in a 7-3 Mets loss to the Florida Marlins. On November 20, 2006, the Mets traded Owens, along with Matt Lindstrom to the Florida Marlins for lefties Jason Vargas and Adam Bostick.

Owens started the 2007 season as a late-inning reliever, but was looked at as a closing option during spring training. Owens made it clear that he coveted the closer job very early on. After newly acquired reliever Jorge Julio proved to be ineffective as the club's closer, Owens became a candidate for the closer role.

On May 11, Owens was placed on the disabled list with right shoulder rotator cuff tendinitis. Owens was activated from the disabled list on June 1, 2007, and made five more appearances before being shut down, and ultimately undergoing shoulder surgery on August 30.

Owens did not pitch at all in 2008, and in November was handed a 50-game suspension after testing positive for a banned substance.

In 2009, he pitched in 3 games for the Jupiter Hammerheads, allowing 1 run in 4 innings, and 8 for the Jacksonville Suns, throwing 9 2/3 scoreless innings but walking 10 batters compared to 8 strikeouts. Owens was again placed on the injured list with right shoulder inflammation on July 30, and did not return to the mound that season. He elected free agency on November 9. After struggling in 5 appearances for the Indios de Mayaguez that winter, Owens' professional career came to an unceremonious end.
