= Reggie Abercrombie =

American baseball player (born 1980)

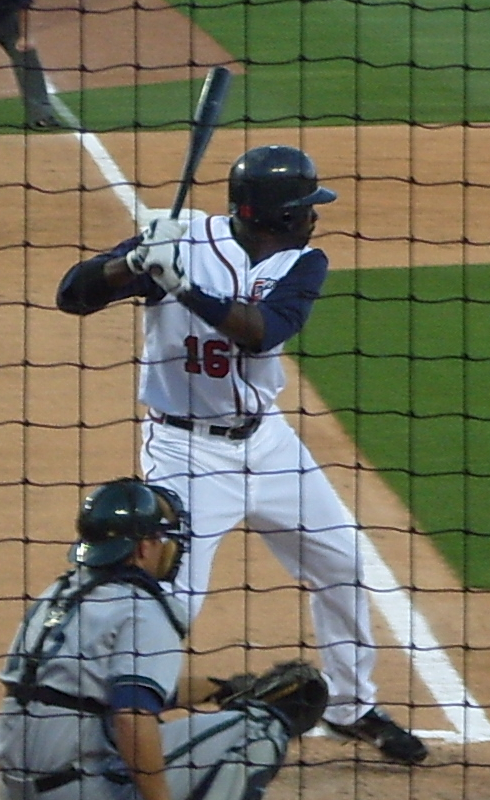
- Abercrombie batting for the Round Rock Express, Triple-A affiliates of the Houston Astros, in 2008.
- Outfielder
- Born: July 15, 1980 (age 46); Columbus, Georgia, U.S.
- Batted: Right Threw: Right

MLB debut
- April 4, 2006, for the Florida Marlins

Last appearance
- September 28, 2008, for the Houston Astros

MLB statistics
- Batting average: .223
- Home runs: 9
- Runs batted in: 34
- Stats at Baseball Reference

Teams
- Florida Marlins (2006–2007); Houston Astros (2008)

Reginald Damascus Abercrombie (born July 15, 1980) is an American former professional baseball outfielder. He played in Major League Baseball (MLB) for the Florida Marlins and Houston Astros.

== Professional career ==
Abercrombie graduated from Columbus High School. He was selected by the Los Angeles Dodgers in the 23rd round of the 1999 Major League Baseball draft, but chose to attend Florida Gateway College in Florida during the 1999–2000 school year and signed on May 24, 2000. Abercrombie was later dealt to the Arizona Diamondbacks at the trade deadline in 2004 and claimed off waivers by the Florida Marlins on April 6, 2005. After a strong spring training one year later in 2006, where he batted .358 with a .394 on-base percentage and a .627 slugging percentage, the Florida Marlins called him up to the big club.

His ascent to the majors was somewhat surprising, considering he had only had brief stints above Single-A ball. Though once viewed as a marginal prospect, the Marlins had high hopes for him. In 2006, he joined a rookie cast that included Hanley Ramírez, Dan Uggla, Jeremy Hermida, Josh Johnson, Josh Willingham, Eric Reed, Mike Jacobs, and Scott Olsen, a group that overperformed considering the meager expectations which were placed on them due to the frugal nature of Marlins owner Jeffrey Loria. Abercrombie had some high points, but overall he did not stick as a starter for the Marlins in 2006 and ended up with only 281 plate appearances, a batting average of .212, an on-base percentage of .271, and a slugging percentage of .333, all well below the league averages.

Though he never materialized into a consistent option for the Marlins, on April 19, 2006, while playing against the Cincinnati Reds at the Great American Ball Park, Abercrombie, facing pitcher Mike Gosling, hit a home run 486 feet, according to Hit Tracker Online's Standard Distance (considered "the best way of comparing home runs hit under a variety of different conditions" by the website). This home run was the furthest recorded distance of any home run since Hit Tracker had kept track of HR distances, until on September 27, 2008, Adam Dunn of the Arizona Diamondbacks hit a home run of Standard Distance 501 feet.

In the 2007 season, Abercrombie saw less time in the majors and again slumped at the plate, with a .197 batting average, .238 on-base percentage, and .316 slugging percentage in 80 plate appearances. He spent most of the season with the Triple-A Albuquerque Isotopes where he hit very well, with a .323 batting average, .361 on-base percentage, and .584 slugging percentage in 379 plate appearances.

=== Houston Astros ===
On October 11, 2007, the Houston Astros claimed him off waivers from the Marlins. He was sent outright to the minors on March 28, 2008. On June 7, his contract was purchased and he was added to the active roster. He was designated for assignment almost one month later on July 6. After being sent outright to the minors, he was recalled by the Astros again on August 9. Although he only got 60 plate appearances in the major leagues, he had fairly good statistics in his time there, finishing the season with a .309 batting average and a .509 slugging percentage. On January 5, 2009, he re-signed with the Houston Astros. He spent the entire 2009 campaign with Houston's AAA Round Rock club, slashing .271/.312/.412 with 11 HR, and was granted free agency on November 9, 2009.

=== Independent ball ===
Abercrombie joined the American Association of Independent Professional Baseball in 2010, signing a contract with the Sioux Falls Fighting Pheasants. He was a popular player in Sioux Falls due to his help in leading the Pheasants to the 2010 American Association Championship Series, and he made the American Association All-Star Game. In total he recorded 22 home runs with 90 RBI and a .328 average. In 2011, Abercrombie posted a .304 average with 17 home runs and 66 RBI.

Abercrombie spent much of the 2012 and 2013 seasons splitting time between Sioux Falls and the Mexican League. In 2012, he hit a combined .293 with 17 HR and 67 RBI for the Pheasants and Tigres de Quintana Roo. 2013 saw Abercrombie record a statline of .292/18/73 playing for Pericos de Puebla, Olmecas de Tabasco, and the renamed Sioux Falls Canaries.

Abercrombie joined the Winnipeg Goldeyes for the 2014 season and hit .284 in 398 at bats with 15 home runs and 74 RBI. On February 9, 2015, he was traded by the Goldeyes to the Sussex County Miners of the Canadian-American Association in exchange for cash and a player to be named later. He made three stops overall in 2015, playing with Sussex County, the Winnipeg Goldeyes of the American Association and the Southern Maryland Blue Crabs of the Atlantic League.

In addition to his minor league and major league experience, Abercrombie has played for teams in the Arizona Fall League, the Mexican Pacific League, the Puerto Rican Winter League, and the Dominican Winter League.

On December 7, 2015, it was announced that Abercrombie would be back with the Goldeyes for the 2016 season. Abercrombie then went on to help the Goldeyes win each of the next two league championships. He retired following the 2019 season.

On August 11, 2023, the Winnipeg Goldeyes retired his number 11.
