= Matt Lindstrom =

American baseball player (born 1980)

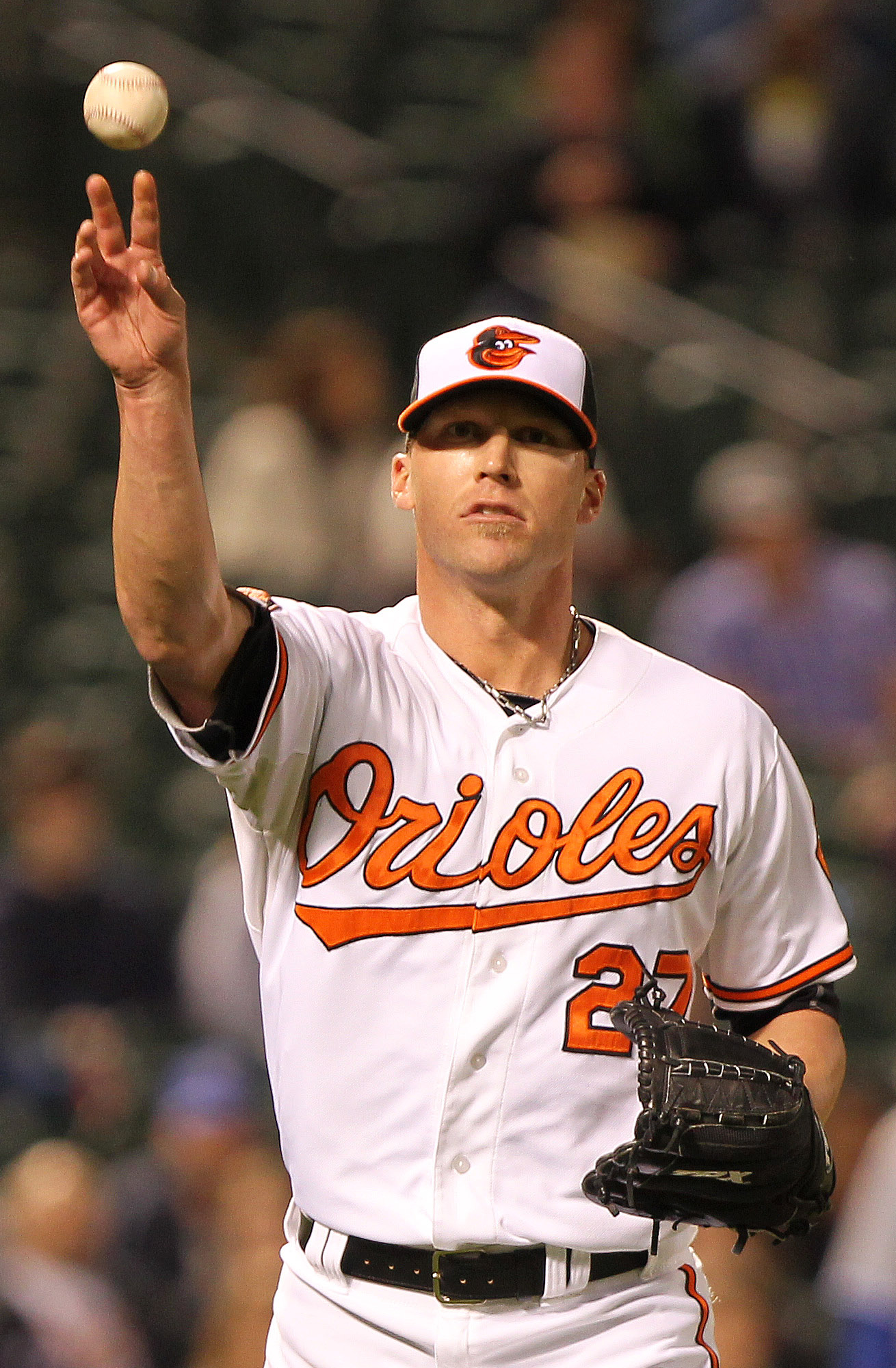
- Lindstrom with the Baltimore Orioles
- Pitcher
- Born: February 11, 1980 (age 46); Rexburg, Idaho, U.S.
- Batted: Right Threw: Right

MLB debut
- April 4, 2007, for the Florida Marlins

Last MLB appearance
- September 26, 2014, for the Chicago White Sox

MLB statistics
- Win–loss record: 17–21
- Earned run average: 3.68
- Strikeouts: 327
- Stats at Baseball Reference

Teams
- Florida Marlins (2007–2009); Houston Astros (2010); Colorado Rockies (2011); Baltimore Orioles (2012); Arizona Diamondbacks (2012); Chicago White Sox (2013–2014)

Matthew Raymond Lindstrom (born February 11, 1980) is an American former professional baseball pitcher. He played in Major League Baseball (MLB) for the Florida Marlins, Houston Astros, Colorado Rockies, Baltimore Orioles, Arizona Diamondbacks, and Chicago White Sox.

== College career ==
Lindstrom played college baseball at Ricks College (now BYU-Idaho).

== Professional career ==
=== New York Mets ===
Lindstrom was selected by the New York Mets in the 10th round of the 2002 MLB draft. He made his professional debut at Rookie League Kingsport and posted an 0–6 record with a 4.84 ERA in twelve games with eleven games as a starting pitcher. He began next year at Single-A Capital City and was dominant, as his 2.86 ERA and 7.94 K/9 rate showed. This earned him a promotion to Brooklyn where Lindstrom would finish out the 2003 season well, as he compiled a 7–3 record with a 3.44 ERA.

In 2004, Lindstrom was promoted to St. Lucie where, at 24, he compiled a 5–5 record with a 3.73 ERA in fourteen starts. His walk rate was staggering, however, at 2.26 BB/9. The righty found himself back at Capital City midway through the season, where his numbers improved slightly, as he posted a 3–2 record with a 3.21 ERA and much-improved control, with a 1.61 BB/9.

At age 25, Lindstrom began the 2005 season at Double-A Binghamton, in what was determined to be a make-or-break year for his career. Lindstrom went 2–5 with an ERA of 5.40 with eye-popping walk and home run rates of 6.75 BB/9 and 1.35 HR/9 in thirty-five games (ten starts, as the troubled righty was switched to bullpen duty midway through the season).

=== Florida Marlins ===
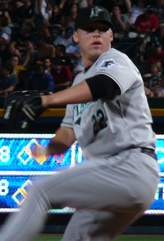
Lindstrom pitching for the Florida Marlins in June 2007

On November 20, 2006, Lindstrom and Henry Owens were traded to the Florida Marlins in exchange for Jason Vargas and Adam Bostick. Both Lindstrom and Owens were highly regarded as a top closer candidates for the 2007 season. Lindstrom's fastball often touches 100 mph and averages in the high 90's. Playing in the Puerto Rican Winter League in the 06-07 offseason, his fastball was clocked at 102 mph.

On May 17, 2007, while pitching in the 8th inning against the Pittsburgh Pirates at PNC Park, Lindstrom's fastball was clocked at 102 mph on the stadium scoreboard.

Lindstrom picked up his first MLB win against the Brewers in Milwaukee on June 2, 2007.

In the final game of the 2008 regular season, Lindstrom earned a save versus the New York Mets. He threw the final pitch during actual game-play of Shea Stadium (Tom Seaver would throw a "final pitch" during the post-game activities).

=== Houston Astros ===
On December 9, 2009, Lindstrom was dealt to the Houston Astros for minor leaguers Robert Bono, Luis Bryan and a player to be named later, which became Rule 5 draft pick Jorge Jimenez, a third baseman selected from the Red Sox organization. On March 30, 2010, Lindstrom was named the Astros' closer for the 2010 season.

=== Colorado Rockies ===
After the 2010 season, Lindstrom was traded to the Colorado Rockies for two minor league pitchers: Wes Musick and Jonnathan Aristil.

=== Baltimore Orioles ===
On February 6, 2012, Lindstrom was traded with Jason Hammel to the Baltimore Orioles for starter Jeremy Guthrie. He had early success, not giving up an earned run on the season until May 10, the day before he was placed on the disabled list with an injury to his right middle finger. He began his minor league rehab assignment on June 22. Lindstrom returned on June 27 and had a 2.72 ERA on the season when he was dealt to the Arizona Diamondbacks.

=== Arizona Diamondbacks ===
On August 26, 2012, Lindstrom was traded to the Arizona Diamondbacks for Joe Saunders.

On November 1, 2012, Lindstrom's option was declined by the Arizona Diamondbacks.

=== Chicago White Sox ===
On January 19, 2013, Lindstrom was signed to a 1-year deal by the Chicago White Sox with a 2014 option. His 2014 option was picked up on October 31, 2013, which was worth $4 million. He became a free agent following the 2014 season.

=== Los Angeles Angels of Anaheim ===
On February 17, 2015, Lindstrom signed a minor league contract with the Los Angeles Angels of Anaheim. He was released by the Angels on March 28.

=== Chicago White Sox (second stint) ===
On April 2, 2015, he signed a minor league deal with the Chicago White Sox. On April 9, 2015, he was assigned to AAA Charlotte Knights. He was later released on July 10.

== International career ==
Lindstrom was selected for the Team USA at the 2009 World Baseball Classic.
