= Mauro Zárate (baseball) =

Venezuelan baseball player (born 1983)

- Relief pitcher
- Born: February 8, 1983 (age 43); Valencia, Venezuela
- Batted: Right Threw: Right

MLB debut
- August 7, 2007, for the Florida Marlins

Last MLB appearance
- September 29, 2007, for the Florida Marlins

MLB statistics
- Win–loss record: 0-0
- Earned run average: 10.80
- Strikeouts: 3
- Stats at Baseball Reference

Teams
- Florida Marlins (2007)

Mauro Edward Zárate (born February 8, 1983) is a Venezuelan former professional baseball pitcher.

== Career ==
He pitched one season in Major League Baseball (MLB) for the Florida Marlins in 2007.

Zárate was called up on August 3, 2007, by the Marlins and played his first game on August 7 against the Philadelphia Phillies. On October 26, 2007, Zárate was claimed off waivers by the San Diego Padres from the Marlins. He became a free agent at the end of the 2008 season and signed a minor league contract with the Cleveland Indians, but never pitched in their organization.

== See also ==
- List of Major League Baseball players from Venezuela
