= Daniel Barone (baseball) =

American baseball player (born 1983)

- Pitcher
- Born: April 24, 1983 (age 43); San Jose, California, U.S.
- Batted: Right Threw: Right

MLB debut
- August 10, 2007, for the Florida Marlins

Last MLB appearance
- September 26, 2007, for the Florida Marlins

MLB statistics
- Win–loss record: 1–3
- Earned run average: 5.71
- Strikeouts: 18
- Stats at Baseball Reference

Teams
- Florida Marlins (2007)

Daniel Edward Barone (born April 24, 1983) is an American former Major League Baseball pitcher. Barone attended Sonoma State University, an NCAA Division II school in Rohnert Park, California. He was an 11th-round selection of the Marlins in the 2004 Major League Baseball draft.

== Career ==
He was called up on August 10, 2007, to become the fifth starting pitcher in the Florida Marlins rotation, filling the empty spot after Florida sent Byung-hyun Kim to the Arizona Diamondbacks on waivers. He went to the bullpen when the Diamondbacks released Kim, and the Marlins picked him back up. Barone became a free agent at the end of the season.

On June 25, 2009, Barone signed a minor league contract with the Oakland Athletics. He pitched to a 2–8 record with a 6.55 earned run average in 17 games that year between two teams in the A's minor league system and retired after the season.

Barone joined the Kansas City T-Bones of the American Association of Independent Professional Baseball and played for them during the 2014 season.

== High school life ==
During high school Daniel Barone attended San Benito High School in Hollister, California. He was a stand-out pitcher for the Balers. On top of this he was also the shortstop at the high school, but would get designated hit for when it was his turn to bat. Though he was still able to hit as he does have a batting average as a major league pitcher. He hit .111 in his career. He had 11 plate appearances, 9 at bats, 1 hit, no base on balls or hit by pitch, 2 sacrifice bunts, and 1 run scored. After high school he had several scholarships, but took the one from Sonoma State.

== Family history in baseball ==
Barone's grandfather played in three games for the Pittsburgh Pirates during the 1960 season.
