= Scott Olsen =

American baseball player

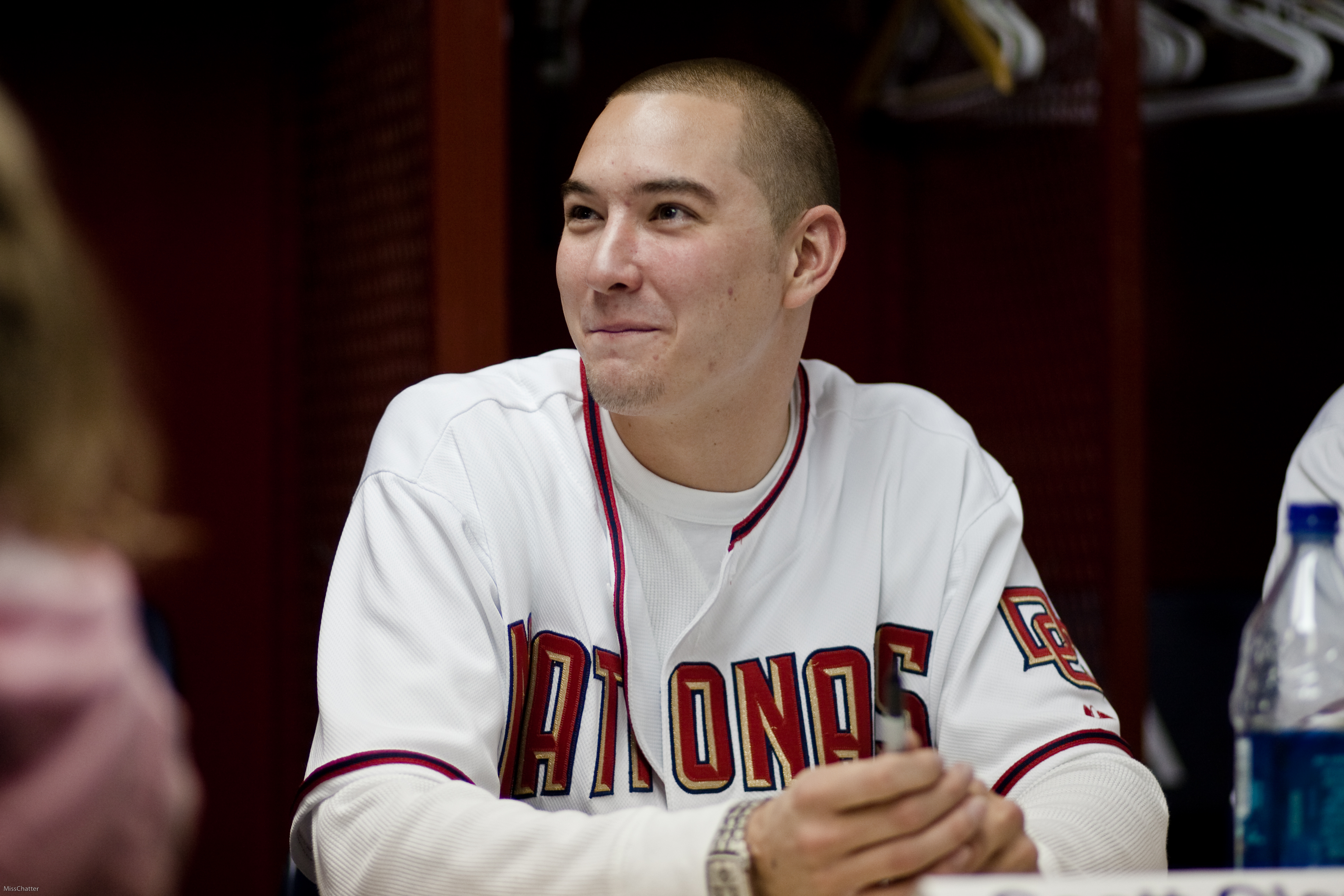
- Olsen with the Washington Nationals
- Pitcher
- Born: January 12, 1984 (age 42); Kalamazoo, Michigan, U.S.
- Batted: Left Threw: Left

MLB debut
- June 25, 2005, for the Florida Marlins

Last MLB appearance
- September 17, 2010, for the Washington Nationals

MLB statistics
- Win–loss record: 37–49
- Earned run average: 4.85
- Strikeouts: 528
- Stats at Baseball Reference

Teams
- Florida Marlins (2005–2008); Washington Nationals (2009–2010)

Scott Matthew Olsen (born January 12, 1984) is an American former Major League Baseball pitcher. He played for the Florida Marlins and Washington Nationals between 2005 and 2010.

== Early life ==
Olsen was born in Kalamazoo, Michigan. He attended Crystal Lake South High School in Crystal Lake, Illinois, for high school where he was all-conference in baseball. He was drafted 173rd overall during the sixth round of the 2002 Major League Baseball draft by the Florida Marlins.

== MLB career ==
=== Florida Marlins ===
==== 2005 season ====
Olsen played his first season in the MLB in 2005 with the Florida Marlins. The team activated him on June 25, 2005, when pitcher Josh Beckett went on the disabled list. Olsen had one win and one loss in five starts, with a 3.98 ERA during the season, but was also later sent to the disabled list with an elbow injury.

==== 2006 season ====
During the 2006 season with the Florida Marlins, Olsen went 12–10 with a 4.04 ERA. With his 10+ wins and the 10+ wins of his fellow rookies Josh Johnson, Ricky Nolasco and Aníbal Sánchez, the 2006 Marlins became the first team in Major League Baseball history with four rookie pitchers with ten or more wins in one season.

With his 166 strikeouts in 2006, Olsen held the single-season record for the most strikeouts by a Marlins rookie until it was broken in 2013 by José Fernandez. He had two 10-or-more strikeout games: 11 vs. the Pittsburgh Pirates on July 27 and 10 vs. the New York Mets on August 1. His 11-strikeout performance against Pittsburgh was the most by any Marlins pitcher during the 2006 season.

==== 2007 season ====
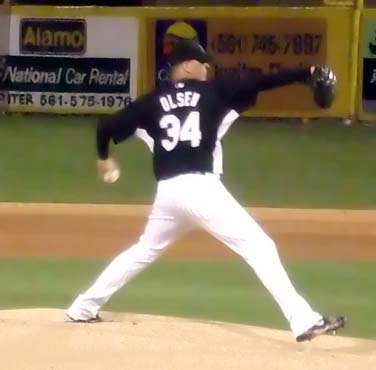
Olsen pitching for the Marlins on February 27, 2007.

As a hitter, Olsen began the 2007 season 6-for-14 with two runs batted in.

Olsen finished the season with a 10–15 record and a 5.81 ERA, the latter of which was the worst among qualified starters in the majors. He had 133 strikeouts in 176 2/3 innings. He was tied with two other Marlins starters for the most wins during the season. His .384 OBP-against was also the highest in the majors, as was his .315 batting-average-against and .504 slugging-percentage-against.

==== 2008 season ====
With the departure of Dontrelle Willis, Olsen admitted to reporters that he coveted the "pitching ace" role. However, Ricky Nolasco put himself in that role with a break-out season. Olsen's 13 intentional walks given up for the season were the most in the majors.

=== Washington Nationals ===
On November 11, 2008, he was traded with left fielder Josh Willingham to the Washington Nationals for second baseman Emilio Bonifacio, and minor leaguers right-hander P.J. Dean, and infielder Jake Smolinski.

Shoulder tendinitis forced Olsen to miss about a month and a half, from May 16 to June 29.

Olsen missed the rest of the season following a diagnosis of a left labrum tear following a mid-July start. Surgery to repair the labrum was performed on July 23, 2009.

On December 12, 2009, Olsen, was non-tendered a contract by the Washington Nationals, making him a free agent.

On December 13. 2009 Olsen, re-signed with the Washington Nationals for 1 year at $1 million.

In 2010 Olsen started in the minors, but after one Triple–A start, he was called up. In early May he took a no-hitter into the eighth inning against the Atlanta Braves. The game took place amidst a five-game streak where Olsen went 2–0 with a 1.11 ERA. On May 21, he experienced stiffness in his left shoulder that forced him to the disabled list.

On November 6, 2010, Olsen was outrighted by the Nationals, and elected free agency.

=== Pittsburgh Pirates ===
On December 6, 2010, Olsen tentatively agreed to a one-year, incentive-laden agreement with the Pittsburgh Pirates. He was released on May 14, 2011.

=== Chicago White Sox ===
On January 27, 2012, Olsen signed a minor league contract with the Chicago White Sox. The deal included a major league option for 2013. He was released on July 7.

=== Texas Rangers ===
On November 12, 2012, Olsen signed a minor league contract with the Texas Rangers organization. He became a free agent following the season.
