= Lee Gardner =

American baseball player (born 1975)

- Pitcher
- Born: January 16, 1975 (age 51); Hartland, Michigan, U.S.
- Batted: Right Threw: Right

MLB debut
- May 24, 2002, for the Tampa Bay Devil Rays

Last MLB appearance
- April 17, 2008, for the Florida Marlins

MLB statistics
- Win–loss record: 4–5
- Earned run average: 3.01
- Strikeouts: 68
- Stats at Baseball Reference

Teams
- Tampa Bay Devil Rays (2002, 2005); Florida Marlins (2007–2008)

Terrence Lee Gardner (born January 16, 1975) is an American former Major League Baseball pitcher. In 2002, Gardner made his Major League Baseball debut with the Tampa Bay Devil Rays; he also played five games with the Devil Rays in 2005. Gardner spent the 2006 season with the Toledo Mud Hens, the Triple-A affiliate of the Detroit Tigers. He split the 2007 season between the Triple-A Albuquerque Isotopes and the Marlins. Gardner pitched in 62 games with the Marlins in 2007, going 3–4 with a 1.94 ERA. He retired after the 2008 season.
