= Taylor Tankersley =

American baseball player

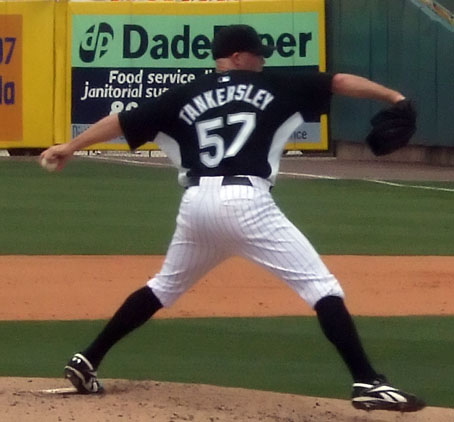
- Tankersley with the Florida Marlins
- Relief pitcher
- Born: March 7, 1983 (age 43); Missoula, Montana, U.S.
- Batted: Left Threw: Left

MLB debut
- June 3, 2006, for the Florida Marlins

Last MLB appearance
- August 16, 2010, for the Florida Marlins

MLB statistics
- Win–loss record: 8–3
- Earned run average: 4.58
- Strikeouts: 115
- Stats at Baseball Reference

Teams
- Florida Marlins (2006–2008, 2010)

Taylor Mark Tankersley (born March 7, 1983) is an American former professional baseball pitcher. He played in Major League Baseball (MLB) for the Florida Marlins.

== Career ==
=== Amateur ===
During his senior year at Warren Central High School in Vicksburg, Tankersley went 13–0. He also played first base whenever he was not pitching. Warren Central won the Mississippi 5A Baseball State Championship that year. After high school, Tankersley continued his baseball career at the University of Alabama. He started and did relief work for the Crimson Tide. In 2002, he played collegiate summer baseball with the Brewster Whitecaps of the Cape Cod Baseball League and was named a league all-star.

=== Florida Marlins ===
After three years throwing for the Tide, Tankersley was a first rounder in the 2004 major league draft. The 27th pick overall, Taylor was the Marlins' first pick. He made his major league debut on June 3, 2006, pitching a scoreless inning in relief.

In March 2009 Tankersley was demoted to the Marlin's Triple-A New Orleans Zephyrs team due to an elbow injury, ultimately undergoing surgery to correct the recurring stress fracture. In May 2010, Tankersley was called up by the Marlins to work as a "Lefty specialist" out of the bullpen. 20 of the first 21 left-handed hitters Tankersley faced were retired; he finished the season "shutting down" lefties, who batted just .200 against him.

On October 13, 2010, Tankersley refused a minor league assignment and became a free agent.

=== New York Mets ===
On January 11, 2011, Tankersley reached a minor league deal with the New York Mets, which included an invite to spring training. He would spend the entire 2011 season with the AAA Buffalo Bisons where he would compile a 1–1 record with a 5.79 ERA in 56 innings pitched.
