= Josh Johnson (pitcher) =

Canadian-American baseball player (born 1984)

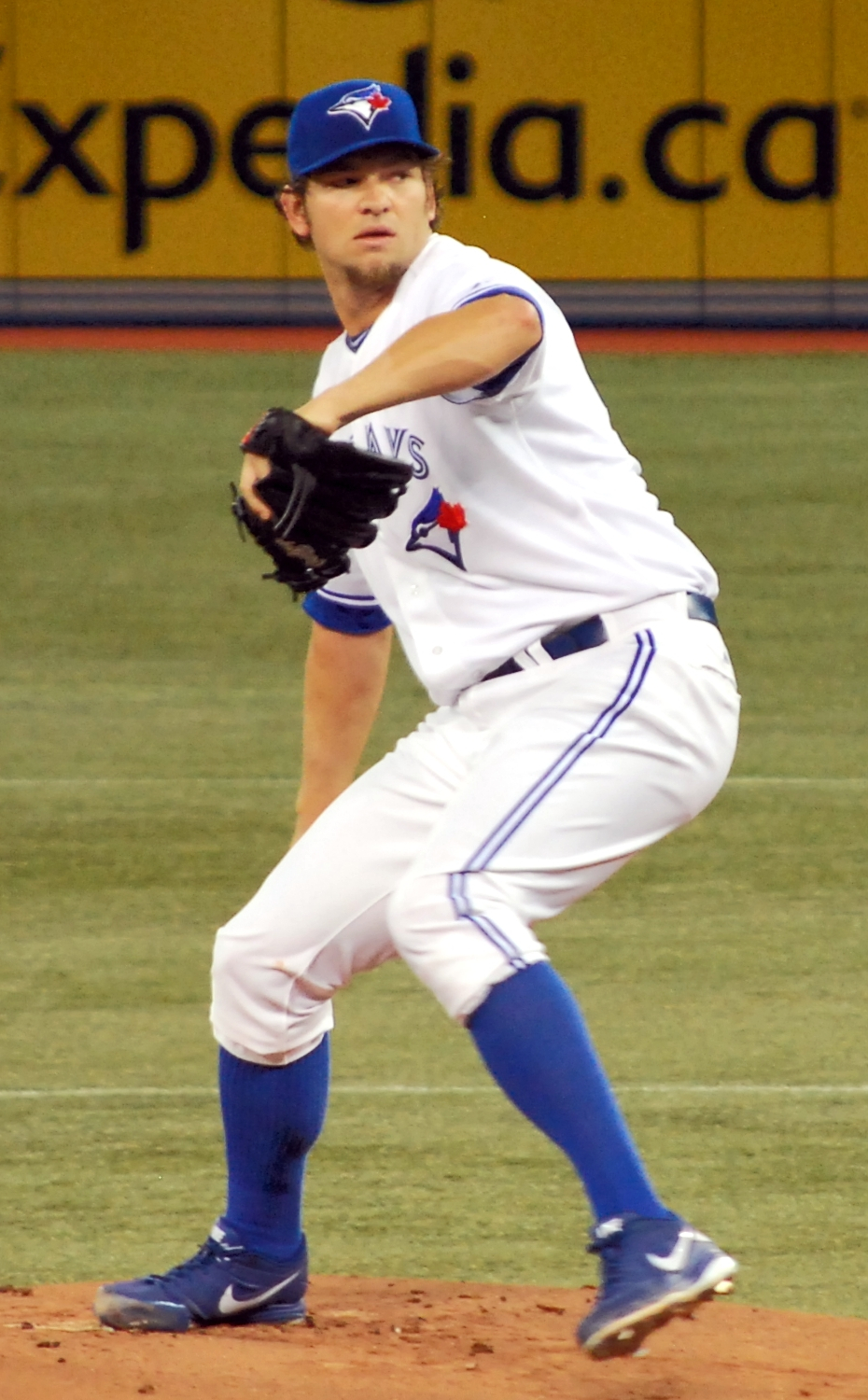
- Johnson with the Blue Jays in 2013
- Pitcher
- Born: January 31, 1984 (age 42); Minneapolis, Minnesota, U.S.
- Batted: Left Threw: Right

MLB debut
- September 10, 2005, for the Florida Marlins

Last MLB appearance
- August 6, 2013, for the Toronto Blue Jays

MLB statistics
- Win–loss record: 58–45
- Earned run average: 3.40
- Strikeouts: 915
- Stats at Baseball Reference

Teams
- Florida / Miami Marlins (2005–2012); Toronto Blue Jays (2013)

Career highlights and awards
- 2× All-Star (2009, 2010); NL ERA leader (2010)

Joshua Michael Johnson (born January 31, 1984), nicknamed "JJ", is an American former professional baseball pitcher. He played in Major League Baseball (MLB) for the Florida/Miami Marlins and Toronto Blue Jays from 2005 through 2013.

== Early career ==
Johnson graduated from Jenks High School in Jenks, Oklahoma in 2002, when he was Tulsa World All-Metro Player of the Year. He helped lead the Trojans to two State Championships during his high school career. Johnson signed a letter of intent to play college baseball for the Oklahoma Sooners, for whom his brother, Tyler, also played. Johnson was drafted by the Marlins in the fourth round of the 2002 MLB draft. The righty made his professional baseball debut soon after with the Gulf Coast Marlins, earning a 0.60 earned run average (ERA) over 15 innings.

As a starter with the Single-A Greensboro Grasshoppers during the 2003 season, Johnson continued to limit his opponents' offensive numbers, collecting a paltry .223 opponent batting average. In 2004, he saw more success with the Single-A Jupiter Hammerheads. Despite a 5–12 record, Johnson's ERA remained a solid 3.46.

Johnson's performance at the Single-A level earned Johnson a promotion to the Double-A Carolina Mudcats in 2005. He was named the Marlins' Minor League Pitcher of the Year after a 12–4 record, a 3.87 ERA and a Southern League All-Star nod for Carolina.

== Major League career ==
=== Florida/Miami Marlins (2005–2012) ===
Johnson made his major league debut September 10, 2005, for the Marlins with a scoreless inning of relief against the Philadelphia Phillies. During the 2006 season, Johnson broke onto the Major League scene by going 11–5 as a starter, while tallying a 3.03 ERA in that role. After spending all of April in the Florida bullpen, Johnson emerged as a major contributor in the Marlins' young, but surprisingly successful, starting staff. In 2006 Johnson and fellow Marlin pitchers Scott Olsen, Aníbal Sánchez and Ricky Nolasco became the first quartet of rookie pitchers in major league history to each record 10 wins. He sat out the final three weeks of the season with forearm stiffness. His 3.10 overall ERA would have tied him for third in the National League, but he fell five innings short of qualifying for the title. Johnson also placed fourth in voting for the National League Rookie of the Year, an award that went to his fellow Florida teammate, shortstop Hanley Ramírez.

Johnson began the 2007 season on the disabled list with an irritated ulnar nerve. After returning in June, he was again sidelined by elbow stiffness in July and had Tommy John ligament-replacement surgery on August 3, 2007. He recovered surprisingly quickly and made his return to the Major Leagues on July 10, 2008, only eleven months after having undergone surgery. He made 14 starts in 2008, posting a 3.61 ERA.

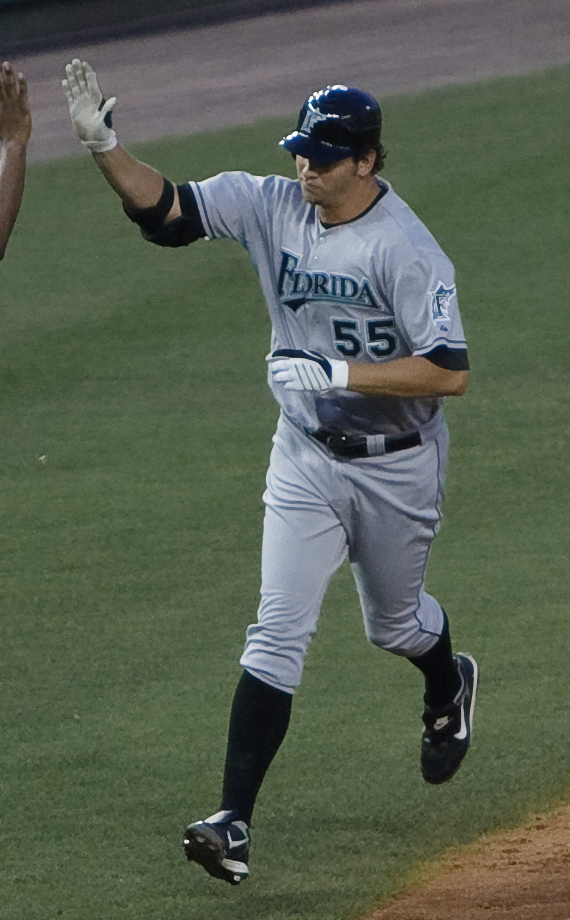
Johnson running bases after hitting a home run for the Florida Marlins in 2009

Johnson hit his first career home run off of Milwaukee's Dave Bush on June 4, 2009. On July 5, 2009, Johnson was selected to the National League All-Star squad for the first time but did not play in the game. On August 14, Johnson took a no-hitter into the 7th inning against the Colorado Rockies, but it was broken up by a Garrett Atkins home run. He finished 2009 with a 15-5 record and a 3.23 ERA with 191 strike-outs in 209 innings.

On January 15, 2010, Johnson agreed to a four-year contract with the Marlins worth $39 million.

On May 29, 2010, Johnson lost to the Phillies 1–0, as Roy Halladay threw a perfect game.

In July 2010, he was selected to his second consecutive All-Star Game, which took place in Anaheim. Johnson pitched two perfect innings in the game, notably striking out Derek Jeter and Ichiro Suzuki. 2010 was also a record-setting year for Johnson, who gave up three runs or less in twelve consecutive starts. On July 28, Johnson had started 21 games, and in those starts, only allowed more than three earned runs once, giving up only one earned run eight times and no earned runs six times.

Johnson finished the 2010 season second in the Majors in ERA (2.30), leading the National League, trailing only Félix Hernández of Seattle. He finished 11–6 with 186 strikeouts in 28 starts, his year shortened by back pain. He made his final start of the season on September 4 against Atlanta.

At the beginning of the 2011 year Johnson kept a no-hitter at least to the fifth inning four out of the first five times he took the mound. The high point was the game against the Atlanta Braves in which Johnson went into the eighth without giving up a hit until Braves hitter Freddie Freeman legged out a broken bat single. Johnson's 2011 season ended after nine starts due to right shoulder inflammation. He finished the season with a 3–1 record and a 1.64 ERA.

In 2012, Johnson was named the Opening Day starter for the Marlins for the third straight year, although he was coming off from a shoulder inflammation injury. On April 4, 2012, Johnson pitched 6 innings against Kyle Lohse and the St. Louis Cardinals in the Marlin's first game in Marlins Park. Johnson finished his last season with Miami with an 8–14 record and an ERA of 3.81.

=== Toronto Blue Jays (2013) ===
On November 19, 2012, Johnson was traded to the Toronto Blue Jays along with Mark Buehrle, José Reyes, John Buck, and Emilio Bonifacio, in exchange for Jeff Mathis, Adeiny Hechavarria, Henderson Álvarez, Yunel Escobar, Jake Marisnick, Anthony DeSclafani, and Justin Nicolino. On February 5, 2013, manager John Gibbons named Johnson the number 4 starter for the upcoming season. Johnson made 4 starts for the Blue Jays before missing a start on April 26, due to a sore right triceps muscle. He was expected to make his next scheduled start but was instead placed on the disabled list due to inflammation. Ricky Romero was called up to take his place in the starting lineup. He had one rehab start for the Class-A Dunedin Blue Jays before being moved to the Triple-A Buffalo Bisons for his second rehab start on May 25. This was his debut at the Triple-A level, as he had skipped that level while in the Marlins' organization.

On May 31, the Blue Jays announced that Johnson would be activated from the disabled list and start against the San Francisco Giants on June 4. Johnson pitched 7 innings in his return from the disabled list and took the loss, allowing 2 runs (only 1 earned run), with no walks and 6 strikeouts. Johnson earned his first win as a Blue Jay on June 23 against the Baltimore Orioles, which extended the Jays' winning streak to 11 games, tying the franchise record. After earning his first win, Johnson lost 6 consecutive starts, the longest such streak of his career. During his losing streak, his ERA rose from 4.60 to a career-high 6.60. Johnson earned his second win of the season on August 6, against the Seattle Mariners, in what would turn out to be his final major league game.

Johnson was scratched from his scheduled next start on August 12 due to forearm tightness, and was placed on the 15-day disabled list on August 13. Johnson finished the 2013 season on the disabled list, and posted a dismal 2–8 record, a 6.20 earned run average, and 83 strikeouts over 81 1/3 innings. On October 1, 2013, Johnson underwent surgery to remove bone spurs from his right elbow. The surgery was performed by Dr. James Andrews and required 5 weeks of recovery.

=== San Diego Padres ===
On November 19, 2013, Johnson agreed to a one-year, $8 million contract with the San Diego Padres. If he made fewer than 7 starts with the team, they could have exercised a $4 million option for the 2015 season. The Padres organization reported on March 22, 2014, that Johnson would open the season on the disabled list due to a strained right forearm/elbow muscle, and was initially expected to miss at least 4–5 weeks. On April 15, it was announced that he would see Dr. James Andrews for a consultation on his injured elbow, and could opt for his second Tommy John surgery. The Padres reported on April 23 that Johnson would undergo Tommy John surgery, and miss the 2014 season. On October 30, the Padres declined Johnson's option, making him a free agent. On January 7, 2015, he re-signed with the Padres on a one-year contract with $1 million guaranteed. Johnson threw a simulated game on April 28, but experienced triceps tightness as well as a nerve issue in his neck. He would rest with these injuries until August 27, when he threw 16 pitches in another simulated game. On September 16, it was announced that Johnson would undergo a third Tommy John surgery, and miss the entire 2016 season.

=== Retirement ===
Attempting another comeback from Tommy John surgery, Johnson signed a minor league contract with the San Francisco Giants on November 1, 2016. However, he announced his retirement on January 19, 2017.

== Personal life ==
His father is Canadian, and his mother is Native American. His father spent his years growing up in Calgary, Alberta before the family relocated to the U.S. Johnson himself was born in Minneapolis a short time later in 1984.

== See also ==
- List of Major League Baseball annual ERA leaders
