= Cody Ross =

American baseball player (born 1980)

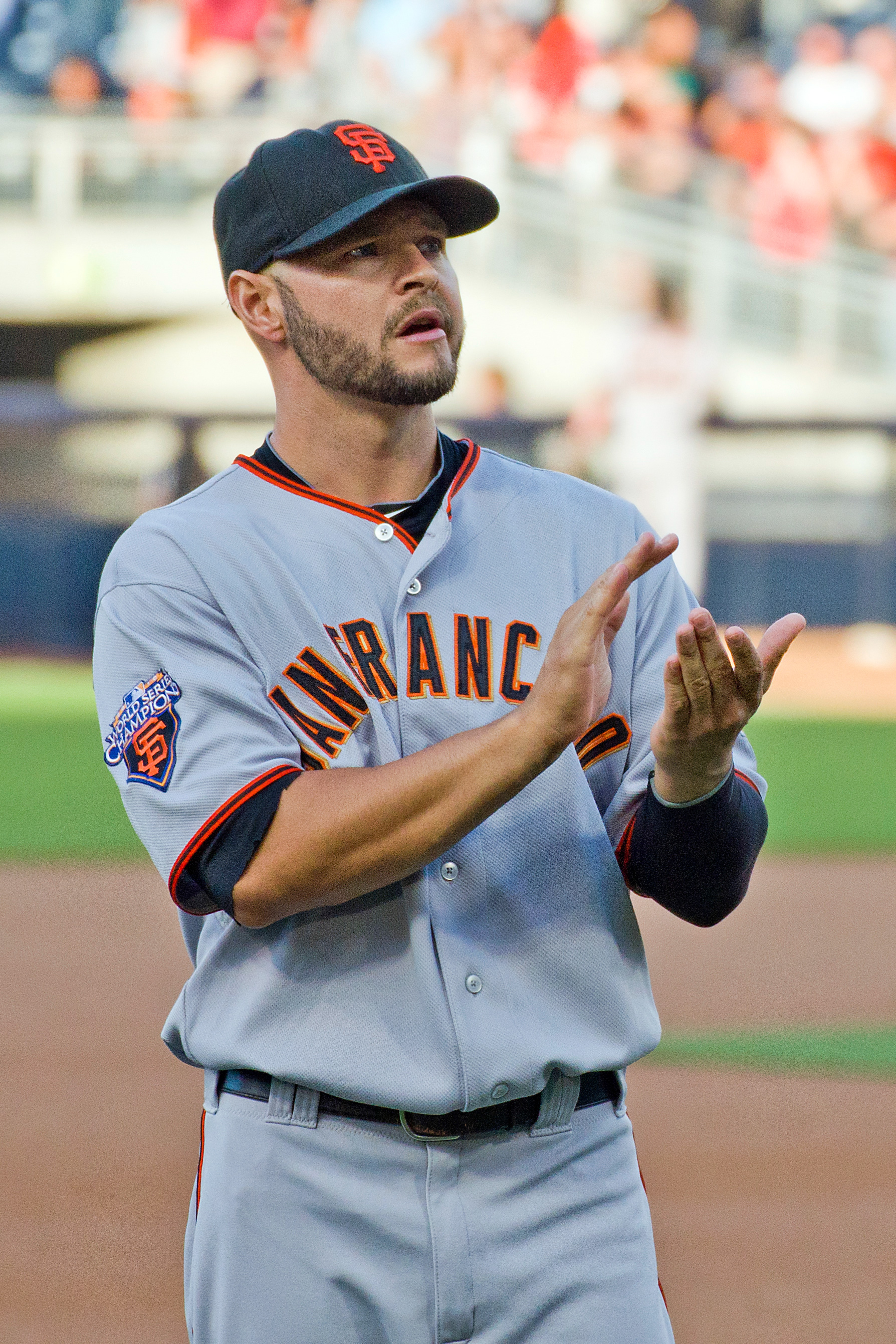
- Ross with the San Francisco Giants in 2011
- Outfielder
- Born: December 23, 1980 (age 45); Portales, New Mexico, U.S.
- Batted: Right Threw: Left

MLB debut
- July 4, 2003, for the Detroit Tigers

Last MLB appearance
- May 1, 2015, for the Oakland Athletics

MLB statistics
- Batting average: .262
- Home runs: 132
- Runs batted in: 508
- Stats at Baseball Reference

Teams
- Detroit Tigers (2003); Los Angeles Dodgers (2005–2006); Cincinnati Reds (2006); Florida Marlins (2006–2010); San Francisco Giants (2010–2011); Boston Red Sox (2012); Arizona Diamondbacks (2013–2014); Oakland Athletics (2015)

Career highlights and awards
- World Series champion (2010); NLCS MVP (2010)

Cody Joseph Ross (born December 23, 1980), nicknamed "Toy Cannon" and "Ross the Boss," is an American former professional baseball outfielder. He played in Major League Baseball (MLB) for 12 seasons; with the Detroit Tigers (2003), Los Angeles Dodgers (2005–2006), Cincinnati Reds (2006), Florida Marlins (2006–2010), San Francisco Giants (2010–2011), Boston Red Sox (2012), Arizona Diamondbacks (2013–2014) and Oakland Athletics (2015). Ross won a World Series with the San Francisco Giants in 2010. He is one of the few Major League players to bat right-handed and throw left-handed.

Following high school, Ross embarked on his professional career, getting selected by the Detroit Tigers in the fourth round of the 1999 Major League Baseball draft. He reached the Major Leagues in 2003, but suffered a torn ACL which caused him to miss most of September. He was traded to the Los Angeles Dodgers following spring training in 2004, appearing in a handful of games with them in 2005. In 2006, he played for the Los Angeles Dodgers, the Cincinnati Reds, and the Florida Marlins. It was in Florida that he finally established himself, as he played with the Marlins through 2010. He was used mainly as a reserve outfielder in 2006 and 2007, but during the 2008 season he took over a starting role. He would be a starting outfielder for the rest of his Marlins career, playing center field or right field. In 2009, he hit a career-high 24 home runs and won the Marlins' Charlie Hough Good Guy award.

During the 2010 season, the Marlins placed Ross on waivers, and he was claimed by the San Francisco Giants. Named their starting right fielder for the 2010 playoffs, he went on to win the National League Championship Series Most Valuable Player Award, hitting five home runs in the postseason while helping the Giants win the 2010 World Series over the Texas Rangers. He re-signed with San Francisco in 2011, batting .240 during the year. In 2012, he signed a one-year contract with the Boston Red Sox, hitting 22 home runs while playing every day despite the fact that the Red Sox originally expected him to be a reserve player for them. The Arizona Diamondbacks signed him to a three-year contract in December 2012, but a season-ending hip injury limited Ross to 94 games during his first year with the team.

== Early life ==
Cody Joseph Ross was born on December 23, 1980, in Portales, New Mexico. Ross's father was a chiropractor and professional bull rider; and as a youth, Ross wanted to become a rodeo clown. He used to attend his father's bull-riding matches in clown outfits, complete with makeup. He did not give up on the aspiration until his family moved to Dallas, Texas. The Ross family eventually moved back to New Mexico, and Ross played high school baseball at Carlsbad High School. Ross also played football until ninth grade. During high school, he was a Baseball America All-American selection. As a senior, he threw a five-inning perfect game. He graduated in 1999.

== Professional career ==
=== Draft and minor leagues ===
Ross was drafted by the Detroit Tigers in the fourth round of the 1999 Major League Baseball draft. He began his minor league career that year with the rookie Gulf Coast League Tigers, batting .218 with 31 hits, eight doubles, three triples, four home runs, and 18 runs batted in (RBI) in 42 games. In 2000, he played for the A West Michigan Whitecaps of the Midwest League, getting named the Midwest League Player of the Week from June 18–24 after he scored four runs, had two doubles and a triple, drove in six runs, and batted .636. In 122 games, he batted .267 with 116 hits, 17 doubles, nine triples, seven home runs, 68 RBI, and 11 stolen bases. His nine triples were tied for second in the league. After the season, Baseball America said he had the best outfield arm in the Detroit system.

Ross played for the A-advanced Lakeland Tigers of the Florida State League in 2001. He was the league's player of the week from June 18–24 after stealing four bases and batting .516 with 11 runs scored, three doubles, two home runs, and five RBI. Then, he was named Player of the Week from August 13 to 19 after batting .385. In 127 games (10th in the league), Ross batted .276 with 84 runs scored (fifth), 133 hits (eighth), 34 doubles (second to Matt Padgett's 37), five triples (tied with eight other players for seventh), 15 home runs (tied with Jason Jones for eighth), 80 RBI (seventh), and 28 stolen bases (tied with Josh McKinley for eighth). After the season, Baseball America ranked him the ninth best Tigers' prospect and again said he had the best outfield arm in the organization.

In 2002, Ross played for the AA Erie SeaWolves of the Eastern League, getting named to both the regular season and postseason All-Star teams for the league. He was named the Tigers' Minor League Player of the Month in June after hitting .336 with 29 runs, 10 doubles, two triples, eight home runs, 30 RBI, and 10 stolen bases; he earned the same honor from Topps. A broken toe forced him out of action from July 1 through August 2 and limited him to 105 games. He finished the year with 112 hits, 28 doubles, three triples, 72 RBI, and 16 stolen bases. His 19 home runs were tied with Andy Phillips and Aaron McNeal for ninth in the league. After the season, he played for the Mesa Solar Sox of the Arizona Fall League. For the third year in a row, Baseball America said he had the best outfield arm in the Tigers' system.

Ross began 2003 with the AAA Toledo Mud Hens of the International League.

=== Detroit Tigers (2003) ===
On July 4, he was called up by the Tigers. He made his Major League debut that day, going hitless in two at bats before exiting after getting hit by a pitch in the sixth inning as the Tigers lost 9–8 to the Kansas City Royals. He got his first hit on July 9, an RBI single against Bartolo Colón in a 4–2 victory over the Chicago White Sox. After he had one hit in four games, he was optioned back to Toledo on July 16 to make room for Danny Patterson, who was returning from the disabled list. From July 27 to 29, and again from August 17 to 18, Ross homered in three consecutive games for the Mud Hens. In 124 games for the Mud Hens, Ross batted .287 with 135 hits, 35 doubles (tied for sixth in the International League with Andy Abad and Luis Rodríguez), six triples (tied for fourth with Ross Gload and Coco Crisp), 20 home runs (tied for third with Brandon Larson behind Fernando Seguignol's 28 and Ernie Young's 21), 61 RBI, and 15 stolen bases. He was recalled to the big leagues in September when rosters expanded. On September 2, he hit a grand slam off Cliff Lee for his first Major League home run in an 8–6 victory over the Cleveland Indians, becoming the first Tiger since Milt Cuyler in 1991 to hit a grand slam for his first home run. In that same game, he tore his ACL running to first base, which required season-ending surgery. In six games with the Tigers, Ross had four hits in 19 at bats, including five RBI. Ross was named the Tigers' Minor League Player of the Year, and he was named to Baseball America's postseason All-Star team. For the final time, he was rated as having the best outfield arm in the Detroit organization.

In 2004, Ross was supposed to begin the season in the minors for Detroit. However, with Detroit desperate for bullpen help, Ross was traded to the Los Angeles Dodgers on April 1 for relief pitcher Steve Colyer. He was assigned to the AAA Las Vegas 51s of the Pacific Coast League, where he was teammates with Jayson Werth and Shane Victorino, whom he went on to face in the 2010 National League Championship Series (NLCS). Injuries marred Ross's 2004 campaign; a knee injury kept him out for two weeks early in the season, he missed time from May 26 to July 15 after smashing his hand in a car door and breaking his finger, and he broke his wrist on August 25 which ended his season. In 60 games, he batted .273 with 65 hits, 17 doubles, 14 home runs, and 49 RBI. Ross spent most of 2005 with Las Vegas. From July 26 to August 11, he hit 10 home runs and had 25 RBI in 17 games. In 115 games, he batted .267 with 105 hits, 21 doubles, 22 home runs, and 63 RBI.

=== Los Angeles Dodgers (2005–2006) ===
On June 24, 2005, Ross was recalled by the Dodgers to give them another bat during interleague play. He appeared in 14 games, batting .160 with four hits (one double, no home runs) and one RBI before getting sent back down on July 14 in favor of Steve Schmoll. He was not called up in September.

Ross was out of options in 2006 and made the Dodgers Opening Day roster as a backup outfielder only because of an injury to Kenny Lofton. On April 13, he hit a tie-breaking grand slam and a three-run home run in a 13–5 victory over the Pittsburgh Pirates. He batted .500 in eight games for the Dodgers before getting designated for assignment on April 17 to make room for Óscar Robles on the roster.

=== Cincinnati Reds (2006) ===
A week later, he was traded to the Cincinnati Reds for cash or a player to be named later (Ben Kozlowski).

Ross broke his finger in his debut with the Reds on April 29 and went on the disabled list. He returned to the Reds on May 23 and appeared in one more game before getting traded to the Florida Marlins on May 26 for cash considerations.

=== Florida Marlins (2006–2010) ===
==== 2006 ====
Upon joining the Marlins in 2006, Ross was forced to shave his beard, in order to comply with the Marlins' no-facial-hair policy. Manager Joe Girardi quipped, "Maybe he can put it on top of his head." He was used as a backup outfielder but got many starts at all three outfield positions throughout the year, especially from June 10 through 30, July 21 through August 8, and September 11 through the end of the season. On September 11, Ross hit a three-run home run against David Williams and a pair of two-run home runs against Heath Bell and Royce Ring in a 16–5 win over the New York Mets. His three home runs and seven RBI in the game tied Marlins records. Ross's five home runs and 14 RBI in September were more than he had in any other month that season. In 91 games (250 at bats) with the Marlins in 2006, Ross batted .212 with 53 hits, 11 doubles, 11 home runs, and 37 RBI.

==== 2007 ====
Again a reserve outfielder in 2007, Ross batted .673 before going on the disabled list with a strained left hamstring on May 6. He returned on July 19 and continued to be used in a variety of roles for the Marlins. For much of the year, he platooned with Alfredo Amézaga in centerfield. On April 20, he hit his first career pinch-hit home run against Chad Cordero to tie the Marlins with the Washington Nationals in the ninth inning; however, the Marlins went on to lose 6–5 in 14 innings. Four days later, he homered and had five RBI against Mark Redman in an 11–6 loss to the Atlanta Braves. He had another pinch-hit home run on August 23 against Brad Thompson in an 11–3 victory over the St. Louis Cardinals. In 66 games (173 at bats), Ross hit .335 with 58 hits, 19 doubles, 12 home runs, and 39 RBI.

==== 2008 ====
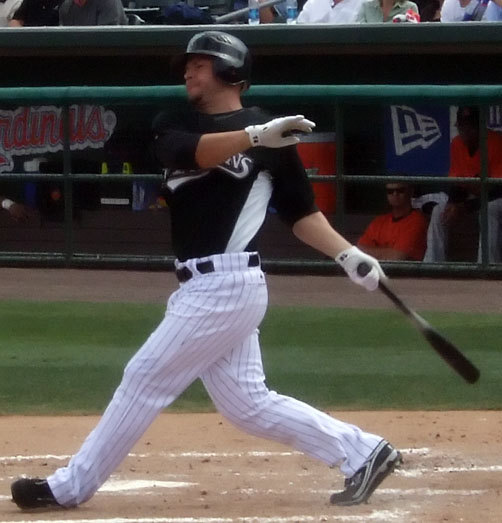
Ross with the Florida Marlins in 2008 spring training

Ross began 2008 platooning with Amézaga again in center field, though Amézaga was eventually replaced by Jacque Jones as Ross's centerfield partner. Ross played against left-handed pitchers as Amézaga and Jones faced right-handers. Ross struggled in April, batting .159 with no home runs and two RBI. After receiving a text message from his father at the beginning of May saying he would improve, Ross declared that he was restarting his season and had 10 home runs and 18 RBI in the month. During the month, Ross had a stretch where nine out of 10 hits were home runs, becoming the first player to have a streak of that sort since Mark McGwire in 2001. On May 14, he hit a game-tying three-run ninth inning home run against Francisco Cordero in a 10-inning, 7–6 loss to the Reds. Then, on June 7 he hit a game-winning three-run home run in the bottom of the ninth inning against Cordero to give the Marlins an 8–7 victory over the Reds. Jones was designated for assignment on June 11, putting Ross in sole control of centerfield. In a four-game series with the Colorado Rockies from July 3 through 6, Ross had 15 RBI, becoming the first player to have that many in a four-game series since Carlton Fisk in 1977. Fourteen of those RBI came from July 4 through 6, the most in a three-game span since Sammy Sosa had 16 in 2002. In 145 games (461 at bats), Ross hit .260 with 120 hits, 29 doubles, 22 home runs, and 73 RBI.

==== 2009 ====
For the first time in his career in 2009, Ross was a starting outfielder for the entire season. He began the year as the right fielder for the Marlins, who wanted prospect Cameron Maybin to play centerfield. On April 26, he pitched a scoreless ninth inning for the Marlins to finish a 13–2 loss to the Philadelphia Phillies. After Maybin batted only .202, Ross moved back to centerfield on May 10 when he was sent down. On June 12, he hit his third grand slam of the season against Brandon League to give the Marlins a 7–3 victory over the Toronto Blue Jays. The grand slam tied Bobby Bonilla's and Jeff Conine's record for grand slams in a season by a Marlin. Dan Uggla and he hit back-to-back solo home runs against Kevin Gregg in the ninth inning on August 2 to give the Marlins a 3–2 victory over the Chicago Cubs. On August 16, he set a team record by notching six hits in a doubleheader against the Rockies. Ross returned to right field on August 31 when Maybin was recalled. He set career-highs in most categories in 2009. In 151 games (559 at bats), he batted .270 with 151 hits, 37 doubles, 24 home runs, and 90 RBI. In the daytime, he batted .349, the fourth-highest mark in the NL. Following the season, he was named the Marlins Charlie Hough Good Guy award winner.

==== 2010 ====
Ross began 2010 in right field, but he moved to center field when Maybin was sent down on June 17. He had four hits on April 7 in a 10-inning, 7–6 victory over the Mets. On May 10, he stole home as part of a double steal with Maybin in a 4–2 victory over the Cubs, marking the first time a Marlin had stolen home since Reggie Abercrombie did so in 2006. Six days later, he again had four hits in a 10–8 victory over the Mets. In his first 120 games (452 at bats), Ross batted .265 with 120 hits, 24 doubles, 11 home runs, and 58 RBI. After the Marlins fell out of contention in 2010 and with Ross due for a pay raise the following year, the Marlins put him on waivers in August in order save money and give their young players more playing time.

=== San Francisco Giants (2010–2011) ===
On August 21, 2010, Ross was awarded to the San Francisco Giants on a waiver claim, partly to prevent him from being acquired by the San Diego Padres. He appeared in 33 regular season games for the Giants, batting .288 with three home runs. In 153 games combined with Florida and San Francisco (525 at bats), he batted .269 with 141 hits, 28 doubles, 14 home runs, and 65 RBI. The Giants went on to overtake the Padres late in the season to win the NL West Division title.

Ross was named the Giants' starting right fielder for the playoffs because of a neck injury to José Guillén, according to Bruce Bochy at the start of the postseason. However, it was later revealed that Guillén had been left off the roster after a package of human growth hormone was intercepted as it was being shipped to his house. In the ensuing NL Division Series (NLDS) against the Atlanta Braves, Ross started all four games in right field, hit a home run to tie the deciding fourth game, and drove in the winning runs in two of the Giants' three wins. Ross hit two home runs off of Roy Halladay in Game 1 in the following NLCS against the Phillies, and hit a solo home run against Roy Oswalt in Game 2. Following the Giants' Game 6 win of the NLCS, Ross was awarded the MVP award for the series, in which he hit .350 with three home runs, three doubles and recorded five RBI. Three of his five postseason home runs broke up no-hitters. His home run off the Braves' Derek Lowe was the Giants' first hit in Game 4 of the NLDS. His first home run off Halladay in Game 1 of the NLCS, in addition to being the first hit off Halladay in the game, was the first hit off Halladay in 11 innings, as Halladay had thrown a no-hitter in his previous start. Finally, his home run off Oswalt in Game 2 of the NLCS was the Giants' first hit of the game. In Game 3 of the World Series against the Texas Rangers, he hit the first home run for the Giants off Colby Lewis; however, the Giants went on to lose 4–2. He won his first World Series ring as the Giants defeated the Rangers in five games to win their first World Series since 1954.

In 2011, Ross re-signed with the Giants on a one-year contract worth $6.3 million. Henry Schulman of the San Francisco Chronicle called it a "mild surprise" that Ross did not sign at least a two-year deal. He began the season on the disabled list with a sprained right calf, but he assumed the Giants' right field job upon his return on April 20. On May 10, Ross had a game-ending single against David Hernandez in a 1–0 victory over the Diamondbacks. After May 10, Ross began playing left field most of the time when Pat Burrell was moved to the bench. On May 18, Ross hit a three-run home run with two outs in the ninth inning against Lance Cormier to give the Giants an 8–5 victory over the Dodgers. From August through the end of the year, Ross began moving around between all three outfield positions, only once making four straight starts at the same position. He hit the 100th home run of his career against Alex White on September 16 in a 9–1 victory over Colorado. In the same game, Ross pulled his right hamstring, forcing him to miss the rest of the season. In 121 games (405 at bats), Ross hit .240 with 97 hits, 25 doubles, 14 home runs, and 52 RBI. He led the Giants with a career-high 49 walks.

=== Boston Red Sox (2012) ===
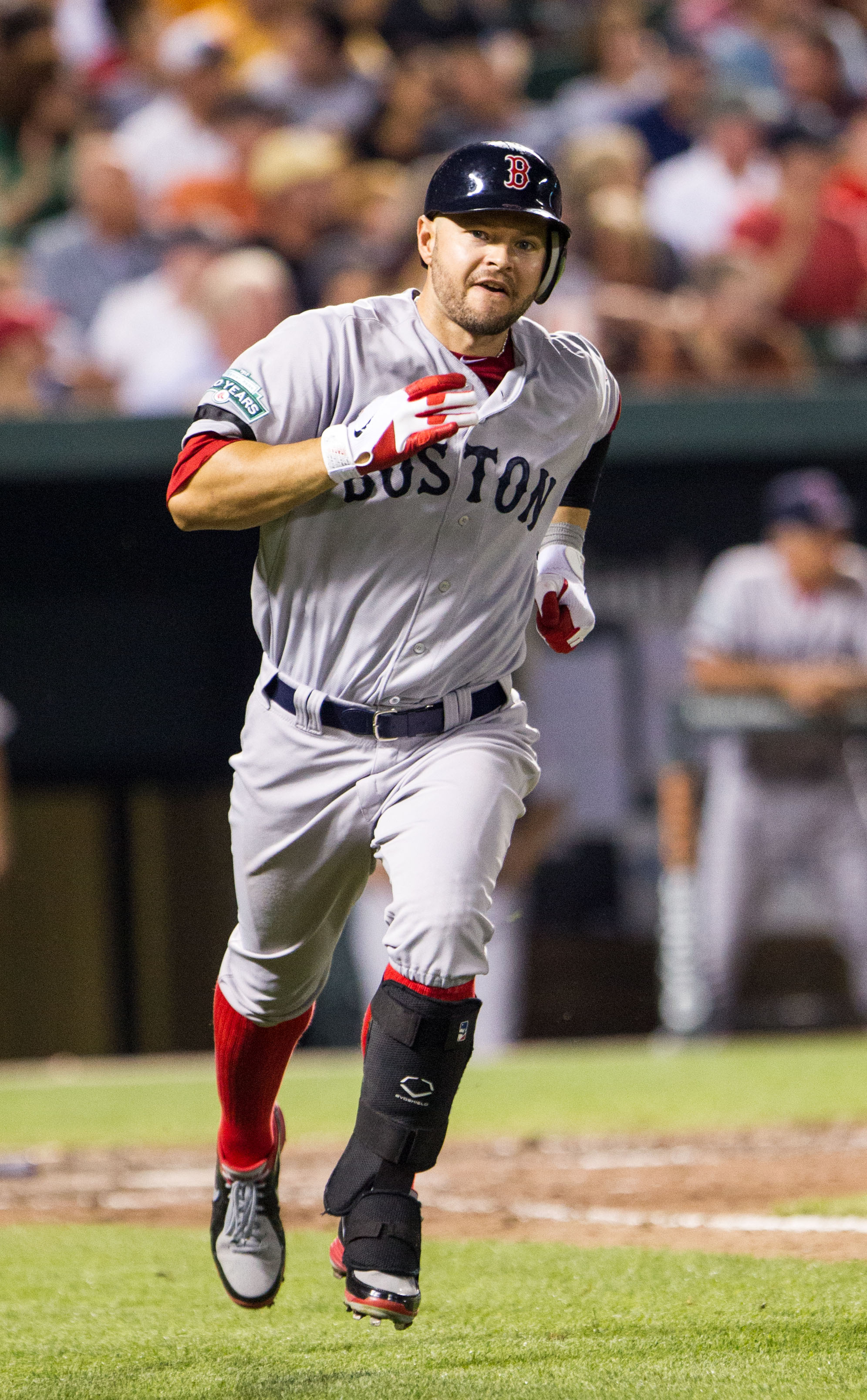
Ross with the Boston Red Sox in 2012

On January 26, 2012, Ross finalized a one-year contract with the Boston Red Sox. He was supposed to provide depth off the bench, but injuries, particularly to Carl Crawford, led to him holding a starting role for the entire season. He started almost every day for Boston in all three outfield positions, but mainly right field. On April 14, Ross hit his first home run in a Red Sox uniform, a two-run shot off the Tampa Bay Rays's Dane De La Rosa in a 13–5 Red Sox victory. The next day, Ross hit a three-run homer in the bottom of the second inning off Matt Moore in a 6–4 victory over the Rays. On May 18, 2012, Ross suffered a fractured foot after fouling a ball off his foot. He was placed on the disabled list and expected to miss from six to eight weeks.

On June 19, Ross was activated from the disabled list. His first game back, he hit a home run against Mark Buehrle over the Green Monster at Fenway Park in a 7–5 victory over the Miami Marlins. Five days later, he hit two home runs and had five RBI in a 9–4 victory over the Braves. He hit two consecutive three-run home runs against Pedro Hernández of the White Sox on July 18 in a 10–1 Red Sox victory. The next day, he hit a three-run home run against Addison Reed for a walk-off win against the White Sox. For the season, he had a .267 average, 127 hits, 34 doubles, 22 home runs, and 81 RBI in 130 games (476 at bats).

=== Arizona Diamondbacks (2013–2014) ===
On December 22, 2012, Ross agreed to a three-year contract with the Arizona Diamondbacks worth a reported $26 million, with a club option and a $1 million buyout. An injured left calf caused him to miss the beginning of the season; he made his return April 13. He began the 2013 season playing right field, but in May and for the rest of the season he split time between right and left field. On June 19, he hit a pinch-hit three-run home run against Mike Dunn in a 3–1 victory over the Marlins. He hit a three-run home run against Matt Harvey to put the Diamondbacks ahead 3–2 on July 3; the Diamondbacks would wind up defeating the Mets 5–2. Three days later, he set a career high with five hits and added three runs scored in an 11–1 victory over Colorado. On August 2, he had four hits, two doubles, and three RBI, including a game-winning solo home run against Pedro Beato in a 7–6 victory over Boston. On August 11, Ross dislocated his right hip while running to first base. He was placed on the disabled list and missed the rest of the season. In 94 games (317 at bats) in 2013, Ross batted .278 with 88 hits, 17 doubles, eight home runs, and 38 RBI.

On April 4, 2015, Ross was released by the Diamondbacks.

=== Oakland Athletics (2015) ===
On April 8, 2015, Ross signed a one-year deal with the Oakland Athletics for the league minimum salary of $507,500, with the Diamondbacks paying the remainder of his salary with them. He was released on May 3, 2015.

== Post-playing career ==
On May 15, 2016, Ross referred to himself as "not playing anymore" on his Twitter page. In February 2017, he joined the Giants as a spring training instructor, a role he returned to in 2018.

== Legacy ==
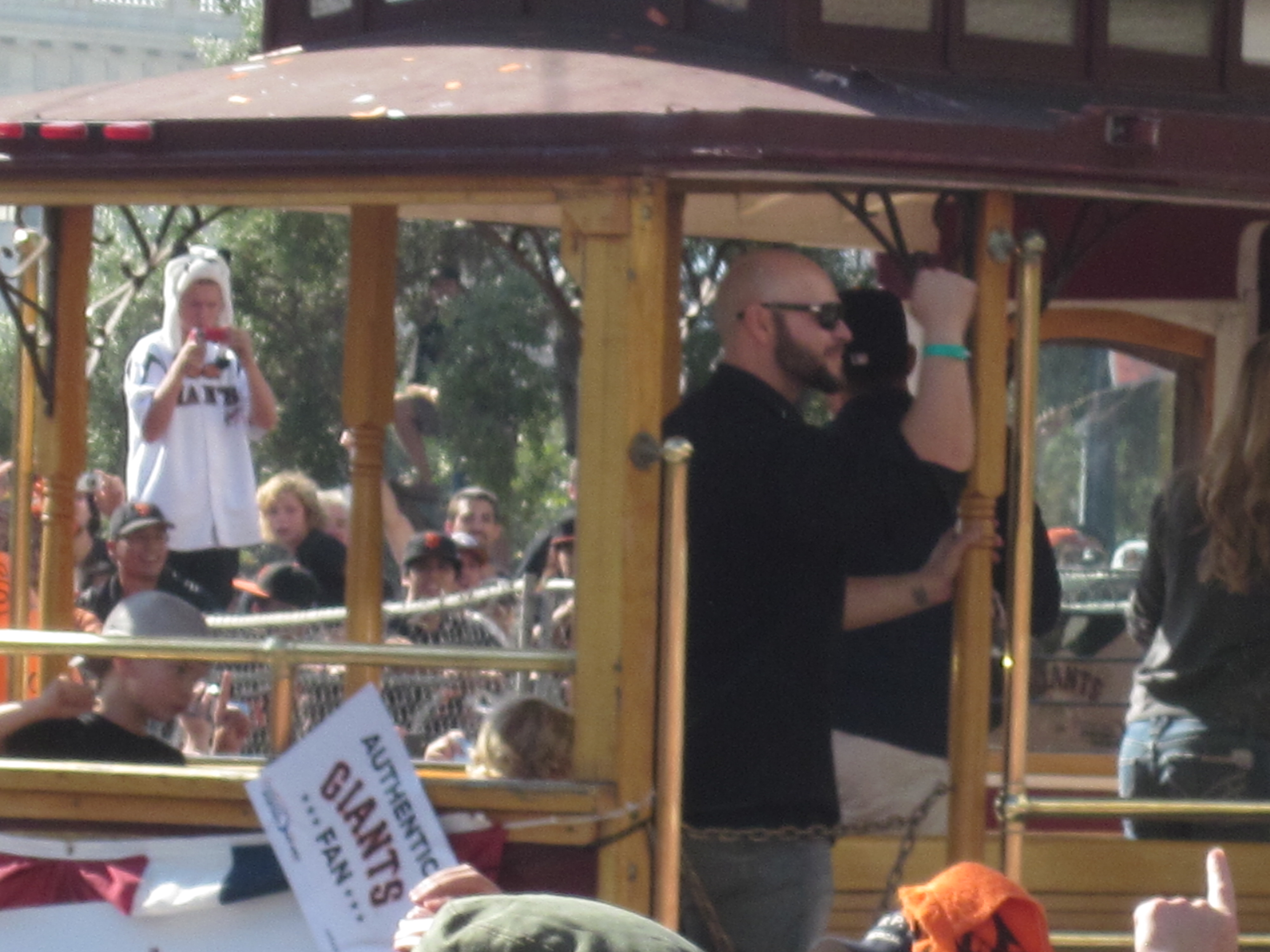
Ross at the Giants' 2010 World Series victory parade

Ross was a streaky player throughout his career. He described this in 2006: "I have gotten in grooves before, and you try to stay in it as long as you can until it ends. And it does end. I've been notorious for that my whole career, where I'll hit five or six in a week, where it seems like I can't miss the pitch and I feel good in the batter's box." The most famous of these came in 2010, when Ross's hitting in the playoffs helped San Francisco win the 2010 World Series.

Years later, when asked about the two home runs he hit against Roy Halladay in Game 1 of the 2010 NLCS, Ross recalled an earlier encounter from the same season: Roy Halladay's perfect game against the Marlins, for whom Ross played before being acquired by the Giants. "That was one of the most incredible things I've been part of, and I was on the wrong side of it," Ross said. "When I hear his name, I still think of him as the toughest pitcher I've ever faced or seen."

During his career, Ross has earned a reputation for bringing energy to his teams and being a positive influence to his teammates. He has been a fan favorite in his career, especially in Florida and San Francisco, where he earned the nicknames "Toy Cannon" and "Ross the Boss", respectively.

Ross bats right-handed and throws left-handed; one of the rarest dominant bats/throws combinations in the history of Major League baseball. The only position player in the Baseball Hall of Fame with this combination of "bats/throws" is Rickey Henderson, who, like Ross, also had stints with the Dodgers, Red Sox and Athletics.

== Personal life ==
Ross and his wife, Summer, live most of the year in Scottsdale, Arizona, with their three children: Hudson, Haven Leigh, and Harley. His father, Kenny, played strong safety at the University of New Mexico but became a chiropractor and bull rider after undergoing three knee surgeries in college. Ross has a sister, Sarah, who was a long-jumper and basketball player growing up. Ross' cousin, Trevor Rogers, plays in MLB.
