= Dean Treanor =

American baseball player and coach (born 1947)

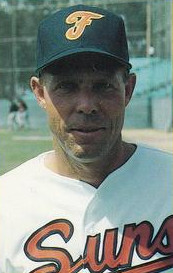
- Treanor in 1988
- Pitcher / Bullpen coach
- Born: December 8, 1947 (age 78); San Luis Obispo, California, U.S.
- Bats: Left Throws: Right
- Stats at Baseball Reference

Teams
- As coach: Miami Marlins (2017–2019)

Dean Leroy Treanor (born December 8, 1947) is an American professional baseball player, coach and manager. He played in minor league baseball as a right-handed pitcher. As of March 2023 he coaches the China national baseball team.

== Baseball career ==
Treanor is a native and resident of San Luis Obispo, California. He attended Cal Poly San Luis Obispo. There is some discrepancy among sources regarding Treanor's professional playing career. The Indians' official website states that he signed with the Cincinnati Reds and progressed as high as the Double-A level with the Trois-Rivières Aigles of the Eastern League. However, his page on Baseball Reference lists only two total pitching appearances with the Fresno Suns in 1988 (at age 40) and Reno Silver Sox in 1991 (at 43), both of the Class A California League. In 2011, MLB.com reported that Treanor's playing career was cut short by a rotator cuff injury in 1975, and that he spent 13 years as a police officer and undercover narcotics agent in his hometown.

In 1988, Treanor returned to baseball as a minor league manager and pitching coach, working in the organizations of the Cleveland Indians, San Diego Padres, Montreal Expos, Los Angeles Dodgers and Florida Marlins. He has managed at the highest level of the minor leagues in 2002–03, 2005–08, and 2011–16 in the Marlins' and Pirates' organizations with the Calgary Cannons, Albuquerque Isotopes, and Indianapolis. He also served as a pitching coach with the Double-A Altoona Curve (2009) and Triple-A Indianapolis (2010).

From 2011 through 2016, he was the manager of the Indianapolis Indians, Triple-A farm system affiliate of the Pittsburgh Pirates in the International League. According to the Indianapolis Indians' official website, Treanor is only the eighth Indians' manager in the Indians' 113-year history to have helmed the club for four or more consecutive seasons. He won back-to-back division championships in 2012–13. Through 2016, his 14-season career record as a manager was 1,000–958 (.511).

Treanor served as the Miami Marlins bullpen coach from 2016 to 2019.

Treanor served as the pitching coach of his hometown San Luis Obispo Blues—a semi-pro/collegiate team he once managed in the 1970s and 1980s.

Sporting positions
Preceded by Chris Chambliss	Calgary Cannons manager 2002	Succeeded by Franchise relocated
Preceded by Franchise established Tracy Woodson	Albuquerque Isotopes manager 2003; 2005–2008	Succeeded by Tracy Woodson; Tim Wallach
Preceded by Frank Kremblas	Indianapolis Indians manager 2011–2016	Succeeded by Andy Barkett
Preceded by Reid Cornelius	Miami Marlins bullpen coach 2017–2019	Succeeded by Wellington Cepeda
