= Jupiter Hammerheads =

- Founded in 1998; Jupiter, Florida
Team logo
Cap insignia

Minor league affiliations
- Class: Single-A (2021–present)
- Previous classes: Class A-Advanced (1998–2020)
- League: Florida State League (1998–present)
- Division: East Division

Major league affiliations
- Team: Miami Marlins (2002–present)
- Previous teams: Montreal Expos (1998–2001)

Minor league titles
- League titles (2): 2023; 2026
- Division titles (3): 2012; 2023; 2026
- First-half titles (1): 2026
- Second-half titles (1): 2023

Team data
- Name: Jupiter Hammerheads (1998–present)
- Colors: Black, blue, red, dark gray, light gray, white
- Mascot: Hamilton R. Head
- Ballpark: Roger Dean Chevrolet Stadium (1998–present)
- Owner(s)/ Operator(s): Miami Marlins / Jupiter Stadium, LTD
- General manager: Nick Bernabe
- Manager: Kyle Stahlberg
- Website: www.milb.com/jupiter

The Jupiter Hammerheads are a Minor League Baseball team of the Florida State League and the Single-A affiliate of the Miami Marlins. They are located in the town of Jupiter in Palm Beach County, Florida, and play their home games at Roger Dean Chevrolet Stadium. Opened in 1998, the park seats 6,871 people. They share the facility with the Palm Beach Cardinals, also of the Florida State League.

On May 23, 2011, the Hammerheads gained national attention after playing in a 23-inning game against the Clearwater Threshers.

In 2012, the Hammerheads won the 2nd Half Division Title and went on to defeat the St. Lucie Mets in a decisive Game 3 of the Division Championship Series to capture their first ever Division title. Jupiter lost in the FSL Championship in the fifth and final game against the Lakeland Flying Tigers, despite holding a 2–1 lead after Game 3.

In conjunction with Major League Baseball's restructuring of Minor League Baseball in 2021, the Hammerheads were organized into the Low-A Southeast at the Low-A classification. In 2022, the Low-A Southeast became known as the Florida State League, the name historically used by the regional circuit prior to the 2021 reorganization, and was reclassified as a Single-A circuit.

In 2023, the Hammerheads won their first ever Florida State League championship when they beat the Clearwater Threshers 7-4 in the 3rd game of the best of three series.

== Season-by-season results ==
League champions †	Finals appearance *	Division winner ^	Wild card berth ¤

Year	League	Division	Regular season										Postseason
Year	League	Division	1st half					2nd half					Postseason
Year	League	Division	Finish	Wins	Losses	Win%	GB	Finish	Wins	Losses	Win%	GB	Postseason
1998	FSL	East	1st ^	40	30	.571	—	1st ^	40	30	.571	—	Lost semifinals (St. Lucie) 0–2
1999	FSL	East	1st ^	39	29	.574	—	4th	34	36	.486	7	Lost semifinals (Kissimmee) 1–2
2000	FSL	East	6th	27	43	.386	20.5	4th	34	36	.486	10.5	
2001	FSL	East	6th	29	38	.433	10.5	2nd	41	31	.569	2.5	
2002	FSL	East	3rd	39	32	.549	0.5	1st ^	42	25	.627	—	Lost semifinals (Lakeland) 0–2
2003	FSL	East	1st ^	42	28	.600	—	3rd	34	34	.500	9.5	Lost semifinals (St. Lucie) 0–2
2004	FSL	East	6th	30	38	.441	9.5	4th	34	33	.507	8.5	
2005	FSL	East	3rd	35	33	.515	6	6th	24	45	.348	17.5	
2006	FSL	East	5th	31	38	.449	8.5	6th	24	42	.364	12.5	
2007	FSL	East	5th	31	39	.443	10.5	4th	32	27	.464	5	
2008	FSL	East	5th	33	36	.478	8.5	2nd	41	28	.594	0.5	
2009	FSL	South	3rd	34	33	.507	8	4th	33	37	.471	4.5	
2010	FSL	South	6th	22	46	.324	20.5	6th	24	46	.343	14	
2011	FSL	South	3rd	32	38	.457	6	6th	28	42	.400	17.5	
2012	FSL	South	2nd	36	34	.514	14	1st ^	38	28	.576	—	Won semifinals (St. Lucie) 2–1; Lost finals (Lakeland) 2–3 *
2013	FSL	South	3rd	36	32	.529	9.5	6th	32	37	.464	8	
2014	FSL	South	6th	27	42	.391	14	6th	23	45	.338	19	
2015	FSL	South	3rd	35	35	.500	10.0	5th	32	38	.457	12	
2016	FSL	South	6th	31	37	.456	7	2nd	37	32	.536	2.5	
2017	FSL	South	3rd	34	35	.493	7	5th	33	33	.500	8	
2018	FSL	South	2nd	41	28	.594	0.5	4th	29	36	.429	10	
2019	FSL	South	6th	21	42	.333	16.5	5th	33	36	.478	14	Postseason canceled due to Hurricane Dorian
2020	Season cancelled due to the COVID-19 pandemic.												
2021	Low-A Southeast	East	2nd	61	56	.521	1	In 2021, there was one combined season					
2022	FSL	East	3rd	30	34	.469	9.5	3rd	29	36	.446	8.5	
2023	FSL	East	2nd	35	31	.530	2.5	1st ^	35	31	.530	—	Won semifinals (Palm Beach 2-0) Won finals (Clearwater 2-1) †
2024	FSL	East	2nd	36	30	.545	1.0	3rd	29	35	.453	17.0	
2025	FSL	East	3rd	30	36	.455	4.5	4th	29	36	.446	14.0	
2026	FSL	East	1st ^	37	29	.561	—	4th	24	38	.446	11.5	Won semifinals (Daytona 2-0) Won finals (Tampa 2-1) †

Statistic	Wins	Losses	Win %
Regular season record (1998–2026)	1,822	1,955	.482
Postseason record (1998–2026)	13	14	.481
All-time regular and postseason record	1,835	1,969	.482

== Roster ==
Jupiter Hammerheads roster
Players	Coaches/Other
Pitchers: 22 Samuel Carpio; 43 Walin Castillo; 21 Jake Clemente; 52 Juan De La Cruz; 26 Kifraidy Encarnacion; 22 Hamlet Garcia; 30 Manuel Genao; 34 Davidxon Lara; 28 Luke Lashutka; 45 Ian Medina; 40 Gerinton Mendez; 28 Noble Meyer #; 19 Janero Miller; 55 Elier Morillo; 31 Eiver Mosquera ‡; 38 Victor Rodriguez; 52 Jonathan Rosario; 39 Yohanfer Santana; 51 Yenfri Sosa; 35 Dameivi Tineo; 32 Jonas Uzcategui; 41 Jonawel Valdez; Catchers: 15 Jeremy Almonte; 2 Nixon Chirinos; 18 Carlos Sanchez; 25 Almen Tolentino; Infielders: 23 Juan Alva; 17 Angel Brachi; &bnsp;9 Eric Guevara; 27 Josh Hogue; 4 Cam Kozeal; 4 Luis Leon; 1 Jacob Lombard; 6 Jake McCutcheon; 14 Yoffry Solano; 24 Echedry Vargas; Outfielders: 12 Luis Cova; 8 P. J. Morlando; 3 Wessley Roberson; 10 Andres Valor	Manager: 11 Kyle Stahlberg; Coaches: -- Wilfri Castro (assistant); 5 Gabe Ortiz (assistant); -- Tommy Phelps (pitching); -- Easton Waterman (hitting); 60-day injured list: -- Chris Arroyo; 32 Keyner Benitez; -- Jessada Brown; -- Darwin Rodriguez (full season); -- Grant Shepardson; -- RJ Shunck; 7-day injured list; * On Miami Marlins 40-man roster; ~ Development list; # Rehab assignment; ∞ Reserve list; ‡ Restricted list; § Suspended list; † Temporarily inactive list; Roster updated September 8, 2026; Transactions; → More rosters: MiLB • Florida State League; → Miami Marlins minor league players

== Notable alumni ==
Hall of Fame alumni

- Tim Raines (2001) Inducted, 2017

Alumni: Most Valuable Player

- Miguel Cabrera (2002) 11 x MLB All-Star; 4 x MLB Batting Title (2011-2013, 2015);2 x AL Most Valuable Player (2012,2013)

Alumni: Rookie of the Year

- Jason Bay (2001) 3 x MLB All-Star; 2004 NL Rookie of the Year
- Chris Coghlan (2007, 2011, 2013) 2009 NL Rookie of the Year
- Jose Fernandez (2013) 2 x MLB All-Star; 2013 NL Rookie of the Year
- Rafael Furcal (2014) 3 x MLB All-Star; 2000 NL Rookie of the Year
- Hanley Ramirez (2011) 3 x MLB All-Star; 2009 NL Batting Title; 2006 NL Rookie of the Year
- Dontrelle Willis (2002) 2 x MLB All-Star; 2003 NL Rookie of the Year

Notable alumni

- Antonio Alfonseca (2005)
- Josh Beckett (2002-2003, 2005) 2 x MLB All-Star
- Aaron Boone (2007) MLB All-Star
- Milton Bradley (1998) MLB All-Star
- Geoff Blum (1998)
- A. J. Burnett (2004) MLB All-Star
- Jamey Carroll (1998)
- Wil Cordero (2003) MLB All-Star
- Dee Gordon (2015) 2 x MLB All-Star; 2015 NL Batting Title
- Kevin Gregg (2014)
- Jason Grilli (2003) MLB All-Star
- Edwin Jackson (2016) MLB All-Star
- Charles Johnson (2002) 2 X MLB All-Star
- Josh Johnson (2004, 2008) MLB All-Star
- Andrew Miller (2008-2010) 2 x MLB All-Star
- Guillermo Mota (2005)
- Ricky Nolasco (2007)
- Carl Pavano (1998) MLB All-Star
- Brad Penny (2002, 2014) 2 x MLB All-Star
- Brandon Phillips (2001) 3 x MLB All-Star
- Martin Prado (2015) MLB All-Star
- Cody Ross (2007)
- Jarrod Saltalamacchia (2014)
- Aníbal Sánchez (2009) 2013 AL ERA Leader
- Giancarlo Stanton (2009, 2012–2013, 2015) 4 x MLB All-Star
- Jake Westbrook (1998) MLB All-Star
- Josh Willingham (2002)
