= Tim Cossins =

American baseball coach (born 1970)

- Coach
- Born: March 31, 1970 (age 56); Sonoma, California, U.S.
- Stats at Baseball Reference

Teams
- Baltimore Orioles (2019–2025); Houston Astros (2026)

Timothy Carter Cossins (/ˈkʌzɪns/ KUH-zins; born March 31, 1970) is an American professional baseball coach who has coached in Major League Baseball (MLB) for the Baltimore Orioles and the Houston Astros.

== Career ==
Cossins graduated from Santa Rosa High School in Santa Rosa, California. He attended Santa Rosa Junior College, and transferred to the University of Oklahoma and played college baseball for the Oklahoma Sooners. The Pittsburgh Pirates selected Cossins in the 45th round of the 1992 MLB draft, but he did not sign with Pittsburgh, returning to Oklahoma. The Texas Rangers selected him in the 16th round of the 1993 MLB draft. He played in Minor League Baseball through 2000. After his playing career, he worked for the Miami Marlins as a minor league manager for four years, and then became the Marlins' minor league catching coordinator in 2007. He was hired by the Chicago Cubs after the 2012 season to be their minor league field coordinator, succeeding Brandon Hyde, who was promoted to be the Cubs' director of player development.

The Baltimore Orioles hired Cossins from the Cubs after the 2018 season to join Hyde's coaching staff. He will hired under role of major league field coordinator and catching instructor. Cossins was fired alongside Hyde on May 17, 2025.

On November 26, 2025, Cossins was hired by the Houston Astros to serve as the team's catching coach. On October 14, 2026, the team announced that they would no longer retain Cossins' services.

== Personal life ==
Cossins lives in Santa Rosa, California. He and his wife have a son who served as a volunteer firefighter during the October 2017 Northern California wildfires.

Sporting positions
Preceded by Michael Collins	Houston Astros catching coach 2026	Succeeded by TBA
