= Eric Reed (baseball) =

American baseball player (born 1980)

- Center fielder
- Born: December 2, 1980 (age 45); Little Rock, Arkansas, U.S.
- Batted: Left Threw: Left

MLB debut
- April 3, 2006, for the Florida Marlins

Last MLB appearance
- July 18, 2007, for the Florida Marlins

MLB statistics
- Batting average: .098
- Home runs: 0
- Runs batted in: 0
- Stats at Baseball Reference

Teams
- Florida Marlins (2006–2007)

Eric Shane Reed (born December 2, 1980) is an American former Major League Baseball outfielder who played for the Florida Marlins in 2006 and 2007.

== Amateur career ==
A native of Little Rock, Arkansas, Reed attended Monticello High School in Monticello, Arkansas where he was a letterman in football, baseball, and powerlifting, and garnered all-state honors in both football and baseball. He attended Texas A&M University, and in 2001 he played collegiate summer baseball with the Wareham Gatemen of the Cape Cod Baseball League, where he was named a league all-star and won the league's Thurman Munson Award for leading all hitters with a .365 batting average. Reed was drafted in the 9th round of the 2002 Major League Baseball draft by the Florida Marlins.

== Professional career ==
Reed made his Major League Baseball debut with the Florida Marlins on April 3, 2006, against the Houston Astros. He started the season 4-for-35 (.114) with three stolen bases and was optioned to Triple-A Albuquerque on May 17. On May 19, 2008, Reed signed a minor league contract with the New York Mets and was assigned to Double-A Binghamton, but was released in early July.
