= Florida Complex League Marlins =

- Founded in 1992; Jupiter, Florida

Minor league affiliations
- Class: Rookie
- League: Florida Complex League
- Division: East Division
- Previous leagues: Gulf Coast League (1992–2020)

Major league affiliations
- Team: Miami Marlins (2012–present)
- Previous teams: Florida Marlins (pre-2012)

Minor league titles
- League titles (0): None
- Division titles (8): 1994; 1995; 1998; 2000; 2009; 2010; 2011; 2024

Team data
- Name: FCL Marlins
- Previous names: GCL Marlins (1992–2020)
- Ballpark: Roger Dean Stadium
- Owner/ Operator: Miami Marlins

The Florida Complex League Marlins are a Rookie-level affiliate of the Miami Marlins, competing in the Florida Complex League of Minor League Baseball. Prior to the 2021 season, the team was known as the Gulf Coast League Marlins. The team plays its home games in Jupiter, Florida, at Roger Dean Stadium, which is also the spring training home of the St. Louis Cardinals and the Miami Marlins. The team is mainly composed of players who are in their first year of professional baseball either as draftees or non-drafted free agents.

== History ==
The team first entered the Gulf Coast League (GCL) in 1992, and has competed continuously since then. The team was based in Kissimmee, Florida, during 1992–1993 and Melbourne, Florida, during 1994–2001. The team has won multiple division titles, but has yet to capture a league championship.

The GCL Marlins threw a combined perfect game against the GCL Astros on July 19, 2012. Justin Jackson pitched the first six innings, Patrick Merkling pitched the seventh inning and Dane Stone pitched the last two innings.

Prior to the 2021 season, the Gulf Coast League was renamed as the Florida Complex League (FCL).

== Season-by-season ==
Year	Record	Finish	Manager	Playoffs
1992	33-27	4th	Carlos Tosca	
1993	32-28	6th (t)	Jim Hendry	
1994	38-21	4th	Juan Bustabad	Lost in 1st round vs. GCL Astros (1 game to 0)
1995	40-16	1st	Juan Bustabad	Lost in 1st round vs. GCL Tigers (1 game to 0)
1996	34-25	5th	Juan Bustabad	
1997	31-28	5th	Jon Deeble	
1998	38-22	1st	Jon Deeble	Lost in 1st round vs. GCL Devil Rays (1 game to 0)
1999	25-35	12th	Jon Deeble	
2000	40-20	2nd	Kevin Boles	Lost in 1st round vs. GCL Yankees (1 game to 0)
2001	29-31	9th	Jon Deeble	
2002	31-29	6th	Jesus Campos	
2003	26-32	11th	Tim Cossins	
2004	31-29	6th (t)	Tim Cossins	
2005	24-30	9th (t)	Edwin Rodríguez	
2006	29-24	5th	Edwin Rodríguez	
2007	29-25	6th	Tim Cossins	
2008	30-24	5th	Steve Watson	
2009	38-17	1st	Jorge Hernandez	Lost League Finals vs. GCL Nationals (2 games to 0); Won in first round vs. GCL Yankees (1 game to 0)
2010	37-19	1st	Jorge Hernandez	Lost in 1st round vs. GCL Rays (1 game to 0)
2011	38-16	1st	Jorge Hernandez	Lost League Finals vs. GCL Yankees (2 games to 0); Won in first round vs. GCL Pirates (1 game to 0)
2012	29-30	7th	Jorge Hernandez	
2013	25-34	14th	Julio Garcia	
2014	25-35	12th (t)	Julio Garcia	
2015	33-27	7th	Julio Bruno	
2016	24-31	12th (t)	Julio Bruno	
2017	32-23	5th	John Pachot	
2018	25-31	12th	John Pachot	
2019	28-22	5th	Robert Rodriguez	Playoffs cancelled due to Hurricane Dorian
2020	No Season due to pandemic			
2021	27-28	8th	Luis Dorante	
2022	31-24	6th	Luis Dorante	
2023	27-25	8th	Luis Dorante	
2024	39-15	1st	Luis Dorante	Lost in 1st round vs. FCL Tigers (1 game to 0)
2025	19-35	14th	Gabe Ortiz	

== Roster ==
Florida Complex League Marlins roster
Players	Coaches/Other
Pitchers: -- Bane Barker; -- Trey Beard; -- Connor Benge; -- Fabio Bundi; -- Porter Buursema; 59 Kifraidy Encarnacion; -- Colby Guy; -- Tyler Kapa; -- Ethan Kleinschmit; -- Colin Linder; -- Duke McCarron; -- Jackson Mitchell; 91 Pedro Montero; 45 Jose Paulino; -- Zach Peters; -- Ryan Peterson; 43 Jonathan Rosario; 39 Yohanfer Santana §; -- Cole Selvig; 31 Yenfri Sosa; Catchers: 8 Adrian Bello; -- Joey Lawson; 28 Almen Tolentino; Infielders: 23 Luis Arana; 19 Angel Brachi; 27 Breyias Dean; -- Eric Guevara; -- Luis Leon; 15 Yordani Martinez; 6 Andrew Salas; -- Rintaro Sasaki; -- Nic Tolbert; Outfielders: 22 John Cruz; 29 Jancory De La Cruz; -- Hyun Seung Lee; -- Jatniel McCloud; -- Wessley Roberson	Manager: -- Joel Avina; Coaches: 48 Ivan Arteaga (pitching); -- Mark Branz (pitching); -- Victor Di Diego (defensive); -- Jason Krizon (hitting); -- Masayuki Maruhash (defensive); -- Cameron Witt (hitting); 60-day injured list: -- Jose Castro (full season); 11 Kevin Defrank; 37 Diego Godoy (full season); 48 Elvin Jimenez (full season); 40 Albert Polanco (full season); -- Natanael Polanco (full season); -- Kaiden Wilson (full season); 7-day injured list; * On Miami Marlins 40-man roster; ~ Development list; # Rehab assignment; ∞ Reserve list; ‡ Restricted list; § Suspended list; † Temporarily inactive list; Roster updated August 11, 2026; Transactions; → More rosters: MiLB • Florida Complex League; → Miami Marlins minor league players
