= 2007 Cincinnati Reds season =

2007 Cincinnati Reds
- League: National League
- Division: Central
- Ballpark: Great American Ball Park
- City: Cincinnati
- Record: 72–90 (.444)
- Divisional place: 5th
- Owners: Robert Castellini
- General managers: Wayne Krivsky
- Managers: Jerry Narron (until 07/01); Pete Mackanin
- Television: FSN Ohio (George Grande, Thom Brennaman, Chris Welsh)
- Radio: WLW (700 AM); Cincinnati Bell Reds Radio Network (Marty Brennaman, Thom Brennaman, Joe Nuxhall, Jeff Brantley)
- Stats: ESPN.com; Baseball Reference

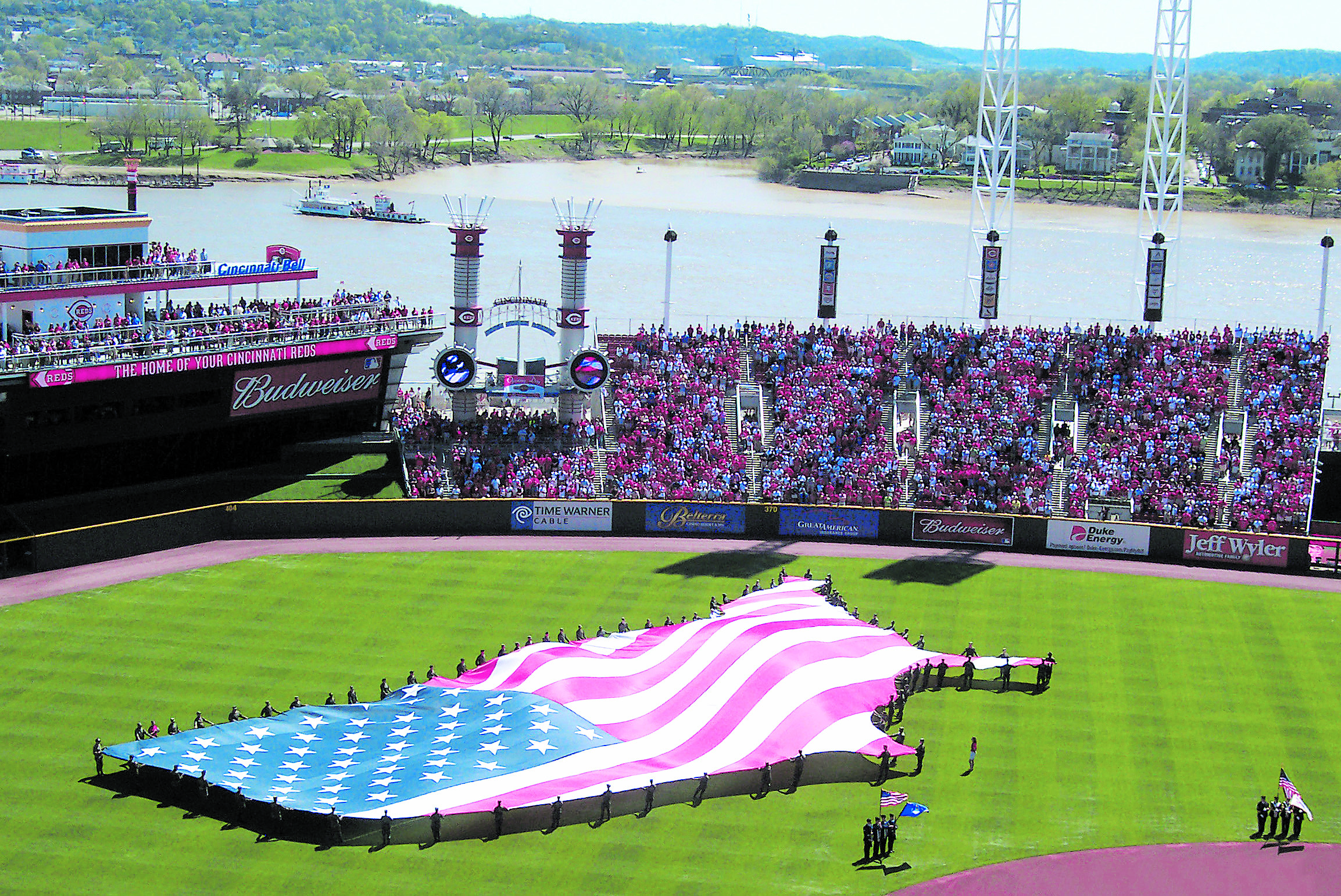
A total of 85 members from Wright-Patterson AFB hold the American flag during the singing of the national anthem April 2 at the Cincinnati Reds-Chicago Cubs opening day baseball game.

The 2007 Cincinnati Reds season was the 138th season for the franchise in Major League Baseball, and their fifth season at Great American Ball Park in Cincinnati. The Reds failed on a bid to win the National League Central, falling out of serious contention by midseason and finishing in fifth place with a 72–90 record.

Following an 11–7 loss to the St. Louis Cardinals on July 1, general manager Wayne Krivsky fired manager Jerry Narron and named advance scout Pete Mackanin interim manager. It was the second managerial change of the day, following the resignation of Seattle Mariners skipper Mike Hargrove. The Reds won Mackanin's first game at the helm, 7–3 over the San Francisco Giants on the strength of a grand slam by Brandon Phillips.

The season also included highlights such as the Reds 2004 first-round draft pick, right-handed starting pitcher Homer Bailey making his MLB debut against the Indians on June 8. He pitched 5 innings, gave up 2 earned runs, struck out 3, and walked 4.

== Offseason ==
- November 20, 2006: Mike Stanton was signed as a free agent.
- December 7, 2006: Josh Hamilton was purchased by the Reds from the Chicago Cubs.
- December 7, 2006: Jared Burton was drafted by the Reds from the Oakland Athletics in the 2006 rule 5 draft.

== Regular season ==
=== Season standings ===
==== National League Central ====
NL Central
Team	W	L	Pct.	GB	Home	Road
Chicago Cubs	85	77	.525	—	44‍–‍37	41‍–‍40
Milwaukee Brewers	83	79	.512	2	51‍–‍30	32‍–‍49
St. Louis Cardinals	78	84	.481	7	43‍–‍38	35‍–‍46
Houston Astros	73	89	.451	12	42‍–‍39	31‍–‍50
Cincinnati Reds	72	90	.444	13	39‍–‍42	33‍–‍48
Pittsburgh Pirates	68	94	.420	17	37‍–‍44	31‍–‍50

==== Record vs. opponents ====
2007 National League record Source: MLB Standings Grid – 2007
Team	AZ	ATL	CHC	CIN	COL	FLA	HOU	LAD	MIL	NYM	PHI	PIT	SD	SF	STL	WAS	AL
Arizona	—	4–2	4–2	2–4	8–10	6–1	5–2	8–10	2–5	3–4	5–1	5–4	10–8	10–8	4–3	6–1	8–7
Atlanta	2–4	—	5–4	1–6	4–2	10–8	3–3	4–3	5–2	9–9	9–9	5–1	5–2	4–3	3–4	11–7	4–11
Chicago	2–4	4–5	—	9–9	5–2	0–6	8–7	2–5	9–6	2–5	3–4	8–7	3–5	5–2	11–5	6–1	8–4
Cincinnati	4–2	6–1	9–9	—	2–4	4–3	4–11	2–4	8–7	2–5	2–4	9–7	2–4	4–3	6–9	1–6	7-11
Colorado	10–8	2–4	2–5	4–2	—	3–3	3–4	12–6	4–2	4–2	4–3	4–3	11–8	10–8	3–4	4–3	10–8
Florida	1–6	8–10	6–0	3–4	3–3	—	2–3	4–3	2–5	7–11	9–9	3–4	3–4	1–6	2–4	8–10	9–9
Houston	2–5	3–3	7–8	11–4	4–3	3-2	—	4–3	5–13	2–5	3–3	5–10	4–3	2–4	7–9	2–5	9–9
Los Angeles	10–8	3–4	5–2	4–2	6–12	3–4	3–4	—	3–3	5–5	4–2	5–2	8–10	10–8	3–3	5–1	5–10
Milwaukee	5–2	2–5	6–9	7–8	2–4	5–2	13–5	3–3	—	2–4	3–4	10–6	2–5	4–5	7–8	4–2	8–7
New York	4–3	9–9	5–2	5–2	2–4	11–7	5–2	5–5	4–2	—	6–12	4–2	2–4	4–2	5–2	9–9	8–7
Philadelphia	1-5	9–9	4–3	4–2	3–4	9–9	3–3	2–4	4–3	12–6	—	4–2	4–3	4–4	6–3	12–6	8–7
Pittsburgh	4–5	1–5	7–8	7–9	3–4	4–3	10–5	2–5	6–10	2–4	2–4	—	1–6	4–2	6–12	4–2	5–10
San Diego	8–10	2–5	5–3	4–2	8–11	4–3	3–4	10–8	5–2	4–2	3–4	6–1	—	14–4	3–4	4–2	6–9
San Francisco	8–10	3–4	2–5	3–4	8–10	6–1	4–2	8–10	5–4	2–4	4–4	2–4	4–14	—	4–1	3–4	5–10
St. Louis	3–4	4–3	5–11	9–6	4–3	4-2	9–7	3–3	8–7	2–5	3–6	12–6	4–3	1–4	—	1–5	6–9
Washington	1–6	7–11	1–6	6–1	3–4	10-8	5–2	1–5	2–4	9–9	6–12	2–4	2–4	4–3	5–1	—	9–9

=== Roster ===
2007 Cincinnati Reds
Roster
Pitchers: 61 Bronson Arroyo; 34 Homer Bailey; 31 Matt Belisle; 45 Bill Bray; 51 Jared Burton; 56 Todd Coffey; 37 Rhéal Cormier; 40 Jon Coutlangus; 50 Phil Dumatrait; 36 Mike Gosling; 81 Eddie Guardado; 39 Aaron Harang; 37 Bobby Livingston; 28 Kyle Lohse; 38 Gary Majewski; 59 Marcus McBeth; 22 Eric Milton; 54 Elizardo Ramírez; 35 Kirk Saarloos; 53 Brad Salmon; 57 Víctor Santos; 64 Tom Shearn; 29 Mike Stanton; 52 Ricky Stone; 25 David Weathers	Catchers: 65 Ryan Hanigan; 23 Ryan Jorgensen; 23 Chad Moeller; 26 David Ross; 17 Javier Valentín; Infielders: 7 Mark Bellhorn; 15 Jorge Cantú; 9 Juan Castro; 19 Jeff Conine; 48 Enrique Cruz; 12 Edwin Encarnación; 2 Álex González; 21 Scott Hatteberg; 27 Jeff Keppinger; 58 Pedro López; 4 Brandon Phillips; 19 Joey Votto	Outfielders: 63 Buck Coats; 44 Adam Dunn; 16 Jason Ellison; 6 Ryan Freel; 3,42 Ken Griffey Jr.; 33 Josh Hamilton; 30 Norris Hopper; 15 DeWayne Wise	Manager: 46 Pete Mackanin; 41 Jerry Narron; Coaches: 55 Mark Berry (third base); 7 Bucky Dent (bench); 32 Billy Hatcher (first base); 47 Tom Hume (bullpen); 49 Brook Jacoby (hitting); 43 Dick Pole (pitching)

=== Game log ===
2007 game log
April

#	Date	Opponent	Score	Win	Loss	Save	Attendance	Record
1	April 2	Cubs	5–1	Harang (1–0)	Zambrano (0–1)		42,720	1–0
2	April 4	Cubs	4–1	Lilly (1–0)	Arroyo (0–1)	Dempster (1)	25,965	1–1
3	April 5	Cubs	5–2	Santos (1–0)	Howry (0–1)	Weathers (1)	25,070	2–1
4	April 6	Pirates	6–1	Belisle (1–0)	Maholm (0–1)		17,837	3–1
5	April 7	Pirates	7–5	Harang (2–0)	Armas (0–1)	Weathers (2)	15,825	4–1
6	April 8	Pirates	6–3	Duke (1–0)	Milton (0–1)	Torres (4)	14,001	4–2
7	April 9	@ D-backs	3–2	Lyon (1–0)	Saarloos (0–1)	Valverde (4)	41,803	4–3
8	April 10	@ D-backs	5–4 (11)	Cruz (2–0)	Weathers (0–1)		21,225	4–4
9	April 11	@ D-backs	3–2	Belisle (2–0)	Owings (1–1)	Weathers (3)	19,534	5–4
10	April 13	@ Cubs	6–5	Coffey (1–0)	Zambrano (1–2)	Weathers (4)	37,267	6–4
11	April 14	@ Cubs	7–0	Hill (2–0)	Arroyo (0–2)		38,598	6–5
12	April 15	@ Cubs	1–0	Lohse (1–0)	Lilly (1–1)	Weathers (5)	39,820	7–5
13	April 16	Brewers	10–6	Capuano (2–0)	Milton (0–2)		12,521	7–6
14	April 17	Brewers	11–5	Stanton (1–0)	Shouse (1–1)		14,492	8–6
15	April 18	Astros	7–2	Sampson (2–0)	Coffey (1–1)		13,772	8–7
16	April 19	Astros	8–6	Lidge (1–0)	Weathers (0–2)	Wheeler (3)	14,222	8–8
17	April 20	Phillies	2–1 (10)	Coutlangus (1–0)	Gordon (0–1)		32,962	9–8
18	April 21	Phillies	4–1	Hamels (1–0)	Milton (0–3)		39,353	9–9
19	April 22	Phillies	9–3	García (1–1)	Belisle (2–1)		29,717	9–10
20	April 24	@ Cardinals	10–3	Harang (3–0)	Wells (1–4)		42,309	10–10
21	April 25	@ Cardinals	5–2	Flores (1–0)	Saarloos (0–2)	Isringhausen (5)	42,225	10–11
22	April 26	@ Cardinals	7–5	Springer (1–0)	Lohse (1–1)	Isringhausen (6)	42,503	10–12
23	April 27	@ Pirates	3–1	Snell (2–1)	Milton (0–4)	Torres (7)	22,638	10–13
24	April 28	@ Pirates	8–1	Belisle (3–1)	Gorzellany (3–1)		29,514	11–13
25	April 29	@ Pirates	9–5	Harang (4–0)	Maholm (1–3)		18,409	12–13

May

#	Date	Opponent	Score	Win	Loss	Save	Attendance	Record
26	May 1	@ Astros	11–2	Arroyo (1–2)	Albers (0–1)		30,361	13–13
27	May 2	@ Astros	3–1	Oswalt (4–2)	Lohse (1–2)	Wheeler (4)	29,468	13–14
28	May 3	@ Astros	7–5	Qualls (3–1)	Stanton (1–1)	Wheeler (5)	29,931	13–15
29	May 4	Rockies	6–5 (11)	Bautista (2–0)	Stanton (1–2)	Fuentes (6)	23,920	13–16
30	May 5	Rockies	9–7	Cook (1–1)	Harang (4–1)	Fuentes (7)	26,663	13–17
31	May 6	Rockies	9–3	Arroyo (2–2)	Fogg (1–3)	Weathers (6)	27,915	14–17
32	May 7	Astros	5–4	Oswalt (5–2)	Lohse (1–3)	Wheeler (6)	17,362	14–18
33	May 8	Astros	7–6	Lidge (2–0)	Salmon (0–1)	Wheeler (7)	16,264	14–19
34	May 9	Astros	3–2	Williams (1–5)	Belisle (3–2)	Wheeler (8)	16,278	14–20
35	May 10	Astros	9–5	Harang (5–1)	Albers (1–2)	Weathers (7)	25,796	15–20
36	May 11	@ Dodgers	2–0	Wolf (4–3)	Arroyo (2–3)	Saito (11)	49,588	15–21
37	May 12	@ Dodgers	7–3	Penny (5–0)	Lohse (1–4)		51,776	15–22
38	May 13	@ Dodgers	10–5	Broxton (2–1)	Saarloos (0–3)		41,399	15–23
39	May 14	@ Padres	7–1	Maddux (3–2)	Belisle (3–3)		20,262	15–24
40	May 15	@ Padres	2–1 (12)	Weathers (1–2)	Bell (0–2)		26,694	16–24
41	May 16	@ Padres	3–2	Hoffman (2–2)	Arroyo (2–4)		23,856	16–25
42	May 18	@ Indians	9–4	Lee (2–0)	Lohse (1–5)		34,230	16–26
43	May 19	@ Indians	10–5	Belisle (4–3)	Sowers (0–4)	Weathers (8)	35,262	17–26
44	May 20	@ Indians	5–3	Byrd (4–1)	Harang (5–2)	Borowski (13)	32,524	17–27
45	May 21	Nationals	8–7	Coutlangus (2–0)	Rauch (2–1)	Weathers (9)	15,271	18–27
46	May 22	Nationals	8–4	Colomé (4–0)	Coutlangus (2–1)		16,732	18–28
47	May 23	Nationals	12–7	Simontacchi (2–2)	Lohse (1–6)		31,971	18–29
48	May 24	Nationals	4–3	Bacsik (1–0)	Belisle (4–4)	Cordero (6)	19,541	18–30
49	May 25	Pirates	10–4 (10)	Bayliss (4–2)	Weathers (1–3)		36,455	18–31
50	May 26	Pirates	9–5	Grabow (1–1)	Arroyo (2–5)		32,280	18–32
51	May 27	Pirates	14–10	Duke (2–5)	Saarloos (0–4)		27,209	18–33
52	May 28	Pirates	4–0	Lohse (2–6)	Snell (4–4)		17,905	19–33
53	May 29	@ Astros	2–1	Belisle (5–4)	Qualls (4–2)	Weathers (10)	33,565	20–33
54	May 30	@ Astros	4–3	Harang (6–2)	Rodríguez (2–5)		31,904	21–33
55	May 31	@ Astros	10–2	Williams (2–7)	Arroyo (2–6)		30,336	21–34

June

#	Date	Opponent	Score	Win	Loss	Save	Attendance	Record
56	June 1	@ Rockies	4–2	Livingston (1–0)	Buchholz (2–3)	Weathers (12)	22,265	22–34
57	June 2	@ Rockies	4–1	Francis (5–4)	Lohse (2–7)	Fuentes (16)	30,076	22–35
58	June 3	@ Rockies	10–9 (10)	Corpas (2–2)	Santos (1–1)		26,071	22–36
59	June 5	@ Cardinals	4–3	Isringhausen (3–0)	Burton (0–1)		43,532	22–37
60	June 6	@ Cardinals	6–4	Johnson (1–0)	Arroyo (2–7)	Isringhausen (14)	42,029	22–38
61	June 7	@ Cardinals	5–1	Lohse (3–7)	Wainwright (4–5)		43,597	23–38
62	June 8	Indians	4–3	Bailey (1–0)	Lee (2–4)	Weathers (12)	38,696	24–38
63	June 9	Indians	8–6 (11)	Mastny (4–2)	Santos (1–2)	Borowski (18)	37,935	24–39
64	June 10	Indians	1–0 (12)	McBeth (1–0)	Miller (0–1)		30,842	25–39
65	June 12	Angels	5–3	Coutlangus (3–1)	Moseley (4–1)	Weathers (13)	23,153	26–39
66	June 13	Angels	6–3	Lackey (10–4)	Lohse (3–8)	Rodríguez (20)	29,655	26–40
67	June 14	Angels	9–7	Colón (6–2)	Majewski (0–1)	Rodríguez (21)	32,860	26–41
68	June 15	Rangers	7–6	Padilla (3–8)	Belisle (5–5)	Gagné (7)	27,747	26–42
69	June 16	Rangers	8–4	Harang (7–2)	Wright (0–1)		37,413	27–42
70	June 17	Rangers	11–4	Millwood (3–6)	Arroyo (2–8)		31,162	27–43
71	June 18	@ Athletics	6–1	Blanton (7–4)	Lohse (3–9)		16,466	27–44
72	June 19	@ Athletics	5–2	Bailey (2–0)	Gaudin (6–2)	Weathers (14)	19,351	28–44
73	June 20	@ Athletics	5–3	Haren (9–2)	McBeth (1–1)	Embree (8)	25,872	28–45
74	June 22	@ Mariners	16–1	Harang (8–2)	Feierabend (1–2)		46,340	29–45
75	June 23	@ Mariners	9–1	Washburn (6–6)	Lohse (3–10)		45,939	29–46
76	June 24	@ Mariners	3–2	O'Flaherty (4–0)	Arroyo (2–9)	Putz (21)	46,064	29–47
77	June 26	@ Phillies	11–4	Kendrick (2–0)	Bailey (2–1)		35,314	29–48
78	June 27	@ Phillies	9–6	McBeth (2–1)	Sanches (1–1)	Weathers (15)	31,803	30–48
79	June 28	@ Phillies	8–7 (10)	Condrey (3–0)	Santos (1–3)		44,323	30–49
80	June 29	Cardinals	4–2	Percival (1–0)	McBeth (2–2)	Isringhausen (15)	35,508	30–50
81	June 30	Cardinals	5–1	Lohse (4–10)	Wainwright (6–7)		32,538	31–50

July

#	Date	Opponent	Score	Win	Loss	Save	Attendance	Record
82	July 1	Cardinals	11–7	Percival (2–0)	Bailey (2–2)		24,126	31–51
83	July 3	Giants	7–3	Harang (9–2)	Correia (1–4)		37,299	32–51
84	July 4	Giants	9–5	Cain (3–9)	Belisle (5–6)		24,092	32–52
85	July 5	Giants	6–3	Arroyo (3–9)	Morris (7–5)	Weathers (16)	30,080	33–52
86	July 6	D-backs	8–1	Lohse (5–10)	Owings (5–4)		20,445	34–52
87	July 7	D-backs	5–4	Coutlangus (4–1)	Peña (3–2)	Weathers (17)	34,410	35–52
88	July 8	D-backs	4–3 (11)	Saarloos (1–4)	Valverde (0–3)		28,169	36–52
89	July 12	@ Mets	3–2	Hernández (5–4)	Arroyo (3–10)	Wagner (18)	48,282	36–53
90	July 13	@ Mets	8–4	Harang (10–2)	Maine (10–5)		51,305	37–53
91	July 14	@ Mets	2–1	Glavine (8–6)	Stanton (1–3)	Wagner (19)	51,742	37–54
92	July 15	@ Mets	5–2	Pérez (8–6)	Lohse (5–11)	Wagner (20)	52,186	37–55
93	July 16	@ Braves	10–3	Livingston (2–0)	Davies (4–8)		24,442	38–55
94	July 17	@ Braves	6–5	Arroyo (4–10)	Reyes (0–1)	Weathers (18)	30,072	39–55
95	July 18	@ Braves	6–5 (15)	Gosling (1–0)	Ascanio (0–1)		33,789	40–55
96	July 19	@ Marlins	7–5	Coffey (2–1)	Benítez (2–5)	Weathers (19)	10,344	41–55
97	July 20	@ Marlins	10–2	Olsen (8–7)	Lohse (5–12)		15,313	41–56
98	July 21	@ Marlins	11–1	Kim (5–5)	Livingston (2–1)		21,823	41–57
99	July 22	@ Marlins	9–3	Pinto (2–3)	Arroyo (4–11)		14,123	41–58
100	July 23	Brewers	2–1 (12)	Burton (1–1)	Balfour (0–2)		23,489	42–58
101	July 24	Brewers	5–3	Gallardo (3–1)	Belisle (5–7)	Cordero (32)	18,284	42–59
102	July 25	Brewers	7–3	Lohse (6–12)	Suppan (8–9)	Weathers (20)	30,976	43–59
103	July 26	Brewers	6–5 (10)	Burton (2–1)	Cordero (0–3)		24,170	44–59
104	July 27	Cubs	5–4	Weathers (2–3)	Howry (5–6)		36,635	45–59
105	July 28	Cubs	8–1	Marshall (5–4)	Harang (10–3)		42,365	45–60
106	July 29	Cubs	6–0	Zambrano (14–7)	Belisle (5–8)		33,061	45–61
107	July 31	@ Nationals	6–3	Chico (5–6)	Livingston (2–2)	Cordero (22)	20,165	45–62

August

#	Date	Opponent	Score	Win	Loss	Save	Attendance	Record
108	August 1	@ Nationals	7–2	Lannan (1–0)	Arroyo (4–12)		28,944	45–63
109	August 2	@ Nationals	7–3	Bacsik (5–6)	Dumatrait (0–1)		26,223	45–64
110	August 3	@ Pirates	13–4	Belisle (6–8)	Snell (7–10)		22,874	46–64
111	August 4	@ Pirates	9–8 (10)	Burton (3–1)	Capps (4–5)	Weathers (21)	33,466	47–64
112	August 7	Dodgers	4–0	Arroyo (5–12)	Hendrickson (4–6)		22,057	48–64
113	August 8	Dodgers	1–0	Harang (11–3)	Billingsley (7–3)	Weathers (22)	20,462	49–64
114	August 9	Dodgers	5–4 (11)	Proctor (3–5)	Santos (1–4)	Saito (28)	25,965	49–65
115	August 10	Padres	12–7 (11)	Cameron (1–0)	Weathers (2–4)		21,594	49–66
116	August 11	Padres	8–3	Livingston (3–2)	Hampson (2–3)		27,381	50–66
117	August 12	Padres	10–4	Peavy (13–5)	Arroyo (5–13)		31,297	50–67
118	August 14	@ Cubs	6–5	Harang (12–3)	Zambrano (14–9)	Weathers (23)	40,750	51–67
119	August 15	@ Cubs	11–9	Bray (1–0)	Howry (5–7)	Weathers (24)	40,162	52–67
120	August 16	@ Cubs	12–4	Marquis (10–7)	Livingston (3–3)		40,372	52–68
121	August 17	@ Brewers	8–3	Arroyo (6–13)	Suppan (8–10)		41,008	53–68
122	August 18	@ Brewers	8–4	Vargas (10–4)	Ramírez (0–1)		43,087	53–69
123	August 19	@ Brewers	7–6	Bray (2–0)	Linebrink (4–4)	Weathers (25)	42,398	54–69
124	August 20	Braves	14–4	Hudson (15–5)	Dumatrait (0–2)		24,477	54–70
125	August 21	Braves	8–7	Bray (3–0)	Moylan (4–3)	Weathers (26)	21,039	55–70
126	August 22	Braves	4–2	Arroyo (7–13)	Cormier (0–4)	Weathers (27)	22,924	56–70
127	August 23	Braves	9–7 (12)	Gosling (2–0)	Wickman (3–3)		22,052	57–70
128	August 24	Marlins	5–3	Harang (13–3)	Willis (8–13)	Weathers (28)	25,773	58–70
129	August 25	Marlins	11–7	Belisle (7–8)	Mitre (5–7)		32,288	59–70
130	August 26	Marlins	9–3	Shearn (1–0)	Barone (0–2)		23,122	60–70
131	August 28	@ Pirates	6–4	Gorzelanny (13–7)	Ramírez (0–2)	Capps (14)		60–71
132	August 28	@ Pirates	3–2	Chacón (5–4)	Bray (3–1)	Capps (15)	17,669	60–72
133	August 29	@ Pirates	8–0	Harang (14–3)	Snell (8–11)		14,191	61–72
134	August 30	@ Pirates	5–4	Burton (4–1)	Capps (4–6)	Weathers (29)	12,643	62–72
135	August 31	@ Cardinals	8–5	Flores (2–0)	Majewski (0–2)		43,564	62–73

September

#	Date	Opponent	Score	Win	Loss	Save	Attendance	Record
136	September 1	@ Cardinals	11–3	Wainwright (13–9)	Dumatrait (0–3)		42,356	62–74
137	September 2	@ Cardinals	3–2	Looper (12–10)	Arroyo (7–14)	Isringhausen (28)	44,223	62–75
138	September 3	Mets	10–4	Martínez (1–0)	Harang (14–4)		29,290	62–76
139	September 4	Mets	11–7	Pérez (13–9)	Bray (3–2)		20,655	62–77
140	September 5	Mets	7–0	Shearn (2–0)	Maine (14–9)		15,704	63–77
141	September 7	Brewers	11–4	Arroyo (8–14)	Bush (11–10)		21,006	64–77
142	September 8	Brewers	4–3	Turnbow (4–4)	Weathers (2–5)	Cordero (41)	22,758	64–78
143	September 9	Brewers	10–5	Sheets (12–4)	Dumatrait (0–4)		21,534	64–79
144	September 11	Cardinals	7–2	Belisle (8–8)	Mulder (0–2)		14,027	65–79
145	September 12	Cardinals	5–1	Arroyo (9–14)	Reyes (2–14)		16,167	66–79
146	September 13	Cardinals	5–4	Harang (15–4)	Wells (6–17)	Weathers (30)	18,018	67–79
147	September 14	@ Brewers	6–5	Shearn (3–0)	Sheets (12–5)	Bray (1)	42,944	68–79
148	September 15	@ Brewers	5–3	Suppan (10–11)	Saarloos (1–5)	Cordero (42)	40,710	68–80
149	September 16	@ Brewers	5–2	Villanueva (8–4)	Belisle (8–9)	Cordero (43)	31,150	68–81
150	September 17	@ Cubs	7–6	Ohman (2–4)	Weathers (2–6)		39,075	68–82
151	September 18	@ Cubs	5–2	Harang (16–4)	Zambrano (16–13)	Weathers (31)	40,801	69–82
152	September 19	@ Cubs	3–2	Howry (6–7)	Majewski (0–3)		40,805	69–83
153	September 20	@ Giants	4–2	Bailey (3–2)	Cain (7–16)	Weathers (32)	35,019	70–83
154	September 21	@ Giants	9–8 (11)	McBeth (3–2)	Munter (1–1)	Weathers (33)	35,502	71–83
155	September 22	@ Giants	2–0	Hennessey (4–5)	Bray (3–3)	Wilson (5)	36,375	71–84
156	September 23	@ Giants	5–4	Messenger (2–4)	Harang (16–5)	Wilson (6)	38,029	71–85
157	September 25	Astros	8–5	Paulino (1–1)	Coutlangus (4–2)	Lidge (17)	13,261	71–86
158	September 26	Astros	7–6	Sarfate (1–0)	Burton (4–2)	Qualls (5)	13,138	71–87
159	September 27	Astros	4–3	Borkowski (5–3)	Majewski (0–4)	Lidge (18)	13,626	71–88
160	September 28	Cubs	6–0	Zambrano (18–13)	Arroyo (9–15)		32,193	71–89
161	September 29	Cubs	4–0	Hill (11–8)	Harang (16–6)		38,936	71–90
162	September 30	Cubs	8–4	Bailey (4–2)	Dempster (2–7)		32,620	72–90

== Player stats ==
=== Batting ===
==== Starters by position ====
Note: Pos = Position; G = Games played; AB = At bats; H = Hits; Avg. = Batting average; HR = Home runs; RBI = Runs batted in

Pos	Player	G	AB	H	Avg.	HR	RBI
C	David Ross	112	311	63	.203	17	39
1B	Scott Hatteberg	116	361	112	.310	10	47
2B	Brandon Phillips	158	650	187	.288	30	94
SS	Álex González	110	393	107	.272	16	55
3B	Edwin Encarnación	139	502	145	.289	16	76
LF	Adam Dunn	152	522	138	.264	40	106
CF	Josh Hamilton	90	298	87	.292	19	47
RF	Ken Griffey Jr.	144	528	146	.277	30	93

==== Other batters ====
Note: G = Games played; AB = At bats; H = Hits; Avg. = Batting average; HR = Home runs; RBI = Runs batted in

Player	G	AB	H	Avg.	HR	RBI
Norris Hopper	121	307	101	.329	0	14
Ryan Freel	75	277	68	.245	3	16
Javier Valentín	97	243	67	.276	2	34
Jeff Keppinger	67	241	80	.332	5	32
Jeff Conine	80	215	57	.265	6	32
Juan Castro	54	89	16	.180	0	5
Joey Votto	24	84	27	.321	4	17
Jorge Cantú	27	57	17	.298	1	9
Jason Ellison	37	48	9	.188	1	2
Chad Moeller	30	48	8	.167	1	2
Pedro López	14	45	8	.178	0	0
Buck Coats	20	34	7	.206	0	2
Ryan Jorgensen	4	15	3	.200	2	6
Mark Bellhorn	13	14	1	.071	0	1
Ryan Hanigan	5	10	3	.300	0	2
DeWayne Wise	5	5	1	.200	0	1
Enrique Cruz	1	1	0	.000	0	0
Jerry Gil	1	0	0	----	0	0

=== Pitching ===
==== Starting pitchers ====
Note: G = Games pitched; IP = Innings pitched; W = Wins; L = Losses; ERA = Earned run average; SO = Strikeouts

Player	G	IP	W	L	ERA	SO
Aaron Harang	34	231.2	16	6	3.73	218
Bronson Arroyo	34	210.2	4	15	4.23	156
Matt Belisle	30	177.2	8	9	5.32	125
Kyle Lohse	21	131.2	6	12	4.58	80
Bobby Livingston	10	56.1	3	3	5.27	27
Homer Bailey	9	45.1	4	2	5.76	28
Tom Shearn	7	32.2	3	0	4.96	16
Eric Milton	6	31.1	0	4	5.17	18
Phil Dumatrait	6	18.0	0	4	15.00	9
Elizardo Ramírez	4	16.1	0	2	7.71	8

==== Relief pitchers ====
Note: G = Games pitched; W = Wins; L = Losses; SV = Saves; ERA = Earned run average; SO = Strikeouts

Player	G	W	L	SV	ERA	SO
David Weathers	70	2	6	33	3.59	48
Mike Stanton	69	1	3	0	5.93	40
Jon Coutlangus	64	4	2	0	4.39	38
Todd Coffey	58	2	1	0	5.82	43
Jared Burton	47	4	2	0	2.51	36
Kirk Saarloos	34	1	5	0	7.17	27
Víctor Santos	32	1	4	0	5.14	44
Gary Majewski	32	0	4	0	8.22	10
Brad Salmon	26	0	1	0	4.13	22
Mike Gosling	23	2	0	0	4.91	32
Marcus McBeth	23	3	2	0	5.95	17
Bill Bray	19	3	3	1	6.28	14
Eddie Guardado	15	0	0	0	7.24	8
Rhéal Cormier	6	0	0	0	9.00	1
Ricky Stone	5	0	0	0	10.13	3

== Farm system ==
Level	Team	League	Manager
AAA	Louisville Bats	International League	Rick Sweet
AA	Chattanooga Lookouts	Southern League	Jayhawk Owens
A	Sarasota Reds	Florida State League	Joe Ayrault
A	Dayton Dragons	Midwest League	Donnie Scott
Rookie	GCL Reds	Gulf Coast League	Pat Kelly, Rick Burleson and Ronnie Ortegon
Rookie	Billings Mustangs	Pioneer League	Joe Kruzel and Freddie Benavides
