= 2007 New York Mets season =

2007 New York Mets
- League: National League
- Division: East
- Ballpark: Shea Stadium
- City: New York
- Record: 88–74 (.543)
- Divisional place: 2nd
- Owner: Fred Wilpon
- General manager: Omar Minaya
- Manager: Willie Randolph
- Television: SportsNet New York; WPIX (CW 11); Gary Cohen, Ron Darling, Keith Hernandez, Ralph Kiner, Matt Yallof, Lee Mazzilli
- Radio: WFAN; Howie Rose, Ed Coleman, Tom McCarthy; WADO (Spanish)

The 2007 New York Mets season was the 46th season of the New York Mets in Major League Baseball, their 43rd at Shea Stadium, their full fifth under owner Fred Wilpon, and their third under manager Willie Randolph. The Mets were defending their first divisional championship since 1988. While the Atlanta Braves were counted as possible competition, the Philadelphia Phillies were predicted as the front-runners, albeit by their own star shortstop, Jimmy Rollins. Ultimately, Rollins' prediction rang true, as the Phillies won the National League East title on the last day of the regular season. With a seven-game division lead on September 12, the Mets suffered a historic collapse by losing 12 of their last 17 games and missing the postseason.

== 2006 offseason ==
The Mets' high hopes for the 2006 postseason were thwarted on September 29, 2006, when it was announced that ace Pedro Martínez was done for the remainder of the year due to a left calf muscle strain. Later it was announced that Pedro would have to undergo rotator cuff surgery and would miss a sizable portion of the 2007 season. On October 3, the day before his game 1 NLDS start, it was announced that Orlando Hernández tweaked his right calf muscle while jogging in the outfield at Shea. He wouldn't be able to pitch again until the 2007 season.

Coming into the 2006 offseason, it was clear that the team's biggest need was pitching. Pedro would return, but his condition upon returning was a major question mark. El-Duque was a question mark with his age and veteran Steve Trachsel guaranteed his departure with a Game 3 NLCS meltdown. Omar Minaya, the Mets' General Manager, made it clear that his first order of business concerned their in-house free agents including: Tom Glavine, Orlando Hernández, and Chad Bradford. The Mets also went hard after Japanese SP Daisuke Matsuzaka. On November 14, the Boston Red Sox outbid the Mets $51.1 million to $39 million for negotiating rights to Matsuzaka. Also on this day, the Mets tendered contracts to Orlando Hernández and 37-year-old José Valentín. Two days later 37-year-old Damion Easley was acquired as a fourth outfielder and to occasionally spell Valentín at second base. 40-year-old slugger Moisés Alou was signed to replace Cliff Floyd in left field. On December 1, with the hopes of winning his 300th game, Tom Glavine signed a single year contract. The Mets also had their eyes on free agent SP Barry Zito who eventually ended up with the San Francisco Giants after signing the largest contract ever for a pitcher at the time in MLB history. Former All-Star pitcher Chan Ho Park was also signed but lasted only one poor start before being released.

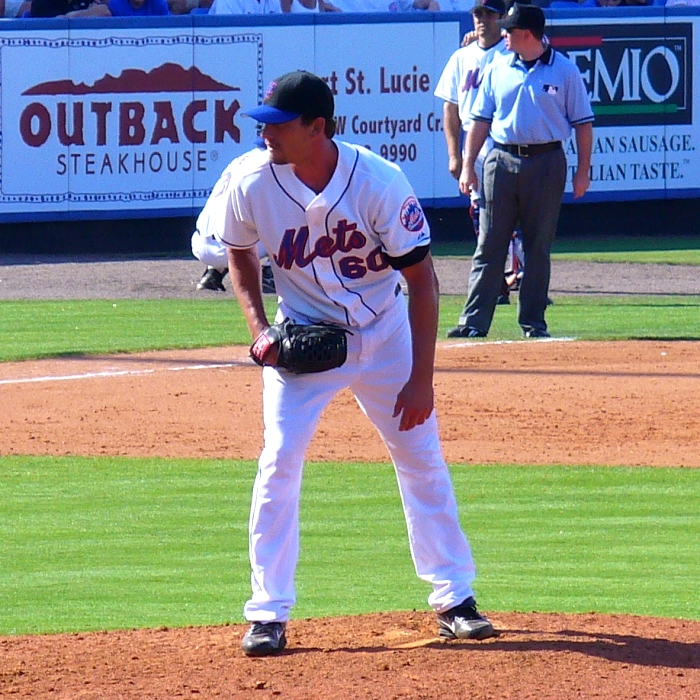
Scott Schoeneweis with the Mets in 2007

The biggest changes took place in the bullpen. The Mets lost Chad Bradford, Roberto Hernández, and Darren Oliver to free agency. The Mets also initiated a series of questionable moves where young bullpen arms were traded away Heath Bell and Royce Ring were packaged in a deal to the San Diego Padres for outfielder Ben Johnson and reliever Jon Adkins. Hard throwers Henry Owens and Matt Lindstrom were traded to the Florida Marlins for lefties Jason Vargas and Adam Bostick. Serviceable starter Brian Bannister was traded to the Kansas City Royals for the 23-year-old flame thrower Ambiorix Burgos. The worst news came with the loss of pitchers Duaner Sánchez and Juan Padilla. Sánchez, who had recovered from a mid-2006 taxicab accident and signed a new contract, was sidelined after reinjuring his shoulder during spring training. In addition, newly signed Guillermo Mota was suspended for the first 50 games of the regular season for steroid use. The Mets were forced to rely on mainstays Billy Wagner, Aaron Heilman, and Pedro Feliciano in addition to new acquisitions: veteran reliever Scott Schoeneweis and veteran starter-turned-reliever Aaron Sele. The remaining spots were populated by rookie Joe Smith and Ambiorix Burgos.

The 2007 Mets began the season much older and untested than the 2006 team. The starting pitching wasn't improved. Old veterans Tom Glavine and Orlando Hernández appeared at the top of the rotation followed by question marks: John Maine and Óliver Pérez. It was unknown how healthy Glavine and Hernández would be by the end of the season. It was also unknown if Maine and Pérez would continue to improve after their postseason successes and if they could handle the load of pitching a full season. The fifth spot was given to rookie Mike Pelfrey. The lineup also aged dramatically with the inclusion of Alou and Easley to a roster already containing Julio Franco, José Valentín, Carlos Delgado, and Paul Lo Duca. The bullpen lost valuable arms in Chad Bradford, Darren Oliver, and Duaner Sánchez. By the time it became apparent that Sánchez and Padilla would be unable to pitch, the Mets had already traded away Heath Bell and Henry Owens. Both had the experience and ability to step in and contribute on a major league level.

== Regular season ==
The season started similarly to 2006 for the Mets as they swept the season-opening series against the defending world champion St. Louis Cardinals and winning their first four games by a combined score of 31–3; in doing so, the Mets joined the 1978 Brewers as the only teams in major league history to win their first four games by a margin of at least 28 runs. Unlike 2006, the Atlanta Braves stayed close throughout April and even held sole possession of first place at the end of the month. Also unlike 2006, the Mets were led by an unlikely hero, John Maine, who was undefeated and named the National League Pitcher of the Month for April. David Wright hit only .244 with no home runs and six RBI in April but carried over a hitting streak from 2006 that reached a franchise record 26 games.

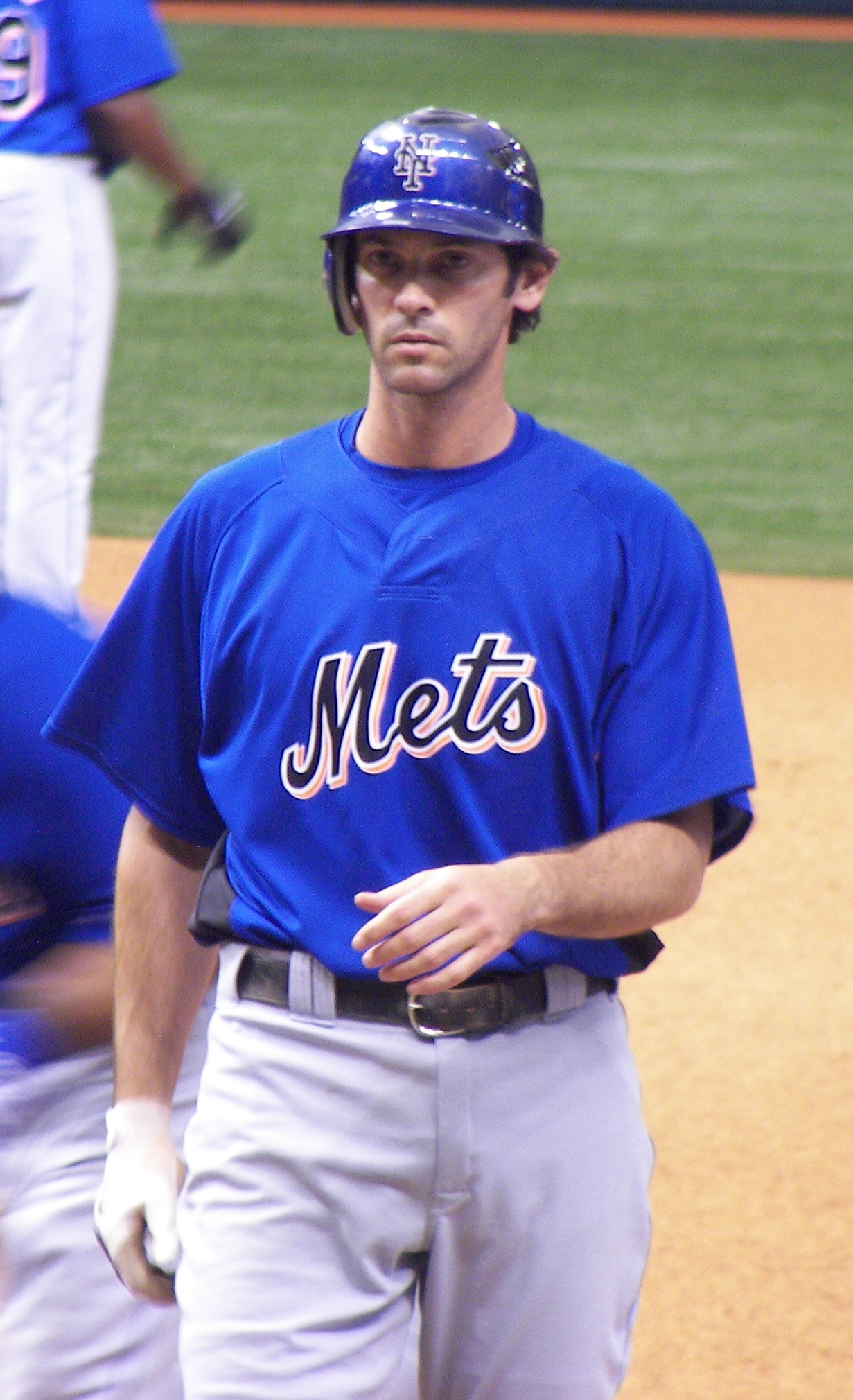
Shawn Green with the Mets in 2007

New York followed their strong April with an even stronger May. Jorge Sosa replaced Pelfrey in the starting rotation and compiled a 4–1 record for the month. His 8–1 win on May 16 put the Mets in first place where they remained until the last week of the season. Wright led the offense in May with eight home runs and 22 RBI. The Mets went 19–9 in May and finished the month with a 4 1/2-game lead despite starting second baseman José Valentín out for the entire month with an injury and starting outfielders Moisés Alou and Shawn Green missing time as well.

As the calendar turned to June, the Mets began slumping, losing six straight series against teams with winning records, the last four series part of a stretch of 18 straight games against 2006 playoff teams, facing the Detroit Tigers, Los Angeles Dodgers, New York Yankees, Minnesota Twins, Oakland Athletics, and St. Louis Cardinals, becoming the first team in MLB history to play six consecutive series against six different teams that made the playoffs the previous season. This stretch started poorly for the Mets, as they lost 9 out of 12 to the Tigers, Dodgers, Yankees, and Twins. However, they turned it around and won 5 out of 6 against the Athletics and Cardinals to finish this stretch. The Mets entered the All-Star break with 48 wins and 39 losses, with a slim lead over the second-place Atlanta Braves. The Mets acquired Luis Castillo and Jeff Conine before the playoff roster deadline of September 1 to fill holes that were created due to injuries. On July 12, 2007, Julio Franco was released by the Mets.

Shortstop José Reyes was mentioned at mid-season as a possible MVP. Pedro Martínez notched his 3,000th strikeout, and Tom Glavine got his 300th win. The team went into Wrigley Field in August and took two of three from the NL Central's first place Chicago Cubs, then beat up on the NL West's first place Arizona Diamondbacks a week later. Despite being swept by the second place Philadelphia Phillies in a four-game series in Philadelphia on August 27–30 (during which the Mets saw their six-game lead evaporate to two), the Mets won nine out of their next ten games, and everything was seemingly going the Mets' way. On September 12, the Mets were 21 games over .500 with a record of 83–62. Over the last three weeks of the baseball season, they won only five games.

Pedro Martínez returned to the Mets starting rotation in time for the September playoff deadline. As of September 17, the Mets were in first place in the NL East with an 83–66 record and a 2 1/2-game lead over the charging Phillies. They had lost four in a row, including a three-game sweep by the Phillies. Moisés Alou, as of September 17 had a 21-game hitting streak.

Down the stretch, the Mets played poorly including losing five out of six games with the fourth-place Washington Nationals. They lost on September 28 to fall into second place for the first time in over four months but pulled back into a tie with the Phillies the next day. On September 30, the Mets faced the Florida Marlins with hopes of winning the National League East or at least playing in a tiebreaker for division or the wild card. Tom Glavine surrendered 7 runs in the first inning as the Mets fell 8–1. The Phillies capped their miraculous comeback with a 6–1 victory over the Nationals to win the NL East. The 2007 Mets collapse is one of the worst in baseball history, mirroring "the Phold" of 1964, where the Phillies lost a 6 1/2-game lead in the last twelve games. The Mets, who had come back in 1969 against improbable odds to beat out the Cubs, now found themselves on the other side of the equation, coincidentally, against a team in the Phillies that in 1964 had pulled a similar collapse.

The 2007 Mets finished the season with a record of 88 wins and 74 losses. They placed second in the NL East, and third in the Wild Card standings.

=== Season standings ===
==== National League East ====
NL East
Team	W	L	Pct.	GB	Home	Road
Philadelphia Phillies	89	73	.549	—	47‍–‍34	42‍–‍39
New York Mets	88	74	.543	1	41‍–‍40	47‍–‍34
Atlanta Braves	84	78	.519	5	44‍–‍37	40‍–‍41
Washington Nationals	73	89	.451	16	40‍–‍41	33‍–‍48
Florida Marlins	71	91	.438	18	36‍–‍45	35‍–‍46

==== Record vs. opponents ====
2007 National League record Source: MLB Standings Grid – 2007
Team	AZ	ATL	CHC	CIN	COL	FLA	HOU	LAD	MIL	NYM	PHI	PIT	SD	SF	STL	WAS	AL
Arizona	—	4–2	4–2	2–4	8–10	6–1	5–2	8–10	2–5	3–4	5–1	5–4	10–8	10–8	4–3	6–1	8–7
Atlanta	2–4	—	5–4	1–6	4–2	10–8	3–3	4–3	5–2	9–9	9–9	5–1	5–2	4–3	3–4	11–7	4–11
Chicago	2–4	4–5	—	9–9	5–2	0–6	8–7	2–5	9–6	2–5	3–4	8–7	3–5	5–2	11–5	6–1	8–4
Cincinnati	4–2	6–1	9–9	—	2–4	4–3	4–11	2–4	8–7	2–5	2–4	9–7	2–4	4–3	6–9	1–6	7-11
Colorado	10–8	2–4	2–5	4–2	—	3–3	3–4	12–6	4–2	4–2	4–3	4–3	11–8	10–8	3–4	4–3	10–8
Florida	1–6	8–10	6–0	3–4	3–3	—	2–3	4–3	2–5	7–11	9–9	3–4	3–4	1–6	2–4	8–10	9–9
Houston	2–5	3–3	7–8	11–4	4–3	3-2	—	4–3	5–13	2–5	3–3	5–10	4–3	2–4	7–9	2–5	9–9
Los Angeles	10–8	3–4	5–2	4–2	6–12	3–4	3–4	—	3–3	5–5	4–2	5–2	8–10	10–8	3–3	5–1	5–10
Milwaukee	5–2	2–5	6–9	7–8	2–4	5–2	13–5	3–3	—	2–4	3–4	10–6	2–5	4–5	7–8	4–2	8–7
New York	4–3	9–9	5–2	5–2	2–4	11–7	5–2	5–5	4–2	—	6–12	4–2	2–4	4–2	5–2	9–9	8–7
Philadelphia	1-5	9–9	4–3	4–2	3–4	9–9	3–3	2–4	4–3	12–6	—	4–2	4–3	4–4	6–3	12–6	8–7
Pittsburgh	4–5	1–5	7–8	7–9	3–4	4–3	10–5	2–5	6–10	2–4	2–4	—	1–6	4–2	6–12	4–2	5–10
San Diego	8–10	2–5	5–3	4–2	8–11	4–3	3–4	10–8	5–2	4–2	3–4	6–1	—	14–4	3–4	4–2	6–9
San Francisco	8–10	3–4	2–5	3–4	8–10	6–1	4–2	8–10	5–4	2–4	4–4	2–4	4–14	—	4–1	3–4	5–10
St. Louis	3–4	4–3	5–11	9–6	4–3	4-2	9–7	3–3	8–7	2–5	3–6	12–6	4–3	1–4	—	1–5	6–9
Washington	1–6	7–11	1–6	6–1	3–4	10-8	5–2	1–5	2–4	9–9	6–12	2–4	2–4	4–3	5–1	—	9–9

=== Roster ===
2007 New York Mets
Roster
Pitchers: 39 Jon Adkins; 40 Ambiorix Burgos; 36 Willie Collazo; 25 Pedro Feliciano; 47 Tom Glavine; 48 Aaron Heilman; 26 Orlando Hernández; 49 Philip Humber; 54 Brian Lawrence; 33 John Maine; 45 Pedro Martínez; 59 Guillermo Mota; 38 Carlos Muñiz; 61 Chan Ho Park; 34 Mike Pelfrey; 46 Óliver Pérez; 60 Scott Schoeneweis; 30 Aaron Sele; 35 Joe Smith; 29 Jorge Sosa; 19 Lino Urdaneta; 43 Jason Vargas; 13 Billy Wagner; 32 Dave Williams	Catchers: 19,28 Sandy Alomar Jr.; 11 Ramón Castro; 9 Mike DiFelice; 16 Paul Lo Duca; Infielders: 1 Luis Castillo; 28,19 Jeff Conine; 21 Carlos Delgado; 3 Damion Easley; 23 Julio Franco; 6 Rubén Gotay; 1,4 Anderson Hernández; 7 José Reyes; 22 José Valentín; 5 David Wright	Outfielders: 18 Moisés Alou; 36 Chip Ambres; 23 Marlon Anderson; 15 Carlos Beltrán; 10 Endy Chávez; 27 Carlos Gómez; 20 Shawn Green; 4 Ben Johnson; 9 Ricky Ledée; 44 Lastings Milledge; 17 David Newhan	Manager: 12 Willie Randolph; Coaches: 2 Sandy Alomar Sr. (third base); 56 Guy Conti (bullpen); 54 Rick Down (hitting); 24 Rickey Henderson (first base); 52 Howard Johnson (first base / hitting); 53 Jerry Manuel (bench); 55 Tom Nieto (catching); 51 Rick Peterson (pitching)

=== Game log ===
2007 game log
April (15–9)

#	Date	Opponent	Score	Win	Loss	Save	Attendance	Record
1	April 1	@ Cardinals	6–1	Glavine (1–0)	Carpenter (0–1)		45,429	1–0
2	April 3	@ Cardinals	4–1	Hernández (1–0)	Wells (0–1)	Wagner (1)	45,440	2–0
3	April 4	@ Cardinals	10–0	Maine (1–0)	Looper (0–1)		45,423	3–0
4	April 6	@ Braves	11–1	Pérez (1–0)	Redman (0–1)		51,014	4–0
5	April 7	@ Braves	5–3	Smoltz (1–0)	Glavine (1–1)	Wickman (2)	43,156	4–1
6	April 8	@ Braves	3–2	Soriano (1–0)	Heilman (0–1)	Wickman (3)	24,832	4–2
7	April 9	Phillies	11–5	Feliciano (1–0)	Geary (0–1)		56,227	5–2
8	April 11	Phillies	5–2	Eaton (1–1)	Pérez (1–1)	Gordon (1)	41,927	5–3
9	April 12	Phillies	5–3	Glavine (2–1)	Moyer (1–1)	Wagner (2)	33,355	6–3
10	April 13	Nationals	3–2	Heilman (1–1)	Wagner (0–1)	Wagner (3)	47,311	7–3
11	April 14	Nationals	6–2	Hill (1–1)	Hernández (1–1)		53,560	7–4
–	April 15	Nationals	Postponed (rain) Rescheduled for July 28					7–4
–	April 16	@ Phillies	Postponed (rain) Rescheduled for June 29					7–4
12	April 17	@ Phillies	8–1	Glavine (3–1)	García (0–1)		27,058	8–4
13	April 18	@ Marlins	9–2	Maine (2–0)	Willis (3–1)		17,219	9–4
14	April 19	@ Marlins	11–3	Hernández (2–1)	VandenHurk (0–1)		11,815	10–4
15	April 20	Braves	7–3	Hudson (3–0)	Pelfrey (0–1)		47,547	10–5
16	April 21	Braves	7–2	Pérez (2–1)	James (2–2)		55,143	11–5
17	April 22	Braves	9–6	Yates (1–0)	Heilman (1–2)	Wickman (6)	55,671	11–6
18	April 23	Rockies	6–1	Maine (3–0)	Buchholz (1–1)		32,154	12–6
19	April 24	Rockies	2–1 (12)	Smith (1–0)	Speier (0–1)		38,500	13–6
20	April 25	Rockies	11–5	Fogg (1–1)	Pelfrey (0–2)		33,522	13–7
21	April 27	@ Nationals	4–3	Chico (2–2)	Pérez (2–2)	Cordero (3)	21,662	13–8
22	April 28	@ Nationals	6–2 (12)	Sele (1–0)	Rivera (0–1)		29,292	14–8
23	April 29	@ Nationals	1–0	Maine (4–0)	Bergmann (0–2)	Wagner (4)	27,361	15–8
24	April 30	Marlins	9–6	Olsen (3–1)	Park (0–1)	Owens (2)	39,383	15–9

May (19–9)

#	Date	Opponent	Score	Win	Loss	Save	Attendance	Record
25	May 1	Marlins	5–2	Nolasco (1–0)	Pelfrey (0–3)	Owens (3)	48,458	15–10
26	May 2	Marlins	6–3	Pérez (3–2)	Sánchez (2–1)	Wagner (5)	25,236	16–10
27	May 3	@ D-backs	9–4	Heilman (2–2)	Valverde (0–2)		19,710	17–10
28	May 4	@ D-backs	5–3	Maine (5–0)	Johnson (0–2)	Wagner (6)	26,268	18–10
29	May 5	@ D-backs	6–2	Sosa (1–0)	Webb (2–2)		30,339	19–10
30	May 6	@ D-backs	3–1	Hernández (3–1)	Pelfrey (0–4)	Valverde (11)	35,363	19–11
31	May 7	@ Giants	9–4	Zito (3–3)	Pérez (3–3)		37,365	19–12
32	May 8	@ Giants	4–1	Glavine (4–1)	Cain (1–3)	Wagner (7)	39,455	20–12
33	May 9	@ Giants	5–3	Heilman (3–2)	Benítez (0–1)	Wagner (8)	41,832	21–12
34	May 11	Brewers	5–4	Sosa (2–0)	Suppan (5–3)	Wagner (9)	40,126	22–12
35	May 12	Brewers	12–3	Sheets (3–2)	Pelfrey (0–5)		50,193	22–13
36	May 13	Brewers	9–1	Pérez (4–3)	Capuano (5–1)		51,427	23–13
37	May 14	Cubs	5–4	Heilman (4–2)	Wuertz (0–2)		34,033	24–13
38	May 15	Cubs	10–1	Zambrano (4–3)	Maine (5–1)		37,487	24–14
39	May 16	Cubs	8–1	Sosa (3–0)	Hill (4–3)		37,483	25–14
40	May 17	Cubs	6–5	Burgos (1–0)	Dempster (1–2)		42,667	26–14
41	May 18	Yankees	3–2	Pérez (5–3)	Pettitte (2–3)	Wagner (10)	56,337	27–14
42	May 19	Yankees	10–7	Glavine (5–1)	Rasner (1–3)		56,137	28–14
43	May 20	Yankees	6–2	Clippard (1–0)	Maine (5–2)		56,438	28–15
44	May 22	@ Braves	8–1	Davies (2–2)	Sosa (3–1)		32,587	28–16
45	May 23	@ Braves	3–0	Pérez (6–3)	James (4–4)	Wagner (11)	30,489	29–16
46	May 24	@ Braves	2–1	Smoltz (7–2)	Glavine (5–2)	Wickman (7)	36,660	29–17
47	May 25	@ Marlins	6–2	Heilman (5–2)	Pinto (0–2)		24,278	30–17
48	May 26	@ Marlins	7–2	Maine (6–2)	Obermueller (1–3)		34,505	31–17
49	May 27	@ Marlins	6–4	Sosa (4–1)	Olsen (4–4)	Wagner (12)	23,622	32–17
50	May 29	Giants	5–4 (12)	Smith (2–0)	Benítez (0–3)		47,940	33–17
51	May 30	Giants	3–0	Zito (5–5)	Glavine (5–3)	Hennessey (2)	41,395	33–18
52	May 31	Giants	4–2	Hernández (3–1)	Cain (2–5)	Wagner (13)	44,228	34–18

June (12–15)

#	Date	Opponent	Score	Win	Loss	Save	Attendance	Record
53	June 1	D-backs	5–1	Webb (5–3)	Maine (6–3)		40,230	34–19
54	June 2	D-backs	7–1	Sosa (5–1)	Hernández (5–3)		45,219	35–19
55	June 3	D-backs	4–1	Davis (4–6)	Pérez (6–4)	Valverde (20)	53,012	35–20
56	June 5	Phillies	4–2 (11)	Geary (1–1)	Felicinano (1–1)	Alfonseca (2)	43,078	35–21
57	June 6	Phillies	4–2	Eaton (6–4)	Heilman (5–3)	Alfonseca (3)	42,696	35–22
58	June 7	Phillies	6–3 (10)	Zagurski (1–0)	Schoeneweis (0–1)	Alfonseca (4)	43,398	35–23
59	June 8	@ Tigers	3–0	Sosa (6–1)	Durbin (5–2)	Wagner (14)	42,007	36–23
60	June 9	@ Tigers	8–7	Bonderman (6–0)	Pérez (6–5)	Jones (16)	42,364	36–24
61	June 10	@ Tigers	15–7	Miller (2–0)	Glavine (5–4)		40,914	36–25
62	June 11	@ Dodgers	5–3	Wolf (8–4)	Hernández (3–2)	Saito (17)	40,467	36–26
63	June 12	@ Dodgers	4–1	Kuo (1–1)	Maine (6–4)	Saito (18)	42,438	36–27
64	June 13	@ Dodgers	9–1	Penny (8–1)	Sosa (6–2)		46,894	36–28
65	June 15	@ Yankees	2–0	Pérez (7–5)	Clemens (1–1)	Wagner (15)	55,159	37–28
66	June 16	@ Yankees	11–7	Vizcaíno (3–1)	Glavine (5–5)		55,064	37–29
67	June 17	@ Yankees	8–2	Wang (5–4)	Hernández (3–3)		55,060	37–30
68	June 18	Twins	8–1	Maine (7–4)	Silva (4–8)		37,319	38–30
69	June 19	Twins	9–0	Santana (7–6)	Sosa (6–3)		40,935	38–31
70	June 20	Twins	6–2	Baker (2–2)	Pérez (7–6)		44,517	38–32
71	June 22	Athletics	9–1	Glavine (6–5)	DiNardo (2–4)		43,029	39–32
72	June 23	Athletics	1–0	Wagner (1–0)	Casilla (2–1)		52,920	40–32
73	June 24	Athletics	10–2	Maine (8–4)	Kennedy (2–5)		50,143	41–32
74	June 25	Cardinals	2–1 (11)	Heilman (6–3)	Springer (3–1)		40,075	42–32
75	June 26	Cardinals	5–3 (11)	Thompson (6–3)	Schoeneweis (0–2)	Flores (1)	40,053	42–33
76	June 27	Cardinals	2–0 (6)	Glavine (7–5)	Reyes (0–10)		40,948	43–33
–	June 28	Cardinals	Postponed (rain) Rescheduled for September 27					43–33
77	June 29	@ Phillies	6–5	Hernández (4–3)	Durbin (0–1)	Wagner (16)	35,849	44–33
78	June 29	@ Phillies	5–2	Maine (9–4)	Hamels (9–4)		45,165	45–33
79	June 30	@ Phillies	8–3	Sosa (7–3)	Happ (0–1)	Feliciano (1)	45,003	46–33

July (13–14)

#	Date	Opponent	Score	Win	Loss	Save	Attendance	Record
80	July 1	@ Phillies	5–3	Kendrick (2–0)	Pelfrey (0–6)	Alfonseca (6)	45,289	46–34
81	July 2	@ Rockies	6–2	Hirsh (4–7)	Glavine (7–6)		27,252	46–35
82	July 3	@ Rockies	11–3	Cook (5–5)	Vargas (0–1)		48,040	46–36
83	July 4	@ Rockies	17–7	Fogg (4–6)	Hernández (4–4)		48,123	46–37
84	July 5	@ Astros	6–2	Maine (10–4)	Jennings (1–4)		35,430	47–37
85	July 6	@ Astros	4–0	Rodríguez (6–7)	Pelfrey (0–7)		38,812	47–38
86	July 7	@ Astros	5–3 (17)	Sele (2–0)	Moehler (1–3)	Wagner (17)	41,596	48–38
87	July 8	@ Astros	8–3	Oswalt (8–5)	Williams (0–1)		40,708	48–39
88	July 12	Reds	3–2	Hernández (5–4)	Arroyo (3–10)	Wagner (18)	48,282	49–39
89	July 13	Reds	8–4	Harang (10–2)	Maine (10–5)		51,305	49–40
90	July 14	Reds	2–1	Glavine (8–6)	Stanton (1–3)	Wagner (19)	51,742	50–40
91	July 15	Reds	5–2	Pérez (8–6)	Lohse (5–11)	Wagner (20)	52,186	51–40
92	July 16	@ Padres	5–1	Wells (5–5)	Sosa (7–4)		35,802	51–41
93	July 17	@ Padres	7–0	Hernández (6–4)	Peavy (9–4)		31,660	52–41
94	July 18	@ Padres	5–4	Linebrink (3–2)	Smith (2–1)	Hoffman (26)	32,524	52–42
95	July 19	@ Dodgers	13–9	Sele (3–0)	Lowe (8–9)		51,651	53–42
96	July 20	@ Dodgers	4–1	Pérez (9–6)	Hernández (3–2)	Wagner (21)	52,103	54–42
97	July 21	@ Dodgers	8–6	Penny (12–1)	Sosa (7–5)	Broxton (2)	49,124	54–43
98	July 22	@ Dodgers	5–4 (10)	Feliciano (2–1)	Houlton (0–1)	Wagner (22)	49,092	55–43
99	July 24	Pirates	8–4	Maine (11–5)	Snell (7–8)		49,122	56–43
100	July 25	Pirates	6–3	Glavine (9–6)	Gorzelanny (9–6)	Wagner (23)	44,906	57–43
101	July 26	Pirates	8–4	Maholm (7–12)	Pérez (9–7)		52,150	57–44
102	July 27	Nationals	6–2	Bacsik (4–6)	Sosa (7–6)		51,179	57–45
103	July 28	Nationals	3–1	Hernández (7–4)	Rivera (4–3)	Wagner (24)	51,947	58–45
104	July 28	Nationals	6–5	Rauch (7–2)	Feliciano (2–2)	Cordero (21)	46,265	58–46
105	July 29	Nationals	5–0 (5)	Maine (12–5)	Traber (2–2)		47,264	59–46
106	July 31	@ Brewers	4–2 (13)	Bush (9–8)	Sele (3–1)		41,790	59–47

August (15–13)

#	Date	Opponent	Score	Win	Loss	Save	Attendance	Record
107	August 1	@ Brewers	8–5	Pérez (10–7)	Vargas (9–3)	Wagner (25)	42,058	60–47
108	August 2	@ Brewers	12–4	Lawrence (1–0)	Capuano (5–8)		41,704	61–47
109	August 3	@ Cubs	6–2	Mota (1–0)	Dempster (2–4)		41,512	62–47
110	August 4	@ Cubs	6–2	Lilly (12–5)	Maine (12–6)		41,412	62–48
111	August 5	@ Cubs	8–3	Glavine (10–6)	Marquis (8–7)		41,599	63–48
112	August 7	Braves	7–3	Carlyle (7–3)	Pérez (10–8)		52,177	63–49
113	August 8	Braves	4–3	Heilman (7–3)	Soriano (2–3)	Wagner (26)	51,749	64–49
114	August 9	Braves	7–6	Hudson (13–5)	Maine (12–7)	Villarreal (1)	52,425	64–50
115	August 10	Marlins	4–3	Lindstrom (2–3)	Wagner (1–1)	Gregg (25)	48,516	64–51
116	August 11	Marlins	7–5	Miller (4–0)	Heilman (7–4)	Gregg (26)	50,773	64–52
117	August 12	Marlins	10–4	Sosa (8–6)	Gardner (3–3)		51,023	65–52
118	August 14	@ Pirates	5–4	Sosa (9–6)	Torres (1–4)	Wagner (27)	25,277	66–52
119	August 15	@ Pirates	10–8	Maine (13–7)	Morris (7–8)	Wagner (28)	18,241	67–52
120	August 16	@ Pirates	10–7	Marte (1–0)	Heilman (7–5)	Capps (11)	36,447	67–53
121	August 17	@ Nationals	6–2	Glavine (11–6)	Chico (5–7)		23,636	68–53
122	August 18	@ Nationals	7–4	Pérez (11–8)	Lannan (1–2)	Wagner (29)	35,157	69–53
123	August 19	@ Nationals	8–2	Hernández (8–4)	Rauch (8–4)		29,092	70–53
124	August 21	Padres	7–6	Wagner (2–1)	Hoffman (2–4)		48,592	71–53
125	August 22	Padres	7–5	Peavy (14–5)	Lawrence (1–1)	Hoffman (32)	50,060	71–54
126	August 23	Padres	9–8 (10)	Hoffman (3–4)	Heilman (7–6)	Bell (1)	50,078	71–55
127	August 24	Dodgers	5–2	Pérez (12–8)	Penny (14–4)		53,250	72–55
128	August 25	Dodgers	4–3	Hernández (9–4)	Stults (1–2)	Heilman (1)	52,655	73–55
129	August 26	Dodgers	6–2	Wells (6–8)	Maine (13–8)		49,234	73–56
130	August 27	@ Phillies	9–2	Durbin (6–3)	Lawrence (1–2)		38,165	73–57
131	August 28	@ Phillies	4–2 (10)	Myers (3–5)	Mota (1–1)		40,508	73–58
132	August 29	@ Phillies	3–2	Moyer (12–10)	Pérez (12–9)	Myers (13)	43,150	73–59
133	August 30	@ Phillies	11–10	Gordon (2–2)	Wagner (2–2)		42,552	73–60
134	August 31	@ Braves	7–1	Maine (14–8)	Hudson (15–7)		45,245	74–60

September (14–14)

#	Date	Opponent	Score	Win	Loss	Save	Attendance	Record
135	September 1	@ Braves	5–1	Pelfrey (1–7)	James (9–10)	Feliciano (2)	45,611	75–60
136	September 2	@ Braves	3–2	Glavine (12–6)	Smoltz (12–7)	Wagner (30)	46,242	76–60
137	September 3	@ Reds	10–4	Martínez (1–0)	Harang (14–4)		29,290	77–60
138	September 4	@ Reds	11–7	Pérez (13–9)	Bray (3–2)		20,655	78–60
139	September 5	@ Reds	7–0	Shearn (2–0)	Maine (14–9)		15,704	78–61
140	September 7	Astros	11–3	Pelfrey (2–7)	Rodríguez (8–13)		51,113	79–61
141	September 8	Astros	3–1	Glavine (13–6)	Williams (8–14)	Wagner (31)	53,061	80–61
142	September 9	Astros	4–1	Martínez (2–0)	Oswalt (14–7)	Wagner (32)	51,847	81–61
143	September 10	Braves	3–2	Pérez (14–9)	Hudson (15–8)	Wagner (33)	48,557	82–61
144	September 11	Braves	13–5	Moylan (5–3)	Hernández (9–5)		48,732	82–62
145	September 12	Braves	4–3	Mota (2–1)	Acosta (0–1)	Wagner (34)	51,648	83–62
146	September 14	Phillies	3–2 (10)	Gordon (3–2)	Heilman (7–7)	Myers (16)	53,730	83–63
147	September 15	Phillies	5–3	Alfonseca (5–1)	Sosa (9–7)	Myers (17)	55,477	83–64
148	September 16	Phillies	10–6	Geary (3–2)	Mota (2–2)		52,779	83–65
149	September 17	@ Nationals	12–4	Albaladejo (1–0)	Sele (3–2)		18,678	83–66
150	September 18	@ Nationals	9–8	Colomé (5–1)	Maine (14–10)	Cordero (35)	19,966	83–67
151	September 19	@ Nationals	8–4	Pelfrey (3–7)	Chico (5–9)		20,558	84–67
152	September 20	@ Marlins	8–7 (10)	Tankersley (6–1)	Sosa (9–8)		15,132	84–68
153	September 21	@ Marlins	9–6	Martínez (3–0)	Olsen (9–15)	Schoeneweis (1)	25,666	85–68
154	September 22	@ Marlins	7–2	Pérez (15–9)	Kim (9–8)		22,517	86–68
155	September 23	@ Marlins	7–6 (11)	Smith (3–1)	García (0–1)	Schoeneweis (2)	17,130	87–68
156	September 24	Nationals	13–4	Chico (6–9)	Pelfrey (3–8)		49,164	87–69
157	September 25	Nationals	10–9	Bergmann (6–5)	Glavine (13–7)	Rauch (4)	49,244	87–70
158	September 26	Nationals	9–6	Hanrahan (5–3)	Smith (3–2)	Ayala (1)	51,940	87–71
159	September 27	Cardinals	3–0	Piñeiro (7–5)	Martínez (3–1)	Isringhausen (31)	48,900	87–72
160	September 28	Marlins	7–4	Kim (10–8)	Pérez (15–10)	Gregg (32)	55,298	87–73
161	September 29	Marlins	13–0	Maine (15–10)	Seddon (0–2)		54,675	88–73
162	September 30	Marlins	8–1	Kensing (3–0)	Glavine (13–8)		54,453	88–74

- Mets win
- Mets loss
- Eliminated

== Player stats ==
=== Batting ===
==== Starters by position ====
Note: Pos = Position; G = Games played; AB = At bats; H = Hits; Avg. = Batting average; HR = Home runs; RBI = Runs batted in

Pos	Player	G	AB	H	Avg.	HR	RBI
C	Paul Lo Duca	119	445	121	.272	9	54
1B	Carlos Delgado	139	538	139	.258	24	87
2B	Luis Castillo	50	199	59	.296	1	20
SS	José Reyes	160	681	191	.280	12	57
3B	David Wright	160	604	196	.325	30	107
LF	Moisés Alou	87	328	112	.341	13	49
CF	Carlos Beltrán	144	554	153	.276	33	112
RF	Shawn Green	130	446	130	.291	10	46

==== Other batters ====
Note: G = Games played; AB = At bats; H = Hits; Avg. = Batting average; HR = Home runs; RBI = Runs batted in

Player	G	AB	H	Avg.	HR	RBI
Damion Easley	76	193	54	.280	10	26
Rubén Gotay	98	190	56	.295	4	24
Lastings Milledge	59	184	50	.272	7	29
José Valentín	51	166	40	.241	3	18
Endy Chávez	71	150	43	.287	1	17
Ramón Castro	52	144	41	.285	11	31
Carlos Gómez	58	125	29	.232	2	12
David Newhan	56	74	15	.203	1	6
Marlon Anderson	43	69	22	.319	3	25
Julio Franco	40	50	10	.200	1	8
Jeff Conine	21	41	8	.195	0	5
Mike DiFelice	16	40	10	.250	0	5
Ricky Ledée	17	36	8	.222	1	6
Ben Johnson	9	27	5	.185	0	1
Sandy Alomar Jr.	8	22	3	.136	0	0
Anderson Hernández	4	3	1	.333	0	0
Chip Ambres	3	3	1	.333	0	1

=== Pitching ===
==== Starting pitchers ====
Note: G = Games pitched; IP = Innings pitched; W = Wins; L = Losses; ERA = Earned run average; SO = Strikeouts

Player	G	IP	W	L	ERA	SO
Tom Glavine	34	200.1	13	8	4.45	89
John Maine	32	191.0	15	10	3.91	180
Óliver Pérez	29	177.0	15	10	3.56	174
Orlando Hernández	27	147.2	9	5	3.72	128
Mike Pelfrey	15	72.2	3	8	5.57	45
Brian Lawrence	6	29.0	1	2	6.83	18
Pedro Martínez	5	28.0	3	1	2.57	32
Jason Vargas	2	10.1	0	1	12.19	4
Chan Ho Park	1	4.0	0	1	15.75	4

==== Other pitchers ====
Note: G = Games pitched; IP = Innings pitched; W= Wins; L= Losses; ERA = Earned run average; SO = Strikeouts

Player	G	IP	W	L	ERA	SO
Jorge Sosa	42	112.2	9	8	4.47	69
Philip Humber	3	7.0	0	0	7.71	2
Dave Williams	2	4.1	0	1	22.85	2

==== Relief pitchers ====
Note: G = Games pitched; W= Wins; L= Losses; SV = Saves; ERA = Earned run average; SO = Strikeouts

Player	G	W	L	SV	ERA	SO
Billy Wagner	66	2	2	34	2.63	80
Aaron Heilman	81	7	7	1	3.03	63
Pedro Feliciano	78	2	2	2	3.09	61
Scott Schoenweis	70	0	2	2	5.03	41
Joe Smith	54	3	2	0	3.45	45
Guillermo Mota	52	2	2	0	5.76	47
Aaron Sele	34	3	2	0	5.37	29
Ambiorix Burgos	17	1	0	0	3.42	19
Willie Collazo	6	0	0	0	6.35	0
Carlos Muñiz	2	0	0	0	7.71	2
Lino Urdaneta	2	0	0	0	9.00	0
Jon Adkins	1	0	0	0	0.00	0

== Farm system ==
Level	Team	League	Manager
AAA	New Orleans Zephyrs	Pacific Coast League	Ken Oberkfell
AA	Binghamton Mets	Eastern League	Mako Oliveras
A	St. Lucie Mets	Florida State League	Frank Cacciatore
A	Savannah Sand Gnats	South Atlantic League	Tim Teufel
A-Short Season	Brooklyn Cyclones	New York–Penn League	Edgar Alfonzo
Rookie	Kingsport Mets	Appalachian League	Donovan Mitchell
Rookie	GCL Mets	Gulf Coast League	Juan López

Preceded by 2006	New York Mets seasons 2007	Succeeded by 2008
