= Ortegon =

Ortegon is a Spanish surname. Notable people with the surname include:

- Julio César Ortegon (born 1968), Colombian racing cyclist
- Ronnie Ortegon (born 1966), American baseball player, coach, and manager
