= List of New York Mets seasons =

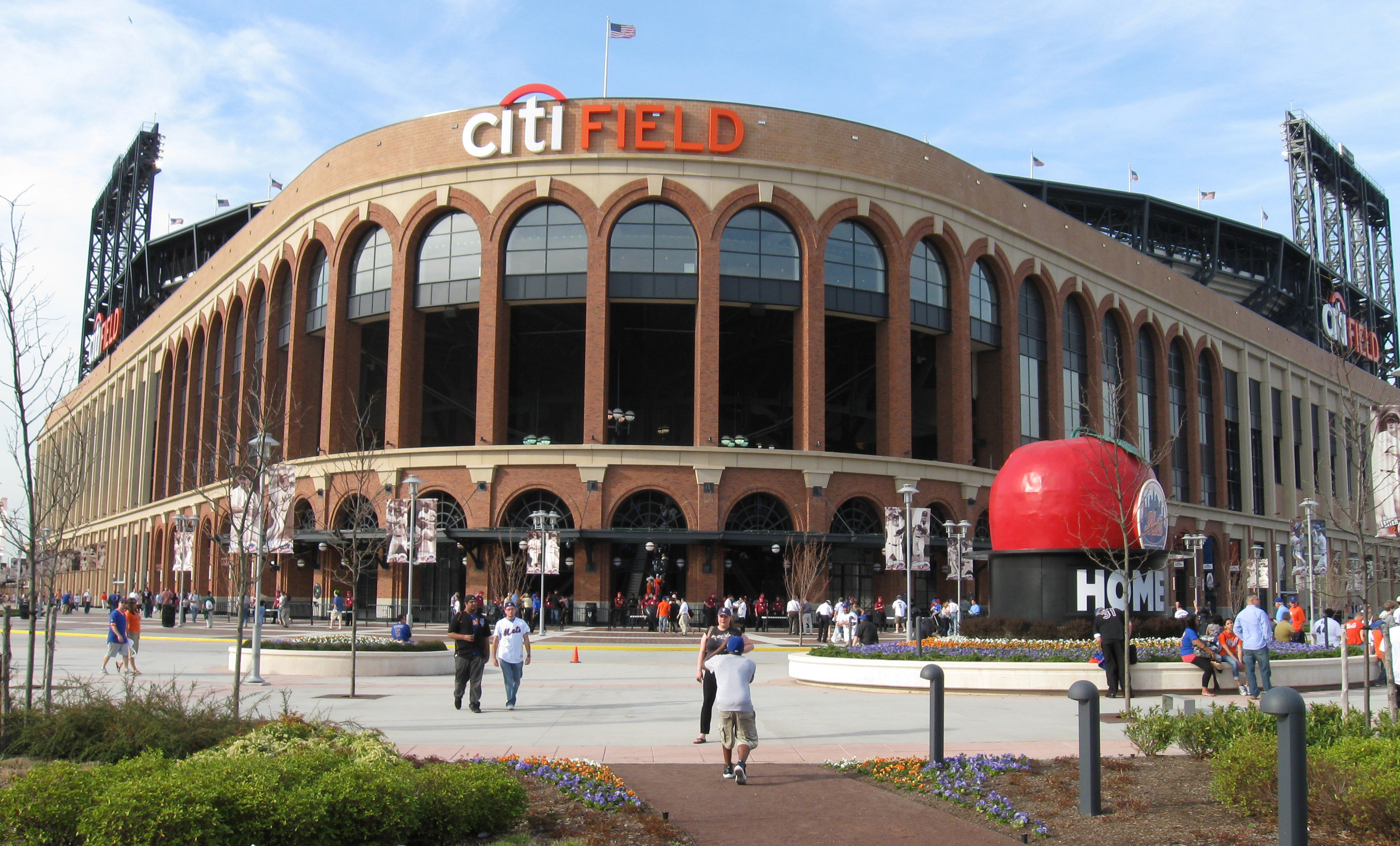
Citi Field is the home stadium of the Mets.

The New York Mets are an American professional baseball team based in Flushing, Queens, New York City. They compete in the East Division of Major League Baseball's (MLB) National League (NL). The team's current home stadium is Citi Field, after playing two years at the Polo Grounds and 45 years at Shea Stadium. Since their inception in 1962, the Mets have won two World Series titles and five NL championships. As of the end of the 2026 season, the Mets have won more than 4,900 regular season games, a total that ranks 20th among MLB teams and fourth among expansion teams.

The Mets lost 120 games in their inaugural season, the second-most by an MLB team behind the 2024 Chicago White Sox. After six more years in which their best league finish was ninth, the Mets won the World Series in 1969, defeating the Baltimore Orioles in five games to earn what is widely considered one of the biggest upsets in baseball history. Four seasons later, the Mets returned to the World Series, where they lost to the Oakland Athletics in seven games. After winning two NL championships in five years, New York struggled for the next decade, not coming within 10 games of the NL East leader until 1984.

In 1986, the team posted 108 wins, the most in franchise history, and defeated the Houston Astros in the National League Championship Series (NLCS) to advance to the World Series. Trailing three games to two in the series, the Mets were one out from defeat in game six before coming back to win 6–5; they won game seven two days later to earn their second World Series championship. After a second-place finish in 1987, the Mets won the NL East the next year, but lost to the Los Angeles Dodgers in the NLCS. The Mets' next playoff appearances were their back-to-back wild card-winning seasons of 1999 and 2000; in the latter year, they won their fourth NL championship, but lost to the cross-town New York Yankees in the "Subway Series". The 2006 Mets earned an NL East title, before the St. Louis Cardinals defeated them in the NLCS. In 2007 and 2008, the team was eliminated from playoff contention on the last day of the regular season. The Mets won the NL East in 2015, and swept the Chicago Cubs in four games to win the NLCS and advance to the World Series for the first time since 2000; they lost the Series to the Kansas City Royals in five games. The following year, they returned to the playoffs with a wild card berth, but lost the 2016 NL Wild Card Game to the San Francisco Giants. After reaching the National League Championship Series in 2024, the Mets missed the postseason in 2025 and 2026, the most recent seasons.

== Table key ==
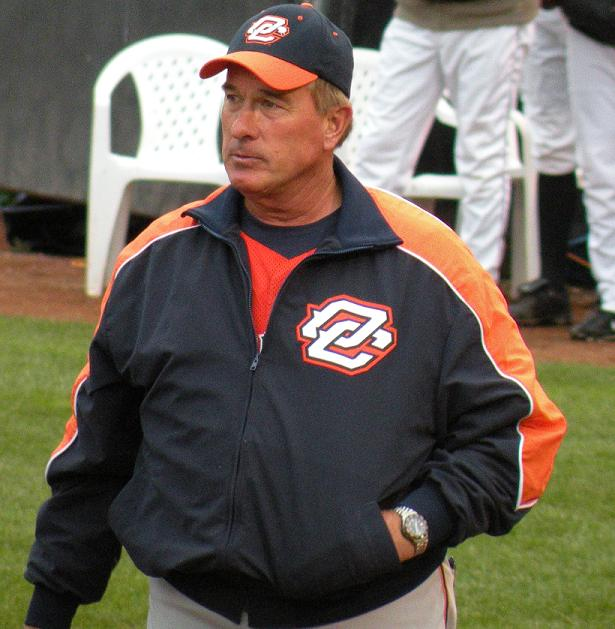
Catcher Gary Carter played six seasons for the Mets, and was a member of the 1986 World Series-winning team.

Legend for "Year by year" table below
Term	Meaning
ASGMVP	All-Star Game Most Valuable Player
CPOY	Comeback Player of the Year
CYA	Cy Young Award
Finish	Final position in league or division
GB	"Games back" from first-place team (Note: This is determined by calculating the difference in wins plus the difference in losses divided by two.)
Losses	Number of regular season losses
MLB season	Each year is linked to an article about that particular MLB season
MOY	Manager of the Year
NLCS	National League Championship Series
NLDS	National League Division Series
NLWC	National League Wild Card Game/Series
ROY	National League Rookie of the Year
RPOY	National League Reliever of the Year
Team season	Each year is linked to an article about that particular Mets season
Wins	Number of regular season wins
WSMVP	World Series Most Valuable Player Award

== Year by year ==
Note: Statistics are correct as of September 28, 2025.

World Series champions †	NL champions *	Division champions ^	Wild card berth (1995–present) ¤

MLB season	Team season	League	Division	Finish	Wins	Losses	Win%	GB	Postseason	Awards
1962	1962	NL	—	10th	40	120	.250	60½	—	—
1963	1963	NL	—	10th	51	111	.315	48	—	—
1964	1964	NL	—	10th	53	109	.327	40	—	—
1965	1965	NL	—	10th	50	112	.309	47	—	—
1966	1966	NL	—	9th	66	95	.410	28½	—	—
1967	1967	NL	—	10th	61	101	.377	40½	—	Tom Seaver (ROY)
1968	1968	NL	—	9th	73	89	.451	24	—	—
1969	1969^{†}	NL*	East (Note: In 1969, the National League split into East and West divisions.)^	1st	100	62	.617	—	Won NLCS (Atlanta Braves) 3–0; Won World Series (Baltimore Orioles) 4–1^{†}	Tom Seaver (CYA); Tommie Agee (CPOY); Donn Clendenon (WSMVP)
1970	1970	NL	East	3rd	83	79	.512	6	—	—
1971	1971	NL	East	3rd	83	79	.512	14	—	—
1972 (Note: The 1972 Major League Baseball strike forced the cancellation of the Mets' first six games of the season.)	1972	NL	East	3rd	83	73	.532	13½	—	Jon Matlack (ROY)
1973	1973	NL*	East^	1st	82	79	.509	—	Won NLCS (Cincinnati Reds) 3–2; Lost World Series (Oakland Athletics) 4–3*	Tom Seaver (CYA)
1974	1974	NL	East	5th	71	91	.438	17	—	—
1975	1975	NL	East	3rd	82	80	.506	10½	—	Tom Seaver (CYA); Jon Matlack (ASGMVP) (Note: Matlack and Bill Madlock were co-winners of the award.)
1976	1976	NL	East	3rd	86	76	.531	15	—	—
1977	1977	NL	East	6th	64	98	.395	37	—	—
1978	1978	NL	East	6th	66	96	.407	24	—	—
1979	1979	NL	East	6th	63	99	.389	35	—	—
1980	1980	NL	East	5th	67	95	.414	24	—	—
1981 (Note: The 1981 Major League Baseball strike caused the season to be split into two halves. The Mets finished with a 17–34 record in the first half of the season, and a fifth-place finish in the National League East. After the strike was resolved, the team had a 24–28 record in the second half, placing them fourth in the division.)	1981	NL	East	5th	41	62	.398	18½	—	—
1982	1982	NL	East	6th	65	97	.401	27	—	—
1983	1983	NL	East	6th	68	94	.420	22	—	Darryl Strawberry (ROY)
1984	1984	NL	East	2nd	90	72	.556	6½	—	Dwight Gooden (ROY)
1985	1985	NL	East	2nd	98	64	.605	3	—	Dwight Gooden (CYA)
1986	1986^{†}	NL*	East^	1st	108	54	.667	—	Won NLCS (Houston Astros) 4–2; Won World Series (Boston Red Sox) 4–3^{†}	Ray Knight (CPOY), (WSMVP)
1987	1987	NL	East	2nd	92	70	.568	3	—	—
1988	1988	NL	East^	1st	100	60	.625	—	Lost NLCS (Los Angeles Dodgers) 4–3	—
1989	1989	NL	East	2nd	87	75	.537	6	—	—
1990	1990	NL	East	2nd	91	71	.562	4	—	—
1991	1991	NL	East	5th	77	84	.478	20½	—	—
1992	1992	NL	East	5th	72	90	.444	24	—	—
1993	1993	NL	East	7th	59	103	.364	38	—	—
1994 (Note: The 1994–95 Major League Baseball strike, which started on August 12, led to the cancellation of the rest of the season.)	1994	NL	East	3rd	55	58	.487	18½	—	—
1995 (Note: The 1994–95 MLB strike lasted until April 2, causing the 1995 season to be shortened to 144 games.)	1995	NL	East	2nd	69	75	.479	21	—	—
1996	1996	NL	East	4th	71	91	.438	25	—	—
1997	1997	NL	East	3rd	88	74	.543	13	—	—
1998	1998	NL	East	2nd	88	74	.543	18	—	—
1999	1999	NL	East	2nd¤ (Note: The Mets finished the 1999 season tied with the Cincinnati Reds for the National League wild card playoff berth. In a one-game tie-breaker, the Mets defeated the Reds 5–0 to win the wild card.)¤	97	66	.595	6½	Won NLDS (Arizona Diamondbacks) 3–1; Lost NLCS (Atlanta Braves) 4–2	Rickey Henderson (CPOY)
2000	2000	NL*	East	2nd¤	94	68	.580	1	Won NLDS (San Francisco Giants) 3–1; Won NLCS (St. Louis Cardinals) 4–1; Lost World Series (New York Yankees) 4–1*	—
2001	2001	NL	East	3rd	82	80	.506	6	—	—
2002	2002	NL	East	5th	75	86	.466	26½	—	—
2003	2003	NL	East	5th	66	95	.410	34½	—	—
2004	2004	NL	East	4th	71	91	.438	25	—	—
2005	2005	NL	East	3rd	83	79	.512	7	—	—
2006	2006	NL	East^	1st	97	65	.599	—	Won NLDS (Los Angeles Dodgers) 3–0; Lost NLCS (St. Louis Cardinals) 4–3	—
2007	2007	NL	East	2nd	88	74	.543	1	—	—
2008	2008	NL	East	2nd	89	73	.549	3	—	Fernando Tatís (CPOY)
2009	2009	NL	East	4th	70	92	.432	23	—	—
2010	2010	NL	East	4th	79	83	.488	18	—	—
2011	2011	NL	East	4th	77	85	.475	25	—	—
2012	2012	NL	East	4th	74	88	.457	24	—	R. A. Dickey (CYA)
2013	2013	NL	East	3rd	74	88	.457	22	—	—
2014	2014	NL	East	T-2nd	79	83	.488	17	—	Jacob deGrom (ROY)
2015	2015	NL*	East^	1st	90	72	.556	—	Won NLDS (Los Angeles Dodgers) 3–2; Won NLCS (Chicago Cubs) 4–0; Lost World Series (Kansas City Royals) 4–1*	Matt Harvey (CPOY)
2016	2016	NL	East	2nd¤	87	75	.537	8	Lost NLWC (San Francisco Giants)	—
2017	2017	NL	East	4th	70	92	.432	27	—	—
2018	2018	NL	East	4th	77	85	.475	13	—	Jacob deGrom (CYA)
2019	2019	NL	East	3rd	86	76	.531	11	—	Jacob deGrom (CYA); Pete Alonso (ROY)
2020 (Note: The 2020 season was shortened to 60 games by the COVID-19 pandemic.)	2020	NL	East	T-4th	26	34	.433	9	—	—
2021	2021	NL	East	3rd	77	85	.475	11½	—	—
2022	2022	NL	East	2nd¤ (Note: The Mets finished the 2022 season tied with the Atlanta Braves in the NL East. Instead of playing a one-game tie-breaker as in years past, the division champion was decided by the teams' head-to-head records, which favored the Braves.)	101	61	.623	0	Lost NLWC (San Diego Padres) 2–1	Buck Showalter (MOY); Edwin Díaz (RPOY)
2023	2023	NL	East	4th	75	87	.463	29	—	—
2024	2024	NL	East	3rd¤ (Note: The Mets finished the 2024 season tied with the Atlanta Braves for second place in the NL East, and both teams finished tied with the Arizona Diamondbacks for the second and third NL wild-card berths. Since the Braves won both season series versus the Mets and Diamondbacks, Atlanta was awarded the second NL wild card. The Mets were awarded the third NL wild card, because they won their season series over the Diamondbacks, 4 games to 3.)	89	73	.549	6	Won NLWC (Milwaukee Brewers) 2–1; Won NLDS (Philadelphia Phillies) 3–1; Lost NLCS (Los Angeles Dodgers) 4–2	—
2025	2025	NL	East	2nd	83	79	.512	13	—	Edwin Díaz (RPOY)
2026	2026	NL	East	5th	74	88	.457	20	—	—

== All-time records ==
New York Mets all-time win–loss records
Statistic	Wins	Losses	Win%
New York Mets regular season record (1962–2026)	4,973	5,315	.483
New York Mets postseason record (1962–2026)	59	46	.562
All-time regular and postseason record	5,032	5,361	.484

== Record by decade ==
The following table describes the Mets' MLB win–loss record by decade.

Decade	Wins	Losses	Pct
1960s	494	799	.382
1970s	763	850	.473
1980s	816	743	.523
1990s	767	786	.494
2000s	815	803	.504
2010s	793	827	.490
2020s	525	507	.509
All-time	4,973	5,315	.483

These statistics are from Baseball-Reference.com's New York Mets Team History & Encyclopedia, and are current as of September 27, 2026.

== Postseason record by year ==
The Mets have made the postseason eleven times in their history. Their first appearance was in 1969 and the most recent was in 2024.

Year	Finish	Round	Opponent	Result		
1969	World Series Champions	NLCS	Atlanta Braves	Won	3	0
1969	World Series Champions	World Series	Baltimore Orioles	Won	4	1
1973	National League Champions	NLCS	Cincinnati Reds	Won	3	2
1973	National League Champions	World Series	Oakland Athletics	Lost	3	4
1986	World Series Champions	NLCS	Houston Astros	Won	4	2
1986	World Series Champions	World Series	Boston Red Sox	Won	4	3
1988	National East Champions	NLCS	Los Angeles Dodgers	Lost	3	4
1999	National League Wild Card	NLDS	Arizona Diamondbacks	Won	3	1
1999	National League Wild Card	NLCS	Atlanta Braves	Lost	2	4
2000	National League Champions	NLDS	San Francisco Giants	Won	3	1
2000	National League Champions	NLCS	St. Louis Cardinals	Won	4	1
2000	National League Champions	World Series	New York Yankees	Lost	1	4
2006	National League East Champions	NLDS	Los Angeles Dodgers	Won	3	0
2006	National League East Champions	NLCS	St. Louis Cardinals	Lost	3	4
2015	National League Champions	NLDS	Los Angeles Dodgers	Won	3	2
2015	National League Champions	NLCS	Chicago Cubs	Won	4	0
2015	National League Champions	World Series	Kansas City Royals	Lost	1	4
2016	National League Wild Card	Wild Card Game	San Francisco Giants	Lost	0	1
2022	National League Wild Card	Wild Card Series	San Diego Padres	Lost	1	2
2024	National League Wild Card	Wild Card Series	Milwaukee Brewers	Won	2	1
2024	National League Wild Card	NLDS	Philadelphia Phillies	Won	3	1
2024	National League Wild Card	NLCS	Los Angeles Dodgers	Lost	2	4
11	Totals			13–9	59	46
