= Jon Coutlangus =

American baseball player (born 1980)

Jonathan Coutlangus
- Relief pitcher
- Born: October 21, 1980 (age 45); Fort Lauderdale, Florida
- Batted: Left Threw: Left

MLB debut
- April 7, 2007, for the Cincinnati Reds

Last MLB appearance
- September 25, 2007, for the Cincinnati Reds

MLB statistics
- Win–loss record: 4–2
- Earned run average: 4.39
- Strikeouts: 38
- Stats at Baseball Reference

Teams
- Cincinnati Reds (2007)

Jonathan Thomas Coutlangus (born October 21, 1980) is an American baseball coach and former professional baseball player. He is currently an assistant coach at North Greenville University, and previously played in Major League Baseball for the Cincinnati Reds. Coutlangus played college baseball at the University of South Carolina with his current head coach, Landon Powell. Both were part of the Gamecocks' 56–10 season in 2000 and both played in the major leagues before coaching.

== Baseball career ==
Coutlangus was drafted in the 33rd round of the 2000 amateur draft, but did not sign. In 2003, the San Francisco Giants drafted Coutlangus in the 19th round. Originally drafted as an outfielder, he was batting just .194 in 71 games with the Hagerstown Suns in 2004. The Suns then converted him to a pitcher. Coutlangus was claimed off waivers by the Cincinnati Reds on March 31, 2006 and played in the minor leagues with the Chattanooga Lookouts and Louisville Bats.

Coutlangus made his major league debut in 2007. After being designated for assignment at the end of spring training, Coutlangus was traded to the Diamondbacks on April 7, 2008, but never played in the major leagues again.

== Coaching career ==
He is now the pitching coach for the North Greenville University baseball team in Greenville, South Carolina, coached by Powell, and part of the Ray Tanner coaching tree.
