= Mike Gosling =

American baseball player (born 1980)

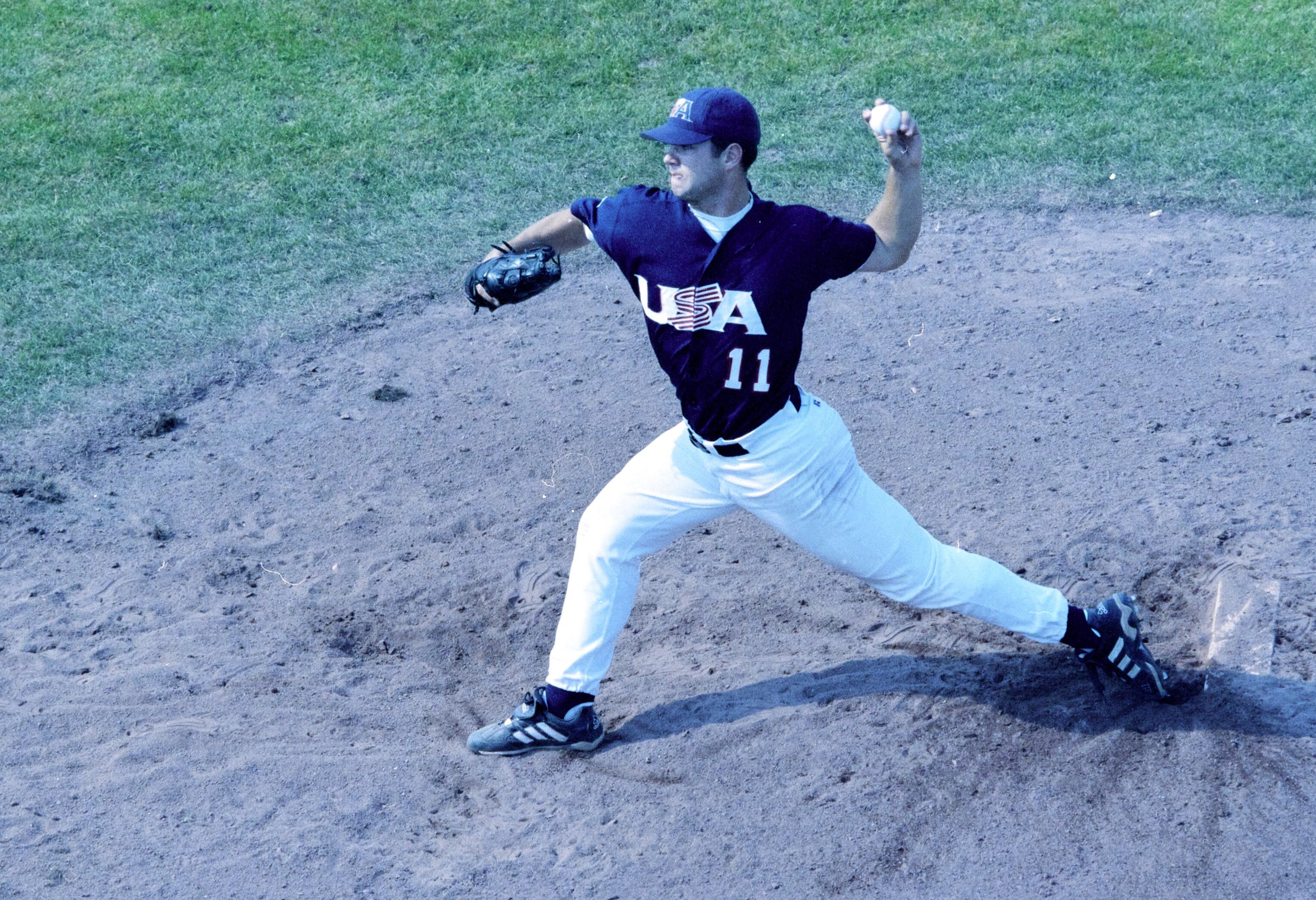
- Gosling in 2000
- Pitcher
- Born: September 23, 1980 (age 45); Madison, Wisconsin, U.S.
- Batted: Left Threw: Left

MLB debut
- September 9, 2004, for the Arizona Diamondbacks

Last MLB appearance
- October 3, 2009, for the Cleveland Indians

MLB statistics
- Win–loss record: 3–4
- Earned run average: 4.85
- Strikeouts: 74
- Stats at Baseball Reference

Teams
- Arizona Diamondbacks (2004–2005); Cincinnati Reds (2006–2007); Cleveland Indians (2009)

Michael Frederick Gosling (born September 23, 1980) is an American former baseball left-handed pitcher who played for the Arizona Diamondbacks, Cincinnati Reds, and Cleveland Indians in Major League Baseball (MLB) from 2004 to 2009. He played college baseball for the Stanford Cardinal before the Diamondbacks drafted him in the second round of the 2001 MLB draft.

== Amateur career ==
Gosling attended East High School in Salt Lake City, Utah and was the Utah baseball Gatorade Player of the Year in 1998.

Gosling was drafted out of high school by the Minnesota Twins in the 14th round of the 1998 Major League Baseball draft but chose to go to college at Stanford University. In three years pitching for the Stanford Cardinal, he had a 10–7 record, a 4.40 ERA and three saves in 178 innings. He went 0–3 in the 2001 NCAA baseball tournament.

In 1998, he played collegiate summer baseball with the Anchorage Glacier Pilots of the Alaska Baseball League. In 1999, he played for the Orleans Cardinals of the Cape Cod Baseball League. In 2000, he pitched for the United States national collegiate team, winning the Haarlem Baseball Week tournament. He was 1–0 with a 2.76 ERA and 34 strikeouts in 16 1/3 innings as a reliever for the national team.

== Professional career ==
=== Arizona Diamondbacks ===
The Arizona Diamondbacks selected Gosling in the second round of the 2001 Major League Baseball draft. He signed with Arizona on August 1 and pitched in the Arizona Fall League. In 2002, he led the Texas League with 14 wins with the El Paso Diablos in Double-A. After shoulder surgery in September 2003 to repair a torn labrum and rotator cuff, he made his major league debut with Arizona on September 9, 2004. He got his first MLB in his second start, beating the St. Louis Cardinals on September 19. He went 1–1 with a 4.62 earned run average in six appearances (four starts) for the season. He split 2005 between the Diamondbacks and their Triple-A affiliate, the Tucson Sidewinders, going 0–3 with a 4.45 ERA in 13 appearances (five starts) for Arizona. Arizona designated Gosling for assignment on February 6, 2006.

=== Cincinnati Reds ===
On February 10, 2006, Gosling was selected off waivers by the Cincinnati Reds. He made one appearance with the Reds in 2006 and dealt with tendonitis in his throwing shoulder. He split 2007 between the Reds and the Triple-A Louisville Bats, going 2–0 with the Reds. He made 24 appearances over two seasons for the Reds, working exclusively as a reliever.

=== Toronto Blue Jays ===
In 2008, Gosling played in the Toronto Blue Jays organization and had a 3.67 ERA for the Triple-A Syracuse Chiefs. He led the International League with 58 pitching appearances and became a free agent at the end of the season.

=== Minnesota Twins ===
In January 2009, Gosling signed a minor league contract with the Minnesota Twins. After going 7–1 out of the bullpen for the Rochester Red Wings, he exercised a June 1 opt-out clause in his contract to become a free agent.

=== Cleveland Indians ===
On June 5, 2009, Gosling signed a minor league contract with the Cleveland Indians. He was then called up on June 19 and made 15 appearances for the Indians.

On December 2, 2009, Gosling re-signed with Cleveland on a minor league contract with an invite to spring training. On May 17, 2010, Gosling announced his retirement before a Columbus Clippers game for Cleveland's Triple-A minor league affiliate. He finished his career that night by pitching 6 1/3 scoreless innings in a start against the Durham Bulls.

== Personal life ==
In 2010, Gosling and his wife had a child and lived in the San Diego area. Gosling's sister swam in college for the California Golden Bears, and his brother played college baseball.

Growing up, two of Gosling's favorite players were Robin Yount and Paul Molitor of the Milwaukee Brewers. Yount was later the first base coach when Gosling was with the Diamondbacks while Molitor was a minor league instructor while Gosling was in the Twins system. He was also a fan of the Utah Jazz.

Gosling graduated from Stanford in 2002 with a degree in human biology. In August 2012, Gosling enrolled at Stanford Law School.
