= Bobby Livingston (baseball) =

American baseball player (born 1982)

- Pitcher
- Born: September 3, 1982 (age 43); St. Louis, Missouri, U.S.
- Batted: Left Threw: Left

MLB debut
- April 25, 2006, for the Seattle Mariners

Last MLB appearance
- August 21, 2007, for the Cincinnati Reds

MLB statistics
- Win–loss record: 3–3
- Earned run average: 6.31
- Strikeouts: 30
- Stats at Baseball Reference

Teams
- Seattle Mariners (2006); Cincinnati Reds (2007)

Robert James "Bobby" Livingston (born September 3, 1982) is a former professional baseball player who played in Major League Baseball (MLB) for the Seattle Mariners in 2006 and Cincinnati Reds in 2007.

== Amateur career ==
Livingston was originally enrolled at Estacado High School before transferring to Trinity Christian High School in Lubbock, Texas, for his final year of school. In 2001, he pitched for the Bethesda Big Train. He committed to play college baseball for the hometown Texas Tech Red Raiders before he was drafted.

== Professional career ==
=== Seattle Mariners ===
Livingston was selected by Seattle Mariners in the 4th round (129th overall) of 2001 Major League Baseball draft. He played in the minors for the Mariners through 2006, pitching for the Triple-A Tacoma Rainiers in parts of 2005 and 2006. In 2003, he was named the most valuable player of the Wisconsin Timber Rattlers and was a Midwest League All-Star. Baseball America said he had the best command among Mariners prospects.

Livingston made his major league debut for the Mariners on April 25, 2006, against the Chicago White Sox. He pitched 1 2/3 innings, allowing 5 hits, 4 runs, walking 3, and striking out 1. He appeared in 3 games as a reliever for Seattle in 2006, pitching five innings.

=== Cincinnati Reds ===
In December 2006, the Mariners put Livingston on waivers. He was claimed by the Tampa Bay Devil Rays, who quickly traded him to the Philadelphia Phillies. MLB intervened and declared the transaction to be null and void, as they judged that Tampa Bay had claimed Livingston for the sole purpose of trading him. He was then defaulted back to waivers and the Cincinnati Reds claimed him. He started 10 games for the Reds in 2007, with a 3–3 record and 5.27 ERA. His first MLB victory came on June 1 against the Colorado Rockies. On July 16, Livingston went 4-for-4 with an RBI tying the club record for most hits for a pitcher in a game. His season ended in early September due to a torn labrum in his shoulder.

He spent most of 2007 in Triple-A with the Louisville Bats and returned to the minor leagues in 2008.

=== Baltimore Orioles ===
Livingston became a free agent at the end of the 2008 season and signed a minor league contract in January 2009 with the Baltimore Orioles. He pitched in 13 games for the AA Bowie Baysox and 3 for the Triple-A Norfolk Tides. On July 3, he was released by Baltimore.

=== Cleveland Indians ===
Livingston then signed a minor league deal with the Cleveland Indians, where he pitched in nine games for the Double-A Akron Aeros and one for the Triple-A Columbus Clippers in the summer of 2009.

=== Pittsburgh Pirates ===
He was then sent to the Pittsburgh Pirates by the Cleveland Indians as part of a conditional deal on September 1, 2009. With the Pirates, he made one start for the Triple-A Indianapolis Indians.

=== New York Mets ===
On January 14, 2010, Livingston signed a minor league contract with the New York Mets. The Mets assigned him to the minor league Buffalo Bisons, where he appeared in 22 games and made 15 starts. He was 3–8 with a 5.34 ERA before he was released on July 29.

=== Los Angeles Dodgers ===
Livingston was promptly signed by the Los Angeles Dodgers and assigned to the Triple-A Albuquerque Isotopes. He appeared in three games with the Isotopes, with one start, before he was released on August 8.

=== Tampa Bay Rays ===
On August 16, 2010, Livingston signed a minor-league contract with the Tampa Bay Rays and was assigned to the Triple-A Durham Bulls. He pitched 5 games for the Bulls.

=== International and independent leagues ===
Livingston played for Vaqueros Laguna of the Mexican League in 2011. He played for the Brother Elephants of the Chinese Professional Baseball League in Taiwan in 2012 and the Sugar Land Skeeters in 2012 and 2013.
