= Brad Salmon =

American baseball player (born 1980)

- Relief pitcher
- Born: January 3, 1980 (age 46); Pensacola, Florida
- Batted: Left Threw: Right

MLB debut
- May 1, 2007, for the Cincinnati Reds

Last MLB appearance
- September 28, 2007, for the Cincinnati Reds

MLB statistics
- Win–loss record: 0–1
- Earned run average: 4.13
- Strikeouts: 22
- Stats at Baseball Reference

Teams
- Cincinnati Reds (2007)

Bradley Keith Salmon (born January 3, 1980) is an American former professional baseball pitcher.

== Career ==
He played in Minor League Baseball in 2006 with the Double-A Chattanooga Lookouts and Triple-A Louisville Bats. On March 19, 2008, the Cincinnati Reds traded Salmon to the Kansas City Royals for a player to be named later (Henry Arias).

He became a free agent at the end of the 2008 season and signed a minor league contract with the Chicago White Sox. He was released by the White Sox during spring training. On April 22, 2009, Salmon signed a minor league deal with the Los Angeles Angels of Anaheim. He spent the season with the Salt Lake Bees, the Angels' Triple-A affiliate.

After becoming a free agent after the 2009 season, Salmon signed with the Acereros de Monclova for 2010.
