= Lino Urdaneta =

Venezuelan baseball player (born 1979)

Dorados de Chihuahua
- Relief pitcher / Coach
- Born: November 20, 1979 (age 46); Caracas, Venezuela
- Batted: Right Threw: Right

MLB debut
- September 9, 2004, for the Detroit Tigers

Last MLB appearance
- May 7, 2007, for the New York Mets

MLB statistics
- Win–loss record: 0–0
- Earned run average: 63.00
- Strikeouts: 0
- Stats at Baseball Reference

Teams
- Detroit Tigers (2004); New York Mets (2007)

Lino Urdaneta (born November 20, 1979) is a Venezuelan former professional baseball relief pitcher who currently serves as a coach for the Dorados de Chihuahua of the Mexican League. He played in Major League Baseball (MLB) for the Detroit Tigers and the New York Mets.

== Playing career ==
After seven years in the Los Angeles Dodgers and Cleveland Indians minor league systems, Urdaneta was selected by the Detroit Tigers in the Rule 5 draft on December 15, 2003. Prior to joining the Tigers in 2004, he was sidelined due to inflammation in his right elbow.

Urdaneta made his Major League debut with the Tigers on September 9, 2004, allowing six earned runs without getting an out. Because of this, his career ERA was infinity.

On May 4, 2007, Urdaneta was brought up to the Major League roster by the New York Mets, replacing Chan Ho Park. He pitched in two games, lowering his career ERA to 63.00. Urdaneta was sent back down to the Triple-A New Orleans Zephyrs on May 15. The next day, MLB suspended Urdaneta 50 games for testing positive for a performance-enhancing substance.

In his minor league career, Urdaneta compiled a 15–26 win–loss record with 49 saves, 204 strikeouts, and a 4.72 earned run average (ERA) in 217 games. He made the Florida State League All-Star Team in 2002.

== Coaching career ==
On December 5, 2023, Urdaneta joined the Toros de Tijuana of the Mexican League as the team's bullpen coach.

On June 14, 2025, the Caliente de Durango hired Urdaneta as part of their coaching staff, replacing Martín Enríquez.

On January 9, 2026, Urdaneta was hired to serve as the pitching coach for the Dorados de Chihuahua.

== See also ==
- List of Major League Baseball players from Venezuela
