= Marcus McBeth =

American baseball player (born 1980)

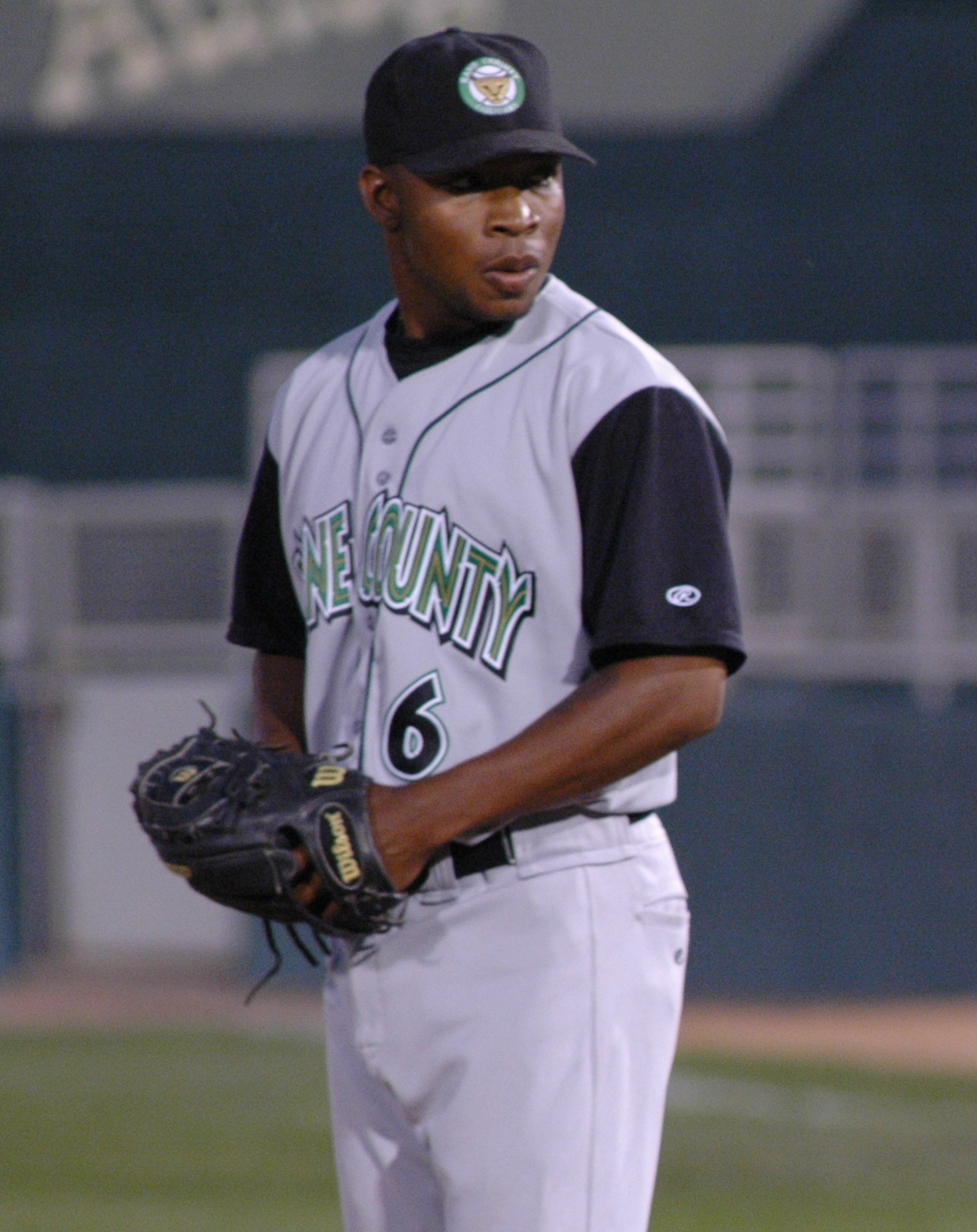
- McBeth with the Kane County Cougars in 2005
- Relief pitcher
- Born: August 23, 1980 (age 45); Spartanburg, South Carolina, U.S.
- Batted: Right Threw: Right

MLB debut
- June 6, 2007, for the Cincinnati Reds

Last MLB appearance
- September 28, 2007, for the Cincinnati Reds

MLB statistics
- Win–loss record: 3-2
- Earned run average: 5.95
- Strikeouts: 17
- Stats at Baseball Reference

Teams
- Cincinnati Reds (2007)

Marcus Andre McBeth (born August 23, 1980) is an American former Major League Baseball (MLB) right-handed relief pitcher who played for the Cincinnati Reds in 2007.

== Amateur career ==
A native of Spartanburg, South Carolina, McBeth attended Woodruff High School and the University of South Carolina, and in 2000 he played collegiate summer baseball with the Chatham A's of the Cape Cod Baseball League. He was selected in the fourth round of the June 2001 Major League Baseball draft by the Oakland Athletics as a center fielder.

== Professional career ==
McBeth did not produce much with the bat during his first three years of professional baseball; he batted just .233 (205 for 881) with 19 home runs and 111 runs batted in. He did, however, show a strong arm and was persuaded to give pitching a shot. Splitting 2005 between Kane County (Single-A), the Arizona A's (Rookie League) and Stockton (Single-A), McBeth posted a 2–2 record and an earned run average of 3.62 over 25 appearances (all relief) and 31.1 innings pitched.

McBeth started the 2006 season in Stockton as the team's closer. He was not scored upon in eight appearances, while also racking up seven saves. He was immediately promoted to Midland (Double-A), where he saved 25 games, posted an ERA of 2.48 and allowing opposing hitters to a paltry .213 batting average.

His success at the Double-A level prompted yet another promotion, to the Triple-A Sacramento River Cats. Success was harder to come by at the minors' highest level; in 7.1 innings, he surrendered nine runs and failed to register a single save. Still, McBeth's composite 2006 numbers were impressive: 3–3 record, 3.07 ERA, 32 saves and an opponents' batting average of .198 in 70 1/3 innings pitched.

In November 2006, McBeth was placed on the A's 40-man roster, preventing him from being chosen by another team via the Rule 5 Draft. In April 2007, McBeth was traded by the A's to the Cincinnati Reds, along with minor league pitcher Ben Jukich, for outfielder Chris Denorfia.

McBeth made his major league debut with the Reds on June 6, 2007, against the St. Louis Cardinals. Four days later, on June 10 he recorded his first win against AL rival Cleveland Indians.

On August 13, 2008, McBeth was claimed off waivers by the Boston Red Sox, and was optioned to their Triple-A team, the Pawtucket Red Sox.

On July 31, 2009, McBeth was called up to join the Red Sox bullpen following the trade of Justin Masterson. He was optioned the following day without making an appearance. In October 2009, McBeth was granted free agency.

In 2010, he returned to the Athletics, and appeared in 14 games for the River Cats. He was granted free agency after the 2010 season.

McBeth featured a fastball that in 2005 was clocked as high as 93 miles per hour. He also features a slider and a changeup. His changeup has improved with the assistance of A's pitching coordinator (and former big-league hurler) Ron Romanick.

== Personal life ==
As of 2025, McBeth lives in Queen Creek, Arizona, and is the founder of a recruiting agency for high school athletes, called Pordl.

== Bibliography ==
2006 Oakland Athletics Media Guide. Pg. 387. Produced by the Oakland Athletics Public Relations Department.
