= Matt Belisle =

American baseball player (born 1980)

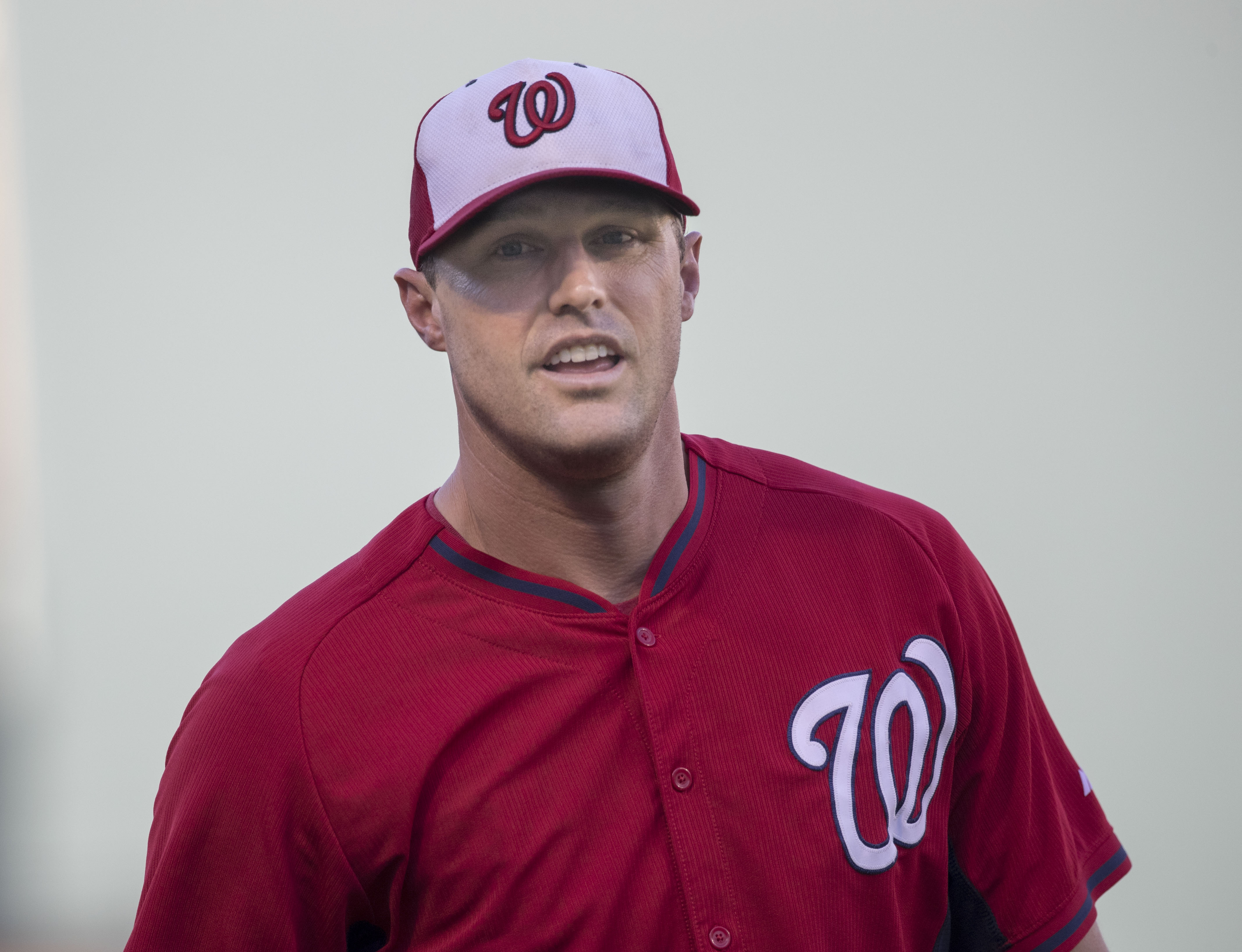
- Belisle with the Washington Nationals in 2016
- Pitcher
- Born: June 6, 1980 (age 46); Austin, Texas, U.S.
- Batted: Right Threw: Right

MLB debut
- September 7, 2003, for the Cincinnati Reds

Last MLB appearance
- September 30, 2018, for the Minnesota Twins

MLB statistics
- Win–loss record: 52–58
- Earned run average: 4.32
- Strikeouts: 711
- Stats at Baseball Reference

Teams
- Cincinnati Reds (2003, 2005–2008); Colorado Rockies (2009–2014); St. Louis Cardinals (2015); Washington Nationals (2016); Minnesota Twins (2017); Cleveland Indians (2018); Minnesota Twins (2018)

Matthew Thomas Belisle (beh-LYLE; born June 6, 1980) is an American former professional baseball pitcher. He played in Major League Baseball (MLB) for the Cincinnati Reds, Colorado Rockies, St. Louis Cardinals, Washington Nationals, Minnesota Twins, and Cleveland Indians. Belisle was drafted by the Atlanta Braves in the second round of the 1998 Major League Baseball draft.

== Early life ==
He was born in Austin, Texas, and attended St. Andrew's Episcopal School through middle school. He attended McCallum High School and was drafted out of high school by the Atlanta Braves in the second round of the 1998 Major League Baseball draft.

== Career ==
=== Minor leagues ===
Belisle began his professional career in 1999, pitching for the Rookie-level Danville Braves. He was promoted to the Single-A Macon Braves to begin the 2000 season; in 15 starts, he had a 2.38 ERA and a WHIP under 1. This was good enough to get Belisle a promotion to Single-A Advanced Myrtle Beach where he had a 3.43 ERA in 12 starts. He spent all of 2002 and most of 2003 with the Double-A Greenville Braves before being traded to the Cincinnati Reds for veteran relief pitcher Kent Mercker as the PTBNL on August 14, 2003.

=== Cincinnati Reds ===
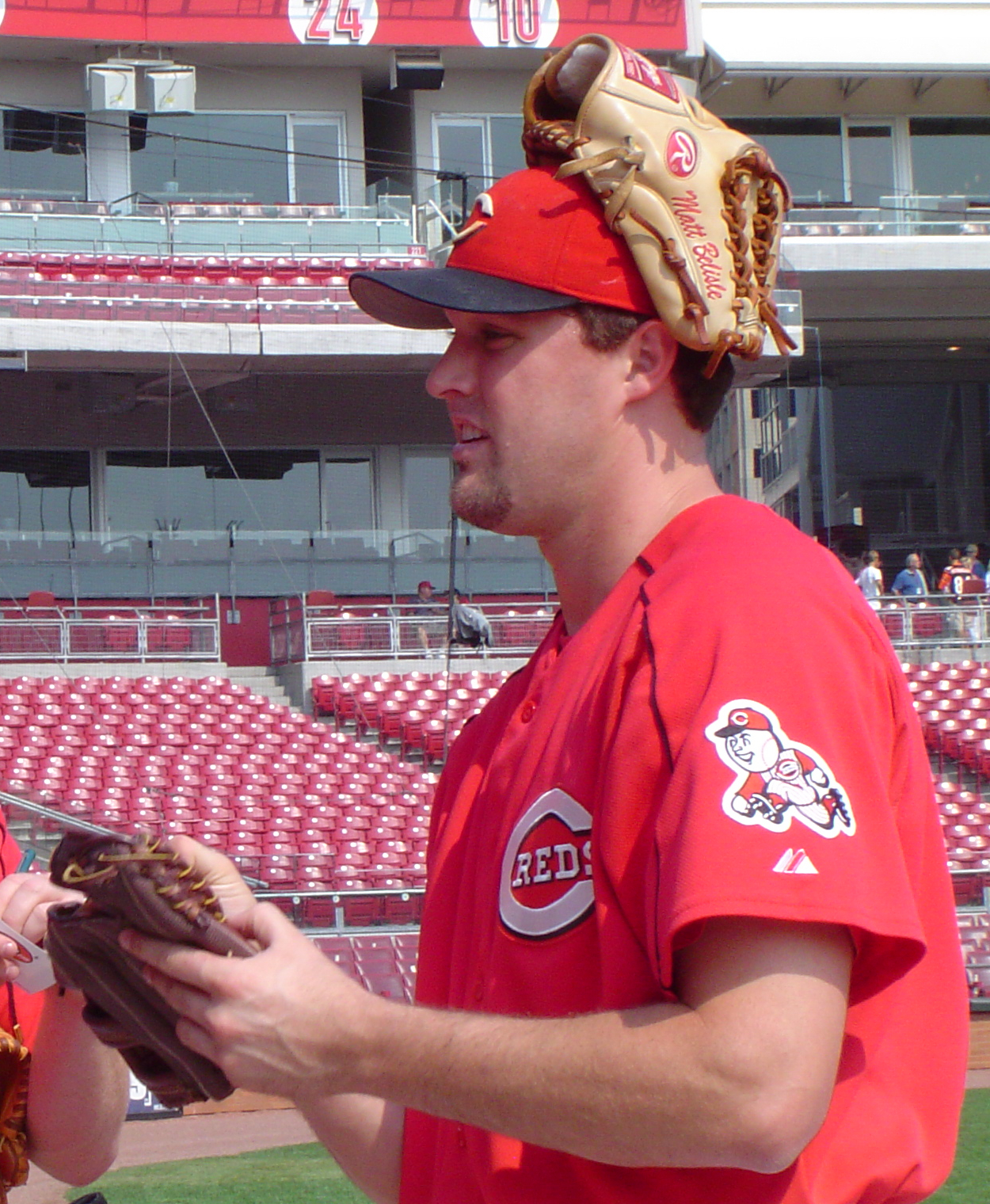
Belisle with the Cincinnati Reds in 2006

Belisle was assigned to Triple-A Louisville and was called up to the majors on September 7, 2003, making his debut that same day. In his debut, he pitched 2 innings, giving up a solo home run and walking one. In 6 relief appearances, he had a 1–1 record and a 5.20 ERA. Belisle did not play in the majors in 2004. He spent the entire year in Triple-A and struggled with a 9–11 record and a 5.26 ERA in 28 starts.

In 2005, Belisle spent the entire year in the majors, mostly pitching out of the bullpen. He made 5 starts and 55 relief appearances with an ERA of 4.41. He went 2–0 with a 3.60 ERA in 40 innings in 2006, but missed a big chunk of the season with a back injury. In 2007, in a career-high 30 starts for the Reds, Belisle went 8–9 with a 5.32 ERA after winning the number five spot in the starting rotation, after being mostly a reliever the past two years. In 2008, he struggled in 6 starts with a 1–4 record and 7.28 ERA before being sent down to Triple-A and being reconverted into a relief pitcher.

=== Colorado Rockies ===
On January 14, 2009, Belisle signed a minor league contract with the Colorado Rockies. He had his contract selected to the major league roster on April 10. He was designated for assignment on May 25, he cleared waivers and was sent outright to Triple-A Colorado Springs Sky Sox the next day. He had his contract selected to the major league roster a second time on July 11. He was designated for assignment a second time on July 16, he again cleared waivers and was sent outright to Triple-A on July 21. He had his contract selected to the majors for a third time on September 8.

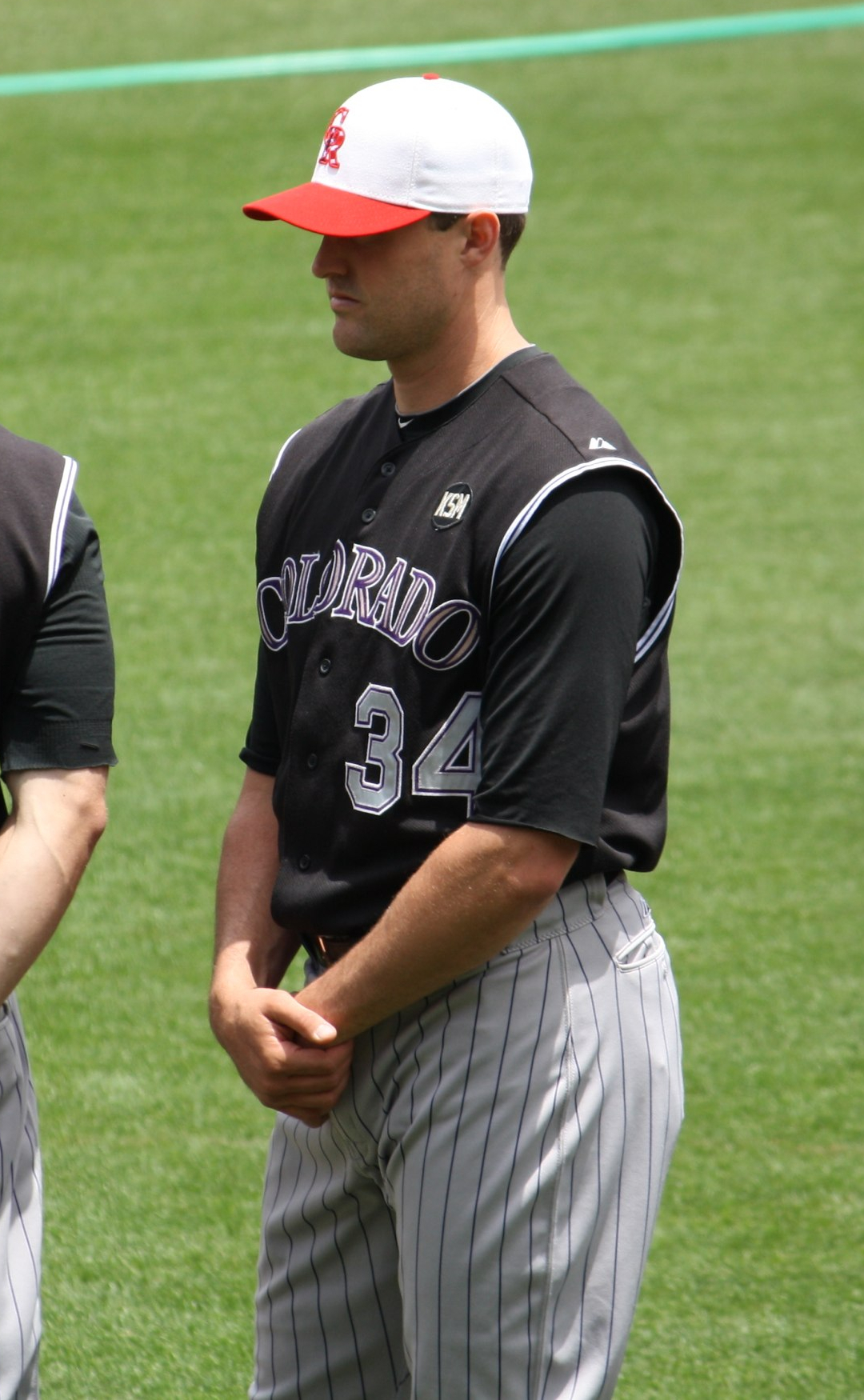
Belisle during his tenure with the Colorado Rockies in 2010

Belisle enjoyed the best season of his career with the Rockies in 2010, mostly as a setup pitcher, posting a 7–5 record, 2.93 ERA, 91 K in 92 innings of work. He led all big league relievers with his 92 innings pitched.

In January 2011, he avoided salary arbitration with Colorado by signing a 1-year deal worth $2.35 million. The Rockies signed Belisle to a new two-year deal worth $6.125 million a month later that overwrote his prior deal, and also got him under contract an extra year before hitting free agency. In addition, it included an incentive in which he would earn an additional $225,000 in bonuses based on games finished. He proceeded to compile a 10–4 record with a 3.25 ERA and 58 Ks in 72 IP.

Before the 2012 season, he agreed to a two-year extension (which added a $4.1 million salary for 2013 and included a mutual option for 2014) at a minimum of $4.35 million. He went on to pitch to a 3.71 earned run average with a 3–9 record as well as 69 strikeouts in 80 innings.

The 33-year-old Belisle came into 2013 being considered one of the Rockies' more reliable relievers. He compiled a record of 5–7 with a 4.32 ERA in 72 games. He became a free agent following the 2014 season.

=== St.Louis Cardinals ===
Matt Belisle's pitching motion.

On December 2, 2014, Belisle signed a one-year deal with the St. Louis Cardinals. After throwing a perfect inning against the Miami Marlins, he experienced pain in his arm. The Cardinals attempted to give him rest to alleviate the pain, but were unsuccessful, placing him on the disabled list on June 30. Through that point, Belisle had a 3.00 ERA in 30 games. The club activated him from the DL on September 12.

During a game against the Chicago Cubs on September 18, Belisle helped further the more-than-century old Cardinals–Cubs rivalry. Cubs pitcher Dan Haren hit teammate Matt Holliday in the back of the helmet. Two innings later, Belisle grazed first baseman Anthony Rizzo behind the knee in the seventh inning, prompting his ejection. The Cubs won, 8–3. Remarked Cubs manager Joe Maddon about Belisle hitting Rizzo, "I have no history with the Cardinals except I used to love them growing up. That really showed me a lot today in a negative way. I don't know who put out the hit. I don't know if Tony Soprano is in the dugout. I didn't see him in there. But we're not going to put up with it, from them or anybody else."

=== Washington Nationals ===
On February 17, 2016, Belisle, signed a minor league deal with the Washington Nationals. The Nationals selected his contract and added him to their 40-man roster on March 29. Belisle led the team with a 1.76 ERA over 46 innings out of the bullpen, but he was left off the Nationals' roster for the 2016 National League Division Series against the Los Angeles Dodgers. He became a free agent following the season.

=== Minnesota Twins ===
On February 3, 2017, Belisle signed a one-year contract with the Minnesota Twins. Belisle began the season as the setup man for the Twins but after August, he was put as closer for the team for the remainder of the season. He finished the season with a 2–2 record in 62 games and a career high 9 saves.

=== Cleveland Indians ===
On February 25, 2018, the Cleveland Indians signed Belisle to a minor league contract, and purchased his contract on March 29, 2018.

Belisle was designated for assignment by the Indians on May 2, 2018. He elected free agency on May 8 after clearing waivers. Belisle re-signed with the Indians organization on a minor-league contract on May 16, 2018. The Indians released Belisle on June 11, 2018.

=== Minnesota Twins (second stint) ===
Belisle rejoined the Twins after signing a Major League contract with the team on June 11, 2018. In his second stint with the Twins, Belisle did not have a good outing, finishing the season with a 9.13 ERA in 25 appearances. On the final day of the season, Joe Mauer requested Belisle to be the pitcher on the mound when he appeared for one final pitch as a catcher before retiring after the game.
