= Ronnie Ortegon =

- First baseman / Coach
- Born: March 31, 1966 (age 59)
- Bats: Left Throws: Left
- Stats at Baseball Reference

Ronnie Lee Ortegon (born March 31, 1966) is a professional baseball player, coach, and manager.

== Career ==
Ortegon starred at Plainview High School in Plainview, Texas, before playing minor league baseball in the California Angels organization. He is a former head baseball coach for Forney High School. He coached in the Philadelphia Phillies minor league system for 3 years as the manager for the Batavia Muckdogs (2002), and hitting coach for the Reading Phillies (2003) and the Gulf Coast League Phillies (2004). The Cincinnati Reds hired Ortegon as their assistant hitting coach after the 2012 season. After the 2013 season, Ortegon joined the Atlanta Braves as their minor league hitting instructor.

On January 19, 2017, Ortegon was announced as the hitting coach for the New Hampshire Fisher Cats, Double-A affiliate of the Toronto Blue Jays.
