= Tom Shearn =

American baseball player (born 1977)

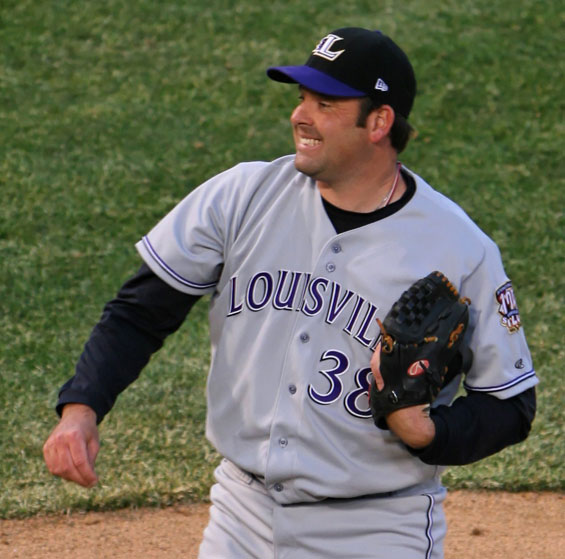
- Pitcher
- Born: August 28, 1977 (age 48); Columbus, Ohio, U.S.
- Batted: Right Threw: Right

MLB debut
- August 26, 2007, for the Cincinnati Reds

Last MLB appearance
- September 26, 2007, for the Cincinnati Reds

MLB statistics
- Win–loss record: 3-0
- Earned run average: 4.96
- Strikeouts: 16
- Stats at Baseball Reference

Teams
- Cincinnati Reds (2007); Samsung Lions (2008)

Tom Shearn
Medal record

Men's baseball

Representing United States

Baseball World Cup
Silver medal – second place	2001 Taipei	National team

Thomas Aaron Shearn (born August 28, 1977) is an American former Major League Baseball pitcher. Shearn, who spent 11 years in the minor leagues, made his big league debut for the Cincinnati Reds on August 26, 2007, in a game in which he started for the Reds against the Florida Marlins. Before being called up, Shearn was living out of the groundskeeper's trailer at the stadium of the Reds' Louisville affiliate. Shearn had driven in his trailer from Louisville, Kentucky, to get to the game, as he was supposed to start that day for the Reds' AAA affiliate, the Louisville Bats. He made two more starts for the Reds in September, the best one coming in a 7–0 win over the Mets on September 5, 2007. In that game he threw six scoreless innings, striking out three and surrendering three hits. Shearn is famously quoted as saying, "Tom Shearn is only one man".

On May 30, 2008, the Reds sold his contract to the Samsung Lions of the KBO League. Shearn was signed by the Minnesota Twins to a minor league contract on July 28 and he played for the Rochester Red Wings, the Twins' Triple-A affiliate, for the rest of the year.
