= 2008 Florida Marlins season =

2008 Florida Marlins
- League: National League
- Division: East
- Ballpark: Dolphin Stadium
- City: Miami Gardens, Florida
- Record: 84–77 (.522)
- Divisional place: 3rd
- Owners: Jeffrey Loria
- President of baseball operations: Larry Beinfest
- General managers: Michael Hill
- Managers: Fredi González
- Television: FSN Florida; Sun Sports; Rich Waltz, Tommy Hutton
- Radio: WAXY (English); Dave Van Horne, Glenn Geffner; WQBA (Spanish)

The 2008 Florida Marlins season was the 16th season for the Major League Baseball franchise. Fredi González returned for his second season as manager. Despite having the lowest payroll in the Major Leagues, the Marlins finished with a record of 84–77, the fourth best record in franchise history, however, they failed to make the playoffs for the fifth consecutive season.

== Offseason ==
- February 15, 2008: Signed outfielder Marcell Ozuna as a non-drafted free agent.

== Regular season ==
=== April ===
The season started off well for the Marlins even though they lost the opening series to the New York Mets. They go on to beat the Pittsburgh Pirates, sweep the Washington Nationals in their series, and take the first game of the series vs. Houston Astros while earning their 4th straight victory and leading their division with a 7–3 record by 1 1/2 games the first week. They tied the franchise record for the most victories in April, with 15.

=== May ===
The Marlins started the month with a loss to the Dodgers, but after taking two of three from the Padres they swept the Brewers and the Nationals back-to-back to eventually improve to a Major League best record on May 11, before the Reds took three in a row in Cincinnati. After a rainout the Royals handed the Marlins their fourth consecutive loss, the last two of the interleague series were split. They went on to sweep the Arizona Diamondbacks, whom at that time had the National League's best record, and in that process stopped Brandon Webb from starting the season with a 10–0 record, a feat not accomplished since World War I. After winning the homes series against the Giants and losing to the Mets at Shea Stadium the Marlins split the first two of three in Philadelphia to finish May atop their division with a half-game edge over the Phillies. They were in first place or tied for first all through the month except for May 30.

=== June ===
After a loss in Philadelphia, the Marlins fell back to second place in the division, but they could hold the second spot despite losing three of four in Atlanta. Back in Dolphin Stadium, they split a four-game series against the Reds. In the last game of the series on June 9, Ken Griffey Jr. hit his 600th career home run off Mark Hendrickson in a 9–4 loss. The Marlins finished their home stand winning two of three against the Phillies, and narrowed the gap to their division rival to three games. An interleague road swing starting in St. Petersburg saw both teams of the Citrus Series sporting records above .500 for the first time ever. Tampa Bay took the first two games, but an outstanding performance by Ricky Nolasco earned him the win and a shared NL Player of the Week award, and let the series finish on a high note for the Fish. For the first time in Seattle at Safeco Field, they took two of three on solid outings by youngsters Andrew Miller and Ryan Tucker, before heading after a day off to another new ballpark for a three-game series against the Oakland Athletics. Despite a Marlins' long ball attack with four home runs in the first encounter, the A's won it in extra innings to take two of three. After a day off the Marlins were swept in three games by their state rival Tampa Bay Rays to finish 2008 interleague play with a 5–10 record. The first loss to the D-Backs in 2008 was the only blemish in the last four games in June. Throughout the month in second place they trailed the Phillies only half a game in the division standings on June 30.

=== July ===
The Marlins stayed in the top three of the NL East division throughout the month. They won or split all but two — against the Rockies and the Braves — of their series in July. Though they never held first place, they neither were back more than three games and finished the month seven games over .500, trailing the first place Phillies only by 1 1/2 games. Remarkable was a game at Coors Field on July 4, where the Marlins were vanquished after blowing a nine run lead to finally lose 18–17. Ironically, the Marlins led the NL with 32 come-from-behind wins as of the end of the month. The rotation was shaken up with the call-up of Chris Volstad on July 6. He earned his first win that same night in two innings of relief at Colorado, then earning his first win as a starter five days later at the Dodgers with a brilliant 8 2/3-inning performance, helping the Marlins take three of four in L.A. Right before the All-Star break, Josh Johnson made it back to the line-up, only eleven months after having undergone Tommy John surgery. On July 31, Aníbal Sánchez also had his comeback after shoulder surgery. Both of them boosted the rotation like the acquisition of top pitchers. Before the July 31 trade deadline, there were major rumors of the Fish acquiring Manny Ramírez for the rest of the season, but he eventually was traded to the Dodgers. The multiple rumors did not impact the squad, having beaten both the Cubs at Wrigley and their division rivals Mets at home twice, before taking the first game of a four-game series against the Rockies at Dolphin Stadium.

Hanley Ramírez started at shortstop for the National League in the All-Star Game, recording two hits and a run. Dan Uggla also participated in the Home Run Derby and the All-Star Game, where he recorded three errors and three strikeouts in 15 innings.

=== August ===
August became a rough month for the Marlins, and for the first time in the season, the team significantly lost ground in the divisional race to the Mets and the Phillies. While the Fish started the month only one and a half games back, they fell to seven games behind the then first place New York Mets on August 31. The offense struggled, as did the bullpen. The solid rotation with Josh Johnson, Chris Volstad and an outstanding Ricky Nolasco was not enough to carry the team with a lack of production at the plate. After blowing a few late leads, closer Kevin Gregg was limited in his appearances while allowing his tender knee to heal. Matt Lindstrom took over as closer. The only series wins came on the road at the Phillies and the Diamondbacks, but without any back-to-back wins in the entirety of August, the Marlins could not keep pace with the division leading teams. Highlights in August were the first complete games since September 16, 2006, thrown by Ricky Nolasco on August 19 against the Giants, and followed up by Johnson's complete game on August 27 against the Braves. Nolasco's complete game ended an MLB record set by the Marlins for most games between complete games.

=== September ===
The hopes of climbing back to first place in the National League East were low, but the Marlins kept battling in the month of September. In the process, they accomplished an MLB-first feat. With Jorge Cantú's 25th home run of the season, the Marlins' infielders became the first starting infielder foursome in MLB history to each hit 25 or more home runs. Additionally, Hanley Ramírez's decisive home run on September 13 made him the second Marlin ever to join the 30–30 club. During the month, the Marlins tied a franchise record of nine straight wins. This put them at 4 games back in the East division and 3.5 games back in the NL Wild Card race. That late surge wasn't enough though, as the Marlins lost the next four games. In the final season series, the Marlins played spoiler, ruining the Mets playoff chances by winning two of three in New York. The Marlins ended the season with an 84–77 record. This was their best non-playoff season record in franchise history, and third best season record overall.

=== Season standings ===
NL East
Team	W	L	Pct.	GB	Home	Road
Philadelphia Phillies	92	70	.568	—	48‍–‍33	44‍–‍37
New York Mets	89	73	.549	3	48‍–‍33	41‍–‍40
Florida Marlins	84	77	.522	7½	45‍–‍36	39‍–‍41
Atlanta Braves	72	90	.444	20	43‍–‍38	29‍–‍52
Washington Nationals	59	102	.366	32½	34‍–‍46	25‍–‍56

=== Record vs. opponents ===
2008 National League record Source: MLB Standings Grid – 2008
Team	AZ	ATL	CHC	CIN	COL	FLA	HOU	LAD	MIL	NYM	PHI	PIT	SD	SF	STL	WAS	AL
Arizona	–	3–5	2–4	2–4	15–3	2–7	4–2	8–10	2–5	3–3	3–4	4–3	10–8	11–7	3–4	4–2	6–9
Atlanta	5–3	–	0–6	3–3	4–3	10–8	3–3	4–2	3–6	11–7	4–14	2–5	5–1	2–5	2–5	6–12	8–7
Chicago	4–2	6–0	–	8–7	5–1	4–3	8–9	5–2	9–7	4–2	3–4	14–4	5–2	4–3	9–6	3–3	6–9
Cincinnati	4–2	3–3	7–8	–	1–5	6–2	3–12	1–7	10–8	3–4	3–5	6–9	4–3	5–1	5–10	4–3	9–6
Colorado	3–15	3–4	1–5	5–1	–	5–3	3–3	8–10	4–3	3–6	0–5	5–2	9–9	11–7	3–4	4–3	7–8
Florida	7–2	8–10	3–4	2–6	3–5	–	4–2	3–4	5–1	8–10	10–8	3–2	4–2	3–3	2–5	14–3	5–10
Houston	2–4	3–3	9–8	12–3	3–3	2–4	–	4–3	7–8	5–2	3–4	8–8	3–3	7–1	7–8	4–2	7–11
Los Angeles	10–8	2–4	2–5	7–1	10–8	4–3	3–4	–	4–2	3–4	4–4	5–2	11–7	9–9	2–4	3–3	5–10
Milwaukee	5–2	6–3	7–9	8–10	3–4	1–5	8–7	2–4	–	2–4	1–5	14–1	4–3	6–0	10–5	6–2	7–8
New York	3–3	7–11	2–4	4–3	6–3	10–8	2–5	4–3	4–2	–	11–7	4–3	2–5	5–1	4–3	12–6	9–6
Philadelphia	4–3	14–4	4–3	5–3	5–0	8–10	4–3	4–4	5–1	7–11	–	4–2	4–2	3–3	5–4	12–6	4–11
Pittsburgh	3–4	5–2	4–14	9–6	2–5	2–3	8–8	2–5	1–14	3–4	2–4	–	3–4	4–2	10–7	3–4	6–9
San Diego	8–10	1–5	2–5	3–4	9–9	2–4	3–3	7–11	3–4	5–2	2–4	4–3	–	5–13	1–6	5–1	3–15
San Francisco	7–11	5–2	3–4	1–5	7–11	3–3	1–7	9–9	0–6	1–5	3–3	2–4	13–5	–	4–3	7–0	6–12
St. Louis	4–3	5–2	6–9	10–5	4–3	5–2	8–7	4–2	5–10	3–4	4–5	7–10	6–1	3–4	–	5–1	7–8
Washington	2–4	12–6	3–3	3–4	3–4	3–14	2–4	3–3	2–6	6–12	6–12	4–3	1–5	0–7	1–5	–	8–10

=== Roster ===
2008 Florida Marlins
Roster
Pitchers: 66 Burke Badenhop; 45 Eulogio de la Cruz; 61 Jesus Delgado; 48 Lee Gardner; 63 Kevin Gregg; 30 Mark Hendrickson; 55 Josh Johnson; 19 Logan Kensing; 22 Matt Lindstrom; 23 Andrew Miller; 32 Justin Miller; 46 Joe Nelson; 47 Ricky Nolasco; 34 Scott Olsen; 37 Renyel Pinto; 53 Arthur Rhodes; 36 Aníbal Sánchez; 57 Taylor Tankersley; 39 Ryan Tucker; 56 Rick van den Hurk; 41 Chris Volstad; 35 Doug Waechter	Catchers: 53, 21 John Baker; 13 Paul Hoover; 16 Paul Lo Duca; 58 Mike Rabelo; 20 Matt Treanor; Infielders: 11 Robert Andino; 3 Jorge Cantú; 39,18 Wes Helms; 17 Mike Jacobs; 8 Dallas McPherson; 2 Hanley Ramírez; 29 Gaby Sánchez; 6 Dan Uggla	Outfielders: 4 Alfredo Amézaga; 25 Brett Carroll; 26 Luis Gonzalez; 27 Jeremy Hermida; 29 Jacque Jones; 24 Cameron Maybin; 65 Jai Miller; 12 Cody Ross; 14 Josh Willingham; Other batters: 28 Jason Wood	Manager: 33 Fredi González; Coaches: 67 Pierre Arsenault (bullpen coordinator); 54 Steve Foster (bullpen); 9 Andy Fox (first base/infield); 16, 31 Bo Porter (third base); 40 Jim Presley (hitting); 10 Carlos Tosca (bench); 28 Mark Wiley (pitching)

=== Game log ===
Legend
Marlins win	Marlins loss	Game postponed

2008 Florida Marlins game log
March: 0-1

#	Date	Opponent	Score	Win	Loss	Save	Attendance	Record
1	March 31	Mets	7–2	Santana (1–0)	Hendrickson (0–1)		38,308	0–1

April: 15-11

#	Date	Opponent	Score	Win	Loss	Save	Attendance	Record
2	April 1	Mets	5–4	J. Miller (1–0)	Wise (0–1)		15,117	1–1
3	April 2	Mets	13–0	Pérez (1–0)	A. Miller (0–1)		13,720	1–2
4	April 4	Pirates	5–4	Gregg (1–0)	Osoria (1–1)		10,089	2–2
5	April 5	Pirates	7–3	Hendrickson (1–1)	Maholm (0–1)		15,752	3–2
6	April 6	Pirates	9–2	Snell (1–0)	VandenHurk (0–1)		10,431	3–3
7	April 7	@ Nationals	10–7	Pinto (1–0)	Redding (1–1)	Gregg (1)	20,487	4–3
8	April 9	@ Nationals	10–4	Olsen (1–0)	Bergmann (0–1)		23,340	5–3
9	April 10	@ Nationals	4–3	Hendrickson (2–1)	Pérez (0–2)	Gregg (2)	24,549	6–3
10	April 11	@ Astros	10–6	Nolasco (1–0)	Oswalt (0–3)		34,191	7–3
11	April 12	@ Astros	5–0	Backe (1–1)	Badenhop (0–1)		34,336	7–4
12	April 13	@ Astros	5–1	Rodríguez (2–0)	A. Miller (0–2)		29,766	7–5
13	April 15	Braves	4–0	Olsen (2–0)	Jurrjens (1–2)		10,462	8–5
14	April 16	Braves	6–5	Hendrickson (3–1)	Hudson (2–1)	Gregg (3)	10,712	9–5
15	April 17	Braves	8–0	Smoltz (3–0)	Nolasco (1–1)		11,237	9–6
16	April 18	Nationals	6–4	Redding (3–1)	J. Miller (1–1)	Rauch (3)	13,279	9–7
17	April 19	Nationals	6–5	Gregg (2–0)	Rivera (1–1)		18,944	10–7
18	April 20	Nationals	6–1	Olsen (3–0)	Ayala (0–1)		11,635	11–7
19	April 21	@ Pirates	10–4	Hendrickson (4–1)	Morris (0–3)		8,444	12–7
20	April 22	@ Pirates	3–2	Maholm (1–2)	Nolasco (1–2)	Capps (5)	10,185	12–8
21	April 23	@ Braves	7–2	A. Miller (1–2)	Bennett (0–1)		19,852	13–8
22	April 24	@ Braves	7–4	James (2–1)	Badenhop (0–2)	Acosta (2)	19,903	13–9
23	April 25	@ Brewers	3–0	Gregg (3–0)	Mota (1–1)		40,088	14–9
24	April 26	@ Brewers	4–3	Torres (3–0)	Pinto (1–1)	Gagné (7)	44,169	14–10
25	April 27	@ Brewers	3–2	Lindstrom (1–0)	McClung (1–1)	Gregg (4)	41,656	15–10
26	April 29	Dodgers	7–6	Beimel (2–0)	Gregg (3–1)	Saito (3)	11,334	15–11
27	April 30	Dodgers	13–1	Billingsley (1–4)	Olsen (3–1)		10,792	15–12

May: 16-11

#	Date	Opponent	Score	Win	Loss	Save	Attendance	Record
28	May 1	Dodgers	5–3	Beimel (3–0)	Gregg (3–2)	Saito (4)	15,556	15–13
29	May 2	Padres	6–4	Hendrickson (5–1)	Germano (0–3)	Gregg (5)	14,562	16–13
30	May 3	Padres	7–2	Peavy (4–1)	Nolasco (1–3)		37,689	16–14
31	May 4	Padres	10–3	A. Miller (2–2)	Maddux (2–3)		11,422	17–14
32	May 6	Brewers	3–0	Olsen (3–0)	Suppan (1–2)	Gregg (6)	10,113	18–14
33	May 7	Brewers	6–2	Badenhop (1–2)	Bush (0–4)		10,405	19–14
34	May 8	Brewers	7–2	Kensing (1–0)	Villanueva (1–4)		12,321	20–14
35	May 9	@ Nationals	7–3	Nolasco (2–3)	Redding (4–3)		23,379	21–14
36	May 10	@ Nationals	11–0	A. Miller (3–2)	O'Connor (1–1)		28,663	22–14
37	May 11	@ Nationals	5–4	Kensing (2–0)	Ayala (1–3)	Gregg (7)	25,871	23–14
38	May 12	@ Reds	8–7	Harang (2–5)	Tankersley (0–1)	Cordero (6)	15,233	23–15
39	May 13	@ Reds	5–3	Vólquez (6–1)	Hendrickson (5–2)	Cordero (7)	14,015	23–16
40	May 14	@ Reds	7–6	Burton (2–1)	Pinto (1–2)		12,756	23–17
–	May 15	@ Reds	Postponed (rain) Rescheduled September 22					
41	May 16	Royals	7–6	Tomko (2–4)	A. Miller (3–3)	Soria (11)	14,825	23–18
42	May 17	Royals	7–3	Kensing (3–0)	Bannister (4–5)		16,214	24–18
43	May 18	Royals	9–3	Greinke (5–1)	Badenhop (1–3)		10,617	24–19
44	May 20	Diamondbacks	3–2	Hendrickson (6–2)	Owings (5–2)	Gregg (8)	10,696	25–19
45	May 21	Diamondbacks	3–1	Nolasco (3–3)	Webb (9–1)	Gregg (9)	11,227	26–19
46	May 22	Diamondbacks	4–0	A. Miller (4–3)	Haren (5–3)		13,233	27–19
47	May 23	Giants	8–2	Zito (1–8)	Olsen (4–2)		15,003	27–20
–	May 24	Giants	Postponed (rain) Rescheduled May 25, (doubleheader)					
48	May 25	Giants	8–6	Hendrickson (7–2)	Misch (0–1)	Gregg (10)	14,674	28–20
49	May 25	Giants	5–4	Gregg (4–2)	Walker (2–3)		14,674	29–20
50	May 26	@ Mets	7–3	Nolasco (4–3)	Pelfrey (2–6)		51,489	30–20
51	May 27	@ Mets	5–3	Santana (6–3)	A. Miller (4–4)		47,093	30–21
52	May 28	@ Mets	7–6	Sánchez (1–0)	J. Miller (1–2)		47,769	30–22
53	May 30	@ Phillies	12–3	Myers (3–6)	Hendrickson (7–3)		45,118	30–23
54	May 31	@ Phillies	7–3	Nolasco (5–3)	Hamels (5–4)		45,261	31–23

June: 12-16

#	Date	Opponent	Score	Win	Loss	Save	Attendance	Record
55	June 1	@ Phillies	7–5	Moyer (6–3)	Waechter (0–1)	Lidge (13)	45,312	31–24
56	June 2	@ Braves	7 – 5 (10)	Ohman (2–0)	Kensing (3–1)		20,896	31–25
57	June 3	@ Braves	5–4	Ohman (3–0)	Lindstrom (1–0)	Soriano (2)	25,476	31–26
58	June 4	@ Braves	6–4	J. Miller (2–2)	Acosta (3–3)	Gregg (11)	26,917	32–26
59	June 5	@ Braves	7–5	Jurrjens (6–3)	Nolasco (5–4)	Soriano (3)	27,238	32–27
60	June 6	Reds	11–3	Cueto (5–5)	A. Miller (4–5)		16,084	32–28
61	June 7	Reds	8–7	Badenhop (2–3)	Cordero (2–1)		25,289	33–28
62	June 8	Reds	9–2	Tucker (1–0)	Harang (2–9)		12,444	34–28
63	June 9	Reds	9–4	Vólquez (9–2)	Hendrickson (7–4)		16,003	34–29
64	June 10	Phillies	5–4	Nolasco (6–4)	Myers (3–8)	Gregg (12)	12,411	35–29
65	June 11	Phillies	6–2	Gregg (5–2)	Gordon (5–3)		14,122	36–29
66	June 12	Phillies	3–0	Moyer (7–3)	Olsen (4–3)	Lidge (18)	15,202	36–30
67	June 13	@ Rays	7–3	Sonnanstine (7–3)	Tucker (1–1)		19,312	36–31
68	June 14	@ Rays	4–1	Garza (5–3)	Hendrickson (7–4)	Percival (15)	31,195	36–32
69	June 15	@ Rays	9–3	Nolasco (7–4)	Jackson (4–6)		28,886	37–32
70	June 16	@ Mariners	6–1	A. Miller (5–5)	Silva (3–8)		21,609	38–32
71	June 17	@ Mariners	5–4	Hernández (6–5)	Olsen (4–4)	Morrow (2)	20,214	38–33
72	June 18	@ Mariners	8–3	Tucker (2–1)	Dickey (1–3)		24,163	39–33
73	June 20	@ Athletics	7–6	Brown (1–0)	Waechter (0–2)		15,035	39–34
74	June 21	@ Athletics	6–4	Pinto (2–2)	Street (1–2)	Gregg (13)	19,287	40–34
75	June 22	@ Athletics	7–1	Duchscherer (8–4)	A. Miller (5–6)		22,461	40–35
76	June 24	Rays	6–4	Howell (6–0)	Pinto (2–3)	Percival (18)	12,352	40–36
77	June 25	Rays	15–3	Shields (5–5)	Tucker (2–2)		13,165	40–37
78	June 26	Rays	6–1	Garza (6–4)	Hendrickson (7–6)		17,107	40–38
79	June 27	Diamondbacks	3–1	Nolasco (8–4)	Owings (6–7)	Gregg (14)	15,291	41–38
80	June 28	Diamondbacks	6–2	Webb (12–4)	A. Miller (5–7)		27,777	41–39
81	June 29	Diamondbacks	4–3	Nelson (1–0)	Lyon (2–2)		11,327	42–39
82	June 30	Nationals	6–5	Gregg (6–2)	Rauch (4–2)		10,888	43–39

July: 15-12

#	Date	Opponent	Score	Win	Loss	Save	Attendance	Record
83	July 1	Nationals	9–6	Balester (1–0)	Hendrickson (7–7)		12,166	43–40
84	July 2	Nationals	4–2	Nolasco (9–4)	Manning (0–2)		23,624	44–40
85	July 3	@ Rockies	6 – 5 (11)	Herges (3–3)	Gregg (6–3)		48,084	44–41
86	July 4	@ Rockies	18–17	Buchholz (3–2)	Gregg (6–4)		48,691	44–42
87	July 5	@ Rockies	12–6	de la Rosa (3–4)	Tucker (2–3)		35,137	44–43
88	July 6	@ Rockies	10–5	Volstad (1–0)	Cook (11–6)		27,168	45–43
89	July 7	@ Padres	3–1	Nolasco (10–4)	Maddux (3–7)	Gregg (16)	23,840	46–43
90	July 8	@ Padres	10–1	Wolf (6–8)	A. Miller (5–8)		24,762	46–44
91	July 9	@ Padres	5–2	Olsen (5–4)	Baek (2–5)	Gregg (17)	31,186	47–44
92	July 10	@ Dodgers	5 – 4 (11)	Nelson (2–0)	Falkenborg (1–2)	Gregg (18)	40,417	48–44
93	July 11	@ Dodgers	3–1	Volstad (2–0)	Stults (2–2)	Gregg (19)	49,545	49–44
94	July 12	@ Dodgers	5–3	Waechter (1–2)	Troncoso (0–1)	Gregg (20)	55,220	50–44
95	July 13	@ Dodgers	9–1	Billingsley (9–8)	A. Miller (5–9)		42,213	50–45
96	July 18	Phillies	4–2	Moyer (9–6)	Nolasco (10–5)	Lidge (21)	23,124	50–46
97	July 19	Phillies	9–5	Olsen (6–4)	Kendrick (8–4)		26,520	51–46
98	July 20	Phillies	3 – 2 (11)	Waechter (2–2)	Condrey (2–2)		17,724	52–46
99	July 21	Braves	4–0	Campillo (5–4)	Volstad (2–1)		14,155	52–47
100	July 22	Braves	4–0	Vandenhurk (1–1)	Morton (2–3)		14,721	53–47
101	July 23	Braves	9–4	Hudson (11–7)	Nolasco (10–6)		16,068	53–48
102	July 24	@ Cubs	6–3	Zambrano (11–4)	Olsen (6–5)	Mármol (4)	41,482	53–49
103	July 25	@ Cubs	3–2	J. Miller (3–2)	Howry (3–4)	Gregg (21)	41,570	54–49
104	July 26	@ Cubs	3 – 2 (12)	J. Miller (4–2)	Gaudin (5–4)	Gregg (22)	41,471	55–49
105	July 27	@ Cubs	9–6	Gaudin (6–4)	Hendrickson (7–8)	Samardzija (1)	41,017	55–50
106	July 28	Mets	7–3	Waechter (3–2)	Smith (1–3)		23,165	56–50
107	July 29	Mets	4–1	Pérez (7–6)	Olsen (6–6)	Wagner (27)	25,032	56–51
108	July 30	Mets	7–5	Johnson (1–0)	Pelfrey (9–7)	Gregg (23)	25,902	57–51
109	July 31	Rockies	12–2	A. Sánchez (1–0)	de la Rosa (5–6)		13,634	58–51

August: 11-17

#	Date	Opponent	Score	Win	Loss	Save	Attendance	Record
110	August 1	Rockies	5–2	Jiménez (8–9)	Volstad (2–2)	Fuentes (19)	16,555	58–52
111	August 2	Rockies	5–3	Nolasco (11–6)	de los Santos (0–1)	Gregg (24)	22,324	59–52
112	August 3	Rockies	3–2	Buchholz (4–3)	Nelson (2–1)	Fuentes (20)	14,310	59–53
113	August 5	@ Phillies	8–2	Johnson (2–0)	Moyer (10–7)		44,896	60–53
114	August 6	@ Phillies	5–0	Kendrick (10–5)	A. Sánchez (1–1)		45,078	60–54
115	August 7	@ Phillies	3–0	Volstad (3–2)	Hamels (9–8)	Gregg (25)	45,521	61–54
116	August 8	@ Mets	3–0	Pérez (8–7)	Nolasco (11–7)	Heilman (1)	50,307	61–55
117	August 9	@ Mets	8–6	Schoeneweis (2–2)	Olsen (6–7)	Heilman (2)	52,484	61–56
118	August 10	@ Mets	8–2	Johnson (3–0)	Pelfrey (10–8)		54,242	62–56
119	August 11	Cardinals	4–2	Piñeiro (5–5)	A. Sánchez (1–2)	Pérez (2)	13,419	62–57
120	August 12	Cardinals	4–3	Volstad (4–2)	Lohse (13–5)	Gregg (26)	14,211	63–57
121	August 13	Cardinals	6–4	Looper (11–9)	Pinto (2–4)	Pérez (3)	15,223	63–58
122	August 14	Cardinals	3–0	Wellemeyer (10–4)	Olsen (6–8)		15,609	63–59
123	August 15	Cubs	6–5	Gaudin (6–4)	Gregg (6–5)	Kerry Wood (25)	28,163	63–60
124	August 16	Cubs	2 -1	A. Sánchez (2–2)	Marshall (2–3)	Gregg (27)	39,124	64–60
125	August 17	Cubs	9–2	Dempster (14–5)	Pinto (2–5)		19,085	64–61
126	August 19	@ Giants	6–0	Nolasco (12–7)	Correia (2–7)		33,098	65–61
127	August 20	@ Giants	6–5	Wilson (1–2)	Lindstrom (1–2)		30,399	65–62
128	August 21	@ Giants	4–3	Wilson (2–2)	Gregg (6–6)		32,515	65–63
129	August 22	@ Diamondbacks	5–4	Rhodes (3–1)	Rauch (4–4)	Gregg (28)	28,201	66–63
130	August 23	@ Diamondbacks	7–1	Petit (3–3)	Volstad (4–3)		44,294	66–64
131	August 24	@ Diamondbacks	5–2	Nolasco (13–7)	Davis (5–8)	Gregg (29)	31,518	67–64
132	August 26	@ Braves	10–9	Ohman (4–0)	Gregg (6–7)		17,539	67–65
133	August 27	@ Braves	4–1	Johnson (4–0)	Hampton (2–2)		19,755	68–65
134	August 28	@ Braves	4–2	Morton (4–8)	A. Sánchez (2–2)	González (7)	20,155	68–66
135	August 29	Mets	5–4	Smith (2–3)	Gregg (6–8)	Ayala (3)	20,043	68–67
136	August 30	Mets	4–3	Lindstrom (2–2)	Heilman (3–8)		28,830	69–67
137	August 31	Mets	6–2	Martínez (5–3)	Olsen (6–9)		16,123	69–68

September: 15-9

#	Date	Opponent	Score	Win	Loss	Save	Attendance	Record
138	September 1	Braves	4–3	Lindstrom (3–2)	González (0–1)		12,209	70–68
139	September 2	Braves	16–14	Julio (1–0)	Lindstrom (3–3)	González (8)	14,092	70–69
140	September 3	Braves	5–3	Waechter (4–2)	Ohman (4–1)	Nelson (1)	11,211	71–69
141	September 5	@ Cardinals	4 – 1 (11)	Rhodes (4–1)	Franklin (5–6)	Lindstrom (1)	42,633	72–69
142	September 6	@ Cardinals	5–3	Wellemeyer (12–6)	Olsen (6–10)	Franklin (15)	42,814	72–70
143	September 7	@ Cardinals	3–1	Wainwright (9–3)	Johnson (4–1)	Pérez (7)	46,045	72–71
144	September 8	@ Phillies	8–6	Blanton (7–12)	A. Sánchez (2–4)	Lidge (35)	38,921	72–72
145	September 9	@ Phillies	10–8	Gregg (7–8)	Kendrick (11–9)	Lindstrom (2)	40,554	73–72
146	September 10	@ Phillies	7–3	Nolasco (14–7)	Myers (9–11)		38,665	74–72
147	September 12	Nationals	2–1	Olsen (7–10)	Martis (0–2)	Lindstrom (3)	12,121	75–72
148	September 13	Nationals	4–2	Johnson (5–1)	Redding (10–9)	Lindstrom (4)	16,307	76–72
149	September 14	Nationals	8–7	A. Miller (6–9)	Shell (2–2)	Rhodes (2)	12,024	77–72
150	September 16	Astros	5–1	Volstad (5–3)	Oswalt (15–10)		12,232	78–72
151	September 17	Astros	14–2	Nolasco (15–7)	Backe (9–13)		14,124	79–72
152	September 18	Astros	8–1	Olson (8–10)	Árias (1–1)		14,219	80–72
153	September 19	Phillies	14–8	Johnson (6–1)	Myers (10–12)		20,202	81–72
154	September 20	Phillies	3–2	Blanton (3–0)	A. Sánchez (2–5)	Lidge (39)	28,757	81–73
155	September 21	Phillies	5–2	Moyer (15–7)	Volstad (5–4)	Lidge (40)	28,173	81–74
156	September 22	@ Reds	7–5	Harang (6–16)	A. Miller (6–10)	Cordero (33)	13,565	81–75
157	September 23	@ Nationals	9–4	Martis (1–3)	Olsen (8–11)		20,657	81–76
158	September 24	@ Nationals	9–4	Johnson (7–1)	Redding (10–11)		23,299	82–76
–	September 25	@ Nationals	Cancelled (rain) No make-up game was scheduled					
159	September 26	@ Mets	6–1	Volstad (6–4)	Pelfrey (13–11)		49,545	83–76
160	September 27	@ Mets	2–0	Santana (16–7)	Nolasco (15–8)		54,920	83–77
161	September 28	@ Mets	4–2	Nelson (3–1)	Schoeneweis (2–6)	Lindstrom (5)	56,059	84–77

== Player stats ==
=== Batting ===
Note: G = Games played; AB = At bats; R = Runs scored; H = Hits; 2B = Doubles; 3B = Triples; HR = Home runs; RBI = Runs batted in; AVG = Batting average; SB = Stolen bases

Player	G	AB	R	H	2B	3B	HR	RBI	AVG	SB
Jorge Cantú	155	628	92	174	41	0	29	95	.277	6
Hanley Ramírez	153	589	125	177	34	4	33	67	.301	35
Dan Uggla	146	531	97	138	37	1	32	92	.260	5
Cody Ross	145	461	59	120	29	5	22	73	.260	6
Jeremy Hermida	142	502	74	125	22	3	17	61	.249	6
Mike Jacobs	141	477	67	118	27	2	32	93	.247	1
Luis Gonzalez	136	341	30	89	26	1	8	47	.261	1
Wes Helms	132	251	28	61	11	0	5	31	.243	0
Alfredo Amezaga	125	311	41	82	13	5	3	32	.264	8
Josh Willingham	102	351	54	89	21	5	15	51	.254	3
Kevin Gregg	69	1	0	0	0	0	0	0	.000	0
Matt Lindstrom	65	0	0	0	0	0	0	0	.000	0
Matt Treanor	65	206	18	49	7	0	2	23	.238	1
Renyel Pinto	62	1	0	0	0	0	0	0	.000	0
John Baker	61	197	32	59	14	0	5	32	.299	0
Joe Nelson	55	1	1	0	0	0	0	0	.000	0
Logan Kensing	46	2	0	0	0	0	0	0	.000	0
Doug Waechter	44	6	0	1	0	0	0	0	.167	0
Robert Andino	44	63	7	13	2	0	2	9	.206	0
Justin Miller	42	1	0	0	0	0	0	0	.000	0
Mark Hendrickson	35	35	4	9	2	1	0	1	.257	0
Mike Rabelo	34	109	9	22	1	0	3	10	.202	0
Scott Olsen	33	62	1	8	0	0	0	3	.129	0
Ricky Nolasco	32	63	1	9	2	0	0	5	.143	0
Andrew Miller	27	30	1	2	0	0	0	3	.067	0
Brett Carroll	26	17	5	1	0	1	0	1	.059	0
Arthur Rhodes	25	0	0	0	0	0	0	0	.000	0
Taylor Tankersley	25	0	0	0	0	0	0	0	.000	0
Paul Lo Duca	21	34	3	10	2	0	0	3	.294	0
Jacque Jones	18	37	5	4	0	0	0	2	.108	0
Chris Volstad	15	26	2	3	2	0	0	0	.115	0
Josh Johnson	14	30	1	4	2	0	0	2	.133	0
Paul Hoover	13	40	1	8	1	0	0	2	.200	0
Burke Badenhop	12	12	0	1	0	0	0	0	.083	0
Dallas McPherson	11	11	3	2	2	0	0	0	.182	0
Ryan Tucker	11	7	0	0	0	0	0	0	.000	0
Aníbal Sánchez	10	17	0	0	0	0	0	0	.000	0
Cameron Maybin	8	32	9	16	2	0	0	2	.500	4
Lee Gardner	7	1	0	0	0	0	0	0	.000	0
Eulogio De La Cruz	6	2	0	0	0	0	0	0	.000	0
Gaby Sánchez	5	8	0	3	2	0	0	1	.375	0
Rick VandenHurk	4	3	0	0	0	0	0	0	.000	0
Jason Wood	3	2	0	0	0	0	0	0	.000	0
Jesus Delgado	2	0	0	0	0	0	0	0	.000	0
Jai Miller	1	1	0	0	0	0	0	0	.000	0
Team totals	162	5499	770	1397	302	28	208	741	.254	76

=== Pitching ===
Note: W = Wins; L = Losses; ERA = Earned run average; G = Games pitched; GS = Games started; SV = Saves; IP = Innings pitched; R = Runs allowed; ER = Earned runs allowed; BB = Walks allowed; K = Strikeouts

Player	W	L	ERA	G	GS	SV	IP	R	ER	BB	K
Ricky Nolasco	15	8	3.52	34	32	0	212.1	88	83	42	186
Scott Olsen	8	11	3.41	33	33	0	201.2	106	94	69	113
Kevin Gregg	7	8	3.41	72	0	29	68.2	30	26	37	58
Mark Hendrickson	7	8	5.45	36	19	0	133.2	87	81	48	81
Josh Johnson	7	1	3.61	14	14	0	87.1	78	70	56	89
Andrew Miller	6	10	5.87	29	20	0	107.1	78	70	56	89
Chris Volstad	6	4	2.88	15	14	0	84.1	30	27	36	52
Justin Miller	4	2	4.24	46	0	0	46.2	26	22	20	43
Doug Waechter	4	2	3.69	48	0	0	63.1	29	26	21	46
Matt Lindstrom	3	3	3.14	66	0	5	57.1	21	20	26	43
Joe Nelson	3	1	2.00	59	0	1	54.0	16	12	22	60
Logan Kensing	3	1	4.23	49	0	0	55.1	56	56	33	55
Ryan Tucker	2	3	8.27	13	6	0	37.0	34	34	23	28
Aníbal Sánchez	2	5	5.57	10	10	0	51.2	35	32	27	50
Renyel Pinto	2	5	4.45	67	0	0	64.2	33	32	39	56
Arthur Rhodes	2	0	0.68	25	0	1	13.1	1	1	3	14
Burke Badenhop	2	3	6.08	13	8	0	47.1	34	32	21	35
Rick VandenHurk	1	1	7.71	4	4	0	14.0	12	12	10	20
Jesus Delgado	0	0	4.50	2	0	0	2.0	1	1	3	0
Taylor Tankersley	0	1	8.15	25	0	0	17.2	16	16	8	13
Lee Gardner	0	0	10.80	7	0	0	6.2	8	8	4	4
Eulogio De La Cruz	0	0	18.00	6	1	0	9.0	20	18	11	4
Team totals	84	77	4.44	161	161	36	1435.3	767	708	586	1127

== Draft ==
=== Players selected ===
Year	Round	Pick	Player	Position	Nationality	School
2008	1	6	Kyle Skipworth	Catcher	United States	Patriot HS (California)

== Farm system ==
Level	Team	League	Manager
AAA	Albuquerque Isotopes	Pacific Coast League	Dean Treanor
AA	Carolina Mudcats	Southern League	Matt Raleigh
A	Jupiter Hammerheads	Florida State League	Brandon Hyde
A	Greensboro Grasshoppers	South Atlantic League	Edwin Rodríguez
A-Short Season	Jamestown Jammers	New York–Penn League	Darin Everson
Rookie	GCL Marlins	Gulf Coast League	Steve Watson
