= La Sierra High School =

Location
- 4145 La Sierra Avenue; Riverside, California 92505; United States; 33°54′33″N 117°28′45″W

Information
- Type: Public
- Motto: "Soaring high with pride"
- Established: 1969
- Principal: Tania Cabeza
- Staff: 76.07 (FTE)
- Enrollment: 1,461 (2023-2024)
- Student to teacher ratio: 19.21
- Colors: Navy and white
- Mascot: Eagle
- Rival: Norte Vista, Hillcrest, Jurupa Valley High School
- Website: La Sierra High

La Sierra High School, located in Riverside, California, United States, is a public high school in the Alvord Unified School District that was founded on August 28, 1969. Tania Cabeza is the principal. La Sierra High School's official school colors are navy blue and white. Red is the accent color and has been since the school opened.

The two main feeder schools for La Sierra High are Arizona and Villegas intermediate schools. La Sierra's rivals are Norte Vista and Hillcrest, the other public high schools in Alvord Unified.

== Recent events ==
In 2005, La Sierra High School was awarded a 6-year clear accreditation through the Western Association of Schools and Colleges, making it the first comprehensive high school in the entire Inland Empire to earn this distinction.

In the 2007–2008 school year, approximately 3,200 students attended La Sierra High.

Hillcrest High School opened in fall 2012 to relieve crowding at La Sierra.

== Academics and test scores ==
=== Test scores ===
==== API ====
In 2005, La Sierra High School increased its API (Academic Performance Index) to 715 from the 2004 base score of 679. Although it met the school-wide growth target, it did not meet the state subgroup growth targets. To encourage schools to improve achievement for all students, the state computes APIs and sets improvement targets for the different student subgroups at the school.

2005 API base by subgroup
Subgroup	API base
All students	715
African-American	690
Asian	791
Hispanic	676
White/Caucasian	761
Socioeconomically disadvantaged	664
English learners	648
Special education	487

==== CST results ====
In 2005, La Sierra's students met or exceeded the state expectations on the California Standardized Testing and Reporting (STAR) as listed below:

Subject	Freshmen pass rate (%)	Sophomore pass rate (%)	Junior pass rate (%)
Algebra 1	4	2	3
Algebra 2	80	24	6
Biology / Life sciences	20	14	12
Chemistry	--	22	12
Earth sciences	5	20	19
English	39	32	30
Geometry	46	10	6
World history	--	29	--
U.S. history	--	--	39

==== CAHSEE results ====
All data below reflect the percentage of sophomore, junior and senior students who passed the CAHSEE sections.

ELA
Year	Percent passed
2002	65
2003	67
2004	71
2005	65
2006	61

Mathematics
Year	Percent passed
2002	24
2003	40
2004	70
2005	67
2006	91

== Athletics ==
La Sierra is a member of the California Interscholastic Federation (CIF) River Valley League along with Hillcrest, Jurupa Valley, Norte Vista, Patriot and Ramona high schools. They won the boys' state team track title in June 2009 which was the first boys' team track title in Riverside County history.

== Teachers ==
Category	Total # of teachers
La Sierra	120
District	899
County	18,164
State	307,864

Type of credential	Teachers (state)	Teachers (LSHS)
Full	307,864 (94.2%)	114 (95.0%)
University intern	7,668 (2.5%)	3 (2.5%)
District intern	2,690 (0.9%)	2 (1.7%)
Pre-intern	1,150 (0.4%)	0 (0.0%)
Emergency	9,922 (3.2%)	1 (0.8%)
Waiver	1,298 (0.4%)	0 (0.0%)

According to the California Department of Education, in the 2005–2006 school year, teachers at La Sierra had 11.1 years average teaching experience and had spent an average of 10 years teaching in the Alvord Unified School District. The average class size was ~ 34.

== Notable alumni ==
- Rizwan Farook, Islamic terrorist who was one of the perpetrators of the 2015 San Bernardino attack in which 14 people were murdered
- Jesse James, founder of West Coast Choppers 1983-1987
- Mitch Lucker, lead vocalist for the deathcore band Suicide Silence
- Mark Takano - first non white LGBT member of Congress
- Tyree Washington, athlete (track and field)
- Reggie Wyatt, National High School record holder in the 300 hurdles
