= Norte Vista High School =

Location
- 6585 Crest Avenue; Riverside, California 92503; United States; 33°56′58″N 117°28′28″W

Information
- Type: Public
- Opened: September 1961
- School district: Alvord Unified School District
- Principal: Jason Marquez
- Teaching staff: 92.61 (FTE)
- Grades: 9–12
- Enrollment: 1,905 (2023–2024)
- Student to teacher ratio: 20.57
- Colors: Red, white, and black
- Athletics conference: CIF River Valley League
- Nickname: Toros, Novi
- Rival: La Sierra, Hillcrest, Ramona High School, Patriot High School (California)
- Website: nortevista.alvordschools.org

Norte Vista High School is a high school in Riverside, California, part of the Alvord Unified School District.

== History ==
The school evolved from a junior high in the late 1950s to a comprehensive high school in 1961 to serve the growing Arlanza neighborhood. Norte Vista started as a middle school, named Arlington Junior High, from 1958 to 1961. The first graduating class was in 1964. Since 2008, Norte Vista has been an IB World School (International Baccalaureate)

== Name Change ==
In September 2024, it was announced that Norte Vista would change their name and identity, and will be no longer the Braves because of California Law AB 3074-2024 states “require all schools with Native American imagery will be removed”. By July 2026, all Native American imagery will be removed from all schools indefinitely including Norte Vista’s nickname “Braves”.

On February 23, 2026, it was announced that the winner was chosen between Raptors, Dark Knights and the Los Toros (Bulls). And at 10:35 am, it was announced that the winner was chosen, and the name the school chose was the Los Toros(Bulls) and will begin the process of removing all Braves banners, clothing and others.

Norte Vista High School will have all of Braves stuff removed after July 1st, 2026, and the start of the Newest Norte Vista Bulls history after 64 Years of Braves.

== Athletics ==
The baseball team made school history when Ron Edmondson Won the 1988 CIF 2-A Championship, defeating Bloomington 8-4, for Norte Vista Braves first title.

The boys' soccer team won league championship for eight consecutive years from 2014 through 2021. In 2021, they were California state finalists for the 3rd division and in 2022 they were state semifinalists.

== Notable alumni ==
- Frank Corral, former NFL placekicker
- John Lowenstein, baseball player
- Brian Edmondson, Part of 1988 CIF State Championship as Pitcher. Third-Round selection by Detroit Tigers in the 1991 Amateur Draft.
- Wayne Housie, Part of 1988 CIF State Championship as Right Fielder. Housie was originally drafted by the Detroit Tigers in the eighth round of the January 1986 amateur draft.
