= River Valley League =

- Purpose: athletic/educational
- Members: 6 member schools
- Main organ: CIF Southern Section

The River Valley League is a high school athletic league in California, United States, that is part of the CIF Southern Section. Member schools are located in Riverside and Jurupa Valley. Moreno Valley High School left the league to join the Mountain Valley League.

== History ==
The River Valley League (RVL) is a California high school athletic league within the CIF Southern Section, primarily featuring schools from Riverside and Jurupa Valley. It acta as a competitive sports conference for regional high schools, with notable members including La Sierra and Ramona.

Historically known for strong football performances, the league has produced multiple playoff contenders and competitive like Ramona, Norte Vista, and Hillcrest.

== Members ==
- Rubidoux High School Falcons
- La Sierra High School Eagles
- Norte Vista High School Toros
- Patriot High School Warriors
- Ramona High School Rams
- Jurupa Valley High School Jaguars
