= Home Gardens, California =

Home Gardens
- census-designated place
- Interactive map of Home Gardens
- Location in the United States
- Coordinates: 33°52′46″N 117°30′43″W
- Country: United States
- State: California
- County: Riverside

Area
  - Total: 1.510 sq mi (3.910 km^{2})
  - Land: 1.510 sq mi (3.910 km^{2})
  - Water: 0 sq mi (0 km^{2}) 0%
- Elevation: 669 ft (204 m)

Population (2020)
  - Total: 11,203
  - Density: 7,421/sq mi (2,865/km^{2})
- Time zone: UTC-8 (PST)
  - Summer (DST): UTC-7 (PDT)
- ZIP code: 92879
- Area code: 951
- FIPS code: 06-34302
- GNIS feature ID: 1656541

Home Gardens is a census-designated place (CDP) in the Inland Empire region of Riverside County, California, United States. It is within the City of Corona's sphere of influence. The population was 11,203 at the 2020 census, down from 11,507 at the 2010 census.

== Geography ==
Home Gardens is located at 33°52′46″N 117°30′43″W (33.879450, -117.511951).

According to the United States Census Bureau, the CDP has a total area of 1.5 square miles (3.9 km^{2}), all of it land.

== Demographics ==
Historical population
Census	Pop.	Note	%±
1960	1,541		—
1970	5,116		232.0%
1980	5,783		13.0%
1990	7,780		34.5%
2000	9,461		21.6%
2010	11,570		22.3%
2020	11,203		−3.2%
U.S. Decennial Census; 1860–1870 1880-1890; 1900 1910 1920; 1930 1940 1950; 1960 1970 1980; 1990 2000 2010

Home Gardens first appeared as an unincorporated place in the 1960 U.S. census; and as a census designated place in the 1980 United States census.

=== Racial and ethnic composition ===
Home Gardens CDP, California – Racial and ethnic composition Note: the US Census treats Hispanic/Latino as an ethnic category. This table excludes Latinos from the racial categories and assigns them to a separate category. Hispanics/Latinos may be of any race.
Race / Ethnicity (NH = Non-Hispanic)	Pop 2000	Pop 2010	Pop 2020	% 2000	% 2010	% 2020
White alone (NH)	2,267	1,866	1,543	23.96%	16.13%	13.77%
Black or African American alone (NH)	294	299	255	3.11%	2.58%	2.28%
Native American or Alaska Native alone (NH)	40	35	31	0.42%	0.30%	0.28%
Asian alone (NH)	413	648	764	4.37%	5.60%	6.82%
Native Hawaiian or Pacific Islander alone (NH)	11	42	26	0.12%	0.36%	0.23%
Other race alone (NH)	18	19	46	0.19%	0.16%	0.41%
Mixed race or Multiracial (NH)	125	137	183	1.32%	1.18%	1.63%
Hispanic or Latino (any race)	6,293	8,524	8,355	66.52%	73.67%	74.58%
Total	9,461	11,570	11,203	100.00%	100.00%	100.00%

=== 2020 census ===
As of the 2020 census, Home Gardens had a population of 11,203 and a population density of 7,419.2 inhabitants per square mile (2,864.6/km^{2}). The median age was 34.5 years. The age distribution was 25.6% under the age of 18, 11.0% aged 18 to 24, 27.5% aged 25 to 44, 24.0% aged 45 to 64, and 11.8% who were 65 years of age or older. For every 100 females there were 100.6 males, and for every 100 females age 18 and over there were 100.0 males age 18 and over.

The census reported that 100.0% of residents lived in urban areas, while 0.0% lived in rural areas.

The whole population lived in households. There were 2,799 households, out of which 48.0% had children under the age of 18 living in them. Of all households, 57.8% were married-couple households, 6.3% were cohabiting-couple households, 14.2% were households with a male householder and no spouse or partner present, and 21.6% were households with a female householder and no spouse or partner present. About 10.5% of all households were made up of individuals, and 4.9% had someone living alone who was 65 years of age or older. The average household size was 4.0. There were 2,362 families (84.4% of all households).

There were 2,895 housing units, of which 2,799 (96.7%) were occupied and 96 (3.3%) were vacant. Of the occupied units, 69.5% were owner-occupied and 30.5% were occupied by renters. The homeowner vacancy rate was 1.5% and the rental vacancy rate was 3.4%.

Racial composition as of the 2020 census
Race	Number	Percent
White	2,636	23.5%
Black or African American	277	2.5%
American Indian and Alaska Native	263	2.3%
Asian	775	6.9%
Native Hawaiian and Other Pacific Islander	31	0.3%
Some other race	4,793	42.8%
Two or more races	2,428	21.7%

=== Income and poverty ===
In 2023, the US Census Bureau estimated that the median household income was $92,344, and the per capita income was $29,523. About 4.7% of families and 6.6% of the population were below the poverty line.

=== 2010 census ===
At the 2010 census Home Gardens had a population of 11,570. The population density was 7,435.7 inhabitants per square mile (2,870.9/km^{2}). The racial makeup of Home Gardens was 5,275 (45.6%) White, 364 (3.1%) African American, 126 (1.1%) Native American, 667 (5.8%) Asian, 51 (0.4%) Pacific Islander, 4,500 (38.9%) from other races, and 587 (5.1%) from two or more races. Hispanic or Latino of any race were 8,524 persons (73.7%).

The census reported that 11,562 people (99.9% of the population) lived in households, 8 (0.1%) lived in non-institutionalized group quarters, and no one was institutionalized.

There were 2,760 households, 1,553 (56.3%) had children under the age of 18 living in them, 1,687 (61.1%) were opposite-sex married couples living together, 434 (15.7%) had a female householder with no husband present, 215 (7.8%) had a male householder with no wife present. There were 172 (6.2%) unmarried opposite-sex partnerships, and 17 (0.6%) same-sex married couples or partnerships. 306 households (11.1%) were one person and 123 (4.5%) had someone living alone who was 65 or older. The average household size was 4.19. There were 2,336 families (84.6% of households); the average family size was 4.35.

The age distribution was 3,618 people (31.3%) under the age of 18, 1,404 people (12.1%) aged 18 to 24, 3,358 people (29.0%) aged 25 to 44, 2,328 people (20.1%) aged 45 to 64, and 862 people (7.5%) who were 65 or older. The median age was 29.3 years. For every 100 females, there were 107.6 males. For every 100 females age 18 and over, there were 104.4 males.

There were 2,865 housing units at an average density of 1,841.3 per square mile, of the occupied units 1,952 (70.7%) were owner-occupied and 808 (29.3%) were rented. The homeowner vacancy rate was 2.3%; the rental vacancy rate was 2.5%. 7,749 people (67.0% of the population) lived in owner-occupied housing units and 3,813 people (33.0%) lived in rental housing units.

== Government ==
=== Municipal ===
In the Riverside County Board of Supervisors, Home Gardens is in the Second District, represented by Karen Spiegel.

=== State ===
In the California State Senate, Home Gardens is in the 31st senatorial district, represented by Democrat Sabrina Cervantes. In the California State Assembly, Home Gardens is in the 58th Assembly district, represented by Republican Leticia Castillo.

=== Federal ===
In the United States House of Representatives, Home Gardens is in California's 39th congressional district, represented by Democrat Mark Takano. Democrats Alex Padilla and Adam Schiff represent California in the United States Senate.

== Education ==
The western portion of Home Gardens is under the jurisdiction of the Corona-Norco Unified School District. Home Gardens Elementary School on 13550 Tolton Avenue is the primary and only school in the Home Gardens unincorporated area.

Current zoning for graduates from Home Gardens Elementary are directed to Citrus Hills Intermediate School in Corona. From Citrus Hills Intermediate, graduates are then directed to Santiago High School, also in Corona.

The eastern portion of Home Gardens is under the jurisdiction of the Alvord Unified School District, which also serves portions of Riverside and Corona. Home Gardens students there are currently zoned to Promenade Elementary School in Corona, Ysmael Villegas Middle School in Riverside and Hillcrest High School, also in Riverside.

The Riverside County Library System offers local residents a branch on 3785 Neece Street. The YMCA is active in both the elementary school and library.

Students who live in Home Gardens fall within the Riverside Community College District. The District's nearest campus is Norco College at 2001 3rd Street in Norco, and the Riverside City College campus is also nearby, located on Magnolia Avenue in Riverside.
