= Hillcrest High School (Riverside, California) =

Location
- 11800 Indiana Ave. Riverside, California 92503; United States; 33.889722°N 117.485529°W

Information
- Type: Public
- Opened: 2012
- School district: Alvord Unified School District
- Principal: Amanda Bentley
- Teaching staff: 77.60 (FTE)
- Grades: 9-12
- Enrollment: 1,782 (2023-2024)
- Student to teacher ratio: 22.96
- Colors: Cardinal; Gold; White
- Mascot: Trojans
- Rival: La Sierra High School, Norte Vista High School
- Website: hillcrest.alvordschools.org

Hillcrest High School (Riverside, California) is a public high school in Riverside, California, United States. Students from Ysmael Villegas Middle School, Arizona Middle School and transfers attend Hillcrest.

== History ==
Hillcrest High School was completed in 2011 for $105 million and intended to relieve the overcrowded La Sierra High School, but did not open until August 2012 because the school district lacked the $4 million yearly operating budget. It cost $1 million to keep the campus secure while closed.

== Athletics ==
Hillcrest is a member of the California Interscholastic Federation (CIF) River Valley League along with Jurupa Valley High School, La Sierra High School, Norte Vista High School, Patriot High School and Ramona High School.

Hillcrest 2 CIF State championships in both 2024-25 and the 2025-26 seasons.

The first one being Hillcrest woman’s basketball team winning in the CIF-SS 5AA State Championship against Santa Ana High School 39-36 in a comeback in Edison High School (Huntington Beach, California) on March 8, 2025

Then the Hillcrest football team won the CIFSS Division 10 State Championship against Tahquitz High School 63-36 on November 29, 2025.
