= Mark Hendrickson =

American baseball and basketball player (born 1974)

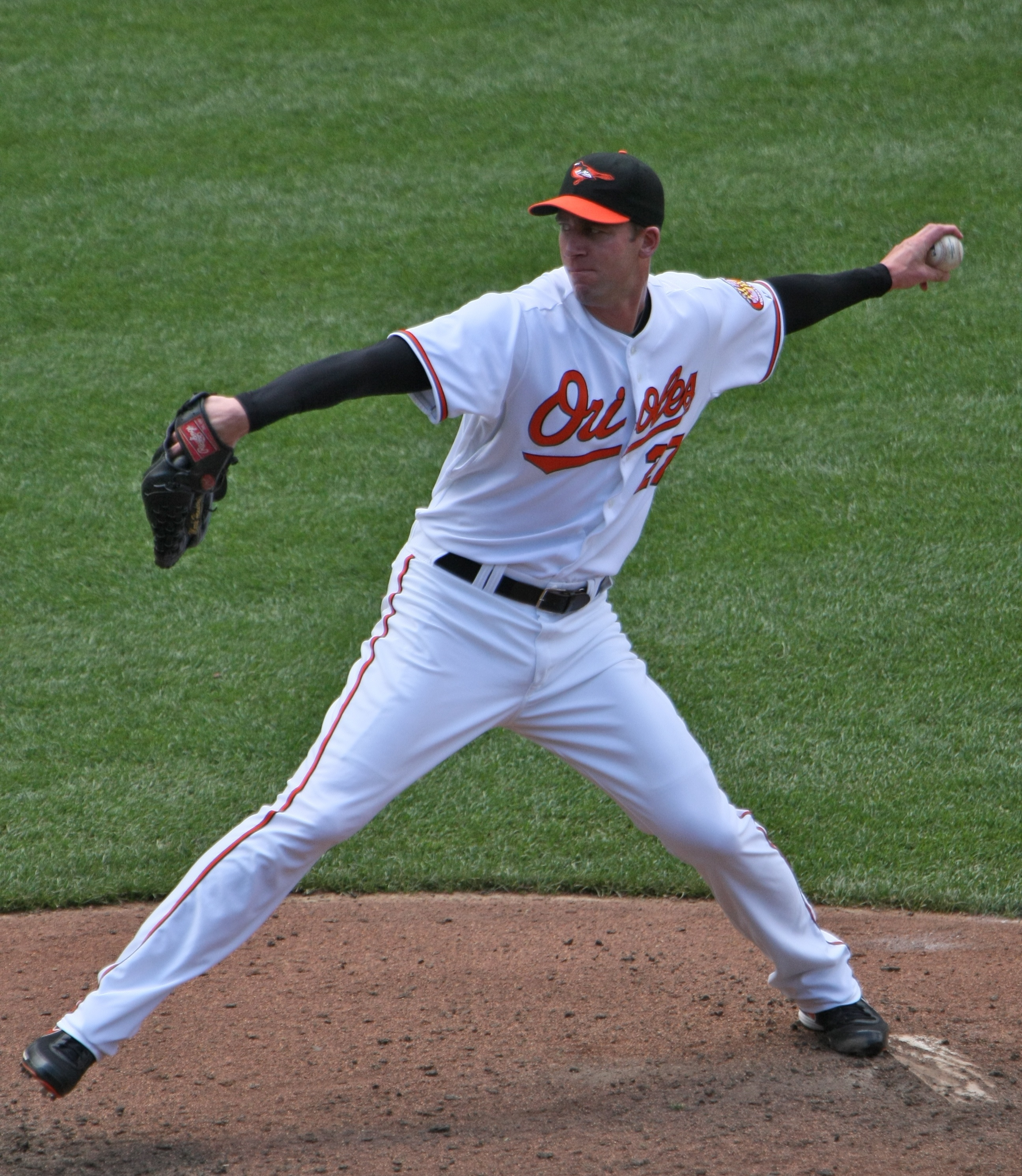
- Hendrickson with the Baltimore Orioles in 2009
- Pitcher
- Born: June 23, 1974 (age 52); Mount Vernon, Washington, U.S.
- Batted: Left Threw: Left

MLB debut
- August 6, 2002, for the Toronto Blue Jays

Last MLB appearance
- August 28, 2011, for the Baltimore Orioles

MLB statistics
- Win–loss record: 58–74
- Earned run average: 5.03
- Strikeouts: 666
- Stats at Baseball Reference

Teams
- Toronto Blue Jays (2002–2003); Tampa Bay Devil Rays (2004–2006); Los Angeles Dodgers (2006–2007); Florida Marlins (2008); Baltimore Orioles (2009–2011)
Basketball career
Personal information
Listed height	6 ft 9 in (2.06 m)
Listed weight	220 lb (100 kg)
Career information
High school	Mount Vernon (Mount Vernon, Washington)
College	Washington State (1992–1996)
NBA draft	1996: 2nd round, 31st overall pick
Drafted by	Philadelphia 76ers
Playing career	1996–2000
Position	Power forward
Number	14, 42
Career history
1996–1997	Philadelphia 76ers
1997	La Crosse Bobcats
1997–1998	Sacramento Kings
1999	La Crosse Bobcats
1999	New Jersey Nets
1999–2000	Cleveland Cavaliers
2000	New Jersey Nets
2000	La Crosse Bobcats
Career highlights
2× First-team All-Pac-10 (1995, 1996)
Career NBA statistics
Points	381 (3.3 ppg)
Rebounds	316 (2.8 rpg)
Stats at NBA.com
Stats at Basketball Reference

Mark Allan Hendrickson (born June 23, 1974) is an American former baseball and basketball player. Hendrickson was a pitcher in Major League Baseball (MLB) and played power forward in the National Basketball Association (NBA) and Continental Basketball Association (CBA). He is one of just 13 athletes to play in both MLB and the NBA, and the most recent to do so. He is a former pitching coach for the Aberdeen IronBirds.

Hendrickson is notable for his size, at 6 feet 9 inches (2.06 m). Hendrickson was a ground ball pitcher, with a fastball in the high 80s and a decent 12–6 curveball. Hendrickson also had a 10–4 slider, but his slider only reached the high 70s to low 80s. Thus, when Hendrickson had success, it was due to control, movement, and location and not power.

== High school career ==
Hendrickson was a three-sport standout in tennis, basketball, and baseball at Mount Vernon High School in the state of Washington. During his sophomore year, he was a member of the state championship baseball team and the runner-up state basketball team. He was a member of the state championship basketball team during his junior year, where he earned recognition as the co-MVP of the tournament for his play. He was also named team captain, team MVP, and named to the All-Area and All-State teams. A tennis state qualifier, Hendrickson was also named to the baseball All-Area team.

As a senior, Hendrickson led the Bulldogs to a second basketball championship. He was team captain, team MVP, All-Area, All-State, and the state basketball tournament MVP. For his performance on the basketball court, he was named the Gatorade State Player of the Year. In addition to his remarkable basketball play, he was able to help his team win the state championship in baseball, while also qualifying for state in tennis. He was named the Skagit Valley Herald Athlete of the Year both his junior and senior years.

== College career ==
Hendrickson starred in both basketball and baseball at Washington State University.

In basketball, he was a two-time selection to the All-Pac-10 first team and he ranks second in Washington State history in rebounds. He averaged 13.9 points per game and 8.6 rebounds per game during his four years at Washington State. He was also selected to All-Conference teams in baseball.

== NBA and MLB drafts ==
The first time Hendrickson was drafted by a baseball team was right after high school when he was selected in the 13th round of the 1992 draft by the Atlanta Braves, but chose to attend college instead. He was also drafted, but did not sign, by the San Diego Padres in the 21st round of the 1993 draft, by the Atlanta Braves again in the 32nd round of the 1994 draft, by the Detroit Tigers in the 16th round of the 1995 draft, and by the Texas Rangers in the 19th round of the 1996 draft.

Upon his college graduation he was selected by the NBA's Philadelphia 76ers (31st overall pick) of the 1996 draft and MLB's Toronto Blue Jays (20th round) of the 1997 draft.

== Professional basketball career ==
Hendrickson elected to play basketball and joined the Philadelphia 76ers, playing in 29 games in the 1996–97 NBA season, averaging 2.9 points and 3.2 rebounds in 10.4 minutes per game. He signed as a free agent with the Sacramento Kings on December 23, 1997, appearing in 48 games, averaging 15.4 minutes, 3.4 points and 3.0 rebounds as a reserve player.

Unsigned by the NBA prior to the 1998 season, he signed with the La Crosse Bobcats of the Continental Basketball Association (CBA) where he played most of the season. He was picked up by the New Jersey Nets for a couple of brief stints during the 1998–99 and 1999–2000 seasons and by the Cleveland Cavaliers for the 1999–2000 season. Frustrated by his inability to get more consistent work, he decided to give up on basketball and concentrate on baseball.

During his NBA career Hendrickson appeared in 114 games, and recorded 381 points and 316 rebounds.

== Minor league baseball career ==
He continued to play semi-pro baseball in the offseason (in York, Pennsylvania) while he was playing basketball and eventually signed with the Blue Jays on May 22, 1998, electing to play minor league baseball during the summer while continuing his basketball career. During this period, he pitched for the Blue Jays Single-A affiliate in Dunedin in 1998 (4–3, 2.37 ERA, 16 games, 5 starts) and the Double-A Tennessee Smokies in 1999 (2–7, 6.63 ERA, 12 games, 11 starts).

In 2000, after abandoning basketball and turning to baseball full-time, he had to refocus his energies on his baseball career. "I was always around baseball," he commented, "but what a lot of people don't realize, and what I didn't realize is that I didn't put in the time and dedication into knowing how to get my arm into shape, how to take care of it, and how to pitch on a regular basis."

He started off the 2000 season back at Dunedin (2–2, 5.61 ERA, 12 starts, one complete game), but was promoted to the Double-A Tennessee Smokies (3–1, 3.63 ERA, six starts). He spent the next two seasons with the Triple-A SkyChiefs (2–9, 4.66 ERA, 38 games, six starts in 2001; 7–5, 3.52 ERA, 14 starts in 2002).

== Major League Baseball career ==
=== Toronto Blue Jays ===
Hendrickson made his major league debut for the Blue Jays on August 6, 2002, against the Seattle Mariners as a reliever. It was a rather bleak first appearance. He worked 1/3 of an inning and allowed 5 runs. The Jays stuck with him and he made his first career start on September 7 against the Boston Red Sox, pitching 5 scoreless innings in a game the Jays lost 4–1. His first victory came in his next start, on September 14 against the Tampa Bay Devil Rays, when he worked six innings, allowed one run and the Jays won 8–4.

He returned to the rotation at the start of the 2003 season and stayed there all year, accumulating a 9–9 record with a 5.51 ERA in 30 starts, with one complete game shutout. Hendrickson is the first pitcher in Toronto Blue Jays history to hit a home run, which he did against the Montreal Expos on June 21, 2003.

=== Tampa Bay Devil Rays ===
On December 14, 2003, he was traded by the Blue Jays along with Sandy Nin to the Colorado Rockies for Justin Speier. The Rockies immediately flipped him to the Tampa Bay Devil Rays for Joe Kennedy. He became a regular member of the Devil Rays' rotation, accumulating records of 10–15 (4.81 ERA) in 2004, 11–8 (5.90 ERA) in 2005, and 4–8 (3.81 ERA) in the first half of 2006.

=== Los Angeles Dodgers ===
He was traded to the Los Angeles Dodgers on June 27, 2006, along with catcher Toby Hall in exchange for Dioner Navarro, Jae Weong Seo and minor league outfielder Justin Ruggiano. He immediately joined the Dodgers' starting rotation, but ineffectiveness caused him to be moved to the bullpen for the end of the season, where he was more effective. His final 2006 numbers with the Dodgers were 2–7, 4.68 ERA in 18 appearances, 12 as a starter. In 2007, he was both a starter and a reliever for the Dodgers, showing more effectiveness out of the bullpen. Hendrickson was not offered a contract by the Dodgers and became a free agent on December 12, 2007.

=== Florida Marlins ===
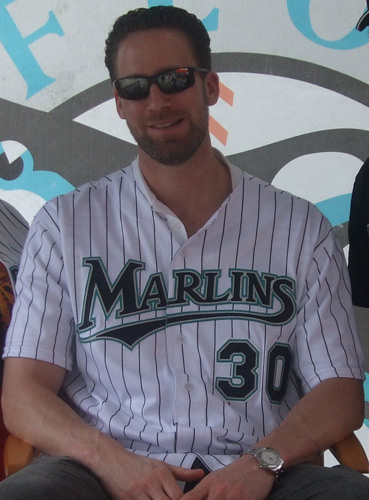
Hendrickson at Florida Marlins Fan Fest 2008.

On January 16, 2008, Hendrickson signed a one-year, $1.5 million contract with the Florida Marlins. On June 9, 2008, Ken Griffey Jr. hit the 600th home run of his career off a fastball thrown by Hendrickson in the 1st inning of a 9–4 loss to the Cincinnati Reds.

On July 7, the Marlins announced that Hendrickson, along with Ryan Tucker, would be moved to the bullpen to make room in the rotation for Josh Johnson and Chris Volstad.

=== Baltimore Orioles ===
On December 31, 2008, Hendrickson signed a one-year deal for the 2009 season with the Baltimore Orioles. He was re-signed for the 2010 season. While with the Orioles, Hendrickson was mostly a relief pitcher, but he made a few starts. On September 11, 2009, he picked up his only major league save by throwing three shutout innings against the New York Yankees. He saved the win for starting pitcher Chris Tillman. The Orioles declined his option for the 2011 season, making him a free agent. However, he later agreed to a minor league deal with the Orioles. This deal included an invitation to big league spring training. In February 2013, he returned to the Orioles organization on a minor league contract. He elected free agency on November 4.

=== York Revolution ===
On March 29, 2014, Hendrickson signed with the York Revolution of the Atlantic League of Professional Baseball. He became a free agent following the season. In 55 games 52.2 innings of relief he went 2–0 with a stellar 1.54 ERA with 34 strikeouts and 9 saves.

=== Baltimore Orioles (second stint) ===
On February 10, 2015, Hendrickson signed a minor league contract with an invitation to spring training with the Baltimore Orioles. He was released on March 16.

Hendrickson retired from baseball on March 31, 2015.

Hendrickson is one of 13 athletes that played in both the National Basketball Association and Major League Baseball. The 13 are: Danny Ainge, Frank Baumholtz, Hank Biasatti, Gene Conley, Chuck Connors, Dave DeBusschere, Dick Groat, Steve Hamilton, Hendrickson, Cotton Nash, Ron Reed, Dick Ricketts and Howie Schultz.

== Pitching style ==
Hendrickson threw four pitches: a four-seam fastball, a curveball, a changeup, as well as a cutter. His fastball varied from 87 to 91 MPH. Hendrickson's curveball had little movement, and sits around 71–76 MPH. His changeup was not very effective, as the 82–84 MPH velocity did not differ enough from his fastball. Hendrickson's cutter was his best pitch and it sat around 82–87 MPH.

== Baseball coaching career ==
Hendrickson was announced as the Aberdeen IronBirds' new pitching coach on February 27, 2017.

== Career statistics ==
Legend
GP	Games played	GS	Games started	MPG	Minutes per game
FG%	Field goal percentage	3P%	3-point field goal percentage	FT%	Free throw percentage
RPG	Rebounds per game	APG	Assists per game	SPG	Steals per game
BPG	Blocks per game	PPG	Points per game	**Bold**	Career high

=== College ===
Year	Team	GP	GS	MPG	FG%	3P%	FT%	RPG	APG	SPG	BPG	PPG
1992–93	Washington State	27	27	**34.3**	.556	**.522**	.712	8.0	**1.9**	**.9**	.3	12.6
1993–94	Washington State	28	18	31.8	.485	.343	.714	7.9	1.6	.7	**.4**	10.5
1994–95	Washington State	**30**	**30**	33.0	**.627**	.412	**.794**	9.0	1.3	.6	.3	16.1
1995–96	Washington State	23	23	33.2	.572	.258	.709	**9.5**	1.6	**.9**	.2	**16.5**
Career		108	108	33.1	.567	.374	.731	8.6	1.6	.8	.3	13.9

=== NBA ===
==== Regular season ====
Year	Team	GP	GS	MPG	FG%	3P%	FT%	RPG	APG	SPG	BPG	PPG
1996–97	Philadelphia	29	1	10.4	.416	**.250**	.692	**3.2**	.1	.3	.1	2.9
1997–98	Sacramento	**48**	1	15.4	.389	.000	.825	3.0	**.9**	**.5**	**.2**	3.4
1998–99	New Jersey	22	**6**	**18.1**	.443	.000	.840	3.1	.6	**.5**	.0	**5.5**
1999–00	Cleveland	10	0	4.7	**.714**	–	**1.000**	1.1	.3	.2	.1	1.2
1999–00	New Jersey	5	0	4.8	.000	–	.500	.4	.6	.0	.0	.2
Career		114	8	13.2	.416	.167	.803	2.8	.6	.4	.1	3.3
