= Anthony Prior =

American football player (born 1970)

No. 37, 40, 25, 27
- Position: Cornerback

Personal information
- Born: March 27, 1970 (age 56); Lowell, Massachusetts, U.S.
- Listed height: 5 ft 11 in (1.80 m)
- Listed weight: 185 lb (84 kg)

Career information
- High school: Rubidoux (Riverside, California)
- College: Washington State (1988–1991)
- NFL draft: 1992: 9th round, 238th overall pick

Career history
- New York Giants (1992)*; New York Jets (1992–1995); Cincinnati Bengals (1996)*; San Francisco 49ers (1996)*; Minnesota Vikings (1996–1997); Kansas City Chiefs (1998)*; Oakland Raiders (1998); Calgary Stampeders (2000–2001); BC Lions (2002); Calgary Stampeders (2003)
- * Offseason or practice squad member only

Awards and highlights
- Grey Cup champion (2001)

Career NFL statistics
- Tackles: 10
- Fumble recoveries: 1
- Stats at Pro Football Reference

Anthony Eugene Prior (born March 27, 1970) is an American former professional football player who was a cornerback for six seasons in the National Football League (NFL) with the New York Jets, Minnesota Vikings, and Oakland Raiders. He was selected by the New York Giants in the ninth round of the 1992 NFL draft after playing college football for the Washington State Cougars. Prior also played for the Calgary Stampeders and BC Lions of the Canadian Football League (CFL).

== Early life ==
Anthony Eugene Prior was born on March 27, 1970, in Lowell, Massachusetts. He attended Rubidoux High School in Riverside, California.

== College career ==
Prior was a member of the Washington State Cougars from 1988 to 1991 and a three-year letterman from 1989 to 1991. He returned two kicks for 23 yards and one punt for 17 yards in 1989. He returned 20 kicks for 424 yards and a Pacific-10 Conference-tying one touchdown in 1990. Prior totaled one interception and 22 kick returns for 530 yards and one touchdown his senior year in 1991. His one kick return touchdown was tied for most in the country that season.

== Professional career ==
Prior was selected by the New York Giants in the ninth round, with the 238th overall pick, of the 1992 NFL draft. He officially signed with the team on July 21. He was released on August 25, 1992.

Prior was signed to the practice squad of the New York Jets on September 9, 1992. He was released on September 29, 1992. He re-signed with the Jets in 1993. He played in all 16 games for the Jets during the 1993 season, recording four tackles, nine kick returns for 126 yards, and one fumble recovery. Prior appeared in 13 games in 1994, totaling four solo tackles, one assisted tackle, and 16 kick returns for 316 yards. He played in 11 games in 1995, posting one solo tackle. He was released by the Jets on March 1, 1996.

Prior was signed by the Cincinnati Bengals on March 14, 1996. He was released on July 15, 1996.

He signed with the San Francisco 49ers on July 19, 1996, but was released on August 20, 1996.

Prior was signed by the Minnesota Vikings on December 4, 1996, and played in three games for the team during the 1996 season. He also appeared in one playoff game that year. He became a free agent after the season and re-signed with the Vikings on April 9, 1997. Prior played in 12 games during the 1997 season before being placed on injured reserve on November 29, 1997. He was released on February 2, 1998.

Prior signed with the Kansas City Chiefs on April 6, 1998. He was released on August 25, 1998.

Prior was signed by the Oakland Raiders on November 4, 1998. He played in four games for the Raiders in 1998 before being released on December 2, 1998.

Prior started all 18 games for the Calgary Stampeders of the Canadian Football League (CFL) in 2000, recording 75 defensive tackles, one special teams tackle, four interceptions, 14 pass breakups, and four kickoff returns for 91 yards. The Stampeders finished the year with a 12–5–1 and lost in the West Final to the BC Lions. He started all 18 games for the second straight season in 2001, totaling 40 defensive tackles, two special teams tackles, one interception, 14 pass breakups, and one forced fumble. The Stampeders finished the season with an 8–10 record. However, they ended up advancing to the 89th Grey Cup on November 25, 2001, where they defeated the Winnipeg Blue Bombers.

Prior played in 13 games for the BC Lions of the CFL in 2002, accumulating 32 defensive tackles, six special teams tackles, one interception, and four pass breakups.

He returned to the Stampeders in 2003 and appeared in ten games for them that season, recording 25 defensive tackles and three pass breakups.

== Personal life ==
In 2003, Prior released a book titled Faith on 40 Yards: Behind the Silver & Gold of the NFL. In 2006, he released another book on the NFL called The Slave Side of Sunday.
