= Jurupa Unified School District =

Public school district in Riverside County, California

Coordinates: 34°00′00″N 117°28′30″W

Address
- 4850 Pedley Road Jurupa Valley, California, 92509; United States

District information
- Type: Public
- Motto: Learning Without Limits
- Grades: K–12
- NCES District ID: 0619260

Students and staff
- Students: 18,768 (2020–2021)
- Teachers: 805.08 (FTE)
- Staff: 903.5 (FTE)
- Student–teacher ratio: 23.31:1

Other information
- Website: www.jurupausd.org

Jurupa Unified School District is a grade K-12 school district in Riverside County, California. It has an enrollment of approximately 20,500 students.

It covers the vast majority of the municipality of Jurupa Valley and a small portion of Eastvale.

The geographic location of the Jurupa Valley area is the upper western corner of Riverside County, north and west of the Santa Ana River and south of the San Bernardino-Riverside County line. The superintendent is Elliott Duchon.

== Board of Education ==
As of May 2026:

- President – Melissa Ragole, Trustee Area 5 (first elected in 2018, term ends in 2028)
- Clerk – Pamela Blynn, Trustee Area 1 (first appointed in September 2025, term ends in 2026) (Note: Blynn was appointed in November 2024 to replace Robert Garcia, who had resigned two weeks prior on October 21, 2024.)
- Trustee – Jenny Felix, Trustee Area 2 (first elected in 2024, term ends in 2028)
- Trustee – Francisco Cueto, Trustee Area 3 (first appointed in March 2026, term ends in 2026) (Note: Cueto was appointed in March 2026 to replace Robert Garcia, who had resigned a month prior on February 18, 2026.)
- Trustee – Raquel Ortiz Cornejo, Trustee Area 4 (first elected in 2024, term ends in 2028)

== Schools ==
=== High schools ===
- Jurupa Valley High School
- Nueva Vista Continuation High School
- Patriot High School
- Rubidoux High School
- The Learning Center

=== Middle schools ===
- Del Sol Academy
- Jurupa Middle School
- Mission Middle School
- Mira Loma Middle School

=== Elementary schools ===
- Camino Real Elementary School
- Del Sol Academy
- Glen Avon Elementary School
- Granite Hill Elementary School
- Ina Arbuckle Elementary School
- Indian Hills Elementary School
- Mission Bell Elementary School
- Pacific Avenue Elementary School
- Pedley Elementary School
- Peralta Elementary School
- Rustic Lane Elementary School
- Sky Country Elementary School
- Stone Avenue Elementary School
- Sunnyslope Elementary School
- Troth Street Elementary School
- Van Buren Elementary School
- West Riverside Elementary School

== See also ==
- List of Riverside County, California, placename etymologies#Jurupa
