= El Sobrante, Riverside County, California =

Census-designated place in California, US

El Sobrante
- census-designated place
- Location in Riverside County and the state of California

- Position in California.
- Coordinates: 33°52′21″N 117°27′45″W
- Country: United States
- State: California
- County: Riverside

Area
  - Total: 7.229 sq mi (18.722 km^{2})
  - Land: 7.229 sq mi (18.722 km^{2})
  - Water: 0 sq mi (0 km^{2}) 0%
- Elevation: 1,283 ft (391 m)

Population (2020)
  - Total: 14,039
  - Density: 1,942.1/sq mi (749.87/km^{2})
- Time zone: UTC-8 (Pacific (PST))
  - Summer (DST): UTC-7 (PDT)
- GNIS feature ID: 2583009

El Sobrante (pronounced [el soˈβɾante]; Spanish for 'The Leftovers', 'The Surplus', 'The Remaining Land') is a census-designated place in the Inland Empire region of Riverside County, California. El Sobrante sits at an elevation of 1,283 feet (391 m). The 2020 United States census reported El Sobrante's population was 14,039.

== History ==
The area was originally named El Sobrante de San Jacinto, with Maria del Rosario Estudilllo de Aguirre receiving a 5 league land grant in 1846. Her husband, José Antonio Aguirre, patented the grant in 1867.

== Geography ==
According to the United States Census Bureau, the CDP covers an area of 7.2 square miles (18.7 km^{2}), all of it land.

== Demographics ==
Historical population
Census	Pop.	Note	%±
2010	12,723		—
2020	14,039		10.3%
U.S. Decennial Census; 1860–1870 1880-1890; 1900 1910 1920; 1930 1940 1950; 1960 1970 1980; 1990 2000 2010

El Sobrante first appeared as a census designated place in the 2010 U.S. census.

=== Racial and ethnic composition ===
El Sobrante CDP, California – Racial and ethnic composition Note: the US Census treats Hispanic/Latino as an ethnic category. This table excludes Latinos from the racial categories and assigns them to a separate category. Hispanics/Latinos may be of any race.
Race / Ethnicity (NH = Non-Hispanic)	Pop 2010	Pop 2020	% 2010	% 2020
White alone (NH)	5,521	5,163	43.39%	36.78%
Black or African American alone (NH)	957	958	7.52%	6.82%
Native American or Alaska Native alone (NH)	24	31	0.19%	0.22%
Asian alone (NH)	2,170	2,765	17.06%	19.70%
Native Hawaiian or Pacific Islander alone (NH)	31	20	0.24%	0.14%
Other race alone (NH)	38	114	0.30%	0.81%
Mixed race or Multiracial (NH)	356	585	2.80%	4.17%
Hispanic or Latino (any race)	3,626	4,403	28.50%	31.36%
Total	12,723	14,039	100.00%	100.00%

=== 2020 ===
The 2020 United States census reported that El Sobrante had a population of 14,039. The population density was 1,942.3 inhabitants per square mile (749.9/km^{2}). The racial makeup of El Sobrante was 42.7% White, 7.2% African American, 0.6% Native American, 20.0% Asian, 0.2% Pacific Islander, 12.4% from other races, and 17.0% from two or more races. Hispanic or Latino of any race were 31.4% of the population.

The census reported that 99.8% of the population lived in households, 0.2% lived in non-institutionalized group quarters, and no one was institutionalized.

There were 4,073 households, out of which 43.0% included children under the age of 18, 74.0% were married-couple households, 3.9% were cohabiting couple households, 12.3% had a female householder with no partner present, and 9.8% had a male householder with no partner present. 8.0% of households were one person, and 3.6% were one person aged 65 or older. The average household size was 3.44. There were 3,601 families (88.4% of all households).

The age distribution was 23.8% under the age of 18, 9.1% aged 18 to 24, 23.3% aged 25 to 44, 30.2% aged 45 to 64, and 13.5% who were 65 years of age or older. The median age was 40.3 years. For every 100 females, there were 96.2 males.

There were 4,133 housing units at an average density of 571.8 units per square mile (220.8 units/km^{2}), of which 4,073 (98.5%) were occupied. Of these, 90.9% were owner-occupied, and 9.1% were occupied by renters.

In 2023, the US Census Bureau estimated that the median household income was $160,331, and the per capita income was $56,071. About 3.1% of families and 5.6% of the population were below the poverty line.

=== 2010 ===
At the 2010 census El Sobrante had a population of 12,723. The population density was 1,764.4 inhabitants per square mile (681.2/km^{2}). The racial makeup of El Sobrante was 7,435 (58.4%) White, 1,010 (7.9%) African American, 73 (0.6%) Native American, 2,240 (17.6%) Asian, 36 (0.3%) Pacific Islander, 1,312 (10.3%) from other races, and 617 (4.8%) from two or more races. Hispanic or Latino of any race were 3,626 persons (28.5%).

The census reported that 12,700 people (99.8% of the population) lived in households, 23 (0.2%) lived in non-institutionalized group quarters, and no one was institutionalized.

There were 3,679 households, 1,865 (50.7%) had children under the age of 18 living in them, 2,788 (75.8%) were opposite-sex married couples living together, 293 (8.0%) had a female householder with no husband present, 159 (4.3%) had a male householder with no wife present. There were 117 (3.2%) unmarried opposite-sex partnerships, and 30 (0.8%) same-sex married couples or partnerships. 308 households (8.4%) were one person and 75 (2.0%) had someone living alone who was 65 or older. The average household size was 3.45. There were 3,240 families (88.1% of households); the average family size was 3.65.

The age distribution was 3,667 people (28.8%) under the age of 18, 1,073 people (8.4%) aged 18 to 24, 3,579 people (28.1%) aged 25 to 44, 3,569 people (28.1%) aged 45 to 64, and 835 people (6.6%) who were 65 or older. The median age was 35.8 years. For every 100 females, there were 96.4 males. For every 100 females age 18 and over, there were 94.5 males.

There were 3,827 housing units at an average density of 530.7 per square mile, of the occupied units 3,365 (91.5%) were owner-occupied and 314 (8.5%) were rented. The homeowner vacancy rate was 1.7%; the rental vacancy rate was 3.7%. 11,498 people (90.4% of the population) lived in owner-occupied housing units and 1,202 people (9.4%) lived in rental housing units.

== Education ==
The western part is in the Alvord Unified School District. The eastern part is in the Riverside Unified School District.
