= Alvord Unified School District =

Public school district in Riverside County, California

Address
- 9 KPC Parkway Corona, California, 92879; United States
- Coordinates: 33°56′00″N 117°28′46″W

District information
- Type: Public
- Grades: K–12
- Established: February 5, 1896
- NCES District ID: 0602430

Students and staff
- Students: 17,682 (2020–2021)
- Teachers: 776.31 (FTE)
- Staff: 831.42 (FTE)
- Student–teacher ratio: 22.78:1

Other information
- Website: www.alvordschools.org

Alvord Unified School District (AUSD) is a school district headquartered in Riverside, California, United States.

The district boundaries include the La Sierra, La Sierra Hills, La Sierra Acres, and Arlanza neighborhoods of the City of Riverside, as well as a tiny portion of the Corona Hills neighborhood of Corona and segments of unincorporated parts of Riverside County, including eastern Home Gardens and western El Sobrante. The district was established in 1896. The first elementary school is now Alvord Continuation High School. The district office moved in February 2016 to 9 KPC Parkway in Corona. The Instructional Materials Center, Warehouse, Nurses Office and Maintenance facilities remain at 10365 Keller Avenue in Riverside, California.

== Schools ==
=== Continuation schools ===
- Alvord High School (Riverside)
- Mission View High School (Riverside)

=== High schools ===
- Hillcrest High School (Riverside)
- La Sierra High School (Riverside)
- Norte Vista High School (Riverside)

=== Middle schools ===
- Arizona Middle School (Riverside)
- Loma Vista Middle School (Riverside)
- Ysmael Villegas Middle School (Unincorporated area)
- Wells Middle School (Riverside)

=== Elementary schools ===
- Arlanza Elementary School (Riverside)
- Collett Collett Elementary School (Riverside)
- Foothill Elementary School (Riverside)
- La Granada Elementary School (Riverside)
- Rosemary Kennedy Elementary School (Riverside)
- Lake Hills Elementary School (Unincorporated area)
- Christa McAuliffe Elementary School (Riverside)
- Myra Linn Elementary School (Riverside)
- Allan J. Orrenmaa Elementary School (Riverside)
- Promenade Elementary School (Corona)
- Phillip M. Stokoe Elementary School (Riverside)
- Terrace Elementary School (Riverside)
- Twinhill Elementary School (Riverside)
- Valley View Elementary School (Riverside)
