= Raymond McNeil =

American football player (born 1984)

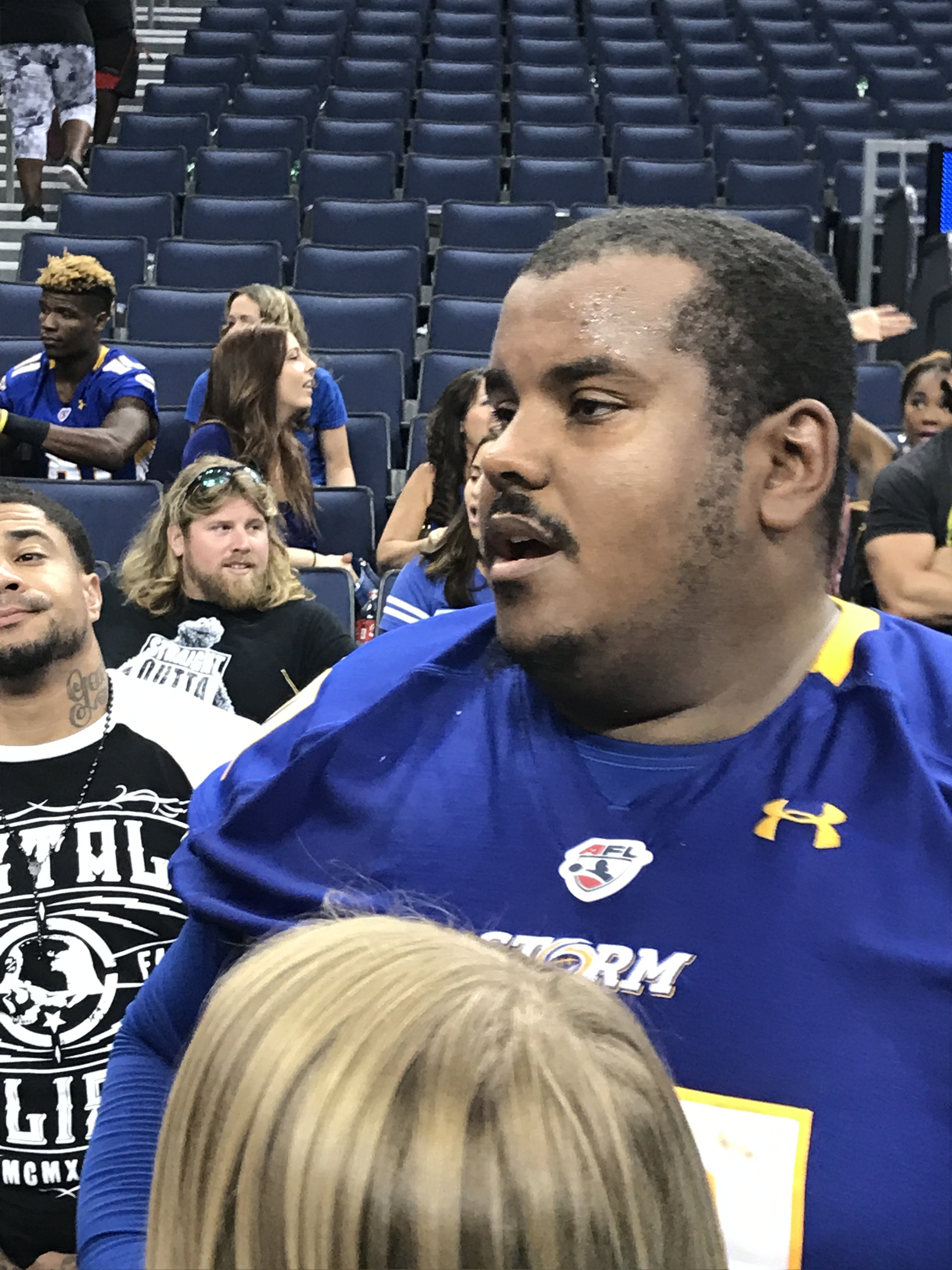
- McNeil with the Tampa Bay Storm in 2017

No. 64, 50
- Position: Offensive lineman

Personal information
- Born: October 14, 1984 (age 42); Riverside, California, U.S.
- Listed height: 6 ft 2 in (1.88 m)
- Listed weight: 325 lb (147 kg)

Career information
- High school: Jurupa Valley (Jurupa Valley, California)
- College: Fort Valley State
- NFL draft: 2006: undrafted

Career history
- Green Bay Blizzard (2008–2009); Milwaukee Iron (2009–2010); Utah Blaze (2011); Spokane Shock (2011); Milwaukee Mustangs (2012); San Jose SaberCats (2013); Tampa Bay Storm (2014); Jacksonville Sharks (2015–2016); Tampa Bay Storm (2017); Shanghai Skywalkers (2018)*; Baltimore Brigade (2018); Atlantic City Blackjacks (2019)
- * Offseason or practice squad member only

Awards and highlights
- First-team All-Arena (2017); 2× First-team All–af2 (2008, 2009); Second-team All-SIAC (2005)

Career AFL statistics
- Tackles: 3
- Fumble recoveries: 1
- Receptions: 1
- Receiving yards: 7
- Stats at ArenaFan.com

Raymond McNeil (born October 14, 1984) is an American former professional football offensive lineman. He played college football at Fort Valley State University and attended Jurupa Valley High School in Jurupa Valley, California. He was a member of the Green Bay Blizzard, Milwaukee Iron/Mustangs, Utah Blaze, Spokane Shock, San Jose SaberCats, Tampa Bay Storm, Jacksonville Sharks, Shanghai Skywalkers, Baltimore Brigade, and Atlantic City Blackjacks.

== College career ==
McNeil played for the Fort Valley State Wildcats from 2002 to 2005. He was the team's starter his final two and a half years. McNeil was a Second Team All-Southern Intercollegiate Athletic Conference selection as a senior.

== Professional career ==
=== Green Bay Blizzard ===
McNeil signed with the Green Bay Blizzard in 2008. He was named First Team All-af2 following the season. McNeil returned to the Blizzard in January 2009.

=== Spokane Shock ===
On May 30, 2011, McNeil was traded with Erik Meyer to the Spokane Shock for Khreem Smith and Antonio Narcisse.

=== Return to Milwaukee ===
McNeil returned to Milwaukee franchise on September 30, 2011.

=== San Jose SaberCats ===
In November 2012, McNeil was assigned to the San Jose SaberCats.

=== Tampa Bay Storm ===
On November 5, 2014, McNeil was retained by the Tampa Bay Storm.

=== Jacksonville Sharks ===
McNeil was assigned to the Jacksonville Sharks on March 25, 2015.

=== Return to Tampa Bay ===
McNeil was assigned to the Storm on January 19, 2017. He earned First Team All-Arena honors in 2017. The Storm folded in December 2017.

=== Shanghai Skywalkers ===
McNeil was selected by the Shanghai Skywalkers in the third round of the 2017 CAFL draft.

=== Baltimore Brigade ===
On March 26, 2018, McNeil was assigned to the Baltimore Brigade.

=== Atlantic City Blackjacks ===
On April 4, 2019, McNeil was assigned to the Atlantic City Blackjacks.
