= Rubidoux High School =

Public high school in California, US

Location
- 4250 Opal Street; Jurupa Valley, California 92509; 33°59′56″N 117°25′34″W

Information
- Type: Public high school
- Motto: We soar with pride!
- Established: 1959
- School district: Jurupa Unified School District
- Principal: Kevin Corridan
- Teaching staff: 67.58 (on FTE basis)
- Grades: 9–12
- Enrollment: 1,323 (2023–2024)
- Student to teacher ratio: 19.58
- Colors: Black; Gold
- Athletics conference: Mountain Valley League
- Mascot: Falcon
- Website: Rubidoux High School

Rubidoux High School is a four-year public high school in Jurupa Valley, California. It is part of the Jurupa Unified School District, and it opened in 1959. It is one of four high schools in the district, the others being Jurupa Valley High School, Patriot High School, and Nueva Vista High School, a continuation school.

As of the 2022–23 school year, the school had an enrollment of 1,407 students and 69.95 classroom teachers (on an FTE basis), for a student-teacher ratio of 20.11.

== History ==
Rubidoux High School has opened its doors in 1959 as the first high school in the "West Riverside" area. The school mascot is Freddy, the Falcon. The football field and stadium was named Edward E. Hawkins Stadium after a prominent community member and former superintendent of the school district.

== Notable alumni ==
- Orshawante Bryant, Arena football player
- Dan Giese, Major League Baseball pitcher for the San Francisco Giants, New York Yankees, and Oakland Athletics
- Duncan Hunter, politician
- Sammy Knight, former University of Southern California and NFL strong safety
- Josesito Lopez, professional boxer
- Chad Marshall, soccer defenseman for the Columbus Crew SC and Seattle Sounders FC of the Major League Soccer.
- Anthony Prior, gridiron football player
- Solomon Wilcots, former NFL safety
