= Kevin Gregg =

American baseball player (born 1978)

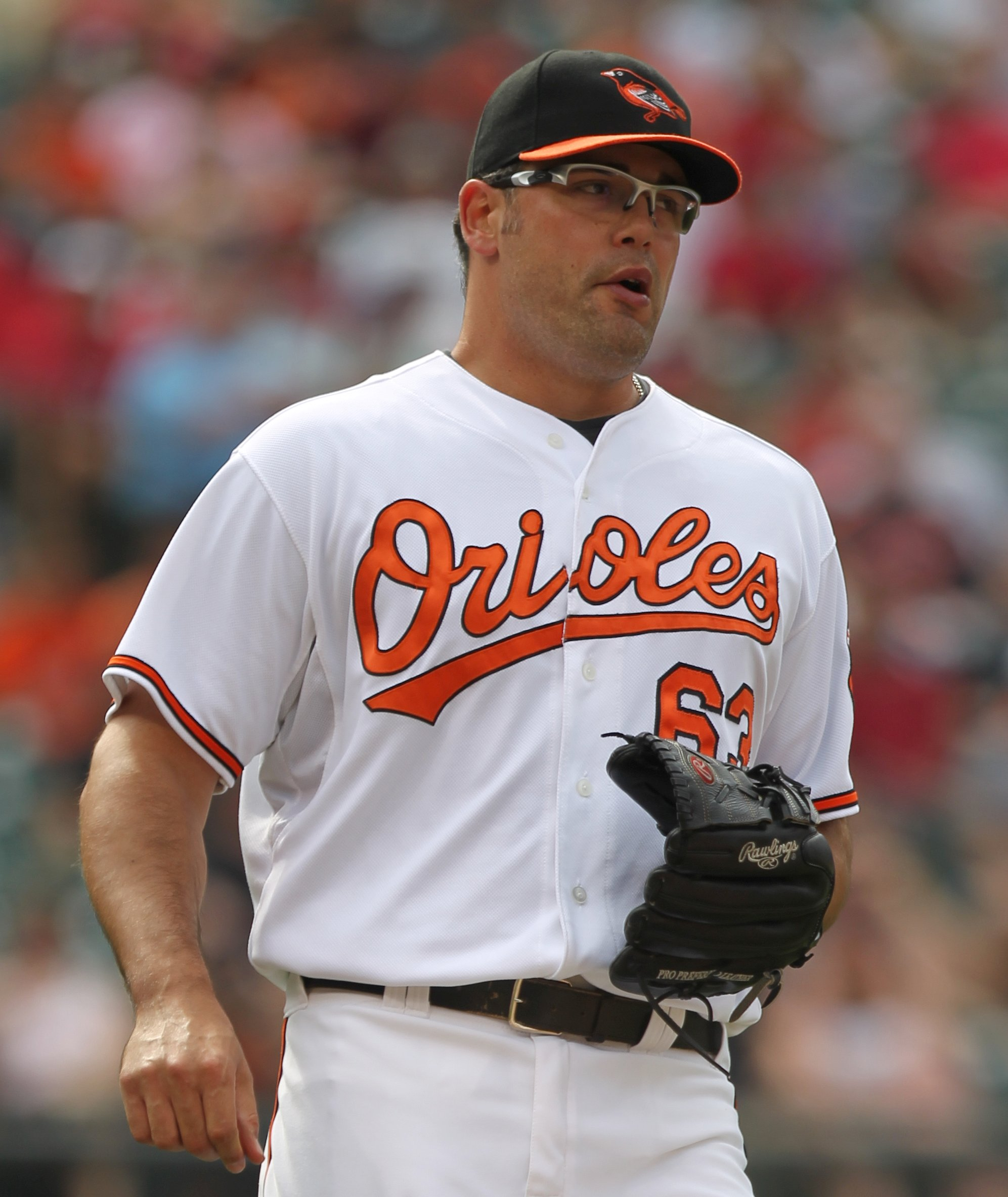
- Gregg with the Baltimore Orioles in 2011
- Pitcher
- Born: June 20, 1978 (age 48); Corvallis, Oregon, U.S.
- Batted: Right Threw: Right

MLB debut
- August 9, 2003, for the Anaheim Angels

Last MLB appearance
- May 7, 2015, for the Cincinnati Reds

MLB statistics
- Win–loss record: 30–46
- Earned run average: 4.24
- Strikeouts: 661
- Saves: 177
- Stats at Baseball Reference

Teams
- Anaheim Angels / Los Angeles Angels of Anaheim (2003–2006); Florida Marlins (2007–2008); Chicago Cubs (2009); Toronto Blue Jays (2010); Baltimore Orioles (2011–2012); Chicago Cubs (2013); Miami Marlins (2014); Cincinnati Reds (2015)

Kevin Marschall Gregg (born June 20, 1978) is an American former professional baseball pitcher. He played in Major League Baseball (MLB) for the Anaheim Angels / Los Angeles Angels of Anaheim, Florida / Miami Marlins, Chicago Cubs, Toronto Blue Jays, Baltimore Orioles, and Cincinnati Reds.

== Early life ==
Gregg was born in Corvallis, Oregon, one of four children of Mary Marschall. His father was 6 feet 11 inches (2.11 m) tall and an older brother, Mark, played college football as an offensive lineman for the University of Oregon.

Gregg attended Corvallis High School and starred in football, basketball, and baseball. As a junior, Gregg threw a 15-strikeout no-hitter against North Eugene High School.

As a football quarterback, he received scholarship offers from Michigan, South Carolina and Florida as well as multiple schools in what was then the Pac-10 Conference. However, Gregg always excelled at baseball due to his strong arm and chose to pursue baseball, declining his college football scholarship offers.

== Professional career ==
Gregg was drafted in the 15th round of the 1996 Major League Baseball draft (435th overall) by the Oakland Athletics. He spent several years in the A's minor league system as a starter up until 2002. On October 15, 2002, he was granted free agency and signed as a free agent with the Anaheim Angels on November 20, 2002.

Before signing with the Angels in 2002, Gregg was approached while working out in his hometown at Oregon State University by Oregon State Beavers football head coach Dennis Erickson who attempted to recruit him back to football. Despite having stalled in the minor leagues up to that point, Gregg felt that, at 24 years old, it was too late for him to begin a college football career. Gregg spent eight seasons in the minor leagues and worked odd jobs during the winter, including at a steel mill, until he decided that they were unduly risky to his health.

=== Los Angeles Angels of Anaheim ===
Gregg made his major league debut with the Angels on August 9, 2003. Gregg spent his next three seasons with the Angels as a spot-starter and a middle reliever. The Angels depth made Gregg expendable and on November 20, 2006, he found himself being dealt to the Florida Marlins for Chris Resop.

=== Florida Marlins ===
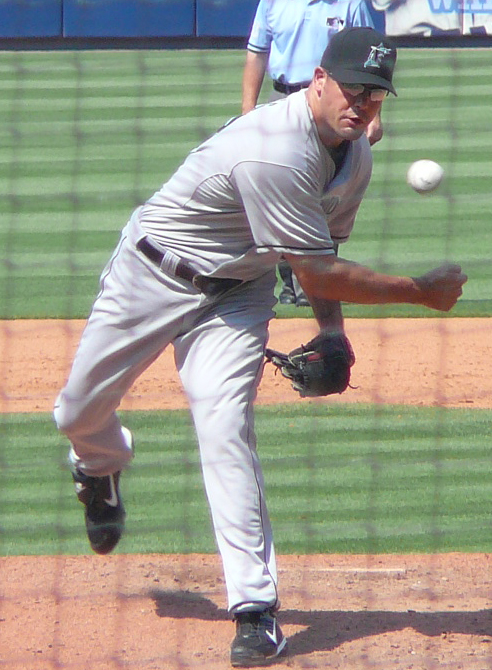
Gregg pitching for the Florida Marlins in 2008.

Gregg began the 2007 spring training competing for the closer role for the Marlins. By the time spring training was completed, he had been relegated back to a middle reliever role after the team made a trade to bring in Jorge Julio.

Gregg took over the closer role for the Marlins after the team went through a couple of options in Julio, who was traded to the Colorado Rockies in mid-May, and Henry Owens, who lost the job after landing on the disabled list in mid-May. Gregg finished the 2007 season with 32 saves in 36 save opportunities with 3.54 ERA, leaving him tied for the 8th most saves in the National League despite not being the closer for the first month and a half.

Gregg continued in the closer role in 2008. As of August 31, 2008, Gregg was 6–8 with a 3.79 ERA, and 29 saves in 38 chances. On August 30, it was reported that Gregg would be out indefinitely with a left knee injury that had reportedly been bothering him for quite some time. Upon his return, he was used mostly in middle relief. In 2008, he tied for the major league lead in blown saves, with 9, and tied for second in losses in relief, with 8.

On November 13, 2008, Gregg was traded to the Chicago Cubs for pitcher José Ceda.

=== Chicago Cubs ===
Gregg competed with Carlos Mármol for the position of closer during the 2009 Spring Training. On March 29, 2009, manager Lou Piniella announced that Gregg had won the closer position and Marmol would serve as set-up pitcher. In August, after blowing three of his last five save chances, Piniella announced on August 18 that Marmol would replace Gregg as closer. Gregg became a set-up man for Marmol.

=== Toronto Blue Jays ===
On February 5, 2010, Gregg signed a 1-year, $2.75 million deal with the Toronto Blue Jays with team options for future years. After signing with the Jays, Gregg, Scott Downs and Jason Frasor were all under consideration for the closer role. Frasor started out the season as the closer, but by mid-April Gregg had taken over as the closer and went on to have a career year. The Blue Jays declined their team options for 2011 and 2012 making Gregg a free agent.

=== Baltimore Orioles ===
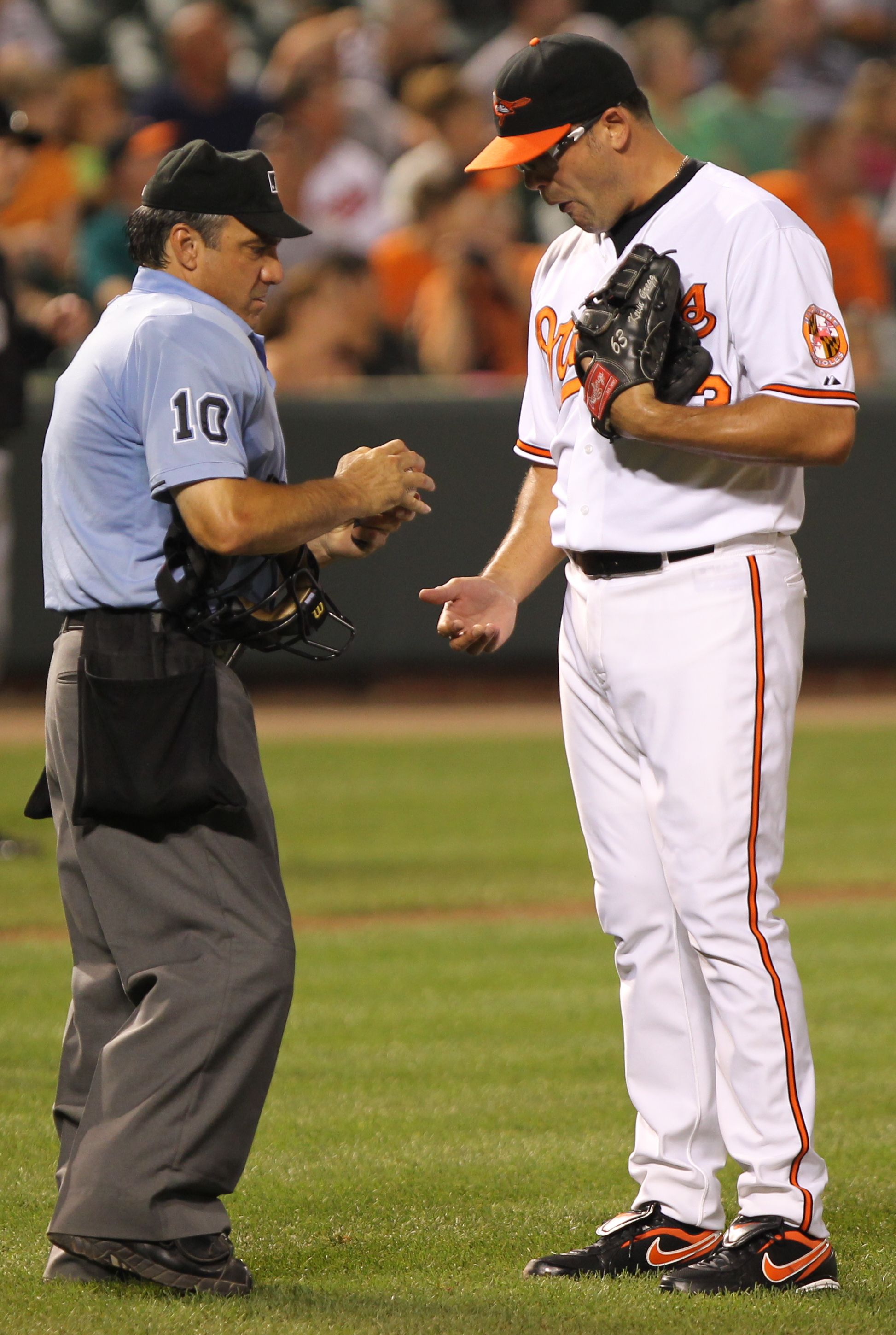
Gregg with umpire Phil Cuzzi in 2011

On January 5, 2011, Gregg agreed to a 2-year, $10 million deal with the Baltimore Orioles with team options for future years.

On July 8, 2011, when trailing the Boston Red Sox by seven runs in the eighth inning, Gregg threw three consecutive inside pitches to designated hitter David Ortiz. Ortiz took exception after the third pitch, accusing Gregg of trying to hit him with a pitch, leading to home plate umpire Mike Estabrook warning both benches. On the next pitch – with a 3–0 count and a 7 run lead in the eighth inning, Ortiz swung at a fastball strike, sending a shallow fly into right-center field. As the ball was in the air, Ortiz began walking to first base. Gregg shouted at Ortiz to, "Run it out!", and was ejected by Estabrook. Ortiz then charged Gregg, who had taken a couple steps off the mound towards home plate. The two began to fight and, after Adam Jones caught the ball in play, both benches cleared. Gregg and Ortiz were ejected. Gregg was unapologetic about the incident, saying that the Red Sox "think they're better than everyone else." On July 14, Major League Baseball suspended Gregg and Ortiz for four games each for their roles in inciting the brawl.

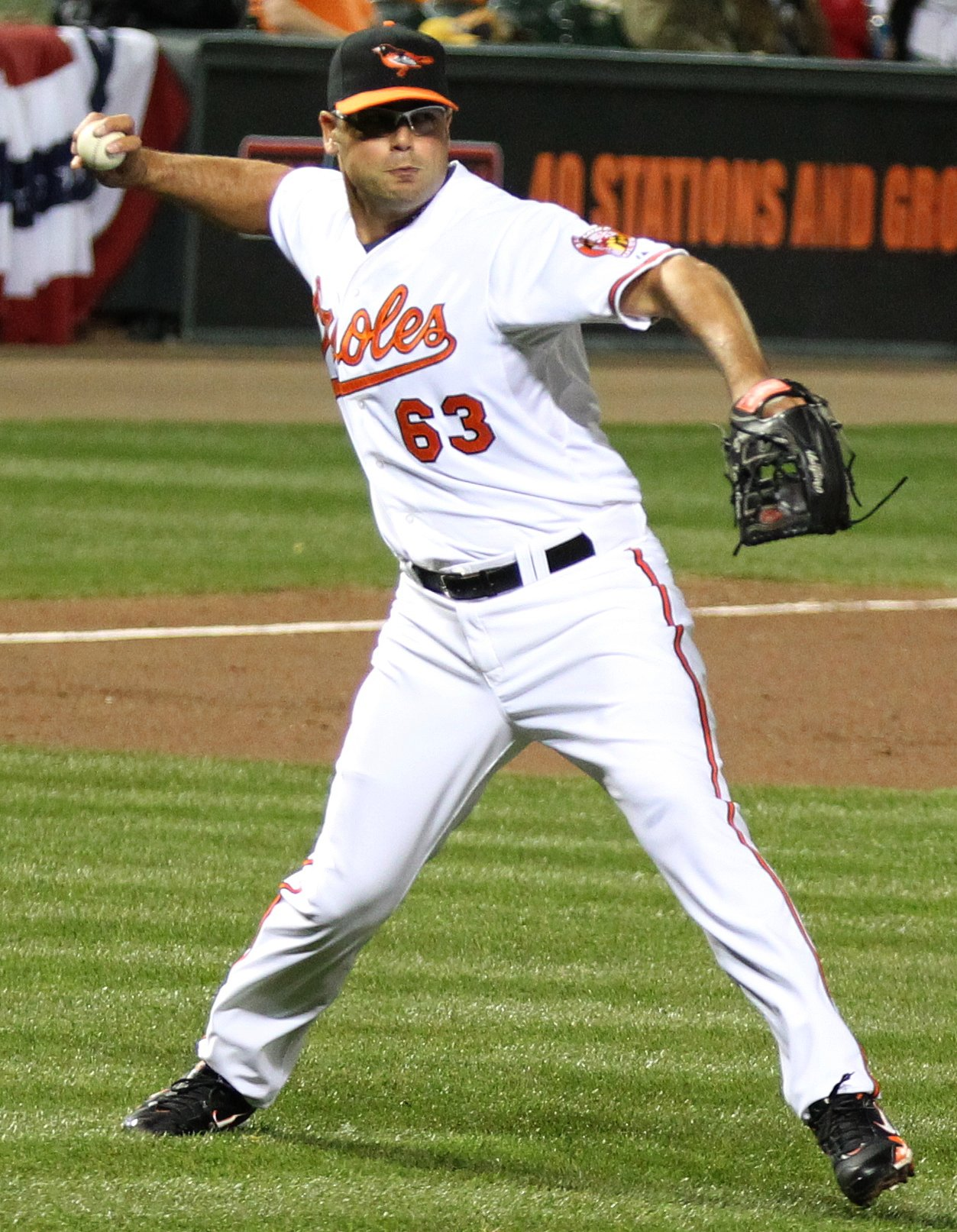
Gregg in action with the Orioles in 2011

Late in 2011, Gregg's closer role was gradually taken over by Jim Johnson.

On September 11, 2012, the Orioles designated Gregg for assignment saying that he wasn't pitching enough to be effective when he did. He was released on September 14.

=== Los Angeles Dodgers ===
On February 10, 2013, he signed a minor league contract with the Los Angeles Dodgers that included an invitation to spring training. He did not make the Major League roster and the Dodgers granted him his release on April 3.

=== Chicago Cubs (second stint) ===
On April 14, 2013, Gregg signed a minor league contract with the Chicago Cubs. Gregg was called up to the majors in late April, was named closer in early May by Cubs manager Dale Sveum, and picked up 33 saves in 38 opportunities with a 2–6 record. He became a free agent following the season.

=== Miami Marlins (second stint) ===
On June 3, 2014, Gregg agreed to terms on a minor league contract with the Miami Marlins. He had his contract selected to the major league roster on June 19. After pitching just 9 innings for Miami, Gregg developed an inflammation in his right elbow and was placed on the 15-day disabled list. He was later placed on the 60-day disabled list, to allow time to remove bone chips in his right elbow. Gregg missed the remainder of the season. He became a free agent following the season.

=== Cincinnati Reds ===
On February 7, 2015, Gregg signed a minor league deal with the Cincinnati Reds. He had his contract selected to the major league roster on April 5. He was designated for assignment and then released on May 11, after posting a 10.13 ERA through 11 appearances.

=== Seattle Mariners ===
On May 20, 2015, Gregg signed a minor league contract with the Seattle Mariners. In seven appearances for the Triple-A Tacoma Rainiers, he recorded a 2.89 ERA with eight strikeouts across 9 1/3 innings pitched. On June 15, Gregg opted out of his contract with the Mariners and became a free agent.

== Personal life ==
Gregg married his high school sweetheart, Nicole Luthy, when he was 20 years old. Their daughter, Ryann, also attended Corvallis High School.
