= Logan Kensing =

American baseball player (born 1982)

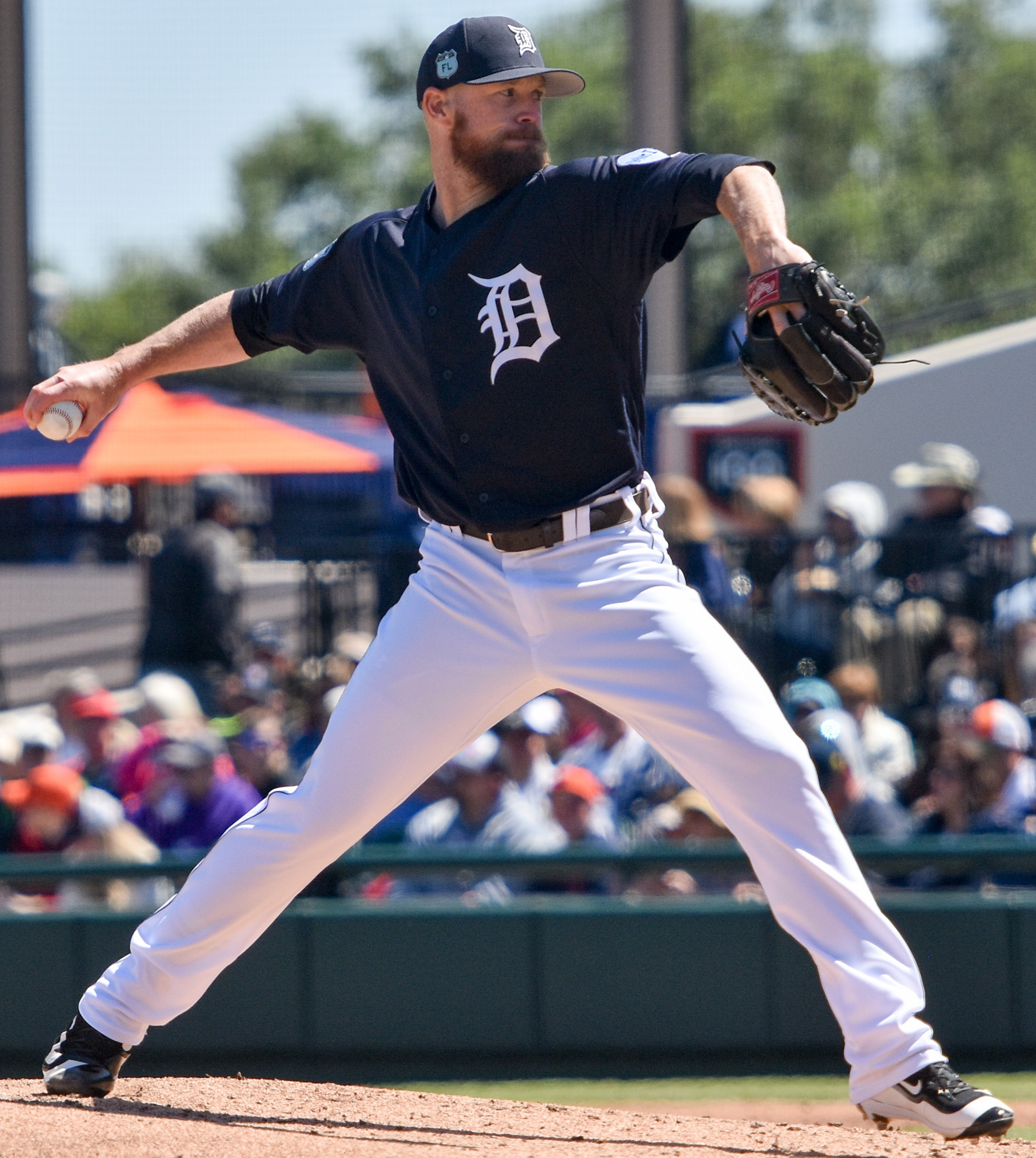
- Kensing pitching for the Detroit Tigers
- Pitcher
- Born: July 3, 1982 (age 43); Boerne, Texas, U.S.
- Batted: Right Threw: Right

MLB debut
- September 10, 2004, for the Florida Marlins

Last MLB appearance
- April 11, 2016, for the Detroit Tigers

MLB statistics
- Win–loss record: 10–10
- Earned run average: 5.70
- Strikeouts: 158
- Stats at Baseball Reference

Teams
- Florida Marlins (2004–2009); Washington Nationals (2009); Colorado Rockies (2013); Seattle Mariners (2015); Detroit Tigers (2016)

Logan French Kensing (born July 3, 1982) is an American former professional baseball pitcher. He played in Major League Baseball (MLB) for the Florida Marlins, Washington Nationals, Colorado Rockies, Seattle Mariners, and Detroit Tigers.

== Playing career ==
=== Florida Marlins ===
Kensing was drafted by the Florida Marlins in the 2nd round of the 2003 Major League Baseball draft out of Texas A&M University.

Kensing made his Major League Baseball debut on September 10, 2004.

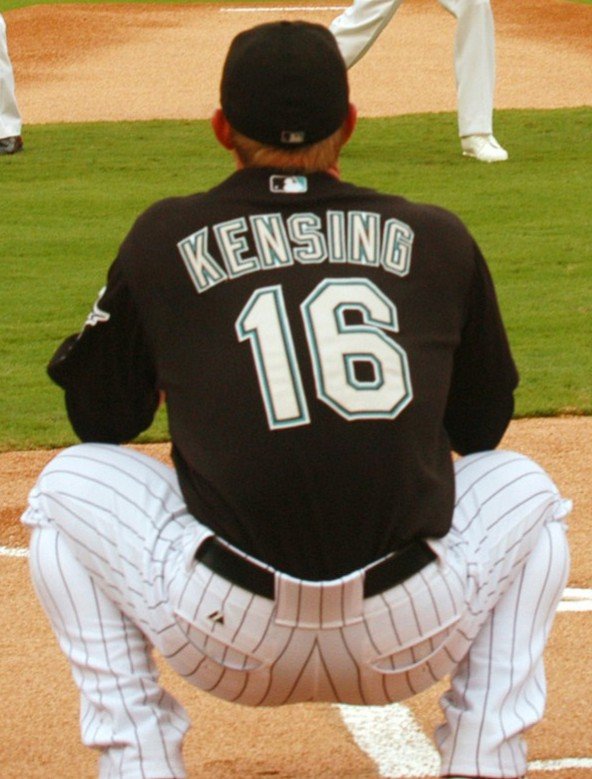
Kensing during his tenure with the Florida Marlins in 2006

=== Washington Nationals ===
After being designated for assignment by the Marlins, Kensing was traded to the Washington Nationals in exchange for Kyle Gunderson on April 29, 2009. In August 2009, the Nationals designated him for assignment again.

On December 15, 2009, Kensing was re-signed by the Nationals with an invite to spring training. On March 17, 2010, the Nationals released Kensing.

=== Tampa Bay Rays ===
On April 7, 2010, Kensing signed a minor league contract with the Tampa Bay Rays. However, he was forced to undergo two shoulder surgeries during the season and missed the whole year. He was released on May 9.

=== Bridgeport Bluefish ===
On April 2, 2011, Kensing signed with the Bridgeport Bluefish of the Atlantic League of Professional Baseball. He appeared in 9 games for Bridgeport, recording a 1.59 ERA with 16 strikeouts across 11 1/3 innings of relief.

=== New York Yankees ===
On June 29, 2011, Kensing signed a minor league contract with the New York Yankees. He became a free agent following the season on November 2.

=== Pittsburgh Pirates ===
On January 4, 2012, Kensing signed a minor league contract with the Pittsburgh Pirates. He became a free agent following the season on November 2.

=== Colorado Rockies ===
On December 11, 2012, Kensing signed a minor league contract with the Colorado Rockies. Kensing was called up by the Rockies from the Triple-A Colorado Springs Sky Sox on June 16, 2013, and made his Rockies debut on June 19 against the Toronto Blue Jays. He was designated for assignment on June 21, 2013, he cleared waivers and was sent outright to Triple-A Colorado Springs Sky Sox on June 24. He became a free agent on October 1.

=== Seattle Mariners ===
On January 17, 2014, Kensing signed a minor league contract with the Seattle Mariners. He became a free agent following the season on November 2.

=== Chicago White Sox ===
On November 20, 2014, Kensing signed a minor league contract with the Chicago White Sox. He was released on April 5.

=== Seattle Mariners (second stint) ===
On May 13, 2015, Kensing signed a minor league contract with the Seattle Mariners. He was called up from the Triple-A Tacoma Rainiers on August 23. For the first time since October 4, 2011, Kensing got the win against the Houston Astros on September 1, pitching a scoreless seventh inning. He was released on October 19. During the 2015 season, Kensing appeared in 19 games for the Mariners, where he compiled a 2–1 record with a 5.87 ERA. He had 13 strikeouts in 15 1/3 innings pitched.

=== Detroit Tigers ===
On December 23, 2015, Kensing signed a minor league contract with the Detroit Tigers, and was invited to spring training. After a solid spring training (2.61 ERA in 10 1/3 innings) and injuries to Alex Wilson and Blaine Hardy, Kensing was added to the Detroit Tigers major league roster to start the 2016 season. He was designated for assignment on April 18, 2016, when they activated Blaine Hardy from the 15-day DL. He was sent outright to the Toledo Mud Hens two days later.

On November 17, 2016, Kensing re–signed with the Tigers on a minor league contract. Kensing spent the 2017 season with Triple–A Toledo, making 66 appearances and recording a 2.54 ERA with 57 strikeouts in 74 1/3 innings of work. He elected free agency following the season on November 6, 2017.

=== Somerset Patriots ===
On March 26, 2018, Kensing signed with the Somerset Patriots of the Atlantic League of Professional Baseball. In 55 appearances for Somerset, he posted a 3–4 record and 4.00 ERA with 55 strikeouts across 54 innings of work. Kensing became a free agent following the 2018 season.
