= Jai Miller =

American baseball player (born 1985)

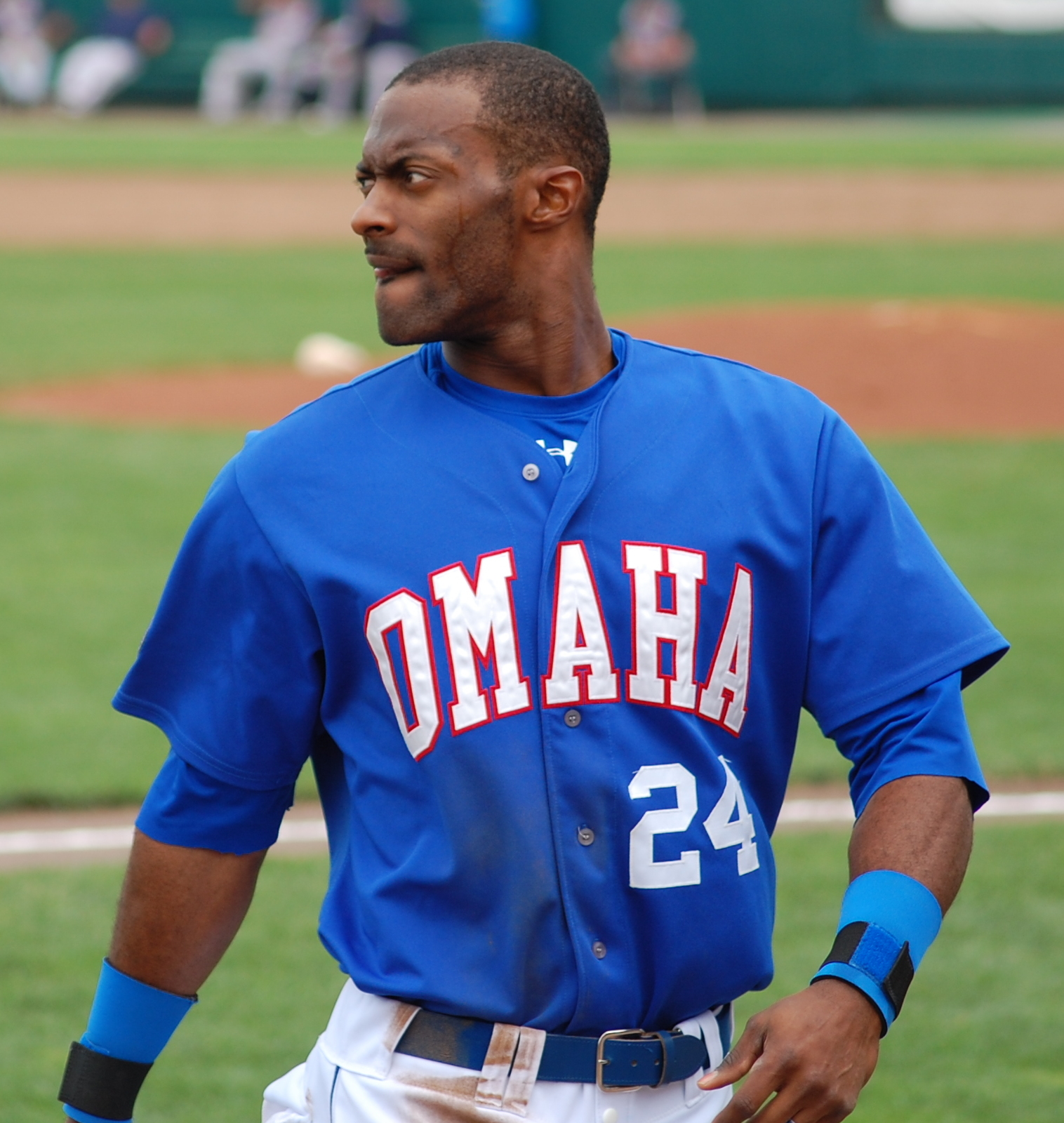
- Miller with the Omaha Royals in 2010
- Outfielder
- Born: January 17, 1985 (age 41); Selma, Alabama, U.S.
- Batted: Right Threw: Right

MLB debut
- June 22, 2008, for the Florida Marlins

Last MLB appearance
- September 28, 2011, for the Oakland Athletics

MLB statistics
- Batting average: .235
- Home runs: 2
- Runs batted in: 6
- Stats at Baseball Reference

Teams
- Florida Marlins (2008); Kansas City Royals (2010); Oakland Athletics (2011)

Randall Jai Miller (born January 17, 1985) is an American former professional baseball outfielder. He played in Major League Baseball (MLB) for three seasons with the Florida Marlins, Kansas City Royals, and Oakland Athletics. He played for the University of Alabama Crimson Tide as a walk-on defensive back on their football team.

== Baseball career ==
=== Florida Marlins ===
Miller was drafted out of high school by the Florida Marlins in the fourth round (113th overall) of the 2003 Major League Baseball draft. He made his professional career debut that year for the Single-A Jamestown Jammers, playing in 11 games and batting .233 with no home runs.

In 2004, Miller played for the Single-A Greensboro Bats. In 113 games, he batted .205 with 12 home runs. Miller put up similar stats in 2005, playing for the Single-A Greensboro Grasshoppers (the team changed their name after the 2004 season). In 115 games, he batted .207 with 13 home runs.

Miller played for the Single-A Jupiter Hammerheads in 2006. He batted .208, but his home run production dropped, producing no home runs for the Hammerheads in 2006.

In 2007, Miller moved up a level, playing for the Double-A Carolina Mudcats. For the Mudcats, he set career highs in batting average (.261), home runs (14), RBI (58), games played (129), hits (106), and doubles (26).

Miller made his major league debut with Florida in 2008, and went 0-for-1 in the game, his only appearance on the year with the Marlins.

On November 20, 2009, the Marlins purchased his contract, protecting him from the Rule 5 draft. He was later designated for assignment by the team on April 3, 2010.

=== Oakland Athletics ===
On April 8, 2010, Miller was claimed off waivers by the Oakland Athletics. In 10 appearances for the Triple-A Sacramento River Cats, he went 4-for-34 (.118) with one RBI and three stolen bases. Miller was designated for assignment by Oakland on April 22.

=== Kansas City Royals ===
On April 26, 2010, Miller was claimed off waivers by the Kansas City Royals. On August 23, he got his first major league hit, a single off of Eddie Bonine of the Detroit Tigers. In 20 appearances for Kansas City, Miller batted .236/.300/.345 with one home run, four RBI, and one stolen base. On November 5, Miller was removed from the 40-man roster and sent outright to the Triple-A Omaha Storm Chasers. He elected free agency the following day.

=== Oakland Athletics (second stint) ===
On November 17, 2010, Miller signed a minor league contract with the Oakland Athletics organization. He spent nearly the entire 2011 season with Triple-A Sacramento River Cats, batting .276 with 32 homers and 88 RBI in 110 games. On September 11, 2011, the Athletics selected Miller's contract, adding him to their active roster. He played in seven games for Oakland, going 3-for-12 (.250) with one home run and two RBI. On December 23, Miller was designated for assignment to clear roster space for the prospects acquired in the Gio González trade.

=== Baltimore Orioles ===
On January 3, 2012, Miller was traded to the Baltimore Orioles in exchange for cash considerations. On April 3, Miller was removed from the 40-man roster and sent outright to the Triple-A Norfolk Tides. In 97 appearances split between Norfolk and the Double-A Bowie Baysox, he batted a combined .196/.299/.365 with 12 home runs, 38 RBI, and five stolen bases. Miller elected free agency on October 6.

== Football career ==
Jai Miller
Profile
- Position: Safety

Personal information
- Born: January 17, 1985 (age 41); Selma, Alabama, U.S.
- Listed height: 6 ft 3 in (1.91 m)
- Listed weight: 200 lb (91 kg)

Career information
- High school: Selma High School (Selma, Alabama)
- College: Alabama (2013–2014)

On January 7, 2013, Miller announced his intention to play football with the University of Alabama.
