= Ryan Tucker (baseball) =

American baseball player (born 1986)

- Pitcher
- Born: December 6, 1986 (age 39); Burbank, California, U.S.
- Batted: Right Threw: Right

MLB debut
- June 8, 2008, for the Florida Marlins

Last MLB appearance
- May 9, 2011, for the Texas Rangers

MLB statistics
- Win–loss record: 2–3
- Earned run average: 8.14
- Strikeouts: 32
- Stats at Baseball Reference

Teams
- Florida Marlins (2008); Texas Rangers (2011)

Ryan C. Tucker (born December 6, 1986) is an American former professional baseball pitcher. He played in Major League Baseball (MLB) for the Florida Marlins and Texas Rangers.

== Career ==
=== Florida Marlins ===
Tucker graduated from Temple City High School, where he was a High School All-American, and was selected by the Florida Marlins with the 34th pick of the 2005 Major League Baseball draft. After spending his first three seasons in the low minors, he began 2008 with the Double-A Carolina Mudcats in the Southern League. He was in 25 games for the Mudcats, including 12 starts, and was 5–3 with a 1.58 ERA and was named the Marlins "minor league pitcher of the year" and also made the Southern League all-star team.

Tucker made his major league debut on June 8, 2008, for the Marlins against the Cincinnati Reds, allowing one run in five innings to pick up the win. In 6 appearances (3 starts) in 2008, he was 2–3 with an 8.27 ERA. He missed most of 2009 with injuries, including a knee surgery to repair a torn quad, and appeared in only 6 minor league games. He returned in 2010 to start for the Triple-A New Orleans Zephyrs and Single-A Jupiter Hammerheads, where he was 1–3 with a 6.00 ERA in 23 relief appearances.

=== Texas Rangers ===
On October 6, 2010, Tucker was claimed off waivers by the Texas Rangers. He had his contract purchased by Texas on April 27, 2011. He appeared in five games for the Rangers in 2011, working five innings of relief, with a 7.20 ERA. On August 30 he was released.

=== Los Angeles Dodgers ===
On November 16, 2011, Tucker was signed to a minor league contract that included a spring training invite, by the Los Angeles Dodgers. He was subsequently assigned to the Triple-A Albuquerque Isotopes.

Tucker pitched in only 4 games for the Isotopes and spent much of the time on the disabled list, before having shoulder surgery to repair a torn labrum on June 5, 2012. He was released on July 6. Tucker had a subsequent surgery on October 8, 2013, to repair a right shoulder SLAP tear with subacromial bursitis.

== Post-baseball career ==
After retiring from baseball, Tucker opened a cannabis dispensary in Cathedral City, California.
