= Jurupa Valley High School =

Public high school in Jurapa Valley, California, United States

Coordinates: 34°00′07″N 117°31′16″W

- 10551 Bellegrave Ave; Jurupa Valley; California 91752; United States

Information
- Type: Public
- Established: 1989
- Principal: Shelley Morris
- Staff: 71.19 (FTE)
- Grades: 9 - 12
- Enrollment: 1,638 (2023-2024)
- Student to teacher ratio: 23.01
- Colors: Navy Blue; Silver; White
- Athletics conference: River Valley League
- Mascot: Jaguar
- Website: Jurupa Valley HS

Jurupa Valley Valley High School is a public high school in Jurupa Valley, California. The school was established in 1989, as part of the Jurupa Unified School District, and the first class graduated in 1992. Located near the junction of the Ontario (I-15) and Pomona (State Route 60) freeways, it is one of four high schools in the district, the others being Rubidoux High School, Patriot High School, and Nueva Vista High School, a continuation school.

== Notable alumni ==
- Rafael Martin – baseball player
- Brian Stokes – baseball player
- Raymond McNeil – football player
