= Patriot High School (California) =

Location
- 4355 Camino Real Ave; Jurupa Valley; California; United States; 34°00′08″N 117°31′19″W

Information
- Type: Public
- Established: 2007
- School district: Jurupa Unified School District
- Principal: Naomi Brush
- Teaching staff: 109.28 (FTE)
- Grades: 9-12
- Enrollment: 2,482 (2023-2024)
- Student to teacher ratio: 22.72
- Colors: Silver; Black; Cardinal Red
- Athletics conference: River Valley League
- Mascot: Warrior
- Website: jurupausd.org/phs

Patriot High School is a high school in Jurupa Valley, California, and is part of the Jurupa Unified School District. It accommodates students of the 9th to 12th grades. It is one of four high schools in the Jurupa Unified School District along with Jurupa Valley High School, Rubidoux High School and Nueva Vista.
