= Miguel Cabrera =

Venezuelan baseball player (born 1983)

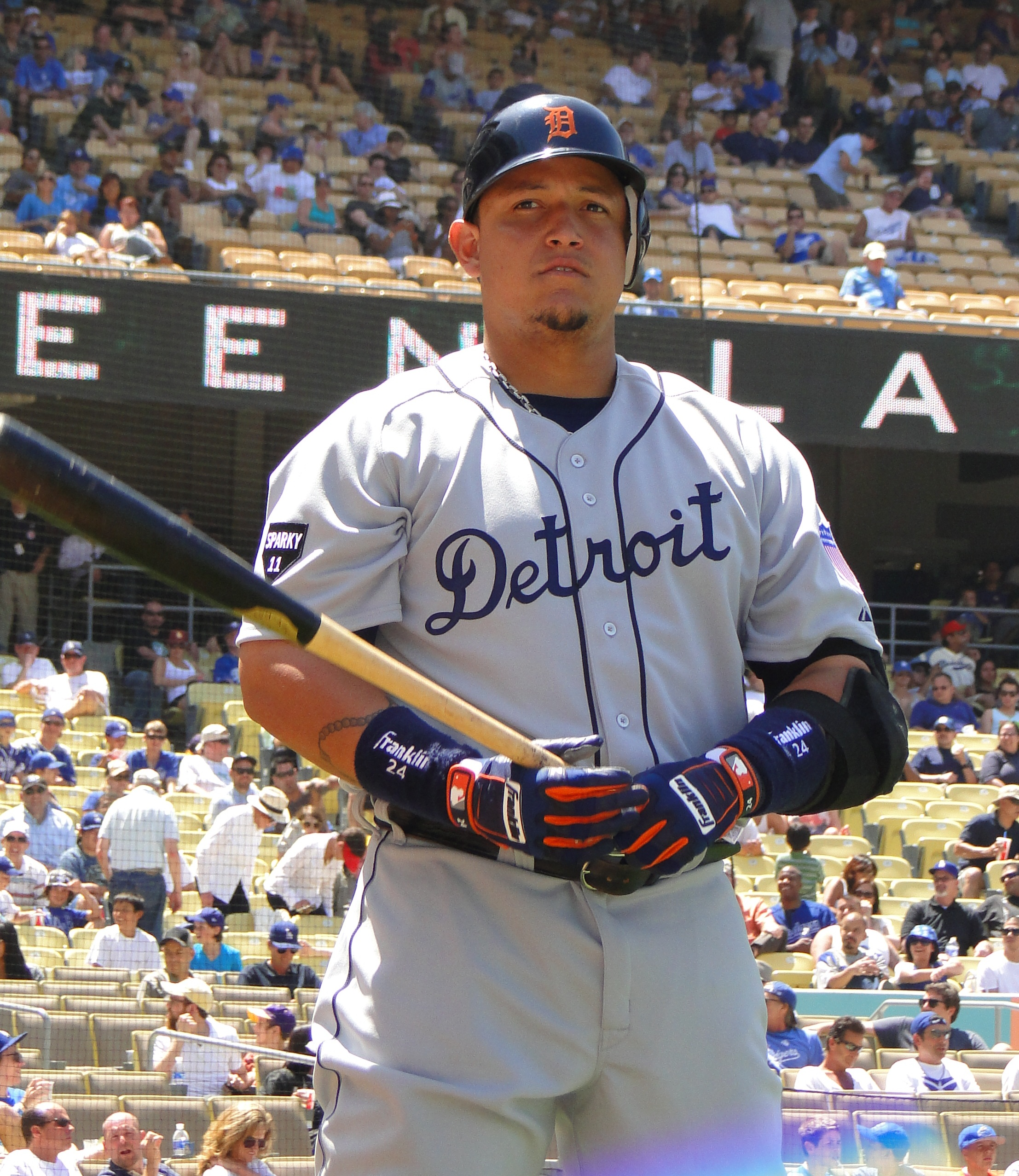
- Cabrera with the Detroit Tigers in 2011
- First baseman / Third baseman / Designated hitter
- Born: April 18, 1983 (age 43); Maracay, Venezuela
- Batted: Right Threw: Right

MLB debut
- June 20, 2003, for the Florida Marlins

Last MLB appearance
- October 1, 2023, for the Detroit Tigers

MLB statistics
- Batting average: .306
- Hits: 3,174
- Home runs: 511
- Runs batted in: 1,881
- Stats at Baseball Reference

Teams
- Florida Marlins (2003–2007); Detroit Tigers (2008–2023)

Career highlights and awards
- 12× All-Star (2004–2007, 2010–2016, 2022); World Series champion (2003); 2× AL MVP (2012, 2013); AL Triple Crown (2012); 7× Silver Slugger Award (2005, 2006, 2010, 2012, 2013, 2015, 2016); 2× AL Hank Aaron Award (2012, 2013); 4× AL batting champion (2011–2013, 2015); 2× AL home run leader (2008, 2012); 2× AL RBI leader (2010, 2012)

José Miguel Cabrera Torres (born April 18, 1983), nicknamed "Miggy", is a Venezuelan former professional baseball first baseman, third baseman, and designated hitter who played 21 seasons in Major League Baseball (MLB) for the Florida Marlins and Detroit Tigers. Debuting in 2003, he was a two-time American League (AL) Most Valuable Player (MVP) award winner, a four-time AL batting champion, and a 12-time MLB All-Star. Although he primarily played in left and right field before 2006, he spent the majority of his major league career at first and third base. He claimed the 17th MLB Triple Crown in 2012, the first to do so in 45 seasons, and remains the only player since 1968. Cabrera is one of three players in MLB history to have a career batting average above .300, 500 home runs, and 3,000 hits, joining Hank Aaron and Willie Mays. Cabrera is regarded as one of the greatest hitters of all time.

At 16 years old, Cabrera was signed by Tigres de Aragua of the Venezuelan Winter League, where he recorded his first hit as a professional in December 1999. Cabrera was signed in 1999 as an amateur free agent by the Florida Marlins, and progressed through their minor league system. He made his MLB debut in mid-2003 at the age of 20, and contributed to the Marlins' 2003 World Series victory later that year over the New York Yankees. Over the next four seasons, Cabrera was a regular player for the Marlins before being traded to the Detroit Tigers ahead of the 2008 season.

In 2012, Cabrera became the first player since Carl Yastrzemski in 1967 to win the batting Triple Crown, leading the AL with a .330 batting average, 44 home runs, and 139 runs batted in (RBI), earning him the AL MVP award that year. In the first half of 2013, Cabrera was on pace to shatter his numbers from his prior Triple Crown season. He became the first player to ever reach 30 home runs and 90 RBIs before the all-star break and was on pace to bat .366 with 53 home runs and 167 RBIs at that time. However, injuries plagued much of the latter half of the season and both his performance and playing time were reduced as a result. Overall, Cabrera still improved on his previous year's batting performance, including a career-high .348 batting average, and received his second consecutive AL MVP award.

Cabrera won four AL batting titles, including three in consecutive years (2011–2013), and batted over .300 in 11 different seasons. He hit 30 or more home runs in ten separate seasons and drove in over 100 runs in 12 separate seasons (including 11 consecutive seasons, 2004–2014). Cabrera is the all-time leader in career home runs and hits by a Venezuelan player, surpassing Andrés Galarraga and Omar Vizquel, respectively. He joined the 500 home run club in 2021 and the 3,000 hit club in 2022; he was the seventh player in MLB history to reach both milestones. In international competition, he represented Venezuela at five World Baseball Classic tournaments from 2006 to 2023. Cabrera retired after the 2023 season and continues to work for the Tigers' organization as a special assistant to the president of baseball operations. At the 2026 World Baseball Classic, Cabrera was the hitting coach for Venezuela. Venezuela went on to win its first World Baseball Classic championship.

== Early life ==
Cabrera was born in Maracay, Aragua State, Venezuela, to parents Miguel Cabrera and Gregoria Torres de Cabrera. Growing up, Cabrera showed interest in volleyball as well as baseball. From early on, he was guided by his maternal uncle, David Torres. At 14, he was enrolled in a baseball school in Cagua, so he could continue his studies while still playing ball.

== Professional career ==
=== Minor leagues ===
Miguel was signed by the Marlins in 1999 as an amateur free agent and came up through their farm system, teaming with future major leaguers Adrián González and Dontrelle Willis.

He began his professional career in 2000 as a shortstop in the Gulf Coast League (GCL). After batting .260 with 10 doubles, two triples, and two home runs through 57 games for the GCL Marlins, Cabrera was promoted to Class-A ball where he finished the final eight games batting .250 with 6 RBIs for the New York–Penn League (NYPL) Blue Sox in Utica, New York. While playing that winter for the Tigres de Aragua in the Venezuelan Winter League, manager Bill Plummer moved Cabrera from shortstop to third base.

Heading into 2001, the Marlins bumped Cabrera up to the Low Class-A Kane County Cougars. He earned his way into the Futures Game during All-Star Weekend in Seattle, along with González. He ended the year batting .268 with 30 extra-base hits, 66 RBIs, and distinguished himself as having the strongest arm in the Midwest League.

Entering the following season, Cabrera was once again promoted, this time to the Jupiter Hammerheads of the High Class-A Florida State League. At the request of the Marlins coach Ozzie Guillén, Cabrera made the transition from shortstop to third base. By July, his average was at .277, and he led his team with 45 RBI earning himself a second trip to the Future's game, where he collected two singles. He finished the season batting .278 with 43 doubles and 75 RBIs. Up to this point, he hit just nine homers in his 489 at-bats.

To begin the 2003 season, Cabrera earned another promotion to the Double-A Carolina Mudcats. There he again teamed up with Willis, the left-handed fireballer with whom he would join in the majors. In April, he hit .402, and by June his average stood at .365 with 10 homers and 59 RBIs before being called up to the majors.

=== Florida Marlins (2003–2007) ===
==== 2003: Rookie year and World Series ====
Cabrera made his major league debut on June 20, 2003, at 20 years old. Cabrera hit a walk-off home run in his first major league game against the Tampa Bay Devil Rays, following Billy Parker in 1972 and Josh Bard in 2002 as the third player since 1900 to hit a game-winning home run in his big-league debut. Cabrera rapidly established himself, as his stellar play in July made him the Marlins' cleanup hitter. Cabrera's postseason play helped propel Florida to the World Series title over the New York Yankees and landed him on the cover of ESPN The Magazine during the offseason. He finished fifth in the NL Rookie of the Year voting, as teammate Dontrelle Willis took home the award.

In the NLDS against the Giants, Cabrera hit .286 with three RBIs. After changing positions in the heat of the NLCS against the Chicago Cubs, he hit .333 with three homers and six RBIs, including clutch home runs in Game 1 and Game 7 that gave the Marlins crucial leads. In Game 4 of the 2003 World Series against the Yankees, Cabrera faced Roger Clemens for the first time in his career. In the first inning, Clemens threw a 92-mph fastball in the vicinity of Cabrera's chin, causing Cabrera to turn and stare at Clemens. Later in the at-bat, Cabrera hit a pitch to deep right field for a two-run home run. The home run would give the Marlins an early 2–0 lead en route to a 4–3 Marlins victory that evened the series at two games apiece. Cabrera and the Marlins would go on to win the 2003 World Series in 6 games.

In his first season, Cabrera batted .268 (84-for-314), with 12 home runs, 62 RBIs, 39 runs, 21 doubles, and three triples in 87 games played and received NL Rookie of the Month honors for both July and September.

==== 2004: 1st All-Star Game ====
On April 20, 2004, Cabrera recorded his 100th career hit, an RBI single in the seventh inning against Roberto Hernández. In 2004, Cabrera batted .294 with 33 home runs, 112 RBIs, 101 runs, 177 hits, a .366 on-base percentage, and a .512 slugging percentage from the third and fourth spots in the order, while playing in 160 games and earning his first All-Star appearance. Cabrera spent the entire 2004 season playing in the outfield and had 13 outfield assists. In 284 total fielding chances, he committed nine errors (tied for the most among NL outfielders) and made 262 putouts. Cabrera also appeared in his first career all-star game, as a reserve. Cabrera hit an RBI scoring forceout in the 8th inning to drive in Moisés Alou.

==== 2005 ====
In 2005, Cabrera finished second in the National League in hits with 198 and batted .323 with 33 home runs, 43 doubles, two triples, and 116 RBIs. He was voted to his second consecutive All-Star Game, along with teammates Paul Lo Duca and Willis, and won his first Silver Slugger Award. Cabrera's 33 home runs made him the youngest player in Major League Baseball history with back-to-back 30-homer seasons, at 22 years, 143 days. Albert Pujols performed the feat at 22 years, 223 days. Cabrera ultimately would have four seasons with at least 100 runs batted in, which is the most among Marlin players in history, and he is the only one to have had consecutive 100-RBI seasons.

==== 2006 ====
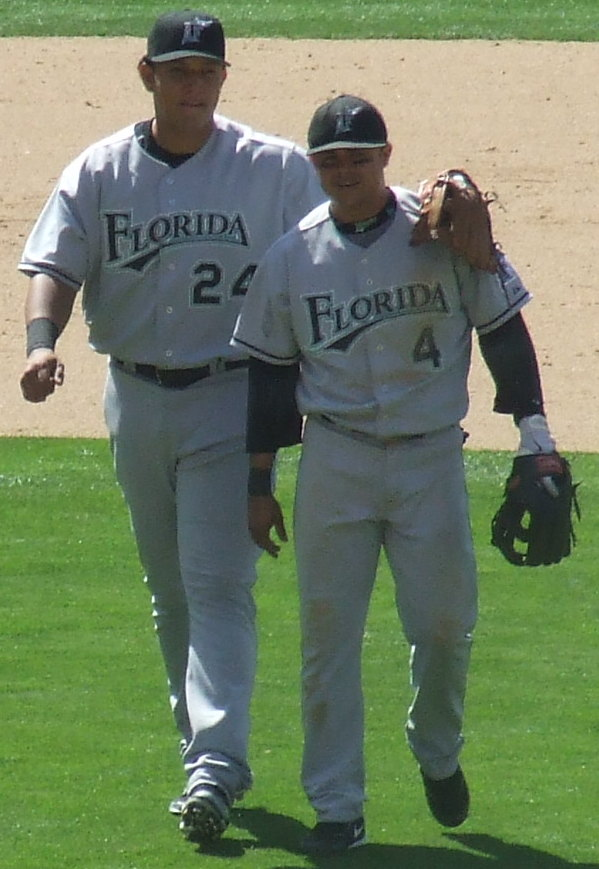
Cabrera (left) with Marlins teammate Alfredo Amézaga during a June 2006 game at Petco Park

On June 22, 2006, pitcher Todd Williams let the first pitch of an attempted intentional walk get too close to the plate and Cabrera reached out and singled it to right center field. The hit occurred during the 10th inning, scoring the winning run to give the Marlins a 6–5 lead over the Baltimore Orioles.

During a July 9, 7–6 road loss to the New York Mets, Cabrera became involved in an altercation with teammate Scott Olsen. With the Marlins trailing 2–0, Mets catcher Paul Lo Duca hit a hard grounder that glanced off Cabrera's glove and rolled into left field, allowing a run to score as Lo Duca raced to second with a double. As they came off the field, Olsen could be seen shouting something at Cabrera. A moment later, television cameras showed Cabrera in the crowded dugout reaching past teammates to poke his finger at Olsen as the pitcher walked past him. Olsen tried to jab back at Cabrera, who charged Olsen and tried to kick the pitcher before the players were quickly separated by teammates. Cabrera was voted to represent the National League All-Stars for the third time in his career and made his first appearance in the Home Run Derby. Cabrera finished in third place with 15 home runs in the event.

With teammates Josh Willingham and Dan Uggla hitting behind and ahead of him respectively, Cabrera finished the year with a .339 batting average, 26 home runs, and 114 RBIs. He was selected for his third consecutive All-Star Game and won his second Silver Slugger Award. Cabrera battled the Pittsburgh Pirates' shortstop Freddy Sanchez for the National League batting crown until the last day of the regular season. Marlins manager Joe Girardi decided to bat Cabrera leadoff for the final game of the season to give him more chances to get a hit for the crown. He ended up finishing second to Sanchez. Cabrera also finished the 2006 campaign with a .568 slugging percentage and a .430 on-base percentage.

==== 2007 ====
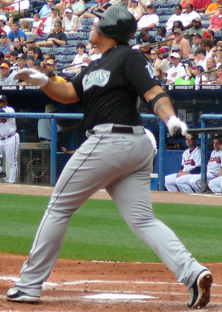
Cabrera with the Florida Marlins in 2007

On February 17, Cabrera became the first player of the 2007 offseason to win his arbitration hearing, obtaining a one-year contract worth $7.4 million.

Cabrera made his fourth consecutive All-Star game. He was initially scheduled to participate in the Home Run Derby during the All-Star weekend, but an injured left shoulder suffered a few days before the All-Star break, forced him out of the derby and limited him in the All-Star game to a pinch-hit at-bat against Dan Haren in which he struck out.

On September 4, Cabrera recorded his 500th RBI in the major leagues, making him the third-youngest player to accumulate 500 RBIs. Hall of Famers Mel Ott and Ted Williams were the only players to precede him in this feat. On September 15, 2007, in a game against the Colorado Rockies at Coors Field, Cabrera drove in at least 100 runs for the fourth consecutive year. His 100th RBI came in the first inning against Ubaldo Jiménez. Five innings later, Cabrera added four more RBIs when he hit a ball 438 feet (134 m) into the center field trees for his first career grand slam. He joined David Ortiz, Alex Rodriguez, Albert Pujols, Mark Teixeira, Bobby Abreu, and Vladimir Guerrero as the only players to reach the 100-RBI plateau in each of the four previous seasons.

In 2007, Cabrera won the NL Player of the Week twice (April 1–8 and June 4–10). He also passed former Marlins Gary Sheffield and Derrek Lee for second on the franchise home run list. Cabrera moved into third in all-time franchise RBIs and first in batting average. Cabrera ended the 2007 season with career highs in both home runs (34) and runs batted in (119) while hitting for a .320 average.

=== Detroit Tigers (2008–2023) ===
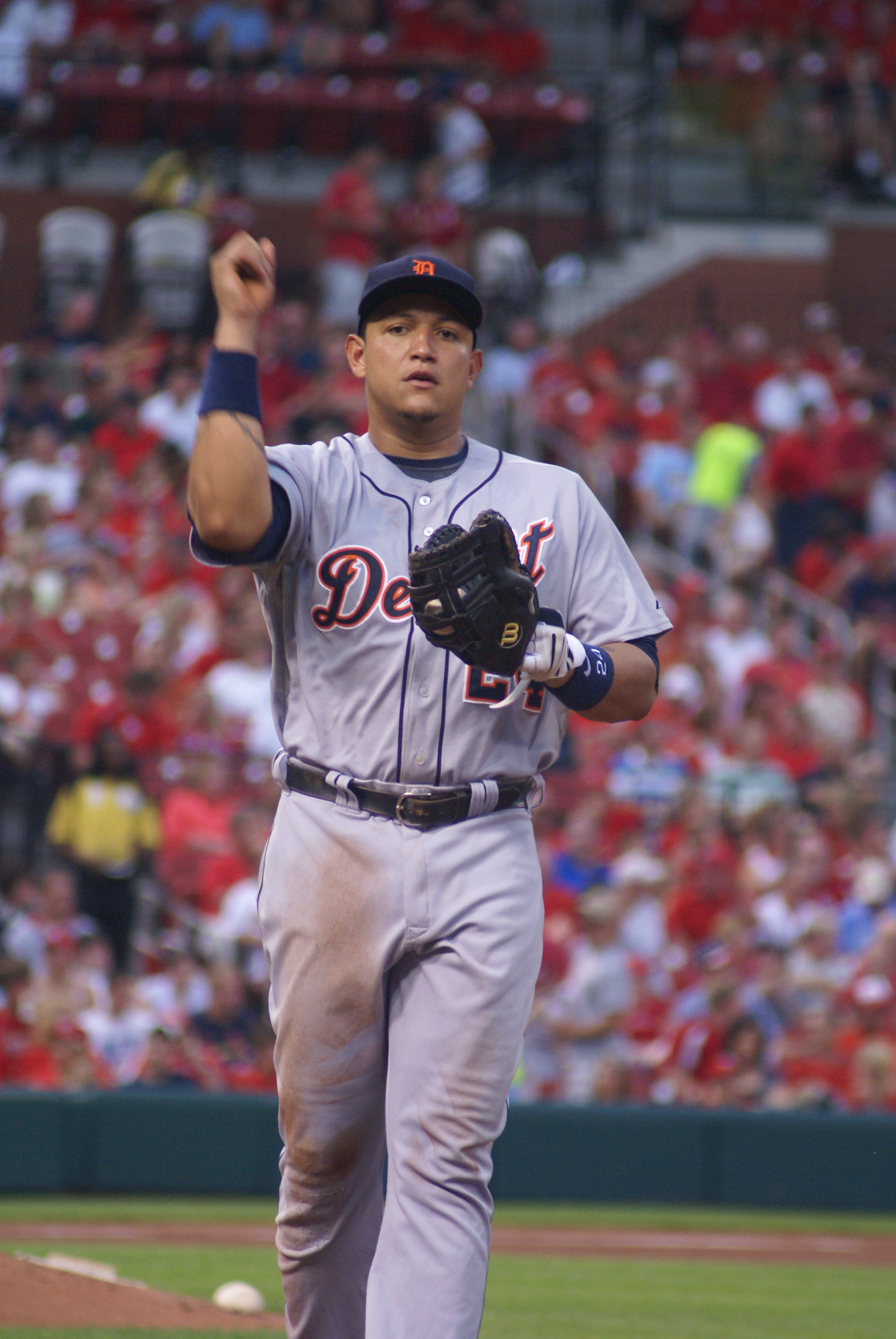
Cabrera in 2009

On December 5, 2007, the Marlins traded Cabrera and starting pitcher Dontrelle Willis to the Detroit Tigers for pitchers Andrew Miller, Dallas Trahern, Eulogio De La Cruz and Burke Badenhop, outfielder Cameron Maybin and catcher Mike Rabelo.

On March 22, 2008, Cabrera reached an agreement with the Tigers on an eight-year, $152.3 million contract extension. At the time, the deal was the fourth-largest in baseball history, behind those signed by Alex Rodriguez, Derek Jeter, and Manny Ramirez. The deal was also the largest in Tigers history at the time, surpassing the five-year, $75 million contract signed by Magglio Ordóñez in 2005 (it was later surpassed in 2012 when Prince Fielder signed a nine-year, $214 million deal) Cabrera earned $11.3 million in 2008 and was to receive an average of $20 million per year through 2015.

==== 2008 ====
Cabrera made his Tigers debut on March 31, 2008, playing third base in a home game against the Kansas City Royals. In his third at-bat, he hit a solo home run off Royals pitcher Gil Meche. He finished the game 1-for-5 with two strikeouts, and the Tigers lost 5–4 in 11 innings. On April 22, manager Jim Leyland announced that Cabrera would be moving to first base, with Carlos Guillén becoming the starting third baseman. Cabrera had already made seven appearances at first, the first appearances at the position of his career. Cabrera was named the AL Player of the Month for July after batting .330 with eight home runs and 31 RBIs. On September 7, Cabrera reached the 1,000-hit plateau on a home run off Twins pitcher Glen Perkins.

Cabrera finished the 2008 season with a career-high 37 home runs, which led the American League. He became the youngest AL home run champion since Troy Glaus in 2000. He also established a new career high in RBIs (127). He became one of only six players who had driven in at least 100 runs in each of the past five seasons, joining Alex Rodriguez, Albert Pujols, David Ortiz, Bobby Abreu, and Mark Teixeira.

==== 2009 ====
On Opening Day, Cabrera hit a grand slam to left-center that traveled more than 420 feet (130 m) at Comerica Park to help the Detroit Tigers to a 15–2 victory over the Texas Rangers. Cabrera finished the game 4-for-6 with six RBIs. On August 23, 2009, Cabrera hit his 200th career home run in a game against the Oakland A's. He became only the fourth Venezuelan player to ever reach that plateau.

Across the 2009 season, Cabrera posted a .324 batting average, which was fourth in the AL. He also tied his career-high in hits with 198, which was also fourth among AL players. Cabrera also had 103 RBI on the season, making it the sixth straight year he attained the 100 RBI mark.

==== 2010 ====
On May 28, in a game against the Oakland Athletics in Detroit, Cabrera hit three home runs in a 5–4 Tigers loss. Two of the home runs came against starter Ben Sheets, and one against closer Andrew Bailey. It was the first three-home run game in Cabrera's career and came in his first game returning to the team after his daughter's birth.

Cabrera was named an AL All-Star for the first time since joining the American League, and the fifth time in his eight-year career. He was chosen to be the starter in place of Minnesota Twins star Justin Morneau, who had suffered a concussion against the Tigers on July 9. Cabrera also participated in the Home Run Derby, finishing fourth in the event with 12 home runs.

On September 26, in a game against the Cleveland Indians, Cabrera suffered a high ankle sprain while getting back to first base on a pick-off attempt. He initially tried to play, but the Tigers decided to shut him down for the remainder of the season. Cabrera ended the 2010 season with a .328 batting average, a career-high 38 home runs, and 126 RBIs. The lack of a strong #5 hitter to follow Cabrera in the Tigers' lineup also resulted in him drawing a career-high 89 walks, which included an AL-leading 32 intentional passes. On defense, Cabrera led all AL first basemen in errors, with 13.

In the 2010 AL MVP voting, Cabrera finished second to Josh Hamilton of the Texas Rangers.

==== 2011: First career batting title ====
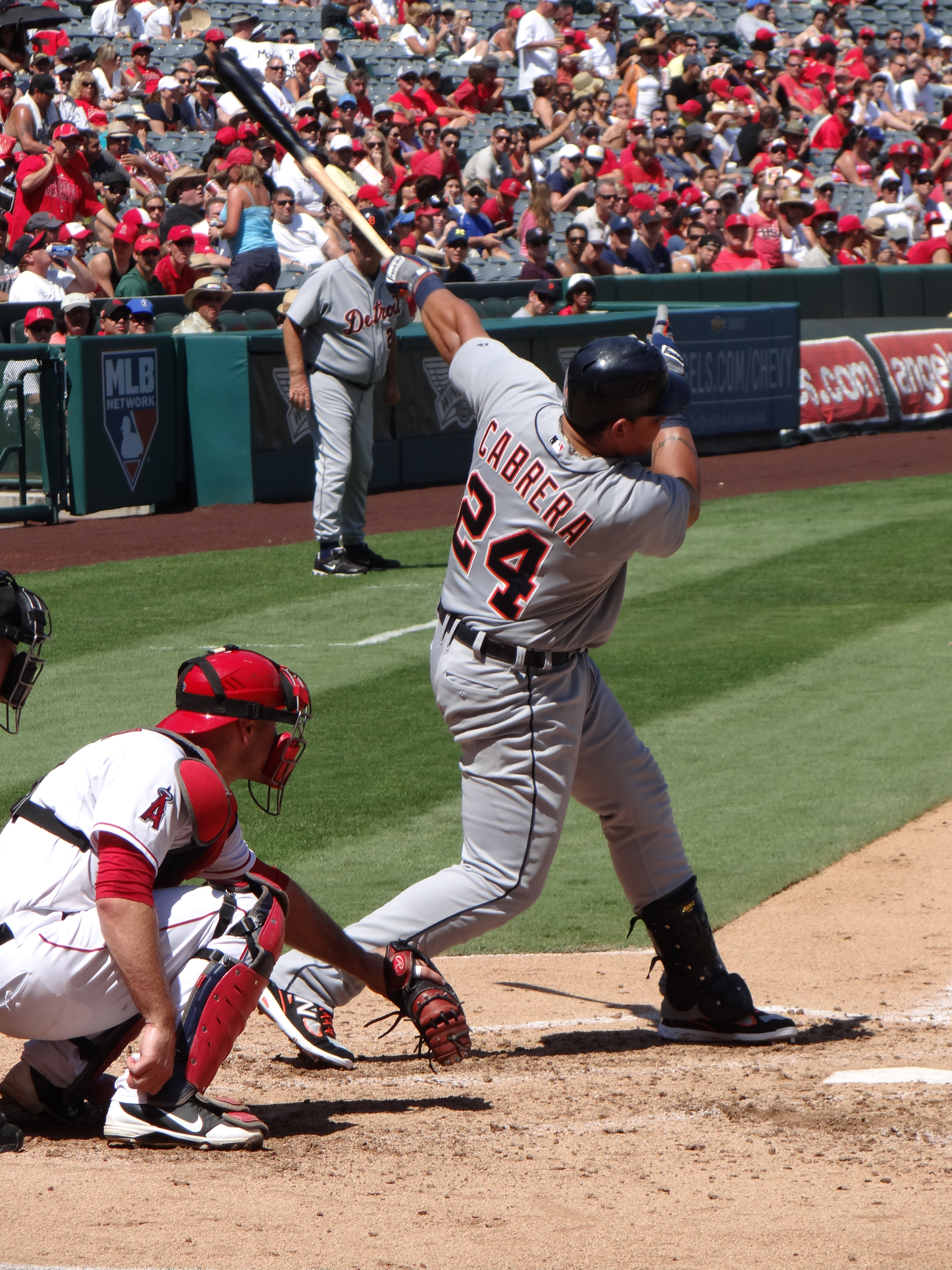
Cabrera batting against the Angels in 2012

Cabrera was named to his second AL All-Star team as a reserve in 2011, his sixth All-Star Game appearance overall. On July 15, the first game after the All-Star break, Cabrera collected his 1,500th career hit, in a game against the Chicago White Sox. During the 2011 season, Cabrera hit for a .344 average, winning the AL batting title, while also leading the AL in on-base percentage (.448) and doubles (48). He had his eighth straight 100-RBI season (105) and fifth straight 30-HR season (30). He also reached a new career-high in walks with 108. On defense, Cabrera led all AL first basemen in errors, with 13.

Cabrera hit .429 with six home runs and 21 RBIs in September 2011, propelling the Tigers into the playoffs and eventually the American League Championship Series. In the 2011 ALCS, Cabrera hit .400 with four doubles, three home runs, and seven RBI, and posted a 1.606 OPS, but the Tigers fell to the Texas Rangers in six games.

Through 2011, he had the sixth-best career batting average of all active players (.317), and seventh-best slugging percentage (.555) and OPS (.950).

==== 2012: Triple Crown, first MVP season, and World Series ====
In 2012, after the signing of first baseman Prince Fielder, the Tigers announced Cabrera would move back to third base. In a spring training game against the Philadelphia Phillies, Cabrera was struck below the right eye by a ground ball off the bat of Hunter Pence, which broke a bone. Despite this, after seeing the team's orbital surgeon, Dr. Srinivas Iyengar, Cabrera believed he would be ready for opening day on April 5. He was, and was in the starting lineup on Opening Day.

On April 7, Cabrera and new teammate Fielder each hit two home runs against the Red Sox, including back-to-back homers in the fifth inning. That week, from April 4–8, Cabrera was named AL Player of the Week, his ninth time achieving that honor, five of them being with Detroit. Cabrera hit 5-for-11 in three games over that span with three home runs and eight RBI. On April 27, Cabrera collected his 1,000th RBI in a game against the Yankees. He was the sixth youngest player to reach the mark, with only Mel Ott, Jimmie Foxx, Alex Rodriguez, Ken Griffey Jr., and Lou Gehrig being younger.

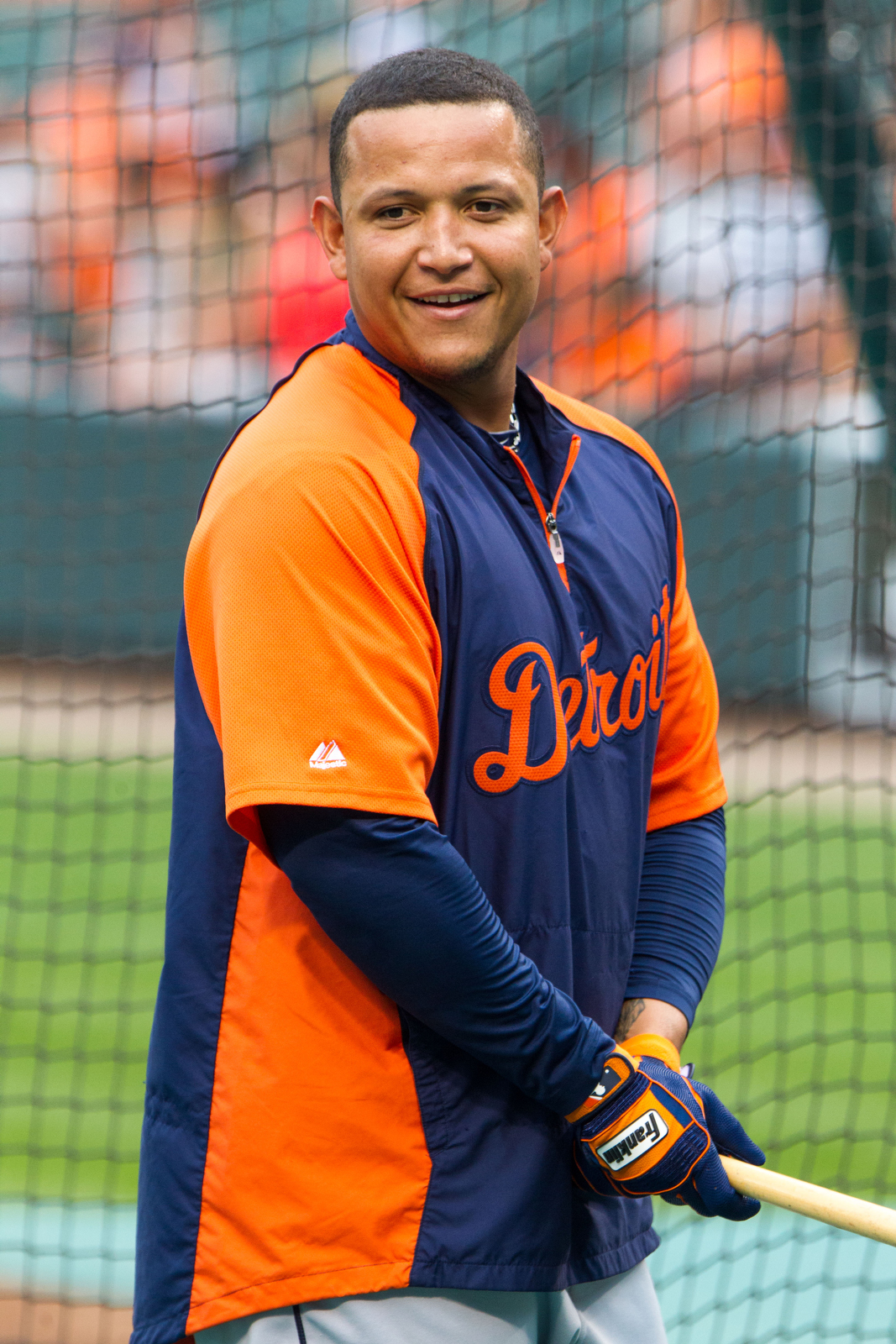
Cabrera during batting practice in 2012

Cabrera was named to the American League All-Star team as a reserve, as Rangers' third baseman Adrián Beltré was voted as the starter. This marked Cabrera's third consecutive All-Star appearance as a member of the Tigers and seventh appearance overall. On July 22, he hit his 300th career home run off White Sox starter Philip Humber. This made him the second Venezuelan-born player to reach this milestone, joining Andrés Galarraga who hit 399.

On August 15, Cabrera became the first player in Detroit Tigers history to hit 30 home runs in five consecutive seasons, passing Hank Greenberg (1937–40) and Cecil Fielder (1990–93), who each had four consecutive 30 home run seasons. This also marked the eighth time in the last nine seasons overall that Cabrera had reached the 30 home run mark. Cabrera was voted the American League Player of the Month for August after batting .357 with six doubles, eight home runs, 24 RBI, 19 runs scored, and 12 walks in 26 games. This was the second time that Cabrera was named player of the month for the Tigers as he joined Alan Trammell as the only Tigers to win the award more than once.

Cabrera won the Triple Crown, finishing the season with an AL-leading .330 batting average, and his 44 home runs and 139 RBIs led all of Major League Baseball. He became the first batter to win a Triple Crown since Carl Yastrzemski in 1967. Cabrera became the first non-outfielder to win the Triple Crown since Lou Gehrig in 1934, the first player to win it without a tie in any of the three categories since Frank Robinson in 1966, and the first Latin American player and the first third baseman to win a Triple Crown. Cabrera also had his first career 200-hit season, having hit safely 205 times. He was named The Sporting News Player of the Year. On October 27, 2012 he was awarded the AL Hank Aaron Award. Cabrera also led the AL in slugging (.606), OPS (.999), total bases (377), and led the majors in hitting into double plays (28).

In Game 4 of the 2012 World Series, Cabrera hit his first World Series home run since his rookie year with the Marlins in 2003, putting Detroit on the board for the first time in two games. During the bottom of the 10th inning, Cabrera was the final out of the World Series as he struck out looking, completing the San Francisco Giants' sweep of the Tigers.

On November 15, Cabrera was named the AL's Most Valuable Player over Mike Trout of the Los Angeles Angels, receiving 22 out of 28 first-place votes and 362 points from a panel of Baseball Writers' Association of America.

==== 2013: Second MVP season ====
Baseball Hall of Famer Al Kaline was quoted in 2013 as saying that Cabrera's performance was "unbelievable", and that Cabrera was "already qualified for Cooperstown." Bob Nightengale of USA Today Sports called Cabrera "the greatest player in the game of baseball." Barry Bonds agreed with Nightengale's analysis, adding "He's the best. By far. Without a doubt. The absolute best."

Cabrera continued a torrid pace into the 2013 season, being named American League Player of the Month for May. Cabrera batted .379 (44-for-116) with nine doubles, 12 home runs, 33 RBIs, 23 runs scored, and 15 walks in 28 games to claim his third career Player of the Month Award. Cabrera previously won top player honors in July 2008 and August 2012. The week of August 5–11, Cabrera was named the American League Co-Player of the Week, with fellow Tigers teammate Austin Jackson. Cabrera batted .429 (12-for-28) with two doubles, four home runs, 11 RBIs, and seven runs scored over seven games, to win his 10th career player of the week award.

As of the 2013 All-Star break, Cabrera was hitting .365 with 30 home runs and a league-leading 95 RBIs, considerably ahead of the pace he set during his 2012 Triple Crown season at the same point. Cabrera became the first player in MLB history to have at least 30 home runs and 90 RBIs before the All-Star break. Cabrera was voted in as the starter at third base for the first time in the fan balloting for the 2013 Major League All-Star Game. Cabrera won the ESPY Award in 2013 for Best MLB Player. On July 9, 2013, he hit his 350th career home run, against the Chicago White Sox.

On August 18, Cabrera hit his 40th home run of the season in a game against the Kansas City Royals, joining Babe Ruth and Jimmie Foxx as the only MLB players in history to have at least 40 home runs, 120 RBIs and a batting average of .350 or higher through 116 games. Cabrera also became the third Tigers player in history to hit 40 or more home runs in consecutive seasons, joining Hank Greenberg (1937–38) and Cecil Fielder (1990–91). Cabrera was named the American League Player of the Month for August. Cabrera batted .356 (36-for-101) with five doubles, 11 home runs, 31 RBIs, 17 runs scored, and 13 walks in 27 games to claim his fourth career Player of the Month Award and his second of the 2013 season, after claiming the award for May.

Following the All-Star Break, Cabrera suffered injuries including a groin strain that limited his playing time later in the season. Cabrera finished the regular season with a .348 batting average, and won his third straight AL batting title. Cabrera became the first Tiger to win three consecutive batting titles since Ty Cobb (1917–1919), the first American Leaguer to win at least three straight since Wade Boggs (1985–88), and the first right-handed batter in either league to win three straight batting titles since Rogers Hornsby (1920–25). He also led the AL in on-base percentage (.442), slugging percentage (.636), OPS (1.078) and OPS+ (190). He finished second in the league in home runs (44), RBIs (137), and runs scored (103), and was third in walks (90).

On October 24, Cabrera was honored with his second consecutive Sporting News MLB Player of the Year Award. He was the fourth player in history to win this award in back-to-back seasons, joining Ted Williams (1941–42), Joe Morgan (1975–76), and Albert Pujols (2008–09).

On November 14, Cabrera won his second consecutive American League MVP Award, receiving 23 out of 30 first-place votes and 385 points. Cabrera became the first American League player to win back-to-back MVP awards since Frank Thomas of the Chicago White Sox (1993–1994). He was the third Tiger player to win the MVP award more than once, joining Hank Greenberg (1935, 1940) and Hal Newhouser (1944–45).

==== 2014: Contract extension ====
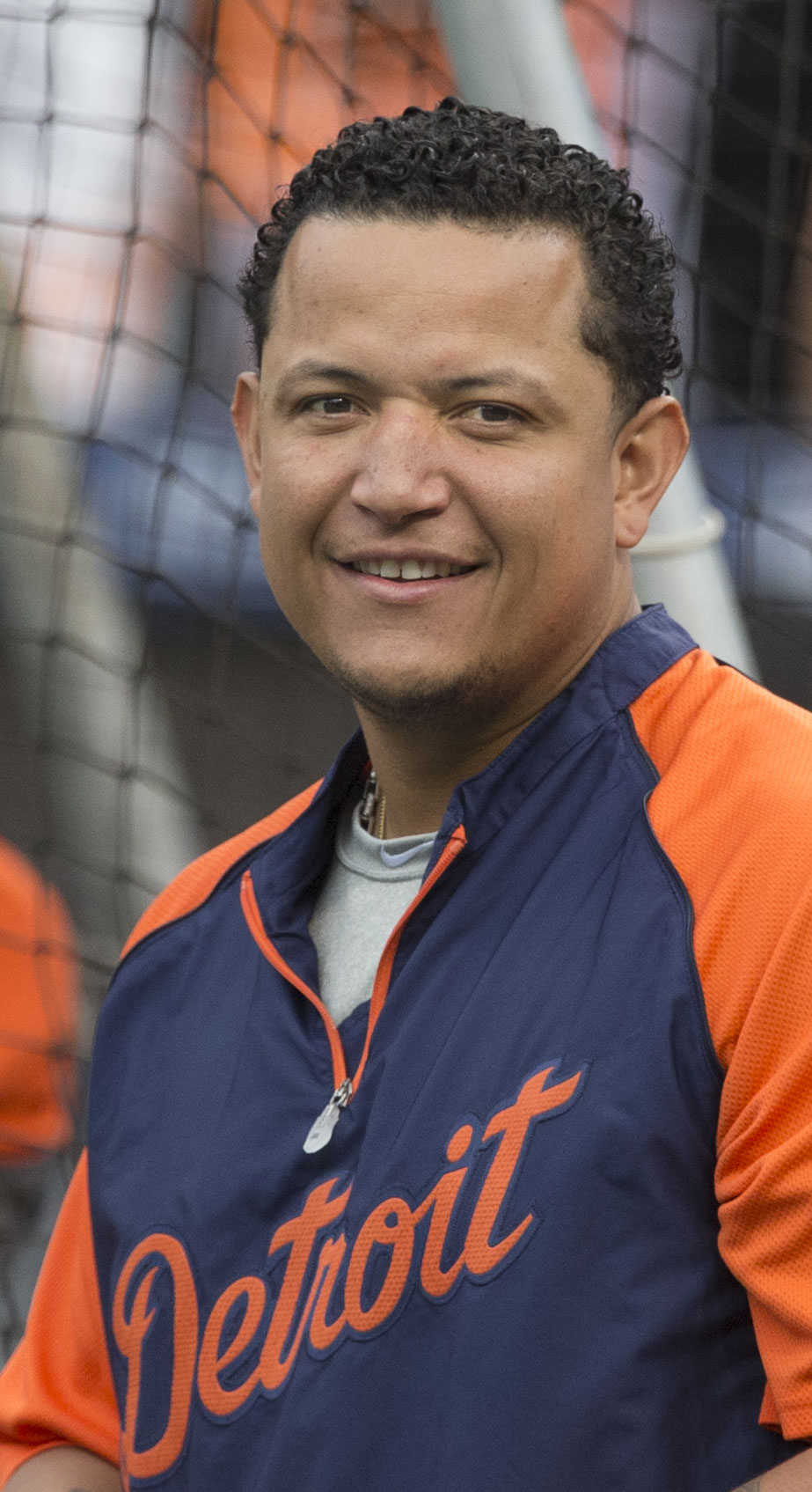
Cabrera during batting practice in 2014

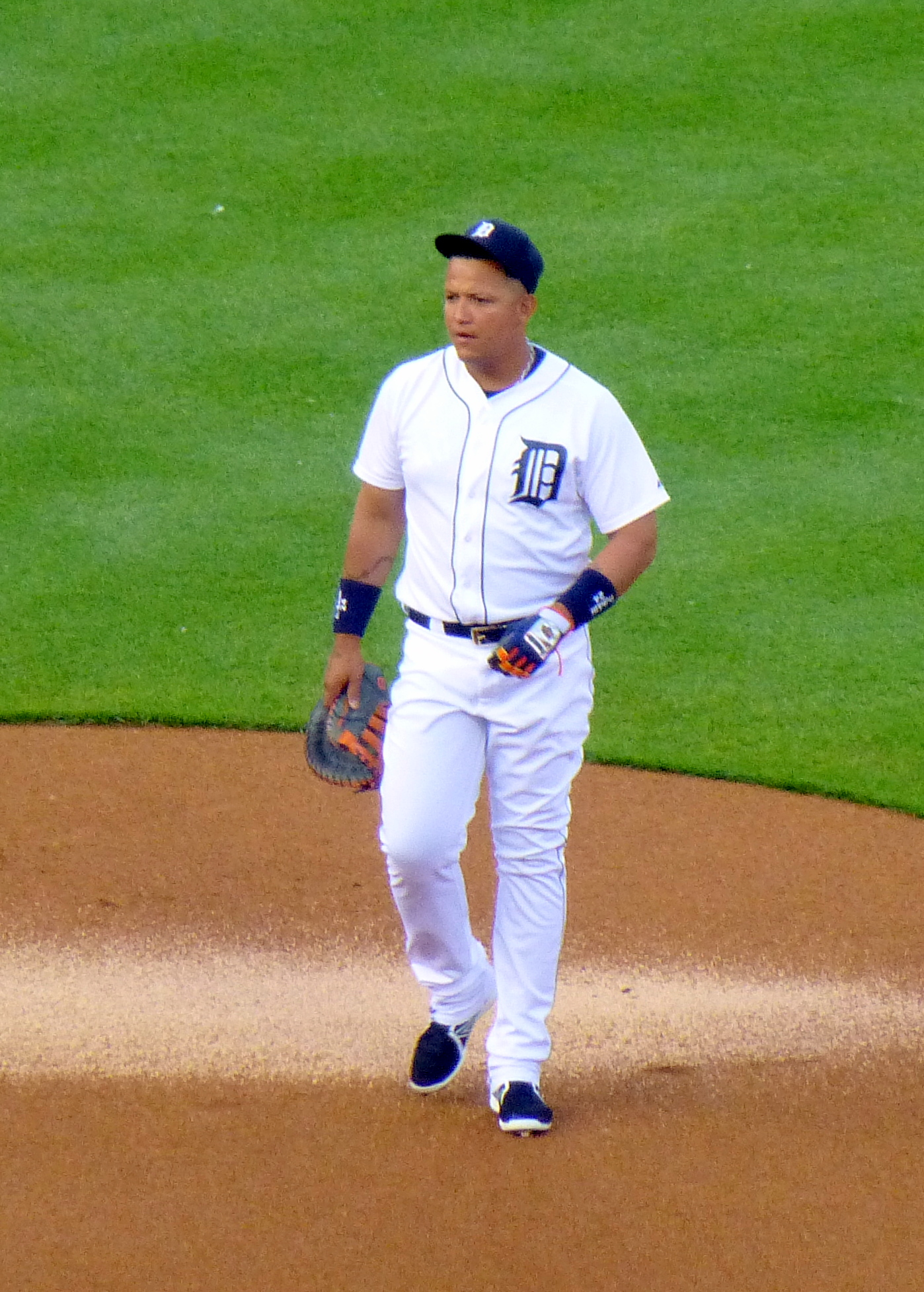
Cabrera in 2014

With the departure of Prince Fielder via trade, the Tigers announced that Cabrera would return to first base for the 2014 season.

On March 28, 2014, the Tigers announced that Cabrera had signed an eight-year contract extension worth $248 million. Combined with the $44 million the Tigers owed on the remaining two years of Miguel's then-current contract, the total 10-year commitment was worth $292 million. The deal broke the previous record commitment of $275 million the New York Yankees tendered to Alex Rodriguez in 2007. Cabrera's contract has since been surpassed by Giancarlo Stanton's 13-year, $325 million contract in 2014, the largest contract in baseball. Many analysts criticized the contract as excessive and short-sighted, with The Washington Post calling it "the worst."

On April 4, in a game against the Baltimore Orioles, Cabrera hit a two-run home run to notch his 2,000th career hit, becoming the ninth player to reach 2,000 hits before his 31st birthday and the seventh-youngest to reach the mark. On July 6, it was announced that Cabrera had won the fan voting to start at first base for the American League at the 2014 All-Star Game. This was his ninth All-Star selection overall, and second straight as a starter. In the first inning of the All-Star game, Cabrera hit a 2-run home run off National League starting pitcher Adam Wainwright. It was his first career All-Star game home run.

Cabrera won the ESPY Award for Best MLB Player for the second year in a row in 2014. On September 7, Cabrera recorded his 100th RBI of the season, reaching the milestone for the 11th consecutive season. Cabrera was the fifth player in major league history to accomplish this feat, joining Lou Gehrig (13 seasons), Jimmie Foxx (13 seasons), Alex Rodriguez (13 seasons), and Al Simmons (11 seasons).

Cabrera was named the AL Co-Player of the Week for the week of September 1–7. Cabrera batted .500 (15-for-30) with two doubles, five home runs, nine RBI, and eight runs scored in seven games to win his 11th career Player of the Week award. He led the major league in hits, home runs, total bases (32), slugging percentage (1.067), tied for first overall in runs scored, and tied for second in RBI.

Cabrera was named the American League Player of the Month for September. Cabrera batted .379 (39-for-103) with 10 doubles, eight home runs, 18 RBI, 39 hits, and 19 runs scored in 26 games to claim his fifth career Player of the Month Award and help the Tigers secure their fourth straight AL Central Division title by one game over the Kansas City Royals. Cabrera led the league with a .737 slugging percentage and a 1.118 OPS in September.

Cabrera finished the regular season with a .313 batting average, 25 home runs, 109 RBI, and a league-leading 52 doubles; he led both leagues with 11 sacrifice flies. Along with Matt Holliday in 2014, Cabrera attained at least 20 home runs, 30 doubles, 75 RBI, and 80 runs scored each for the ninth consecutive season, becoming the fourth player in MLB history to do so. The others were Stan Musial, Manny Ramirez, and Pujols, all with ten consecutive seasons.

On October 23, Cabrera was announced as a finalist for the American League Gold Glove Award for first base. This marked the first time he was nominated for the accolade. The other two nominees for the award were Albert Pujols and the defending Gold Glove winner Eric Hosmer, with Hosmer eventually winning the award for 2014 as well.

On October 24, Cabrera underwent surgery to remove a bone spur in his right ankle that had been bothering him for several months. He also had a procedure to repair a stress fracture in the navicular bone near the top of his right foot. Doctors knew about the bone spurs, but said the discovery of the broken bone was a surprise. Cabrera himself said he wasn't surprised, stating, "I was feeling a lot of pain. I knew something was wrong." He said he had to alter his swing mechanics during the last half of the 2014 season, being unable to put weight on his back foot without pain.

==== 2015: Fourth AL batting title ====
Cabrera was named the AL player of the week for the week of April 5–12. Cabrera batted .520 (13-for-25) with two doubles, two home runs, eight RBIs, and four runs scored over six Tigers victories to win his 13th career Player of the Week award. He led the league in total bases (21), hits (13), and on-base percentage (.586), was tied for first in RBIs, and was second in batting average and slugging percentage (.840). He finished the week by registering back-to-back four-hit games for the first time in his career.

On May 16, 2015, Cabrera hit his 400th career home run, against Tyler Lyons of the St. Louis Cardinals, making him the all-time leader in home runs among Venezuelan-born players, surpassing the previous record holder, Andrés Galarraga. At the age of 32 years, 28 days, he became the third-youngest active player to reach this milestone, behind Albert Pujols (30 years, 222 days) and Alex Rodriguez (29 years, 316 days), and the eighth-youngest in history. On May 21, Cabrera recorded his 1,400th career RBI. At the age of 32 years, 33 days, he was the fifth-youngest player to reach the milestone.

On July 4, Cabrera was placed on the 15-day disabled list with a Grade 3 left calf strain, including tearing of muscle fibers. This marked the first time Cabrera had been placed on the DL in his 13-year career. At the time of the injury, Cabrera was leading the league in batting average (.350), on-base percentage (.456), and OPS (1.034). He had 16 doubles, 15 home runs, and 54 RBIs through 77 games.

On July 5, it was announced that Cabrera had won the fan voting to start at first base for the American League at the 2015 All-Star Game; however, he was unable to play due to injury. This was the sixth consecutive season that Cabrera had been named an All-Star and the 10th time in his career. Cabrera was recalled from the disabled list on August 14. On August 16, he recorded his 1,426th career RBI to surpass Galarraga for the most RBIs by a Venezuelan-born player.

Although Cabrera had only 18 home runs and 76 RBI in 2015, snapping his streak of 11 consecutive seasons with at least 25 home runs and 100 RBIs, his .338 batting average led the major leagues and earned him his fourth AL batting title in the last five years. He was the seventh player in history to win at least four AL batting titles, following Ty Cobb, Harry Heilmann, Wade Boggs, Rod Carew, Ted Williams, and Nap Lajoie, and only the second right-handed batter in the live-ball era (since 1920) to do so, joining Heilmann. He also led the American League with a .440 on-base percentage, and ranked second in the league with a .974 OPS. He led all MLB hitters (140 or more plate appearances) in batting average against right-handers, at .344. Because of the injury-shortened season, Cabrera also saw his streak of 11 consecutive seasons with at least 300 total bases end. The streak ranks fourth in the MLB live-ball era, behind Lou Gehrig (13), Willie Mays (13) and Albert Pujols (12).

Cabrera won his sixth Silver Slugger award, and second at first base, becoming the 18th player to win at least six Silver Slugger Awards. Cabrera joined Alex Rodriguez as the only players with multiple Silver Slugger Awards at different infield positions.

==== 2016 ====
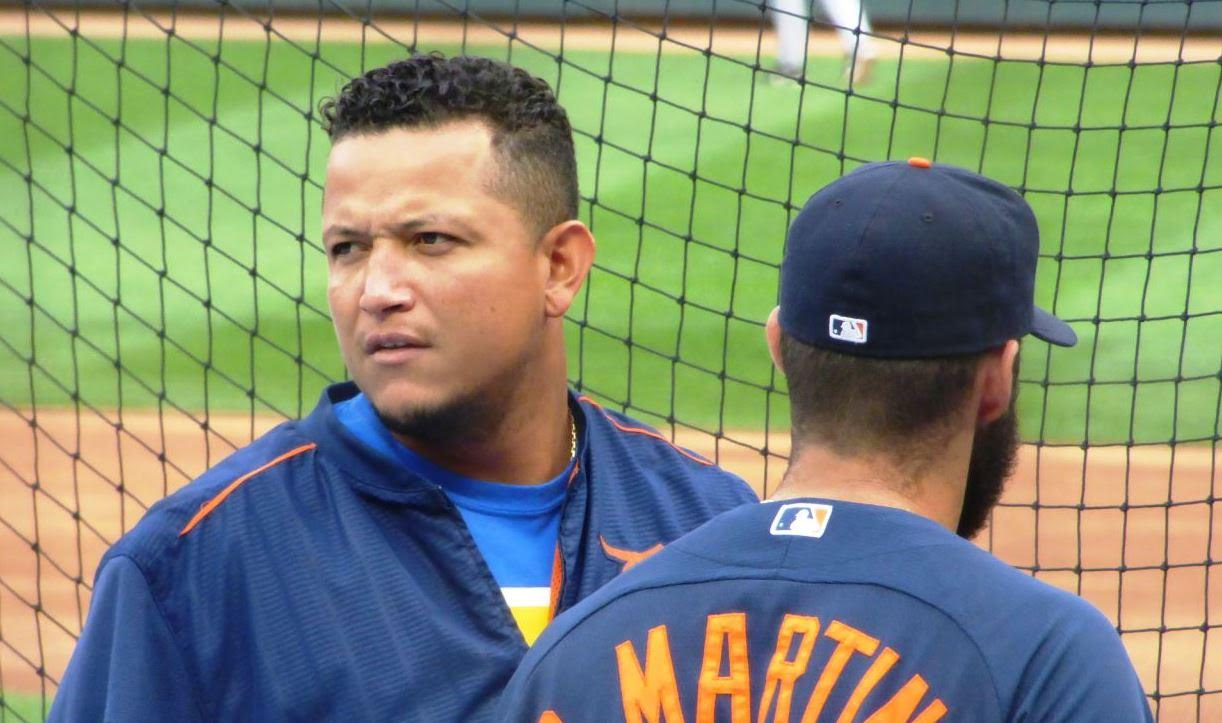
Cabrera during batting practice at Target Field in 2016

Cabrera was named the American League Co-Player of the Week, along with fellow Tigers teammate Cameron Maybin, for the week of May 16–22. Cabrera batted .500/.538/1.000 with three home runs and six RBIs during that time, to win his 14th career player of the week award. On May 23, Cabrera hit his 500th career double, becoming the 62nd player all time to reach the milestone. On June 12, Cabrera recorded his 2,400th career hit in his 2,000th career game, becoming the fifth-youngest player in MLB history to reach the milestone, at 33 years, 55 days old.

On June 28, Cabrera hit a home run off his former team, the Miami Marlins, giving him the distinction of hitting a home run against all 30 Major League teams during his career. On July 5, Cabrera was named to his 11th All-Star team, as a reserve at first base for the American League. On July 22, Cabrera recorded his 1,500th career RBI, becoming the 56th player in major league history to reach the milestone. Cabrera reached 1,500 RBI with 400+ home runs faster than anyone in Major League history. He was one of six active players with at least 400 home runs and 1,500 RBI, and was more than two years younger than any of the other five. On August 18, Cabrera recorded his 1,000th RBI as a member of the Tigers.

On September 5, Cabrera hit his 30th home run of the season and his 300th home run as a Tiger. He joined Al Kaline (399), Norm Cash (373), and Hank Greenberg (306) as the only four players to hit 300+ home runs in a Tiger uniform. On September 18, Cabrera recorded his 2,500th career hit, off the Indians' Trevor Bauer, becoming the 100th player in Major League history to reach the milestone, and the eighth player to do so by his age-33 season. He was the fourth-youngest (33 years, 181 days) to reach 2,500 hits, following Ty Cobb, Rogers Hornsby, and Hank Aaron.

Cabrera was named the American League Player of the Week for the week of September 26 – October 2. Cabrera batted .565 (13-for-23) with six runs scored, a double, four home runs, and 13 RBI over six games. Cabrera finished the period first in hits, RBI, batting average, slugging percentage (1.130), and on-base percentage (.583), second in home runs and total bases (26), and tied for third in runs scored in the American League. This marked Cabrera's 15th weekly honor, tying him with Barry Bonds for the second-most all-time. Cabrera was named the American League Player of the Month from September 1 to October 2. Cabrera batted .347 (34-for-98) with 20 runs scored, four doubles, 10 home runs, and 27 RBI over 26 games to claim his sixth career Player of the Month Award. Among American League leaders in September with a minimum of 80 at-bats, Cabrera finished second in slugging percentage (.694), tied for second in home runs, and RBI, third in on-base percentage (.443), fourth in batting average, and tied for fourth in hits and runs scored.

Cabrera finished the 2016 season with a .316 batting average, 38 home runs, 31 doubles, and 108 RBI. He finished tied for first in the AL with David Ortiz for the most intentional walks with 15, and for the second time in his career led the majors by hitting into 26 double plays.

Cabrera won the 2016 AL Silver Slugger Award for first basemen, his seventh Silver Slugger Award overall, and third award at first base. He was one of 14 Major League players to have won seven or more Silver Slugger awards since the award was introduced in 1980.

==== 2017 ====
Back ailments and stiffness plagued Cabrera throughout the 2017 season, beginning with the World Baseball Classic. On April 22, he was placed on the 10-day disabled list due to a right groin strain. He was activated on May 2 and hit his 450th career home run that night. On June 2, Cabrera recorded his 1,000th career extra-base hit, becoming the 39th player in Major League history to reach the milestone. On July 20, Cabrera recorded his 1,600th career RBI, becoming the 36th player in Major League history to reach the milestone. He left the August 12 game versus the Twins due to lower back stiffness, and missed the next two games.

On August 24, Cabrera got into an altercation with Yankees catcher, and future teammate, Austin Romine at home plate, triggering a bench-clearing brawl. Both players were ejected. On August 25, Cabrera was suspended seven games for his role in the brawl. He started serving his suspension on September 2 after it was reduced to six games on appeal.

On September 24, Cabrera was diagnosed with two herniated discs in his back, a condition that he likely played through the entire season. Manager Brad Ausmus and the Tigers did not think the issue would require offseason surgery. Cabrera finished 2017 with a career-low .249 batting average and a career-low .399 slugging percentage while hitting 16 home runs and driving in 60 runs in 130 games.

==== 2018 ====
On May 4, 2018, Cabrera was placed on the 10-day disabled list due to a right hamstring strain. On June 12, Cabrera suffered a left biceps injury after swinging and immediately left the game. He suffered a rupture in his left biceps tendon, requiring surgery and putting him out of action for the remainder of the 2018 season. He finished the 2018 season with a .299 batting average, three home runs, and 22 RBIs in 38 games.

==== 2019 ====
Cabrera struggled with knee issues in 2019, which had the Tigers moving him into a full-time designated hitter role by early June. He hit .282 for the year with 12 home runs and 59 RBI in 139 games. His .398 slugging percentage was the lowest of his career.

==== 2020: Shortened Season ====
On August 29, 2020, Cabrera collected three hits in a doubleheader against the Minnesota Twins passing former Tiger Charlie Gehringer for 50th on the all-time MLB hits list with 2,841. This made Cabrera one of only 16 major league players to place in the top 50 all-time for hits, home runs and RBIs. On August 30 against the Twins, Cabrera recorded his 2,000th career hit as a Tiger, becoming the eighth Tiger player to reach the milestone.

For the shortened 2020 season, Cabrera hit .250 (the second-lowest batting average of his career)/.329/.417 with a team-leading 10 home runs and 35 RBI in 57 games. Through season's end, he ranked 23rd all-time in doubles (581), 23rd in total bases (4,942), 24th in RBIs (1,729), 30th in home runs (487), and tied for 46th in hits (2,866). He had the slowest sprint speed of all major league DHs, at 23.2 feet per second.

==== 2021: 500th career home run ====
On April 1, 2021, with a home run in his first at-bat of the 2021 season, Cabrera became the second Tigers player to record 350 home runs and 2,000 hits with the team, following Al Kaline. On April 11, Cabrera was placed on the 10-day injured list with a left biceps strain. He was activated off the injured list and returned to game action on April 25. In a May 12 game against the Kansas City Royals, Cabrera surpassed Omar Vizquel for the most career hits by a Venezuelan-born player (2,878). On June 1, Cabrera recorded his 400th career double with the Tigers, becoming the eighth Tiger in franchise history to reach the milestone. Cabrera's 585th career double on June 15 moved him into the all-time MLB top 20 (tied with Rafael Palmeiro).

After posting a sub-.200 batting average through the first two months of the 2021 season, Cabrera batted .329 (28-for-85) in June. It was his first full month batting over .300 since June 2019.

On August 22, Cabrera hit his 500th career home run in the 6th inning off of Steven Matz of the Toronto Blue Jays, becoming the 28th player in Major League history to reach the milestone, and the first player to do so as a Tiger. Among members of the 500 home run club, Cabrera currently has the fifth highest career batting average, behind Ted Williams (.344), Babe Ruth (.342), Jimmie Foxx (.325) and Manny Ramirez (.312). Shortly after the August 22 game, the Tigers announced they would schedule a "Miggy Celebration Day" at Comerica Park for September 24. Despite playing his home games in two notoriously stingy home run stadiums (Joe Robbie Stadium in Miami and Comerica Park in Detroit), Cabrera's home/road splits for his first 500 home runs are nearly identical (248 at home, 252 on the road).

On September 7 against the Pittsburgh Pirates, Cabrera passed Ichiro Suzuki for the most career hits in MLB interleague play with 369. Cabrera had two more hits in that game, then went 4-for-4 against the Pirates the next night, increasing his interleague hit total to 375. Cabrera began the next Tigers game against the Tampa Bay Rays on September 10 with two more hits, giving him nine consecutive plate appearances with a hit. This marks the longest streak by a Tiger since Walt Dropo had hits in 12 straight plate appearances in 1952 (tying the MLB record), and the longest streak by any major league player age 38 or older since Ty Cobb in 1925.

On September 20, Cabrera recorded his 1,800th career RBI, becoming the 20th player in history to reach the milestone on the official MLB list. (Cabrera ranks 22nd on the Baseball Reference list, which recognizes RBI before it became an official statistic in 1920.)

With three hits and four RBIs against the Kansas City Royals on September 25, Cabrera tied Hank Aaron with his 81st career game of 3+ hits and 3+ RBI. Only Lou Gehrig (97), Al Simmons (94), and Babe Ruth (87) had more.

Cabrera finished the 2021 season with a .256 batting average, 15 home runs, and 75 RBIs while posting career lows in on-base percentage (.316), slugging percentage (.386), and OPS (.701). In 2021, he had the slowest sprint speed of all major league designated hitters, at 23.9 feet/second. At season's end, he was tied with Sam Rice for 33rd on the all-time MLB hits list with 2,987. He now ranked 28th in career home runs (502), 18th in career doubles (597), 21st in career extra-base hits (1,116), and 18th in career total bases (5,124).

==== 2022: 3,000th career hit ====
On April 23, 2022, Cabrera recorded his 3,000th career hit against Antonio Senzatela of the Colorado Rockies, an opposite-field single in the bottom of the first inning. He became the 33rd player in MLB history to join the 3,000-hit club, and the seventh player in MLB history to record 500 home runs and 3,000 hits, joining Hank Aaron, Willie Mays, Albert Pujols, Eddie Murray, Rafael Palmeiro, and Alex Rodriguez.

On May 7, Cabrera recorded his 600th career double, becoming the third player in MLB history to record 3,000 hits, 600 doubles, and 500 home runs, following Hank Aaron and Albert Pujols. He is also the first player in MLB history to record 3,000 hits, 600 doubles, 500 homers, and at least 1 Triple Crown. On June 28, Cabrera had two hits to move past Rickey Henderson into the Top 25 on the all-time MLB hits list (3,056). On July 8, Cabrera was named to the 2022 MLB All-Star Game as an honorary selection along with Albert Pujols by commissioner Rob Manfred, who was allowed to do so after the 2022 Collective Bargaining Agreement. In his only All-Star game plate appearance, Cabrera grounded out to shortstop. On July 25, Cabrera hit a solo home run for his 1,840th RBI, moving him into the Top 15 on the all-time list.

After being relegated to part-time duty in August, Cabrera was placed on the 10-day injured list on September 3 with a left biceps strain. He returned to the Tigers lineup on September 19. For the 2022 season, Cabrera hit .254 with 5 home runs and 43 RBI in 397 at-bats. At season's end, he ranks in the all-time top 25 in several hitting categories: hits (3,088; 24th), doubles (607; 14th), RBI (1,847; 14th), extra-base hits (1,131; 16th) and total bases (5,250; 16th). He also moved up to 27th all-time in home runs (507).

In November 2022, Cabrera announced that he would likely retire after the 2023 season, his final contracted year with the Tigers.

==== 2023: Final season ====
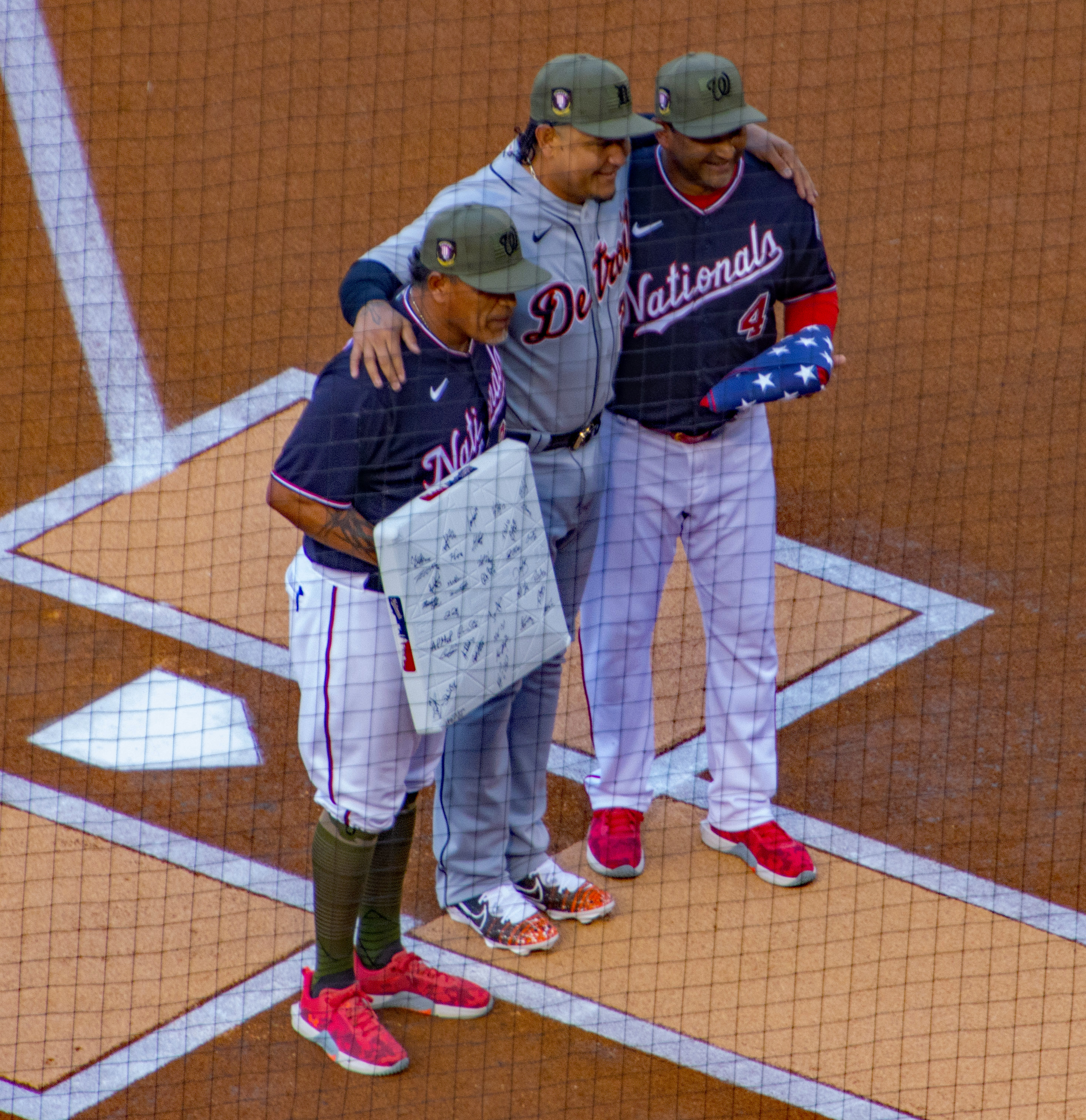
Cabrera receiving honors from the Nationals in May 2023

At spring training in February 2023, Cabrera confirmed that he planned to retire following the season. He stated he would like to remain with the Tigers organization, in a capacity where he could help younger players. On May 16, Cabrera became just the eighth player in Tigers history to play in 2,000 regular season games with the team, joining Sam Crawford, Ty Cobb, Charlie Gehringer, Al Kaline, Norm Cash, Lou Whitaker, and Alan Trammell.

On August 8 against the Minnesota Twins, Cabrera had two hits to surpass Tony Gwynn and move into the top 20 on the all-time MLB hits list. On September 27, Cabrera hit his 511th home run to move into the top 25 on the all-time MLB list (tied with Mel Ott). The homer also tied him with Norm Cash for the second-most home runs as a Tiger (373), behind only Al Kaline (399).

In his final major league inning, Cabrera was moved from his DH spot to first base and made an unassisted putout on a ground ball hit to him by the first batter of the inning. He was then removed from the game, making the putout the final statistic in his major league career. In his final season, Cabrera batted .257 with 20 doubles, 4 home runs, and 34 RBI in 98 games.

Cabrera finished his career with a .306 average, 3,174 hits (16th), 511 home runs (tied for 25th), 627 doubles (13th), 1,881 RBIs (12th), 1,258 walks, 1,551 runs, 103 sacrifice flies (tied for 25th), and a .900 OPS. He also ranked in the top 25 in MLB history with 11,796 plate appearances (23rd), 10,356 at-bats (22nd), 2,797 games (25th), 5,368 total bases (14th), 1,155 extra-base hits (14th), and 897 multi-hit games (17th). He retired as one of only two players in MLB history (with Hank Aaron) to reach 3,000 hits, 500 home runs, and 600 doubles while posting a career batting average over .300.

In 55 postseason games, Cabrera batted .278 (57-for-205) with 29 runs, 10 doubles, 13 home runs, 38 RBI, 27 walks, .368 on-base percentage and .517 slugging percentage.

== International career ==
Cabrera represented the Venezuela national baseball team in international competition. Before the 2006 MLB season, Cabrera represented Venezuela in the inaugural World Baseball Classic; the Venezuelan team finished seventh in the tournament.

Cabrera was selected to play for Venezuela at the 2009 World Baseball Classic, along with Tigers teammates Magglio Ordóñez, Carlos Guillén, and Armando Galarraga.

He also played at the 2013, 2017, and 2023 World Baseball Classic tournaments. In the 2026 World Baseball Classic, Cabrera served as the hitting coach for Venezuela, who went on to win its first ever World Baseball Classic championship. Later in 2026, Cabrera was inducted into the Venezuelan Baseball Hall of Fame as a member of the 2026 WBC championship team.

== Post-playing career ==
On September 29, 2023, two days before the end of the regular season, the Tigers announced Cabrera would remain a member of the organization as a special assistant to the president of baseball operations, Scott Harris.

In this role, he joins a group of other special assistants including Hall of Famer Alan Trammell and former Tigers manager Jim Leyland.

== Awards and highlights ==
Awards

- 2× AL Most Valuable Player (2012, 2013)
- 2× Baseball Digest Player of the Year (2012, 2013)
- 2× Florida Marlins Most Valuable Player (2004, 2006)
- 2× GIBBY/This Year in Baseball Award for Hitter of the Year (2012, 2013)
- 2× Hank Aaron Award (2012, 2013)
- 5× Luis Aparicio Award (2005, 2011–2013, 2015)
- 12× MLB All-Star (2004–2007, 2010–2016, 2022)
- 6× MLB Player of the Month
- 15× MLB Player of the Week
- 2× MLB Player of the Year (2012, 2013)
- 2× NL Rookie of the Month
- 2× Players Choice Award for American League Outstanding Player (2012, 2013)
- 2× Players Choice Award for Major League Player of the Year (2012, 2013)
- 7× Silver Slugger Award (2005, 2006, 2010, 2012, 2013, 2015, 2016)
- 2× The Sporting News Player of the Year Award (2012, 2013)
- 4× Tiger of the Year (2008, 2010, 2012, 2013) by the BBWAA-Detroit Chapter
- 500 home run club
- 3,000 hit club

Championships earned or shared

- 4× AL batting champion (2011–2013, 2015)
- AL Batting Triple Crown (2012)
- 2× League champion (2003, 2012)
- World Series champion (2003)

League statistical leader

- 4× Batting champion (2011–2013, 2015)
- 2× Doubles leader (2011, 2014)
- 2× Double plays grounded into leader (2012, 2016)
- Extra base hits leader (2012)
- Games played leader (2011)
- 2× Home run leader (2008, 2012)
- 2× Intentional bases on balls leader (2010, 2016)
- 4× On-base percentage leader (2010, 2011, 2013, 2015)
- 4× On-base plus slugging percentage leader (2012, 2013)
- 2× Runs batted in leader (2010, 2012)
- 2× Slugging percentage leader (2012, 2013)
- 2× Total bases leader (2008, 2012)

== Personal life ==
Cabrera is very active in the community, and in 2012, he began The Miguel Cabrera Foundation to help a variety of children's funds. He also uses his foundation to encourage young kids to play baseball and softball. In 2012 and 2013, Cabrera was nominated by his team for the Roberto Clemente Award, honoring the MLB player who best represents baseball on and off the field.

Cabrera is both a Catholic and a practitioner of Santería. He became a babalawo in the 2006 offseason. His wife is named Rosangel, and they have two daughters and one son. Rosangel filed for divorce in April 2017, but later changed her mind. Rosangel filed for divorce a second time and in June 2025, the divorce was finalized. Cabrera also has two other children, whom he fathered with an ex-mistress, a boy and a girl (who in January 2019 were six and three years old), who lived in Orlando, Florida.

In 2017, during the Venezuelan economic crisis, Cabrera criticized the country's government.

During the COVID-19 pandemic, Cabrera featured in a Spanish-language rap single with Venezuelan actor and musician Carlos Madera, known professionally as Sibilino. The song was titled "Miggy al Bate", which translates to "Miggy at Bat" in English.

=== Legal matters ===
In the early morning of October 3, 2009, police were called to the Cabrera home and took him in for questioning. Cabrera had come home at 6:00 a.m., after a night of drinking at the nearby Townsend Hotel, and got into an argument with his wife. He was seen later that day at a game at Comerica Park, with scratches on his face. Cabrera told reporters that the scratches came from his dog, and refused to discuss the matter further. It was later reported he had a blood alcohol level of .26 when tested.

On January 21, 2010, it was reported that Cabrera spent three months in an alcohol abuse treatment center to help him recover from his addiction. He said at the time he had not consumed any alcohol since he was taken into custody in October 2009, and that he would continue his treatment into spring training and the regular season.

Cabrera was arrested in Florida on suspicion of drunken driving and resisting arrest on February 16, 2011. The matter was settled on a "no contest" plea to Driving Under the Influence with the resisting charge dropped, and he was sentenced without additional jail time.

In 2018, Cabrera was in a Florida court litigating a case brought against him in August 2017 by his former mistress, Belkis Mariella Rodriguez, over a dispute regarding how much child support Cabrera should pay Rodriguez for two children they had together. She argued that given his $30 million annual salary, she was entitled to $100,000 a month. Cabrera had been paying Rodriguez $20,000 a month in child support without any court order, but cut the amount by $5,000 in the summer of 2017. In December 2018 the Orange County Circuit Court ordered Cabrera to pay $20,000 a month in child support to the ex-mistress, additional expenses, and her attorneys' fees.

== See also ==
- List of Afro-Latinos
- List of Major League Baseball players from Venezuela
- List of Major League Baseball annual doubles leaders
- List of Major League Baseball annual home run leaders
- List of Major League Baseball annual runs batted in leaders
- List of Major League Baseball batting champions
- List of Major League Baseball career batting average leaders
- List of Major League Baseball career extra base hits leaders
- List of Major League Baseball career slugging percentage leaders
- List of Major League Baseball career OPS leaders
- List of Major League Baseball career doubles leaders
- List of Major League Baseball career runs scored leaders
- List of Major League Baseball career runs batted in leaders
- List of Major League Baseball career hits leaders
- List of Major League Baseball career total bases leaders
- List of Major League Baseball career home run leaders
- List of Major League Baseball career strikeouts by batters leaders
- List of Miami Marlins team records
- Tigres de Aragua

Awards and achievements
Preceded by Andrew McCutchen	MLB: The Show Cover athlete (American release); MLB 14: The Show	Succeeded by Yasiel Puig
Preceded by Gary Sánchez	American League; Player of the Month; September 2016	Succeeded by Mike Trout
