= List of Miami Marlins minor league affiliates =

Current Miami Marlins domestic minor league affiliate locations

The Miami Marlins farm system consists of seven Minor League Baseball affiliates across the United States and in the Dominican Republic. Four teams are owned by the major league club, while three—the Pensacola Blue Wahoos, Beloit Sky Carp, and Jupiter Hammerheads—are independently owned.

The Marlins have been affiliated with the Single-A Jupiter Hammerheads of the Florida State League since 2002, making it the longest-running active affiliation in the organization among teams not owned by the Marlins. It is also the longest affiliation in the team's history. Their newest affiliates are the Double-A Pensacola Blue Wahoos of the Southern League and the High-A Beloit Sky Carp of the Midwest League, which became Marlins affiliates in 2021.

Geographically, Miami's closest domestic affiliates are the Jupiter Hammerheads and Rookie Florida Complex League Marlins, which share a ballpark approximately 77 miles (124 km) away. Miami's furthest domestic affiliate is the Beloit Sky Carp some 1,259 miles (2,026 km) away.

== Current affiliates ==
The Miami Marlins farm system consists of seven minor league affiliates.

Class	Team	League	Location	Ballpark	Affiliated
Triple-A	Jacksonville Jumbo Shrimp	International League	Jacksonville, Florida	VyStar Ballpark	2009
Double-A	Pensacola Blue Wahoos	Southern League	Pensacola, Florida	Blue Wahoos Stadium	2021
High-A	Beloit Sky Carp	Midwest League	Beloit, Wisconsin	ABC Supply Stadium	2021
Single-A	Jupiter Hammerheads	Florida State League	Jupiter, Florida	Roger Dean Chevrolet Stadium	2002
Rookie	FCL Marlins	Florida Complex League	Jupiter, Florida	Roger Dean Chevrolet Stadium	1992
Rookie	DSL Marlins	Dominican Summer League	Boca Chica, Santo Domingo	Academia de Prospecto Complex	1993
Rookie	DSL Miami	Dominican Summer League	Boca Chica, Santo Domingo	Academia de Prospecto Complex	2022

== Past affiliates ==
=== Key ===
Season	Each year is linked to an article about that particular Marlins season.

=== 1990–2020 ===
Minor League Baseball operated with six classes (Triple-A, Double-A, Class A-Advanced, Class A, Class A Short Season, and Rookie) from 1990 to 2020. The Rookie level consisted of domestic and foreign circuits.

Season	Triple-A	Double-A	Class A-Advanced	Class A	Class A Short Season	Rookie	Foreign Rookie	Ref.
1992	—	—	—	—	Erie Sailors	GCL Marlins	—	
1993	Edmonton Trappers	—	High Desert Mavericks	Kane County Cougars	Elmira Pioneers	GCL Marlins	DSL Marlins	
1994	Edmonton Trappers	Portland Sea Dogs	Brevard County Manatees	Kane County Cougars	Elmira Pioneers	GCL Marlins	DSL Marlins	
1995	Charlotte Knights	Portland Sea Dogs	Brevard County Manatees	Kane County Cougars	Elmira Pioneers	GCL Marlins	DSL Marlins	
1996	Charlotte Knights	Portland Sea Dogs	Brevard County Manatees	Kane County Cougars	Utica Blue Sox	GCL Marlins	DSL Marlins	
1997	Charlotte Knights	Portland Sea Dogs	Brevard County Manatees	Kane County Cougars	Utica Blue Sox	GCL Marlins	DSL Marlins	
1998	Charlotte Knights	Portland Sea Dogs	Brevard County Manatees	Kane County Cougars	Utica Blue Sox	GCL Marlins	DSL Marlins	
1999	Calgary Cannons	Portland Sea Dogs	Brevard County Manatees	Kane County Cougars	Utica Blue Sox	GCL Marlins	DSL Marlins	
2000	Calgary Cannons	Portland Sea Dogs	Brevard County Manatees	Kane County Cougars	Utica Blue Sox	GCL Marlins	DSL Marlins	
2001	Calgary Cannons	Portland Sea Dogs	Brevard County Manatees	Kane County Cougars	Utica Blue Sox	GCL Marlins	DSL Marlins	
2002	Calgary Cannons	Portland Sea Dogs	Jupiter Hammerheads	Kane County Cougars	Jamestown Jammers	GCL Marlins	DSL Marlins; VSL San Joaquin (Note: In 2002, the Marlins operated a Venezuelan Summer League team as a co-op with the Los Angeles Dodgers.)	
2003	Albuquerque Isotopes	Carolina Mudcats	Jupiter Hammerheads	Greensboro Bats	Jamestown Jammers	GCL Marlins	DSL Marlins; VSL Cocorote (Note: In 2003, the Marlins operated a Venezuelan Summer League team as a co-op with the Toronto Blue Jays.)	
2004	Albuquerque Isotopes	Carolina Mudcats	Jupiter Hammerheads	Greensboro Bats	Jamestown Jammers	GCL Marlins	DSL Marlins; VSL Universidad de Carabobo (Note: In 2003, the Marlins operated a Venezuelan Summer League team as a co-op with the San Diego Padres.)	
2005	Albuquerque Isotopes	Carolina Mudcats	Jupiter Hammerheads	Greensboro Grasshoppers	Jamestown Jammers	GCL Marlins	DSL Marlins; VSL Marlins/Nationals	
2006	Albuquerque Isotopes	Carolina Mudcats	Jupiter Hammerheads	Greensboro Grasshoppers	Jamestown Jammers	GCL Marlins	DSL Marlins; VSL Marlins/Tigers	
2007	Albuquerque Isotopes	Carolina Mudcats	Jupiter Hammerheads	Greensboro Grasshoppers	Jamestown Jammers	GCL Marlins	DSL Marlins	
2008	Albuquerque Isotopes	Carolina Mudcats	Jupiter Hammerheads	Greensboro Grasshoppers	Jamestown Jammers	GCL Marlins	DSL Marlins	
2009	New Orleans Zephyrs	Jacksonville Suns	Jupiter Hammerheads	Greensboro Grasshoppers	Jamestown Jammers	GCL Marlins	DSL Marlins	
2010	New Orleans Zephyrs	Jacksonville Suns	Jupiter Hammerheads	Greensboro Grasshoppers	Jamestown Jammers	GCL Marlins	DSL Marlins	
2011	New Orleans Zephyrs	Jacksonville Suns	Jupiter Hammerheads	Greensboro Grasshoppers	Jamestown Jammers	GCL Marlins	DSL Marlins	
2012	New Orleans Zephyrs	Jacksonville Suns	Jupiter Hammerheads	Greensboro Grasshoppers	Jamestown Jammers	GCL Marlins	DSL Marlins	
2013	New Orleans Zephyrs	Jacksonville Suns	Jupiter Hammerheads	Greensboro Grasshoppers	Batavia Muckdogs	GCL Marlins	DSL Marlins	
2014	New Orleans Zephyrs	Jacksonville Suns	Jupiter Hammerheads	Greensboro Grasshoppers	Batavia Muckdogs	GCL Marlins	DSL Marlins	
2015	New Orleans Zephyrs	Jacksonville Suns	Jupiter Hammerheads	Greensboro Grasshoppers	Batavia Muckdogs	GCL Marlins	DSL Marlins	
2016	New Orleans Zephyrs	Jacksonville Suns	Jupiter Hammerheads	Greensboro Grasshoppers	Batavia Muckdogs	GCL Marlins	DSL Marlins	
2017	New Orleans Baby Cakes	Jacksonville Jumbo Shrimp	Jupiter Hammerheads	Greensboro Grasshoppers	Batavia Muckdogs	GCL Marlins	DSL Marlins	
2018	New Orleans Baby Cakes	Jacksonville Jumbo Shrimp	Jupiter Hammerheads	Greensboro Grasshoppers	Batavia Muckdogs	GCL Marlins	DSL Marlins	
2019	New Orleans Baby Cakes	Jacksonville Jumbo Shrimp	Jupiter Hammerheads	Clinton LumberKings	Batavia Muckdogs	GCL Marlins	DSL Marlins	
2020 (Note: The 2020 Minor League Baseball season was cancelled due to the COVID-19 pandemic.)	Wichita Wind Surge	Jacksonville Jumbo Shrimp	Jupiter Hammerheads	Clinton LumberKings	Batavia Muckdogs	GCL Marlins	DSL Marlins	

=== 2021–present ===
The current structure of Minor League Baseball is the result of an overall contraction of the system beginning with the 2021 season. Class A was reduced to two levels: High-A and Low-A. Low-A was reclassified as Single-A in 2022.

Season	Triple-A	Double-A	High-A	Single-A	Rookie	Foreign Rookie	Ref.
2021	Jacksonville Jumbo Shrimp	Pensacola Blue Wahoos	Beloit Snappers	Jupiter Hammerheads	FCL Marlins	DSL Marlins	
2022	Jacksonville Jumbo Shrimp	Pensacola Blue Wahoos	Beloit Sky Carp	Jupiter Hammerheads	FCL Marlins	DSL Marlins; DSL Miami	
2023	Jacksonville Jumbo Shrimp	Pensacola Blue Wahoos	Beloit Sky Carp	Jupiter Hammerheads	FCL Marlins	DSL Marlins; DSL Miami	
2024	Jacksonville Jumbo Shrimp	Pensacola Blue Wahoos	Beloit Sky Carp	Jupiter Hammerheads	FCL Marlins	DSL Marlins; DSL Miami	
2025	Jacksonville Jumbo Shrimp	Pensacola Blue Wahoos	Beloit Sky Carp	Jupiter Hammerheads	FCL Marlins	DSL Marlins; DSL Miami	
2026	Jacksonville Jumbo Shrimp	Pensacola Blue Wahoos	Beloit Sky Carp	Jupiter Hammerheads	FCL Marlins	DSL Marlins; DSL Miami	
