= Dominican Summer League Marlins =

- Boca Chica

Minor league affiliations
- Class: Rookie
- League: Dominican Summer League
- Division: Boca Chica North

Major league affiliations
- Team: Miami Marlins

Minor league titles
- League titles (0): None

Team data
- Name: Marlins
- Ballpark: Academia de Prospecto Complex
- Owner(s)/ Operator(s): Miami Marlins
- Manager: Oscar Escobar; Carlos Mota

The Dominican Summer Marlins are a minor league baseball team in the Dominican Summer League. The team plays in the Boca Chica North division and is affiliated with the Miami Marlins.

== Roster ==
Dominican Summer League Miami roster
Players		Coaches/Other
Pitchers: 48 Derek Arellan; 13 Alejandro De La Cruz; -- Fernando De La Rosa; -- Kevin Defrank; 37 Kifraidy Encarnacion; -- Angel Garcia; 25 Manuel Genao; -- Adriano Marrero; 43 Ian Medina; 10 Bayant Melo; -- Pedro Montero; 2 Franklyn Moreta; 34 Eiver Mosquera; 18 Raisei Nakamura; 36 Carlos Ochoa; 37 Albert Ortiz; 7 Jose Paulino; -- Adrian Pena; 45 Albert Polanco; -- Isaac Prince; 35 Maikel Rodriguez; 17 Cristian Rueda; 46 Yohanfer Santana; 46 Jonfreider Torrealba; 24 Jonas Uzcategui	Catchers: 14 Alexander Requena; 3 Almen Tolentino; Infielders: -- Anthony Abreu; 5 Gregori Arias; 12 Lisandro Bonifacio; 27 Breyias Dean; 8 Jayden Felicia; -- Steven Herrera; 15 Yordani Martinez; -- Sandy Presbot; Outfielders: 4 Jose Castro; -- Osvaldo Heredia; 29 Janero Miller	Manager: -- Oscar Escobar; Coaches: -- Arquimedes Cumana (coach); -- Ramon Espinosa (defensive); -- Yohan Pino (pitching); -- Rigoberto Silverio (hitting); 7-day injured list * On Miami Marlins 40-man roster ~ Development list # Rehab assignment ∞ Reserve list ‡ Restricted list § Suspended list † Temporarily inactive list Roster updated February 6, 2025; Transactions → More rosters: MiLB • Dominican Summer League → Miami Marlins minor league players

Dominican Summer League Marlins roster
Players		Coaches/Other
Pitchers: 48 Oswaldo Aponte; -- Edelson Canelon; -- Keyner Cedeno; 26 Melvin Cuevas; 33 Luis De La Cruz; 44 Eiver Espinoza; 27 Luis Espinoza; 14 Jeckferxon Hernandez; 32 Estarlin Francisco; -- Diego Godoy; 45 Eric Gutierrez; 22 Wilfredo Henriquez; 12 Abraham Hernandez; 41 Elvin Jimenez; -- Santiago Linares; 24 Gerinton Mendez; -- Elier Morillo; 29 Jose Paulino; -- Luis Porfirio; 21 Bryan Reyes; 29 Luifer Romero; 28 Victor Rodriguez; 46 Angel Rosario; 15 Jonathan Rosario; 40 Braulio Salas; 30 Elian Serrata; -- Alfonso Suriel; 47 Roosevelt Trinidad; 31 Mado Villegas	Catchers: 23 Jesus Abreu; 10 Jeremy Almonte; 17 Adrian Bello; -- Diego Martinez; -- Moises Morales; 7 Kevin Robledo; Infielders: -- Juan Alva; -- Luis Arana; 6 Rafael Castillo; 4 Derek Cueto; 36 Diwarys Encarnacion; 2 Adrian Ibarra; -- Johan Machado; 1 Jose Rivera; -- Andrew Salas; 20 Joseph Tailor; Outfielders: 8 Luis Cova; 5 Jancory De La Cruz; 3 Deivis Mosquera; -- Jesus Perez; 11 Robert Perez	Manager: -- Carlos Mota; Coaches: -- Miguel Fermin (catching); -- César Jiménez (pitching); -- Emilio Linares (hitting); 7-day injured list * On Miami Marlins 40-man roster ~ Development list # Rehab assignment ∞ Reserve list ‡ Restricted list § Suspended list † Temporarily inactive list Roster updated February 28, 2025; Transactions → More rosters: MiLB • Dominican Summer League → Miami Marlins minor league players
